= 2014 Turkish presidential election =

Election of Recep Tayyip Erdoğan

- 10 August 2014
- Turnout: 74.13%
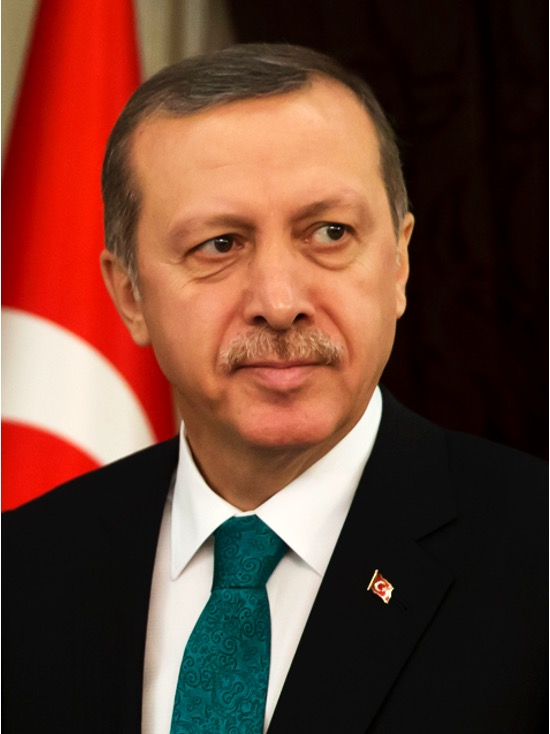

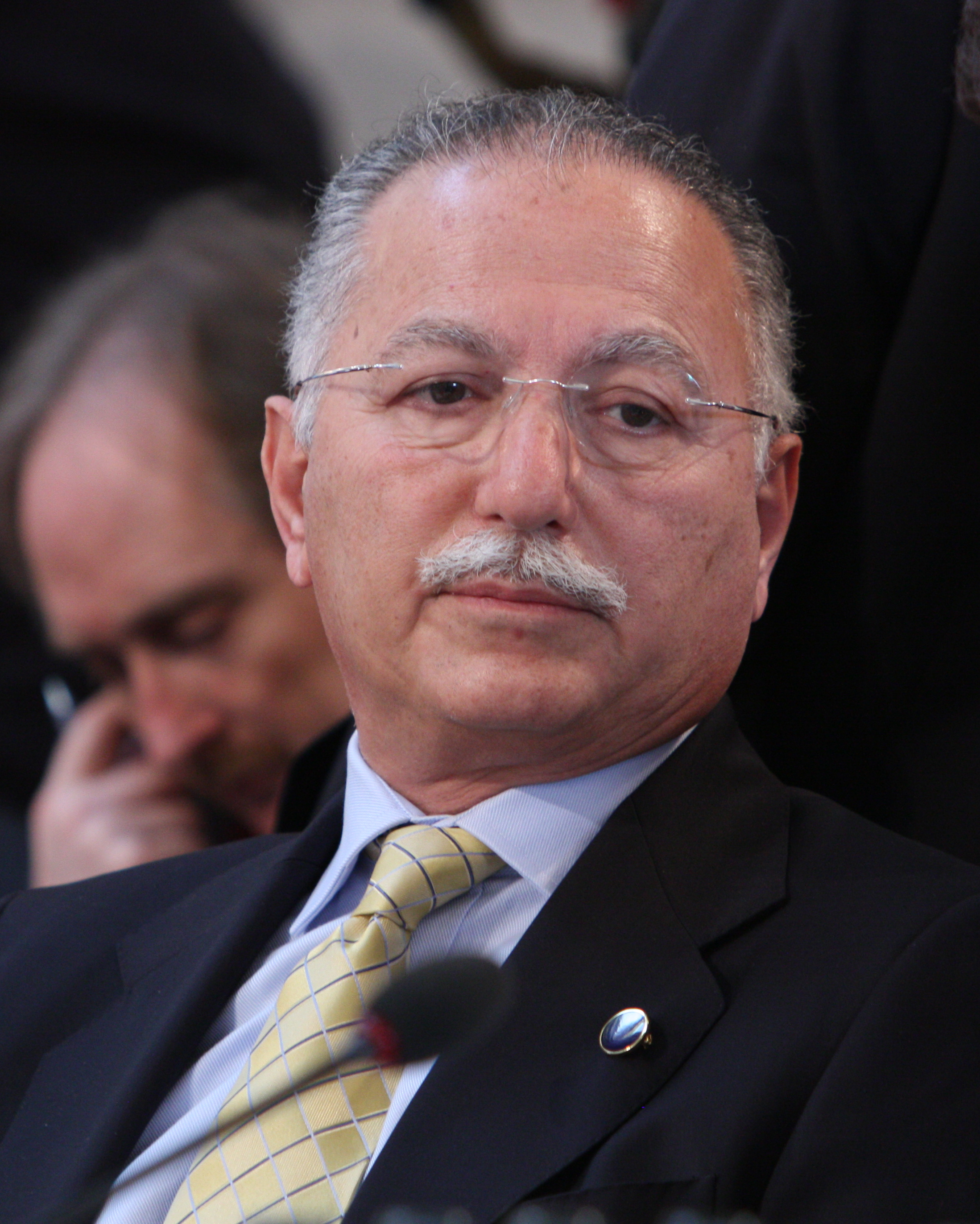

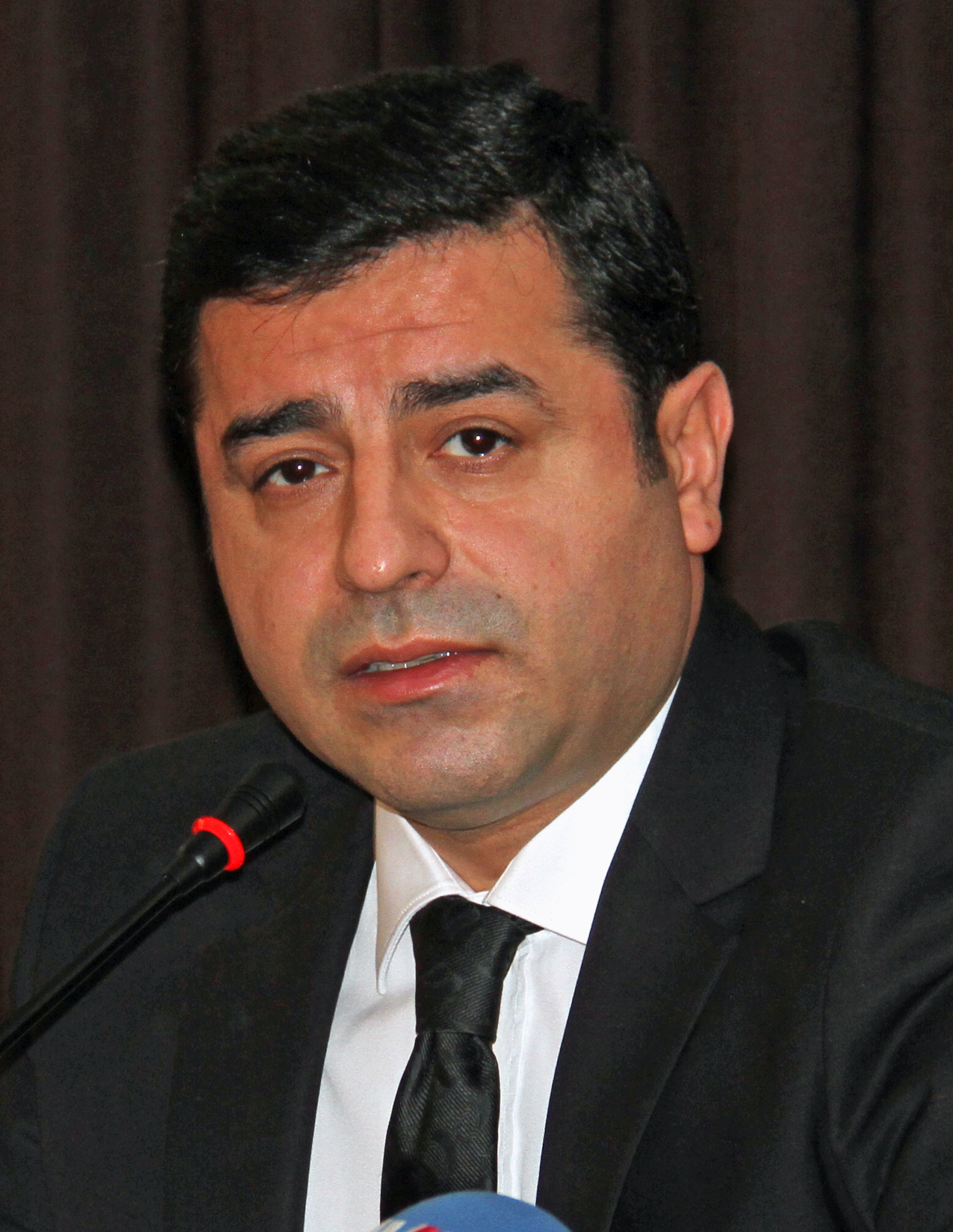
Candidate	Recep Tayyip Erdoğan	Ekmeleddin İhsanoğlu	Selahattin Demirtaş
Party	AK Party	Cross-party (Note: Initially nominated by the Republican People's Party (CHP). After being endorsed by the Nationalist Movement Party (MHP), further receiving the support of 11 other opposition parties.)	HDP
Popular vote	21,000,143	15,587,720	3,958,048
Percentage	51.79%	38.44%	9.76%
- Results by province
President before election
Abdullah Gül
AK Party
Elected President
Recep Tayyip Erdoğan
AK Party

Presidential elections were held in Turkey on 10 August 2014 in order to elect the 12th President. Prime Minister Recep Tayyip Erdoğan was elected outright with an absolute majority of the vote in the first round, making a scheduled run-off for 24 August unnecessary.

The election took place under reforms resulting from the 2007 constitutional referendum, which introduced a direct national vote, rather than election by members of the parliament. Over 55 million people were eligible to vote, both within Turkey and abroad.

Recep Tayyip Erdoğan, leader of the AK Party and prime minister since 2003 after winning the 2002 Turkish general election, won with 51.79% of the vote. Former Organisation of Islamic Cooperation General Secretary Ekmeleddin İhsanoğlu, who ran as the joint candidate of 13 opposition parties including the Republican People's Party (CHP) and Nationalist Movement Party (MHP), came second with 38.44%. The co-leader of the Peoples' Democratic Party (HDP) Selahattin Demirtaş, who received the backing of 8 left-wing parties, came third with 9.76%.

Erdoğan took over as president from Abdullah Gül on 28 August, while Ahmet Davutoğlu, who was elected leader of the AK Party, succeeded Erdoğan as prime minister on the same date. It has been speculated that Erdoğan will continue to pursue his political agenda as president while Davutoğlu takes a docile approach as prime minister, breaking away from the ceremonial and neutral functions of the presidency and potentially pursuing constitutional changes to turn Turkey into a presidential or semi-presidential system.

The election was criticised by both the political opposition and international observers for alleged media bias in favour of Recep Tayyip Erdoğan, corruption allegations, the inaccuracy of opinion polls and the misuse of official public resources during Erdoğan's campaign. While praising the authorities for safeguarding the right to assembly as well as the peaceful electoral conduct, the Organization for Security and Co-operation in Europe (OSCE) voiced concerns over the unequal distribution of campaign resources and media intimidation. The historic 12-year low turnout of 74.13%, attributed to the fact that the election was held in summer while many citizens were on holiday, was seen by many politicians such as MHP leader Devlet Bahçeli as a significant factor in affecting the outcome. The election loss for the opposition CHP resulted in its leader Kemal Kılıçdaroğlu taking the decision to hold a party convention with a leadership election in response to growing dissatisfaction against his electoral performance.

== Background ==
The Law on Presidential Elections accepted and put into effect on 20 January 2012 decided that presidential elections will be held in 2014 instead of 2012; within 60 days before the end of the seven-year term of incumbent president of Turkey Abdullah Gül, who will be the last indirectly elected President of Turkey. As Gül took office on 28 August 2007, the first possible day could be 29 June, but a date between 10 and 17 August is considered more reasonable.

It was decided in the same law that former presidents Kenan Evren, Süleyman Demirel, Ahmet Necdet Sezer and incumbent Abdullah Gül could not be nominated for a second term, but this was ruled unconstitutional by the Constitutional Court of Turkey, allowing them to run for a second term. Also, the Prime Minister of Turkey could be nominated for the presidency without having to resign from his post.

The presidential-election campaigns were declared to be held in an "American manner", where candidates could accept personal donations for their campaigns; however, one person could not donate more than 8,259 TL (approximately US$4,500) to a campaign.

== Official candidates ==
Three candidates were nominated to participate in the election. A more detailed list of parties that endorsed them can be found in the "List of parties by presidential candidates" section.

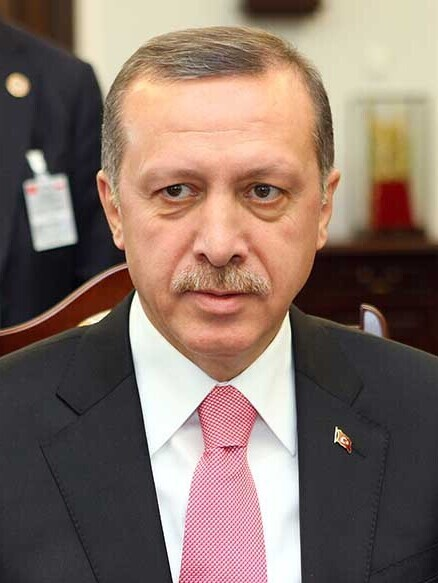
Recep Tayyip Erdoğan, serving leader of the Justice and Development Party (AK Party) since 2001 and Prime Minister of Turkey since 2003, received 311 nominations.

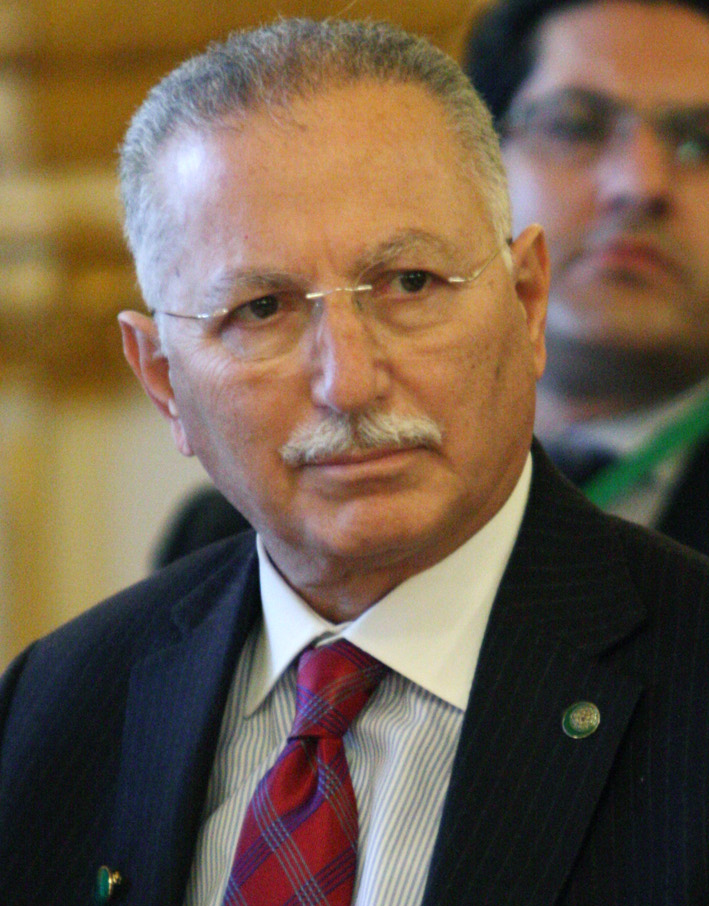
Ekmeleddin İhsanoğlu, former secretary general of the Organisation of Islamic Co-operation (OIC) from 2004 to 2014 and potential AKP presidential candidate in 2007, received 163 nominations.
supporting parties
- Republican People's Party
  Nationalist Movement Party
  Democrat Party
  Democratic Left Party
  Independent Turkey Party
  Liberal Democratic Party
  Great Union Party
  Revolutionary People's Party
  Socialist Workers' Party
  True Path Party
  Rights and Justice Party
  Women's Party
  Social Reconciliation Reform and Development Party
  Great Anatolian Development Movement

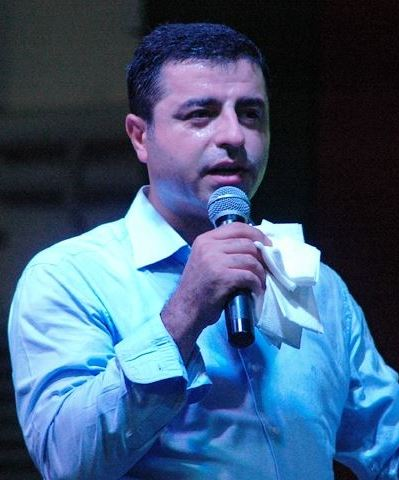
Selahattin Demirtaş, co-leader of the Peoples' Democratic Party (HDP), received 30 nominations.

=== Parliamentary nomination process ===
Distribution of seats by party in the Grand National Assembly

To run for election, a candidate needs to be nominated by at least 20 Members of Parliament in the Grand National Assembly, which constitutes to 3.73% of all sitting members. The parties represented in parliament are the AK Party, CHP, MHP, HDP, DBP and 14 independents, meaning that smaller parties such as the Felicity Party (SP) and the Great Union Party (BBP) could not nominate their own candidates due to the lack of parliamentary representation. Three candidates obtained sufficient endorsements from parliament in order to register with the Supreme Electoral Council. The Electoral Council forbids any potential candidate from nominating themselves, since this would give unfair advantage to prospective candidates who were sitting Members of Parliament. The AK Party began collecting signatures for an unnamed candidate from all 311 eligible MPs out of their 312-seat total, with Recep Tayyip Erdoğan being the only MP to not sign. Due to the debate on whether the CHP's candidate Ekmeleddin İhsanoğlu adhered to secular and Kemalist principles, 21 CHP MPs boycotted the nomination process. Six CHP MPs protested their leader's choice of candidate by attempting to nominate Emine Ülker Tarhan instead, though she herself stated that she would not stand as a candidate. Out of the 14 independent MPs, three supported İhsanoğlu while two supported Demirtaş, with the remaining 9 boycotting the process altogether. Only 536 seats out of the 550 are occupied, with many vacant MPs having resigned or serving prison sentences due to their roles in the PKK, or the Sledgehammer and Ergenekon coup trials.

Candidate	Endorsing parties^{a}	Nomination date	Potential signatures^{b}	Actual signatures	% of potential	% of all MPs	Result
Recep Tayyip Erdoğan	AK Party	1 July 2014	312	311	99.68	58.02	Nominated
Ekmeleddin İhsanoğlu	CHP, MHP + 3 independents	30 June 2014	182	163	89.56	30.41	Nominated
Selahattin Demirtaş	HDP, DBP^{c} + 2 independents	3 July 2014	28	30	100.00	5.60	Nominated
Emine Ülker Tarhan^{d}	CHP	1 July 2014	130	6	4.62	1.12	Eliminated
Masum Türker	DSP	2 May 2014	0	0	0.00	0.00	Eliminated
Total			536^{f}	510	-	92.73	3 candidates

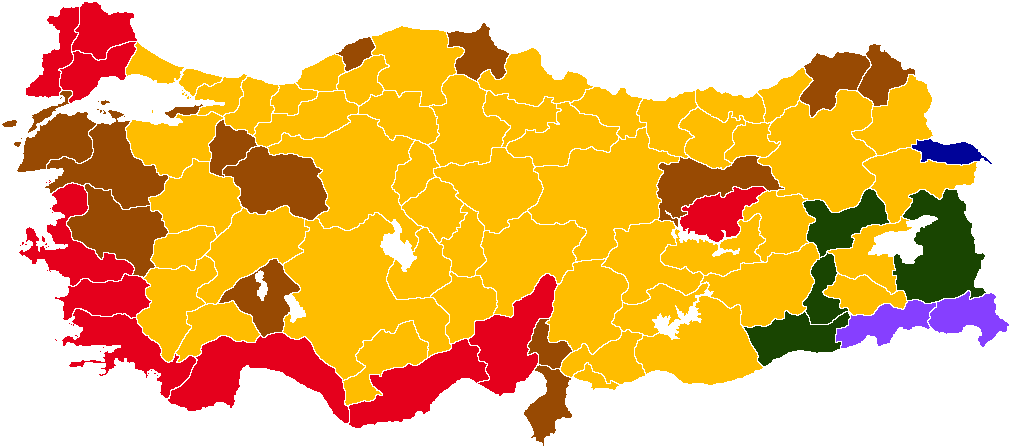
A map showing the distribution of MPs in the 81 provinces in terms of which candidate they support denotes provinces in which most MPs support Erdoğan denotes provinces in which most MPs support İhsanoğlu denotes provinces in which most MPs support Demirtaş an equal number of MPs supporting Erdoğan and İhsanoğlu an equal number of MPs supporting Erdoğan and Demirtaş an equal number of MPs supporting Demirtaş and İhsanoğlu

^{a} Lists parties with parliamentary representation only
^{b} Number of MPs from the parties that support these candidates, discounting independents
^{c} Was named the Peace and Democracy Party (BDP), changed its name after the election
^{d} Emine Ülker Tarhan publicly stated that she did not want to stand as a candidate, but received nominations from CHP MPs opposed to İhsanoğlu

21 Members of Parliament from the CHP, including former leader Deniz Baykal as well as potential presidential candidate Emine Ülker Tarhan, boycotted the nomination process.

=== Candidate selection ===
==== Justice and Development Party (AK Party) ====
Turkish and international media speculated that Recep Tayyip Erdoğan would almost certainly be the AKP's candidate for the presidency. This was proven correct on 1 July when Erdoğan's candidacy was announced. Abdullah Gül, the outgoing president of Turkey elected in 2007 caused media speculation regarding a potential candidacy in January 2014. He announced that he would not stand on 29 June 2014. A full list of possible AK Party candidates which at one point showed intentions of running for election is as follows.

- Recep Tayyip Erdoğan, leader of the AKP (2001–2014) and Prime Minister of Turkey (2003–2014).
- Abdullah Gül, Prime Minister of Turkey (2002–2003), President of Turkey (2007–2014).
- Bülent Arınç, Deputy Prime Minister of Turkey (2009–2015) and Speaker of Parliament (2002–2007), endorsed Recep Tayyip Erdoğan.
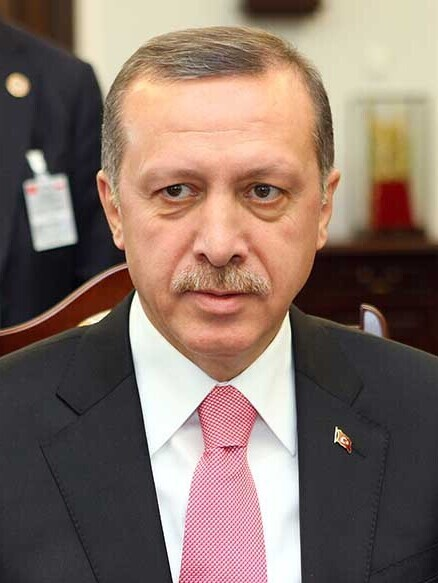
Recep Tayyip Erdoğan, leader of the AKP (2001–2014) and Prime Minister of Turkey (2003–2014).

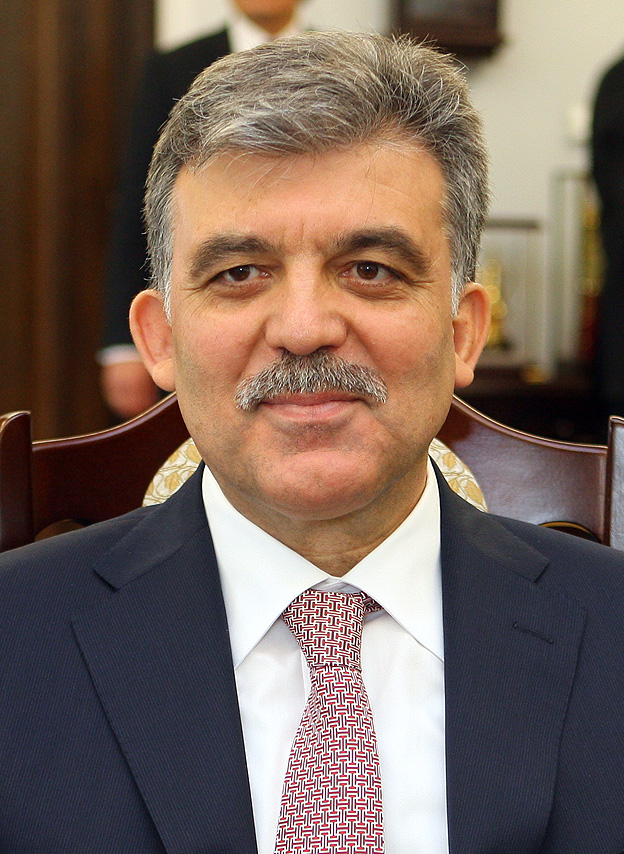
Abdullah Gül, Prime Minister of Turkey (2002–2003), President of Turkey (2007–2014).

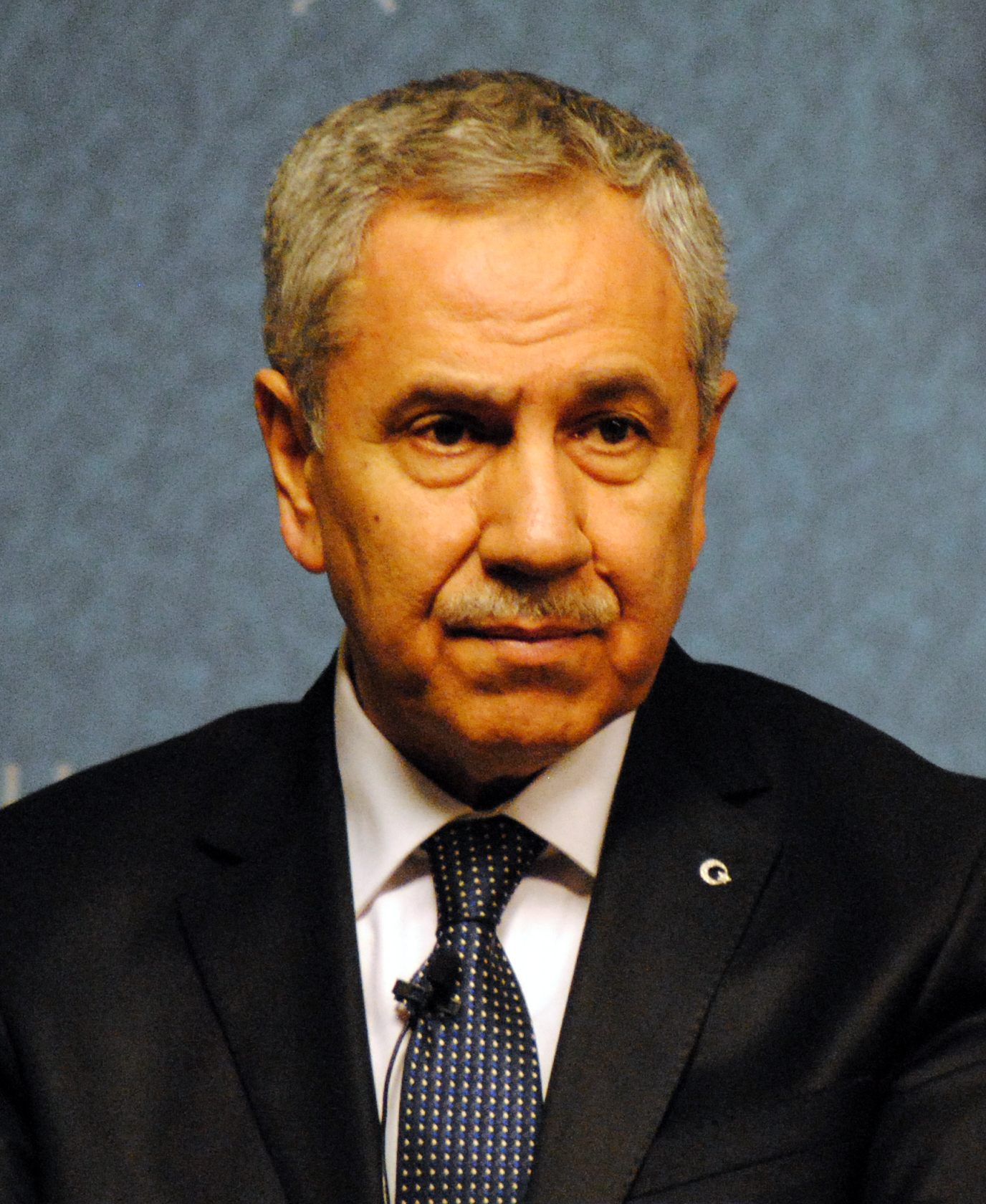
Bülent Arınç, Deputy Prime Minister of Turkey (2009–2015) and Speaker of Parliament (2002–2007).

==== Republican People's Party (CHP) ====
The two main opposition parties, the Republican People's Party (CHP) and the Nationalist Movement Party (MHP) had both expressed interest in fielding a joint candidate after the March 2014 local elections. In an unofficial vote of CHP MPs, Eskişehir mayor Yılmaz Büyükerşen was seen as a potential forerunner. A list of potential candidates which had expressed interest in running, or had been recommended as a candidate of the CHP or its parliamentary sister party DSP (Democratic Left Party) is as follows.

- Ekmeleddin İhsanoğlu, former secretary general of the Organisation of Islamic Co-operation, recommended by Kemal Derviş
- Kemal Kılıçdaroğlu, leader of the CHP since 2010, challenged by AK Party MP Egemen Bağış
- Yılmaz Büyükerşen, CHP mayor of Eskişehir, first recommended by Democrat Party president Hüsamettin Cindoruk
- Kamer Genç, CHP Member of Parliament for Tunceli
- Kemal Derviş, former economy minister and United Nations Development Program Administrator
- İlker Başbuğ, former Chief of the General Staff of Turkey, released from prison in March 2014
- Hikmet Çetin, former minister of foreign affairs, parliamentary speaker and CHP leader, recommended by Mustafa Sarıgül
- Ümit Nazlı Boyner, former president of Turkish Industry and Business Association (TÜSİAD)
- Mehmet Bekaroğlu, human rights activist, academic and former Welfare Party MP, recommended by CHP MP Muharrem İnce
- Mehmet Haberal, CHP Zonguldak MP, surgeon and founder of Başkent University
- Orhan Pamuk, novelist, screenwriter, academic and recipient of the 2006 Nobel Prize in Literature
- Emine Ülker Tarhan, CHP Member of Parliament for Ankara, supported against Ekmeleddin İhsanoğlu by Workers' Party, Republican Women's Association and Youth Union of Turkey
- Adnan Menderes – grandson of former prime minister Adnan Menderes, professor at Dokuz Eylül University
- Deniz Baykal – former leader of the CHP
- Sami Selçuk – former First President of Court of Cassation
- Mansur Yavaş – CHP mayoral candidate for Ankara in the 2014 local elections
- Metin Feyzioğlu – President of the Turkish Bars Association
- Haşim Kılıç – President of the Constitutional Court
- Meral Akşener – Vice speaker of the Grand National Assembly and former Interior Minister. MHP MP from Istanbul and supported by the CHP
- Yaşar Kemal – writer of Kurdish origin who has long been a candidate for the Nobel Prize in literature
- Aysel Çelikel – former minister of justice in 2002
- İlhan Kesici – former Motherland Party mayoral candidate for Istanbul and a CHP MP
- Yekta Güngör Özden – former president of the Constitutional Court between 1991 and 1998
- İlber Ortaylı, Turkish historian
- Rıza Türmen, former judge of the European Court of Human Rights
- Abdüllatif Şener, former Deputy Prime Minister of Turkey and founder of the Turkey Party
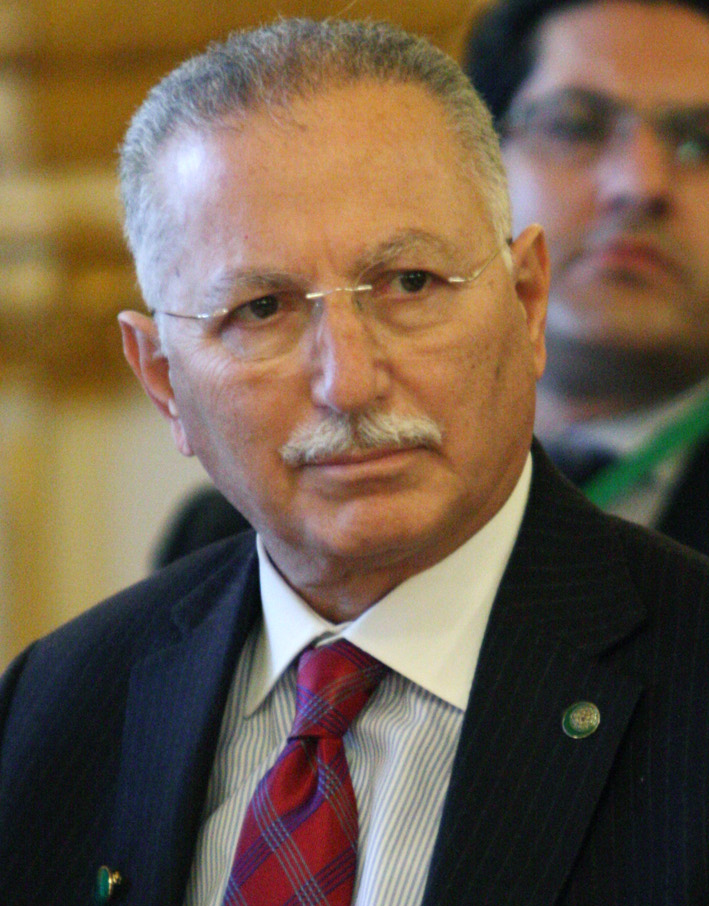
Ekmeleddin İhsanoğlu, former secretary general of the Organisation of Islamic Co-operation, recommended by Kemal Derviş.

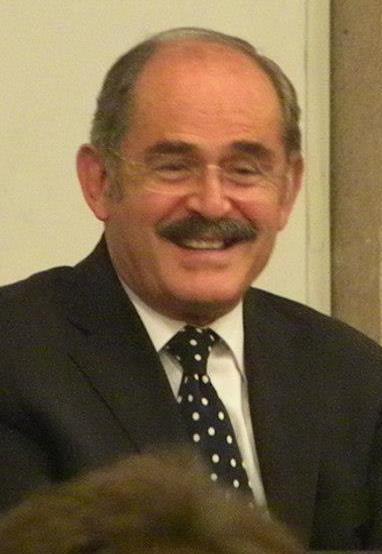
Yılmaz Büyükerşen, CHP mayor of Eskişehir.

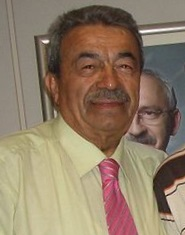
Kamer Genç, CHP Member of Parliament for Tunceli.

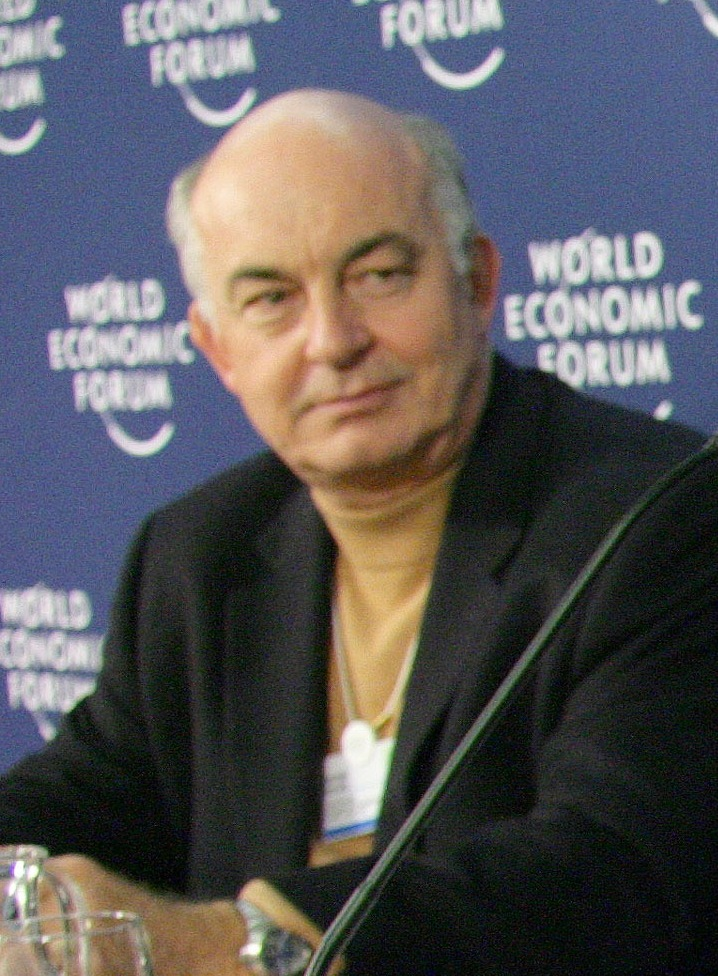
Kemal Derviş, former economy minister and United Nations Development Program Administrator.

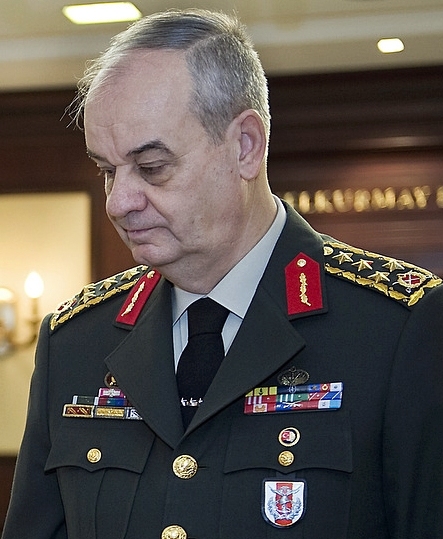
İlker Başbuğ, former Chief of the General Staff of Turkey, released from prison in March 2014.

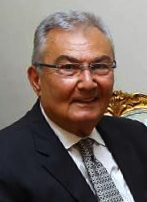
Deniz Bakyal, former leader of the CHP, Member of Parliament for Antalya

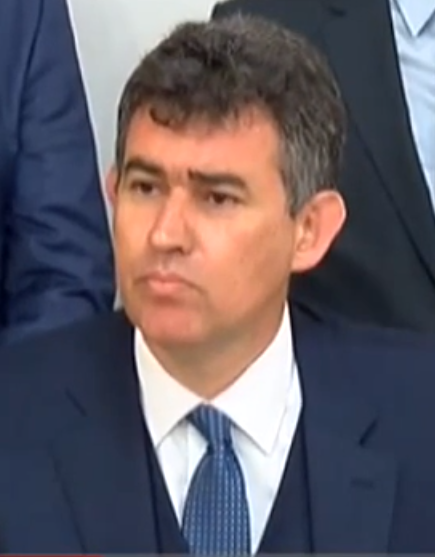
Metin Feyzioğlu, 8th and current President of the Turkish Bars Association

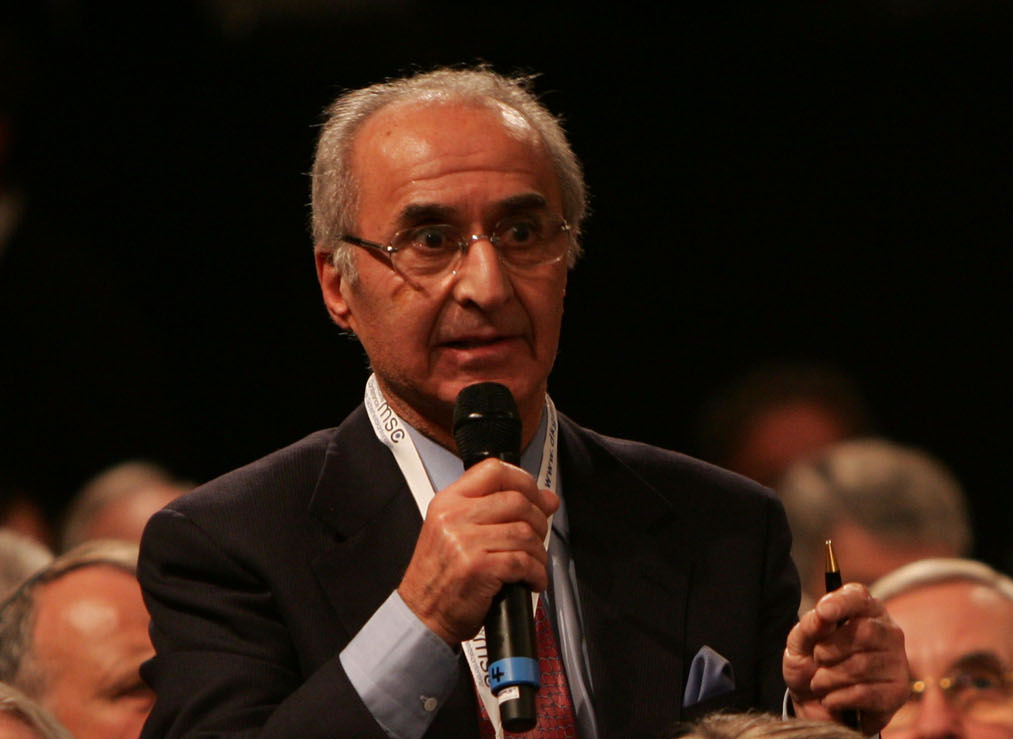
Hikmet Çetin, former minister of foreign affairs, parliamentary speaker and CHP leader, recommended by Mustafa Sarıgül.

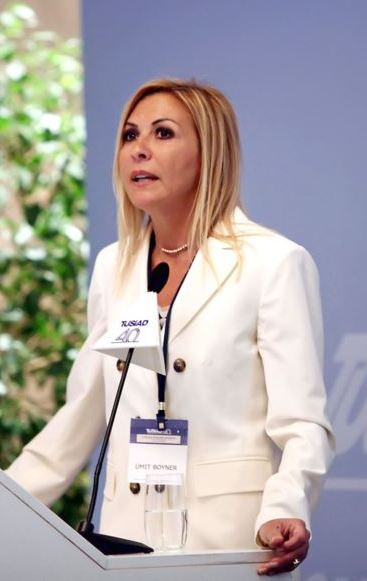
Ümit Nazlı Boyner, former president of Turkish Industry and Business Association (TÜSİAD).

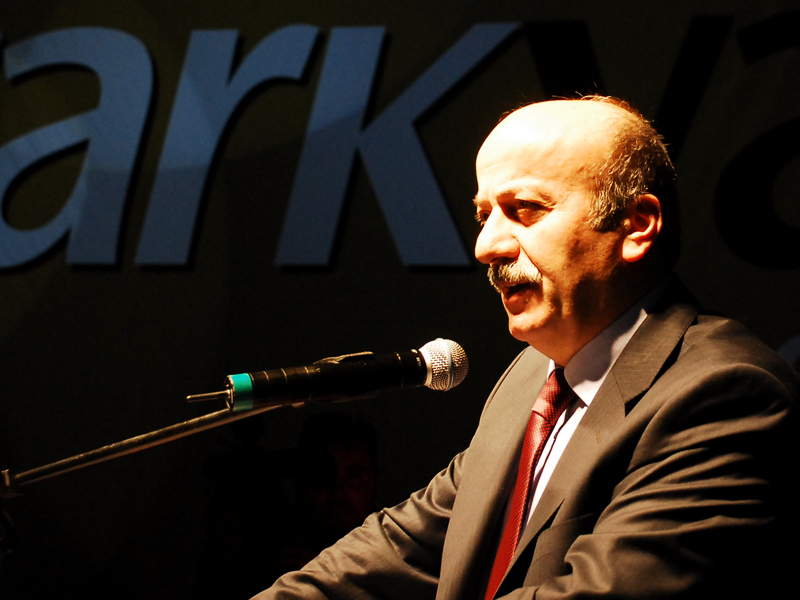
Mehmet Bekaroğlu, human rights activist, academic and former Welfare Party MP, recommended by CHP MP Muharrem İnce.

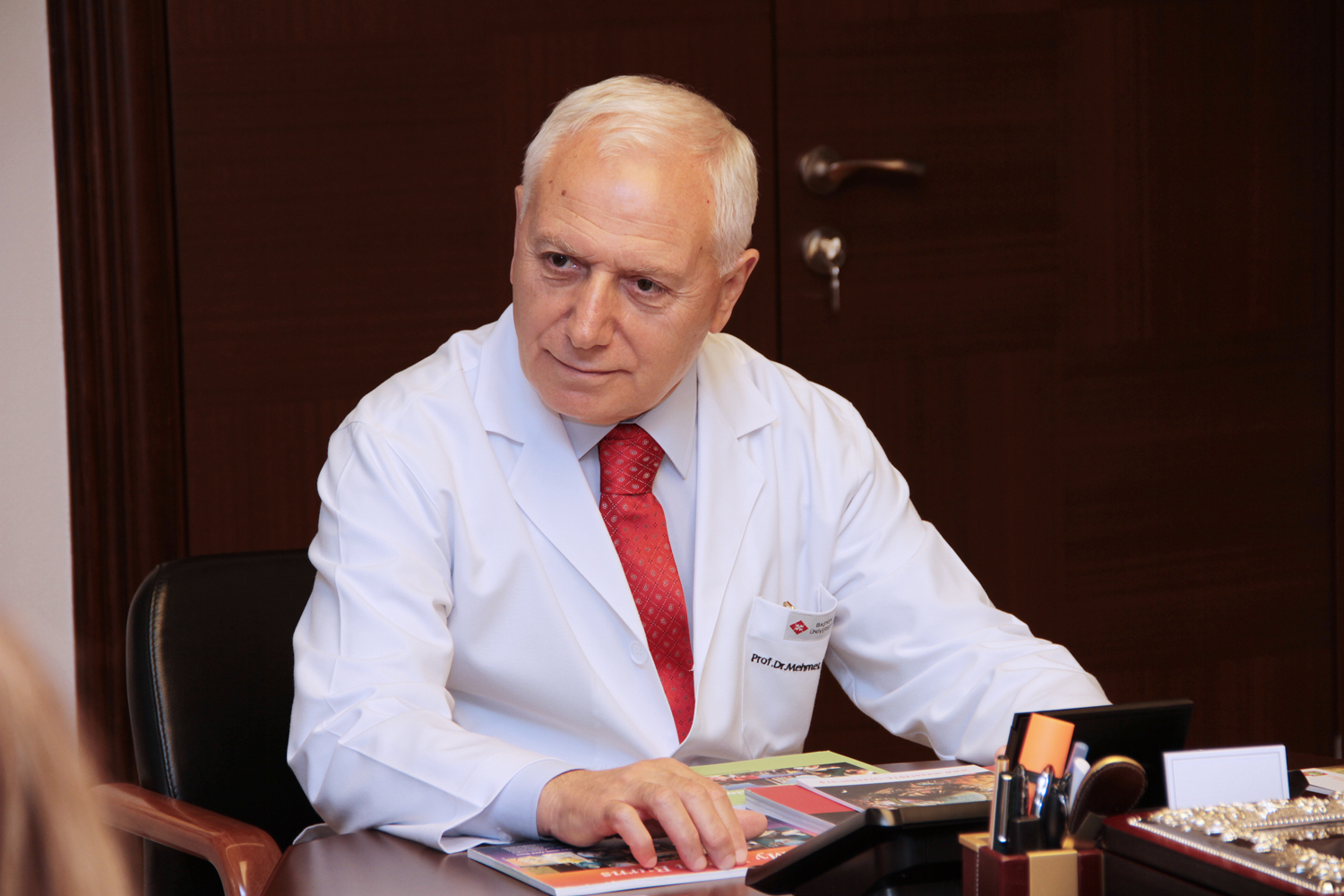
Mehmet Haberal, CHP Zonguldak MP, surgeon and founder of Başkent University.

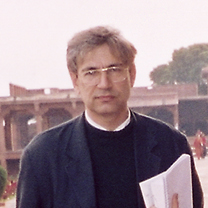
Orhan Pamuk, novelist, screenwriter, academic and recipient of the 2006 Nobel Prize in Literature.

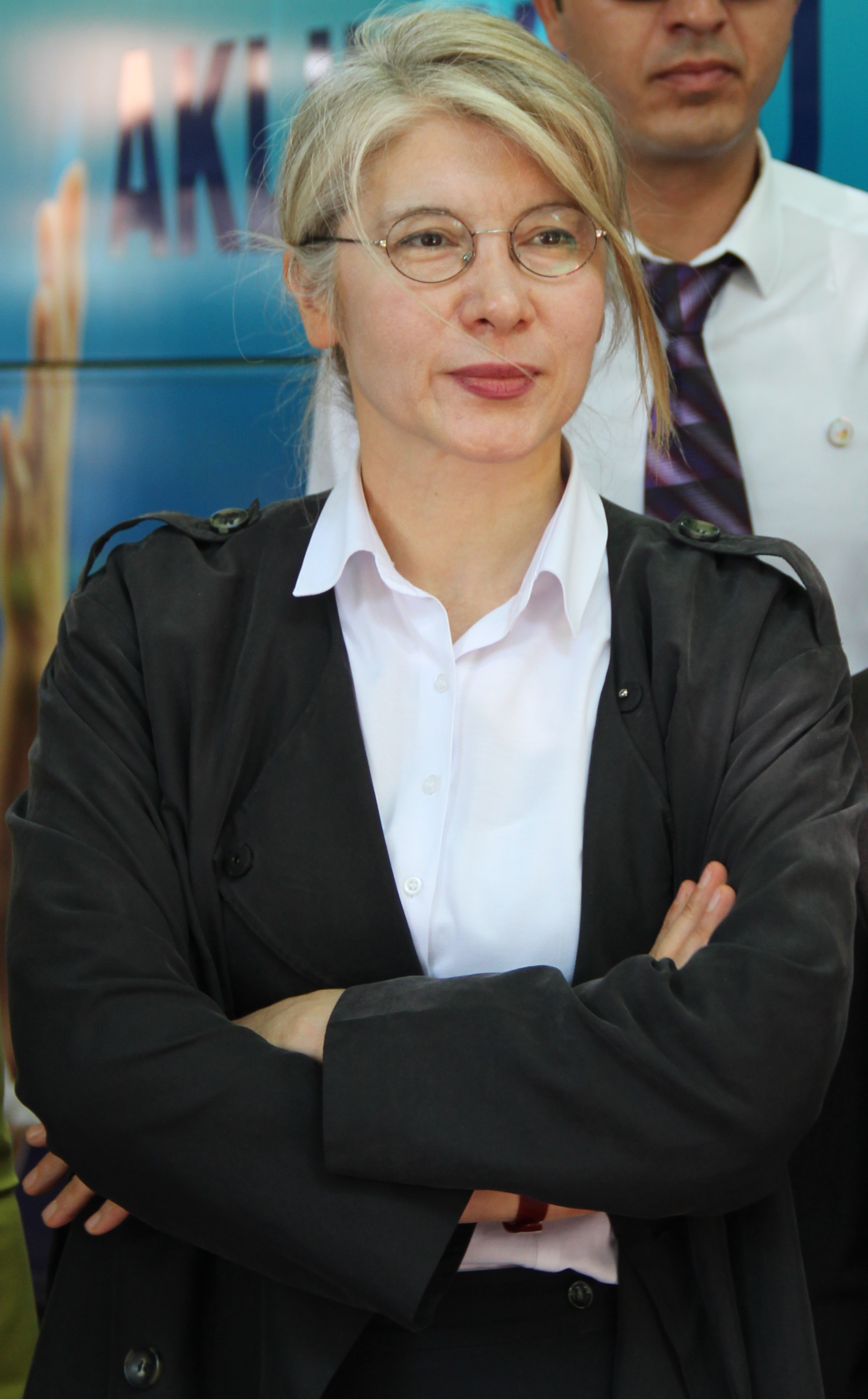
Emine Ülker Tarhan, CHP Member of Parliament for Ankara

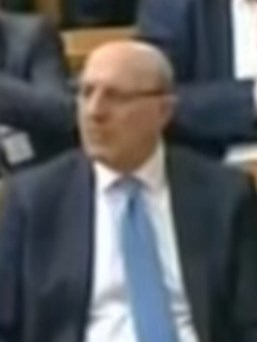
İlhan Kesici, CHP Member of Parliament for Istanbul

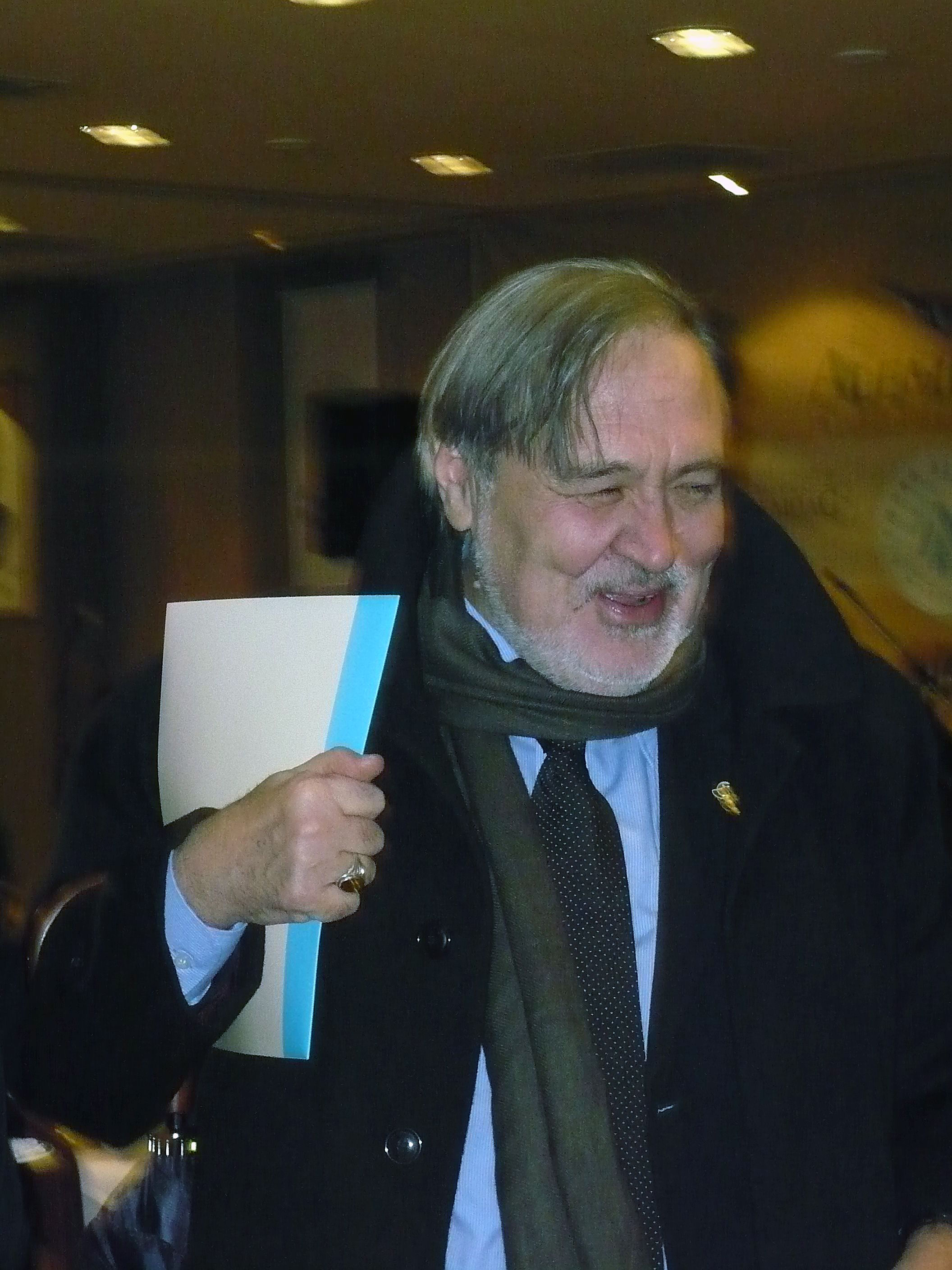
İlber Ortaylı, Turkish historian

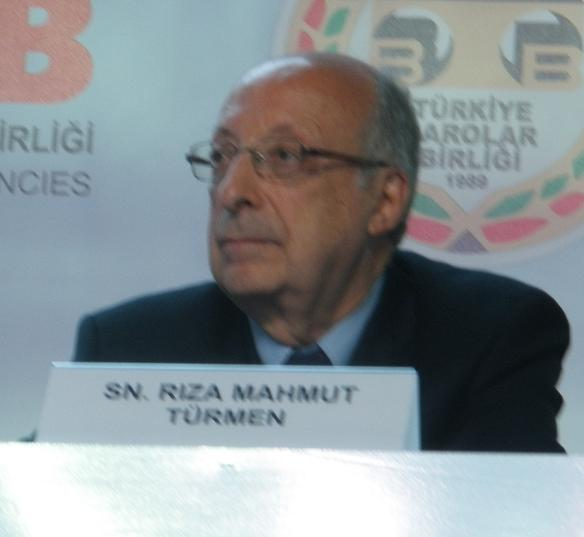
Rıza Türmen, former judge of the European Court of Human Rights

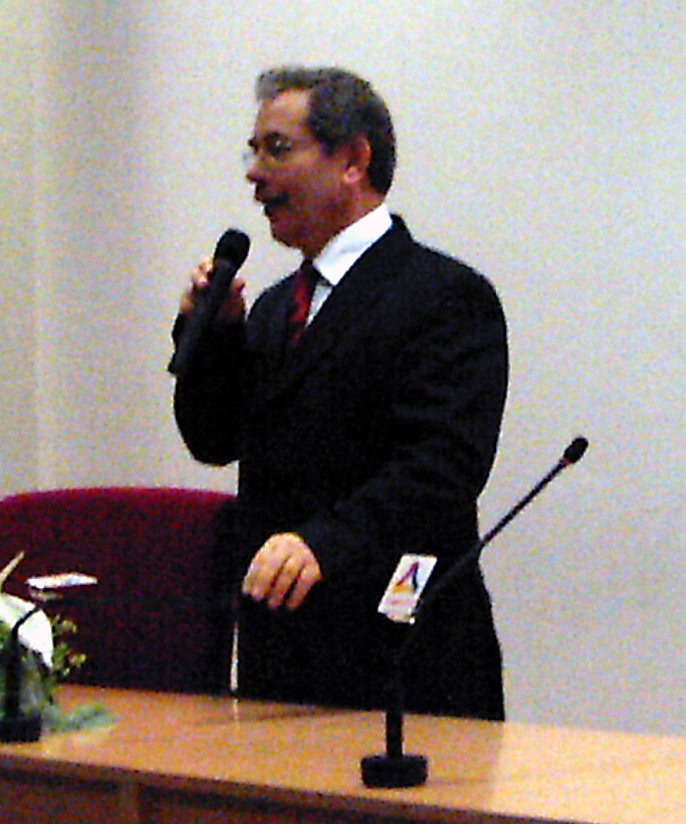
Abdüllatif Şener, former Deputy Prime Minister of Turkey and founder of the Turkey Party

==== Nationalist Movement Party (MHP) ====
Prior to joint attempts by the CHP and MHP to nominate a single candidate, the following list contains Nationalist Movement Party politicians who were speculated to be potential MHP presidential candidates, as well as the final agreed candidate Ekmeleddin İhsanoğlu.

- Ekmeleddin İhsanoğlu, former Secretary General of the Organisation of Islamic Co-operation, recommended by Kemal Derviş
- Devlet Bahçeli, MHP leader since 1997
- Oktay Vural, MHP Member of Parliament from İzmir and MHP parliamentary group leader
- Meral Akşener – Vice speaker of the Grand National Assembly and former Interior Minister. MHP MP from Istanbul and supported by the CHP
- Yıldırım Tuğrul Türkeş – eldest son of MHP founder Alparslan Türkeş and MP for Ankara
- Engin Alan – former general and MHP Istanbul MP charged for his role in the Sledgehammer Coup Plan
- Abdullah Gül – 24th Prime Minister of Turkey and 11th President of Turkey
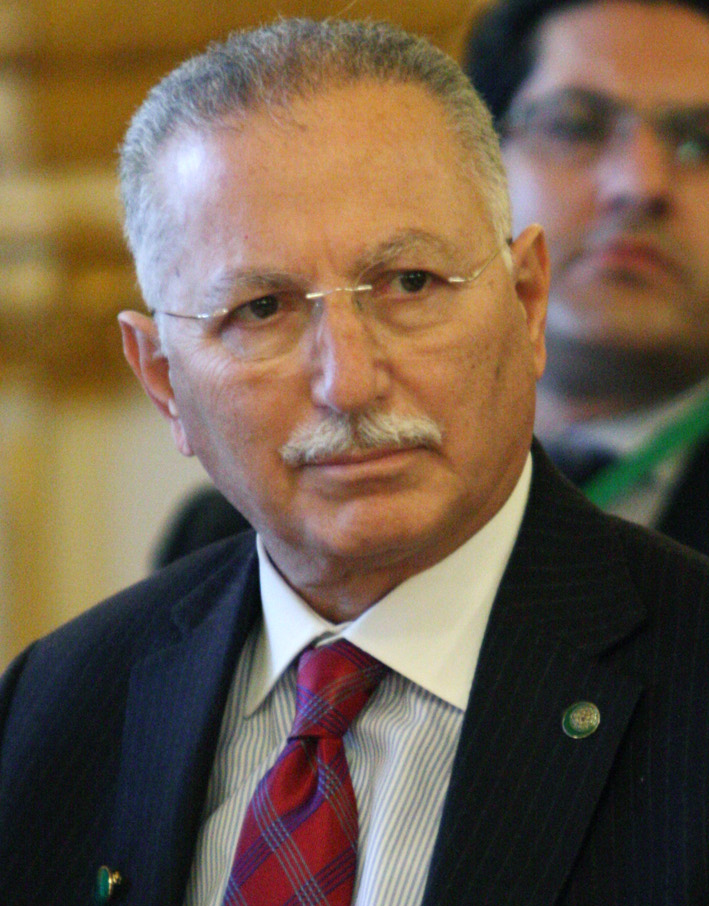
Ekmeleddin İhsanoğlu, former secretary general of the Organisation of Islamic Co-operation, recommended by Kemal Derviş.

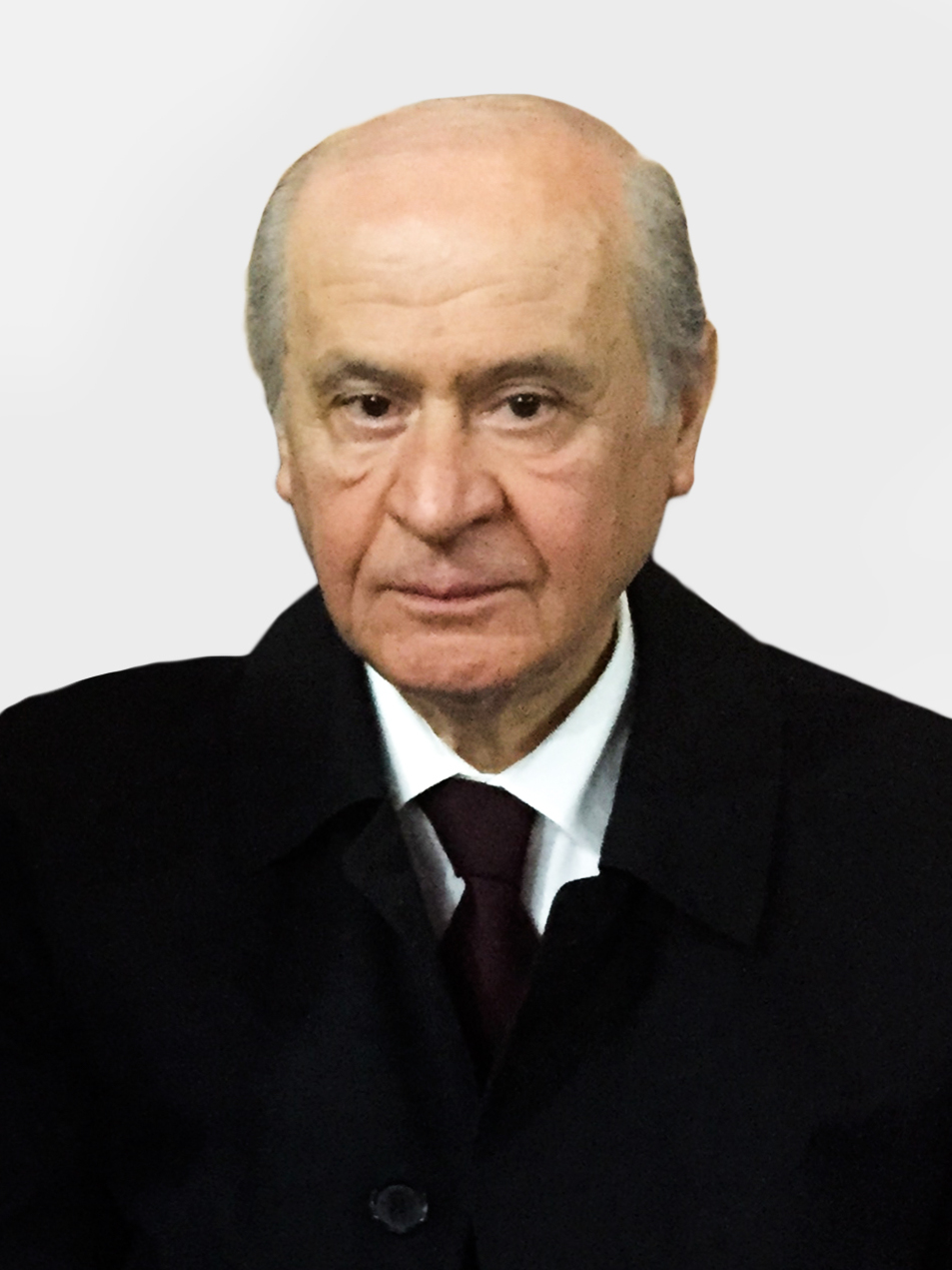
Devlet Bahçeli, MHP leader since 1997.

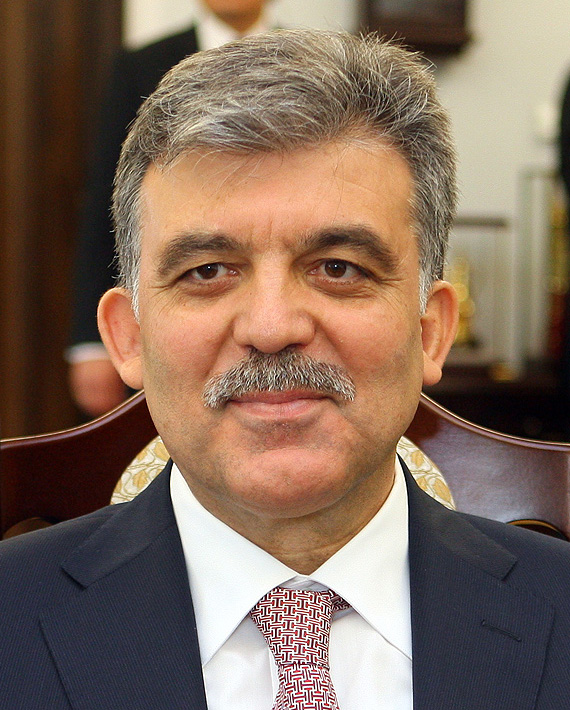
Abdullah Gül – 24th prime minister of Turkey and 11th president of Turkey

==== Peoples' Democratic Party (HDP) ====
The Peoples' Democratic Party (HDP) nominated co-leader Selahattin Demirtaş as their presidential candidate on 30 June 2014. Figen Yüksekdağ, the HDP's other co-leader, was also seen as a potential candidate especially since the party was a strong supporter of women's and minority rights.

- Selahattin Demirtaş, co-leader of the HDP
- Figen Yüksekdağ, co-leader of the HDP
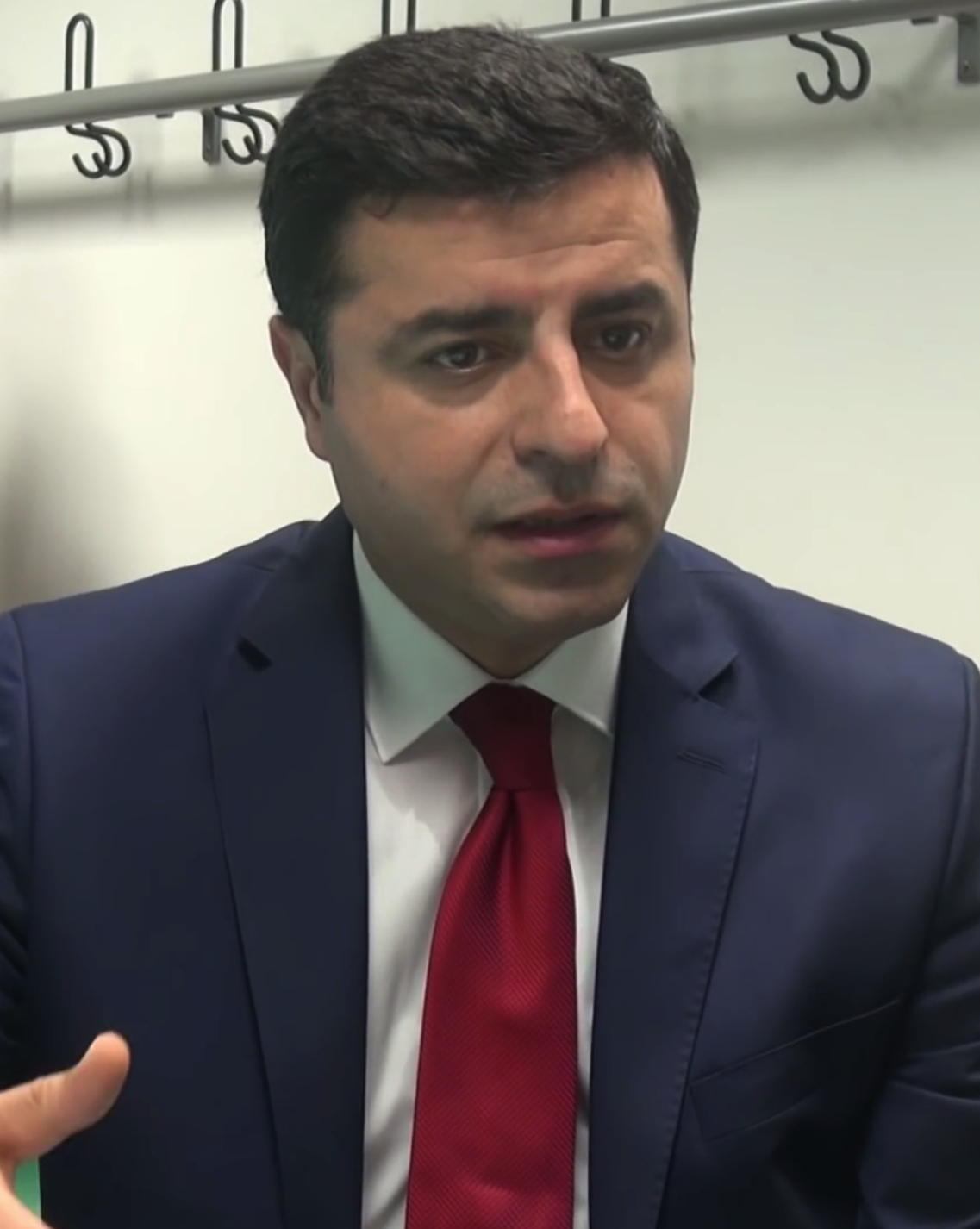
Selahattin Demirtaş, co-leader of the HDP

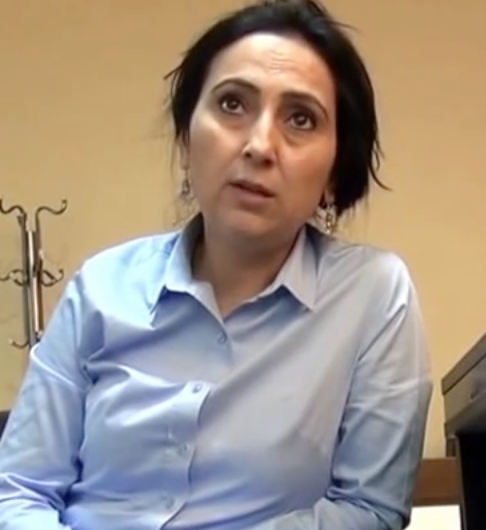
Figen Yüksekdağ, co-leader of the HDP

==== Others ====
- Osman Pamukoğlu, retired general and leader of the Rights and Equality Party (HEPAR), with a petition urging 20 MPs to back his candidacy emerging on Change.org.
- Masum Türker, leader and declared candidate of the Democratic Left Party (DSP)
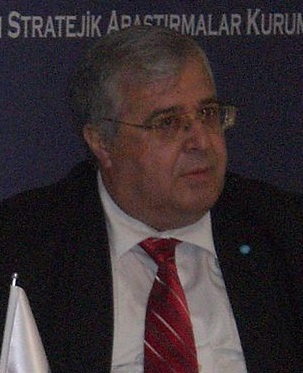
Masum Türker, leader and declared candidate of the Democratic Left Party (DSP)

=== List of parties by presidential candidates ===
List of parties by presidential candidates

Abbreviation	Party name in English	Presidential candidate
AK Party	Justice and Development Party	Recep Tayyip Erdoğan
ANAP	Motherland Party	Recep Tayyip Erdoğan
CHP	Republican People's Party	Ekmeleddin İhsanoğlu
MHP	Nationalist Movement Party	Ekmeleddin İhsanoğlu
DP	Democratic Party	Ekmeleddin İhsanoğlu
DSP	Democratic Left Party	Ekmeleddin İhsanoğlu
BTP	Independent Turkey Party	Ekmeleddin İhsanoğlu
LDP	Liberal Democratic Party	Ekmeleddin İhsanoğlu
BBP	Great Union Party	Ekmeleddin İhsanoğlu
DEV Party	Revolutionary People's Party	Ekmeleddin İhsanoğlu
TSIP	Socialist Workers' Party of Turkey	Ekmeleddin İhsanoğlu
DYP	True Path Party	Ekmeleddin İhsanoğlu
HAP	Rights and Justice Party	Ekmeleddin İhsanoğlu
KP	Women's Party	Ekmeleddin İhsanoğlu
TURK Party	Social Reconciliation Reform and Development Party	Ekmeleddin İhsanoğlu
BAK	Great Anatolian Development Movement	Ekmeleddin İhsanoğlu
HDP	Peoples' Democratic Party	Selahattin Demirtaş
DBP	Democratic Regions Party	Selahattin Demirtaş
EMEP	Labour Party	Selahattin Demirtaş
ESP	Socialist Party of the Oppressed	Selahattin Demirtaş
EHP	Labourist Movement Party	Selahattin Demirtaş
DSİP	Revolutionary Socialist Workers' Party	Selahattin Demirtaş
SDP	Socialist Democracy Party	Selahattin Demirtaş
YSGP	Greens and the Left Party of the Future	Selahattin Demirtaş
SYKP	Socialist Party of Refoundation	Selahattin Demirtaş
MLKP	Marxist–Leninist Communist Party	Selahattin Demirtaş
İP	Workers' Party	Emine Ülker Tarhan
TKP	Communist Party of Turkey	None
SP	Felicity Party	None
HEPAR	Rights and Equality Party	None
ÖDP	Freedom and Solidarity Party	None
YURT-P	Homeland Party	None
HAK-PAR	Rights and Freedoms Party	None
MP	Nation Party	None
HÜDA PAR	Free Cause Party	None
MEP	Centre Party	None

== Campaigns ==
The Supreme Electoral Council of Turkey declared that the campaigning for the first round of the election would take place between 11 July and 9 August. For the run-off planned for 24 August, campaigning would have taken place between 11 and 23 August. The campaigns of all three candidates centred mainly on the 2014 Israel–Gaza conflict, the peace process with PKK rebels, the Gezi Park protests and 17 December 2013 government corruption scandal.

=== Erdoğan campaign ===
Incumbent Prime Minister Recep Tayyip Erdoğan formally announced his candidacy for the presidency on 1 July 2014 in a speech that lasted just over an hour. Speculation that he would be the AKP's candidate was widespread long before the announcement. On the same day, the Erdoğan logo was unveiled, and received criticism for bearing resemblance to the Obama 2008 presidential election campaign logo, as well as the Holiday Place logo. A tweet from the finance minister, Mehmet Şimşek, which claimed that the logo has Arabic calligraphy of the Prophet Muhammad's name also sparked debate over the use of religion in the political campaign. Erdoğan's campaign slogan is "Milli İrade, Milli Güç, Hedef 2023" (National Will, National Strength, Target 2023). On 11 July, Erdoğan unveiled a new campaign song and slogan, "Yeni Türkiye Yolunda Demokrasi, Refah, İtibar" (Democracy, Prosperity and Prestige on the Road to a New Turkey).

Erdoğan's campaign has been dominated by electoral rallies, beginning in Samsun on 5 July and then moving to Erzurum, mimicking Mustafa Kemal Atatürk's route which he took at the start of the Turkish War of Independence. His rally speeches mainly centred on his achievements as prime minister and also contained frequent attacks on both the opposition as well as Fethullah Gülen, the leader of the Hizmet Movement living in Pennsylvania. During his Hatay rally on 21 July, he accused Gülen of not speaking out on behalf of the Palestinians in Gaza and accused Israel of "following in the footsteps of Hitler". During his Kahramanmaraş rally on 1 August, he claimed that the opposition CHP was supporting Israel during the Gaza crisis.

During his electoral rally in Van, Erdoğan attacked his rival Ekmeleddin İhsanoğlu for allegedly mistaking the Independence March, the Turkish national anthem, for a poem composed for the fallen soldiers at Çanakkale during the Gallipoli Campaign. In his Kahramanmaraş rally on 1 August, he showed the crowd a video of İhsanoğlu misreading the Independence March.

In addition to his electoral rallies, AKP activists have also launched a door-to-door operation in order to gather support by delivering food, clothing and other items to families. According to the OSCE, the Erdoğan campaign has also organised iftar tents during the month of Ramadan and has distributed toys and women's scarves at electoral rallies. On 15 July 2014, the government began a huge distribution of free coal to families in İzmir.

On 9 August, Erdoğan announced that he had received 1,350,796 donations, totaling ₺55,260,798 (approximately US$25,560,037). The scale of the donations and their magnitude in comparison with the other two candidates' funds resulted in several allegations of fraud being made by the political opposition.

=== İhsanoğlu campaign ===
Ekmeleddin İhsanoğlu was announced as the joint candidate of the Republican People's Party (CHP) and the Nationalist Movement Party (MHP) on 16 June 2014. The decision drew criticism from many CHP supporters due to his former role as Secretary General of the Organisation of Islamic Cooperation, which some members of the CHP saw as an organisation which lacked secular and Kemalist credentials. An opinion poll on show of 23 Juneed that only 32% of CHP supporters were happy with their party's choice of candidate, compared to 75% of MHP supporters. Meanwhile, 68% of CHP supporters were dissatisfied with the decision, compared to only 25% of MHP supporters. In response to the controversy over his secular credentials, İhsanoğlu stated on 26 June that he thought of Mustafa Kemal Atatürk as a "national hero" and that he had defended secularism in many of his books. On 4 July, he stated that he is "not an enemy of Atatürk," and that "incorporating religion into politics will lead to trouble." Former CHP leader Deniz Baykal, who was seen as a potential CHP nominee, criticised İhsanoğlu's candidacy, stating that the CHP and MHP should have held a vote amongst their members to choose a candidate.

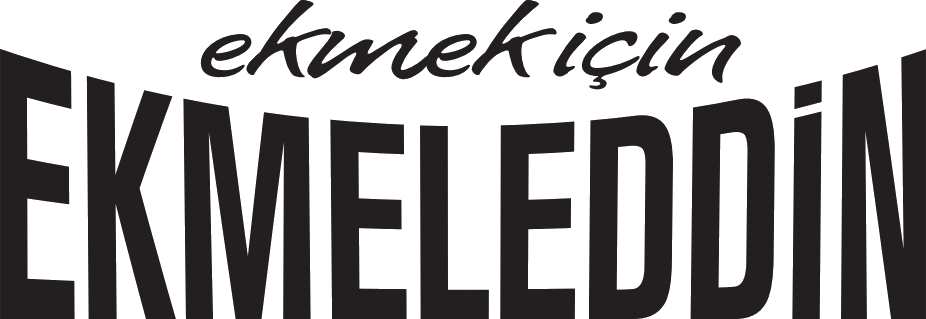
"Ekmek İçin Ekmeleddin" logo

Controversy arose over the allegations that İhsanoğlu had been a potential AKP candidate in the 2007 presidential election if Abdullah Gül was unable to win parliamentary approval. However, Gül was elected president with the help of the Nationalist Movement Party. İhsanoğlu himself stated that he had been on friendly terms with Erdoğan. He visited the serving president Abdullah Gül on 3 July.

On 7 July, İhsanoğlu stated that he would not base his campaign on election rallies, stating, "how right is it to force people outside under the heat in this holy month of Ramadan? When are we going to hold the rallies, before sahur or after iftar? We are visiting our provinces and districts, meeting local leaders and visiting our people." He also expressed his wish to hold a live televised debate with Erdoğan. Following the conclusion of Ramadan, İhsanoğlu held his first election rally in Hatay on 2 August, reiterating his support for state secularism. İhsanoğlu's campaign slogan is "Ekmek için Ekmeleddin" (Ekmeleddin for bread), other slogans which will be used for the campaign include "Ekmeleddin to cultivate love, to cultivate prosperity and for bread." "Ekmek" means "to cultivate" at the same time.

Following Erdoğan's accusation that İhsanoğlu did not know the Independence March, İhsanoğlu responded by saying that since the author of the March, Mehmet Akif Ersoy was the best friend of his father, he had already learnt the anthem as a baby. In a statement, he claimed that the video that Erdoğan showed during his Kahramanmaraş rally was "doctored," and that he had "translated this unrivalled piece into Arabic, how is it possible that I wouldn't know it?" On 2 August, the pro-opposition newspaper Sözcü published footage of Recep Tayyip Erdoğan himself misreading the Independence March.

On 16 July, İhsanoğlu visited the Palestinian embassy in Ankara, denying reports that he had said on 4 July that Turkey should remain "neutral" in the Israeli-Palestinian issue. In a statement, he said that "I have never advocated Turkish neutrality. You cannot be neutral between the cruel and the oppressed." On 19 July, he stated that Palestine should take their case to the International Criminal Court.

In his vision, İhsanoğlu vowed to protect democracy, the rule of law, the separation of powers, the principles of Atatürk and national unity. He also advocated waiving the debts of Turkey's poorest citizens. He further stressed the need for greater involvement of non-governmental organisations as well as local authorities in the decision-making process in order to strengthen democracy. In addition, he stresses the importance of environmental protection, greater rights to women and educational assistance to the nation's poorest children in order to turn Turkey into a "nation of knowledge" such as South Korea. İhsanoğlu states that because he is not the candidate of a single party, he would be able to solve national tensions between the opposition and government as well as bring about peace and stability to both Turkey and to the world through foreign policy.

On 9 August, İhsanoğlu announced that he had received a total of ₺8.5 million (approximately US$3.93 million) in donations to his campaign.

=== Demirtaş campaign ===
Selahattin Demirtaş was announced as a candidate for the presidency on 30 June. In a campaign dominated by the peace process with Kurdish rebels, he claimed on 5 August in Van that the government of Recep Tayyip Erdoğan had not done enough to bring forward promised legislation, and that the process would collapse immediately if the AKP did not do more to bring lasting peace in the southeast. He is the co-leader of the Peoples' Democratic Party (HDP), serving alongside Figen Yüksekdağ.

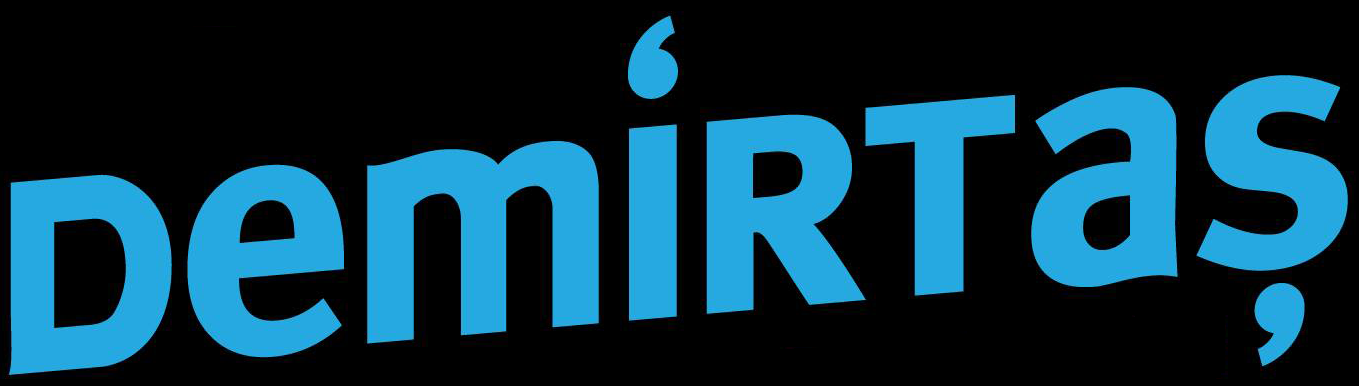
Selahattin Demirtaş's election campaign logo

On 15 July, Demirtaş outlined his road-map for his presidency should he win the election. In a speech lasting just under an hour, he proposed that the Presidency of Religious Affairs (Diyanet) should be disbanded, that compulsory religion lessons in schools should be removed and that Cemevis (the Alevi houses of worship) should receive national recognition. He also proposed the introduction of "People's Parliaments" (Cumhur meclisleri), which would also incorporate Youth Parliaments to increase representation of young citizens. Pushing for a new constitution, Demirtaş outlined the need to end the non-representation of different cultures, languages, races and beliefs without delay to ensure national stability. Also in his speech, he praised the Gezi Park protests and displayed photos of himself during the events. He continued to direct applause to the mother of the murdered teenager Berkin Elvan, who died 269 days after being hit by a tear gas canister during the protests and falling into a coma. On the issue of the lack of Turkish flags within the hall in which he was delivering his speech, Demirtaş stated that the Turkish flag represented all citizens of Turkey. His slogan is "Bir Cumhurbaşkanı Düşün" (Imagine a President...), which is followed by several different phrases, such as "Bir Cumhurbaşkanı Düşünün Ayrımcılık yapmıyor. Birleştiriyor, barıştırıyor." (Imagine a President who doesn't Discriminate, who Unites and makes Peace) or "Bir Cumhurbaşkanı Düşünün Herkese Demokrat" (Imagine a President who is Democratic to Everybody).

On 18 July, Demirtaş visited Paris, France, and laid flowers at the scene where three Kurdish activists were shot dead on 9 January 2013.

On 9 August, Demirtaş announced that he had received approximately ₺1,213,000 (US$561,055) in donations.

== Conduct ==
=== Constitutional issues ===
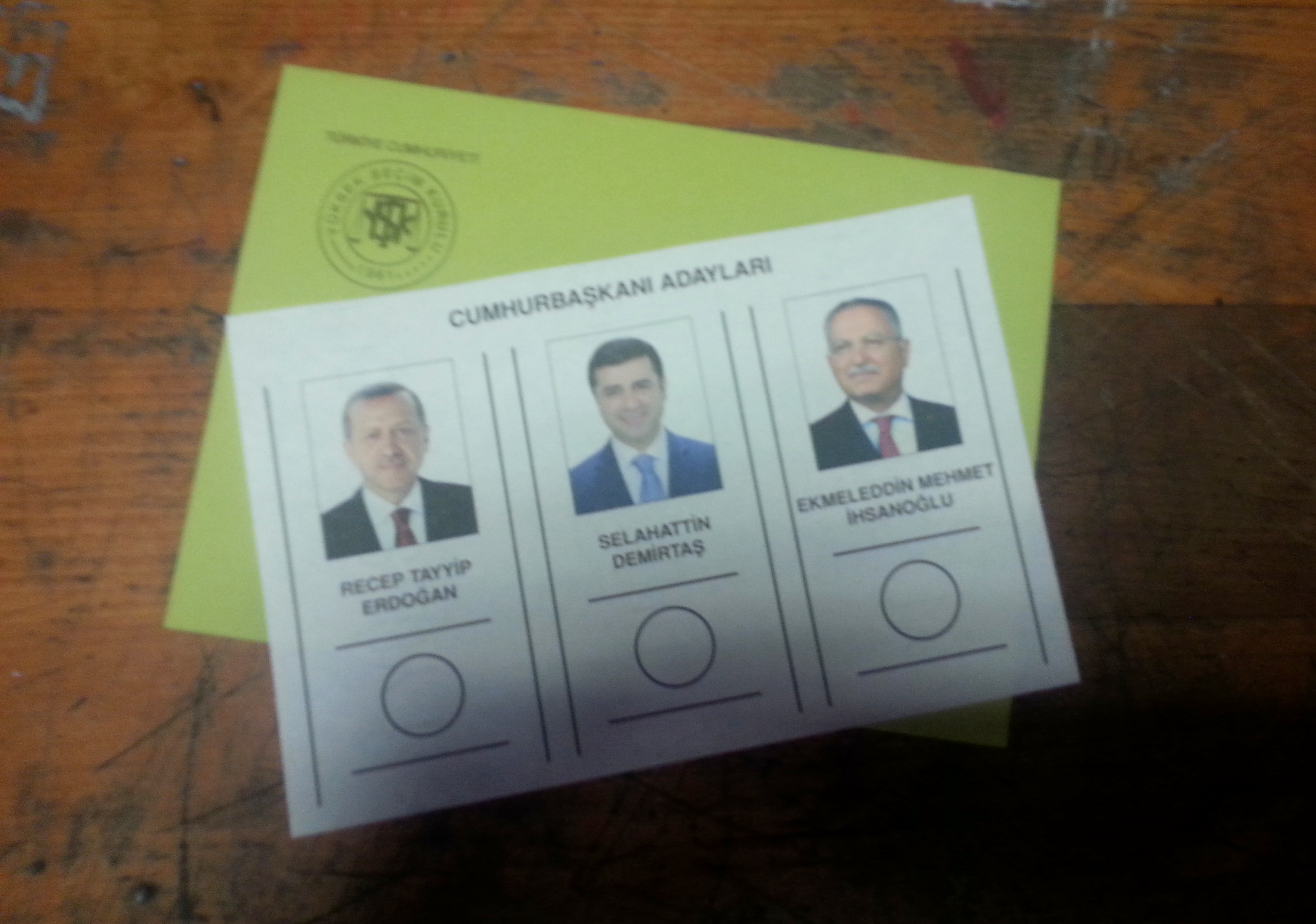
Ballot paper and envelope which includes the names and photos of candidates for the presidential election

Upon the announcement of Recep Tayyip Erdoğan's candidacy, the CHP, LDP and MHP contested his refusal to resign as prime minister during the campaign. The case was taken to the Supreme Electoral Council by both the MHP and Mahmut Tanal, a CHP MP from Istanbul on 9 July. In a press statement, Tanal also attributed the case to the alleged incompatibility of Erdoğan's ideologies and the history of his premiership to the office of the presidency and referred to the 2008 judicial verdict which curbed the AKP's state funding due to the "violations of democratic and secular principles." The Constitutional Court affirmed Erdoğan's eligibility to remain as prime minister while standing as a presidential candidate on 24 July.

=== Misuse of public funds ===
In a report released by the Office for Democratic Institutions and Human Rights (ODIHR) and the Organization for Security and Co-operation in Europe (OSCE) on 31 July, Erdoğan was criticised for the alleged use of public funds to finance his campaign. In addition to the distribution of free coal in İzmir, the OSCE also noted that the campaign had begun an excessive distribution of food, clothing, toys, cups, mouse mats and scarves both at election rallies and during door-to-door canvassing. Both the rival candidates and the OSCE have called for greater transparency regarding the financing of Erdoğan's campaign, and the latter has decided to send a delegation to monitor the elections on 10 August.

Further accusation over the use of public resources in Erdoğan's campaign have been fueled by opposition journalists, who have accused Erdoğan of using a fake license plates to disguise his use of an official car during his campaign. Journalists have also drawn attention to the alleged use of official helicopters and planes by the Prime Minister to fly between election rally destinations, despite the requirement by law which restricts the use of such transport for official duties only. Following the accusations, a CHP MP from Istanbul, Umut Oran, brought claims of the misuse of public resources before the Supreme Electoral Council and requested an audit into donations to Erdoğan's campaign. In response to the claims that Erdoğan used fake license plates, the Turkish Prime Ministry issued a statement on 1 August stating that all four cars used by Erdoğan during the campaign had been rented, and that one license plate (06 BV 8534) which had been accused of being fake had been accidentally misprinted and was in fact 06 BV 8543.

On 6 August, it emerged that the Ministry of National Education (MEB) had printed an exam revision guide which included Recep Tayyip Erdoğan in the list of Turkish presidents four days before the election took place. The leader of the guide's distributor, Ahmet Gündoğdu, stated that "this is a known outcome. Even if he doesn't win on the first round, Recep Tayyip Erdoğan will definitely win on the second. If he doesn't, we'll only have misprinted the questions – but he will." On the same day, the MEB issued a formal statement which denied the claims that they had assumed the election result before it had taken place, stating that the book in question was in fact a book about Atatürk's principles and history, and that no changes had been made to it since 2008.

=== Media bias ===
On 1 August, several online newspapers reported that the Anatolian Agency had used what seemed to be pre-determined election results while doing a practice run for their election night coverage. Leaked images of teleprompter text allegedly showed the Anatolian Agency using pre-determined election turnouts and results which placed Recep Tayyip Erdoğan firmly in first place in six provinces, with 73% in Bartın, 82% in Rize, 80% in Gümüşhane, 70% in Kahramanmaraş, 75% in Konya and 80% in Isparta. However, the authenticity of the leaked images have not been verified and newspapers which reported the news did not name a source.

The British Newspaper The Times claimed that between 2 and 4 July, the state-owned media channel TRT gave 204 minutes of coverage to Erdoğan's campaign and less than a total of 3 minutes to both his rivals.

The OSCE drew attention to the fact that Erdoğan used the opening of the Ankara-Istanbul high-speed railway on 25 July to promote his candidacy, and has criticised the "limited public visibility of the other candidates" in contrast to Erdoğan's huge and widely broadcast electoral rallies.

Erdoğan was internationally criticised when he called Amberin Zaman from The Economist a 'shameless militant' and told her to 'know her place' on 8 August.

=== Overprinting of ballot papers ===
The Supreme Electoral Council of Turkey (YSK) repeated its highly controversial decision which it initially took in the local elections to print a substantial amount of ballot papers more than necessary, totalling 75,708,180. It was reported that the YSK had printed 18 million more ballot papers more than the total number of registered voters. The YSK responded to questions regarding its decision by stating that it was required by law to print extra ballot papers. The YSK president Sadi Güven also stated that the uncertainty of how many people would vote at customs gates was also a factor behind the decision to send a disproportionately large number of ballot papers to national borders. However, the OSCE stated that there was no legal basis for printing such a large amount of ballot papers.

Presidential candidate Ekmeleddin İhsanoğlu raised concern over the high number of spare ballot papers, stating that "of course some might go to waste in rain, mud or a flood, but what does printing 18 million mean? How, for whom, are these ballot papers going to be used, and how will it be ensured that they will not fall into the wrong hands?" In retaliation, Deputy Prime Minister Emrullah İşler claimed that the opposition was trying to cover up its poor standing in the opinion polls.

=== Donations ===
The substantially larger amount of donations received by Erdoğan resulted in the political opposition requesting an audit into all donations made to his campaign. On 6 August, a CHP Member of Parliament from Konya, Atilla Kart, claimed that the Konya Industrial Board had begun a fundraising campaign for Erdoğan, placing the nature of donations, their source and their transparency under scrutiny.

=== Campaigning irregularities ===
Controversy surrounded the role and use of the Turkish flag by the candidates for their election campaigns. The Supreme Electoral Council had controversially regulated its use previously for the local elections. In İhsanoğlu's earlier election adverts, subtitles notified viewers that they had been banned from including the Turkish flag in the advert by the Electoral Council.

The use of religion in the campaigns also fuelled controversy. Erdoğan's campaign logo, which had already generated controversy due to its resemblance of Barack Obama's 2008 presidential campaign logo, had been claimed to have Arabic calligraphy of the Prophet Muhammad's name by the finance minister Mehmet Şimşek. On 5 August, the Supreme Electoral Council banned an Erdoğan campaign advertisement on the grounds that it "abused religious feelings by depicting the Azan, a prayer mat and a woman performing Namaz."

On 7 August, it was reported that security forces prevented citizens attending Erdoğan's Gaziantep rally from leaving early. One person was detained at the scene.

=== Voter data irregularities ===
On 8 August, a voter from Didim, Aydın claimed that four unknown voters were recorded to have been living in his household according to the Supreme Electoral Council. The lack of up-to-date voter data, which listed dead persons as voters as well as addresses that did not exist had previously resulted in huge controversy in the 2014 local elections.

=== Election day ===
Presidential candidate Ekmeleddin İhsanoğlu expressed his concern about voters taking pictures of ballot papers on polling day. Despite this, the OSCE and other international observers praised the peaceful voting and counting process.

=== Google Doodle ===
On the day of the election, Google changed their logo on the Turkish version of the search engine to represent the election. The second 'g' in 'Google' was changed to a ballot box with a Turkish flag, with a ballot being cast. The doodle generated controversy since the ballot was shown to have three options with the final option ticked. The format of the doodle had been used before to represent the 2014 European Parliament election, but generated criticism since the presidential election actually had three candidates. Since Ekmeleddin İhsanoğlu was the third candidate on the actual ballot paper, the doodle was seen by some as an endorsement of İhsanoğlu. However, Republican People's Party (CHP) politicians also criticised the doodle since it could also be interpreted as an endorsement for Recep Tayyip Erdoğan, in that the doodle's ballot paper turned landscape (similar to the actual ballot paper) actually shows a vote for Erdoğan in the first row.

Following a complaint by the CHP to the Supreme Electoral Council, the council decided that the logo should be removed for depicting a vote for a certain candidate.

== Opinion polls ==
Opinion polls in Turkey are highly controversial since several of them have links with political establishments, thus making them heavily subject to bias in some cases. SONAR and Gezici are known to be close with the opposition CHP, while POLLMARK and ANAR are associated with the AKP. A&G is a polling company from social democratic origins, however its ownership is heavily critical of the CHP and MHP.

Despite their political affiliations both in favour and against Recep Tayyip Erdoğan, all opinion polls conducted throughout the campaigning process put Erdoğan in the lead by wide margins. This even included a poll by the CHP itself, which also put Erdoğan marginally ahead of Ekmeleddin İhsanoğlu. Opinion polls have also been criticised for inaccurate predictions. After the election, the polling company KONDA publicly apologised for vast inaccuracies in its polls when compared with the actual results.

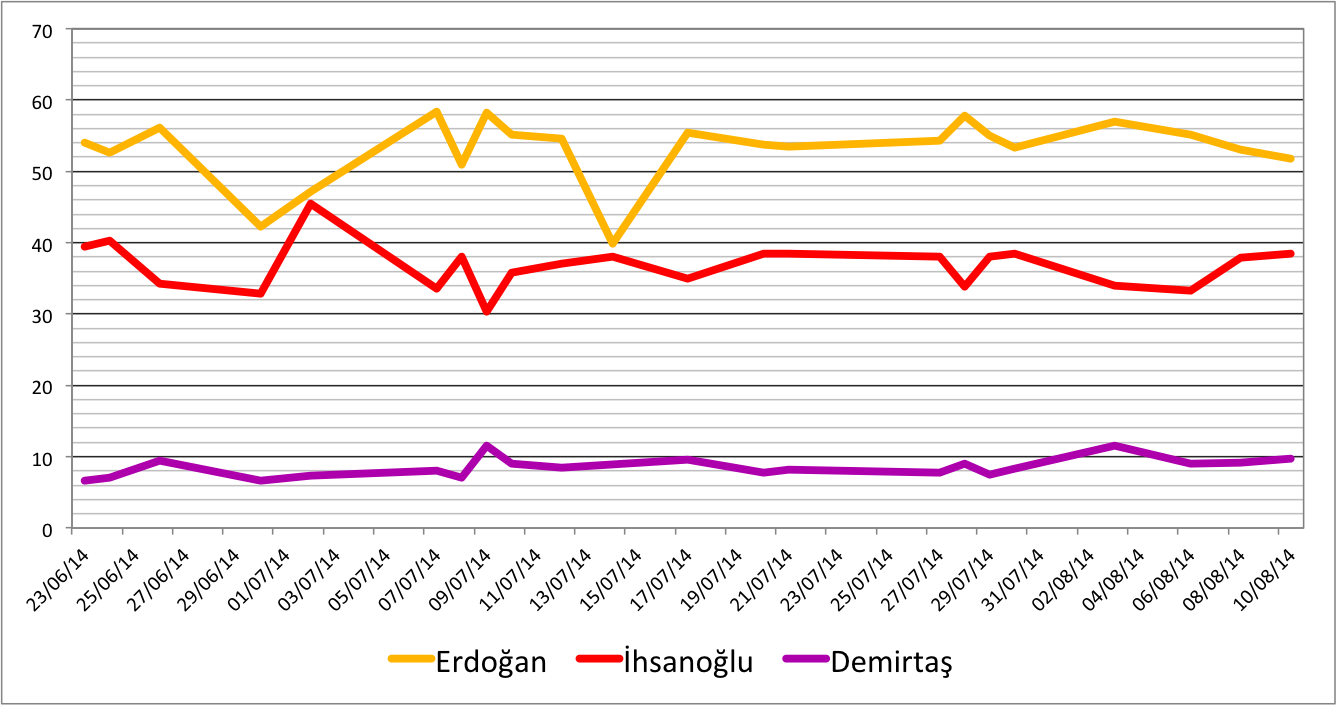
Opinion polling for the election, ranging from 23 June to results on 10 August

Date	Company	Erdoğan	İhsanoğlu	Demirtaş	Lead
23 June 2014	ORC	54.0	39.4	6.6	14.6
24 June 2014	SONAR	52.6	40.3	7.1	12.3
26 June 2014	MAK	56.1	34.2	9.5	21.9
30 June 2014	MetroPOLL	42.2	32.9	6.7	9.3
2 July 2014	Gezici	47.2	45.5	7.3	1.7
7 July 2014	DESAV	58.4	33.5	8.1	24.9
7 July 2014	Pollmark	51.0	38.0	7.0	13.0
9 July 2014	Konsensus	58.2	30.3	11.5	27.9
9 July 2014	GENAR	55.2	35.8	9.0	19.4
12 July 2014	ORC	54.6	37.0	8.4	17.6
14 July 2014	CHP	39.8	38.1	N/A	1.7
17 July 2014	Andy-Ar	55.5	34.9	9.6	20.6
20 July 2014	Optimar	53.8	38.4	7.8	15.4
21 July 2014	Gezici	53.4	38.4	8.2	15.0
22 July 2014	TÜSİAR	54.9	38.2	6.9	16.7
27 July 2014	ORC	54.3	38.0	7.7	16.3
27 July 2014	Ajans Press	57.82	33.82	9.04	24.00
29 July 2014	Konda	55.0	38.0	7.5	17.0
30 July 2014	SONAR	53.3	38.4	8.3	14.9
1 August 2014	Paradigma	46.9	37.7	10.3	9.2
3 August 2014	Konda	57.0	34.0	11.6	23.0
6 August 2014	A&G	55.1	33.3	9.0	21.8
8 August 2014	Andy-Ar	53.0	37.9	9.1	15.1
Average		53.11	36.71	8.35	16.40
10 August 2014	Election results	51.79	38.44	9.76	13.35

== Conduct ==
=== Voting process ===
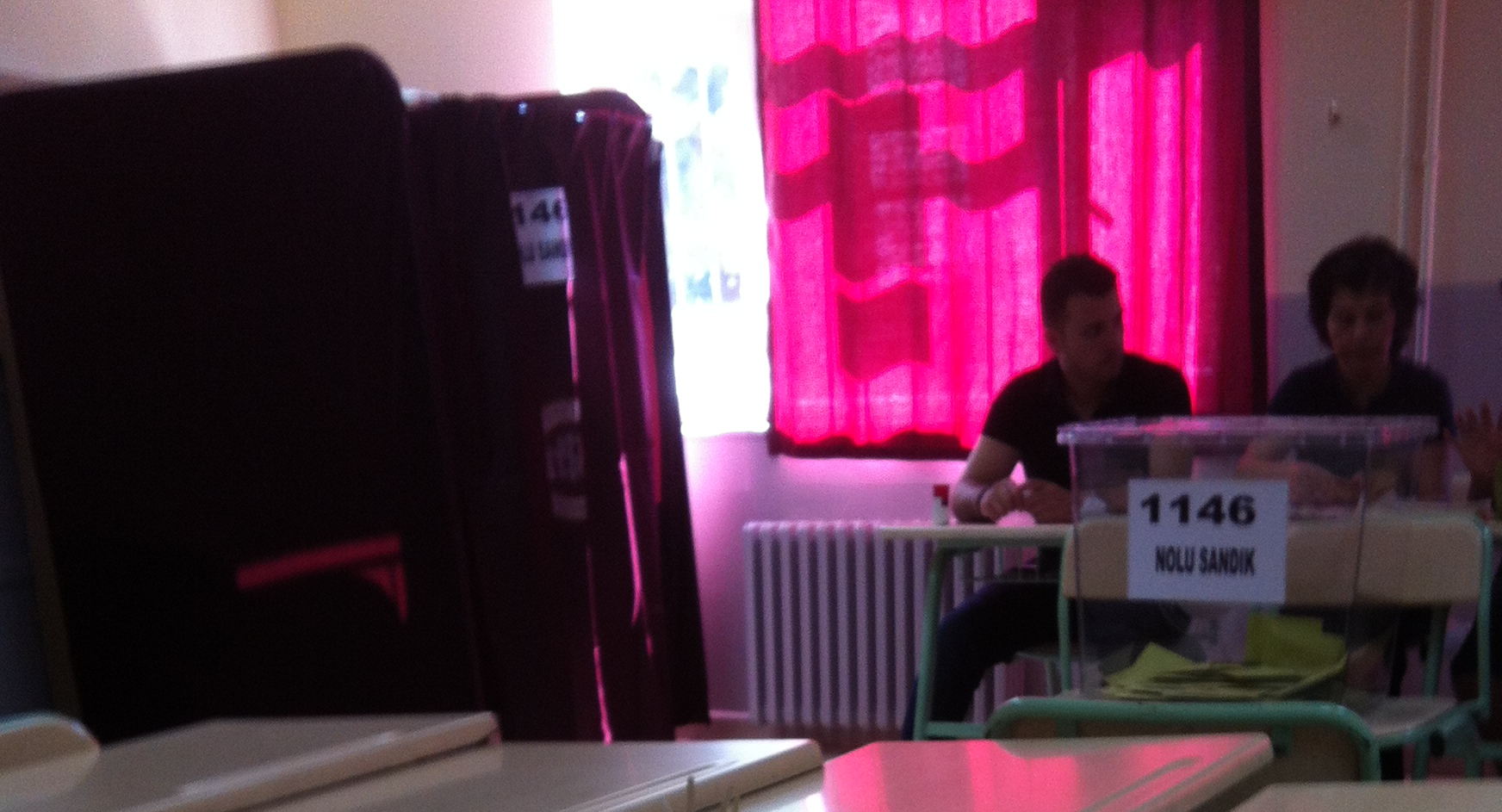
An example of a ballot box and voting area during the election

The number of ballot boxes for the election was 166,657. This meant that there was one ballot box per 334 voters. Istanbul had the highest number of ballot boxes in terms of province, totalling 25,921. Bayburt had the smallest number, with just 274. Boxes were made out of clear plastic and ballots were placed in envelopes before being cast. Voting began at 06:00 GMT and ended at 15:00 GMT (or 08:00-17:00 local time). In order to vote, citizens needed to present their identity cards or any officially stamped or signed document that contained their identity card number. Priority was given to disabled, elderly, ill and pregnant voters. The consumption of alcohol was banned throughout the election and the media was not allowed to broadcast any news regarding the election until 18:00 local time. Until 21:00 local time, media outlets could only publish official stories verified by the Supreme Electoral Council. Polling stations were usually schools, with classrooms usually containing one ballot box each. Two media agencies were reporting the results, namely the government owned Anatolia Agency and the privately run Cihan News Agency. These two agencies usually disagreed with each other's figures throughout counting. Due to potential influences by Kurdish separatists in Diyarbakır, the Turkish Armed Forces transported ballot papers for counting via army helicopter. Both Recep Tayyip Erdoğan and Ekmeleddin İhsanoğlu voted in Istanbul, while Selahattin Demirtaş voted in Diyarbakır.

There was heavy media speculation in regards to who Abdullah Gül, the outgoing president, voted for. Despite being a former AKP politician, an apparent rift between him and Erdoğan placed his voting intentions in doubt. Rumours had surfaced during the campaign that Gül had initially recommended Ekmeleddin İhsanoğlu to MHP leader Devlet Bahçeli, who in turn recommended him to CHP leader Kemal Kılıçdaroğlu. These turned out to be false when Kemal Derviş revealed that İhsanoğlu was his recommendation Kılıçdaroğlu. Gül voted in Çankaya, Ankara.

Former president Ahmet Necdet Sezer refused to vote, citing the lack of a secular candidate as his reason. This caused concern amongst İhsanoğlu's campaign team, since Sezer is seen as a figurehead for staunchly secular voters whom they were attempting to appeal to.

=== Overseas voting ===
Voting overseas began on 31 July and ended on 3 August. 2,783,660 overseas citizens were eligible to vote in 54 countries, and voting took place in 103 consulates. Voting at borders and customs started on 26 July and continued until 10 August. On 4 August, Deputy Prime Minister Emrullah İşler announced that 232,000 overseas voters cast their votes, with a turnout of 8.5%, while votes cast at borders and customs had reached 152,000. With the low turnout being attributed to the requirement to book an appointment to vote, it had previously emerged on 30 July that only 248,285 voters booked an appointment. It was seen as a setback for Recep Tayyip Erdoğan, who had been predicted half of the overseas vote. On 5 August, the owner of A&G research company Adil Gür stated that the overseas vote would not affect Erdoğan's chances of success.

== Results ==
Candidate	Party	Votes	%
Recep Tayyip Erdoğan	Justice and Development Party	21,000,143	51.79
Ekmeleddin İhsanoğlu	Independent	15,587,720	38.44
Selahattin Demirtaş	Peoples' Democratic Party	3,958,048	9.76
**Total**		**40,545,911**	**100.00**
Valid votes		40,545,911	98.21
Invalid/blank votes		737,716	1.79
Total votes		**41,283,627**	**100.00**
Registered voters/turnout		55,692,841	74.13
Source: YSK

=== Results by province ===
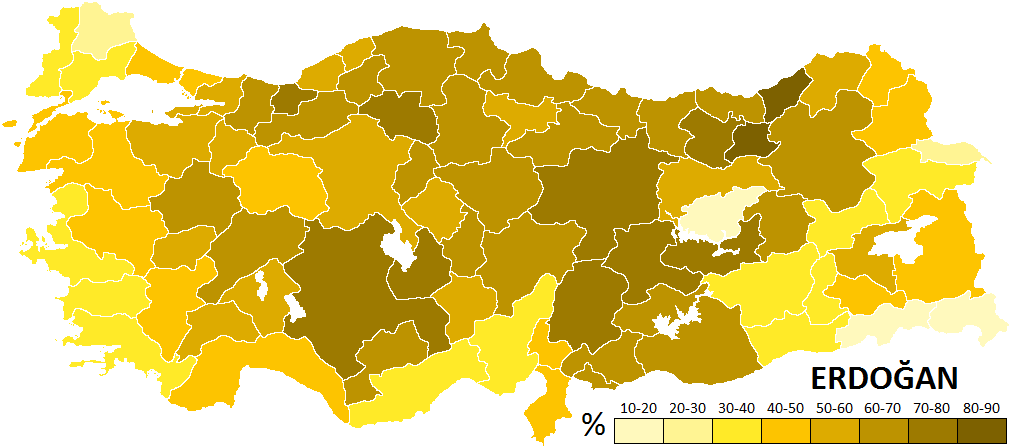
Results obtained by Recep Tayyip Erdoğan by province.

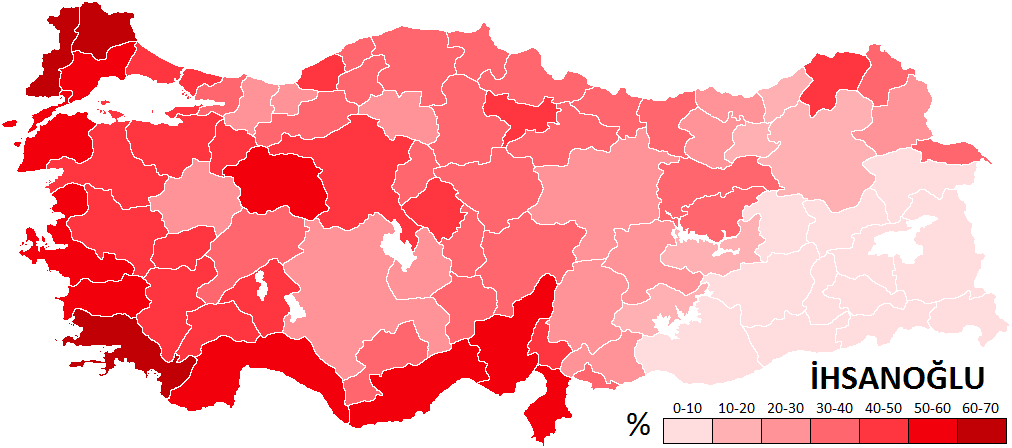
Results obtained by Ekmeleddin İhsanoğlu by province.

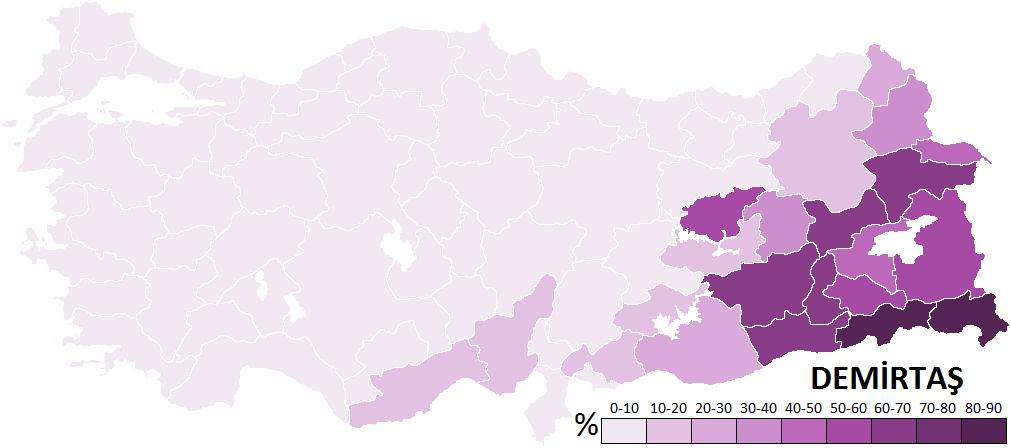
Results obtained by Selahattin Demirtaş by province.

Provinces are listed in order of license plate code. Metropolitan provinces are listed in bold. Erdoğan's family originated from Rize, but he himself was born in Istanbul. İhsanoğlu's family originated from Yozgat, but he himself was born in Cairo. Demirtaş is of Zaza origin and was born in Palu, Elazığ. The voting intentions of the candidates' provinces of origin are considered electorally significant in Turkish politics, yet Rize, Yozgat and Elazığ were all won by Erdoğan.

Province	Erdoğan	İhsanoğlu	Demirtaş
**Adana**	38.91%	**50.43%**	10.66%
Adıyaman	**69.30%**	15.44%	15.26%
Afyonkarahisar	**64.25%**	34.40%	1.36%
Ağrı	36.44%	2.27%	**61.28%**
Amasya	**56.66%**	42.17%	1.16%
**Ankara**	**51.31%**	45.22%	3.47%
**Antalya**	41.62%	**53.08%**	5.30%
Artvin	**52.62%**	44.94%	2.44%
**Aydın**	36.75%	**56.28%**	6.96%
**Balıkesir**	47.80%	**49.36%**	2.85%
Bilecik	**50.90%**	46.05%	3.04%
Bingöl	**65.05%**	4.40%	30.55%
Bitlis	**52.06%**	4.22%	43.72%
Bolu	**66.13%**	32.26%	1.61%
Burdur	**54.00%**	43.91%	2.09%
**Bursa**	**54.88%**	40.96%	4.16%
Çanakkale	41.90%	**55.37%**	2.73%
Çankırı	**73.69%**	25.30%	1.00%
Çorum	**63.76%**	34.71%	1.52%
**Denizli**	47.09%	**49.63%**	3.28%
**Diyarbakır**	33.48%	2.35%	**64.17%**
Edirne	32.18%	**64.96%**	2.86%
Elazığ	**70.56%**	18.55%	10.88%
Erzincan	**58.74%**	37.19%	4.07%
**Erzurum**	**68.80%**	18.13%	13.07%
**Eskişehir**	45.42%	**51.95%**	2.64%
**Gaziantep**	**60.44%**	29.00%	10.56%

Province	Erdoğan	İhsanoğlu	Demirtaş
Giresun	**66.64%**	31.94%	1.41%
Gümüşhane	**75.06%**	23.81%	1.14%
Hakkâri	16.36%	2.05%	**81.59%**
**Hatay**	44.11%	**52.29%**	3.60%
Isparta	**55.46%**	42.86%	1.68%
**Mersin**	31.98%	**54.56%**	13.46%
**Istanbul**	**49.83%**	41.08%	9.09%
**İzmir**	33.38%	**58.64%**	7.98%
Kars	**42.52%**	24.59%	32.89%
Kastamonu	**65.83%**	32.77%	1.40%
**Kayseri**	**66.13%**	32.02%	1.85%
Kırklareli	29.77%	**67.95%**	2.28%
Kırşehir	**52.82%**	42.21%	4.97%
**Kocaeli**	**58.54%**	35.98%	5.49%
**Konya**	**74.62%**	22.33%	3.06%
Kütahya	**69.31%**	29.54%	1.15%
**Malatya**	**70.27%**	24.42%	5.31%
**Manisa**	46.13%	**48.27%**	5.60%
**Kahramanmaraş**	**71.48%**	24.22%	4.29%
**Mardin**	36.67%	2.33%	**61.00%**
**Muğla**	32.26%	**63.31%**	4.13%
Muş	35.57%	3.18%	**61.24%**
Nevşehir	**64.42%**	34.18%	1.40%
Niğde	**58.92%**	39.70%	1.38%
**Ordu**	**66.98%**	31.61%	1.41%
Rize	**80.57%**	18.27%	1.16%
**Sakarya**	**69.08%**	28.65%	2.27%

Province	Erdoğan	İhsanoğlu	Demirtaş
**Samsun**	**65.87%**	32.79%	1.34%
Siirt	42.45%	3.47%	**54.09%**
Sinop	**61.19%**	36.99%	1.81%
Sivas	**69.99%**	28.79%	1.22%
**Tekirdağ**	38.22%	**57.37%**	4.41%
Tokat	**62.29%**	36.51%	1.20%
**Trabzon**	**70.08%**	28.74%	1.18%
Tunceli	14.36%	33.39%	**52.25%**
**Şanlıurfa**	**68.60%**	5.16%	26.24%
Uşak	**50.55%**	46.91%	2.54%
**Van**	42.60%	2.85%	**54.55%**
Yozgat	**65.84%**	33.22%	0.95%
Zonguldak	**52.97%**	45.04%	1.99%
Aksaray	**74.00%**	24.54%	1.46%
Bayburt	**80.20%**	19.05%	0.75%
Karaman	**66.22%**	32.13%	1.65%
Kırıkkale	**63.96%**	34.80%	1.24%
Batman	38.02%	1.98%	**60.00%**
Şırnak	14.79%	2.04%	**83.17%**
Bartın	**57.71%**	39.95%	2.35%
Ardahan	**40.69%**	36.23%	23.09%
Iğdır	26.89%	30.17%	**42.94%**
Yalova	**50.20%**	43.95%	5.85%
Karabük	**64.57%**	34.03%	1.39%
Kilis	**64.98%**	31.24%	3.79%
Osmaniye	48.57%	**48.59%**	2.84%
Düzce	**73.57%**	24.60%	1.83%

A summary of the numbers of provinces won by each candidate is shown below.

Candidate	Provinces with pluralities (<50%)	Provinces with majorities (>50%)	Combined	Proportion
Recep Tayyip Erdoğan	3	51	54	66.67%
Ekmeleddin Mehmet İhsanoğlu	4	12	16	19.75%
Selahattin Demirtaş	1	10	11	13.58%
**Total**	**8**	**73**	**81**	**100.00%**

=== Overseas results ===
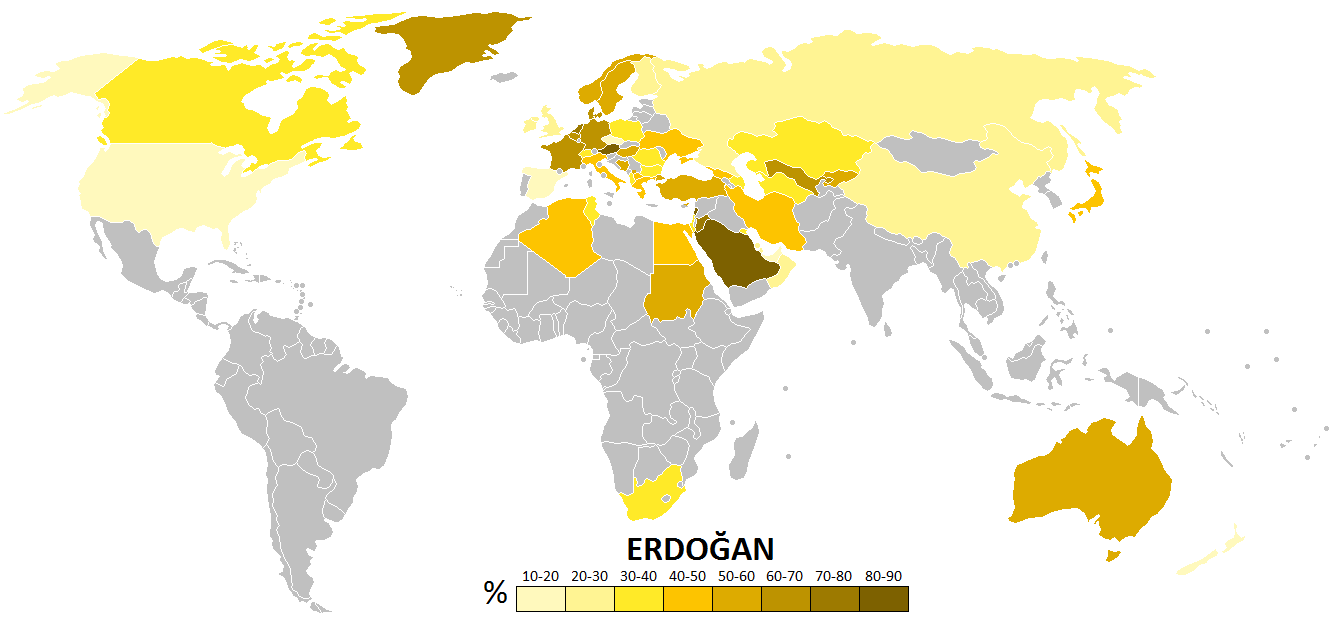
Results obtained by Recep Tayyip Erdoğan by country

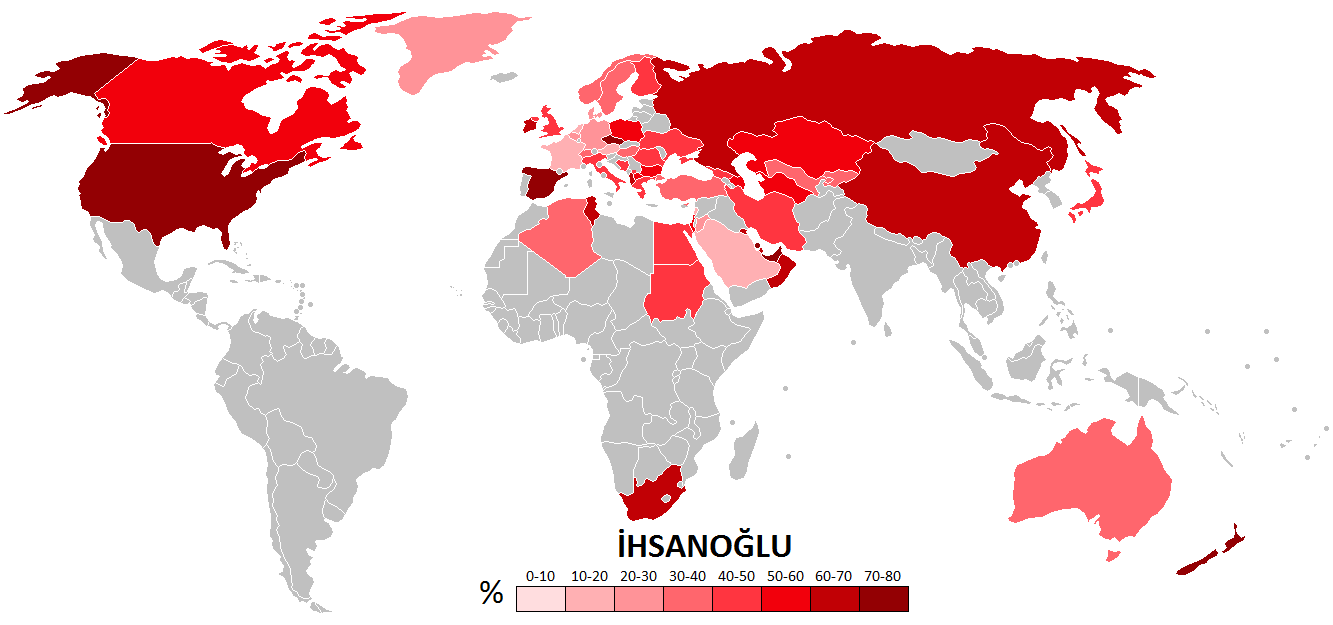
Results obtained by Ekmeleddin İhsanoğlu by country

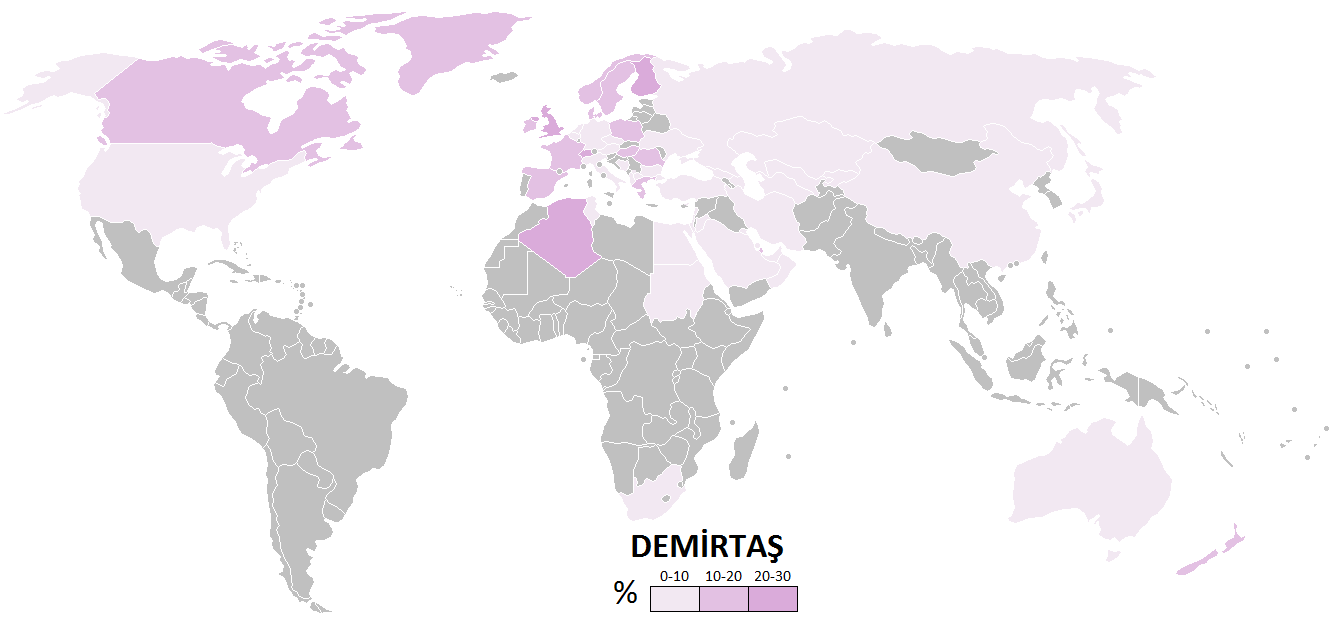
Results obtained by Selahattin Demirtaş by country

Results are listed in alphabetical order. Although Ekmeleddin İhsanoğlu won the most pluralities and majorities, the significantly larger Turkish electorate in countries that heavily voted for Erdoğan resulted in Erdoğan breaking many predictions by receiving nearly two thirds of the overseas vote. In Cairo, the city in which İhsanoğlu was born, 53.73% voted for İhsanoğlu with 44.03% voting for Erdoğan. Regardless, İhsanoğlu won in Egypt by just one vote, due to large support for Erdoğan in Alexandria. Note that in the maps, Greenland is considered part of Denmark, despite the fact that no voting took place in Greenland.

Country	Erdoğan	İhsanoğlu	Demirtaş
Albania	35.81%	**61.49%**	2.70%
Algeria	**42.41%**	37.59%	20.00%
Australia	**56.35%**	34.53%	9.12%
Austria	**80.17%**	14.93%	4.90%
Azerbaijan	39.06%	**53.86%**	7.08%
Bahrain	25.00%	**71.88%**	3.12%
Belgium	**69.85%**	21.07%	9.09%
Bosnia and Herzegovina	**52.59%**	46.67%	0.74%
Bulgaria	35.31%	**58.42%**	6.27%
Canada	33.35%	**51.62%**	15.02%
China	25.27%	**68.86%**	5.86%
Czech Republic	19.88%	**73.49%**	6.63%
Denmark	**62.65%**	27.01%	10.33%
Egypt	48.59%	**49.15%**	2.26%
Finland	28.89%	**43.70%**	27.41%
France	**66.02%**	15.27%	18.71%
Georgia	46.51%	**48.37%**	5.12%
Germany	**68.63%**	23.74%	7.63%

Country	Erdoğan	İhsanoğlu	Demirtaş
Greece	43.95%	**44.44%**	11.60%
Hungary	**52.57%**	35.29%	12.13%
Iran	47.89%	**49.30%**	2.82%
Ireland	24.56%	**64.91%**	10.53%
Israel	31.87%	**58.24%**	9.89%
Italy	**45.82%**	45.22%	8.96%
Japan	46.01%	**47.85%**	6.13%
Jordan	**78.90%**	20.45%	0.65%
Kazakhstan	36.50%	**56.70%**	6.80%
Kosovo	**56.65%**	37.64%	5.70%
Kuwait	31.47%	**66.81%**	1.72%
Kyrgyzstan	**56.65%**	37.64%	5.70%
Lebanon	**85.93%**	14.07%	0.00%
Macedonia	45.08%	**54.10%**	0.82%
Netherlands	**77.95%**	18.09%	3.96%
New Zealand	15.91%	**72.73%**	11.36%
Northern Cyprus	**54.85%**	37.02%	8.12%
Norway	**50.99%**	33.44%	15.56%

Country	Erdoğan	İhsanoğlu	Demirtaş
Oman	29.03%	**69.35%**	1.61%
Poland	32.17%	**50.00%**	17.83%
Qatar	24.51%	**61.76%**	13.73%
Romania	38.27%	**42.65%**	19.08%
Russia	28.74%	**64.10%**	7.16%
Saudi Arabia	**80.55%**	18.38%	1.07%
South Africa	33.33%	**66.06%**	0.61%
Spain	11.00%	**76.98%**	12.03%
Sudan	**53.94%**	44.24%	1.82%
Sweden	**51.11%**	32.64%	16.25%
Switzerland	**39.62%**	31.89%	28.49%
Tunisia	32.14%	**61.90%**	5.95%
Turkmenistan	39.57%	**55.00%**	5.43%
Ukraine	**48.17%**	44.04%	7.80%
United Arab Emirates	18.75%	**75.47%**	5.78%
United Kingdom	23.53%	**49.72%**	26.74%
United States of America	15.91%	**77.88%**	6.21%
Uzbekistan	**65.57%**	32.79%	1.64%

A summary of the numbers of countries won by each candidate is shown below.

Candidate	Countries with pluralities (<50%)	Countries with majorities (>50%)	Combined	Proportion
Recep Tayyip Erdoğan	4	19	23	42.59%
Ekmeleddin Mehmet İhsanoğlu	8	23	31	57.41%
Selahattin Demirtaş	0	0	0	0.00%
**Total**	**12**	**42**	**54**	**100.00%**

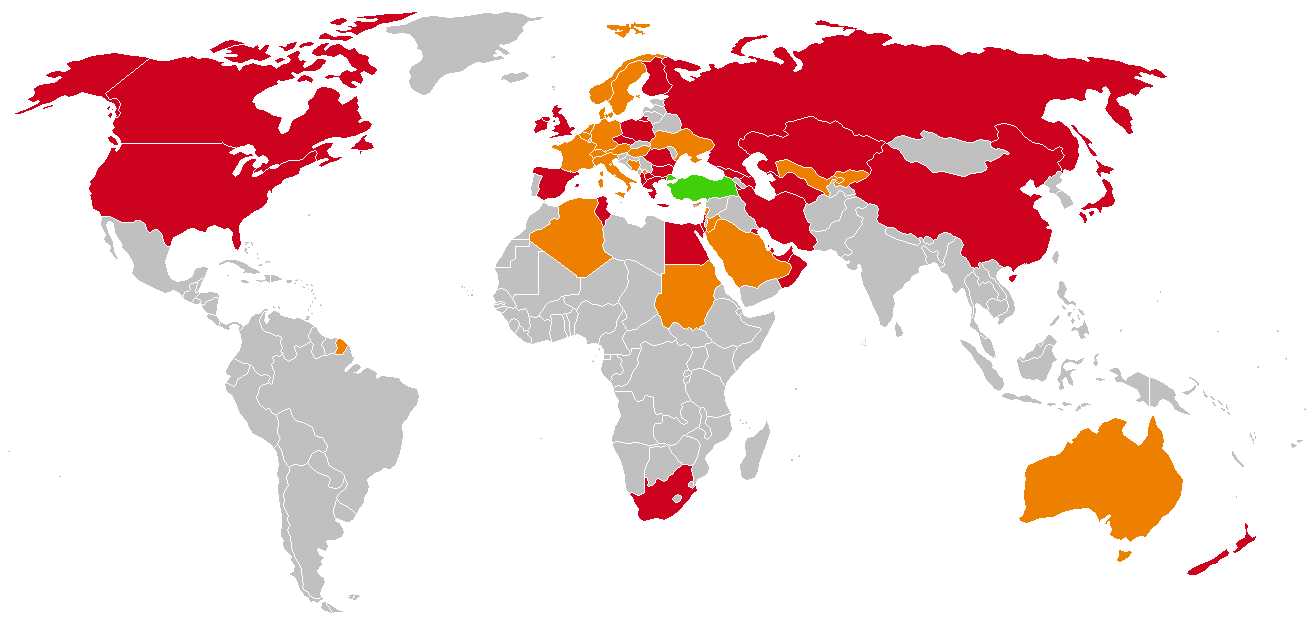
Countries won by Recep Tayyip Erdoğan Countries won by Ekmeleddin İhsanoğlu

== Aftermath ==
Recep Tayyip Erdoğan, by virtue of winning more than half of the vote, was formally inaugurated as the 12th President of Turkey and took over from Abdullah Gül in a handover ceremony on 28 August 2014. The ceremony was boycotted by the opposition CHP. Despite winning more than 50%, the results represented a fall of 400,000 voters for Erdoğan since the 2011 general election. A day before the presidential handover, the AKP held its first extraordinary congress in order to elect a leader to succeed Erdoğan. Previously on 21 August, a 3-hour AKP Central Executive Committee meeting chaired by Erdoğan formally nominated former foreign minister Ahmet Davutoğlu for the party leadership. No other candidate expressed any intention of running, and Davutoğlu was unanimously elected as leader unopposed with 100% of the vote. As he was elected as the leader of a party which commanded a parliamentary majority, Davutoğlu was invited by President Erdoğan to form a government on 28 August. As a consequence, the 62nd government of the Turkish Republic was sworn in by Erdoğan on 29 August, with Davutoğlu leading it as prime minister.

=== Domestic reactions ===
Recep Tayyip Erdoğan made a victory speech on the balcony of the AKP office in Ankara after his victory was confirmed. In his speech, he thanked his supporters for their help during his campaign and stated that the only losers of the election was "dirty politics" and stressed the need to leave hatred and rivalries in the "old Turkey." He further stated that he would be the president of all 77 million citizens of Turkey, and that he would not discriminate or marginalise minorities or political opponents. His speech drew criticism for not containing any mention of Mustafa Kemal Atatürk, the first President of Turkey.

Ekmeleddin İhsanoğlu conceded defeat and congratulated Erdoğan, wishing him well in his new role. He stated that he had won approximately 40% of the vote, which was "by no means" an insignificant amount. He thanked his campaign team and supporters for their help during the campaign.

Selahattin Demirtaş also conceded defeat but did not congratulate Erdoğan, claiming that the election had not been held in a fair manner. He stated that his campaign had reached its goal of obtaining nearly 10% of the vote, which is a threshold for obtaining parliamentary seats in general elections. He stated that he would be filing a formal complaint of results in some areas to the Supreme Electoral Council.

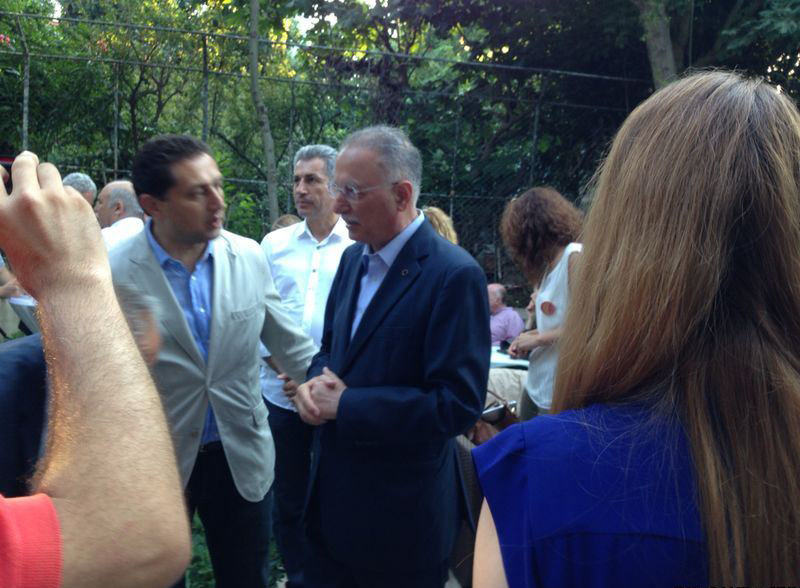
Ekmeleddin İhsanoğlu waiting for the election results to be announced

Former president Süleyman Demirel, outgoing president Abdullah Gül and parliamentary speaker Cemil Çiçek all congratulated Erdoğan on his election victory.

MHP leader Devlet Bahçeli and deputy leader of the CHP Haluk Koç both criticised the lack of fairness during the campaigning period, with Bahçeli blaming "boycotters and holidaymakers" for not voting and guaranteeing Erdoğan's victory in the first round. Regardless, Koç thanked the 12 other political parties that supported İhsanoğlu as well as all the supporters that helped during his campaign.

The election loss for the CHP resulted in many MPs such as Emine Ülker Tarhan, Muharrem İnce and Süheyl Batum losing confidence in the leadership of Kemal Kılıçdaroğlu. İnce resigned as parliamentary group leader in protest, calling for a party convention with a leadership election to be held. The call for a new leadership vote was mainly attributed to Kılıçdaroğlu taking the "risky" decision to support İhsanoğlu without consulting MPs. Despite initially accusing rebellious MPs of not contributing to the election campaign and thus helping Erdoğan win, Kılıçdaroğlu eventually announced that there would be an extraordinary party convention with a leadership election held in September.

=== International reactions ===
==== Countries ====
- Afghanistan – President Hamid Karzai, wished Erdoğan every success in his new role as president and hoped that Turkish-Afghan relations would develop further in his new role.
- Azerbaijan – The president of Azerbaijan Ilham Aliyev hoped that the Turkey would continue to prosper under Erdoğan's new role. He also congratulated Erdoğan by phone.
- Bosnia and Herzegovina – Bakir Izetbegović, the president of Bosnia and Herzegovina congratulated Erdoğan in a written message. Izetbegović said, "Every success to brother Turkey we experience as our own"
- Egypt – The deposed Egyptian president Muhammad Morsi, who was overthrown in a military coup in 2013, congratulated Erdoğan and wished him well in his role as president. The message from Morsi was displayed on the website of his Freedom and Justice Party.
- Georgia – The Georgian prime minister Irakli Garibashvili and President Giorgi Margvelashvili both congratulated Erdoğan on becoming the first directly elected President of Turkey.
- Germany – German chancellor Angela Merkel congratulated Erdoğan in a written message, wishing him success in his new role as president. She also stressed the need to preserve close relations between Germany and Turkey. In a phone call on 14 August, Merkel again congratulated Erdoğan and also discussed regional issues.
- Iran - President Hassan Rouhani congratulated Erdoğan on his victory in Turkey's first presidential election in a telephone conversation. Rouhani also underscored the need for increased cooperation between Tehran and Ankara on Iraq, Syria, and Palestine and said, "The campaign against terrorism in the region, especially in Iraq, requires cooperation between the two countries."
- Jordan – The King of Jordan, Abdullah II congratulated Erdoğan on becoming Turkey's first directly elected president by written message.
- Kosovo – Hashim Thaçi, the Prime Minister of Kosovo congratulated Erdoğan in a written message and hoped that Turkish-Kosovan relations would continue to develop in his new role.
- Kyrgyzstan – The president of Kyrgyzstan, Almazbek Atambayev, attended as a surprise guest speaker at Erdoğan's balcony speech on the eve of the elections, praising his premiership and congratulating him and Turkey on his election as president.
- Lebanon – The Prime Minister of Lebanon Tammam Salam congratulated Erodoğan and hoped to work together in strengthening relations and developing a mutual policy against the latest regional developments. Former Lebanese president Amine Gemayel and former prime minister Saad Hariri also congratulated Erodoğan.
- Mauritania – Mohamed Ould Abdel Aziz, the president of Mauritania, congratulated Erdoğan and wished that his victory would bring both welfare and development to Turkey as well as stronger ties between Mauritania and Turkey.
- Morocco – The King of Morocco, Mohammed VI, congratulated Erdoğan and hoped that the economic development in Turkey would continue under his presidency.
- North Korea – Kim Yong Nam, president of the Presidium of the Supreme People's Assembly of the DPRK, sent a congratulatory message to Erdoğan upon his election as president of Turkey.
- Northern Cyprus – The president of the Turkish Republic of Northern Cyprus, Derviş Eroğlu, wished Erdoğan every success in his new role, hoping that it would contribute to closer relations between Northern Cyprus and the motherland.
- Pakistan – Nawaz Sharif, the prime minister of Pakistan, congratulated Erdoğan by phone and wished him well in his new role.
- Russia – A spokesperson from the Kremlin announced that Russian president Vladimir Putin had phoned and congratulated Erdoğan on becoming the first directly elected president of Turkey.
- Tunisia – The leader of the Tunisian political Ennahda Movement Rashid Al-Ghannushi congratulated Erodoğan via social media. The party's spokesperson Ziyad el-Uzari stated that the victory showed that democracy was a viable option in the Arab Spring. Tunisian president Moncef Marzouki also congratulated Erdoğan by phone.
- Turkmenistan – The president of Turkmenistan, Gurbanguly Berdimuhamedow, congratulated Erdoğan on his success by phone.
- United Kingdom – British prime minister David Cameron phoned Erdoğan and congratulated him on his electoral success.
- United States – U.S. president Barack Obama congratulated Erdoğan by phone, praising him for his victory speech and adding that being the first directly elected president of Turkey was a "historical opportunity." Previously, National Security Council spokesperson Caitlin Hayden stated that President Obama had seen the election results and was prepared to work with Erdoğan and the new prime minister in their new roles.

==== International organizations ====
- European Union – European Commission President José Manuel Barroso and European Council President Herman Van Rompuy congratulated Erdoğan and hoped to pursue closer relations with Turkey. They also stressed the need for a solution to the Cyprus dispute and the need for social reconciliation within Turkey.
- The leader of the International Union of Muslim Scholars, Yusuf al-Qaradawi, congratulated Erdoğan and stated that he had been elected as the "right man for the right job."
