= Cem Boyner =

Turkish businessman (born 1955)

- Born: September 23, 1955 (age 71); Istanbul, Turkey
- Occupation: Businessman
- Spouse(s): Bilgün Sazak; Ümit Boyner
- Children: 4
- Father: Osman Boyner

Cem Boyner (born September 23, 1955) is a Turkish businessman in the textile industry, owner of department stores, and was a short-time politician.

== Early life and education ==
Cem Boyner was born on September 3, 1955, in Istanbul to Osman Boyner, a textile industrialist from Tosya who founded Atlınyıldız and Beymen brands and the Beymen and Boyner department stores, among others. After graduating from Robert College, he studied at Boğaziçi University and earned a Bachelor's degree in Business Administration.

== Career ==
In 1978, he was appointed the chairman of the board of the family-owned textile company Altınyıldız and of the Boyner department stores. Currently, he is the CEO of Boyner Holding.

He served as chairman of Turkish Industrialists' and Businessmen's Association (TÜSİAD), the top business association of Turkey, in the 1989-1990 term. In a recent interview for the Creating Emerging Markets project at the Harvard Business School, he describes how he introduced the Advantage Card, which revolutionized the way retail was being conducted in Turkey.

Cem Boyner got interested in politics in 1990s. He founded a liberal-leaning political party, the New Democracy Movement (Turkish: Yeni Demokrasi Hareketi, YDH), and was elected its leader. The party participated in the 1995 general elections. The YDH was not able to enter the parliament, by gaining only 0.48% of the total votes. In 1996, he quit politics due to the poor outcome at the elections.

== Family life ==
Cem Boyner was previously married to Bilgün Sazak, the daughter of the assassinated politician Gün Sazak. From this marriage, he had three daughters, Emine (b. March 16, 1989), and the twins Elif and Ayşe (b. March 6, 1985). Cem Boyner made his second marriage with Ümit Boyner, with whom he had a son, Murat (b. February 14, 1996).

== Hobbies ==
After leaving politics, Cem Boyner developed an interest in underwater photography. He exhibited his photographs taken under water while touring around the world. He collected his safari photographs, taken in Africa and exhibited in 2005, in a book titled Yakındaki Uzak Uzaktaki Yakın (The Near Distant / The Distant Near).

He is also an amateur kickboxing practitioner.

== Books ==
- Demokrasinin İçyüzü (1975)
- Yakındaki Uzak Uzaktaki Yakın
