= Turkish Industry and Business Association =

Turkey's top business organization

- Türk Sanayicileri ve İş İnsanları Derneği
- Abbreviation: TÜSİAD
- Formation: May 20, 1971; 55 years ago
- Legal status: Association
- Location: Istanbul, Turkey
- Secretary General: Ebru Dicle
- President: Ozan Diren
- Affiliations: BIAC; BusinessEurope
- Website: https://www.tusiad.org

TÜSİAD, the Turkish Industry and Business Association (Turkish: Türk Sanayicileri ve İş İnsanları Derneği), is Turkey's top business organization. TÜSİAD represents more than 4,000 member companies, which represent half of Turkey's value-added, 80% of Turkey’s total foreign trade volume, more than 50% of private sector employment, and 80% of corporate tax revenue.

Founded in 1971, TÜSİAD is a voluntary, independent, non-governmental organization dedicated to promoting public welfare through private enterprise. TÜSİAD promotes principles of participatory democracy, a competitive market economy, environmental sustainability, and universal freedoms and human rights. The Association supports independent research and policy discussions on important social and economic issues in Turkey and abroad. TÜSİAD is composed of CEOs and executives from major industrial and service companies in Turkey, including Fortune 500 companies. The current Chairman is Ozan Diren and the Secretary-General is Ebru Dicle.

== Structure ==
TÜSİAD headquarters are in Istanbul, and there are seven representative offices: Ankara, Brussels, Washington, D.C., Paris, Berlin, Beijing, and London.

TÜSİAD's activities are structured around round tables led by members of the board of directors and 36 working groups.

TÜSİAD partners with the Brookings Institution, the German Marshall Fund of the United States, and the St. Petersburg International Economic Forum (SPIEF).

TÜSİAD is a member of the Business and Industry Advisory Committee to the OECD (BIAC), Global Business Coalition, and BusinessEurope.

== Political context ==
TÜSİAD is recognized as Turkey's secular, pro-Westernization business organization, while MÜSİAD caters to conservative Muslim entrepreneurs. In the early 2000s, TÜSİAD coordinated heavily with the newly elected AKP majority, with the shared aim of joining the European Union. TÜSİAD is also credited with laying the groundwork for Turkish support for the Annan Plan on Cyprus. However, as the EU accession process began to deteriorate in 2006, then-Prime Minister Recep Tayyip Erdoğan's administration reversed course away from the EU, driving a wedge between the two. Since then, TÜSİAD has embarked on a project of public diplomacy, opening representative offices in European capitals and Washington, D.C. to engage and collaborate with relevant actors in the private sector and the general public.

In June 2016, TÜSİAD released a statement criticizing a proposed law which would enhance the government’s authority to appoint boards of trustees for companies. The controversial article was later removed from the law.

Turkish President Recep Tayyip Erdoğan has criticized TÜSİAD on multiple occasions. In April 2015, Erdoğan was critical of comments made about the Turkish economy. In December 2014, Erdoğan criticized the organization for apparently sidestepping his office after then TÜSİAD President Haluk Dinçer explained the organization works with the prime minister and ministers whose business is related to the organization’s efforts, not the president.

Though occasionally at odds politically with the ruling AKP, they are a united front on economic matters; immediately following the July 15, 2016 coup attempt, TÜSİAD took out ads in major world newspapers and held high-level meetings with American and European think tanks, NGOs, and government officials in tandem with Turkish government officials in order to brandish Turkey's image abroad and reassure investors of Turkey's economic and political health.

== Presidents ==
- 1971–1979 Feyyaz Berker
- 1980–1984 Ali Koçman
- 1985 Şahap Kocatopçu
- 1986 Sakıp Sabancı
- 1987–1988 Ömer Dinçkök
- 1989–1990 Cem Boyner
- 1991–1992 Bülent Eczacıbaşı
- 1993–1996 Halis Komili
- 1997–1998 Muharrem Kayhan
- 1999–2000 Erkut Yücaoğlu
- 2001–2003 Tuncay Özilhan
- 2004–2006 Ömer Sabancı
- 2007–2009 Arzuhan Doğan Yalçındağ
- 2010–2013 Ümit Nazlı Boyner
- 2013–2014 Muharrem Yılmaz
- 2014–2015 Haluk Dinçer
- 2015–2017 Cansen Başaran–Symes
- 2017–2019 Erol Bilecik
- 2019–2022 Simone Kaslowski
- 2022–2026 Orhan Turan
- 2026–present Ozan Diren
