= Ümit Boyner =

Turkish businesswoman (born 1963)

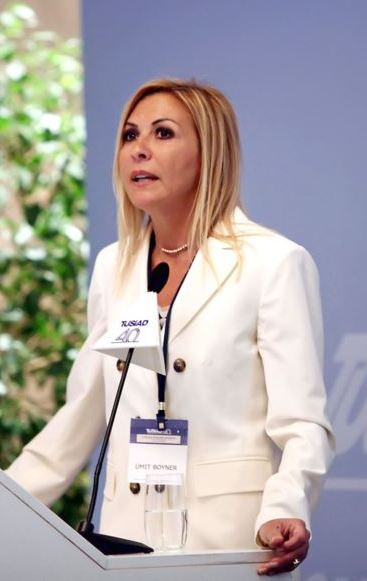
- Ümit Nazlı Boyner in 2012

14th President of the Turkish Industry and Business Association
- In office 21 January 2010 – 17 January 2013
- Preceded by: Arzuhan Doğan Yalçındağ
- Succeeded by: Muharrem Yılmaz

Personal details
- Born: Ümit Nazlı Alpay; September 28, 1963 (age 62) Istanbul, Turkey
- Spouse(s): Doğan Bolak; Cem Boyner
- Children: 2
- Education: University of Rochester

Ümit Nazlı Boyner (née Alpay; born 28 September 1963) is a Turkish businesswoman who served as the 14th President of the Turkish Industry and Business Association (TÜSİAD) from 2010 to 2013.

She is one of the co-founders of the Women Entrepreneurs Association of Turkey.
