= Opinion polling for the 2023 Turkish presidential election =

Opinion polling in 2023

In the run up to the 2023 Turkish presidential election, with its first round held on 14 May and a second round on 28 May, various organisations carried out opinion polling to gauge voting intention in Turkey. Results of such polls are displayed in this article. These polls only include Turkish voters nationwide and do not take into account Turkish expatriates voting abroad. The date range for these opinion polls are from the previous general election, held on 24 June 2018, to the present day.

Poll results are listed in the tables below in reverse chronological order, showing the most recent first, and using the date the survey's fieldwork was done, as opposed to the date of publication. If such date is unknown, the date of publication is given instead. The highest percentage figure in each polling survey is displayed in bold, and the background shaded in the leading party's color. In the instance that there is a tie, or that no candidate exceeds 50%, top two candidates' figures are shaded. The lead column on the right shows the percentage-point difference between the two parties with the highest figures. When a specific poll does not show a data figure for a party, the party's cell corresponding to that poll is shown empty.

== First round ==
=== Polling aggregations ===
Light red denotes reports that were released after the polling ban came into effect.

Aggregator/ Pollsters	Fieldwork dates	Last updated	Erdoğan PEOPLE	Kılıçdaroğlu NATION	Oğan ANCESTRAL	İnce HOMELAND	Others/ Undecided	Lead
600vekil	April–May	13 May	47.0%	**49.3%**	3.7%	–	–	2.3%
Euronews	25 April – 12 May	12 May	45.8%	**48.9%**	3.0%	2.3%	–	3.1%
POLITICO	April–May	12 May	46%	**50%**	3%	2%	'-1%'	4%
TGRT Haber	May	4 May	**47.5%**	46.13%	2.83%	3.53%	–	1.37%
Piyasal Siyasal	April–May	4 May	45.67%	**47.32%**	2.53%	4.48%	–	1.65%
Anketler ve Raporlar	April	4 May	45.2%	**46.9%**	2.3%	5.5%	0.1%	1.7%
Europe Elects / Euractiv	April–May	3 May	44%	**48%**	3%	5%	–	4%
Polimetre	April–May	2 May	35.3%	**55.5%**	–	–	9.2%	20.2%
Türkiye Raporu	April	2 May	44.22%	**47.64%**	2.78%	5.37%	–	3.42%
PolitPro	April	1 May	43.3%	**48.8%**	2.7%	4.9%	0.3%	5.5%
El Electoral	April	28 April	44.0%	**47.5%**	2.0%	5.5%	1.0%	3.5%
Seçimler ve Sayılar	April	25 April	45.24%	**46.95%**	2.16%	5.65%	–	1.71%
ThePoliticalPulse	March	12 March	44.06%	**55.90%**	–	–	0.04%	11.84%

=== Official campaign polling ===

The table below contains polls conducted after the official start of the campaign period on 10 March.

Light red denotes polls that were released after the polling ban came into effect.

Fieldwork date (Note: Publishment date if not possible.)	Polling firm	Published by	Sample size					Lead
Fieldwork date	Polling firm	Published by	Sample size	Erdoğan PEOPLE	Kılıçdaroğlu NATION	Oğan ANCESTRAL	İnce HOMELAND	Lead
14 May 2023	Nationwide results YSK			49.52	44.88	5.17	0.43	4.64
10–13 May	AtlasIntel		4,920	44.5	**44.6**	7.9	1.1	**0.1**
12–13 May	Özdemir		3,016	**48.4**	45.2	6.4	–	**3.2**
11–13 May	Remres		4,764	44.4	**53.6**	1.9	0.1	**9.2**
11–13 May	TAG		2,910	45.1	**52.1**	2.6	0.2	**7.0**
12 May	İEA		1,500	45.6	**50.5**	3.9	–	**4.9**
11–12 May	BETİMAR		5,751	**49.1**	45.0	5.6	0.3	**4.1**
11–12 May	AREDA Survey (Note: Owner is affiliated with and has worked for AKP.)		25,000	**51.3**	44.2	3.9	0.6	**7.1**
11–12 May	ASAL		2,017	**50.6**	46.3	3.1	–	**4.3**
9–12 May	Aksoy		4,000	45.6	**47.9**	5.7	0.8	**2.3**
10–11 May	ORC		3,920	44.2	**51.7**	2.8	1.3	**7.5**
10–11 May	GENAR		2,000	**51.4**	44.3	3.7	–	**7.1**
9–11 May	Optimar		5,950	**50.4**	44.7	3.4	1.5	**5.7**
8–11 May	Avrasya (Note: Owner applied for an MP candidacy for CHP.)		2,460	44.2	**51.3**	3.1	1.4	**7.1**
11 May 2023			Muharrem İnce withdraws his candidacy.					
9–10 May	Yöneylem		2,476	44.4	**49.5**	4.7	1.4	**5.1**
9–10 May	MetroPOLL		2,038	46.9	**49.1**	2.7	1.3	**2.2**
8–10 May	EuroPoll		2,387	46.2	**51.5**	2.3	–	**5.3**
7–10 May	Argetus		2,568	**50.6**	46.1	2.1	1.2	**4.5**
7–10 May	SER-AR		2,795	45.2	**52.1**	2.7	–	**6.9**
5–10 May	ARL		5,243	46.1	**50.3**	2.2	1.4	**4.2**
3–10 May	Remres		5,411	44.1	**52.1**	1.7	2.1	**8.0**
8–9 May	Area		3,000	46.1	**49.1**	3.5	1.3	**3.0**
6–9 May	İEA		5,000	45.9	**48.7**	3.7	1.7	**2.8**
6–9 May	PİAR		–	45.3	**51.3**	2.6	0.8	**6.0**
5–9 May	ALF		6,000	44.7	**51.2**	2.5	1.6	**6.5**
2–9 May	Artıbir		1,500	44.6	**50.1**	3.0	2.3	**5.5**
20 Apr–9 May	ADA		65,000	**50.6**	44.8	1.7	2.9	**5.8**
4–8 May	İVEM		4,020	**48.6**	46.9	2.4	2.1	**1.7**
2–8 May	BULGU		2,400	43.2	**50.5**	3.8	2.5	**7.3**
6–7 May	KONDA		3,480	43.7	**49.3**	4.8	2.2	**5.6**
3–7 May	SAROS		8,164	46.09	**51.00**	2.91	–	**5.0**
3–7 May	SAROS		8,164	44.5	**49.96**	2.3	3.2	**5.5**
2–6 May	TAG		3,150	44.7	**50.2**	2.3	2.8	**5.5**
27 Apr–5 May	Avrasya		5,600	43.6	**50.9**	3.0	2.5	**7.3**
26 Apr–4 May	MAK		5,750	45.4	**50.9**	2.0	1.7	**5.5**
1–3 May	AtlasIntel		2,006	**44.8**	44.1	5.8	5.3	**0.7**
1-3 May	AREDA Survey		16,740	**50.8**	41.9	3.6	3.7	**8.9**
27 Apr-3 May	AR-G		2,231	46.4	**49.1**	2.2	2.3	**2.7**
26 Apr–3 May	Özdemir		5,916	**49.2**	43.3	4.7	2.9	**5.9**
30 Apr-2 May	SER-AR		2,600	44.3	**52.7**	1.6	1.4	**8.4**
28 Apr-2 May	İVEM		4,156	**47.8**	45.9	3.0	3.3	**1.9**
27 Apr-2 May	SONAR		4,197	**48.8**	44.1	3.5	3.6	**4.7**
27 Apr-2 May	ASAL		2,523	**49.1**	46.3	1.9	2.7	**2.8**
25 Apr-2 May	HBS		5,100	**47.5**	47.0	2.2	3.3	**0.5**
29 Apr-1 May	ORC		3,950	44.6	**48.0**	3.1	4.3	**3.4**
27-30 Apr	Yöneylem		2,594	42.5	**48.6**	5.2	3.7	**6.1**
25-30 Apr	TAG		1,900	43.3	**51.9**	2.3	2.7	**8.6**
25-30 Apr	SAROS		7,284	47.2	**49.1**	1.3	2.3	**1.9**
26-29 Apr	ADA		3,278	**48.9**	45.8	2.4	2.9	**3.1**
26-28 Apr	Aksoy		1,537	41.9	**47.3**	5.0	5.8	**5.4**
24-28 Apr	Sosyo Politik		1,569	44.1	**51.7**	1.2	3.0	**7.6**
25-28 Apr	Optimar		3,005	**48.6**	44.1	3.0	4.3	**4.5**
25-27 Apr	AREDA Survey		14,193	**51.1**	42.0	2.8	4.1	**9.1**
24-27 Apr	SER-AR		5,000	44.8	**53.1**	0.5	1.6	**8.3**
24-26 Apr	Gezici		3,991	44.6	**48.7**	2.0	4.7	**5.4**
23-26 Apr	TEAM		3,054	44.4	**47.4**	2.1	6.1	**3.0**
17-25 Apr	TÜSİAR		1,500	**48.7**	46.6	1.1	3.6	**2.1**
10-25 Apr	BULGU	Sözcü	2,400	41.5	**49.5**	2.5	6.5	**8.0**
13-24 Apr	Artıbir		1,500	43.7	**49.4**	2.4	4.5	**5.7**
19-22 Apr	ORC		3,920	42.4	**49.3**	2.2	6.1	**6.9**
15-20 Apr	AREDA Survey		17,400	**51.4**	41.8	2.2	4.6	**9.6**
15-18 Apr	Piar		5,400	47.1	**49.4**	2.3	1.2	**2.3**
12-20 Apr	Area		10,277	46.7	**46.8**	2.6	3.9	**0.1**
14-16 Apr	Yöneylem		2,422	43.0	**48.6**	2.8	5.8	**5.6**
10-16 Apr	SONAR		4,541	**46.1**	44.1	2.1	7.7	**2.0**
10-16 Apr	AKSOY		1,067	38.4	**47.9**	4.8	9.0	**9.5**
10-16 Apr	MAK		5,750	43.7	**47.8**	1.1	3.4	**4.1**
12-14 Apr	AREDA Survey		10,136	**50.8**	43.1	1.6	4.5	**7.7**
13 Apr	AR-G		1,984	45.6	**49.2**	1.3	3.9	**3.6**
8-12 Apr	ALF		2,340	43.9	**47.4**	2.2	6.5	**3.5**
7-11 Apr	ORC		5,400	41.5	**48.9**	2.4	7.2	**7.4**
6-10 Apr	Avrasya		2,410	42.3	**50.9**	2.0	4.8	**8.6**
9 Apr	SAROS		10,729	**46.8**	45.7	1.6	6.0	1.1
3-8 Apr	TAG		1,600	42.9	**51.4**	1.6	4.1	**8.5**
1-8 Apr	Optimar	Milliyet	4,745	**45.9**	43.9	1.7	8.3	2.0
1-4 Apr	TekAr		3,600	45.8	**46.2**	2.4	5.6	**0.4**
1-3 Apr	MetroPoll		2,610	41.1	**42.6**	2.2	5.0	**1.5**
1-2 Apr	Gezici		2.864	43.2	**53.4**	1.3	2.1	**10.2**
25 Mar-2 Apr	ASAL		2,147	**46.8**	42.2	2.6	8.4	4.6
28 Mar - 1 Apr	AREDA Survey	Sabah	18,487	**50.6**	41.8	2.1	5.5	**8.8**
31 Mar	MetroPoll	BirGün	2,046	42.0	**44.6**	–	–	**2.6**
31 March 2023			Final candidate list was published in the Official Gazette.					
28-30 Mar	Ankara Analitik		2,187	**44.5**	39.7	1.5	14.3	**4.8**
27-29 Mar	Yöneylem		2,655	41.6	**46.4**	2.9	9.1	**4.8**
24 March 2023			Erbakan withdraws his candidacy, endorsing Erdoğan.					
22 March 2023			Labour and Freedom Alliance announces that they are not nominating a candidate.					
13-21 Mar	Artıbir	KRT TV Live	1,500	44.0	**51.3**	1.2	3.5	**7.3**
20 Mar	SAROS		10,826	44.3	**45.5**	–	3.1	**1.2**
13-18 Mar	Optimar		1,916	**47.4**	45.3	0.7	6.5	2.1
12-17 Mar	Avrasya	23 DERECE	2,560	39.7	**53.5**	1.4	2.9	**13.8**
13-15 Mar	TAG		2,100	43.2	**45.4**	3.6	5.5	**2.2**
11-15 Mar	ORC		4,540	42.3	**53.1**	1.5	3.1	**7.8**
17 Mar	Themis	Haber3	1,458	32.1	**36.8**	12.2	7.9	**4.7**
15 Mar	MAK	Habertürk TV	5,750	45.7	**51.1**	–	–	**5.4**
14 Mar	AR-G		1,472	43.1	**46.2**	3.1	7.6	**3.1**

=== Pre-campaign polling ===
==== 2023 ====
Fieldwork date	Polling firm	Published by	Sample size											Others	Lead
Fieldwork date	Polling firm	Published by	Sample size	Erdoğan AKP	İmamoğlu CHP	Yavaş CHP	Kılıçdaroğlu CHP	Demirtaş HDP	Akşener İYİ	Karamollaoğlu SAADET	Babacan DEVA	Davutoğlu GP	İnce MP	Others	Lead
6 March 2023				Kılıçdaroğlu is declared the Nation Alliance candidate for president.											
23–27 Feb	Areda	Yeni Şafak	3,000	**49.8**	6.9	9.6	21.7	6.0	2.6	0.4	0.8	0.2	0.8	1.2	28.1

==== 2022 ====
Fieldwork date	Polling firm	Published by	Sample size														Others	Lead
Fieldwork date	Polling firm	Published by	Sample size	Erdoğan AKP	İmamoğlu CHP	Yavaş CHP	Kılıçdaroğlu CHP	Demirtaş HDP	Beştaş HDP	Buldan HDP	Akşener İYİ	Karamollaoğlu SAADET	Bahçeli MHP	Babacan DEVA	Davutoğlu GP	İnce MP	Others	Lead
12–15 Aug	Optimar	Hürriyet	2,000	**36.5**	3.7	14.7	14.6	9.5	–	–	7.6	–	8.3	–	–	–	5.1	21.8
11–14 Jul	Optimar	Hürriyet	3,481	**30.1**	4.6	12.5	11	8.2	–	–	6.4	–	–	–	–	–	–	17.6
13–24 Jun	SONAR		3.100	**40.2**	10.1	17.8	4.3	4.6	–	–	10.4	–	2.2	1.7	–	2.1	6.6	22.4
12–15 May	Optimar	T24	2.519	**36.1**	8.4	11.9	11.9	4.7	–	–	3.2	–	–	–	–	–	–	24.2
6–12 May	SONAR		2.840	**39.2**	12.5	15.7	3.9	4.7	8.0	2.8	1.9	–	–	2.7	8.6	–	–	23,5
23–28 Apr	Optimar	Gazete Duvar	1.847	**33.1**	9.1	13.0	12.0	–	–	–	–	–	–	–	–	–	–	20,1
Apr	MetroPOLL		–	**40.1**	–	–	30.2	15.2	–	–	–	–	–	–	–	–	–	9,9
Apr	ALF		–	**33.7**	16.6	22.2	4.3	8.3	7.2	–	–	–	–	2.1	5.6	–	–	11,5
10–16 Mar	Optimar	Hürriyet	2.002	**33.8**	10.7	9.9	11.5	–	–	–	–	–	–	–	–	–	–	22.3
24–31 Jan	AKAM	Europe Elects	1.860	28.5	–	–	**30.3**	10.2	–	–	11.0	4.9	7.9	2.4	–	2.7	–	1.8
7–13 Jan	İEA	Europe Elects	1.500	**44.0**	–	–	–	15.2	–	–	40.8	–	–	–	–	–	–	2.2

==== 2021 ====
Fieldwork date	Polling firm	Published by	Sample size														Others	Lead
Fieldwork date	Polling firm	Published by	Sample size	Erdoğan AKP	İmamoğlu CHP	Yavaş CHP	Kılıçdaroğlu CHP	Demirtaş HDP	Beştaş HDP	Buldan HDP	Akşener İYİ	Karamollaoğlu SAADET	Bahçeli MHP	Babacan DEVA	Davutoğlu GP	İnce MP	Others	Lead
30 Nov–5 Dec	Yöneylem	T24	2,002	43.5	–	–	40.8	15.8	–	–	–	–	–	–	–	–	–	2.7
13–20 Nov	Optimar	Hürriyet	2,507	26.0	8.5	14.2	5.0	8.7	–	–	6.4	–	4.3	–	–	–	–	11.8
11–14 Nov	ASAL		1,712	43.3	11.3	10.6	6.0	10.1	–	–	7.7	–	3.7	2.4	0.7	1.5	2.7	32.0
27 Oct–3 Nov	Yöneylem	Europe Elects	2,000	44.8	–	–	40.0	15.2	–	–	–	–	–	–	–	–	–	4.8
Oct	ADA		2,423	38.8	–	–	19.0	–	–	6.1	17.1	1.0	7.8	2.7	1.4	2.4	3.7	19.8
Oct	SAROS		1,854	43.4	12.1	11.4	6.1	11.0	–	–	8.0	–	3.6	3.0	0.5	0.7	0.2	31.3
24–30 Sep	Yöneylem	Gazete Duvar	2,400	47.8	–	–	36.3	15.9	–	–	–	–	–	–	–	–	–	11.5
19–27 Sep	Optimar		1,938	45.6	8.1	15.8	10.1	9.1	–	–	9.4	–	0.5	0.3	0.1	–	1.2	29.8
10–22 Sep	Sosyo Politik		2,000	48.2	7.6	5.8	19.0	8.4	–	–	6.8	–	–	2.1	1.4	0.7	–	29.2
20–27 Aug	Yöneylem	Gazete Duvar	3,040	45.9	–	–	38.2	15.9	–	–	–	–	–	–	–	–	–	7.7
Aug	Optimar	Para Analiz	N/A	46.3	8.2	18.5	7.3	6.3	–	–	5.3	0.1	3.2	1.6	0.1	0.9	2.1	27.8
10–13 Jul	Optimar	Hür Haber	1,726	45.1	8.9	15.9	8.3	5.9	–	–	6.4	0.5	4.1	0.9	0.3	0.4	3.3	29.2
21–28 Jun	Sosyo Politik		1,008	37.5	14.2	7.6	18.3	9.8	–	–	8.4	–	–	3.1	–	1.1	–	19.2
22–24 May	Optimar	Hürriyet	1,836	36.7	7.7	13.8	6.5	8.2	–	–	8.0	–	–	–	–	–	–	22.9
22–30 Apr	Optimar	Hürriyet	2,027	38.6	9.6	15.7	4.1	–	–	–	6.0	–	–	–	–	–	–	22.9
Mar	SAROS		3,042	38.6	14.6	2.9	3.9	13.2	–	–	9.7	–	11.3	1.9	1.8	1.4	0.7	24.0
28 Feb – 5 Mar	Optimar	Milliyet	2,207	32.5	6.2	8.0	1.6	–	–	–	5.2	–	–	–	–	4.2	–	24.5
10 Jan – 4 Feb	SONAR		3,200	45.9	14.6	9.8	2.3	5.2	–	–	8.8	–	7.1	–	–	–	6.3	31.3
20–26 Jan	ADA		3,245	48.2	–	–	12.6	7.4	–	–	13.7	1.0	–	4.0	2.4	3.3	7.3	34.5
Jan	SAROS		3,034	37.6	9.6	3.8	7.3	17.1	–	–	9.3	0.9	10.0	1.5	1.6	1.2	0.2	20.5

==== 2020 ====
Fieldwork date	Polling firm	Sample size													Others	Lead
Fieldwork date	Polling firm	Sample size	Erdoğan AKP	İmamoğlu CHP	Yavaş CHP	Kılıçdaroğlu CHP	Demirtaş HDP	Beştaş HDP	Akşener İYİ	Karamollaoğlu SAADET	Bahçeli MHP	Babacan DEVA	Davutoğlu GP	İnce MP	Others	Lead
Dec	TEAM	9,281	43.2	16.2	6.2	2.8	9.6	–	8.3	–	4.8	1.6	1.0	3.9	2.4	27.0
Dec	Sandık Analiz	3,809	44.0	31.2	–	–	–	7.5	10.6	0.6	–	4.1	1.1	–	0.9	12.8
3–9 Dec	Optimar	2,253	33.8	4.7	6.6	4.5	–	–	5.1	–	–	–	–	–	–	27.2
11 Nov – 4 Dec	Kadir Has University	1,000	47.8	9.6	6.1	10.8	11.1	–	10.3	–	–	–	–	–	4.3	36.7
Nov	SAROS	3,092	34.1	13.1	4.1	7.0	12.2	–	7.5	–	10.3	9.9	0.7	0.6	0.6	21.0
26–30 Oct	Optimar	2,147	36.4	8.3	8.6	–	–	–	–	–	–	–	–	–	–	27.8
Aug	SONAR	2,850	50.5	11.1	7.7	–	7.8	–	8.8	–	–	–	–	8.3	5.8	39.4
3–5 Aug	ADA	1,750	43.2	13.8	14.3	1.2	5.7	–	6.8	0.9	4.2	3.4	1.7	3.7	1.1	28.9
10–14 Jul	Optimar	2,047	38.4	7.0	4.0	–	4.7	–	5.6	–	–	–	–	–	–	31.4
Jun	SAROS	3,017	41.4	15.0	4.7	9.9	9.2	–	8.8	0.2	8.1	0.7	1.4	–	0.6	26.4
May	AR–G	1,258	42.1	19.6	12.8	1.0	5.6	–	6.1	0.9	3.2	4.1	1.8	2.2	0.6	22.5
20 Apr – 8 May	Optimar	2,307	48.2	13.5	7.3	–	8.5	–	–	–	–	–	–	–	–	34.7
9 Mar - 2 Apr	Konsensus	1,500	49.9	17.7	5.6	–	6.8	–	5.5	–	–	–	–	–	–	32.2
2–6 Mar	ADA	1,366	44.3	25.5	2.9	1.3	6.6	–	6.2	1.3	4.9	3.2	1.3	1.4	1.1	18.8
24 Feb	Polimetre (Note: Poll didn't present candidate names for AKP, CHP, HDP, İYİ; but presented parties.)	N/A	38.5	35.1			9.3	–	8.1	–	–	–	–	–	9.0	3.4
2–9 Jan	Artibir	1,500	49.5	37.7	–	–	9.4	–	–	–	–	–	–	–	3.4	11.8

==== 2018–2019 ====
Fieldwork date	Polling firm	Sample size												Others	Lead
Fieldwork date	Polling firm	Sample size	Erdoğan AKP	İmamoğlu CHP	Yavaş CHP	Kılıçdaroğlu CHP	Demirtaş HDP	Akşener İYİ	Karamollaoğlu SAADET	Bahçeli MHP	Babacan DEVA	Davutoğlu GP	İnce MP	Others	Lead
13–15 Dec	Public Status	4,150	**53.0**	27.7	–	–	8.5	6.8	1.1	–	0.9	0.2	1.2	1.0	25.3
21−28 Oct	ADA	1,700	**45.1**	26.6	–	1.1	4.2	6.1	1.4	5.3	3.8	2.1	1.6	2.8	18.1
19–30 Aug	ADA	1,721	**39.1**	28.6	–	0.5	8.0	6.8	–	6.5	4.2	2.3	2.0	2.0	10.5
2–7 Aug	SAROS	3,012	**45.0**	19.2	–	–	15.3	12.8	–	–	0.7	–	4.9	2.1	25.8
2019
Jul	ORC	N/A	**56.7** (Note: With MHP.)	27.7 (Note: With Muharrem İnce as the candidate.)			8.4	6.5	0.5	–	—			0.2	29.0
24 Jun 2018	2018 presidential election	51,188,524	52.6	30.6			8.4	7.3	0.9	N/A	N/A	N/A	N/A	0.2	20.0

== Second round ==
=== Erdoğan vs. Kılıçdaroğlu ===
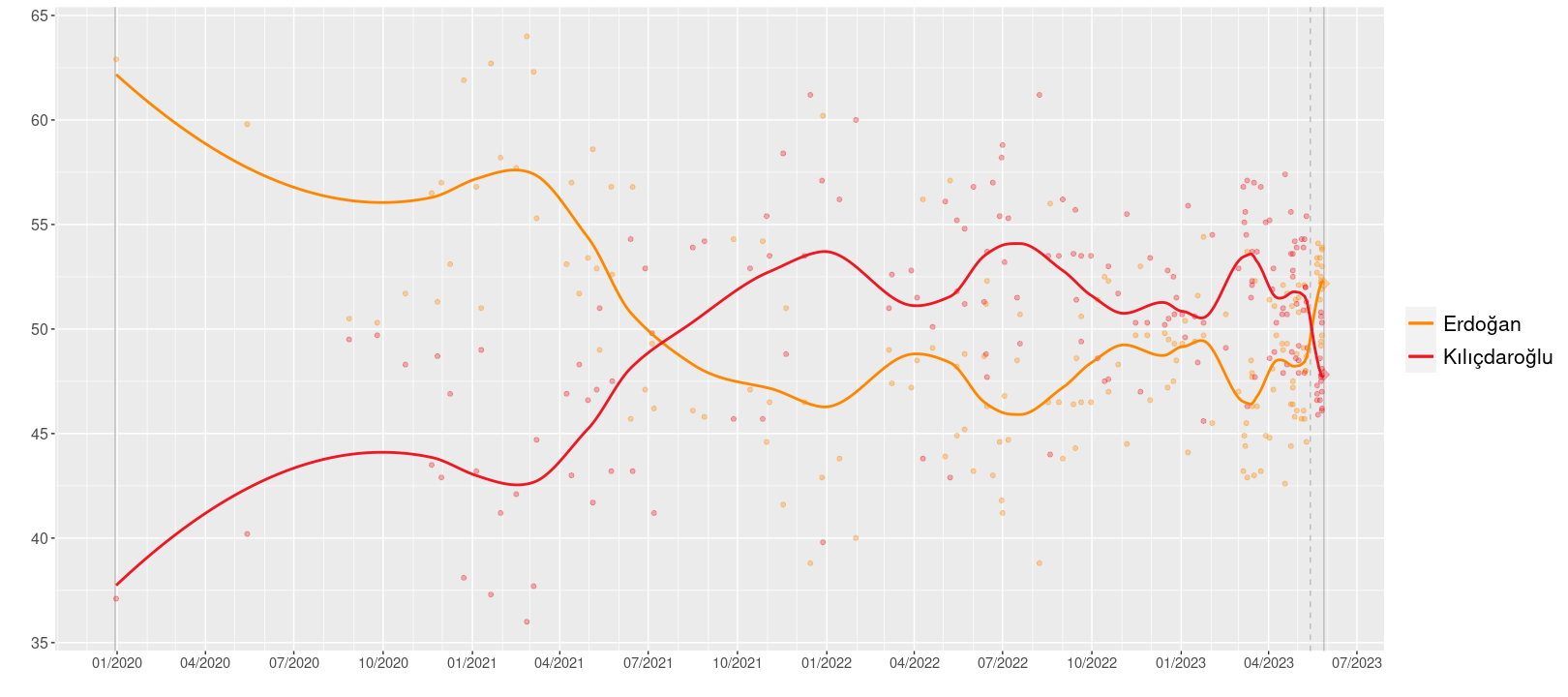

=== Polling aggregations ===
Light red denotes reports that were released after the polling ban came into effect.

Aggregator/ Pollsters	Fieldwork dates	Last updated	Erdoğan PEOPLE	Kılıçdaroğlu NATION	Others/ Undecided	Lead
POLITICO	May	28 May	**51%**	49%	–	**2%**
Anketler ve Raporlar	April	28 May	**52.4%**	47.5%	0.1%	**4.9%**
Türkiye Raporu	April	2 May	47.97%	**52.03%**	–	**4.06%**

=== Official campaign polling ===
The table below contains polls conducted after the official start of the campaign period on 15 May.

Light red denotes polls that were released after the polling ban came into effect.

Fieldwork date	Polling firm	Sample size			Lead
Fieldwork date	Polling firm	Sample size	Erdoğan PEOPLE	Kılıçdaroğlu NATION	Lead
25–26 May	İEA	–	**51.9**	48.1	3.8
25–26 May	BETİMAR	6,601	**52.2**	47.8	4.4
25–26 May	Özdemir	3,250	**53.94**	46.06	7.88
25–26 May	ALF	2,500	49.7	**50.3**	0.6
25–26 May	SER-AR	2,200	48.7	**51.3**	2.6
24–25 May	ORC	3,950	49.2	**50.8**	1.6
24–25 May	Area	2,026	49.4	**50.6**	1.2
18–22 May	Özdemir	5,916	**54.1**	45.9	8.2
20–21 May	KONDA	3,607	**52.7**	47.3	5.4
20–21 May	Areda	10,491	**52.4**	47.6	4.8
13–15 May	TAG	2,350	**51.6**	48.4	3.2

=== Pre-campaign polling ===
==== 2023 ====
Fieldwork date	Polling firm	Sample size			Undecided	Lead
Fieldwork date	Polling firm	Sample size	Erdoğan PEOPLE	Kılıçdaroğlu NATION	Undecided	Lead
9-10 May	MetroPOLL	2,038	48.7	**51.3**	–	3.1
8-9 May	Area	3,000	48.0	**52.0**	–	4.0
4-8 May	İVEM	4.020	**52.1**	47.9	–	4.2
2-8 May	BULGU	2,400	45.7	**54.3**	–	8.6
3-7 May	SAROS	8,164	46.1	**53.9**	–	7.8
2-6 May	TAG	3,150	45.2	**54.8**	–	9.6
4 May 2023		**Opinion polling ban comes into effect 10 days before the first round.**				
1–3 May	AtlasIntel	2,006	**48.5**	45.1	6.4	3.5
27 Apr-3 May	AR-G	2,231	49.2	**50.8**	–	1.6
27 Apr-2 May	SONAR	2,523	**52.1**	47.9	–	4.2
27 Apr-2 May	ASAL	2,523	**50.8**	49.2	–	1.6
25-30 Apr	SAROS	7,284	48.8	**51.2**	–	2.4
26-29 Apr	ADA	3,278	**51.1**	48.9	–	2.2
26-28 Apr	Aksoy	1,537	45.8	**54.2**	–	8.4
25-28 Apr	Optimar	3,005	**51.4**	48.6	–	2.8
25-27 Apr	AREDA	14,193	**53.3**	46.7	–	6.6
24-26 Apr	Gezici	3,991	47.2	**52.8**	–	5.6
23-26 Apr	TEAM	3,054	47.5	**52.5**	–	5.0
17-25 Apr	TÜSİAR	972	**51.1**	48.9	–	2.2
18-24 Apr	Al-Monitor/Premise	972	**45.2**	44.9	9.9	0.3
10-25 Apr	BULGU	2,400	44.3	**55.7**	–	11.4
13-24 Apr	Artıbir	1,500	46.4	**53.6**	–	7.2
12-20 Apr	Area	10,277	49.3	**50.7**	–	1.4
15-21 Apr	TAG	1,850	44.8	**51.6**	3.6	6.8
15-20 Apr	Areda	17,400	**53.5**	46.5	–	7.0
Apr	Genar	–	**51.7**	48.3	–	3.4
10-16 Apr	SONAR	4,541	**52.1**	47.9	–	4.2
10-16 Apr	Aksoy	1,067	42.6	**57.4**	–	14.8
5-15 Apr	HBS	5,100	49.3	**50.7**	–	1.4
1-7 Apr	Optimar	4,745	**51.1**	48.9	–	2.2
Apr	Saros	10,729	49.7	**50.3**	–	0.6
1-2 Apr	Gezici	2,864	44.8	**55.2**	–	10.4
25 Mar-2 Apr	ASAL	2,147	**51.4**	48.6	–	2.8
28 Mar-1 Apr	Areda Survey	18,478	**52.8**	47.2	–	5.6
27-29 Mar	Yöneylem	2,655	44.9	**55.1**	–	10.2
22-27 Mar	Aksoy	1,537	43.2	**56.8**	–	13.6
12-17 Mar	Avrasya	2,560	43.0	**57.0**	–	14.0
11-15 Mar	Bulgu Araştırma	1,800	38.6	**42.4**	19.0	3.8
11-14 Mar	MetroPOLL	1,999	42.0	**44.6**	13.4	2.6
8-15 Mar	MAK	5,750	42.4	**46.5**	11.1	4.1
7-10 Mar	ADA	3,121	**53.7**	46.3	–	7.4
6-9 Mar	İEA	2,000	39.6	**47.0**	13.4	7.4
8 Mar	Aksoy	1,537	44.4	**55.6**	–	11.2
6-7 Mar	ALF	1,770	44.9	**55.1**	–	10.2
6 March 2023	Kılıçdaroğlu is declared the Nation Alliance candidate for president.					
4-6 Mar	ORC	1,850	43.2	**56.8**	–	13.6
March	Aksoy	1,537	43.2	**56.8**	–	13.6
March	SAROS	10,826	46.3	**53.7**	–	7.4
March	GENAR	3,000	**46.3**	42.1	11.6	4.2
March	Piar	1,460	42.9	**57.1**	–	14.2
27 Jan–2 Feb	Avrasya	2,460	40.3	**48.2**	11.5	7.9
February	MetroPOLL	2,117	**42.7**	41.4	15.7	1.3
14-24 Jan	ASAL	2,520	**46.9**	39.3	13.8	7.6
13-18 Jan	MetroPOLL	2,022	**45.9**	43.0	11.1	2.9
3-8 Jan	Avrasya	2,612	38.3	**48.5**	13.2	10.2
2-5 Jan	ORC	3,780	**42.5**	41.8	15.7	0.7
23 Dec–2 Jan	Sosyo Politik	1,582	35.8	**36.8**	27.4	1.0
January	Yöneylem	2,400	41.0	**46.2**	12.7	5.2

==== 2022 ====
Fieldwork date	Polling firm	Sample size			Undecided	Lead
Fieldwork date	Polling firm	Sample size	Erdoğan People's	Kılıçdaroğlu Nation	Undecided	Lead
22-27 Dec	Yöneylem	2,400	42.5	**45.2**	12.3	2.7
20-25 Dec	Area	2,004	37.6	**38.6**	23.8	1.0
14-24 Dec	Artıbir	1,500	39.4	**43.6**	17.0	4.2
13-18 Dec	MetroPOLL	2,077	40.1	**44.9**	15.0	4.8
3 Nov–12 Dec	Global & Akademetre	1,000	**44.0**	34.3	21.7	9.7
29 Nov–3 Dec	Avrasya	2,612	37.5	**48.2**	14.3	10.7
December	SAROS	11,106	49.7	**50.3**	–	0.6
21-30 Nov	Artıbir	1,500	38.2	**43.8**	18.0	5.6
23-27 Nov	Yöneylem	2,400	42.8	**43.3**	13.9	0.5
15-20 Nov	MetroPOLL	2,122	**44.5**	39.4	16.0	5.1
29 Oct–6 Nov	Avrasya	2,560	38.4	**47.9**	13.7	9.5
November	SAROS	11,028	40.2	**41.0**	18.8	0.8
24-28 Oct	Yöneylem	2,400	40.7	**43.6**	15,7	2.9
15-18 Oct	MetroPOLL	2,145	**45.4**	41.3	13.2	4.1
10-18 Oct	Artıbir	1,500	38.5	**43.4**	18.1	4.9
5-14 Oct	ASAL	2,312	**42.8**	38.8	18.4	4.0
26-30 Sep	Yöneylem	2,400	40.6	**46.8**	12.6	6.2
17-20 Sep	MetroPOLL	2,119	**44.9**	43.9	11.2	1.0
15-20 Sep	Area	3,123	31.8	**36.5**	31.6	4.7
5-14 Sep	Artıbir	1,500	38.2	**48.1**	13,7	9.9
September	KONDA	–	35.0	**37.0**	28.0	2.0
September	SAROS	2,025	**41.3**	39.0	19.7	2.3
September	Aksoy	1,067	46.4	**53.6**	–	7.2
25 Aug–1 Sept	Yöneylem	2,403	38.0	**48.7**	13.3	10.7
22-28 Aug	Avrasya	2,000	38.0	**44.7**	18.3	6.7
13-17 Aug	MetroPOLL	1,717	41.4	**47.7**	10.9	6.3
30 Jul–8 Aug	Avrasya	2,410	35.8	**56.5**	7.7	20.7
1-4 Aug	Areda Survey	3,872	**47.9**	42.4	9.7	5.5
August	HBS	–	**56.0**	44.0	–	12.0
11-16 Jul	MetroPOLL	2,091	42.7	**45.4**	11.9	2.7
2-3 Jul	Gezici	2,680	46.8	**53.2**	–	6.4
Jul	SAROS	1,672	**37.6**	36.5	25.9	1.1
25 Jun–1 Jul	Avrasya	1,460	37,9	**54.1**	8.0	16.2
20-30 Jun	BUPAR	2,986	31.2	**43.4**	25.4	12.2
24-28 Jun	Yöneylem	2,704	37.5	**46.6**	15.9	9.1
10-21 Jun	Objektif	9,960	38.9	**51.7**	9.4	12.8
11-15 Jun	MetroPOLL	2,123	39.8	**46.1**	14.1	6.3
7-14 Jun	ASAL	3,000	**36.8**	35.1	28.1	1.7
June	KONDA	–	34.0	31.0	**35.0**	1.0
June	Artıbir	1,500	38.4	**47.6**	14	9.2
26 May–1 Jun	Avrasya	1,500	39.1	**51.5**	9.4	12.4
16-23 May	Artıbir	1,500	39.7	**48.2**	12.1	8.5
12-15 May	Yöneylem	2,400	36.5	**44.9**	18.7	8.4
5-8 May	ASAL	2,400	**43.1**	32.4	24.5	10.7
27 Apr–3 May	Avrasya	2,460	40.2	**51.3**	8.5	11.1
May	MetroPOLL	–	40.5	**42.7**	16.8	2.2
May	SAROS	2,987	48.8	**51.2**	–	2.4
14-20 Apr	MetroPOLL	2,164	42.5	**43.3**	13.5	0.8
8-10 Apr	ASAL	2,100	**42.3**	33.0	24.7	9.3
1-4 Apr	Sosyo Politik	2,010	38.1	**40.5**	21.4	2.4
24-29 Mar	Avrasya	2,490	41.9	**46.8**	11.3	4.9
3–6 Mar	Yöneylem	2,488	38.6	**40.1**	21.3	1.5
Feb	GEZİCİ	–	47.4	**52.6**	–	5.2
24–31 Jan	AKAM	1,860	40	**60**	–	20
9–14 Jan	AKAM	1,260	42.0	**53.9**	4.1	11.9

==== 2019–2021 ====
Fieldwork date	Polling firm	Sample size			Undecided	Lead
Fieldwork date	Polling firm	Sample size	Erdoğan People's	Kılıçdaroğlu Nation	Undecided	Lead
23–27 Dec	AKAM	2,460	40.5	**53.9**	–	13.4
14–15 Dec	AKAM	1,260	32.1	**50.6**	17.3	18.5
13–20 Nov	Optimar	2,507	**35.4**	33.9	30.6	1.5
11–17 Nov	AKAM	1,260	34.1	**47.9**	18.0	13.8
27 Oct – 3 Nov	Yöneylem	2,000	46.5	**53.5**	–	7.0
9–14 Oct	AKAM	1,500	47.1	**52.9**	–	5.8
Oct	SAROS	1,854	**47.9**	37.9	14.1	10.0
19–27 Sep	Optimar	1,938	**41.2**	34.7	24.1	6.5
21–28 Aug	AKAM	2,460	45.8	**54.2**	–	8.4
Aug	Yöneylem	3,040	38.6	**42.9**	18.6	4.3
11–14 Aug	AKAM	N/A	46.1	**53.9**	–	7.8
Aug	Optimar	N/A	**47.4**	31.8	20.9	15.6
July	Bupar	–	31.2	**43.4**	25.4	12.2
26–30 Jul	Yöneylem	3,040	40.6	**41.0**	18.4	0.4
10–13 Jul	Optimar	1,726	**49.2**	30.8	20.0	18.4
25–29 Jun	Yöneylem	3,848	**43.4**	38.7	17.9	4.7
23–28 Jun	AKAM	2,460	39.1	**44.0**	16.9	4.9
8–13 Jun	AKAM	2,460	35.2	**41.8**	23.0	6.6
May	Gezici	2,280	43.1	**44.8**	12.1	1.7
21–25 May	Yöneylem	3,140	**44.8**	40.4	14.9	4.4
22–24 May	Optimar	1,836	**46.7**	35.5	17.8	11.2
12-15 May	Yöneylem	2.400	36.5	**44.9**	18.7	8.4
6–9 May	İEA	1,506	**44.2**	39.4	16.4	4.8
27 Apr-3 May	AKAM	2.460	40.2	**51.3**	8.5	11,1
27–30 Apr	Yöneylem	3,605	**45.5**	32.4	22.3	13.1
26–30 Apr	Aksoy	1,067	**37.2**	32.5	30.3	4.7
16–21 Apr	Metropoll	1,752	**42.5**	39.7	17.8	2.8
14–20 Apr	MetroPOLL	2.164	42.5	**43.3**	13.5	0.8
1–4 Apr	Sosyo Politik	2.010	38.1	**40.5**	21.4	2.4
Mar	Aksoy	N/A	**39.6**	29.9	30.5	9.7
Mar	SAROS	3,042	**45.1**	39.9	15.0	5.2
29–31 Mar	Yöneylem	3,140	**47.3**	31.9	20.9	15.4
24–29 Mar	AKAM	2.490	41.9	**46.8**	11.3	4.9
28 Feb – 5 Mar	Optimar	2,207	**44.7**	27.0	28.3	17.7
Feb	Aksoy	2,400	**38.9**	31.4	29.7	7.5
Jan	SAROS	3,034	**42.2**	23.7	34.1	18.5
Jan	Aksoy	2,400	**40.0**	29.2	30.7	10.8
15–30 Jan	Yöneylem	5,292	**41.0**	29.0	29.6	12.0
20–26 Jan	ADA	3,245	**52.8**	27.8	19.4	25.0
12–20 Jan	Optimar	2,089	**45.8**	27.2	27.0	18.6
6–10 Jan	AKAM	1,460	**37.4**	35.9	26.7	1.5
2021
Dec	Aksoy	2,400	**39.0**	29.7	31.3	9.3
19–23 Dec	MetroPoll	1,791	**45.2**	27.8	27.0	17.4
3–9 Dec	Optimar	2,253	**47.8**	42.2	10.0	5.6
Nov	SAROS	3,092	**42.5**	32.0	25.4	10.5
21–26 Nov	AKAM	2,460	**41.0**	38.9	20.1	2.1
Oct	Aksoy	2,400	**40.6**	31.3	28.1	9.3
19–24 Oct	AKAM	2,460	**41.2**	38.5	20.3	2.7
21–25 Sep	AKAM	2,460	**38.5**	38.1	23.4	0.4
22–27 Aug	AKAM	2,460	**41.4**	40.6	18.0	0.8
May	ORC	2,316	**54.1**	36.4	9.5	17.7
2020
28–31 Dec	ORC	2,980	**53.7**	31.7	14.6	22.0
2019

=== Eliminated candidates ===
==== Erdoğan vs. İnce ====
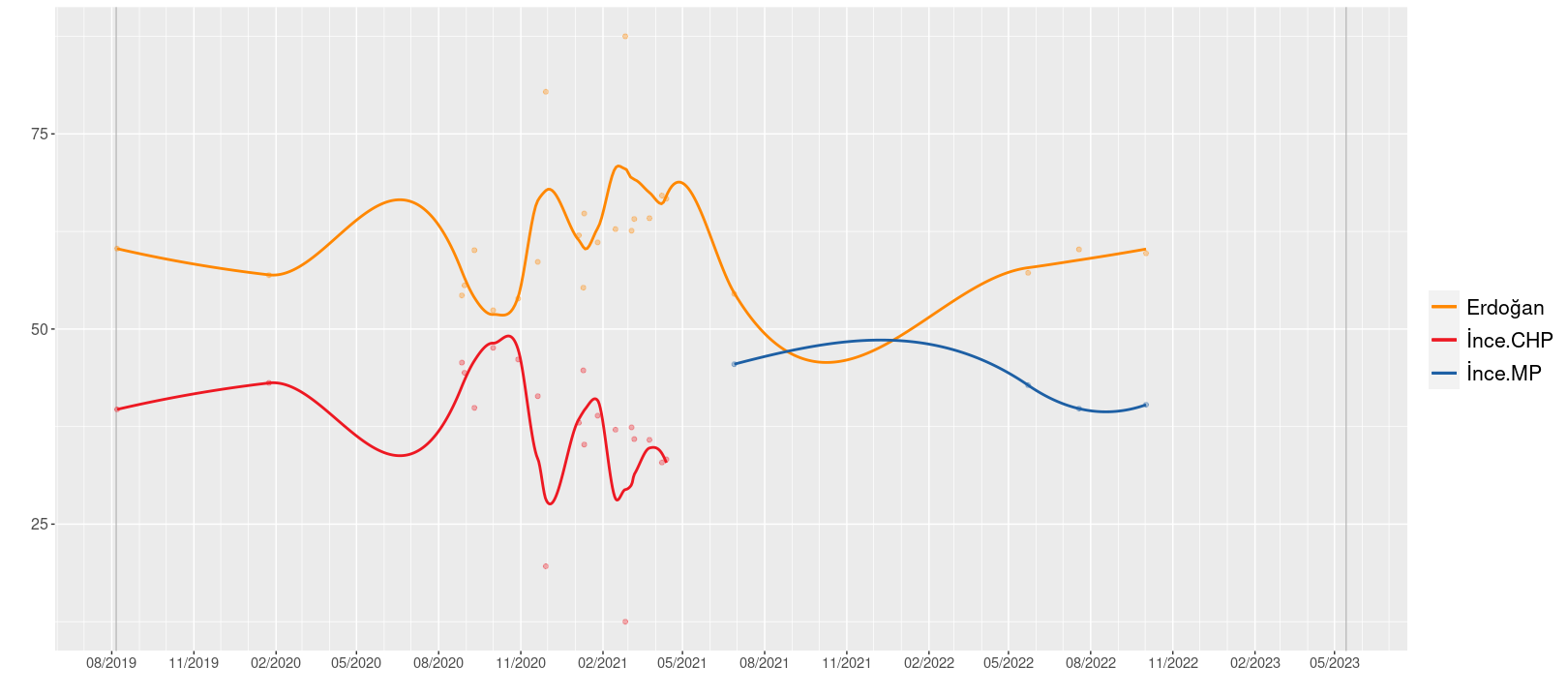

Fieldwork date	Polling firm	Sample size			Undecided	Lead
Fieldwork date	Polling firm	Sample size	Erdoğan AKP	İnce MP	Undecided	Lead
15–17 March	TAG	1850	47.4	36.1	16.5	11.3
2023
Feb	AR-G	–	52.0	11.0	37.0	15
2022
Oct	SAROS	1,854	49.8	27.0	23.2	22.8
19–27 Sep	Optimar	1,938	43.1	30.4	26.4	12.7
Aug	Optimar	N/A	49.9	29.4	20.7	20.5
10–13 Jul	Optimar	1,726	49.4	26.4	24.2	23.0
23–28 Jun	AKAM	2,460	41.0	34.2	24.8	6.8
17 May 2021	İnce founded the Homeland Party.					
Fieldwork date	Polling firm	Sample size	Erdoğan AKP	İnce CHP	Undecided	Lead
Mar	Aksoy	N/A	41.8	20.9	37.3	20.9
Mar	SAROS	3,042	44.7	21.9	33.4	22.8
28 Feb – 5 Mar	Optimar	2,207	44.2	26.4	29.4	17.8
Feb	Yöneylem	N/A	45.1	25.2	29.7	19.9
Feb	Aksoy	2,400	39.6	22.2	38.2	17.4
Jan	SAROS	3,034	42.0	6.0	51.9	36.0
Jan	Aksoy	2,400	39.6	23.4	36.9	16.2
20–26 Jan	ADA	3,245	50.5	28.1	21.4	22.4
12–20 Jan	Optimar	2,089	45.0	28.6	26.4	16.4
6–10 Jan	AKAM	1,460	37.9	30.6	31.5	7.3
2021
Dec	Aksoy	2,400	40.2	24.6	35.2	15.6
19–23 Dec	MetroPoll	1,791	43.1	23.4	33.5	19.7
Nov	SAROS	3,092	42.3	10.3	47.4	32.0
Oct	Aksoy	2,400	41.4	29.2	29.4	12.2
19–24 Oct	AKAM	2,460	41.9	35.9	22.2	6.0
21–25 Sep	AKAM	2,460	38.7	35.1	26.2	3.6
Aug	MetroPoll	N/A	48.5	32.2	19.3	16.3
22–27 Aug	AKAM	2,460	42.7	35.9	21.4	6.8
10–12 Aug	Optimar	2,121	44.5	33.5	22.0	11.0
10–24 Jan	Yöneylem	2,507	43.1	32.6	24.3	10.5
2020
2–7 Aug	SAROS	3,012	40.6	26.7	32.7	13.9
2019

=== Hypothetical candidates ===
==== Erdoğan vs. İmamoğlu ====
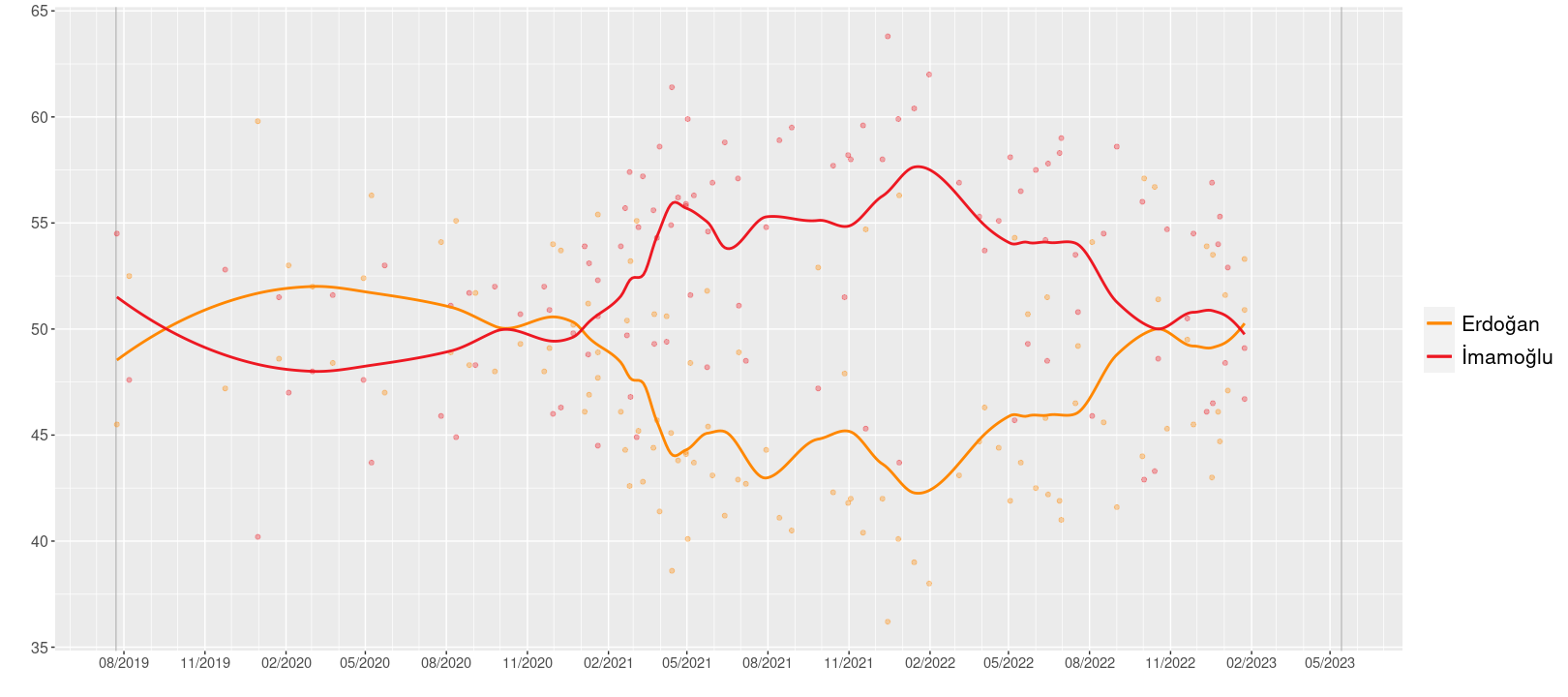

Fieldwork date	Polling firm	Sample size			Undecided	Lead
Fieldwork date	Polling firm	Sample size	Erdoğan AKP	İmamoğlu CHP	Undecided	Lead
Jul	Bupar	–	30.5	**43.9**	25.6	13.4
12-15 May	Yöneylem	2.400	36.0	**46.5**	17.7	10.5
27 Apr-3 May	AKAM	2.460	38.8	**53.7**	7.5	14.9
14–20 Apr	MetroPOLL	2.164	40.0	**49.7**	9.8	9.7
1–4 APR	Sosyo Politik	2.010	36.7	**42.5**	20.8	5.8
24–29 Mar	AKAM	2.490	42.2	**52.1**	5.7	9.9
3–6 Mar	Yöneylem	2.488	37.6	**49.6**	12.8	12
24–31 Jan	AKAM	1.860	38	**62**	–	24
9–14 Jan	AKAM	1.260	38.1	**59.1**	2.1	21
2022
23–27 Dec	AKAM	2,460	39.1	**58.4**	–	19.3
14–15 Dec	AKAM	1,260	31	**54.7**	14.3	23.7
13–20 Nov	Optimar	2,507	**41.3**	34.2	24.5	7.1
11–17 Nov	AKAM	1,260	33.6	**49.5**	16.9	15.9
27 Oct – 3 Nov	Yöneylem	2,000	42.0	**58.0**	–	16.0
9–14 Oct	AKAM	1,500	42.3	**57.7**	–	15.4
Oct	SAROS	1,854	**47.3**	41.3	11.3	6.0
19–27 Sep	Optimar	1,938	**42.6**	38.0	19.5	4.6
21–28 Aug	AKAM	2,460	40.5	**59.5**	–	19.0
Aug	Yöneylem	3,040	37.8	**48.5**	13.6	10.7
11–14 Aug	AKAM	N/A	41.1	**58.9**	–	17.8
Aug	Optimar	N/A	**46.3**	36.4	17.3	9.9
26–30 Jul	Yöneylem	3,040	39.2	**48.5**	12.3	9.3
10–13 Jul	Optimar	1,726	**48.1**	37.8	14.1	10.3
25–29 Jun	Yöneylem	3,848	40.6	**46.1**	13.3	5.5
21−29 Jun	Artıbir	1,500	44.2	**46.1**	9.7	1.9
23−28 Jun	AKAM	2,460	37.8	**50.2**	12.0	14.4
8–13 Jun	AKAM	2,460	34.7	**49.6**	15.7	14.9
5–30 May	Sandık Analiz	4,477	43.1	**56.9**	–	13.8
21–25 May	Yöneylem	3,140	40.4	**48.5**	11.1	8.1
22–24 May	Optimar	1,836	**44.9**	41.8	13.3	3.1
6–9 May	İEA	1,506	39.9	**51.4**	8.7	11.5
27–30 Apr	Yöneylem	3,605	40.3	**42.9**	16.8	2.6
Apr	AKAM	N/A	32.1	**48.0**	19.9	15.9
26–30 Apr	Aksoy	1,067	36.0	**45.5**	18.6	9.5
9–30 Apr	Sandık Analiz	2,427	44.2	**55.8**	–	11.6
16–21 Apr	Metropoll	1,752	38.8	**49.7**	11.5	10.9
11–14 Apr	AKAM	1,460	30.5	**48.6**	20.9	18.1
Mar	Aksoy	N/A	37.0	**45.1**	17.9	8.1
Mar	SAROS	3,042	**45.2**	44.2	10.6	1.0
29–31 Mar	Yöneylem	3,140	**42.8**	42.6	14.5	0.2
26–31 Mar	AKAM	2,460	33.6	**47.6**	18.8	14.0
7–24 Mar	Sandık Analiz	N/A	44.4	**55.6**	–	11.2
7–12 Mar	AKAM	1,480	35.2	**47.0**	17.8	11.8
28 Feb – 5 Mar	Optimar	2,207	**42.5**	34.6	22.9	7.9
Feb	Sandık Analiz	9,804	45.7	**54.3**	–	8.6
Feb	Yöneylem	N/A	**41.9**	40.8	17.3	1.1
Feb	Aksoy	2,400	37.3	**45.3**	17.4	8.0
18–25 Feb	AKAM	2,184	34.3	**46.2**	19.5	11.9
19–22 Feb	Metropoll	1,604	**44.3**	43.7	12.1	0.6
Jan	Sandık Analiz	9,738	44.3	**55.7**	–	11.4
Jan	SAROS	3,034	**42.9**	37.8	19.3	5.1
Jan	Aksoy	2,400	37.7	**44.1**	18.2	6.4
15–30 Jan	Yöneylem	5,292	38.8	**40.1**	20.7	1.3
12–20 Jan	Optimar	2,089	**43.9**	35.2	20.8	8.7
6–10 Jan	AKAM	1,460	37.2	**42.1**	20.7	4.9
4–9 Jan	Artıbir	1,500	**43.2**	41.2	15.6	2.0
2021
Dec	Sandık Analiz	3,809	47.7	**52.3**	–	4.6
Dec	Aksoy	2,400	37.0	**43.3**	19.7	6.3
19–23 Dec	MetroPoll	1,791	**41.5**	41.2	17.3	0.3
21 Nov – 9 Dec	Konsensus	1,500	**53.7**	46.3	–	7.4
Nov	SAROS	3,092	**42.5**	36.2	21.3	6.3
21–26 Nov	AKAM	2,460	41.5	**43.1**	15.4	1.6
Oct	Aksoy	2,400	40.6	**44.0**	15.4	3.4
19–24 Oct	AKAM	2,460	41.1	**42.3**	16.6	1.2
21–25 Sep	AKAM	2,460	38.7	**41.9**	19.4	3.2
Aug	MetroPoll	N/A	**46.5**	43.5	10.0	3.0
22–27 Aug	AKAM	2,460	40.8	**43.7**	15.5	2.9
10–12 Aug	Optimar	2,121	**45.1**	36.8	18.1	8.3
5–6 Aug	Aksoy	1,067	37.1	**38.7**	24.2	1.6
18–26 Jul	Artıbir	1,500	**39.0**	33.1	27.9	5.9
20–23 May	AKAM	2,460	40.4	**45.5**	14.1	5.1
20 Apr – 8 May	Optimar	2,307	**44.7**	34.7	20.6	10.0
20–29 Apr	Yöneylem	2,409	**40.8**	37.0	22.2	3.8
18–25 Mar	Yöneylem	2,605	42.1	**44.9**	13.0	2.8
20 Feb – 2 Mar	Artıbir	1,500	**42.9**	39.6	17.5	3.3
28 Jan – 4 Feb	Artıbir	1,500	**43.2**	38.3	18.5	4.9
10–24 Jan	Yöneylem	2,507	39.1	**41.4**	19.6	2.3
2020
28–31 Dec	ORC	2,980	**50.9**	34.2	14.9	16.7
19–24 Nov	PIAR	2,416	39.7	**44.5**	15.8	4.8
2–7 Aug	SAROS	3,012	**40.7**	36.9	22.4	3.8
2019

==== Erdoğan vs. Yavaş ====
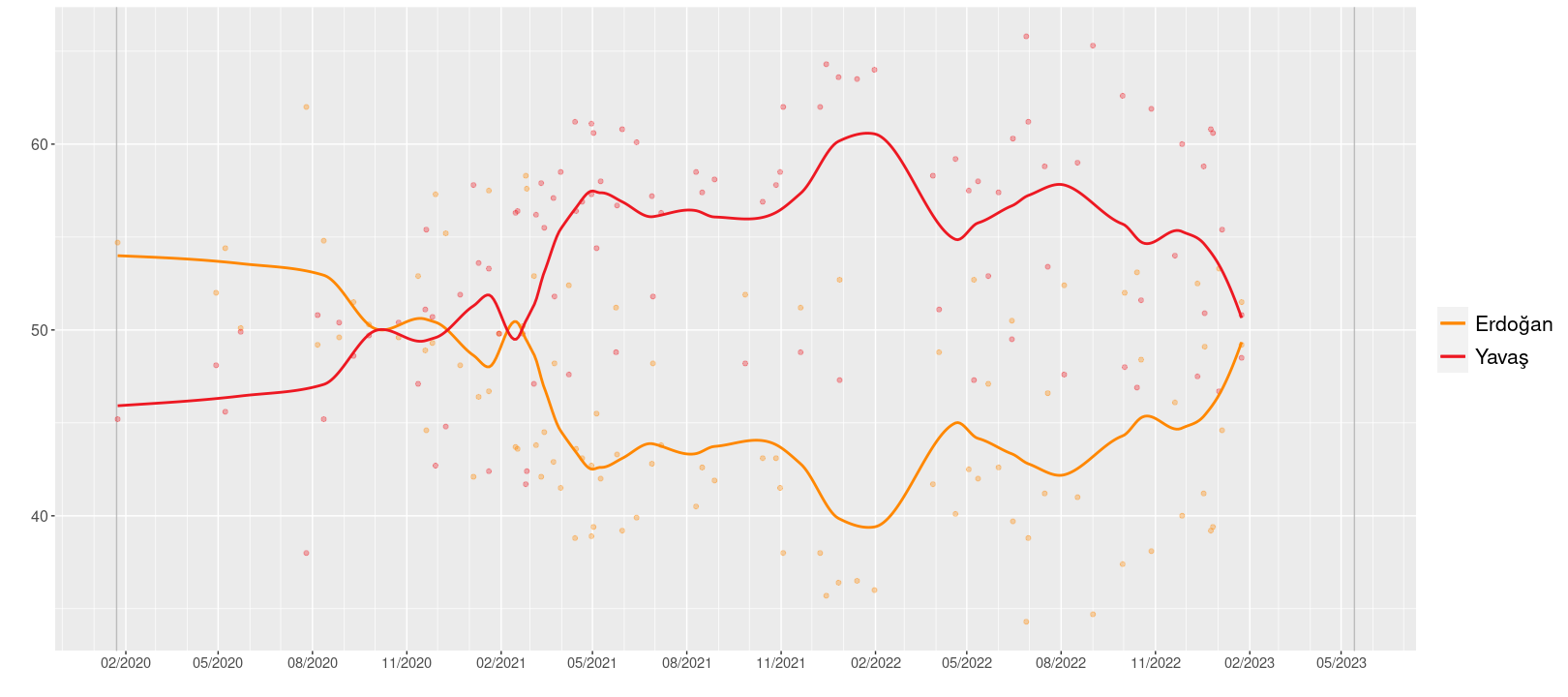

Fieldwork date	Polling firm	Sample size			Undecided	Lead
Fieldwork date	Polling firm	Sample size	Erdoğan AKP	Yavaş CHP	Undecided	Lead
Jul	Bupar	–	30.0	**47.4**	22.6	17.4
27 Apr-3 May	AKAM	2.460	38.4	**52.0**	9.6	13.6
14–20 Apr	MetroPOLL	2.164	36.5	**53.9**	9.0	17.4
1–4 Apr	Sosyo Politik	2.010	32.5	**34.0**	33.4	0.6
24–29 Mar	AKAM	2.490	39.7	**55.5**	4.8	15.8
Feb	AR-G	–	42.0	**56.0**	2.0	14
24–31 Jan	AKAM	1.860	36	**64**	–	28
9–14 Jan	AKAM	1.260	35.4	**61.5**	3.1	26.1
2022
23–27 Dec	AKAM	2,460	35.2	**61.5**	–	26.3
14–15 Dec	AKAM	1,260	30.1	**54.2**	15.7	24.1
13–20 Nov	Optimar	2,507	**41.3**	39.3	19.4	2
11–17 Nov	AKAM	1,260	32.8	**49.2**	18.0	16.4
27 Oct – 3 Nov	Yöneylem	2,000	38.0	**62.0**	–	24.0
9–14 Oct	AKAM	1,500	43.1	**56.9**	–	13.8
Oct	SAROS	1,854	**47.9**	38.8	13.3	9.1
19–27 Sep	Optimar	1,938	**42.3**	39.3	18.5	3.0
21–28 Aug	AKAM	2,460	41.9	**58.1**	–	16.2
Aug	Yöneylem	3,040	34.8	**53.8**	11.3	19.0
11–14 Aug	AKAM	N/A	42.6	**57.4**	–	14.8
Aug	Optimar	N/A	**46.5**	41.8	11.5	4.7
26–30 Jul	Yöneylem	3,040	36.6	**52.8**	10.6	16.2
10–13 Jul	Optimar	1,726	**46.8**	39.3	13.9	7.5
25–29 Jun	Yöneylem	3,848	38.4	**49.3**	12.4	10.9
21–29 Jun	Artıbir	1,500	42.7	**45.8**	11.5	3.1
23–28 Jun	AKAM	2,460	37.0	**49.4**	13.6	12.4
8–13 Jun	AKAM	2,460	32.0	**48.2**	19.8	16.2
5–30 May	Sandık Analiz	4,477	39.2	**60.8**	–	21.6
21–25 May	Yöneylem	3,140	38.8	**50.7**	10.5	11.9
22–24 May	Optimar	1,836	**44.1**	42.0	13.9	2.1
6–9 May	İEA	1,506	38.1	**52.5**	9.4	14.4
27–30 Apr	Yöneylem	3,605	38.9	**46.5**	14.5	7.6
Apr	AKAM	N/A	30.9	**47.5**	21.6	16.6
26–30 Apr	Aksoy	1,067	35.7	**47.9**	16.4	12.2
9–30 Apr	Sandık Analiz	2,427	38.9	**61.1**	–	22.2
16–21 Apr	Metropoll	1,752	37.5	**49.4**	13.1	11.9
11–14 Apr	AKAM	1,460	30.5	**48.0**	21.5	17.5
Mar	Aksoy	N/A	37.0	**47.8**	15.2	10.8
Mar	SAROS	3,042	**45.2**	41.0	13.8	4.2
29–31 Mar	Yöneylem	3,140	41.3	**45.5**	13.2	4.2
26–31 Mar	AKAM	2,460	33.8	**47.7**	18.5	13.9
7–24 Mar	Sandık Analiz	N/A	42.9	**57.1**	–	14.2
7–12 Mar	AKAM	1,480	34.3	**47.1**	18.6	12.8
28 Feb – 5 Mar	Optimar	2,207	**41.2**	36.7	22.1	4.5
Feb	Sandık Analiz	9,804	44.5	**55.5**	–	11.0
Feb	Yöneylem	N/A	40.1	**43.0**	16.9	2.9
Feb	Aksoy	2,400	37.0	**47.5**	15.5	10.5
18–25 Feb	AKAM	2,184	34.7	**48.6**	16.7	13.9
19–22 Feb	Metropoll	1,604	**44.6**	44.4	11.1	0.2
Jan	Sandık Analiz	9,746	43.6	**56.4**	–	12.8
Jan	SAROS	3,034	**41.9**	30.9	27.1	11.0
Jan	Aksoy	2,400	37.7	**48.5**	13.8	10.8
15–30 Jan	Yöneylem	5,292	38.4	38.4	22.9	0.0
12–20 Jan	Optimar	2,089	**43.1**	31.8	25.0	11.9
6–10 Jan	AKAM	1,460	36.9	**42.7**	20.4	5.8
2021
Dec	Sandık Analiz	3,809	46.7	**53.3**	–	6.6
Dec	Aksoy	2,400	35.4	**48.7**	15.8	13.3
19–23 Dec	MetroPoll	1,791	40.7	**43.9**	15.4	3.2
21 Nov – 9 Dec	Konsensus	1,500	**55.2**	44.8	–	10.4
Nov	Sandık Analiz	N/A	48.9	**51.1**	–	1.2
Nov	SAROS	3,092	**42.8**	31.9	25.2	10.9
21–26 Nov	AKAM	2,460	41.1	**42.2**	16.7	1.1
2–12 Nov	Artıbir	1,500	**43.6**	38.9	17.5	4.7
Oct	Aksoy	2,400	39.5	**49.0**	11.5	9.5
19–24 Oct	AKAM	2,460	39.8	**40.4**	19.8	0.6
21–25 Sep	AKAM	2,460	**38.0**	37.6	24.4	0.4
Aug	MetroPoll	N/A	**45.5**	43.0	11.6	2.5
22–27 Aug	AKAM	2,460	40.4	**41.1**	18.5	0.7
10–12 Aug	Optimar	2,121	**44.5**	36.7	18.8	7.8
5–6 Aug	Aksoy	1,067	39.2	**40.4**	20.4	1.2
18–26 Jul	Artıbir	1,500	**49.7**	30.5	19.8	19.2
20–23 May	AKAM	2,460	**39.9**	39.7	20.4	0.2
20 Apr – 8 May	Optimar	2,307	**43.0**	36.1	20.9	6.9
20–29 Apr	Yöneylem	2,409	**39.9**	36.9	23.3	3.0
10–24 Jan	Yöneylem	2,507	**39.5**	32.6	27.8	6.9
2020

==== Erdoğan vs. Akşener ====
===== 2022 =====
Fieldwork date	Polling firm	Sample size			Undecided	Lead
Fieldwork date	Polling firm	Sample size	Erdoğan AKP	Akşener İYİ	Undecided	Lead
July	Bupar	–	30.1	**37.3**	32.6	7.2
14–20 Apr	MetroPOLL	2.164	41.9	**43.8**	13,7	1.9
1–4 Apr	Sosyo Politik	2.010	34.5	28.7	**36.8**	2.3

===== 2021 =====
Fieldwork date	Polling firm	Sample size			Undecided	Lead
Fieldwork date	Polling firm	Sample size	Erdoğan AKP	Akşener İYİ	Undecided	Lead
Oct	SAROS	1,854	**48.0**	37.1	14.8	10.9
21–28 Aug	AKAM	2,460	46.0	**54.0**	–	8.0
Aug	Yöneylem	3,040	37.2	**45.6**	17.2	8.4
11–14 Aug	AKAM	N/A	46.8	**53.2**	–	6.4
26–30 Jul	Yöneylem	3,040	40.1	**44.2**	15.7	4.1
25–29 Jun	Yöneylem	3,848	41.2	**41.6**	17.2	0.4
23–28 Jun	AKAM	2,460	39.8	**42.3**	17.9	2.5
8–13 Jun	AKAM	2,460	34.1	**38.9**	27.0	4.8
21–25 May	Yöneylem	3,140	42.2	**43.0**	14.8	0.8
22–24 May	Optimar	1,836	**43.8**	30.0	26.2	13.8
6–9 May	İEA	1,506	39.1	**45.4**	15.5	6.3
27–30 Apr	Yöneylem	3,605	**42.6**	38.1	19.3	4.5
26–30 Apr	Aksoy	1,067	37.4	**37.5**	25.1	0.1
16–21 Apr	Metropoll	1,752	38.5	**42.5**	19.0	4.0
Mar	Aksoy	N/A	**39.5**	38.0	22.5	1.5
Mar	SAROS	3,042	**45.1**	34.0	20.8	11.1
29–31 Mar	Yöneylem	3,140	**44.4**	36.4	19.2	8.0
7–24 Mar	Sandık Analiz	4,039	49.1	**50.9**	–	1.8
28 Feb – 5 Mar	Optimar	2,207	**43.6**	27.0	29.5	16.6
Feb	Sandık Analiz	9,804	**50.3**	49.7	–	0.6
Feb	Yöneylem	N/A	**43.9**	34.2	21.9	9.7
Feb	Aksoy	2,400	**40.2**	35.8	24.0	4.4
Jan	Sandık Analiz	9,733	49.5	**50.5**	–	1.0
Jan	SAROS	3,034	**42.0**	27.0	30.9	15.0
Jan	Aksoy	2,400	**40.6**	38.1	21.3	2.5
15–30 Jan	Yöneylem	5,292	**40.1**	32.1	27.4	8.0
20–26 Jan	ADA	3,245	**48.3**	37.6	14.1	10.7
12–20 Jan	Optimar	2,089	**43.8**	30.0	26.2	13.8
6–10 Jan	AKAM	1,460	**37.1**	36.4	26.5	0.7
2021
Dec	Aksoy	2,400	**38.1**	37.1	24.8	1.0
19–23 Dec	MetroPoll	1,791	**42.9**	30.2	26.9	12.7
21 Nov – 9 Dec	Konsensus	1,500	**63.8**	37.2	–	26.6
Nov	SAROS	3,092	**42.6**	19.7	37.7	22.9
21–26 Nov	AKAM	2,460	**41.5**	40.3	18.2	1.2
Oct	Aksoy	2,400	**41.4**	35.9	22.7	5.5
19–24 Oct	AKAM	2,460	**40.6**	38.1	21.3	2.5
21–25 Sep	AKAM	2,460	**37.9**	36.8	25.3	1.1
Aug	MetroPoll	N/A	**46.8**	38.3	14.9	8.5
22–27 Aug	AKAM	2,460	**42.0**	40.1	17.9	1.9
5–6 Aug	Aksoy	1,067	**40.4**	32.2	27.3	8.2
May	ORC	2,316	**51.9**	37.5	10.6	14.4
10–24 Jan	Yöneylem	2,507	**40.8**	30.1	29.1	10.7
2020
28–31 Dec	ORC	2,980	**50.2**	38.0	11.8	12.2
2019

==== Erdoğan vs. Babacan ====
Fieldwork date	Polling firm	Sample size			Undecided	Lead
Fieldwork date	Polling firm	Sample size	Erdoğan AKP	Babacan DEVA	Undecided	Lead
1–4 April	Sosyo Politik	2.010	36.6	21.0	**42.3**	5.7
2022
23–27 Dec	AKAM	2,460	44.3	**48.5**	–	4.2
14–15 Dec	AKAM	1,260	32.8	**46.5**	21.5	13.7
11–17 Nov	AKAM	1,260	33.5	**42.9**	23.6	9.4
23–28 Oct	AKAM	2,460	34.6	**42.0**	23.4	7.4
9–14 Oct	AKAM	1,500	48.1	**51.9**	–	3.8
Oct	SAROS	1,854	**48.9**	18.7	32.5	30.2
23–28 Jun	AKAM	2,460	**39.0**	36.1	24.9	2.9
6–9 May	İEA	1,506	**43.5**	36.9	19.6	6.6
Mar	Aksoy	N/A	**40.6**	20.7	38.7	19.9
Mar	SAROS	3,042	**45.2**	19.6	35.1	25.6
28 Feb – 5 Mar	Optimar	2,207	**43.2**	17.4	39.4	25.8
Feb	Aksoy	2,400	**40.1**	20.4	39.5	19.7
Jan	SAROS	3,034	**42.2**	3.4	54.4	38.8
Jan	Aksoy	2,400	**41.0**	21.8	37.2	19.2
15–30 Jan	Yöneylem	5,292	**40.3**	21.9	37.5	18.4
20–26 Jan	ADA	3,245	**51.9**	25.9	22.2	26.0
12–20 Jan	Optimar	2,089	**45.1**	20.9	34.5	24.2
6–10 Jan	AKAM	1,460	**37.2**	34.3	28.5	2.9
2021
Dec	Aksoy	2,400	**40.4**	25.4	34.2	15.0
19–23 Dec	MetroPoll	1,791	**43.6**	21.4	35.0	22.2
Nov	SAROS	3,092	**42.8**	15.0	42.2	27.8
21–26 Nov	AKAM	2,460	**40.1**	37.9	22.0	2.2
Oct	Aksoy	2,400	**42.1**	25.2	32.7	16.9
19–24 Oct	AKAM	2,460	**39.9**	36.7	23.4	3.2
22–27 Aug	AKAM	2,460	**41.9**	35.2	22.9	6.7
5–6 Aug	Aksoy	1,067	**39.9**	14.6	45.5	25.3
18–25 Mar	Yöneylem	2,605	**46.6**	24.7	28.7	21.9
10–24 Jan	Yöneylem	2,507	**37.0**	26.1	36.9	10.9
2020
2–7 Aug	SAROS	3,012	**38.7**	6.1	55.2	32.6
2019

==== Erdoğan vs. Gül ====
Fieldwork date	Polling firm	Sample size			Undecided	Lead
Fieldwork date	Polling firm	Sample size	Erdoğan AKP	Gül IND	Undecided	Lead
23–27 Dec	AKAM	2,460	54.7	38.0	–	16.7
Oct	SAROS	1,854	49.4	11.8	38.7	37.6
23–28 Jun	AKAM	2,460	39.9	34.5	25.6	5.4
Mar	Aksoy	N/A	39.5	16.3	44.2	23.2
Mar	SAROS	3,042	45.3	18.5	36.2	26.8
28 Feb – 5 Mar	Optimar	2,207	44.2	16.7	39.1	27.5
Feb	Aksoy	2,400	38.4	18.1	43.5	20.3
Jan	SAROS	3,034	41.9	4.0	54.1	37.9
Jan	Aksoy	2,400	40.1	17.2	42.6	22.9
12–20 Jan	Optimar	2,089	43.5	20.3	36.1	23.2
2021
Dec	Aksoy	2,400	38.5	16.9	44.6	21.6
21 Nov – 9 Dec	Konsensus	1,500	76.3	23.7	–	52.6
Nov	SAROS	3,092	42.6	10.5	46.9	32.1
21–26 Nov	AKAM	2,460	43.2	37.1	19.7	6.1
Oct	Aksoy	2,400	41.0	18.7	40.3	22.3
19–24 Oct	AKAM	2,460	40.7	34.5	24.8	6.2
21–25 Sep	AKAM	2,460	41.0	33.4	25.6	7.6
Aug	MetroPoll	N/A	49.6	22.5	27.9	27.1
22–27 Aug	AKAM	2,460	42.1	33.2	24.7	8.9
10–12 Aug	Optimar	2,121	44.3	21.3	34.4	23.0
5–6 Aug	Aksoy	1,067	40.2	15.4	44.4	24.8
May	ORC	2,316	57.4	25.1	17.5	32.3
20 Apr – 8 May	Optimar	2,307	46.7	20.4	32.9	26.3
10–18 Mar	Optimar	2,007	41.8	16.0	42.2	25.8
10–24 Jan	Yöneylem	2,507	37.0	25.2	37.8	11.8
2020
28–31 Dec	ORC	2,980	52.1	32.8	15.1	19.3
2019

== Notes ==
General

Political connections
