= Felicity and Future Alliance =

Felicity and Future Alliance Saadet ve Gelecek İttifakı
- Leader: Mahmut Arıkan; Ahmet Davutoğlu
- Parliamentary group chair: Selçuk Özdağ
- Founded: 6 July 2023
- Dissolved: 13 January 2025
- Preceded by: Nation Alliance
- Merged into: New Path
- Ideology: Conservatism
- Political position: Centre-right to right-wing
- Members: Felicity Party; Future Party
- Grand National Assembly: 20 / 600
- Metropolitan municipalities: 0 / 30
- District municipalities: 6 / 1,351
- Provincial councillors: 3 / 1,251
- Municipal Assemblies: 303 / 20,498

The Felicity and Future Alliance (SGİ; Turkish: Saadet ve Gelecek İttifakı) was a Turkish political alliance between the Felicity Party (SP) and the Future Party (GP) established on 6 July 2023, which includes the establishment of a joint group in the Grand National Assembly of Turkey (TBMM) and cooperation in the elections.

== Background ==
=== 2023 election ===
Before the 2023 parliamentary election, the Justice and Development Party (AKP) and the Nationalist Movement Party (MHP) amended the electoral system so that the distribution of parliamentary deputies would be made by the individual votes of the parties instead of the total votes of the alliances. As a result of this change, it was prevented that the parties that could not get a deputy alone could unite under the roof of the alliance and get a deputy. Thereupon, Temel Karamollaoğlu, President of the Felicity Party, held talks with the Democracy and Progress Party (DEVA) and the Future Party to make a joint list within the Nation Alliance. While the Future Party was in favour of a tripartite alliance, DEVA Party Chairman Ali Babacan refused to enter the elections from the lists of the Felicity Party, so the tripartite alliance could not be established. Instead, Felicity Party, Future Party, DEVA Party and Democrat Party (DP) participated in the elections from the lists of the Republican People's Party. As a result of the elections, DEVA Party won 15 deputies to the TBMM, while Felicity Party and Future Party won 10 deputies.

=== Merger proposal ===
Future Party President Ahmet Davutoğlu proposed to Ali Babacan a model for the complete merger of the Future and DEVA Parties. This model was rejected by the DEVA Party on the grounds that it would lead to double-headedness and confusion of messages in the party administration and would not be sustainable.

=== Joint group talks ===
After the 2023 general election, on 15 June 2023, it was announced to the public that negotiations were held between the Felicity Party, the Future Party and the DEVA Party on cooperation models in the political field, especially the establishment of a joint group in the work of the Turkish Grand National Assembly, and that these issues will be consulted at the party headquarters.

Temel Karamollaoğlu, the Chairman of the Felicity Party, wanted the group to be under the umbrella of the Felicity Party, but Ali Babacan, the Chairman of the DEVA Party, was not in favour of this. Therefore, in order to establish a joint group, a new umbrella party model was discussed in which the three parties preserved their legal entities and gave a certain number of deputies. This model was rejected by the DEVA Party on the grounds that it would not be natural to the electorate, would lead to confusion, would create governance problems and would prevent the parties from developing their own identities.

=== Alliance establishment ===
After DEVA Party withdrew from the talks, talks continued between Felicity Party and Future Party. On 26 June 2023, Temel Karamollaoğlu, the Chairman of the Felicity Party, said "There is a desire in our organisation to form a group. We came to the conclusion that it would be easier to establish such an alliance with the Future Party." On 6 July 2023, Temel Karamollaoğlu and Ahmet Davutoğlu announced the establishment of the alliance in a joint press statement and signed the alliance protocol in front of the public.

== Legislative activities ==
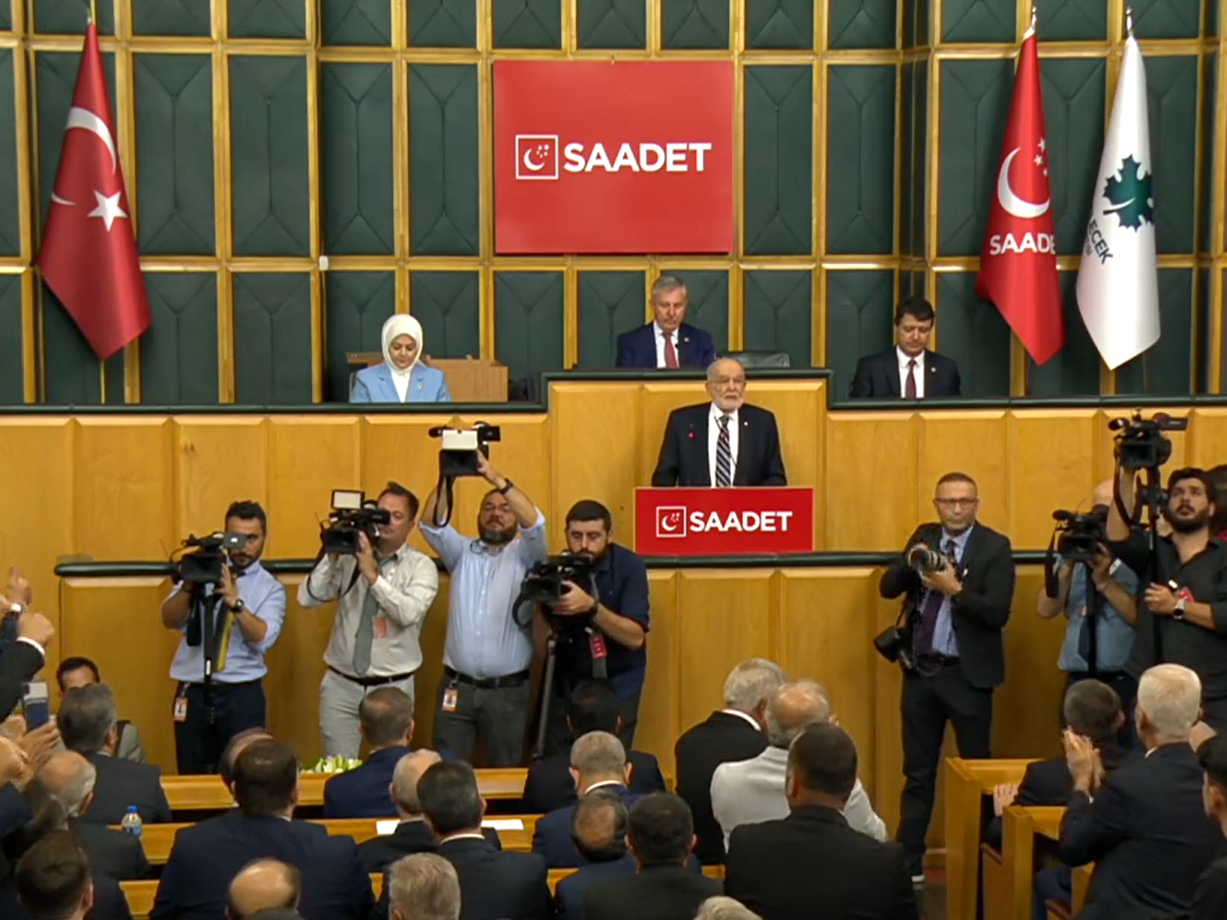
Temel Karamollaoğlu delivers a speech at the group meeting of the Felicity Party.

The first meeting of the Felicity Party group was held on 12 July 2023. The meeting was broadcast live by four TV channels.

The first research motion of the Felicity Party group was about finding another solution to the current economic deterioration instead of the hikes and tax increases made by the Presidential decision after the 2023 elections. The motion was submitted to the parliament by Bülent Kaya, deputy group chairman.

The Parliament went on recess on 16 July until 1 October after the economic regulations were made. The opposition, which found the salary increases inadequate despite the increase in the cost of living in the country, opposed the recess of the parliament while economic problems continued. The Felicity Party group, together with other opposition parties, called on the Parliament to convene extraordinarily on 25 July 2023 in order to "find a solution to the problems caused by the increase in VAT and SCT rates and the price increase in basic necessities". During the roll call on the day of the meeting, AK Party and MHP MPs first did not enter the hall and waited at the door, but after the quorum for the extraordinary meeting was reached, they entered the parliament and participated in the roll call. Taxes and price increases in basic necessities were discussed in the general assembly. The government's justification of the earthquake for the increases was criticised. The opposition said that the necessary additional budget could have been taken immediately after the earthquake and that the earthquake was an excuse. At the end of the meeting, the proposal "to hold a general discussion to find solutions to the problems caused by the increase in VAT and SCT rates and the price increase on basic needs" was rejected with the votes of AK Party and MHP. Parliament was recessed until October. While 109 deputies did not attend the meeting, the Felicity Party group was present at the meeting.

At the initiative of the Felicity Party group and other opposition parties, the Turkish Grand National Assembly convened for the second time for an extraordinary meeting to open a general discussion on the felling of trees in Akbelen Forest for mineral exploration. AK Party and MHP MPs joined the parliament this time after a quorum was established. The motion to resume the work of the Grand National Assembly of Turkey was again rejected by the AK Party and MHP MPs. While 75 deputies, including 37 from the opposition, did not attend the meeting, the Felicity Party group was present in the parliament.
