= New Path =

New Path Yeni Yol
- Abbreviation: YENİ YOL; YY (de facto)
- Chairman: İzzettin Küçük
- Founders: Ali Babacan; Ahmet Davutoğlu; Mahmut Arıkan
- Founded: 10 January 2025
- Preceded by: Felicity and Future Alliance
- Ideology: Felicity Party: Milli Görüş; Islamism; DEVA Party: Liberal conservatism Neoliberalism; Pro-Europeanism
- Political position: Centre-right to right-wing
- Founder parties: Felicity Party; Future Party; Democracy and Progress Party
- Colours: Blue and white
- Grand National Assembly: 20 / 600
- Metropolitan municipalities: 0 / 30
- District municipalities: 7 / 1,351
- Provincial councillors: 4 / 1,251
- Municipal Assemblies: 343 / 20,498

The New Path (YY; Turkish: Yeni Yol) is a Turkish political party that was founded by the Felicity Party (SP), Democracy and Progress Party (DEVA) and the Future Party (GP) to create a joint parliamentary group. The party's chairman is İzzettin Küçük. In the Turkish Grand National Assembly, it has a total of 21 deputies—20 under its own structure and 1 from the founding parties. With this number, it constitutes the sixth-largest group in the parliament.

Although New Path is officially a political party, it primarily serves as a parliamentary group uniting Saadet, Gelecek, and DEVA, which have different political views. These parties maintain their unique political identities, ideologies, and programs while cooperating on common issues. This structure aims to create a more effective opposition bloc, exert greater influence on parliamentary decision-making processes, and better represent various social segments.

== History ==
Before the 2023 parliamentary election, the Justice and Development Party (AKP) and the Nationalist Movement Party (MHP) amended the electoral system so that the distribution of parliamentary deputies would be made by votes for specific parties instead of party alliances. As a result of this change, parties could no longer blend votes from multiple parties to get a deputy elected.

Temel Karamollaoğlu, President of the Felicity Party, held talks with the Democracy and Progress Party (DEVA) and the Future Party to make a joint list within the Nation Alliance. While the Future Party was in favour of a tripartite alliance, DEVA Party Chairman Ali Babacan refused to enter the elections from the lists of the Felicity Party, so the tripartite alliance was not established. Instead, Felicity Party, Future Party, DEVA Party and Democrat Party (DP) participated in the elections from the lists of the Republican People's Party. As a result of the elections, DEVA Party won 15 deputies to the TBMM, while Felicity Party and Future Party won 10 deputies. In July 2023, the Felicity and Future Alliance consisted of SP and GP was formed. In December 2024, Mehmet Emin Ekmen and Ertuğrul Kaya of DEVA joined the SAADET group to help that group. Mustafa Yeneroğlu, Burak Dalgın and Selma Aliye Kavaf left DEVA in reaction of the upcoming merger.

== Members ==
Joining date	Party	Chairman	Political position	Ideology	Total number of MP's in TBMM	True Path MP's
13 January 2025 (6 July 2023, as Felicity and Future Alliance)	SAADET; Felicity Party	Mahmut Arıkan	Right-wing	Millî Görüş; Islamism; Religious nationalism	9 / 600	8 / 21
13 January 2025 (6 July 2023, as Felicity and Future Alliance)	Former members of Future Party (GP)		Centre-right to right-wing	Conservatism; Economic liberalism	2 / 600	2 / 21
13 January 2025	DEVA; Democracy and Progress Party	Ali Babacan	Centre-right	Liberal conservatism Neoliberalism	8 / 600	8 / 21
