= Strengthened parliamentary system =

Parliamentary system proposed by opposition parties in Turkey

A strengthened parliamentary system (Turkish: Güçlendirilmiş parlamenter sistem), also referred to as an enhanced and strengthened parliamentary system (Turkish: İyileştirilmiş ve güçlendirilmiş parlamenter sistem), is a form of government conceived by the Nation Alliance, which consisted of six Turkish political parties: the Republican People's Party, the Good Party, the Democracy and Progress Party, the Future Party, the Felicity Party and the Democrat Party. It is proposed as an alternative to the presidential system effectuated by the ruling People's Alliance following the 2017 Turkish constitutional referendum. Being rooted in a parliamentary system, it envisages a complete overhauling of Turkey's system of government. Although the details of the proposed system are yet to be disclosed, parties have put forth that it constitutes the restoration of the rule of law, reinforcement of parliamentary authority, and extensive restraints on presidential powers.

== Background ==
After the steep relapse in Turkey's economy following the 2018 general election, opposition parties began to regard the presidential system as the source of the country's economic and political crises. Parties decided to use the prefix "strengthened" so that it could be discerned from the parliamentary system nurtured by the pre-amended Constitution of 1982.

Opposition parties had already been voicing their support for the formulation of a new parliamentary system, albeit singly. The Future Party, Good Party, and DEVA had announced their own manifestos for a new system of government, accompanied by certain academic publications and proposals.

Deputy leaders of CHP, Good Party, DEVA, GP, SP, and DP began holding joint discussions at the parliament, eventually reaching a consensus on a draft for the manifesto of their conception. The draft, which is made up of five chapters, was completed in December 2021, and is expected to be signed by the leaders of all aforementioned parties once its redaction is complete.

== Joint manifesto ==
The manifesto is composed of five main categories: Introduction, Legislative, Executive, Judiciary, and the Fundamental Principles of the Democratic System. In order to settle the matter of governmental instability, which was one of AKP's main arguments that pretensioned their hand in the referendum that took place in 2017, strengthened parliamentary model features a constructive vote of no confidence. Hence, it obliges parliamentarians who overthrow a government to replace it with a new one by placing confidence in a successor. In addition to reforming parliamentary procedure, the proposed model makes it a necessity for governments to be formed in parliament, and necessitates the president to sever their ties with their party after they are elected by parliament. The joint manifest also includes thorough reforms regarding the judicial system, press freedom, and public procurement.
