= Sivas (electoral district) =

Electoral district for the Grand National Assembly of Turkey

Coordinates: 39°32′N 37°24′E

- electoral district for the Grand National Assembly of Turkey
- Sivas shown within Turkey
- Province: Sivas
- Electorate: 431,792

Current electoral district
- Created: 1920
- Seats: 5 Historical: 6 (1999-2011) 7 (1995-1999) 6 (1991-1995) 7 (1983-1991) 8 (1977-1983) 9 (1973-1977) 10 (1969-1973) 11 (1965-1969) 11 (1961-1969) 15 (1957-1961) 14 (1954-1957)
- MPs: List: İsmet Yılmaz AKP Mesude Nursuna Memecan AKP Hilmi Bilgin AKP Ali Turan AKP Malik Ecder Özdemir CHP
- Turnout at last election: 86.79%
- Representation
- AK Party: 3 / 5
- MHP: 1 / 5
- CHP: 1 / 5

Sivas is an electoral district of the Grand National Assembly of Turkey. It elects two members of parliament (deputies) to represent the province of the same name for a four-year term by the D'Hondt method, a party-list proportional representation system.

== Members ==
Population reviews of each electoral district are conducted before each general election, which can lead to certain districts being granted a smaller or greater number of parliamentary seats. The number of seats allocated to Sivas has gradually fallen over the last half-century from a high of fifteen in the 1950s to four seats today.

MPs for Sivas, 1999 onwards
Seat	1999 (21st parliament)	2002 (22nd parliament)	2007 (23rd parliament)	2011 (24th parliament)	June 2015 (25th parliament)
MP	Abdüllatif Şener; FP	Abdüllatif Şener; AK Party	Hamza Yerlikaya; AK Party	İsmet Yılmaz; AK Party	
MP	Musa Demirci; FP	Ömer Kulaksız; AK Party	Mehmet Mustafa Açıkalın; AK Party	Mesude Nursuna Memecan; AK Party	Selim Dursun; AK Party
MP	Temel Karamollaoğlu; FP	Osman Kılıç; AK Party		Hilmi Bilgin; AK Party	
MP	Hüsnü Yusuf Gökalp; MHP	Selami Uzun; AK Party		Ali Turan; AK Party	Celal Dağgez; MHP
MP	Mehmet Cengiz Güleç; DSP	Nurettin Sözer; CHP	Malik Ecder Özdemir; CHP		Ali Akyıldız; CHP
MP	Mehmet Ceylan; MHP	Orhan Taş; AK Party	Muhsin Yazıcıoğlu; Independent	Seat abolished	

== General elections ==
=== 2011 ===
2011 Turkish general election: Sivas
List	Candidates	Votes	Of total (%)	± from prev.
AK Party	İsmet Yılmaz, Mesude Nursuna Memecan, Hilmi Bilgin, Ali Turan	234,505	63.34	
CHP	Malik Ecder Özdemir	56,534	15.27	
MHP	None elected	36,836	9.95	
Independent	Abdüllatif Şener	17,101	4.62	
Büyük Birlik	None elected	12,869	3.48	
SAADET	None elected	6,473	1.75	
HAS Party	None elected	2,178	0.59	N/A
DP	None elected	1,048	0.28	
DSP	None elected	527	0.14	'"`UNIQ−−ref−0000000D−QINU`"'
Labour	None elected	525	0.14	
Nationalist Conservative	None elected	377	0.1	
DYP	None elected	363	0.1	
HEPAR	None elected	425	0.11	
TKP	None elected	299	0.08	
MP	None elected	127	0.03	
Liberal Democrat	None elected	73	0.02	
Turnout		370,260	86.79	

=== June 2015 ===
Abbr.	Party	Votes	%
AKP	Justice and Development Party	212,853	57.7%
MHP	Nationalist Movement Party	67,145	18.2%
CHP	Republican People's Party	55,138	14.9%
SP	Felicity Party	23,323	6.3%
HDP	Peoples' Democratic Party	5,036	1.4%
	Other	5,478	1.5%
Total		368,973	
Turnout		86.29	
source: YSK

=== November 2015 ===
Abbr.	Party	Votes	%
AKP	Justice and Development Party	256,886	68.7%
CHP	Republican People's Party	55,227	14.8%
MHP	Nationalist Movement Party	44,260	11.8%
HDP	Peoples' Democratic Party	3,388	0.9%
SP	Felicity Party	3,177	0.8%
	Other	11,022	2.9%
Total		373,960	
Turnout		86.99	
source: YSK

=== 2018 ===
Abbr.	Party	Votes	%
AKP	Justice and Development Party	213,446	53.7%
MHP	Nationalist Movement Party	75,405	19%
CHP	Republican People's Party	59,813	15.1%
IYI	Good Party	27,292	6.9%
HDP	Peoples' Democratic Party	6,863	1.7%
SP	Felicity Party	7,052	1.8%
	Other	7,162	1.8%
Total		397,033	
Turnout		89.83	
source: YSK

== Presidential elections ==
=== 2014 ===
Presidential Election 2014: Sivas
Party	Candidate	Votes	%
AK Party	Recep Tayyip Erdoğan	246,868	69.99
Independent	Ekmeleddin İhsanoğlu	101,578	28.80
HDP	Selahattin Demirtaş	4,297	1.22
Total votes		352,743	100.00
Rejected ballots		7,911	2.19
Turnout		360,654	81.17
Recep Tayyip Erdoğan win			
