= Mustafa Kamalak =

Turkish politician (born 1948)

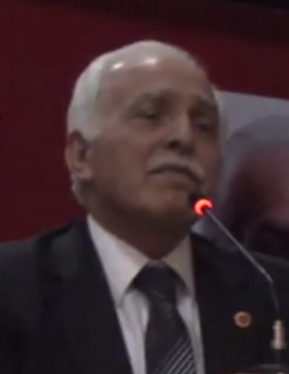

Leader of the Felicity Party
- In office 5 March 2011 – 30 October 2016
- Preceded by: Necmettin Erbakan
- Succeeded by: Temel Karamollaoğlu

Personal details
- Born: August 1, 1948 (age 77) Kahramanmaraş, Turkey

Mustafa Kamalak (born 1948 in Kahramanmaraş) is a Turkish politician and was the leader of the Felicity Party from March 2011 to October 2016. He graduated from Ankara University. He is married and the father of 2 children.

Party political offices
Preceded by Necmettin Erbakan	Leader of Felicity Party; March 5, 2011 – October 30, 2016	Succeeded by Temel Karamollaoğlu
