= Temel Karamollaoğlu =

Turkish politician

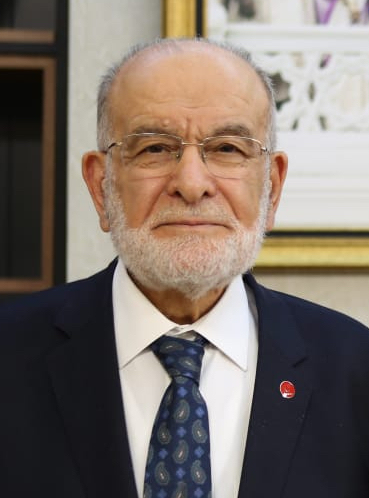

Leader of the Felicity Party
- In office 30 October 2016 – 27 November 2024
- Preceded by: Mustafa Kamalak
- Succeeded by: Mahmut Arıkan

Member of the Grand National Assembly
- In office 8 January 1996 – 3 November 2002
- In office 5 June 1977 – 12 September 1980
- Constituency: Sivas

Mayor of Sivas
- In office 26 March 1989 – 24 December 1995
- Preceded by: Bekir Timurboğa
- Succeeded by: Osman Seçilmiş

Personal details
- Born: 20 September 1941 (age 85) Kahramanmaraş, Turkey
- Party: Current: Felicity Party (2001-present); Previous: National Salvation Party (1977-1980); Welfare Party (1987-1998); Virtue Party (1998-2001)
- Spouse: Ayşe Yasemin Karamollaoğlu (m. 1965)
- Children: 5
- Education: University of Manchester
- Profession: Politician

Temel Karamollaoğlu (born 20 September 1941) is a Turkish textile engineer and politician. A prominent Islamist, Karamollaoğlu was the Mayor of Sivas from 1989 to 1995 and served twice as a Member of Parliament for Sivas from 1977 to 1980 and from 1996 to 2002.

== Early life and career ==
Temel Karamollaoğlu, originally from Gürün, a district of Sivas, was born on 7 June 1941 in Kahramanmaraş as one of the seven children of Üzeyir and Münire Karamollaoğlu. After completing his primary and secondary education in various provinces due to his father's duty as a teacher, he graduated from University of Manchester Institute of Science and Technology textile technology department in 1964, where he went on a scholarship in the 1960s. He completed his master's degree at the same university in 1967. In the same year he returned to Turkey and began working for Sümerbank, and then as a textile specialist in the State Planning Organization. Karamollaoğlu, who worked in the private sector for two years after his military service, served as the Incentive and Implementation General Manager of the Ministry of Industry and Technology in 1975.

== Political life ==
Karamollaoğlu met Necmettin Erbakan in 1967. They met in a talk held by Mehmed Zahid Kotku in a İskenderpaşa Sufi Order meeting. In 1977, he was elected as a deputy of Sivas from Erbakan's National Salvation Party and he was, one year later, elected as a member of the party general assembly in 1978. He served European Council Assembly.

After the 1980 Turkish coup d'état, he was prosecuted by the military government, but eventually acquitted. He remained out of active politics, where he worked as a private consultant for a while and then held administrative positions in a textile company. He was allowed to return after the passage of the 1987 Turkish constitutional referendum. He ran as a member of parliament under the Welfare Party in the 1987 general election, but the party did not win representation for polling below the 10% threshold.

He was elected mayor of Sivas in 1989. Aziz Nesin's presentation of his Turkish translation of The Satanic Verses in Madımak Hotel in Sivas was controversial, and a mob started a fire which killed many of the guests in attendance, most of whom were Alevi. Karamollaoğlu's role in the Madımak Massacre is controversial, some claimed he urged the mob to disperse, other accounts allege that he endorsed their cause. The government removed him from his post, but he was reelected mayor in 1994.

He entered the parliament after the 1995 Turkish general election as a deputy of Sivas of the Welfare Party. During this period, he served as a member of the NATO Parliamentary Assembly. At the same time, he was elected as the Welfare Party group vice president. He continued this duty until the Welfare Party was shut down. Following investigations of the Refah-Yol government, Karamollaoğlu’s brother and other officials at the state-run fertilizer firm TÜGSAŞ were prosecuted for siphoning off $20 million in gas. It was also discovered that he is affiliated with the controversial Aczmendi Sufi Order.

Later, he joined the Virtue Party after the Welfare Party was dissolved by the Constitutional Court. He was re-elected as a deputy of Sivas in the 1999 Turkish general election, during which the Virtue Party was also banned. He was a member of the "White Beard" faction, the orthodox Milli Görüş politicians that opposed the reformist "Innovators", led by Recep Tayyip Erdoğan. The White Beards formed the Felicity Party (SP), while the Innovators formed the Justice and Development Party (AK Party). At the Felicity Party congress held in May 2000, Karamollaoğlu was elected as a member of the general administrative board and was appointed as the vice president responsible for foreign affairs.

Karamollaoğlu was elected as leader of the Felicity Party in 2016 and handed over the position of leader of the Felicity Party to Mahmut Arıkan, who was elected as leader of the Felicity Party in 2024.

== Personal life ==
Karamollaoğlu speaks fluent English. He has been married since 1965 and has 5 children.

Party political offices
Preceded by Mustafa Kamalak	Leader of Felicity Party; October 30, 2016 – present	Succeeded by incumbent
