= Nation Alliance (Turkey) =

Turkish big-tent electoral alliance

Nation Alliance Millet İttifakı
- Leader: Collective leadership (Table of Six)
- Presidential candidate: Kemal Kılıçdaroğlu
- Founded: 5 May 2018
- Dissolved: 28 May 2023
- Ideology: Strengthened parliamentary system (ideologies vary by party)
- Political position: Big tent
- Members: CHP; İYİ; DEVA; GP; SAADET; DP
- Slogan: Birleşe birleşe kazanacağız! ('United we will win!')

Website
- https://milletittifaki.biz

The Nation Alliance (Turkish: Millet İttifakı), abbreviated as NATION (Turkish: MİLLET), was an electoral and political alliance in Turkey, made up of six opposition parties to contest the 2023 Turkish general election against its main rival, the People's Alliance. Originally established prior to the country's 2018 general election, the alliance had consisted of four opposition parties across the political spectrum, which had found common ground on withstanding Turkey's newly established presidential system. The alliance dissolved on 1 June 2023 following its narrow defeat in the 2023 elections, after the Good Party's announcement that they were no longer a part of it.

Although Nation had become inactive as a bloc following their defeat in 2018; the Republican People's Party (CHP) and the Good Party (İYİ) restored the alliance for the 2019 local elections, which delivered the opposition their first major electoral successes in years. The alliance enlarged, welcoming two breakaway parties from the ruling Justice and Development Party (AKP); namely the Future Party (GP) and Democracy and Progress Party (DEVA). Shortly after the enlargement, Nation Alliance announced its prospective government platform, becoming the first political entity in Turkey to do so prior to an election.

Generally, the platform puts a particular emphasis on establishing a strengthened parliamentary system; reversing the current trend of democratic backsliding, reinstating rule of law and separation of powers, as well as improving Turkey's human rights record.

The Nation Alliance of 2018, nominated their individual candidates for the presidency, and the alliance had more of an electoral focus than a political one, interconnecting parties with vaguely defined precepts. The alliance of 2023 strived to act with consensus; laying the groundwork of a potential democratic transition in post-Erdoğan Turkey.

The Nation Alliance disbanded itself after it failed to win the 2023 general election.

== History and background ==
=== 2017 constitutional referendum ===
A constitutional referendum was held in April 2017, which transformed the political system of Turkey from a parliamentary into a presidential one. The reforms were championed by the ruling Justice and Development Party (AKP) and the smaller oppositional Nationalist Movement Party (MHP).

The constitutional referendum ultimately passed with a narrow margin of 2-3% on an 85% voter turnout. Meanwhile, the main opposition Republican People's Party (CHP), along with MHP now-dissidents such as Meral Akşener who would go onto establish the Good Party (İYİ), voiced strong opposition to the constitutional amendments which were deemed undemocratic, autocratic and seen as a threat to rule of law, democracy and separation of powers within the country.

The alliance had brought together many groups with differing ideologies that had campaigned for a "No" vote against the transition into a presidential system during the referendum, and those who were already in opposition to the government of President Recep Tayyip Erdoğan under a common and unifying banner. As a result; the alliance's supportive bases were viewed as being spread out across many differing political views and ideologies, though unifying under an opposition to Erdoğan and support of a strengthened parliamentary system.

=== 2018 elections and 2019 local election ===
When the new AKP-MHP government legalized the formation of pre-election alliances in order to contest the 2018 elections together, which was previously limited, speculation arose over the possibility of opposition groups also establishing an alliance. After several sets of talks, the CHP announced on 1 May 2018 the formation of its alliance with Akşener's new Good Party, as well as with the extraparliamentary Felicity and Democrat parties. In order for the Good Party to compete in the election more effectively the CHP transferred 15 of its MPs to the new party so it could have a parliamentary group. Smaller transfers took place with the other two parties within the alliance, again as political support before the 2018 elections took place.

During the 2018 elections, these constituent parties of the alliance contested under a common banner for the parliamentary election, while for the presidential election each individual party nominated its own candidate, though the parties stated beforehand that they would support the leading opposition presidential candidate; Muharrem İnce, if the 2018 presidential election was proponed for a head-to-head second round.

On 4 July, following the alliance winning 189 seats out of the 600 seats in the Grand National Assembly, the Good Party General Secretary Aytun Çıray announced that the Nation Alliance at that point had been partially dissolved, citing the lack of a need for a post-election alliance. In response, the CHP's spokesperson Bülent Tezcan expressed that the electoral alliance was no longer technically necessary, but that the unity of the member alliance parties under and in-supporting of a joint set of democratic fundamental values such as separation of powers, parliamentarianism, rule of law and human rights within Turkey were necessary and as such would continue.

Though, during the 2019 local elections the alliance came together once again with prominence and achieved overwhelming success, such as winning 6 out of the 7 largest mayoral municipalities, one being İstanbul which had been under the rule of conservative parties for over 20 years, as well as the capital Ankara.

After these results, the electoral alliance this time took a less-temporary lasting stance as an electoral alliance, instead being a big tent political alliance, aiming to unify the dissident Turkish population until the future 2023-24 elections and possibly establish ground for a coalition government in the future.

=== The Table of Six and 2023 elections ===
The Nation Alliance held a diverse section of the Turkish electorate. Though the secularist, Kemalist CHP is the de facto leader of the alliance, and analysts believed the party managed to make inroads with more religious, Kurdish, and socially conservative electorate. The inclusion of the Islamist SAADET and the AKP-splinters DEVA and Future Parties, as well as the big-tent approach espoused by the CHP leader Kemal Kılıçdaroğlu have been perceived as influential for this shift. These developments saw the alliance gain popularity in opinion polls and electoral projections conducted between mid-2021 and 2022 indicating that the alliance would become the largest political force in the country, with a possible majority in parliament following the 2023 elections.

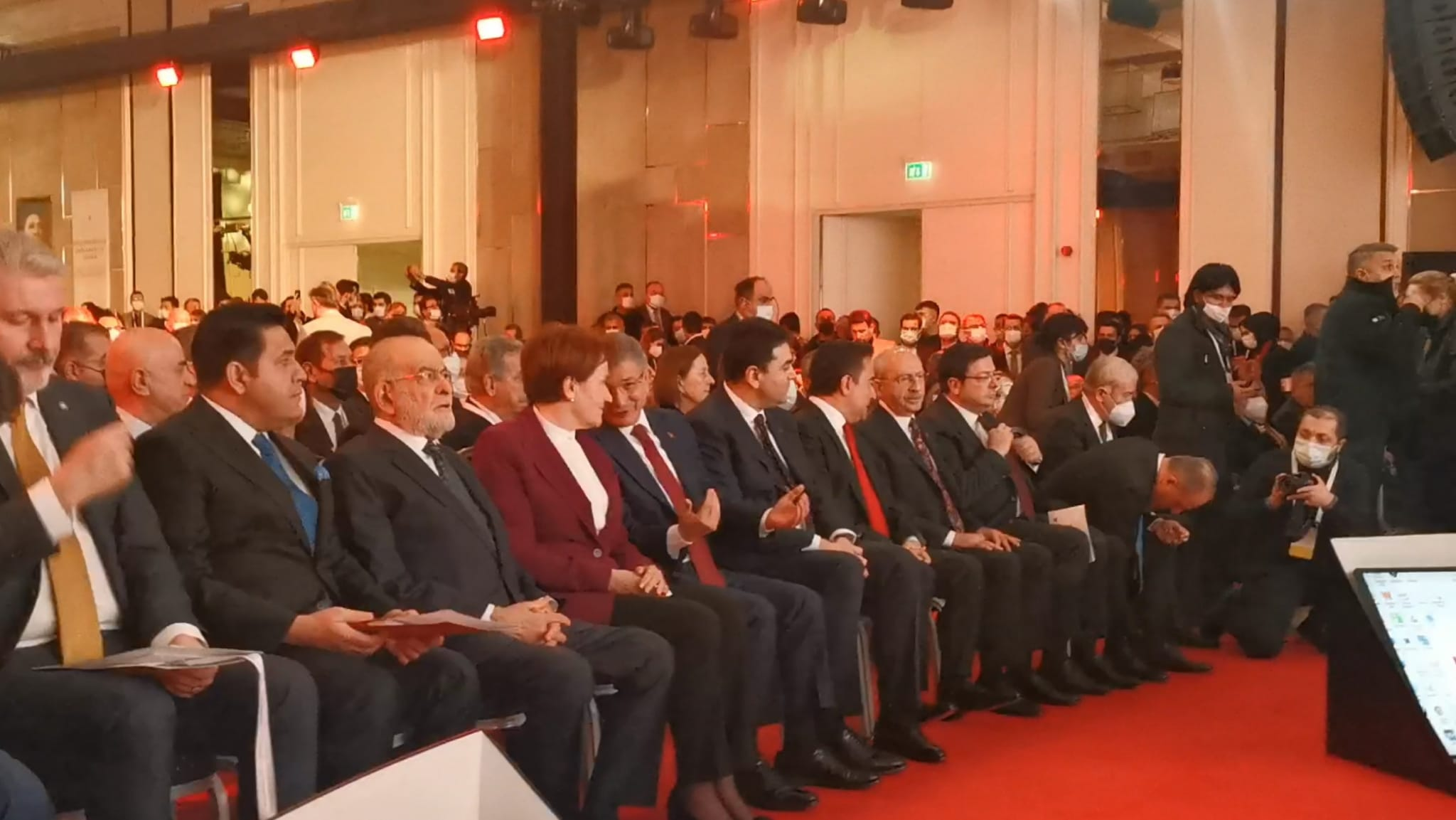
Table of Six leaders during one of the “Enhanced and Strengthened Parliamentary System” meetings.

From 2019 to 2023, İYİ, CHP, SP, DP, as well as DEVA and GP met as the Table of Six (Turkish: Altılı Masa) to formulate a post Erdoğan government. This would include a "enhanced and strengthened" parliamentary system modeled after other parliamentary European democracies, being deemed more democratic and stable from the previous parliamentary system of Turkey, including potentially a new constitution. In the text of the memorandum, lowering the electoral threshold to 3%, treasury aid to the parties that received at least 1% of the votes, ending the omnibus law practice, removing the veto power of the president and extending his term of office to 7 years, recognising the authority to issue a no-confidence question on the government, human rights and human rights in the education curriculum. There were promises such as the addition of gender equality courses. The Nation Alliance shared the Common Policies Memorandum of Understanding with the public in Ankara on 30 January 2023.

The first meeting was held on 12 February 2022. The six-table members of the political parties signed a memorandum of understanding by issuing a declaration for the transition to the strengthened parliamentary system on 28 February 2022.

The Peoples Democratic Party (HDP) did not take part in the union and declared that it was not interested in taking part in it. The statement came after Gürsel Tekin from the CHP suggested the bloc could grant the HDP a ministry in case they won the elections in 2023, which was blocked by politicians of the İYİ party.

On 3 March 2023, İYİ leader Meral Akşener announced that she took the decision to withdraw from the Table of Six and the Nation Alliance, and said her party would not support main opposition CHP leader Kemal Kılıçdaroğlu as the joint candidate in the 2023 Turkish presidential election. However, on 6 March, she and her party rejoined the Table of Six after intense public criticism and after it was announced that Ekrem İmamoğlu and Mansur Yavaş would be appointed vice-presidents if Kılıçdaroğlu wins the presidential election.

After rival People's Alliance won both the parliamentary majority and the presidency in elections held on 14 May 2023 and 28 May 2023, Good Party secretary general Uğur Poyraz stated that the alliance existed for purpose of succeeding in the election, and is now dissolved as the election is over.

== Goals and views ==
The Nation Alliance sought to transform Turkey's presidential system back into a newly modeled parliamentary system, and to establish a new constitution that guaranteed separation of powers, rule of law, democracy and human rights such as freedom of speech within the country, which all are considered to have been under significant suppression ever since the AKP took power in 2003. The parties within the alliance all have separate manifestos, economic recovery plans, proposed projects and diplomatic approaches, though still generally work collaboratively on issues regarding most of these fields.

=== Stance on the European Union & accession ===
The alliance stood in-favor of greater European integration and EU membership in a whole, thus also aiming to comply with the Copenhagen criteria for Turkey's accession into the European union-partnership. Turkey's candidate status, and accession process has been halted since 2018.

=== Stance on NATO ===
Although the alliance supported Turkey's position within NATO, it also supported the country's mediating and non-belligerent stance in the Russo-Ukrainian War, and believed that Turkey should be reintegrated into the F-35 program while making use of the defensive weapons (such as the S-400) bought from and provided by Russia. The parties occasionally criticized the support of some allied NATO member-states for the PKK, YPG and other armed militant groups in-conflict with the country.

Unlike rest of the members, the Felicity Party is known for being the most critical towards Western countries and NATO, Temel Karamollaoğlu harshly criticized American government on many occasions, condemning assassination of Qasem Soleimani and declaring him an Islamic martyr.

== Membership ==
=== Members and political affiliations ===
Party		Leader	Position	MPs (Grand National Assembly)
CHP	Republican People's Party (Cumhuriyet Halk Partisi)	Kemal Kılıçdaroğlu	Centre-left	130 / 600
İYİ	Good Party (İYİ Parti)	Meral Akşener	Centre-right to right-wing	43 / 600
DEVA	Democracy and Progress Party (Demokrasi ve Atılım Partisi)	Ali Babacan	Centre-right	15 / 600
SAADET	Felicity Party (Saadet Partisi)	Temel Karamollaoğlu	Right-wing to far-right	10 / 600
GP	Future Party (Gelecek Partisi)	Ahmet Davutoğlu	Centre-right to right-wing	10 / 600
DP	Democrat Party (Demokrat Parti)	Gültekin Uysal	Centre-right	3 / 600

=== Parties providing support for the 2023 presidential election ===
Party		Leader	Position	MPs (Grand National Assembly)
BTP	Independent Turkey Party	Hüseyin Baş	Centre	0 / 600
TKP	Communist Party of Turkey	Kemal Okuyan	Far-left	0 / 600
HKP	People's Liberation Party	Nurullah Ankut	Far-left	0 / 600
TİP	Workers' Party of Turkey	Erkan Baş	Left-wing to far-left	4 / 600
TDP	Party for Change in Turkey	Mustafa Sarıgül	Centre	1 / 600
LDP	Liberal Democratic Party	Gültekin Tırpancı	Centre to centre-right	0 / 600
DOĞRU	True Party	Rifat Serdaroğlu	Centre to centre-right	0 / 600
ZP	Victory Party (runoff only)	Ümit Özdağ	Right-wing to far-right	0 / 600

=== Support during the 2018–2023 elections ===
In 2018, the presidential candidate of the alliance's largest party CHP, Muharrem İnce, was supported by minor parties such as the national-conservative Homeland Party (YP), liberal ANAP (Motherland) alongside the feminist KP (Women's Party) and 8 more minor parties, while Meral Akşener's candidacy was supported by that of the DSP and DYP.

The third largest opposition party, pro-Kurdish People's Democratic Party (HDP) supported the Nation Alliance in many provinces during the 2019 local elections, most significantly during re-run of the Istanbul local election, though took it a generally neutral stance for the elections throughout this period. The party collaborated with the Nation Alliance's mayoral candidates in many cities, but still put out many of its own candidates in other parts of country.

The HDP formed its own electoral alliance with other left-wing parties in mid-2022, the Labour and Freedom Alliance (Turkish: Emek ve Özgürlük İttifakı) which competed separately for the parliamentary election, but supported the Nation Alliance's joint candidate (Kemal Kılıçdaroğlu) in the 2023 presidential election.

The Victory Party supported Kılıçdaroğlu's candidacy in the second round of voting in the 2023 presidential election.

== Electoral history ==
=== Presidential elections ===
Election	Candidate(s)	Party	Votes	%	Outcome
2018	Muharrem İnce	Republican People's Party	15,340,321	30.64%	2nd
2018	Meral Akşener	Good Party	3,649,030	7.29%	4th
2018	Temel Karamollaoğlu	Felicity Party	443,704	0.89%	5th
2023	Kemal Kılıçdaroğlu	Republican People's Party	25,432,951	47.82%	2nd

=== Parliamentary elections ===
Election	Parties	Total alliance votes			Total alliance seats		Position	Map
Election	Parties	#	%	Rank	#	±	Position	Map
June 2018	Democrat Party; Felicity Party; Good Party; Republican People's Party	17,019,808	33.95%	2nd	189 / 600	47▲	Opposition	
May 2023	Democracy and Progress Party; Democrat Party; Future Party; Felicity Party; Good Party; Republican People's Party	19,063,781	35.04%	2nd	212 / 600	23▲	Opposition	

=== Local elections ===
Election	Parties	Total number of allied votes (Mayoral)	% of allied votes	Number of allied municipalities	Number of allied councillors	Map
March 2019	Good Party; Republican People's Party	17,443,229	37.57%	265 / 1,335	5,705 / 20,745	

==== Re-runs ====
Election	Candidate	Party	Votes	%	Outcome	Map
June 2019	Ekrem İmamoğlu	Republican People's Party	4,742,082	54.22%	1st	
