= Felicity Party =

Ultraconservative political party in Turkey

Felicity Party Saadet Partisi
- Abbreviation: SAADET (official); SP (unofficial)
- Leader: Mahmut Arıkan
- General Secretary: Mesut Doğan
- Spokesperson: Birol Aydın
- Founder: Necmettin Erbakan; Recai Kutan
- Founded: 20 July 2001
- Split from: Virtue Party
- Headquarters: Ziyabey Cad. 2. Sk. No: 15, Altındağ, Ankara, Turkey
- Newspaper: Millî Gazete
- Youth wing: Genç Saadet
- Women's wing: Saadet Kadın Kolları
- Membership (2026): ▲374,724
- Ideology: Islamism; Conservatism; Religious conservatism Religious nationalism Millî Görüş
- Political position: Right-wing to far-right
- Religion: Sunni Islam
- National affiliation: Nation Alliance (2018–2023); Felicity and Future Alliance (2023–2025); New Path (2025–present)
- Colours: Red (official); Hot pink (customary)
- Grand National Assembly: 1 / 600
- District municipalities: 1 / 922
- Belde Municipalities: 3 / 388
- Municipal Assemblies: 72 / 20,952

Party flag

Website
- saadet.org.tr

The Felicity Party (Turkish: Saadet Partisi, SAADET) is an Islamist political party in Turkey. It was founded in 2001, and is mainly supported by conservative Muslims in Turkey. The Felicity Party is among the anti-Erdoğanist parties in Turkey, and accuses Erdogan of being a dictator and undermining democracy.

It was founded on 20 July 2001 after the Virtue Party (FP) was banned by the Constitutional Court. While the party's reformist wing formed the Justice and Development Party (AKP), the hardliners founded the Felicity Party. Although an Islamist party, its policy platform covers the whole span of political issues in Turkey.

The Felicity Party's vote has been weakened by the success of the moderately Islamist AKP government. It has repeatedly condemned the Turkish government's aspiration to join the European Union, and relationship with Israel and the United States. It has argued that Turkey must adapt its military and foreign policy stance to meet what it argues are increasing threats coming from the West to all Islamic countries. The Party's platform is based on Necmettin Erbakan's ideas and philosophy, known as Millî Görüş.

== History ==
The Felicity Party has not been particularly successful electorally, polling just 2.5% of the vote in the 2002 general elections, thereby failing to pass the 10% threshold necessary to gain representation in the Turkish Grand National Assembly. It was slightly more successful in the local elections of 29 March 2004, winning 4.1% of the vote and a number of mayoralties, although none of any particular significance. In the 2011 election they were reduced to 1.24% on the vote. During the period, Recai Kutan (20 July 2001 – 11 May 2003 and again 30 January 2004 – 29 March 2008), Necmettin Erbakan (11 May 2003 – 30 January 2004 and again from 17 October 2010 till his death on 27 February 2011) and Numan Kurtulmuş (26 October 2008 – 1 October 2010) were leaders. In June 2015 elections it won 2.06% of the votes.

=== National Alliance ===
In preparation for the June 2015 general election, the Felicity Party stated that it was open to negotiate an electoral alliance with other parties such as the Great Union Party (BBP) and the larger Nationalist Movement Party (MHP). Although the MHP later announced that it was not willing to form an electoral alliance, the Felicity Party (SP) and BBP agreed upon a new alliance in order to increase their chances of surpassing the election threshold of 10% to gain representation in Parliament. The new alliance was named the National Alliance (Millî İttifak).

The Nation and Justice Party (MİLAD) also expressed their intention to join the alliance, but when they were given top spots on the candidate lists in only 4 electoral districts, MİLAD withdrew and was unable to contest the election for not sending their own party lists to the Supreme Electoral Council on time.

The candidate lists were drawn up such that BBP candidates were placed top in electoral districts in which they won more votes than the SP in 2011, while SP candidates were placed top in provinces in which the SP had beaten the BBP in 2011. This meant that an SP candidate was placed first in 55 provinces, while a BBP candidate was placed first in 30. The remaining positions subsequently alternated between SP and BBP candidates. SP leader Mustafa Kamalak was selected as the first candidate for İstanbul's 1st electoral district while BBP leader Mustafa Destici was selected as the first candidate for Ankara's 2nd electoral district.

=== Nation Alliance ===
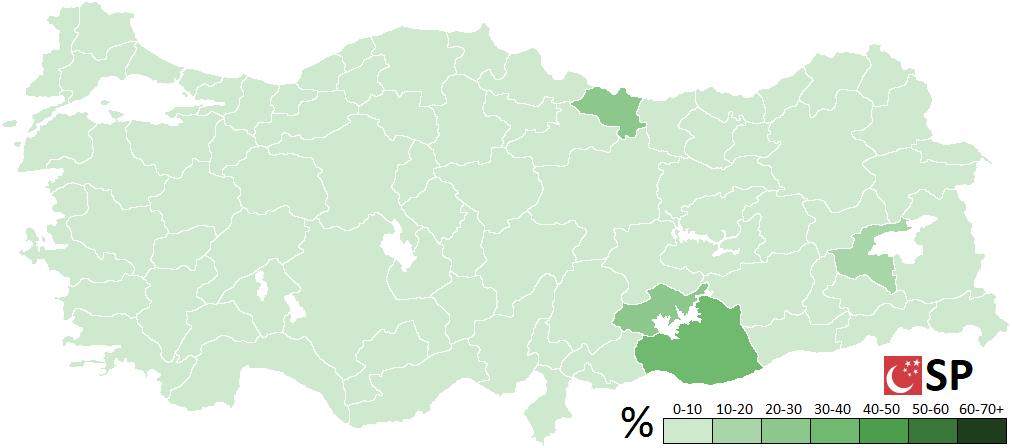
Felicity Party's vote distribution in 2019 local elections

The party participated in the Nation Alliance in the 2018 general elections with the Republican People's Party (CHP), Good Party (İYİ), and Democrat Party (DP).

In 2022, the party took part in the establishment of the Table of Six. It received 10 deputies from CHP's list in the 2023 parliamentary election, and supported Kemal Kılıçdaroğlu's candidacy in the 2023 presidential election.

=== Since 2023 ===
On July 6, 2023, SP and the Future Party formed a parliamentary group under SP's banner, and competed in the 2024 local election in an electoral alliance. Saadet received 1.09%, and Gelecek 0.07%, of the electorate.

== Political positions ==
The Felicity Party works both as a political party and a social organization. It has party branches in many districts, small towns and cities in the country.

In the past, it has organized demonstrations on a wide range of issues, often involving tens of thousands of participants. Thousands of protesters joined SP organized demonstrations against the 2004 attack on Fallujah, against the cartoons of Muhammad in newspapers around the world, and Israel's invasion of Gaza during the 2008–2009 Israel–Gaza conflict. SP has criticized the Trump administration over attacks against Iranian forces, and condemned both the assassination of Jamal Khashoggi and the assassination of Qasem Soleimani.

SP has been accused by Arab and pro-government commentators of pursuing pro-Iranian views due to former SP leader Mustafa Kamalak's comments and visits to Iran.

== Party leaders ==
#	Leader (Birth–Death)	Portrait	Took office	Left office
1	Recai Kutan (1930–2024)		20 July 2001	11 May 2003
2	Necmettin Erbakan (1926–2011)		11 May 2003	30 January 2004
(1)	Recai Kutan (1930–2024)		8 April 2006 (acting from 30 January 2004)	26 October 2008
3	Numan Kurtulmuş (1959–)		26 October 2008	17 October 2010
(2)	Necmettin Erbakan (1926–2011)		17 October 2010	27 February 2011
4	Mustafa Kamalak (1948–)		5 March 2011	30 October 2016
5	Temel Karamollaoğlu (1941–)		30 October 2016	27 November 2024
6	Mahmut Arıkan (1977–)		27 November 2024	Incumbent

== Election results ==
=== Parliamentary elections ===
Grand National Assembly of Turkey
Year	Leader	Votes	%	Seats	+/-	Position
2002	Recai Kutan	785,489	2.49 (#8)	0 / 550		Extra-parliamentary
2007	Recai Kutan	820,289	2.34 (#6)	0 / 550	0	Extra-parliamentary
2011	Mustafa Kamalak	543,454	1.27 (#4)	0 / 550	0	Extra-parliamentary
June 2015	Mustafa Kamalak	949,178	2.06 (#5)	0 / 550	0	Extra-parliamentary
November 2015	Mustafa Kamalak	325,978	0.68 (#5)	0 / 550	0	Extra-parliamentary
2018	Temel Karamollaoğlu	672,139	1.34 (#6)	2 / 600 (Note: 2 deputies elected on CHP list)	▲2	Opposition
2023	Temel Karamollaoğlu	Ran on CHP list		10 / 600	▲8	Opposition

== See also ==
- List of Islamic political parties
