= Ali Babacan =

Turkish politician (born 1967)

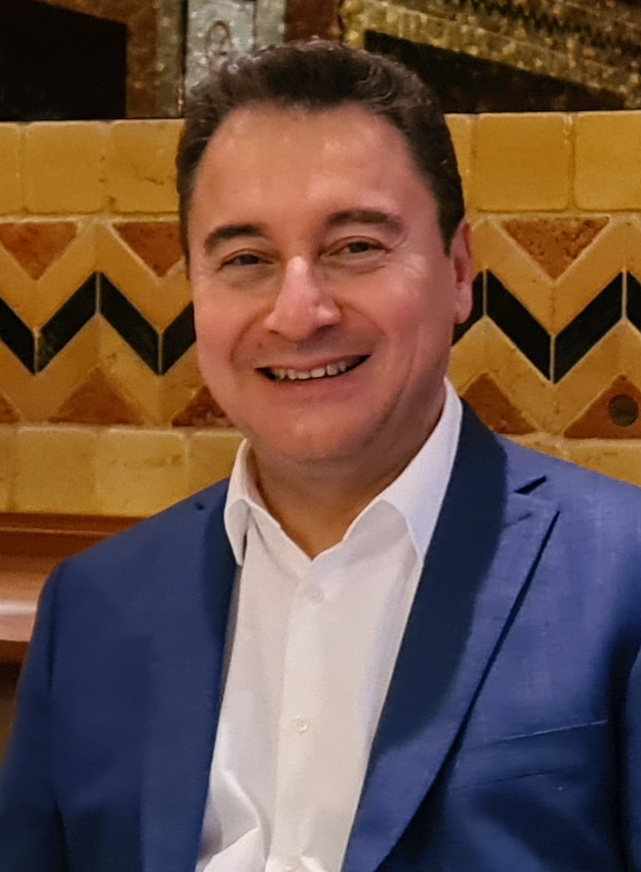

Leader of the Democracy and Progress Party
- Incumbent
- Assumed office 10 March 2020
- Preceded by: Position established

Deputy Prime Minister of Turkey
- In office 1 May 2009 – 28 August 2015
- Prime Minister: Recep Tayyip Erdoğan; Ahmet Davutoğlu
- Serving with: Bülent Arınç; Beşir Atalay; Bekir Bozdağ; Emrullah İşler; Yalçın Akdoğan; Numan Kurtulmuş
- Preceded by: Nazım Ekren
- Succeeded by: Cevdet Yılmaz

Minister of Foreign Affairs
- In office 29 August 2007 – 1 May 2009
- Prime Minister: Recep Tayyip Erdoğan
- Preceded by: Abdullah Gül
- Succeeded by: Ahmet Davutoğlu

Chief Negotiator for Turkish Accession to the European Union
- In office 17 January 2005 – 11 January 2009
- Prime Minister: Recep Tayyip Erdoğan
- Preceded by: Position established
- Succeeded by: Egemen Bağış

Minister of State Responsible for Economy
- In office 18 November 2002 – 29 August 2007
- Prime Minister: Abdullah Gül; Recep Tayyip Erdoğan
- Preceded by: Masum Türker
- Succeeded by: Mehmet Şimşek

Member of the Grand National Assembly
- In office 17 November 2015 – 16 May 2018
- Constituency: Ankara (I) (Nov 2015)
- In office 14 November 2002 – 23 April 2015
- Constituency: Ankara (I) (2002, 2007, 2011)

Personal details
- Born: 4 April 1967 (age 59) Ankara, Turkey
- Party: Justice and Development Party (2001–2019); Democracy and Progress Party (2020–present)
- Spouse: Ülkü Zeynep Yurter (m. 1995)
- Children: 3
- Education: TED Ankara College
- Alma mater: Middle East Technical University (BS); Northwestern University (MBA)
- Occupation: Politician; economist; engineer
- Website: alibabacan.com.tr

Ali Babacan (Turkish pronunciation: [aˈli babaˈdʒan]; born 4 April 1967) is a Turkish politician, economist, and engineer. He is the founder and current leader of the Democracy and Progress Party (DEVA). He served 13 years as the Minister of Foreign Affairs, Minister of Economy, Chief Negotiator for the EU and Deputy Prime Minister of Turkey from 2002 to 2015. He was a member of the parliament as well.

He first served as the Minister of State in charge of economic affairs in the 58th cabinet from the Justice and Development Party (AKP). He retained this position throughout the 58th and 59th Governments of the Republic of Turkey. On 29 August 2007 he was appointed as the Minister of Foreign Affairs of the 60th Government of the Republic of Turkey. During 2009–2015, he served as the Deputy Prime Minister for Economic and Financial Affairs of Turkey.

Ali Babacan had the duty of steering a harsh economic reform program, which was backed by multibillion-dollar IMF loans; under his leadership, the Turkish economy achieved a remarkable recovery after two severe crises. He mostly stayed away from the Turkish political arena and focused on economic reforms, acting more like a technocrat.

In 2019, Babacan left the AKP, citing "deep differences" over the party's direction as a reason, and founded the Democracy and Progress Party (DEVA) in 2020. DEVA eventually joined the Nation Alliance, opposing AKP and Turkish president Erdoğan.

== Early life and career ==
=== Education ===
Ali Babacan graduated from TED Ankara College ranking first among the class of 1985. He attended the Middle East Technical University (METU) in Ankara and in 1989 was awarded a BSc in Industrial Engineering with the highest marks (4.00 point out of 4.00).

Babacan went to the U.S. on a Fulbright Scholarship to do postgraduate studies and in 1992 received an MBA from the Kellogg School of Management at Northwestern University in Evanston, Illinois, with majors in marketing, organizational behavior and international business.

=== Career in finance ===
Babacan worked then for two years as an associate at QRM, Inc. in Chicago, Illinois, a company doing financial consulting to the top executives of major banks in the United States. He returned to Turkey in 1994 and, served as chief advisor to the mayor of Ankara the same year. He was the chairman of his family owned textile company between 1994 and 2002.

== Political life ==
=== Ministry of Foreign Affairs & Economy (2002–2015) ===
He entered politics in 2001 as a co-founder and a board member of the Justice and Development Party and was elected to parliament as deputy for Ankara on 3 November 2002. He was appointed Minister of Economy on 18 November 2002 and became the youngest member of the cabinet, then at the age of 35.

On 24 May 2005 Prime Minister Recep Tayyip Erdoğan announced his appointment as chief negotiator in Turkey's accession talks with the European Union, which started on 3 October 2005. As government minister Babacan attended several international meetings including the World Economic Forum in Davos, Switzerland, and the Bilderberg Group.

In 2019, Babacan left the ruling AKP, citing "deep differences" over the party's direction as a reason.

=== Leader of the DEVA (2020–present) ===
Babacan confirmed his intent to form this party in a late 2019 interview with journalist Şirin Payzın of T24, and expects his party to be a "mainstream party" with particular focuses on minority rights, a return to Turkey's parliamentary system, fair processes in courts and legislation, and restoring freedom of speech and expression. Babacan is quoted as saying that "the nation will give our party its name".

On 9 March 2020, he founded Democracy and Progress Party, abbreviated as "DEVA" or "remedy" in Turkish. The DEVA Party held its first meeting of the Board of Founders on 10 March 2020, where he was unanimously elected chairman.

== Personal life ==
Babacan is married and has three children. He also speaks English.

Political offices
Preceded by Masum Türker	Minister of Economic Affairs; 2002–2007	Succeeded by Mehmet Şimşek
Preceded by Abdullah Gül	Minister of Foreign Affairs; 2007–2009	Succeeded by Ahmet Davutoğlu
Preceded by Nazım Ekren	Second Deputy Prime Minister of Turkey; 2007–2015	Succeeded by Cevdet Yılmaz
