= Future Party (Turkey) =

Conservative political party in Turkey

Future Party Gelecek Partisi
- Abbreviation: Gelecek Partisi (official); GP (unofficial)
- Leader: Ahmet Davutoğlu
- Founder: Ahmet Davutoğlu
- Founded: 12 December 2019
- Dissolved: 22 August 2026
- Split from: Justice and Development Party
- Membership (2026): ▼60,494
- Ideology: Conservatism; Liberal conservatism; Conservative liberalism; Economic liberalism; Pro-Europeanism
- Political position: Centre-right to right-wing
- National affiliation: Table of Six (2022–2023); Nation Alliance (2023); Felicity and Future Alliance (2023–2025); New Path (2025–2026)
- Colors: Green, Dark green, White (official); Lime green (customary)
- Slogan: Bizim bir Geleceğimiz var ('We have a Future')

Website
- gelecekpartisi.org.tr

The Future Party (Turkish: Gelecek Partisi, GP) was a political party operating in Turkey, founded on 12 December 2019, under the leadership of Ahmet Davutoğlu. According to the party's bylaws, its official abbreviation was "Future Party." Its symbol was a sycamore leaf. It had three members in the Turkish Grand National Assembly just before the closure announcement. However, due to joint group efforts, all three were members of Yeni Yol. Its leader was Ahmet Davutoğlu, from the foundation in 2019 to closure of the party in 2026.

The party supports the strengthened parliamentary system proposed by the country's opposition parties.

== History ==
=== Formation ===
The Future Party was founded on 12 December 2019 by Ahmet Davutoğlu, a former foreign minister and prime minister on behalf of the conservative Justice and Development Party (AKP). Having been elected prime minister on 28 August 2014 with the support of President Recep Tayyip Erdoğan, Davutoğlu later opposed the latter's moves to transform Turkey's form of government from a parliamentary to a presidential system. His conflict with Erdoğan culminated in Davutoğlu's resignation from the premiership, effective from 22 May 2016.

Following his resignation, Davutoğlu frequently criticized the AKP government, which led the party to launch disciplinary actions against him. In response, he resigned from the AKP on 13 September 2019. He later expressed interest in forming a new party in opposition to President Erdoğan's administration, and ultimately launched the Future Party on 12 December 2019. The new party immediately published a list of 154 founding members, which included numerous former AKP officials and affiliates.

The Future Party opened its headquarters building in Çankaya on July 26, 2020. In the statement made by Davutoğlu on April 2, 2021, he stated that the party was entitled to participate in the elections by the Supreme Election Council (YSK). Other notable founding members of the party include Mehmet Behçet Piker, who joined the party in 2019. Piker is a former vice president of Sabancı Holding and the father of the famous American Twitch streamer Hasan Piker.

=== Merger proposal with DEVA Party (2023) ===
When agreement on forming a group failed, DEVA Party and the Future Party considered a full merger to form a group, and the possibility of a co-chairmanship was discussed. However, DEVA Party Chairman Ali Babacan deemed the co-chairmanship unsuitable, stating that it "could lead to dual leadership and a confusion of messages within the party leadership, and would be unsustainable.

A party official who participated in the talks stated that the parties had considered "the possibility of a future merger by establishing an umbrella party in Parliament," but that this was not deemed feasible. It was also reported that the majority of DEVA Party organizations were unsympathetic to the idea of forming a group outside of the legal entity, and that discussions between the Felicity Party and the Future Party were ongoing, but had not yielded any results.

=== Establishing a joint group with the Felicity Party ===
On July 6, 2023, officials from the Felicity Party and the Future Party announced an agreement to establish a joint parliamentary group. Following the signing of a protocol titled "Felicity Party-Future Party Alliance," Future Party deputies Mustafa Nedim Yamalı, Serap Yazıcı Özbudun, Cemalettin Kani Torun, Sema Silkin Ün, Selim Temurci, İsa Mesih Şahin, Doğan Demir, Mustafa Bilici, Hasan Ekici, and Selçuk Özdağ resigned from their respective parties and joined the Felicity Party, enabling the Felicity Party to establish a parliamentary group. Selçuk Özdağ became the chairman of this new group.

=== Dissolution ===
On 29 July 2026, party leader Davutoğlu announced that the party would dissolve itself the following month. Saying in a follow up statement: “We have decided to withdraw from party politics and bring the Future Party’s political activities to an end, in order to avoid becoming part of the polluted political climate."

== Policies ==
Davutoğlu has stated that the new party would push for a new constitution, a return to a parliamentary system, and education in minority languages. Moreover, the manifesto of the party criticized the current lack of rights for the Kurdish minority.

== Board ==
#	Name	Mission
1	Ahmet Davutoğlu	Chairman
2	Ayhan Sefer Üstün	Deputy Chairman
3	Hasan Seymen	Secretary General
4	İzzettin Küçük	Head of Political Affairs and Internal Affairs
5	Ömer Ünal	Head of the Organization
6	Mustafa Gözel	Head of Civil Society and Public Relations
7	Ali Aydın	Head of Law and Justice Policies
8	Hasan Hüseyin Bozok	President of Local Governments
9	Rumi Bekiroğlu	Head of Election Affairs
10	Aynur Algül	Head of Family and Social Policies
11	Feridun Bilgin	Head of Economic Policies
12	Engin Keskinel	Minister of communications
13	Ümit Yardım	Director of Foreign Policy and Defense
14	Selami Çalışkan	Head of Informatics and R&D
15	Meryem Türktekin	President of Human, Nature and Environmental Rights
16	Abdullah Başçı	Head of Administrative and Financial Affairs
17	Yeşim Karadağ	Head of Women's Policies
18	Muhammed Mustafa Çakmakçı	Head of Youth Policies
19	Yusuf Ziya Özcan	Head of Education and Science Policies
20	Alptekin Hocaoğlu	Head of Health Policies
21	Burçak Başbuğ Erkan	Head of Food Safety and Agriculture
22	Can Cankesen	President of Labor and Social Security
23	Ferhat Esener	President of Industry and Technology
24	Alaattin Fırat	Head of Commerce
25	Haydar Çiftçi	President of Urbanization
26	Mehmet Bekhan	Head of Culture and Tourism Policies
27	Zekayi Doğan	President of Energy and Natural Resources
28	Mehmet Kuğu	Director of Transport and Infrastructure

== General Presidents ==
Position	Name	Photograph	Took office	Left office	Term of Office
Founding leader	Ahmet Davutoğlu		19 December 2019	22 August 2026	6 years, 246 days

== Parliaments ==
=== Members of Parliament serving in the New Path group ===
#	Name	constituency	Dutys
1	Selçuk Özdağ	Muğla	Deputy Chairman of the Grand National Assembly of Turkey's New Path Group
2	Cemalettin Kani Torun	Bursa (II)	parliament
3	Sema Silkin Ün	Denizli	parliament

== Future Party and elections ==
=== Parliamentary elections ===
The Future Party decided to participate in the 2023 general elections from the Republican People's Party lists. Nineteen places were reserved for the Future Party from the CHP lists. As a result of the elections, 10 people became members of parliament.

Election	Leader	Election Results			Chairs		Government
Election	Leader	Number of votes	%	±	#	±	
2023	Ahmet Davutoğlu	In accordance with the additional protocol of the Nation Alliance, he participated in the elections from the CHP lists.			10 / 600	▲10	Opposition

=== Presidential Elections ===
Election	Candidate	First Tour			Second Tour		Sonuç
Election	Candidate	Number of votes	%	±	Oy sayısı	%	Sonuç
2023	Kemal Kılıçdaroğlu Nation Alliance Joint Candidate	24.595.178	44,88% (#2)	—	25.504.724	47,8% (#2)	could not be selected

=== Local Elections ===
Election	Leader	City council			Mayor's office			
Election	Leader	Number of votes	%	±	Number of votes	%	#	±
2024	Ahmet Davutoğlu	53.898	0,11 (#18)	Yeni	34.212	0,07 (#21)	0 / 1,389	New

=== Interim local elections ===
The Future Party participated in the 2021 mayoral election in Güney, a town in the Sinanpaşa district of Afyonkarahisar. AK Party candidate Erol Karabacak was elected mayor, receiving 1021 of the 1606 valid votes cast, out of a total of 1709. The Future Party candidate, who finished fifth, received 17 votes.

== See also ==
- List of political parties in Turkey
