= Mahmut Arıkan =

Turkish politician (born 1977)

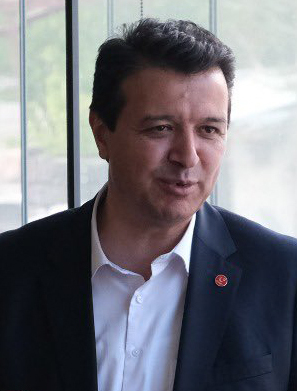
- Arıkan in 2023

Member of the Grand National Assembly
- Incumbent
- Assumed office 2 June 2023
- Constituency: Kayseri

Personal details
- Born: 1977 (age 48–49)
- Party: Felicity Party

Mahmut Arıkan (born 1977) is a Turkish politician serving as a member of the Grand National Assembly since 2023. He has served as chairman of the Felicity Party since 2024.
