= Democracy and Progress Party =

Liberal political party in Turkey

Democracy and Progress Party Demokrasi ve Atılım Partisi
- Abbreviation: DEVA Partisi
- Leader: Ali Babacan
- General Secretary: Yusuf Türkmen
- Spokesperson: Sadullah Kısacık
- Founder: Ali Babacan
- Founded: 9 March 2020; 6 years ago
- Split from: Justice and Development Party
- Headquarters: Çankaya, Ankara
- Membership (2026): ▼123,338
- Ideology: Liberal conservatism; Neoliberalism; Pro-Europeanism
- Political position: Centre-right
- National affiliation: Table of Six (2022–2023); Nation Alliance (2023); New Path (2025–present)
- Colors: Blue; White
- Slogan: Hepimizin DEVA'sı ("Remedy for all of us"); Korkma Türkiye ("Don't be afraid Turkey")
- Grand National Assembly: 8 / 600
- District municipalities: 1 / 922
- Belde Municipalities: 0 / 390
- Provincial councilors: 1 / 1,282
- Municipal Assemblies: 40 / 20,953

Website
- devapartisi.org

The Democracy and Progress Party (Turkish: Demokrasi ve Atılım Partisi, DEVA) is a Turkish political party founded on 9 March 2020 under the leadership of Ali Babacan, a former economy minister under the AKP. The official abbreviation is "DEVA" (Remedy in Turkish) according to the party records. The party's logo is a water droplet, inside a silhouette of sapling.

== History ==
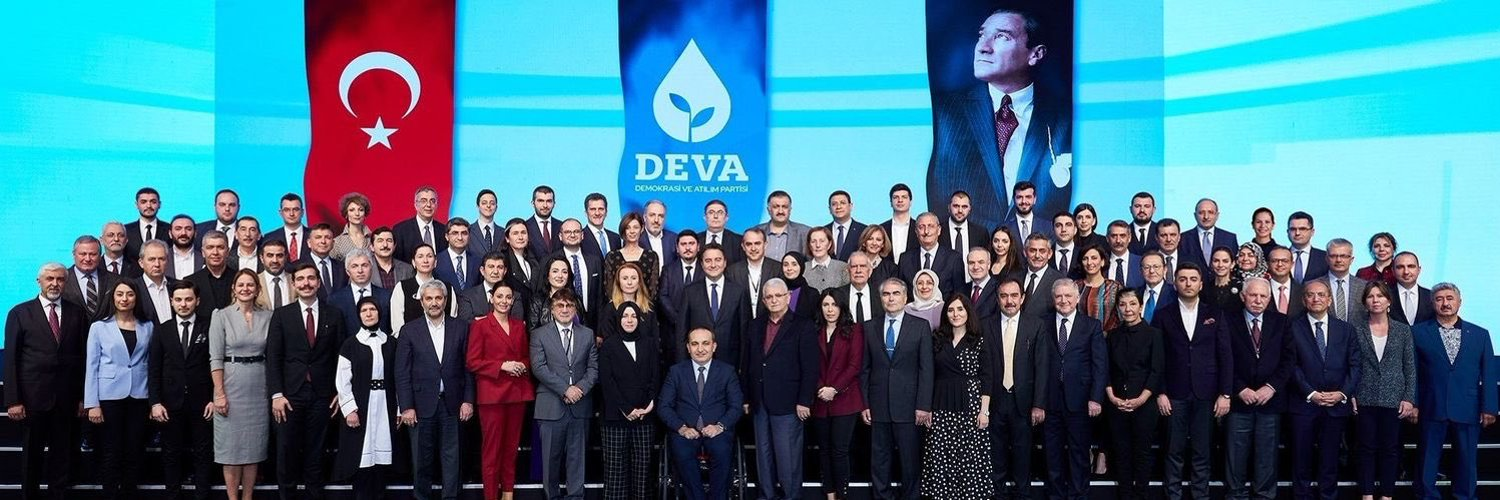
DEVA Party Founders Board

DEVA Party is a political party in Turkey formed by former Economy Minister and Deputy Prime Minister Ali Babacan as the result of a split from Recep Tayyip Erdoğan's Justice and Development Party. The party is currently being represented by 15 seats at the Grand National Assembly.

The founders of the party also include former Minister of Justice Sadullah Ergin, former Minister of Science, Industry, and Technology, Nihat Ergün and former Minister of State Selma Aliye Kavaf, who all served in Erdoğan cabinets for many years; and the former Balıkesir mayor Ahmet Edip Uğur from the Justice and Development Party as well.

Babacan was unanimously elected as the chairperson at the Founders' Meeting on 10 March 2020. He announced the official logo and agenda of the party on 11 March 2020, during the first conference of the party.

Despite his history in the AKP, Ali Babacan has adopted a secular stance in his politics in DEVA Party, emphasizing personal freedoms instead of a religious conservatism. He has criticized evolution being removed from the Biology curriculum for high school and lower education. He has also expressed his opposition against religious studies lessons being mandatory for school children, saying parents should be able to opt out of them. He has also expressed his opposition about ban on tariqas. He said: "When the government 'bans' them, they still continue their activities off the record and without any supervision. We are always in favor of freedom and transparency. Congregations and tariqas are a centuries-old tradition of these lands. You cannot destroy centuries-old tradition with a prohibitionist mentality.".

The Democracy and Progress Party has announced 22 Action Plans that will bring government reforms for the problems that the country has been facing in the recent years, addressing many different topics ranging from economy and finance policies, to entrepreneurship, to the justice system, to social problems. These plans include 90-day and 360-day goals.

== Party leaders ==
#	Leader	Portrait	Took office	Left office	Time in office
1	Ali Babacan		10 March 2020	Incumbent	6 years, 256 days

== Election results ==
=== Parliamentary elections ===
Grand National Assembly of Turkey
Year	Leader	Seats		Position
Year	Leader	Seats	+/-	Position
2023	Ali Babacan	15 / 600	▲15	Opposition

== See also ==
- List of political parties in Turkey
