= 2017 Good Party founding convention =

2017 Good Party leadership election
25 October 2017	2017 →
- Registered: 100 founding members
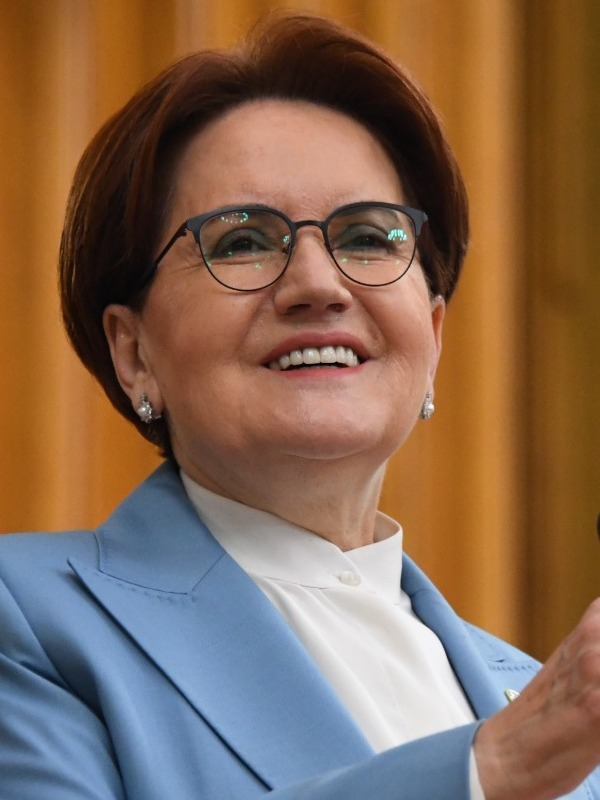
Candidate	Meral Akşener
Party	İYİ
Delegate vote	100
Percentage	100%
Elected Leader
Meral Akşener

The founding convention of the Turkish Good Party was held on 25 October 2017, on the same day as the party's establishment. Meral Akşener was declared the party's first leader unopposed, having long been established as the de facto leader of the dissident nationalist movement of politicians that had split from the Nationalist Movement Party (MHP) throughout 2016.

== Background ==
Since the November 2015 general election, several politicians from the MHP openly announced leadership challenges against MHP leader Devlet Bahçeli for his poor electoral performance, which had resulted in the party losing half of its MPs in the Grand National Assembly. The most prominent leadership candidate, Akşener, joined forces with other candidates to institute changes to the MHP constitution in order to allow for leadership challenges. This led to a series of attempts to hold extraordinary congresses throughout 2016, with one eventually being held on 19 June 2016 but being later nullified by court. With the MHP executive emerging victorious after the struggle, Akşener and all the other candidates were later suspended by the party.

Following the 2017 constitutional referendum, where the former-MHP dissidents united to oppose the constitutional changes brought forward by the Justice and Development Party (AKP) and the MHP, the dissidents united under Akşener to form a new, centrist political party. Following months of preparation, the Good Party was launched on 25 October 2017.

== Leadership election ==
Akşener officially handed over the party's foundation documents to the Ministry of the Interior on 25 October. Following the party's 100 founding members agreed upon electing a party leader. As Akşener was the only candidate and she was elected unopposed.
