= Ümit Özdağ =

Turkish politician (born 1961)

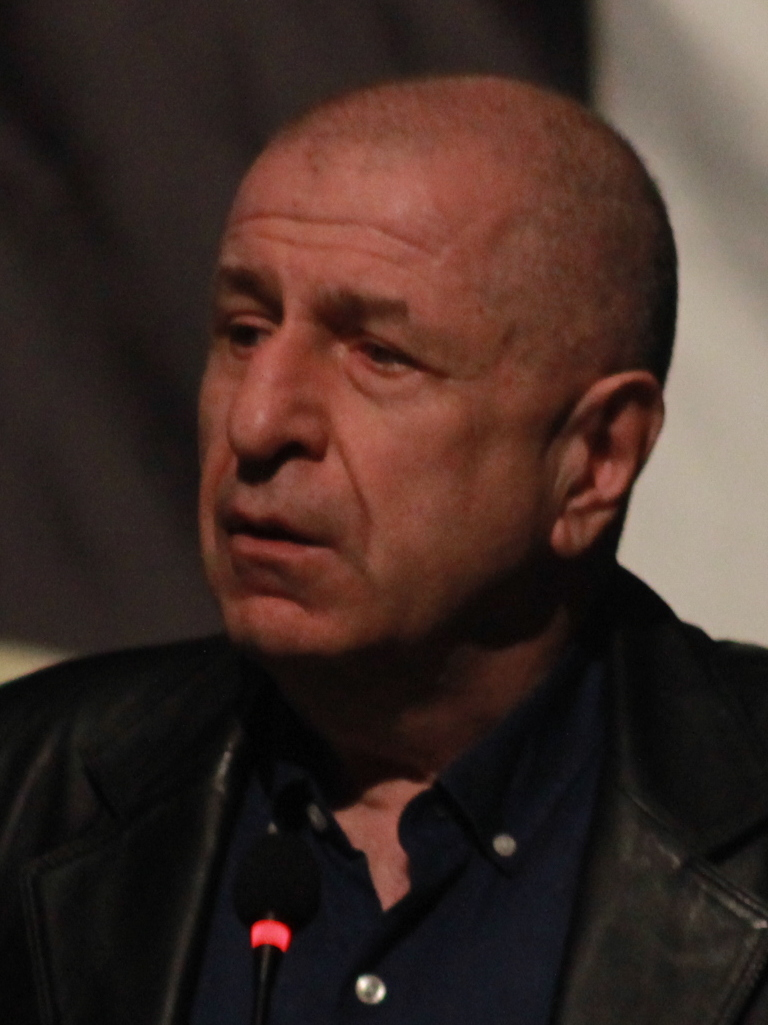
- Özdağ in 2024

Leader of the Victory Party
- Incumbent
- Assumed office 17 June 2025
- Preceded by: Ali Şehirlioğlu (acting)
- In office 26 August 2021 – 21 January 2025
- Preceded by: Party established
- Succeeded by: Ali Şehirlioğlu (acting)

Deputy Leader of the Nationalist Movement Party
- In office 14 November 2015 – 24 February 2016
- Leader: Devlet Bahçeli
- Preceded by: Yıldırım Tuğrul Türkeş
- Succeeded by: Mehmet Günal

Member of the Grand National Assembly
- In office 7 June 2015 – 3 June 2023
- Constituency: Gaziantep (Jun 2015, Nov 2015), Istanbul (II) (2018)

Personal details
- Born: 3 March 1961 (age 65) Tokyo, Japan
- Party: Nationalist Movement Party (until 2016); Good Party (2017–2020, 2021); Victory Party (2021–present)
- Spouse: Burçin Bulur (divorced)
- Children: 1
- Education: LMU Munich; Gazi University
- Occupation: Academic, politician
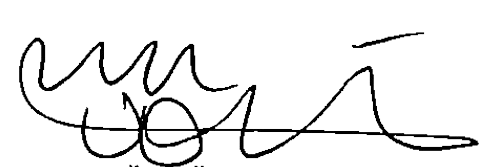
- Signature
- Website: umitozdag.com

Ümit Özdağ (Turkish: [yˈmit ˈøzdɑː]; born 3 March 1961) is a Turkish politician who returned to his position as the current leader of the Victory Party after being released from prison on 17 June 2025. Also, prior to his arrest, he had served as the leader of the Victory Party from 26 August 2021 to 21 January 2025.

He was deputy leader of the far-right Nationalist Movement Party (MHP) from November 2015 to February 2016. He announced his candidacy for the party leadership for the 8th MHP Ordinary Congress in 2006, but had his membership revoked two days later. After returning to the party following a successful lawsuit, he again announced his candidacy for the MHP leadership in April 2016 for the 2016 Nationalist Movement Party Extraordinary Congress, which was eventually called off after numerous legal disputes. He had his party membership revoked by the MHP High Disciplinary Board on 15 November 2016 joined the Good Party. In April 2019, he resigned from party's executive board but announced that he will continue to be in the party and continue his party-related activities. On 16 November 2020, Özdağ was also dismissed from the Good Party. He founded the right wing anti-immigrant Victory Party on 26 August 2021 and was elected the first chairman.

== Early life ==
Ümit Özdağ was born on 3 March 1961 in Tokyo, Japan, where his father Muzaffer Özdağ served as a Turkish government advisor after the Coup d'état of 1960. His father was of Kumyk descent, born in Pınarbaşı to a family originally from Dagestan.

His mother, Gönül Özdağ, who is a former lawyer, is the founder and first president of the MHP women's wing. His father was a close ally of MHP founder Alparslan Türkeş, and served as a member of the National Unity Committee that was installed following the 1960 Turkish coup d'état.

Özdağ studied philosophy, politics and economics at LMU Munich, before completing a Master's degree on Turkish strategic development and state planning institutions.

== Educational and academic career ==
Ümit Özdağ completed his primary, secondary and high school education at TED Ankara College. During his high school years, Ümit Özdağ started a political struggle within the idealist movement (Ülkücü Movement) at Çankaya Ülkü Ocakları and Ankara College in Ankara. Due to his nationalist activities during this struggle, he was dismissed from Ankara College with a certificate of approval upon the instruction of the Governor of Ankara. Therefore, Ümit Özdağ received his high school diploma from Aktepe High School in Ankara.

Ümit Özdağ completed his higher education at LMU Munich between 1980 and 1986. He studied political science and philosophy. He prepared his graduate study on "Planned Development and State Planning Organization in Turkey".

Ümit Özdağ started to work as a research assistant at Gazi University Faculty of Economics and Administrative Sciences in 1986. He became a doctor of political science in 1990 with his study on "Army-Political Relations in the Period of Atatürk and İnönü".

He received the title of associate professor of Political Theory in 1993 with his thesis on "Army-Political Relations in the Menderes Period and the May 27 Coup".

He then started to publish and edit the quarterly, named “Eurasia File”, which was to be published until 2004.

He has given conferences at various universities and research centers in Washington, Moscow, Tokyo, New Delhi, Cairo, Alexandria, Brussels, Tehran, Bishkek, Alma Ata, London, Munich and Tel Aviv. He has also participated in congresses in many countries and presented papers.

Working on security sciences, intelligence science, low-intensity conflict, ethnic problems, the European Union, Eurasia and the Middle East, he has twenty-eight books published. He has published 11 books that he has also edited.

== Political career ==
=== First MHP leadership bid ===
In 2006, Özdağ announced his candidacy for the leadership of the Nationalist Movement Party (MHP). His candidacy was rejected and his party membership was revoked two days later, with incumbent leader Devlet Bahçeli being re-elected. Özdağ subsequently returned to Gazi University as a lecturer. He returned to the MHP in 2010 following a successful lawsuit, being fielded as a parliamentary candidate from İstanbul's second electoral district for the 2011 general election. Being in fourth place in his party's candidate list, he was not elected.

=== Second MHP leadership bid ===
During the 11th Nationalist Movement Party Ordinary Congress, he was elected as a member of the MHP Central Executive Committee. He was elected as a Member of Parliament for Gaziantep in the June 2015 general election and was re-elected in the November 2015 general election. On 14 November, he became a Deputy Leader of the Party responsible for the Turkish world and international relations.

Özdağ resigned as deputy leader on 24 February 2016, calling for the party to hold an extraordinary congress following its heavy defeat in the November 2015 election. He announced his candidacy for the party leadership on 9 April 2016 after fellow leadership candidates began collecting delegate signatures for an extraordinary congress. The process of holding the 2016 Nationalist Movement Party Extraordinary Congress became embroiled in legal disputes and was eventually disbanded after an intervention from the Supreme Electoral Council of Turkey. On 20 October, Özdağ was again referred to the MHP High Disciplinary Board pending dismissal from the party, which took effect on 15 November 2016.

Özdağ claimed that his dismissal also originated from his opposition to an executive presidency, which Devlet Bahçeli supported. The MHP announced that they would jointly draft a new constitution that included an executive presidency with the governing Justice and Development Party (AKP) in October 2016.

=== Victory Party ===
In August 2021, he announced the foundation of the Victory Party, a far-right, anti-immigrant political party, whose logo was inspired by Mustafa Kemal Atatürk and the Seljuk leader Alp Arslan. In May 2022 he had an altercation with Interior Minister Süleyman Soylu, who amongst other statements deemed him a puppet of George Soros, "not a human, lower than an animal" during a TV broadcast. In response, Özdağ challenged to see Soylu at his ministry, and that if he was "man enough" should not hide behind the Turkish police. As Özdağ then showed up at the ministry, he was blocked by the police.

According to a Bloomberg analysis, the average likes Ümit Özdağ got on Twitter in May 2022 exceeded Recep Tayyip Erdoğan.

==== Arrest ====
An investigation was launched against Ümit Özdağ for insulting President Recep Tayyip Erdoğan. Özdağ was detained on January 20, 2025. A day later, on January 21, he was arrested on charges of "publicly inciting the public to hatred and hostility or insulting them". Some of the posts were related to the 2024 anti-refugee riots in Turkey. On 17 June, Özdağ was sentenced to two years' imprisonment for the charges, but was ordered released by the same court due to time served in pre-trial detention.

In June 2026, he was fined 8.700 lira by a court for "insulting the memory of Sheikh Said". Özdağ stated that the sentence would be appealed. Özdağ had called Said a "traitor".

== Personal life ==
Özdağ is divorced and has one son. He speaks Turkish, English and German.

== Electoral history ==
=== Parliamentary ===
As an MP

Election	Constituency	Party	Votes			Seats	Elected
Election	Constituency	Party	#	%	Rank	Seats	Elected
June 2015	Gaziantep	Nationalist Movement Party	165,917	17.7%	2nd	2 / 12	Yes
November 2015	Gaziantep	Nationalist Movement Party	91,997	9.5%	4th	1 / 12	Yes
2018	Istanbul (II)	Good Party	204,598	7.58%	5th	2 / 28	Yes
2023	Gaziantep	Victory Party	37,998	3.25%	7th	0 / 14	No

As a party leader

Election	Party	Votes			Seats		Position
Election	Party	#	%	Rank	#	±	Position
2023	Victory Party	1,215,264	2.23%	7th	0 / 600	new	Extra-parliamentary opposition

== Books ==
- Değişen Dünya Dengeleri ve Basra Körfezi Krizi, 1990
- Atatürk ve İnönü Dönemlerinde Ordu-Siyaset İlişkisi, ISBN 978-975-6217-26-9
- Menderes ve İnönü Döneminde Ordu-Siyaset İlişkileri ve 27 Mayıs İhtilali, 1996, ISBN 978-975-521-079-7
- Türkiye, Kuzey Irak ve PKK - Bir Gayri Nizami Savaşın Anatomisi, 1999
- Türkiye-Avrupa Birliği İlişkileri, 2003
- Türkiye'de Düşük Yoğunluklu Çatışma ve PKK, 2005
- Yeniden Türk Milliyetçiliği, 2006, ISBN 978-975-6105-01-6
- Gelecek 1000 Yılda da Buradayız, 2006, ISBN 978-605-4991-36-5
- Kürtçülük Sorununun Analizi ve Çözüm Politikaları, 2006, ISBN 978-975-22-0179-8
- Atatürk ve İnönü Dönemlerinde Türk Silahlı Kuvvetleri, 2006, ISBN 978-605-4991-53-2
- Türk Ordusunun PKK Operasyonları, 2007, ISBN 978-9944-326-88-9
- Kerkük, Irak ve Ortadoğu, 2007, ISBN 978-975-6217-54-2
- Türk Ordusunun Kuzey Irak Operasyonları, 2008, ISBN 978-605-4991-91-4
- Telafer: Bir Türkmen Kentinin Amerikan Ordusu ve Peşmergelere Karşı Savaşı, 2008, ISBN 978-975-6424-40-7
- İstihbarat Teorisi, 2008, ISBN 605-4125-01-X
- PKK Neden Bitmedi Nasıl Biter - Kürtçülük Sorununun Analizi ve Çözüm Politikaları, 2008
- Pusu ve Katliamların Kronolojisi, 2009, ISBN 978-605-4125-18-0
- Ermeni Psikolojik Savaşı, (Prof. Dr. Özcan Yeniçeri ile), 2009, ISBN 978-605-4125-15-9
- Cumhuriyetin En Uzun Dört Yılından Geçerken Türk Sorunu, 2010
- Türk Ordusu PKK’yı Nasıl Yendi, Türkiye PKK’ya Nasıl Teslim Oluyor, 2010, ISBN 978-605-4125-30-2
- Doğu Raporu, (İkbal Vurucu ve Ali Aydın Akbaş ile birlikte), 2011, ISBN 978-605-4125-39-5
- İkinci Tek Parti Dönemi - AKP'nin Yumuşak Hegemon Parti Projesinin Anatomisi, 2011
- Küçük Orta Doğu: Suriye, 2012, ISBN 978-605-4125-79-1
- 21. Yüzyılda Prens, 2012, ISBN 978-605-4125-78-4
- Algı Yönetimi: Propaganda, Psikolojik Savaş, Örtülü Operasyon ve Enformasyon Savaşı, 2014, ISBN 978-605-4991-08-2
- İstihbarat Örgütleri, 2015, ISBN 978-605-4991-09-9
- Milli Güvenlik Teorisi, 2015, ISBN 978-605-4991-26-6
- Türk Dış Politikası, (Yelda Demirağ ile birlikte), 2016, ISBN 978-605-4991-41-9
- PKK İle Pazarlık: Öcalan İle Anayasa Yapmak, 2016, ISBN 978-605-4125-83-8
- Türk'ün Vatanla İmtihanı, 2017, ISBN 978-605-311-242-6
- 100.Yılında Birinci Dünya Savaşı, 2017
- Türk Dış Politikasını Nasıl Bilirdiniz, (Yelda Demirağ ile Birlikte), 2017, ISBN 978-605-4991-61-7
- İstihbarat Örgütleri, 2017
- Cesetler Gölgeler Yalanlar, 2017, ISBN 978-605-4125-53-1
- İkinci Tek Parti Dönemi, 2017, ISBN 978-605-4125-41-8
- Teşkilat-ı Mahsusa'nın 100.Yılında Türk İstihbaratı, 2017
- 21. Yüzyılda Türk Dünyası Jeopolitiği, 2017, ISBN 978-975-6769-78-2
- Türk Sorunu, 2017, ISBN 978-605-4125-19-7
- Kendi Ülkesinde Kuşatılan ve Bölünen Ordu: Türk Silahlı Kuvvetleri, 2019, ISBN 978-605-4125-98-2
- Kaçınılmaz Çöküş, 2019, ISBN 978-605-311-567-0
- Türk Dış Politikasında Hasar Tespiti, 2019, ISBN 978-605-311-773-5
- Stratejik Göç Mühendisliği, 2020, ISBN 978-605-7908-23-0
- Saray Rejiminin Çöküşü ve Türkiye'nin Yükselişi, 2021, ISBN 978-625-44470-2-0

== See also ==
- Sinan Oğan
- Koray Aydın
