= 11th Nationalist Movement Party Ordinary Congress =

Nationalist Movement Party Ordinary Congress, 2015
| ← 2012 | 21 March 2015 | 2016 → |
- Turnout: 93.4%
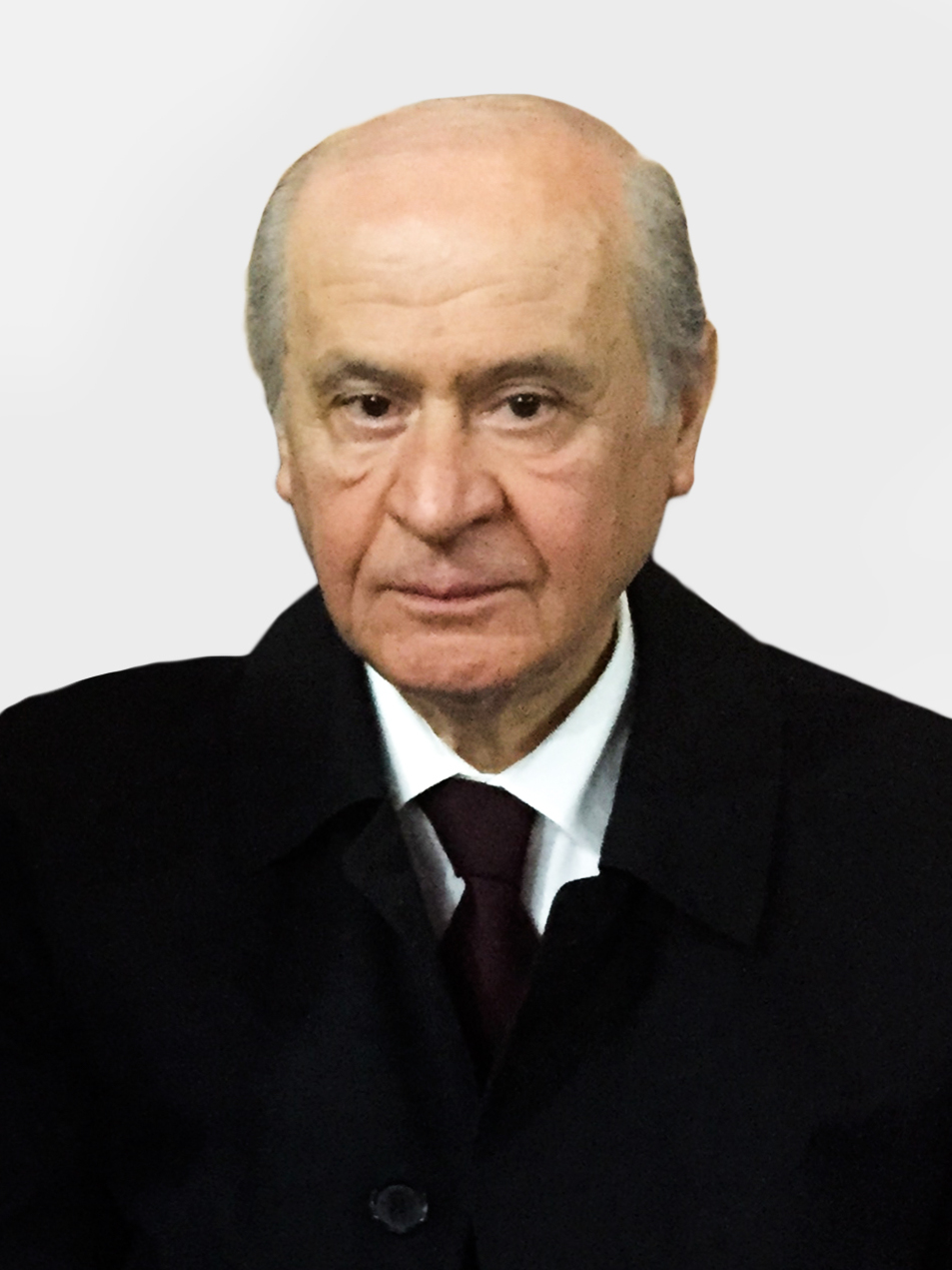
| Candidate | Devlet Bahçeli |
| Party | MHP |
| Constituency | Osmaniye |
| Popular vote | 1,149 |
| Percentage | 100% |
Leader before election
Devlet Bahçeli
MHP
Elected Leader
Devlet Bahçeli
MHP

The 11th Nationalist Movement Party Ordinary Congress (Turkish: 11. Milliyetçi Hareket Partisi Olağan Kongresi) was a political party convention held by the Turkish right-wing Nationalist Movement Party (MHP) on 21 March 2015. The Congress resulted in the re-election of Devlet Bahçeli as party leader, with rivals failing to obtain enough signatures to contest the leadership election.

== Timing and date ==
The congress was held on 21 March 2015, which was significant due to the close proximity to the general election held on 7 June 2015. Furthermore, the Congress coincided with Newroz, the celebration of the Iranian new year by Kurdish people in Turkey. As a Turkish nationalist party, the holding of the Congress on the same day as the Newroz celebrations was seen as significant. MHP Deputy Leader Semih Yalçın stated that the timing was not a coincidence, stating that as Newroz was seen as the beginning of Spring, the MHP congress would also be seen as a new liberator from 13 years of Justice and Development Party government.

According to Habertürk journalist Muharrem Sarıkaya, the MHP leader Devlet Bahçeli decided to hold the congress on the same day as Newroz to divert media attention away from the mainly Kurdish-populated city of Diyarbakır, where the bulk of the Newroz celebrations were due to take place. When giving his speech, Bahçeli began wishing members well for Newroz and Newroz celebrations were also widespread at the congress.

The media interpreted mixed messages from the clash of the congress and Newroz celebrations. It was seen by some as an open message to the AKP government and President Recep Tayyip Erdoğan as an open attack on the Solution process between the government and Kurdish rebels. It was also seen by some as a message that the 21st of March was not simply a date owned by the Kurds.

== Agenda ==
The congress was held in the Ankara Arena, with Devlet Bahçeli arriving at 11:00 local time. The venue was heavily crowded by supporters who had arrived both inside and outside the venue to watch the congress. A Newroz lantern had initially been planned to mark Bahçeli's arrival, though this was abandoned for safety reasons. The venue was decorated with flags containing the MHP's party logo, as well as posters of Mustafa Kemal Atatürk and the MHP's founder Alparslan Türkeş. No posters of Bahçeli were hung, at his own request. Singers Atilla Yılmaz, Ali Tufan Kıraç and Mustafa Yıldızdoğan gave a concert at the congress while a folklore group also gave a performance.

== June 2015 general election ==
Held 78 days before the June 2015 general election, the congress also determined the MHP's election team and slogans. The main slogan used in the congress was 'Walk with us, Turkey!' (Bizimle Yürü Türkiye!). Bahçeli's speech also focussed heavily on criticising the Solution process initiated by the Turkish government with Kurdish separatists, thereby also indicating the main campaign issues and policies in the preparation for the general election.

== Leadership election ==
A candidate needs at least 40 signatures from the party's 1,242 delegates in order to run for election.

=== Candidates ===
- Devlet Bahçeli, Member of Parliament for Osmaniye and leader of the MHP since 1997
- Mesut Türker, former MHP Member of Parliament for Yozgat between 1999 and 2002.

Only Bahçeli managed to secure the 40 signatures needed to contest the leadership election. Sinan Oğan was also seen as a potential candidate but did not apply for candidacy.

=== Results ===
| Candidate | Votes | % |
|---|---|---|
| Devlet Bahçeli | 1,149 | 100.0 |
| Invalid/blank votes | 11 | – |
| Total | 1,160 | 100.0 |
| Number of delegates/turnout | 1,242 | 93.4 |
Source: Sözcü

== See also ==
- 2014 Justice and Development Party Extraordinary Congress
- 2014 Republican People's Party Extraordinary Convention
