= Gaziantep (electoral district) =

Electoral district for the Grand National Assembly of Turkey

Coordinates: 37°50′N 34°45′E

- electoral district for the Grand National Assembly of Turkey
- Gaziantep shown within Turkey
- Province: Gaziantep
- Electorate: 1,003,541

Current electoral district
- Created: 1923
- Seats: 12 Historical: 10 (2002–2007) 9 (1999)
- Turnout at last election: 84.09%
- Representation
- AK Party: 6 / 12
- MHP: 2 / 12
- CHP: 2 / 12
- HDP: 2 / 12

Gaziantep is an electoral district of the Grand National Assembly of Turkey. It elects four members of parliament (deputies) to represent the province of the same name for a four-year term by the D'Hondt method, a party-list proportional representation system.

== Members ==
Population reviews of each electoral district are conducted before each general election, which can lead to certain districts being granted a smaller or greater number of parliamentary seats. Gaziantep is a district growing in population, with its number of seats increasing from 9 to 12 from 1999 to 2011.

MPs for Gaziantep, 1999 onwards
Election	1999 (21st Parliament)	2002 (22nd Parliament)	2007 (23rd Parliament)	2011 (24th Parliament)	June 2015 (25th Parliament)
MP	Mustafa Rüştü Taşar; ANAP	Ömer Abuşoğlu; AK Party	Mehmet Erdoğan; AK Party		
MP	Ali Ilıksoy; DSP	Mahmut Durdu; AK Party		Abdullah Necat Koçer; AK Party	
MP	Mustafa Yılmaz; DSP	Nurettin Aktaş; AK Party	İbrahim Halil Mazıcıoğlu; AK Party		Abdulhamit Gül; AK Party
MP	İbrahim Konukoğlu; DYP	Mehmet Sarı; AK Party			Mehmet Şimşek; AK Party
MP	Nurettin Aktaş; Virtue	Kürşad Tüzmen; AK Party	Özlem Müftüoğlu; AK Party	Şamil Tayyar; AK Party	
MP	Mehmet Bedri İncetahtacı; Virtue	Fatma Şahin; AK Party			Canan Candemir Çelik; AK Party
MP	Mehmet Ay; MHP	Ahmet Uzer; AK Party	Mehmet Şimşek; AK Party	Derya Bakbak; AK Party	Celal Doğan; HDP
MP	Mehmet Hanifi Tiryaki; MHP	Abdulkadir Ateş; CHP	Yaşar Ağyüz; CHP	Hüseyin Çelik; AK Party	Mahmut Toğrul; HDP
MP	Ali Özdemir; MHP	Mustafa Yılmaz; CHP	Akif Ekici; CHP	Ali Şahin; AK Party	Ümit Özdağ; MHP
MP	No seat	Ahmet Yılmazkaya; CHP	Hasan Özdemir; MHP	Edip Semih Yalçın; MHP	Ertuğrul Tolga Orhan; MHP
MP	No seat			Mehmet Şeker; CHP	
MP	No seat			Ali Serindağ; CHP	Mehmet Gökdağ; CHP

== General elections ==
=== 2011 ===
2011 general election: Gaziantep
Party	Candidate	Votes	%	±%
AK Party	9 elected ▲2: 1. Hüseyin Çelik ✓; 2. Fatma Şahin ✓; 3. Şamil Tayyar ✓; 4. Abdullah Nejat Koçer ✓; 5. Mehmet Sarı ✓; 6. Mehmet Erdoğan ✓; 7. Derya Bakbak ✓; 8. İbrahim Halil Mazıcıoğlu ✓; 9. Ali Şahin ✓; 10. Fikret Murat Tural ✗; 11. Abdullah Tombul ✗; 12. Adem Yücel ✗	510,923	61.69	▲2.43
CHP	2 elected 0: 1. Mehmet Şeker ✓; 2. Ali Serindağ ✓; 3. İrfan Kaplan ✗; 4. Cennet Süzer ✗; 5. Mehmet Gökdağ ✗; 6. Bayram Yılmazkaya ✗; 7. Akif Ekici ✗; 8. Mahmut Kozbaş ✗; 9. Lütfü Demir ✗; 10. Yaşar Ağyüz ✗; 11. Naci Kılıç ✗; 12. Fehime Çifçi ✗	159,961	19.31	▲1.75
MHP	1 elected 0: 1. Edip Semih Yalçın ✓; 2. Emine Aybüken Yıldırım ✗; 3. Ali Özdemir ✗; 4. Behiç Şahin ✗; 5. Mustafa Kızıklı ✗; 6. Cuma Kaymakçı ✗; 7. Hüseyin Söğütcü ✗; 8. Mehmet Yavuz ✗; 9. Bekir İnci ✗; 10. Davut Karabacak ✗; 11. Dündar Yahnici ✗; 12. Ülkü Kanbur ✗	77,836	9.40	▼1.99
Independent	None elected: Nizamettin Özseven ✗ Abdullah Sabri Kocaman ✗ Akın Birdal ✗	44,610	5.39	▲0.33
SAADET	None elected: 1. Mehmet Karalar ✗; 2. Şükrü Koçak ✗; 3. Ahmet Necati Sarı ✗; 4. Serap Erkal ✗; 5. Ömer Balcı ✗; 6. Ali Mullaoğlu ✗; 7. Enver Polat ✗; 8. Mustafa Akar ✗; 9. Yavuz Batmaz ✗; 10. Abdullah Öztürk ✗; 11. Ömer Karabacak ✗; 12. İsrafil Kılınç ✗	8,270	1.00	▼0.42
Büyük Birlik	None elected: 1. İhsan Kaya ✗; 2. Ahmet Çavuş ✗; 3. Adil Turnalar ✗; 4. İsmail Kaya ✗; 5. Yunus Seyhan ✗; 6. Yılmaz Özkan ✗; 7. Vakıf Orhan ✗; 8. Hayali Küçük ✗; 9. Adem Karakurt ✗; 10. Ercan Sarıkaya ✗; 11. Mehmet Demir ✗; 12. Hakan Kaya ✗	7,828	0.95	▲0.95
HAS Party	None elected: 1. Muhammed Vahit Abuşoğlu ✗; 2. Suat Bozkurt ✗; 3. Latif Can ✗; 4. Bekir Şen ✗; 5. Müzeyyen Köse ✗; 6. Fetullah Genç ✗; 7. Mehmet Dinç ✗; 8. Erkan Karakaş ✗; 9. Ramazan Diril ✗; 10. İsmail Kök ✗; 11. Fadime Özbey ✗; 12. Sinan Karakaş ✗	6,779	0.82	▲0.82
DP	None elected: 1. Ömer Eyercioğlu ✗; 2. Yaşar Sağlam ✗; 3. Ömer Faruk Boztepe ✗; 4. Davut Akdoğan ✗; 5. Özden Fatma Müftüoğlu ✗; 6. Mehmet Özden ✗; 7. Bedrettin Özdemir ✗; 8. Ümit Demez ✗; 9. Ali Konukseven ✗; 10. Mustafa Hasan Elmas ✗; 11. Mahmut Özdemir ✗; 12. İsmail Zateroğulları ✗	5,341	0.64	▼1.75
DSP	None elected: 1. Erdal Çerkezoğlu ✗; 2. Filiz Çıtacı ✗; 3. Remzi Büyüknacar ✗; 4. Ramazan Demircan ✗; 5. Şükrü Ayhan ✗; 6. Ercan Şahan ✗; 7. Serap Tiryaki ✗; 8. Hacı Şenoğlu ✗; 9. Mehmet Kalman ✗; 10. Fatma Barna ✗; 11. Cennet Çoban ✗; 12. Cevdet Oğuz ✗	2,085	0.25	N/A
HEPAR	None elected: 1. Mesut Ceyran ✗; 2. Davut Savcı ✗; 3. İsa Kök ✗; 4. Ahmet Levent Kılıç ✗; 5. Metin Yanardağ ✗; 6. Zafer Kılıçparlar ✗; 7. Yurda Gül Savcı ✗; 8. Mehmet Fatih Yıldırım ✗; 9. Pınar Ekinler ✗; 10. Nuran Demir ✗; 11. Oğuzhan Borahan ✗; 12. Mehmet Yıldız ✗	1,556	0.19	▲0.19
TKP	None elected: 1. Levent İncedere ✗; 2. Sibel Altıntaş ✗; 3. Abdurrahim Kahraman ✗; 4. Habip Sülü ✗; 5. Emrah Uzunca ✗; 6. Mustafa Hoşaf ✗; 7. Ali Bakır ✗; 8. Yaşar Tosun ✗; 9. Hülya Kahraman ✗; 10. Mehmet Fatih Aslanpay ✗; 11. Mehmet Duran ✗; 12. Fulya Zengin ✗	1,336	0.16	▼0.09
MP	None elected: 1. Mehmet Emrullah ✗; 2. Ali Bakım ✗; 3. Mehmet Çetiner ✗; 4. Mehmet Karakaya ✗; 5. Hasan Ertürk ✗; 6. Mehmet Sait İncearık ✗; 7. Cuma Nacar ✗; 8. Mehmet Ali Sivaslıoğlu ✗; 9. Mehmet Ekinci ✗; 10. Ali Yalvaç ✗; 11. Nulifer İnceer ✗; 12. Esma Özdöver ✗	1,188	0.14	▲0.14
Nationalist Conservative	None elected: 1. Halaf Serin ✗; 2. Mehmet Kurt ✗; 3. Osman Kılıç ✗; 4. Müslüm Aslan ✗; 5. Mehmet Polat ✗; 6. Kürşat Yetişgen ✗; 7. Öztürk Yılmaz ✗; 8. Nokta Civaoğlu ✗; 9. Ali Şeremet ✗; 10. Orhan Memoğlu ✗; 11. Hakkı Yaroğlu ✗; 12. Ali Civaoğlu ✗	528	0.06	▲0.06
Liberal Democrat	No candidates	0	0.00	0.00
Labour	No candidates	0	0.00	0.00
DYP	No candidates	0	0.00	0.00
Total votes		828,241	100.00	
Rejected ballots		18,193	2.16	▼0.42
Turnout		843,849	84.09	▲3.18
AK Party hold Majority		350,962	42.37	▲0.68

=== June 2015 ===
Abbr.	Party	Votes	%
AKP	Justice and Development Party	428,451	47%
MHP	Nationalist Movement Party	163,967	18%
CHP	Republican People's Party	149,170	16.4%
HDP	Peoples' Democratic Party	138,678	15.2%
SP	Felicity Party	18,827	2.1%
	Other	13,237	1.5%
Total		912,330	
Turnout		82.44	
source: YSK

=== November 2015 ===
Abbr.	Party	Votes	%
AKP	Justice and Development Party	581,085	61.7%
CHP	Republican People's Party	153,075	16.2%
HDP	Peoples' Democratic Party	98,516	10.5%
MHP	Nationalist Movement Party	90,142	9.6%
SP	Felicity Party	5,852	0.6%
	Other	13,535	1.4%
Total		942,205	
Turnout		83.96	
source: YSK

=== 2018 ===
Abbr.	Party	Votes	%
AKP	Justice and Development Party	515,715	50.6%
CHP	Republican People's Party	152,163	14.9%
MHP	Nationalist Movement Party	128,473	12.6%
HDP	Peoples' Democratic Party	119,393	11.7%
IYI	Good Party	68,450	6.7%
SP	Felicity Party	12,257	1.2%
HÜDA-PAR	Free Cause Party	8,703	0.9%
	Other	14,372	1.4%
Total		1,019,525	
Turnout		85.58	
source: YSK

== Presidential elections ==
=== 2014 ===
2014 presidential election: Gaziantep
Party	Candidate	Votes	%
AK Party	Recep Tayyip Erdoğan	475,535	60.44
Independent	Ekmeleddin İhsanoğlu	228,148	29.00
HDP	Selahattin Demirtaş	83,076	10.56
Total votes		786,759	100.00
Rejected ballots		14,297	1.78
Turnout		801,056	73.10
Recep Tayyip Erdoğan win			
