= Osmaniye (electoral district) =

Electoral district for the Grand National Assembly of Turkey

Coordinates: 37°15′N 36°15′E

- electoral district for the Grand National Assembly of Turkey
- Osmaniye shown within Turkey
- Province: Osmaniye
- Electorate: 312,974

Current electoral district
- Created: 1999
- Seats: 4
- MPs: List: Suat Önal AKP Mücahit Durmuşoğlu AKP Devlet Bahçeli MHP Ruhi Ersoy MHP
- Turnout at last election: 87.15%
- Representation
- AK Party: 2 / 4
- CHP: 1 / 4
- MHP: 1 / 4

Osmaniye is an electoral district of the Grand National Assembly of Turkey. It elects 4 members of parliament (deputies) to represent the province of the same name for a four-year term by the D'Hondt method, a party-list proportional representation system.

== Members ==
Population reviews of each electoral district are conducted before each general election, which can lead to certain districts being granted a smaller or greater number of parliamentary seats. Osmaniye became a province in 1996 and first directly elected members to parliament in the 1999 general election. It has always sent four members to Ankara.

Osmaniye is the home town and parliamentary seat of the Nationalist Movement Party, Devlet Bahçeli.

MPs for Osmaniye, 1999 onwards
Seat	1999 (21st parliament)	2002 (22nd parliament)	2007 (23rd parliament)	2011 (24th parliament)	June 2015 (25th parliament)
MP	Devlet Bahçeli; MHP	Mehmet Sarı; AK Party	Devlet Bahçeli; MHP		
MP	Birol Büyüköztürk; MHP	Necati Uzdil; CHP	Hakan Coşkun; MHP	Hasan Hüseyin Türkoğlu; MHP	Ruhi Ersoy; MHP
MP	Mehmet Kundakçı; MHP	Durdu Mehmet Kastal; AK Party			Mücahit Durmuşoğlu; AK Party
MP	Şükrü Ünal; FP / AK Party		İbrahim Mete Doğruer; AK Party	Suat Önal; AK Party	

== General elections ==
=== 2011 ===
2011 Turkish general election: Osmaniye
List	Candidates	Votes	Of total (%)	± from prev.
AK Party	Suat Önal, Durdu Mehmet Kastal	115,785	43.11	
MHP	Devlet Bahçeli, Hasan Hüseyin Türkoğlu	110,708	41.22	
CHP	None elected	30,877	11.50	
Independents	None elected	2038	0.76	
SAADET	None elected	2021	0.75	
HAS Party	None elected	1871	0.7	N/A
Büyük Birlik	None elected	1715	0.64	
DP	None elected	1083	0.4	
DYP	None elected	790	0.29	
Nationalist Conservative	None elected	475	0.18	
DSP	None elected	380	0.14	'"`UNIQ−−ref−0000000D−QINU`"'
HEPAR	None elected	317	0.12	
MP	None elected	275	0.1	
Communist_Party_of_Turkey_(today)	None elected	269	0.1	
Labour	None elected	0		
Liberal Democrat	None elected	0		
Turnout		543,328	89,24	

=== June 2015 ===
Abbr.	Party	Votes	%
MHP	Nationalist Movement Party	114,990	41.1%
AKP	Justice and Development Party	108,756	38.9%
CHP	Republican People's Party	37,330	13.3%
HDP	Peoples' Democratic Party	10,735	3.8%
SP	Felicity Party	3,774	1.3%
	Other	4,340	1.6%
Total		279,925	
Turnout		84.96	
source: YSK

=== November 2015 ===
Abbr.	Party	Votes	%
AKP	Justice and Development Party	132,713	46.7%
MHP	Nationalist Movement Party	98,178	40.5%
CHP	Republican People's Party	38,526	13.6%
HDP	Peoples' Democratic Party	7,553	2.7%
SP	Felicity Party	1,428	0.5%
	Other	5,497	1.9%
Total		283,895	
Turnout		85.08	
source: YSK

=== 2018 ===
Abbr.	Party	Votes	%
AKP	Justice and Development Party	105,800	34.9%
MHP	Nationalist Movement Party	95,799	31.6%
IYI	Good Party	41,087	13.6%
CHP	Republican People's Party	40,424	13.3%
HDP	Peoples' Democratic Party	9,585	3.2%
SP	Felicity Party	2,987	1%
	Other	7,403	2.4%
Total		303,085	
Turnout		86.36	
source: YSK

== Presidential elections ==
=== 2018 ===
Presidential Election 2018: Osmaniye
Party	Candidate	Votes	%
AK Party	Recep Tayyip Erdoğan	188,686	63.13
CHP	Muharrem İnce	66,514	22.25
İYİ	Meral Akşener	34,387	11.50
HDP	Selahattin Demirtaş	6,373	2.13
SAADET	Temel Karamollaoğlu	2,320	0.78
Patriotic	Doğu Perinçek	615	0.21
Total votes		298,895	100.00
Rejected ballots		8,740	2.84
Turnout		307,635	86.06

=== 2014 ===
Presidential Election 2014: Osmaniye
Party	Candidate	Votes	%
Independent	Ekmeleddin İhsanoğlu	120,697	48.59
AK Party	Recep Tayyip Erdoğan	120,659	48.57
HDP	Selahattin Demirtaş	7,052	2.84
Total votes		248,408	100.00
Rejected ballots		4,390	1.74
Turnout		252,798	76.31
