= 2016 Nationalist Movement Party Extraordinary Congress =

Party conventions of the Turkish MHP

Nationalist Movement Party Extraordinary Congress, 2016
- 19 June 2016 (annulled)
- Registered: 1,211 delegates
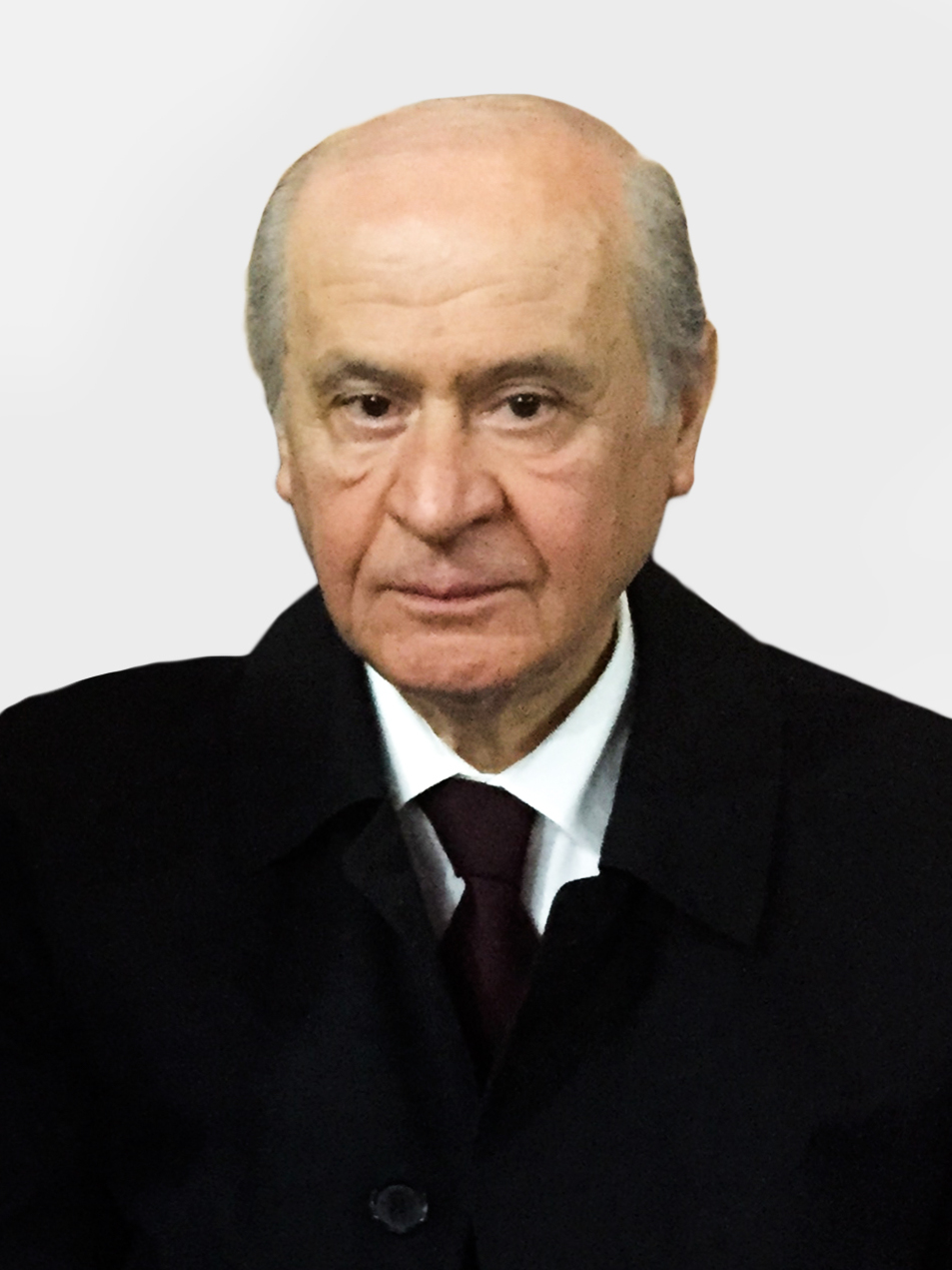

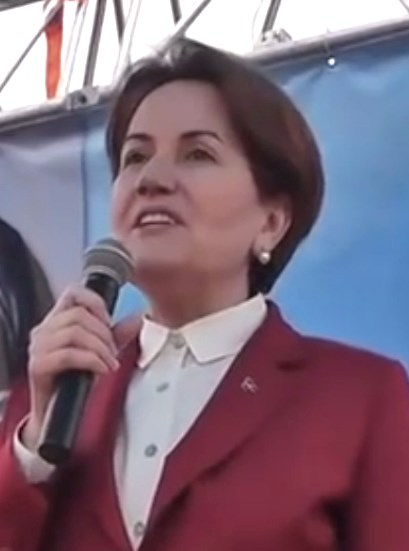

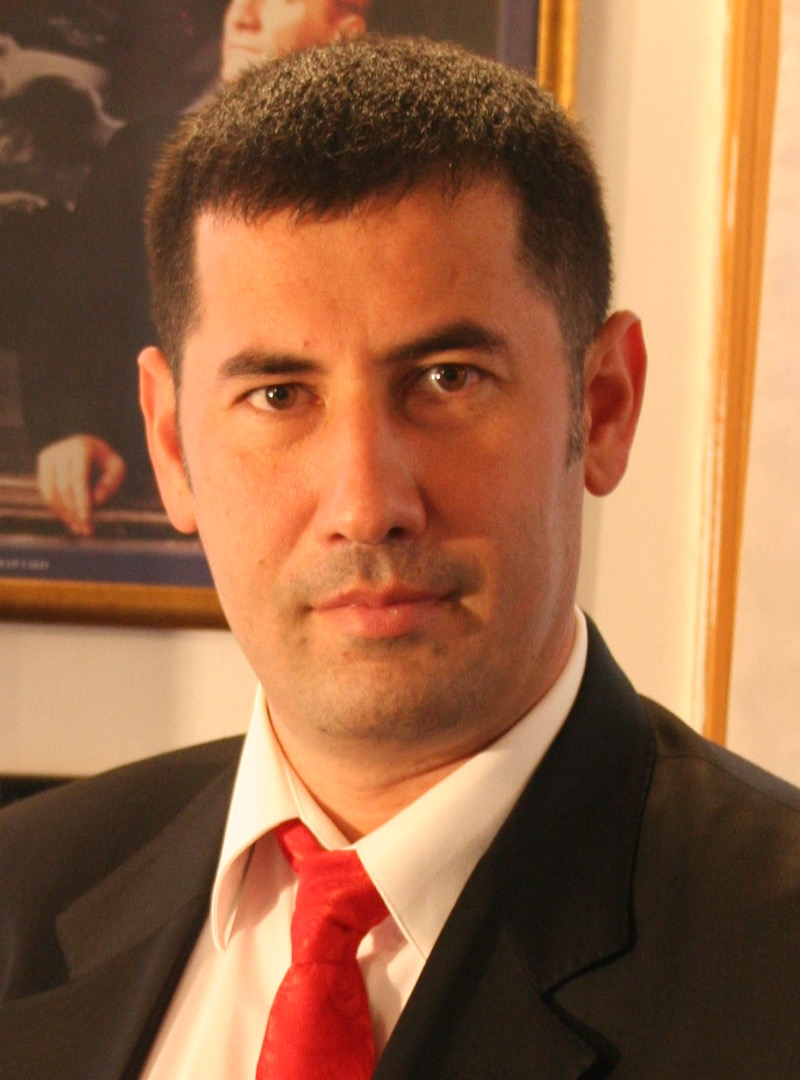

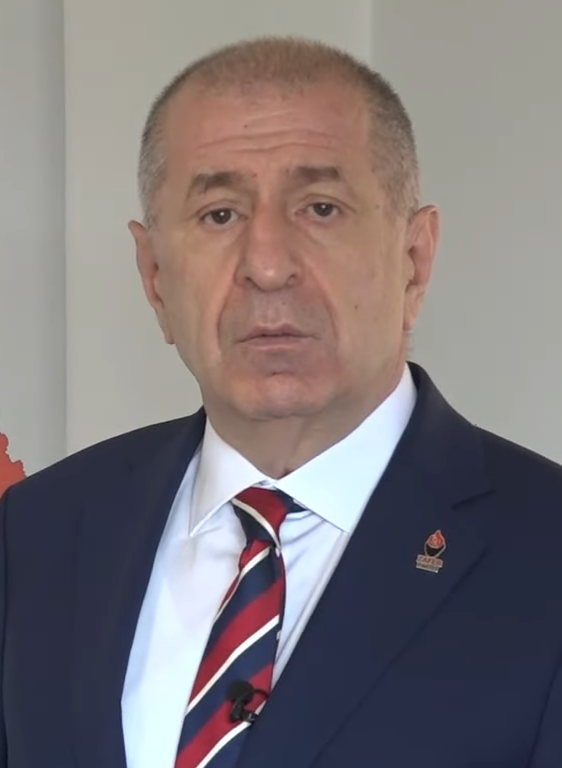

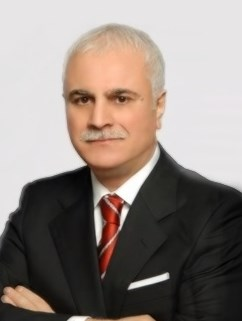
Candidate	Devlet Bahçeli	Meral Akşener	Sinan Oğan
Party	MHP	MHP	MHP
Candidate	Ümit Özdağ	Koray Aydın	Süleyman Servet Sazak
Party	MHP	MHP	MHP
Candidate	Selim Kaptanoğlu
Party	MHP
Leader before election
Devlet Bahçeli
MHP
Elected Leader
None elected

The 2016 Nationalist Movement Party Extraordinary Congresses referred to two party conventions of the Turkish Nationalist Movement Party (MHP), the first of which was held on 19 June 2016, in order to vote on proposed changes to the MHP party constitution and elect a new leader. The congress was initially intended to be held on 15 May 2016 after enough delegates submitted the required signatures, however it was delayed after judiciary conflicts between different courts. After the final decision by Court of Cassation allowing the congress to go ahead, the party executive announced that an extraordinary congress with a leadership election would be held on 10 July while the invitation committee formed by the court declared that the constitutional extraordinary congress would occur on 19 June 2016. Although the MHP executive declared the congress to be against the MHP constitution and legally flawed, the first Congress was held as planned by the inner-party opposition, with a unanimous vote to change the constitution being achieved. The second congress was delayed after judiciary intervention requested by MHP officials, along with a formal request from the Supreme Electoral Council (YSK). The congress was eventually not held, prompting the dissidents to resign and join forces under a new party, namely the Good Party.

The congress was called for by several inner-party critics of the MHP's current leader Devlet Bahçeli, who had led the party to a heavy defeat in the November 2015 general election. However, since the party constitution did not allow leadership elections at any congress other than the routine ordinary congresses (the next due to take place in 2018), a 'constitutional congress' was required before a leadership vote to amend the constitution and allow an earlier vote to take place. It was therefore expected that the congress due to be held on 15 May would be the first of two MHP party congresses held in the year 2016, the latter featuring a leadership election should constitutional amendments be successful.

== Background ==
=== Coalition process ===
The MHP, having been projected to win over many disaffected voters from the governing Justice and Development Party (AKP) during the June 2015 general election, managed to win 80 seats in Parliament with 16.29% of the vote. In the same election, the AKP failed to win a parliamentary majority, with many commentators expecting the MHP to join the AKP in a coalition given ideological similarities. The post-election strategy of MHP leader Devlet Bahçeli was heavily criticised for being counterproductive and ideologically baseless, with Bahçeli rejecting almost all offers made to him by other parties. Having rejected a coalition with the AKP and declared support for an early election, he later rejected an offer by the Republican People's Party (CHP) leader Kemal Kılıçdaroğlu to head a triple-party coalition as Prime Minister. At the same time, Bahçeli was criticised for effectively 'handing over' the June–July 2015 Parliament Speaker election to the AKP candidate by abstaining. Fresh elections were called for November 2015 after all government formation attempts failed.

=== November 2015 election ===
In the November 2015 general election, the MHP suffered a heavy defeat and halved its parliamentary representation, winning 11.9% of the vote and falling behind the pro-Kurdish Peoples' Democratic Party (HDP) in terms of seats to become the smallest party in Parliament with just 40 MPs. Bahçeli subsequently came under heavy fire for the poor election result, with prominent party members such as Meral Akşener and Sinan Oğan openly declaring their candidacy to succeed Bahçeli. Bahçeli subsequently ruled out any prospect of a resignation and declared that the next leadership election would be held as expected in 2018, three years after the previous Ordinary Congress in March 2015. His decision was unable to quell further unrest within the party, with several provincial and district party associations declaring their support for opposing candidates. the party leadership clamped down on dissident party associations by abolishing them and setting up new ones in their place headed by more loyal party members. In the meantime, Ümit Özdağ and Koray Aydın declared their candidacies.

=== Signatures for an Extraordinary Congress ===
Under the leadership of opposing candidates, delegates critical Bahçeli began collecting signatures to force an Extraordinary Congress. On 15 January 2016, Akşener announced that she had successfully collected over 400 signatures, enough to call a congress. The party leadership staunchly rejected demands for an Extraordinary Congress, resulting in party opposition leaders submitting the signature lists to court. On 19 April, the courts accepted the opposition's call for an Extraordinary Congress. the MHP leadership respected the legal outcome, but stated that they would appeal and not recognise the decision. Following a legal appeal, the courts decided to delay the congress indefinitely while they reviewed the case on 29 April. On 6 May, the courts rejected the MHP leadership's appeal and declared that the congress should go ahead on 15 May.

=== Legal challenges ===
On 13 May, two days before the proposed congress, the appeals from the opposition were accepted by an Ankara court. However at the same time, a court in the Sivas town of Gemerek ruled that the congress would be illegal following a legal challenge by the town's pro-Bahçeli party association. In response to the apparent confusion, Meral Akşener filed a complaint against Gemerek Judge İlhan Işık to the Supreme Board of Judges and Prosecutors (HSYK), accusing the judge of ruling on a case that was beyond the remit of a district court. Although the party opposition declared their intention to hold the congress on Sunday since all legal challenges had been lifted, lawyers at the party's headquarters declared that it would not be legally possible and that the police should stop any attempts by the opposition to do so. Later on the same day, the Ankara court upheld the Germenek court ruling, again putting the congress on hold. One of the leadership candidates, Ümit Özdağ, claimed that the attempts to stop the congress had been initiated by the Minister of Justice.

== First Congress ==
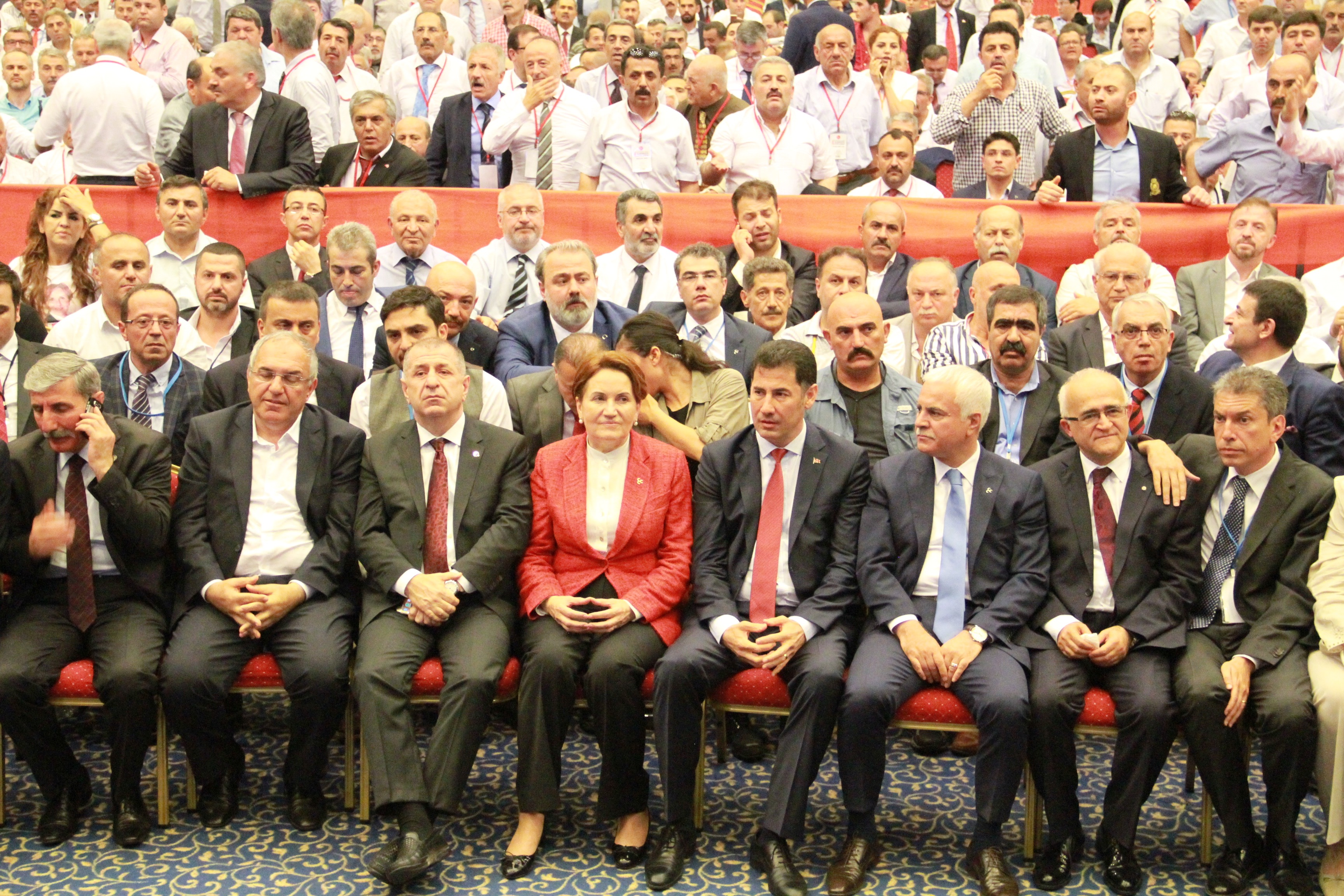
The 19 June extraordinary congress

Following the final decision for the Court of Cassation declaring that the congress should go ahead, the MHP national executive declared that the congress would be held on 26 June or 10 July, with Bahçeli standing as a candidate. However, the inner-party opposition declared that the MHP constitution at the time did not allow a leadership election to be held apart from during the routine ordinary congresses every three years, leading to speculation that the MHP executive were planning to hold the congress and then nullifying the result through court order. The inner-party opposition also argued that the date of the congress would be determined by the judicially appointed invitation committee, not the executive, while the executive argued that such a congress would be unconstitutional since it wasn't held in central Ankara and would require members of the ruling executive to officially be declared valid.

The first Congress of 2016 was held on 19 June 2016 as announced by the invitation committee at the Anatolia Hotel Esenboğa Auditorium in Ankara, starting at 10am. Then incumbent party executives and 38 out of 40 MHP PMs boycotted the Congress, Devlet Bahçeli did not attend the event. The opposition declared 752 delegates attended the congress, but Bahçeli's team announced the attendance is much lower, and the Congress did not meet the delegate threshold. The notary officially announced the attendance as 662, making the Congress valid. After the Congress, the opposition successfully changes 13 out of 14 articles of party constitution, allowing party leader elections during extraordinary congress and preventing party bans after June 5, 2016. The second Congress is planned for 10 July 2016, the same date as Bahçeli's announcement. Three days after the Congress, MHP parliamentary group leader Oktay Vural resigned.

The congress was heavily criticised by one of the leadership candidates, Süleyman Servet Sazak, for revolving almost entirely around the frontrunner Meral Akşener, with the other candidates not having any input in the proposed constitutional changes.

== Potential candidates ==
Although it is not clear if the Congress has authority to elect a new leader, several people publicly disclosed their candidacy.

- Devlet Bahçeli, incumbent Leader of MHP, announced his candidacy on 25 May 2016.
- Meral Akşener, former Minister of the Interior and former Deputy Speaker of the Grand National Assembly, announced her candidacy on 23 April 2016.
  - Meral Akşener established the Good Party after the MHP started supporting the AKP government. She was the candidate of the Good Party in the 2018 Turkish presidential election.
- Sinan Oğan, former Member of the Grand National Assembly, announced his candidacy on 21 November 2015.
  - Sinan Oğan was the Ancestral Alliance's candidate for president of Turkey in the 2023 Turkish presidential election.
- Koray Aydın, former Minister of Public Works and Housing and former Deputy Speaker of the Grand National Assembly, announced his candidacy on 28 November 2015.
  - Koray Aydın joined Meral Akşener's Good Party.
- Ümit Özdağ, former Vice-chairman of the Nationalist Movement Party, announced his candidacy on 23 March 2016.
  - Ümit Özdağ joined Meral Akşener's Good Party, but then founded the Victory Party in 2021.
- Süleyman Servet Sazak, former Vice-chairman of the Nationalist Movement Party, announced his candidacy on 25 May 2016.
- Selim Kaptanoğlu, MHP member, announced his candidacy on 6 November 2015.
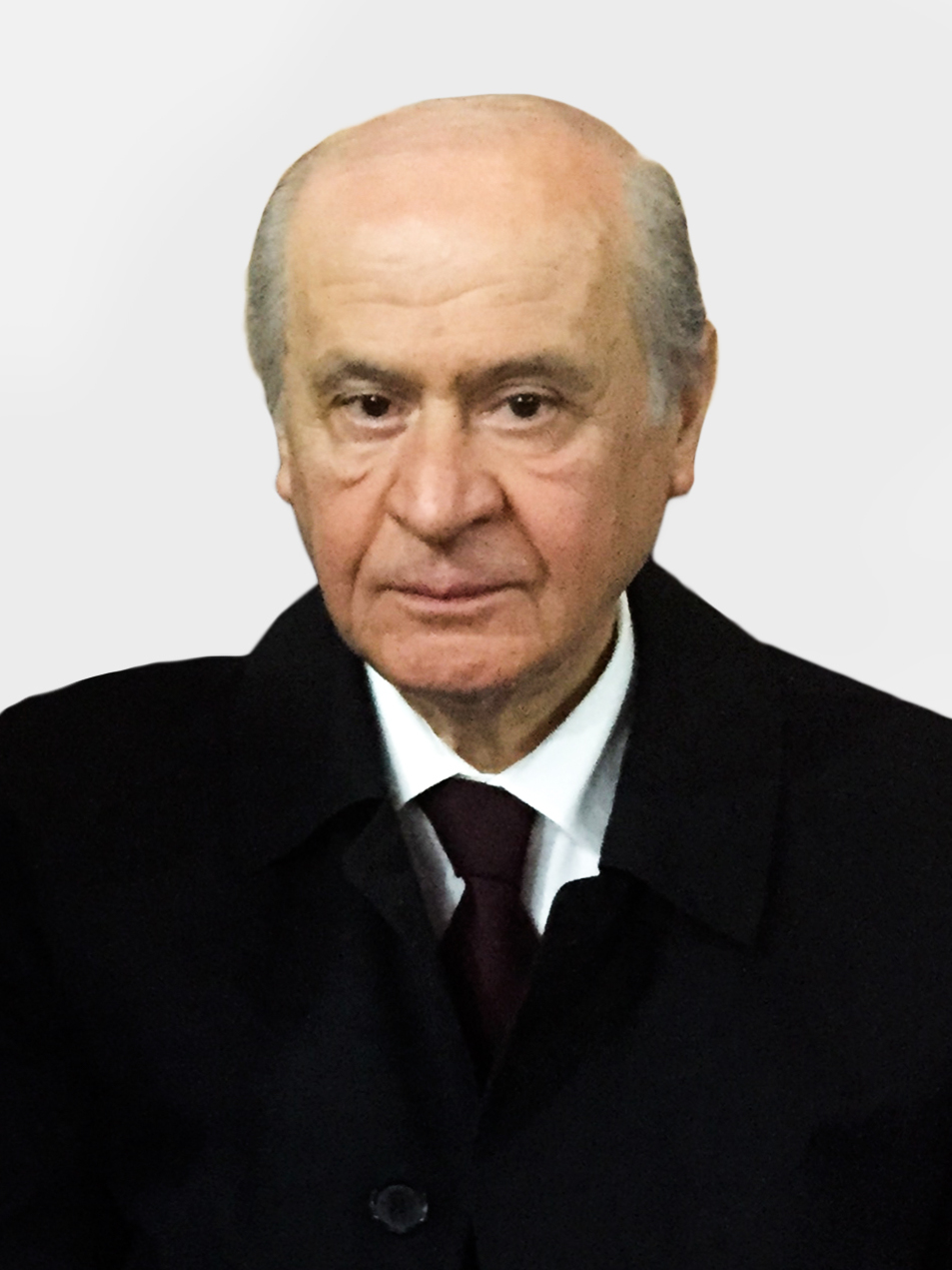
incumbent Leader of MHP
Devlet Bahçeli

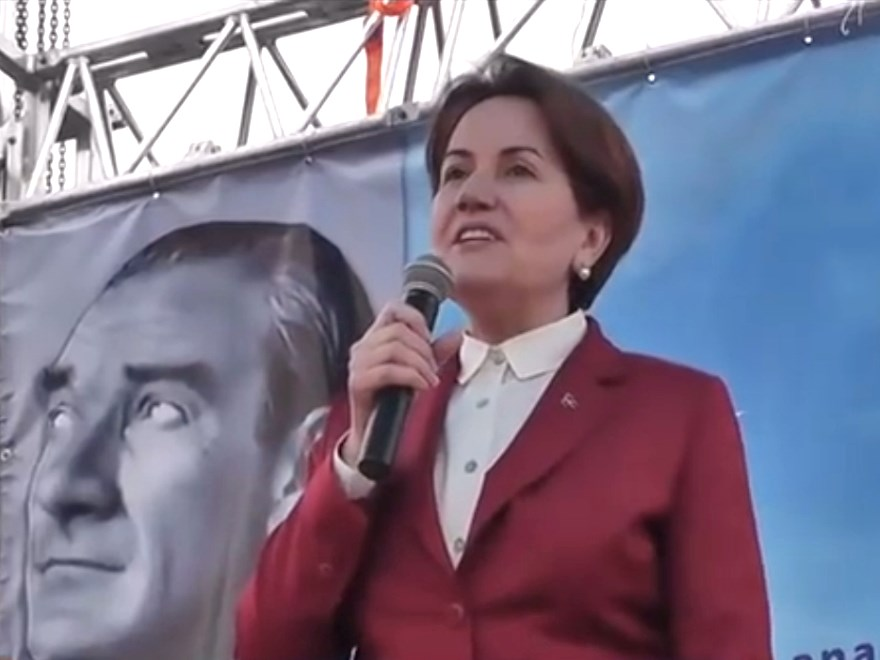
former Minister of the Interior
Meral Akşener

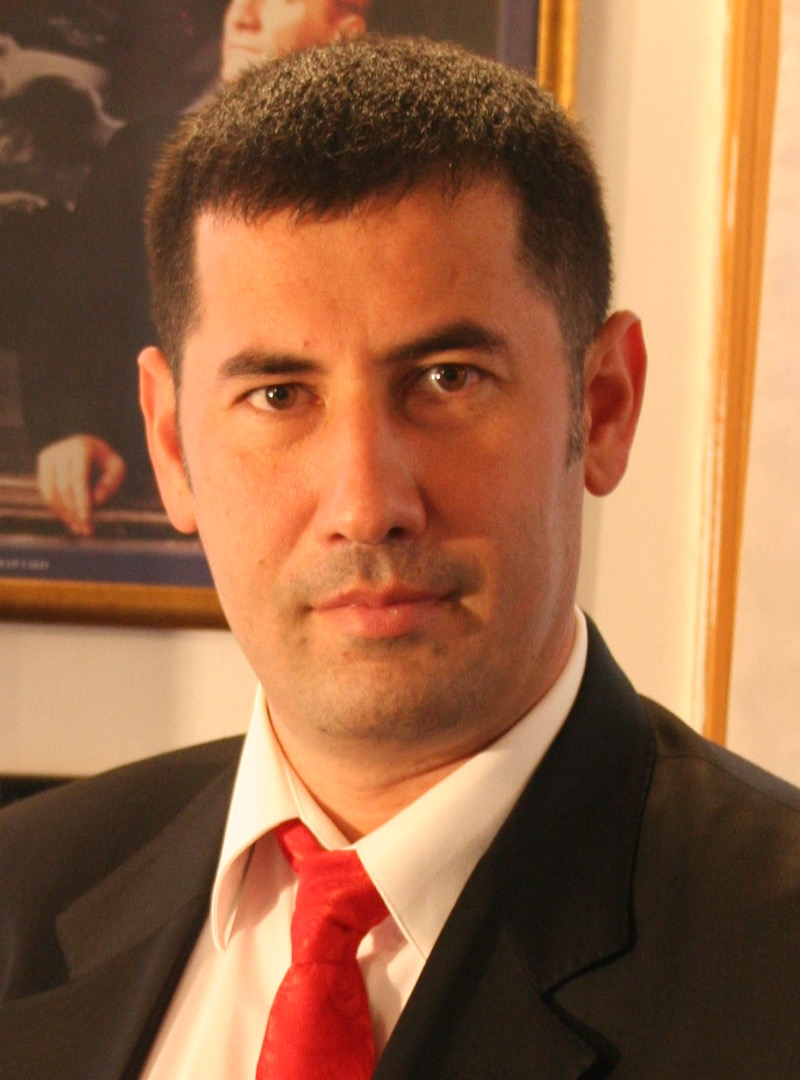
former Member of the Grand National Assembly
Sinan Oğan

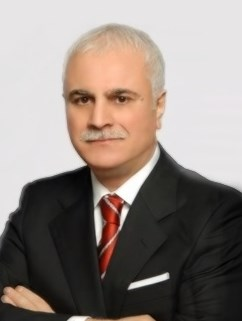
former Minister of Public Works and Housing
Koray Aydın
