= Müsavat Dervişoğlu =

Turkish politician (born 1960)

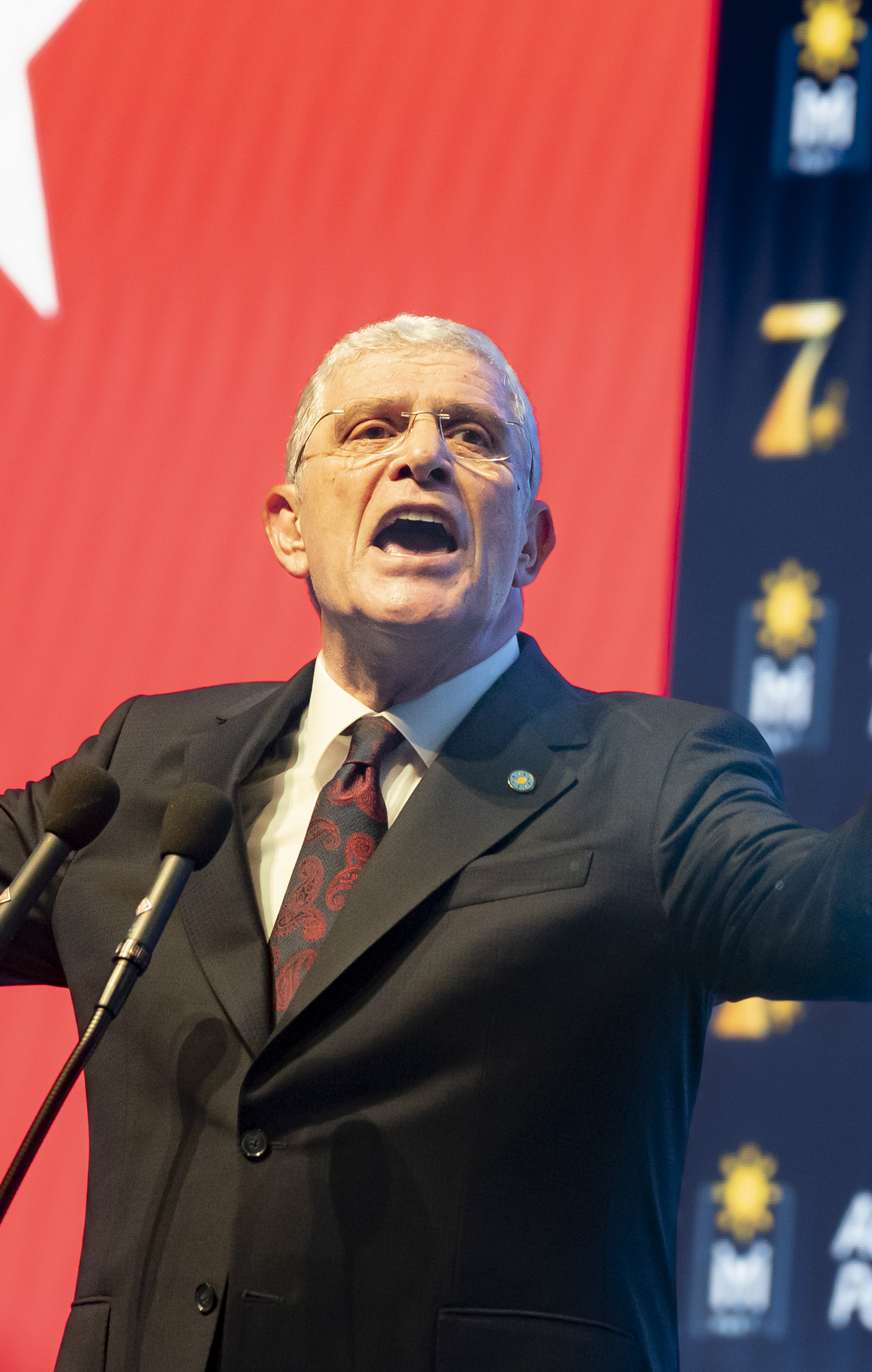

Leader of the İYİ Party
- Incumbent
- Assumed office 1 May 2024
- Preceded by: Meral Akşener

Member of the Grand National Assembly
- Incumbent
- Assumed office 7 July 2018
- Constituency: İzmir (I) (2018, 2023)

Leader of the Grey Wolves
- In office 1987–1989
- Preceded by: Ayhan Acar
- Succeeded by: Ali Metin Tokdemir

Personal details
- Born: 1 February 1960 (age 66) Ankara, Turkey
- Party: Nationalist Task Party (1989–1993); Nationalist Movement Party (1993–2017); Good Party (2017–present)
- Education: Gazi University

Dursun Müsavat Dervişoğlu (born February 1, 1960) is a Turkish businessman, politician and the leader of the Good Party.

== Biography ==
Dervişoğlu was born in Ankara to a family from Fatsa, where he later moved to and studied primary and secondary school in. He completed his high school education in Fatsa, Ankara, and Samsun.

In 1978, he enrolled in the Ankara Academy of Economics and Commercial Sciences, Faculty of Business Administration, Department of Business Administration, but his education was interrupted by the 1980 Turkish coup d'état. Later, he completed his undergraduate education at Gazi University, Faculty of Economics and Administrative Sciences, Department of Business Administration, where relied on student financial aid. He started his career in the Nationalist Task Party (MÇP). He was the Fatsa District president of the Nationalist Youth Association (ÜGD) in 1978, and the Fatsa chairman of the Grey Wolves from 1987 to 1989, and the Youth Culture and Art Hearths Association in 1988. In 1989, he was dismissed from his position in the Youth Culture and Art Hearths Association, and had a position at the MÇP headquarters, given to him by Alparslan Türkeş himself. Then, he was sent to Izmir by Türkeş to serve in the MÇP İzmir Provincial Organization.

He later joined the Nationalist Movement Party and undertook important positions in various levels and youth organizations of the party. He was the MHP İzmir Provincial Chairman between 2000 and 2011, and ran for mayor of Izmir in the 2009 Local elections. In the 2011 general election, he was a candidate for MHP İzmir deputy. He was a candidate for MHP chairman at the MHP congress in 2012, but he could not win.

Between 2018 and 2019, he was the deputy chairman of the Good Party in charge of local administrations. In 2019, he became the deputy chairman of the Good Party parliamentary group and also the 27th term Izmir deputy.

In the Susurluk Report, Kocaeli criminal organization leader Hadi Özcan, who was stated to have a connection with Mehmet Eymür, claimed that Müsavat Dervişoğlu was the right-hand man of Eymür in his statement at the parliament.

Dervişoğlu denied the allegations of Doğu Perinçek who had claimed that Dervişoğlu had tried to assassinate him in the past as part of a job with the MİT.

== Personal life ==
Müsavat Dervişoğlu moved to Izmir in 1991 and works in trade outside of politics. He has one daughter.

Dervişoğlu's name Müsavat means equality in Ottoman Turkish. He has a sibling named 'Hürriyet' (meaning liberty) and another named 'Adalet' (meaning justice). These words collectively make up the Young Turks and their political party CUP's slogan Hürriyet, Müsavat, Adalet or "Liberty, Equality, Justice".
