= Devlet Bahçeli =

Turkish politician (born 1948)

Devlet Bahçeli MP
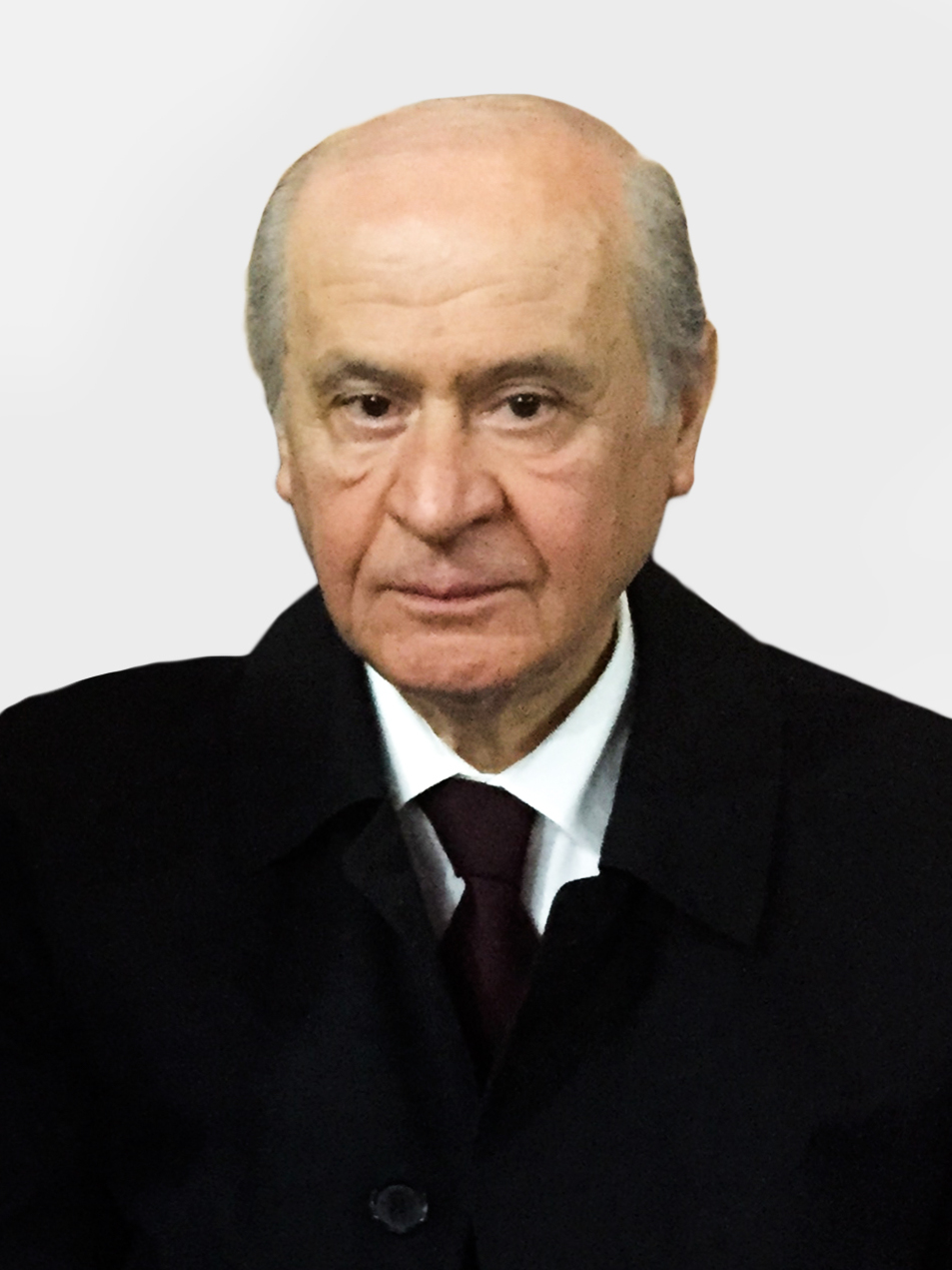
- Bahçeli in 2015

Leader of the Nationalist Movement Party
- Incumbent
- Assumed office 6 July 1997
- Preceded by: Muhittin Çolak (acting)

Deputy Prime Minister of Turkey
- In office 28 May 1999 – 18 November 2002
- Prime Minister: Bülent Ecevit
- Served with: Hüsamettin Özkan; Şükrü Sina Gürel; Cumhur Ersümer; Mesut Yılmaz
- Preceded by: Hikmet Uluğbay
- Succeeded by: Abdüllatif Şener

Interim Speaker of the Grand National Assembly of Turkey
- In office 2 June 2023 – 7 June 2023
- President: Recep Tayyip Erdoğan
- Preceded by: Mustafa Şentop
- Succeeded by: Numan Kurtulmuş

Member of the Grand National Assembly
- Incumbent
- Assumed office 22 July 2007
- Constituency: Osmaniye
- In office 19 April 1999 – 18 November 2002
- Constituency: Osmaniye

Personal details
- Born: 1 January 1948 (age 78) Bahçe, Osmaniye, Turkey
- Party: Nationalist Movement Party
- Education: Gazi University
- Occupation: Politician
- Profession: Economist, academic
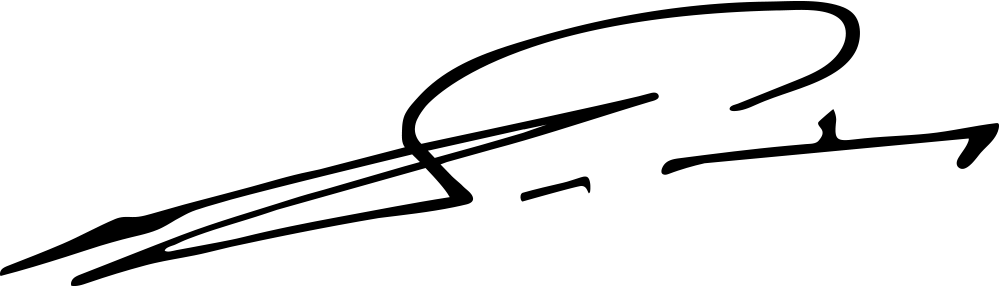
- Signature

Devlet Bahçeli (born 1 January 1948) is a Turkish politician and economist who is the current chairman of the far-right, ultranationalist Nationalist Movement Party (MHP). Bahçeli has been described as a kingmaker in Turkish politics.

An academic in economics from Gazi University, Bahçeli is a founder of the Grey Wolves, and was elected as the chairman of the MHP in the first congress held after the death of Alparslan Türkeş in 1997. He entered Grand National Assembly for the first time in the 1999 general election as a deputy from Osmaniye, taking part as deputy prime minister in the DSP-MHP-ANAP coalition between 1999 and 2002, and ultimately brought the government down. He resigned from his position as chairman when his party fell below the 10% electoral threshold in the 2002 general election, but was re-elected chairman in the 2003 congress. Bahçeli and his party have been serving in the Grand National Assembly since regaining their seats in parliament in the 2007 general election.

Bahçeli was initially a fierce critic of Recep Tayyip Erdoğan throughout the 2000s and 2010s until an intra-party crisis occurred following the MHP's poor performance in the November 2015 general election. With Bahçeli's newfound closeness to Erdoğan after the crisis, a schism occurred in his party which culminated in Meral Akşener founding the Good Party in 2017.

Bahçeli formed an electoral alliance with the Justice and Development Party (AKP) called the People's Alliance for the 2018 general election and maintained this alliance in the 2019 local elections. The MHP currently supports president Erdoğan's cabinet with confidence and supply in the Grand National Assembly.

== Early life ==
Devlet Bahçeli was born on 1 January 1948, in the rural district of Bahçe in the province of Osmaniye. According to his own account, Bahçeli belonged to a well established Turkmen family known as "Fettahoğulları", and is one of the four children of his family, with two siblings from his father's first marriage. According to Hrant Dink, he also has Armenian ancestry, in spite of his fervently anti-Armenian views.

His father, Salih Bahçeli, was one of the well-known farmers and merchants of Osmaniye. His mother's name was Samiye. Devlet's father grew up in a left-wing family, and was a supporter of İsmet İnönü and the Republican People's Party (CHP).

== Education ==
He completed his primary education in his hometown of Osmaniye. Devlet attended secondary school with his elder brother Servet in Adana Private Çukurova College. He lived with his relatives in İstanbul for his high school education and enrolled in Emirgan Akgün College. In his second year of high school, Bahçeli transferred to Private Ata College in Etiler and received his high school diploma from this school. He was accepted into Gazi University in 1967 and graduated from its Foreign Trade Department in 1971. Among his classmates were future political rival Kemal Kılıçdaroğlu, who Bahçeli called "my classmate" in numerous occasions and former football referee Erman Toroğlu.

Bahçeli worked as an assistant in the department of economics at Gazi University and affiliated high schools in 1972. During this period he was one of the founders of the Idealist Association of Financiers and Economists, and one of the founders and chairman of the Association of University Academy and Schools Assistants (UMID-BIR). He also founded and was leader of the University Academy and Schools Assistantship Association (ÜNAY). He received his doctorate in economics from Gazi University Institute of Social Sciences and continued lecturing in the department of economic policy at the Faculty of Economics and Administrative Sciences of the same university until 1987. Dr. Bahçeli was also interested in Turkish history, economics, and foreign policy while working for his degree.

== Early political career ==
In his youth, Bahçeli attended Alparslan Türkeş's seminars, chairman of the Republican Villagers Nation Party, the predecessor of the Nationalist Movement Party (MHP). While he was still a student at Gazi University in 1967, he worked as the founder and manager of the Grey Wolves. He served as the general secretary of the Turkish National Student Union between 1970 and 1971.

After the 1980 coup, Bahçeli defended executives and members of the MHP and other nationalist organizations who were imprisoned. Bahçeli resigned from his teaching position in 1987, when Türkeş requested his involvement in party politics, and was elected general secretary of the Nationalist Task Party (MÇP) in their 1987 congress. Bahçeli served in several positions in the upper echelons of the MÇP and the MHP at various times.

== Leader of the MHP ==
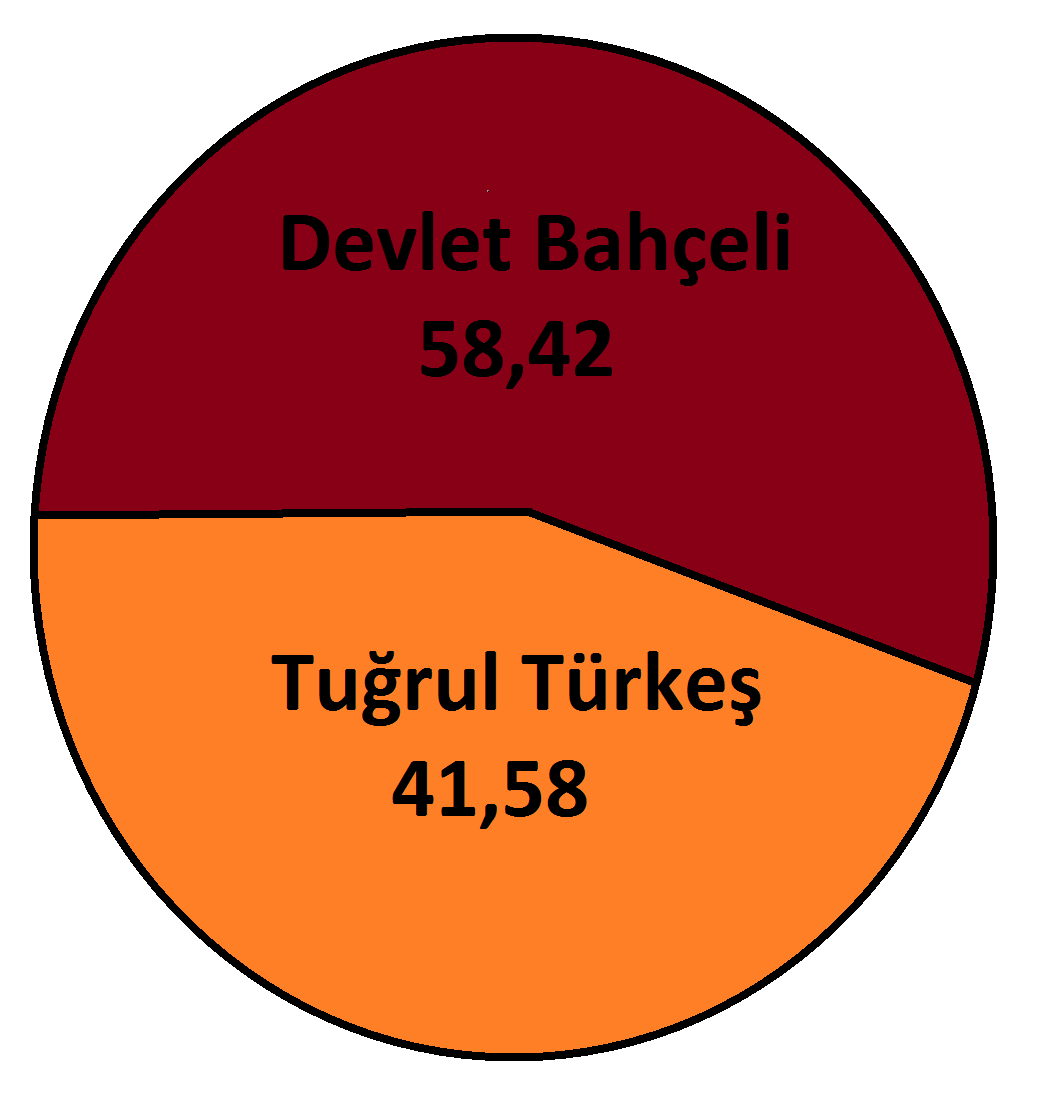
Result of the 5th extraordinary congress

After the death of Alparslan Türkeş in May 1997, an Extraordinary Congress was held, in which Bahçeli contested Alparslan's son Tuğrul Türkeş for the chairmanship. In the following hours of the congress, all candidates except Türkeş withdrew from the candidacy in favor of Bahçeli. However the congress was postponed due to a fight between the two nationalists and their supporters. At another extraordinary congress held in July, Devlet Bahçeli won the run-off election against Tuğrul Türkeş and was elected the new chairman of the MHP.

=== Deputy prime minister ===
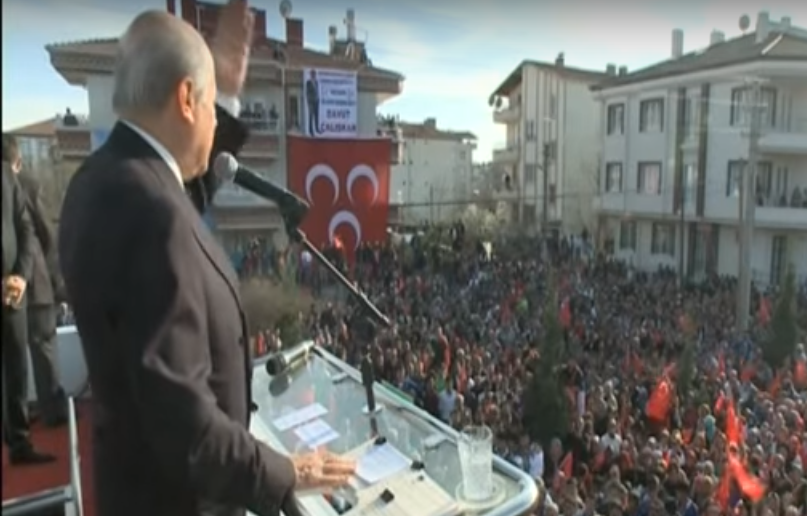
Devlet Bahçeli speaking at Aksaray 25 March 2014

With a new leader, the MHP increased its vote share from 8.18% to 17.98% in the 1999 election, its highest vote rate in its history and became the second largest party. Devlet Bahçeli served as a deputy prime minister in the subsequent coalition government (DSP-Motherland-MHP) of Bülent Ecevit. Bahçeli announced on 7 July 2002 of his withdrawal of support for the government, calling for new elections to be held on 3 November, and campaigned for fixing Turkey's economy in the lead up to the general election. However, the MHP was expelled from parliament for not passing the 10% electoral threshold in the 2002 election, polling 8%. Bahçeli resigned his chairmanship, announcing "I am the only one responsible for the failure", but was reelected in the party's 2003 congress in a competition between Ramiz Ongun, Koray Aydın, and Aytekin Yıldırım.

=== Opposition ===
Bahçeli was again re-elected as the MHP chairman in a congress held on 19 November 2006. In the 2007 general election, he and his party reentered parliament, receiving 14.27% of the votes. Bahçeli campaigned in the 2011 general election promising 7% GDP growth and a change in electoral laws. The MHP's vote share decreased to 13%. Bahçeli was re-elected as the chairman in party congresses held in 2012 and 2015.

The slogan of the election campaign used by the MHP for the June 2015 general election was "Bizimle yürü Türkiye!" (Walk with us, Turkey!) The party increased their vote more than 3%, bringing it to 16.29%. The election produced a hung parliament, so the AKP, CHP, MHP, and HDP parties engaged in coalition talks. The CHP leader Kemal Kılıçdaroğlu offered Bahçeli the premiership for a CHP-MHP minority government, but he ruled out the offer. He instead called on the CHP and the AKP to form a grand coalition, and that he should become main opposition leader. When the CHP negotiations failed with the AKP, President Recep Tayyip Erdoğan called another election. When campaigning for the election held on 1 November 2015, the MHP's position faltered and it received less than 12% of the votes.

=== MHP congress controversy (2015–2017) ===
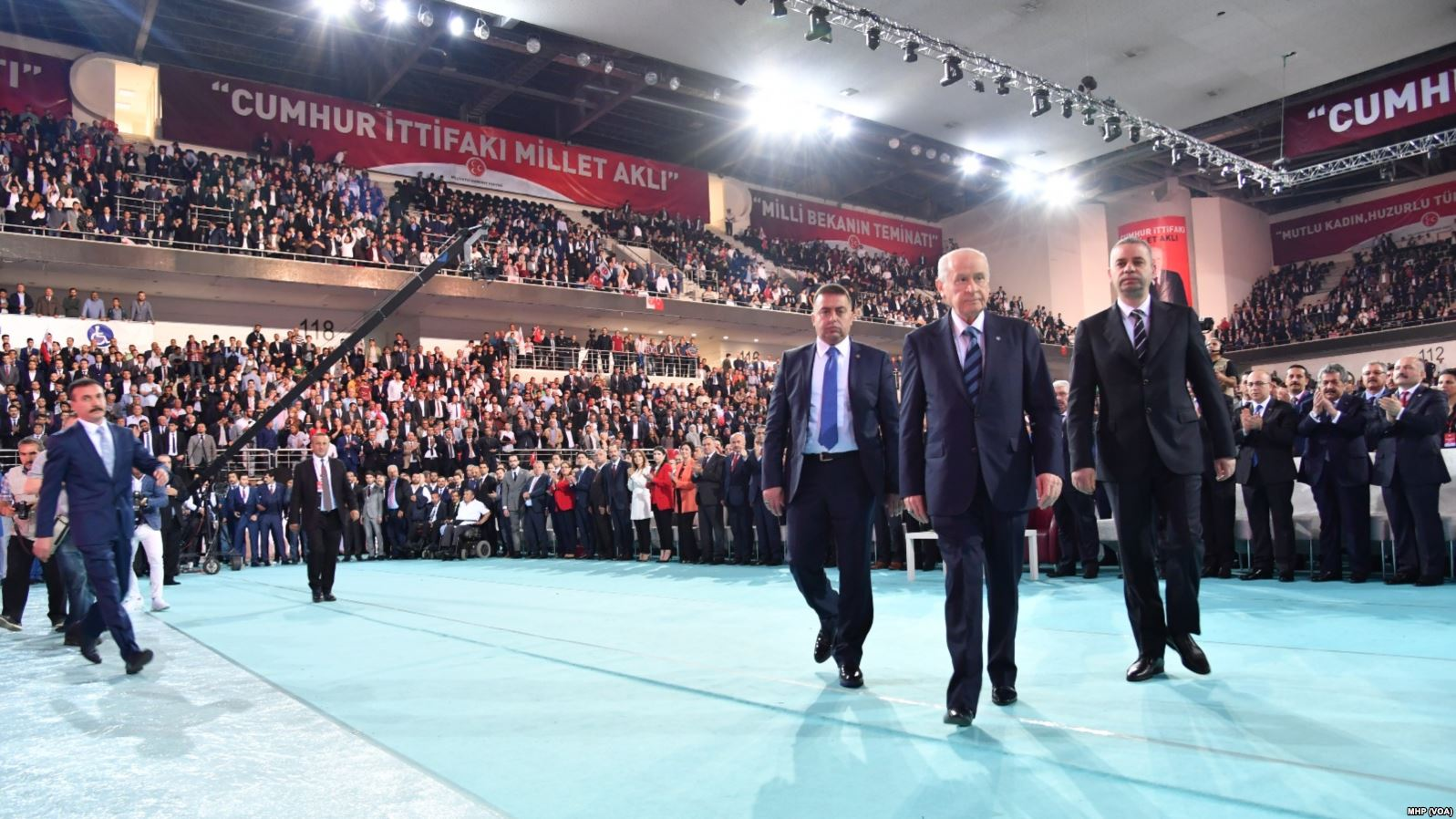
Bahçeli announcing his party's manifesto for 2018 general election

Following MHP's defeat in the 2015 election, high ranking party members demanded Bahçeli's resignation as chairman. When he refused, 547 delegates put forward their demands to convene an extraordinary congress. Important names such as Meral Akşener, Sinan Oğan, and Koray Aydın called for a congress and announced that they were candidates for the chairmanship, however Bahçeli rejected the calls for an extraordinary congress and announced 18 March 2018 as the date of a regular congress. A lawsuit was filed by Bahçeli's opposition on the grounds that their demands were not met and that the party be taken to an extraordinary congress. The party leadership requested the Constitutional Court to make a decision. The court ruled in favor of Bahçeli's opponents, mandating the MHP to convene an extraordinary congress with the Supreme Court unanimously approving the decision. The 6th Extraordinary Grand Congress of the MHP convened on 19 June 2016 with the participation of six candidates who declared their candidacy against Bahçeli. In the congress, which was officially a bylaws convention, it was confirmed that a number of amendments to the party's charter had been decided on, even though the headquarters claimed otherwise. With the amendment proposals accepted in the congress, 13 articles in the party bylaws were renewed. Among the amendments, an article in the MHP's charter which prevented the election of chairmen in extraordinary congresses was changed to allow so. However the execution of the decisions reached in the convention was stopped with the decision of the Court of Cassation. Following this decision of the Supreme Court of Appeals, Akşener filed a complaint with the Supreme Election Council (YSK) for 'complete unlawfulness' regarding the rejection of the request for an extraordinary congress with elections.

Names such as Meral Akşener, Yusuf Halaçoğlu and Ümit Özdağ were soon expelled from the MHP with the decision of the MHP Disciplinary Committee. On 25 October 2017 Good Party was founded by the MHP expellees under the leadership of Akşener.

=== People's Alliance ===
Bahçeli supported President Recep Tayyip Erdoğan in the 2017 constitutional amendment referendum.

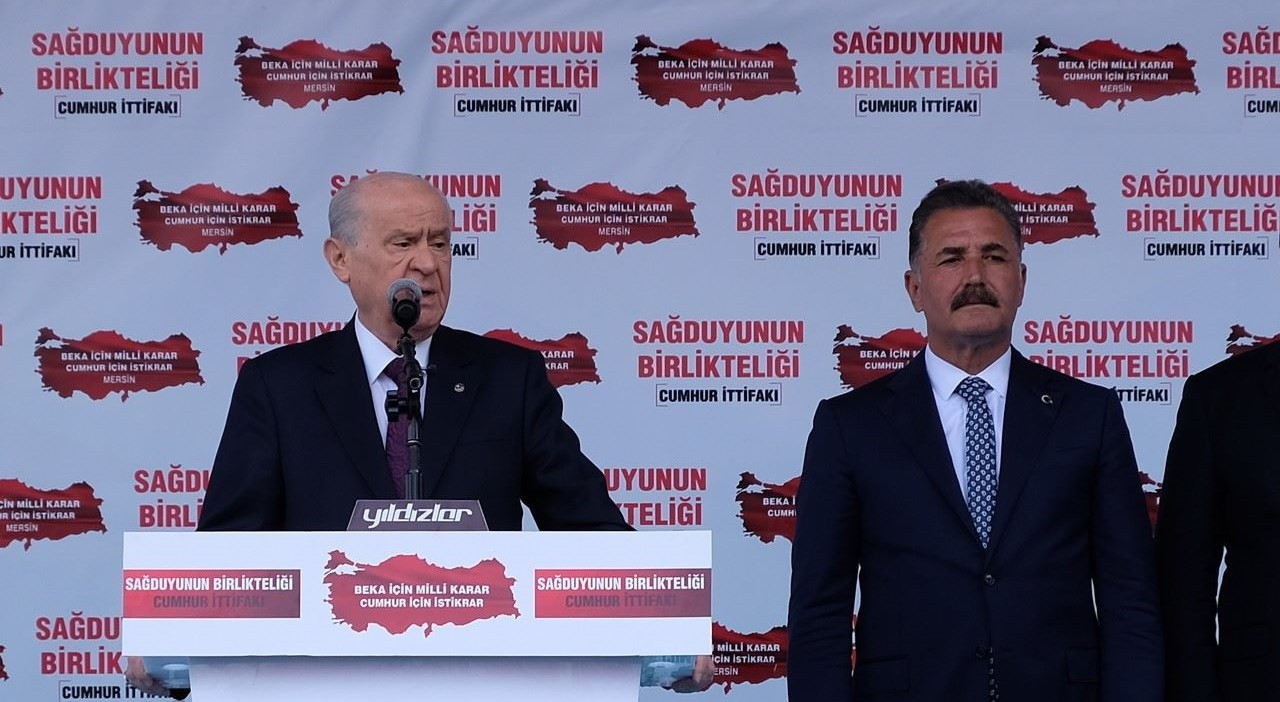
Devlet Bahçeli in Mersin campaigning in support of MHP mayoral candidate Hamit Tuna

In 2018, an electoral alliance between the AKP and MHP called the People's Alliance was established in preparation for that year's general election. A law was then passed enabling political parties to form alliances in elections. Bahçeli stated that he was not running for president and that the MHP would support Erdoğan's candidacy. Erdoğan was reelected president, and the MHP received 11% of the votes and 49 deputies entered the parliament. Bahçeli congratulated Erdoğan for the victory and declared that his party had achieved a historical success. The MHP has since been giving confidence and supply to an AKP minority government.

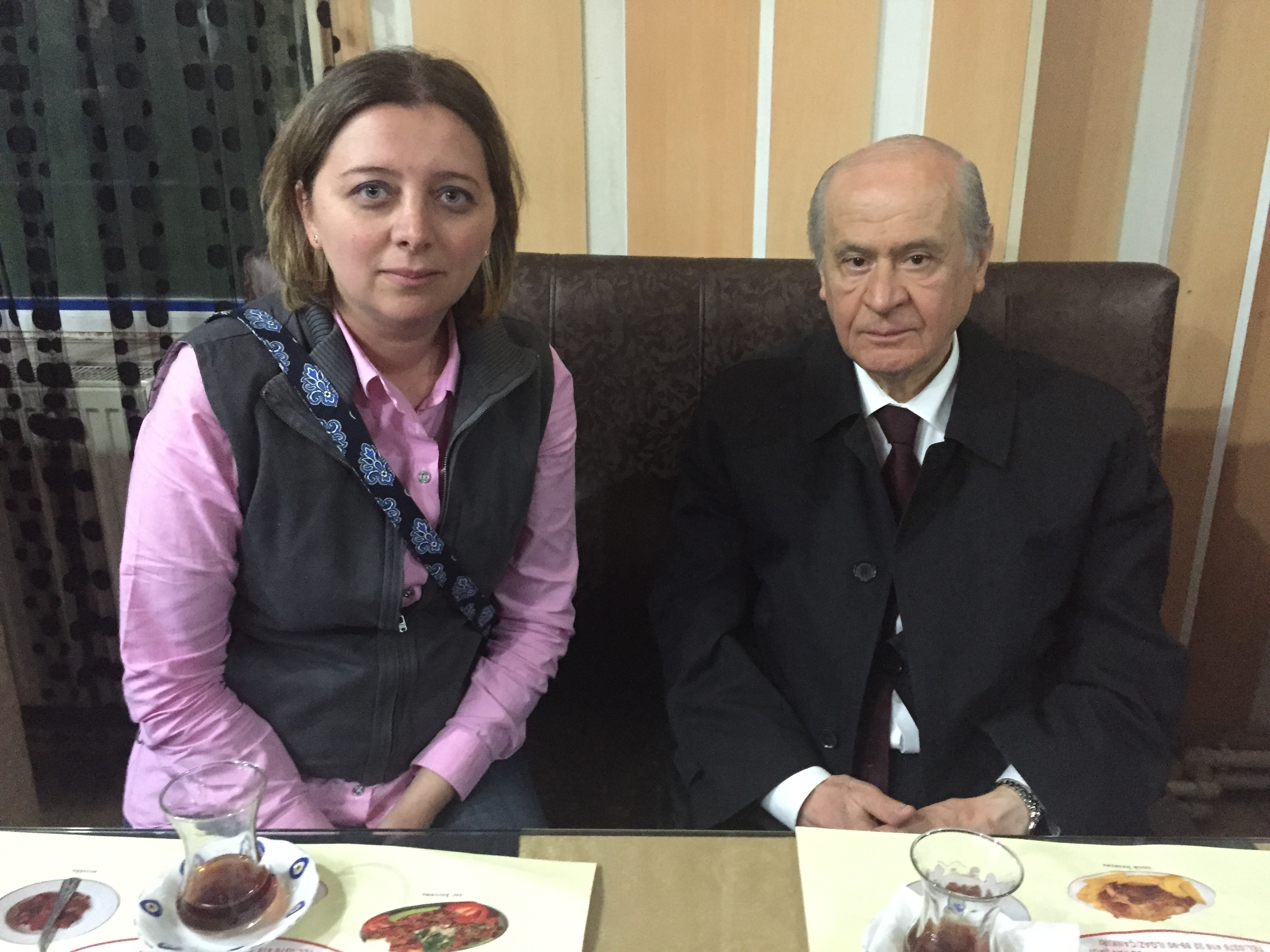
Bahçeli with Voice of America reporter Yıldız Yazıcıoğlu

In the 2019 local elections, the MHP again entered the elections under the umbrella of the People's Alliance. The party did not nominate candidates for the İstanbul, Ankara and İzmir mayoralties and supported the candidates nominated by the AKP, while the AKP did not nominate a candidate for mayor in Adana, Mersin, Manisa, Kırklareli and Osmaniye. The MHP won the mayorships of Amasya, Kastamonu, Kütahya, Çankırı, Erzincan, Bayburt, Bartın and Karabük provinces. Bahçeli has been re-elected as the MHP chairman in the congresses held in 2018 and 2021.

From 2–7 June 2023, due to being the oldest member, Bahçeli became the temporary speaker of the 28th Grand National Assembly.

=== Speeches ===
Bahçeli's gaffes during his speeches and malapoprisms are well-known in Turkish politics, and comparable to Bushisms and Chernomyrdinka. His pronunciation of the word "biscuit" once went viral. On another occasion, a speech he made during the 2009 local elections campaign, which coincided with the 40th anniversary of the MHP, became a meme:

When writing 2009, there are two zeros. The zero next to 9 is on the left, you erase it. Is there a 9 left? There is a zero next to 2. You erase it, too. Is there a 2 left? Add them together. What will it make? It makes 11. You erase both of two zeroes in 2009, what is there left? 29 is left. Add 11 and 29! It makes 40, and the 40th anniversary of the Nationalist Movement Party!

== Political positions ==
He is critical of the pro-Kurdish Peoples Democratic Party (HDP), which he demands to be banned. When the Constitutional Court turned down an indictment for the banning of the party, he demanded the closure of the court. In October 2024, Bahçeli suggested offering Kurdistan Workers Party (PKK) leader Abdullah Öcalan parole if the latter renounced violence and disbanded his group.

=== Foreign policy ===
In 2015 a Uyghur-staffed, Turkish-owned Chinese restaurant was assaulted by Turkish nationalists; they also attacked the Dutch consulate, mistaking it for the Russian consulate, and assaulted several South Korean tourists, believing them to be Chinese. Devlet Bahçeli said that the attacks by MHP affiliated Turkish youth on South Korean tourists was "understandable", telling the Turkish news paper Hürriyet that: "What is the difference between a Korean and a Chinese anyway? They both have slitty eyes. Does it make any difference?"

After an amassing of Greek and Turkish troops at the border amid rising tensions between the two countries, Bahçeli accused Greek defense minister Panos Kammenos of being mentally ill, proclaiming that he should "visit a clinic" among other insults.

Following the recognition of the Armenian genocide by the German Parliament, Bahçeli has stated that the deportations of Armenians were "absolutely correct" and should be repeated if a similar event occurs. He has also glorified the Three Pashas, perpetrators of the Armenian genocide, on numerous occasions. After Joe Biden became the first US President to officially acknowledge the Armenian genocide on 24 April 2021, Bahçeli threatened Armenians living in Turkey, Turkish leftists, and Turkish citizens who recognized the genocide, with death, stating "When you look at us, we will make sure that you will see Talaat, Enver Pasha, and Mustafa Kemal Atatürk." He also denied that there were any genocides or massacres in Turkey's history.

Bahçeli accused Russia of murdering Turkish soldiers who were attacked by Russian fighter planes in 2017. He said: "Russia shoots our soldiers, then disgusts them. This is a mistaken, shameful, international law said to count." In March 2022, after the Russian invasion of Ukraine, he urged Russia to "stop the invasion immediately", adding that "the attempt to take Donbas away from Ukraine is separatism." In September 2025, he proposed an alliance between Turkey, China and Russia to counter the United States-Israel alliance.

== Controversies ==
=== Rhetoric against critics and institutions ===
In 2020, he called for the Turkish Medical Association (TTB) to be shut down after it criticized the government pandemic policies. Prominent figures, including TTB members, publicly criticized him and MHP's Adana targeted a professor who had objected. He has also attacked opposition figures and protestors in strong terms, for example calling a Cumhuriyet columnist and CHP lawyer, Mustafa Balbay, an enemy of the state and nation from the MHP's parliament podium.

=== Accusations of inciting violence against journalists ===
In January 2021, two journalists and a politician were assaulted in Ankara. One of the journalists was a former head of the Grey Wolves, the ultranationalist group linked to the MHP. Bahçeli rejected the claim that he incited the attacks, calling it a cheap provocation. His deputy chair said afterwards that the party had many hotheads who wouldn't wait for orders.

In 2023, columnist Memduh Bayraktaroglu filed charges against him after an attempted raid on his home, citing threatening messages and holding him responsible for inciting it.

=== Ties to organized crime and defense of Süleyman Soylu ===
During the 2021 Sedat Peker allegations, Bahçeli publicly backed Interior Minister Süleyman Soylu, calling the accusations a lynching attempt and character assassination. Duvar English described him as a close friend of mafia leader Alaattin Çakıcı.

=== Reversal on Abdullah Öcalan and the PPK peace process ===
In October 2024, he said the imprisoned PPK leader could address parliament to declare the end of terrorism. This shocked many because in 2007 he had thrown a noose at a rally to demand Öcalan's execution. İYİ Party leader Müsavat Dervişoğlu responded by repeating the noose gesture and accusing the parties involved in forming a "non national consensus front".

=== Statements on the İmamoğlu case and protests ===
After Istanbul Mayor Ekrem İmamoğlu’s arrest in March 2025, Bahçeli accused the CHP of staging a war of violence and evil against the republic and described the mass protests as a fascistic uprising. Critics saw this as defending a politically motivated prosecution, while his supporters say he was defending the rule of law against street pressure.

=== Diplomatic spat ===
In December 2025, Turkey's Foreign Ministry called a statement from the Barazani headquarters spokesperson targeting Bahçeli unacceptable and demanded that the KDP leadership take action against those responsible.

== Personal life ==
Bahçeli is unmarried. He supported the football team Beşiktaş until 2023, but canceled his membership in the club after fans demanded the government to resign over its deficient response to the earthquake in February 2023 during its match against Konyaspor.

He has close ties to mafia boss Alaettin Çakıcı whom he visited in prison, and for whom he demanded a general amnesty. The demand was denied by Erdoğan.

On February 6, 2025, Devlet Bahçeli was hospitalized for a planned heart valve replacement surgery due to a degeneration in the valve he had replaced a decade prior.

== Works ==
- 2011 Seçim Beyannamesi
- Türkiye Gündemi ve Genelgeler
- Gizli Gündemler "Demokrasi, Özgürlük, Anayasa"
- Millet ve Devlet Bekası İçin Güç Birliği
- Referanduma Doğru İstanbul'da Bayramlaşma
- Ülkü ve Şuur
- Bölücü Terörün Siyasallaşma Süreci (Yıkım Projesi)
- Bin Yıllık Kardeşliği "Yaşa ve Yaşat" Mitingi
- "Var Ol Türkiye" MHP 9. Olağan Büyük Kurultayı
- Çözülen Ülke Türkiye ve Tavrımız
- Çözülen Ülke Türkiye ve Ülkümüz
- MHP 40. Yıl - Bir Hilal Uğruna
- Ortak Akılda Buluşma
- Siyasi Hayat ve Normalleşme Süreci
- Yönetilmeyen Türkiye "Kutuplaşma, Kargaşa ve Kaos"
- Teslimiyet ve Açılım Siyaseti "Demokrasi, Ekonomi, Güvenlik"
- Terör Kıskacında Türkiye: Tarihi Uyarı
