= Good Party =

Nationalist political party in Turkey

Good Party İYİ Parti
- Abbreviation: İYİ Parti (official); İYİ, İYİP, İyi Parti (unofficial)
- Spokesperson: Buğra Kavuncu
- Chairperson: Müsavat Dervişoğlu
- General Secretary: Osman Ertürk Özel
- Parliamentary Leader: Müsavat Dervişoğlu
- Treasurer: Turan Yaldır
- Founder: Meral Akşener
- Founded: 25 October 2017
- Split from: Nationalist Movement Party (MHP)
- Headquarters: 2120. Cadde No: 9 Çankaya, Ankara
- Youth wing: Good Youth
- Membership (2026): ▼385,025
- Ideology: Kemalism; Turkish nationalism; National conservatism; Pro-Europeanism
- Political position: Centre-right to right-wing
- National affiliation: Nation Alliance (2018–2023)
- European affiliation: Alliance of Liberals and Democrats for Europe (in the Council of Europe)
- Colors: Yellow and turquoise
- Slogan: Türkiye İYİ olacak! ('Turkey Will Be Good!')
- Grand National Assembly: 27 / 600
- Provinces: 1 / 51
- District municipalities: 12 / 922
- Belde Municipalities: 3 / 390
- Provincial councilors: 14 / 1,282
- Municipal Assemblies: 476 / 20,953

Party flag

Website
- iyiparti.org.tr

The Good Party (Turkish: İyi Parti) is a nationalist, Kemalist and conservative political party in Turkey, established on 25 October 2017 by Meral Akşener. According to Meral Akşener, the letters İYİ are a reference to the tamga of the Kayı tribe which also represents the party's name and flag. The party's official name is İyi Parti (Good party) and official abbreviation is İYİ Parti.

The party was formed as a result in a split by prominent former members of Turkey's Nationalist Movement Party (MHP) and later joined by some former members of the main opposition Republican People's Party (CHP). The party's founder and chairperson, Meral Akşener, and its deputy chairperson, Koray Aydın, are both former members of the MHP before establishing the party. Plans to form a new party emerged amongst prominent MHP defectors after the MHP's support for a 'Yes' vote in the controversial 2017 constitutional referendum, as well as a failed attempt to unseat the party's governing leader. In addition to endorsing a more moderate civic nationalism as opposed to the ardent ethnic nationalism of the MHP, the party runs on an anti-establishment platform criticising both the governing and opposition parties in Turkey for their ineffectiveness. The party describes itself as being in the centre of political spectrum though third-party sources have described the party as being centre-right or on the right-wing of the political spectrum.

It puts a particular emphasis on the restoration of the parliamentary system and the integrity of the judiciary and other institutions. The party has been widely described as an anti-Erdoğanist alternative for right-leaning voters disillusioned with both the Nationalist Movement Party (MHP) and the governing Justice and Development Party (AKP).

== History ==
=== MHP leadership challenge ===
Meral Akşener, a former Minister of the Interior who served from 1996 to 1997, was a prominent member of parliament from the Nationalist Movement Party (MHP) from 2007 to November 2015, having been a member of the centre-right True Path Party (DYP) during her ministerial career. Her relation with MHP leader Devlet Bahçeli became noticeably strained after Bahçeli refused to nominate her for another term as Deputy Speaker of the Grand National Assembly after the June 2015 general election, a post she had held since 2007. Bahçeli eventually withdrew her parliamentary nomination before the November 2015 snap election, resulting in her losing her parliamentary seat.

The MHP, having won 16.29% of the vote and 80 seats in June 2015, suffered a heavy defeat in the November snap election with just 11.90% of the vote and 40 seats. The loss was widely blamed on Bahçeli's refusal to consider any coalition agreement after the June 2015 election resulted in a hung parliament. The significant loss resulted in MHP dissidents including Akşener launching a drive to unseat Bahçeli from the party's leadership, a process made difficult by the party's strict bylaws. Other prominent MHP dissidents who declared their candidacy for the leadership included Ümit Özdağ, Koray Aydın and Sinan Oğan. Özdağ and Aydın would eventually join Akşener in forming the İYİ Party, as did prominent MHP dissident MPs Yusuf Halaçoğlu, İsmail Ok and Nuri Okutan.

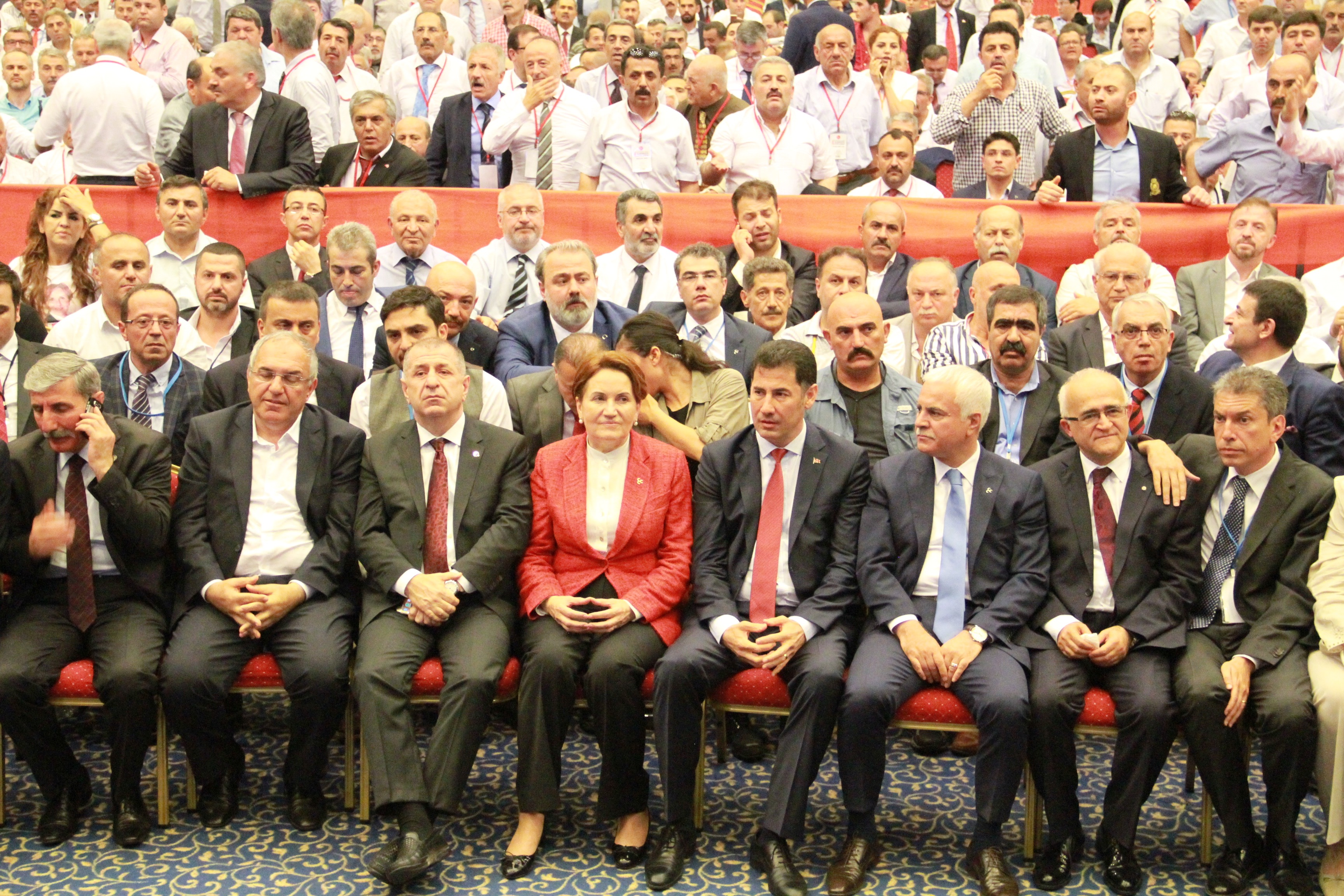
MHP dissidents including Akşener hold an extraordinary congress, eventually nullified by the courts

With several MHP delegates supporting the dissidents' drive for a fresh leadership election, Akşener and the other leadership candidates joined forces to hold a constitutional convention, claiming they had the right to do so due to surpassing the required number of delegate signatures required. The MHP leadership boycotted the congress and declared it illegal, taking the process to court. The courts eventually upheld the claim that enough signatures had been submitted and forced the MHP leadership to hold a congress. In a controversial move, another court and the Supreme Electoral Council of Turkey (YSK) both struck down the ruling and asked the MHP leadership to not hold a congress. The move was widely seen as an interference in the judicial process and inner-party democracy by the governing Justice and Development Party (AKP) and the Ministry of Justice, which both had an interest in keeping the increasingly cooperative Bahçeli as MHP leader and preventing Akşener from mounting a challenge to the government. Akşener and several other dissidents were expelled from the party in the following months, mounting unsuccessful challenges against their suspensions. The constitutional convention held in June 2016 was annulled by the courts in January 2017.

=== 2017 constitutional referendum ===
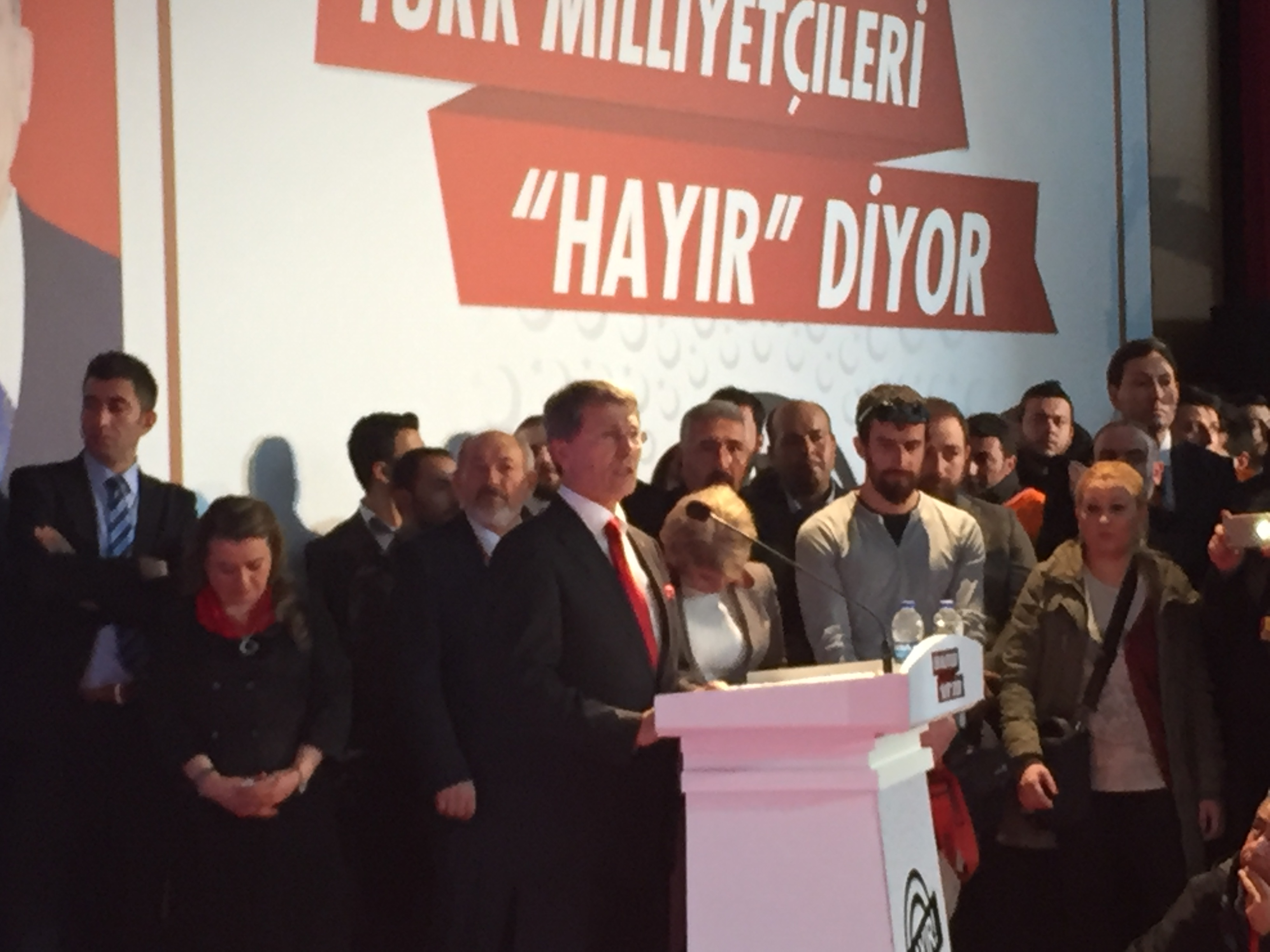
MHP dissidents hold a 'No' campaign event for the 2017 constitutional referendum

In December 2016, the governing AKP and opposition MHP agreed to put forward a joint constitutional amendment proposal that would change Turkey's parliamentary system into an executive presidency. The MHP's support for the proposals came as a surprise given the party's historically staunch opposition to an executive presidency. Many MHP members and prominent dissidents refused to support the party leadership and began their own 'No' campaigns. Polls and dissident politicians predicted that between 70 and 90% of MHP voters would defect from their party's official position and vote 'No'.

Akşener, Okutan, Halaçoğlu and Özdağ all became prominent 'No' campaigners, with many political commentators seeing the alliance as a signal of a forthcoming new political party united under Akşener's leadership. The referendum was very controversial due to a last-minute change in the ballot counting procedure by the Supreme Electoral Council, causing the dissident nationalists and other 'No' campaigners to allege fraud and not recognise the results. According to official results, the 'No' side lost with 48.6% of the vote to 'Yes's 51.4%, though Akşener alleged that the actual result was a victory for 'No' by a margin of 52–48%.

=== Party preparations ===
Following the 2017 Turkish constitutional referendum, it was announced that MHP dissidents would unite under a new party led by Akşener, with the party's official announcement expected in September or October 2017. During its preparation period, the party was touted as a 'nationalist conservative' alternative to the MHP and the AKP, while endorsing the principles of Mustafa Kemal Atatürk. The party was also described to be strictly centrist. During the establishment preparations, the names of 'Centrist Democrat Party' (Merkez Demokrat Parti) and 'Mainland Party' (Anayurt Partisi) were alleged to have been selected.

=== Formation ===
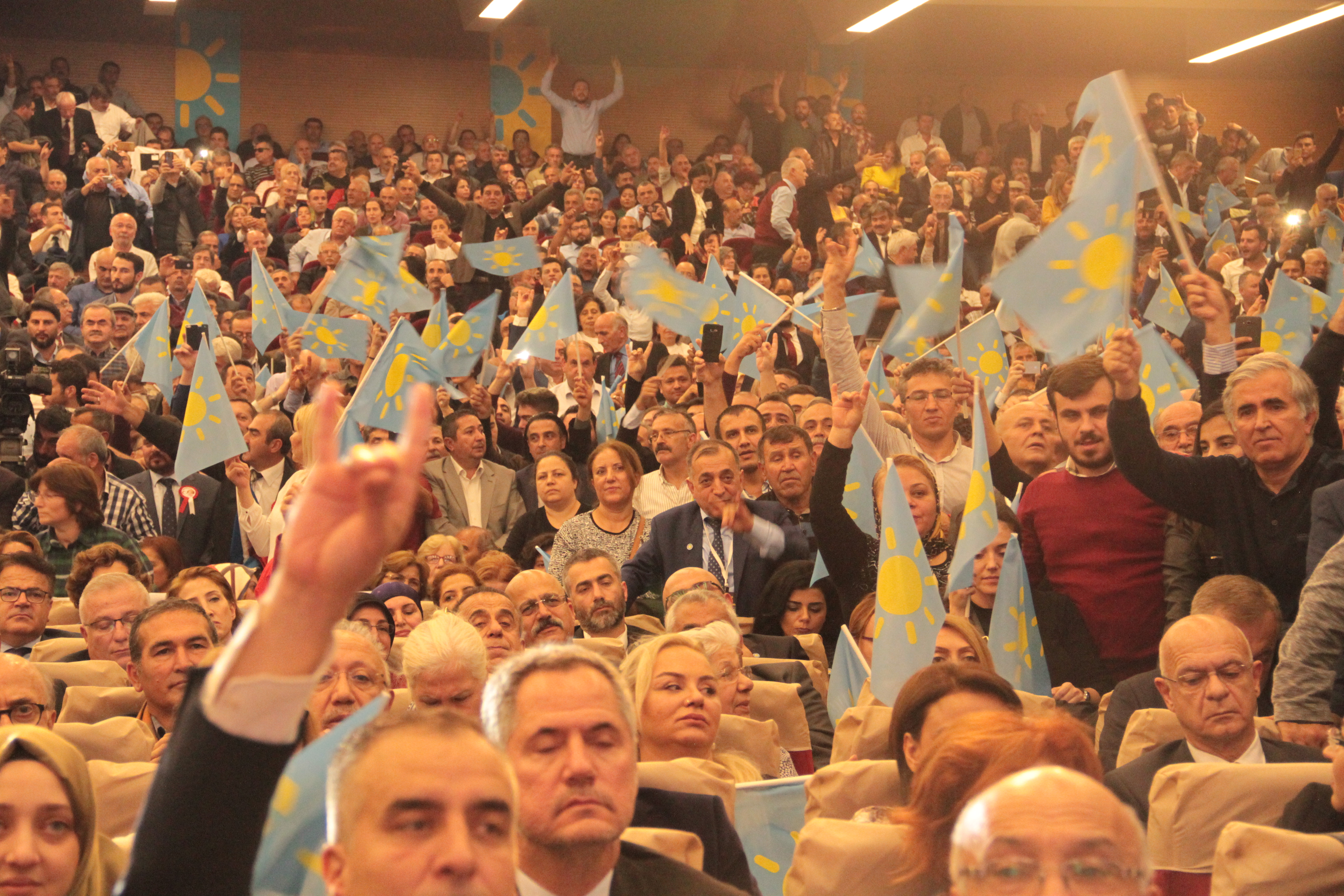
İYİ Party supporters at the party's launch event, 25 October 2017

The Kayı tribe flag from which the party takes its name

The party was announced at a congress at the Nâzım Hikmet Cultural Centre in Ankara on 25 October 2017. On that day, the party's name, logo and slogan were revealed to the public. Meral Akşener was formally elected as the party's first leader—unopposed, carrying all votes.

==== Legal disputes and challenges ====
The party's name, logo and slogan were immediately subject to legal challenges and controversy, with allegations that they bore resemblance to AKP Antalya Mayor Menderes Türel's 2014 local election campaign. Türel issued a statement claiming that he owned the patents as of 24 October 2015. The AKP Mayor of Bilecik, Selim Yağcı, threatened legal action alleging that the logo was stolen from the official seal of Bilecik Province. The Kayı tribe Association also announced legal challenges, claiming that they had the patent to the flag since 2014. A former AKP mayoral candidate alleged that the party's slogan belonged to him and threatened legal challenges if the party refused to stop using it.

=== 2018 elections ===
The party quickly gained five members of parliament in the Grand National Assembly who were originally elected for other parties, and numerous provincial and municipal council members that also defected from their former parties. On 22 April 2018, in the run-up to general elections, a further 15 MPs from the CHP moved to the İYİ Party following a joint agreement between the two parties. This was to allow the İYİ Party to form a parliamentary group that would be eligible to field a presidential candidate without the need to collect signatures and compete independently.

Meral Akşener was the party's 2018 presidential candidate, but didn't stand for election as an MP. İYİ participated in the Nation Alliance (Millet İtifakı) with the CHP, SP, and DP in the parliamentary election, receiving 9.96% of the vote.

=== 2019 municipal election ===
Akşener continued the alliance with Kılıçdaroğlu's CHP, dividing the country into regions where only CHP and İYİ candidates would run without interfering with each other. Ekrem İmamoğlu and Mansur Yavaş won as joint Nation Alliance candidates for the Istanbul and Ankara municipalities respectively, however İYİ failed to capture any provincial or metropolitan mayorships for themselves.

=== 2023 elections ===
In 2020, prominent İYİ member Ümit Özdağ separated from the party, forming the right wing Victory Party the next year.

On 3 March 2023, Meral Akşener announced that she took the decision to withdraw from the Nation Alliance, and said her party would not support main opposition CHP leader Kemal Kılıçdaroğlu as the joint candidate in the 2023 Turkish presidential election. However, on 6 March, Akşener and the Good Party rejoined the alliance after intense public criticism and after it was announced that Ekrem İmamoğlu and Mansur Yavaş would be appointed vice-presidents if Kılıçdaroğlu won the presidential election.

On 31 March 2023, the Istanbul headquarters of the Good Party was targeted in a shooting attack. Akşener criticized Erdoğan after the attack by saying "A political party cannot be intimidated one and a half months before an election. We are not afraid. I fear nothing but God. Mr. Recep, I am not afraid of you. But you are the president and you are responsible for every citizen in this country."

İYİ participated in the Nation Alliance with the CHP, SP, DP, DEVA, and GP in the 2023 parliamentary election, receiving 9.69% of the vote. After the election, İYİ's secretary general Uğur Poyraz declared the Nation Alliance dissolved.

=== 2024 local elections ===
For the 2024 local elections, Akşener refused an offer from the CHP for an electoral alliance. While the Good Party won the mayoralty of Nevşehir province, its national showing collapsed to less than 5% due to most of its supporters voting for the CHP, which won the popular vote. Meral Akşener declared her intention to resign from the party leadership, and was replaced by Müsavat Dervişoğlu, her preferred successor, in a party congress.

== Ideology and policies ==
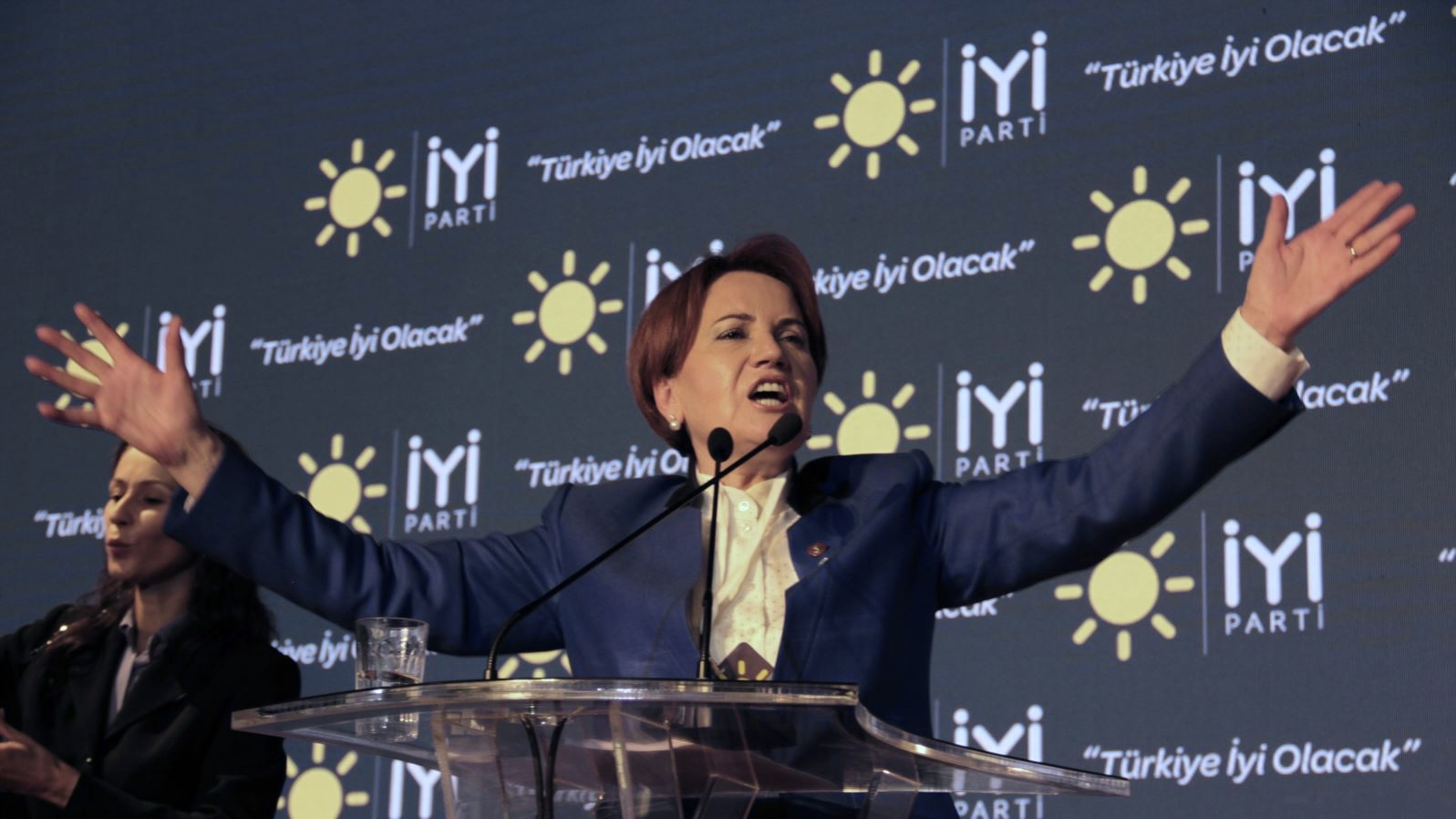
Meral Akşener giving her first speech as party leader, 25 October 2017

Meral Akşener describes İYİ Party as a nationalist, developmentalist and democratic party that is on the centre of the political spectrum. The media describes İYİ Party as a Turkish nationalist, conservative and Kemalist political party on the centre-right or right-wing. The party advocates for a new constitution and a parliamentary form of government and is opposed to Erdoğan's executive aggrandizement.

Although the party described itself as nationalist conservative during its formation period, its ideology represents civic nationalism rather than the MHP's ardent ethnic nationalism. It is strongly in favour of the ideals and principles of Turkey's founding president, Mustafa Kemal Atatürk.

=== Feminism ===
Akşener employed populist and feminist rhetoric in the early days of her party. In addition to her being the first woman candidate for Turkish presidency in history, Akşener put great emphasis on women's rights in Turkey and made this a central plank of her presidential campaign. She announced that her movement would spark a Tülbent Revolution - named after a traditional piece of clothing which rural Turkish women wear to partially cover their heads, but that is non-religious nor associated with political Islam. It would result in reconciliation of different lifestyles in Turkey, since according to Akşener, respect is more important than tolerance because tolerance usually describes a majority's behavior upon a minority which is not the case in Turkish society.

Her campaign drew attention to the drastic increase of cases of violence against women and rape in Turkey under the AKP administration. Akşener declared her pledge to lift good conduct time in all cases of violence against women and rape, and instead of forcefully sending women to therapy in such cases, her party would send the perpetrator to mandatory therapy before or after serving their sentence and therapy for women would be optional. She is heavily against child marriages. Although there was an increase in participation of women in the workforce in Turkey, Akşener stated she finds this inadequate and would implement affirmative action to increase participation of women in workforce and to reduce the wage gap.

İYİ Party does not have a women's wing. Akşener advocated that women's wings discriminate against women. Instead İYİ Party has mandatory women's quota of 25% for all branches and candidates of her party, including the general administrative board. As of 2023, İYİ party's 43 MP delegation to the Grand National Assembly contains only 5 women, which is a ratio of 11.6%.

=== Foreign policy ===
Akşener and her party has promoted pro-Europeanism, and is in favor of continuing European integration of Turkey and close relations between EU and Turkey. However she is against a "privileged partnership" and does not refrain from criticizing the certain attitudes implemented by EU in the past process in its party program, stating that "Positive EU-Turkey relations are vital for EU as vital as they are to Turkey, but de facto freeze of the full membership process and negotiations is not only because of Turkey's inability to satisfy all the membership requirements but also because of EU's policy towards Turkey being shaped through interior fears in line with rising racist sentiment across EU in the last years."

İYİ Party supports Turkey's NATO membership. They opposed Sweden's accession into NATO. Listing the party's reservations to vote "yes" for Sweden's NATO membership, the deputy chairman of the party has stated that "Turkey's request for F-16s should be approved immediately".

=== Other stances ===
The Good Party identifies the Gülen Movement as the "most serious internal threat" to national security and advocates for an effective counter-terrorism strategy against the group which have been alleged to be behind the failed coup attempt in July 2016.

The party supports the welfare state.

The party calls for a full adoption of UNESCO Declaration of Animal Rights.

The party supports freedom of speech, and was against the 2017–2020 block of Wikipedia in Turkey.

After the United States Congress voted to recognize the Armenian Genocide in 2019, party spokesperson Yavuz Ağıralioğlu said, "We will retaliate against it with our decision to name our children Enver, Cemal and Talat".

== Election results ==
=== Parliamentary elections ===
Election	Leader	Votes			Seats		Position	Map
Election	Leader	#	%	Rank	#	±	Position	Map
2018	Meral Akşener	4,990,710	9.96	5th	43 / 600	new	Opposition	
2023	Meral Akşener	5,272,482	9.69	4th	43 / 600	▼0.18 pp	Opposition	

=== Presidential elections ===
Election	Candidate	Votes	%	Outcome
2018	Meral Akşener	3,649,030	7.29%	4th

=== Local elections ===
Election	Party leader	Mayoral election votes	Percentage of votes	Municipal councillor votes	Percentage of votes	Number of municipalities	Number of councillors	Map
2019	Meral Akşener	3,351,418	7.76%	3,142,757	7.31%	24 / 1,335	1,092 / 20,745	
2024	Meral Akşener							

== Leadership ==
=== Party leaders ===
#	Leader (birth–death)	Portrait	Took office	Left office	Term of Office
1	Meral Akşener 18 July 1956 (age 70)	Meral Akşener	25 October 2017	1 May 2024	6 years, 189 days
2	Müsavat Dervişoğlu 1 February 1960 (age 66)	Müsavat Dervişoğlu	1 May 2024	Incumbent	2 years, 205 days

=== Board ===
#	Name	Mission
1	Müsavat Dervişoğlu	Chairperson
2	Uğur Poyraz	General Secretary
3	Enver Yılmaz	Deputy Chairman / Director of Political Affairs
4	Ersin Beyaz	Director of Financial Affairs (Treasurer)
5	Hasan Toktaş	Director of the Organization
6	Şükrü Kuleyin	Director of Institutional Relations
7	Hakan Şeref Olgun	Director of Juristical, Election Affairs and Parliamentary Relations
8	Ahmet Kamil Erozan	Director of International Relations
9	Kevser Ofluoğlu	Director of Women, Family and Social Services
10	Ayyüce Türkeş Taş	Director of Turkic World and Organization Abroad
11	Cenk Özatıcı	Director of National Security and Immigration Policies
12	Cumali Durmuş	Director of Local Administrations
13	Selcan Taşcı	Director of Media Promotion
14	Erhan Usta	Director of Economical Policies
15	Alparslan Yüce	Director of R&D-Education and Politics Academy
16	Alper Akdoğan	Director of NGO Relations
17	İmren Nilay Tüfekçi	Director of Social Policies
18	Kadir Ulusoy	Director of Agricultural Policies
19	Dursun Çolak	Deputy General Secretary

=== Parliamentary group leaders ===
#	Name	Mission	Mission start
1	Müsavat Dervişoğlu	Group President	1 May 2024
2	Turhan Çömez	Deputy Presidents	6 May 2024
3	Uğur Poyraz	Deputy Presidents	21 January 2026
