= Karabük (electoral district) =

Electoral district for the Grand National Assembly of Turkey

Coordinates: 41°15′N 32°30′E

- electoral district for the Grand National Assembly of Turkey
- Karabük shown within Turkey
- Province: Karabük
- Electorate: 176,018

Current electoral district
- Created: 1995
- Seats: 3 Historical: 3 (1995–2011) 2 (2011–2018)
- MPs: List: Cem Şahin AKP Durmuş Ali Keskinkılıç AKP Cevdet Akay CHP
- Turnout at last election: 87.72%
- Representation
- AK Party: 2 / 3
- CHP: 1 / 3

Karabük is an electoral district of the Grand National Assembly of Turkey created in 1995. It elects three members of parliament (deputies) to represent the province of the same name for a five-year term by the D'Hondt method, a party-list proportional representation system. Until 1995, voters were registered to Zonguldak or Çankırı electoral districts.

== Members ==
Population reviews of each electoral district are conducted before each general election, which can lead to certain districts being granted a smaller or greater number of parliamentary seats. As a small electoral district, Karabük's seat allocation has always been low. It was three when electoral district was created in 1995. During 2011-2017, MP number is reduced to two.

MPs for Karabük, 1995 onwards
| Election (Parliament) | 1 | 2 | 3 |
|---|---|---|---|
| 1995 (20th) | Şinasi Altıner; DYP | Erol Karan; DSP | Hayrettin Dilekcan; RP |
| 1999 (21st) | İlhami Yılmaz; MHP | Erol Karan; DSP | Mustafa Eren; DYP |
| 2002 (22nd) | Mehmet Ceylan; AK Party | Ali Öğüten; AK Party | Hasan Bilir; AK Party |
| 2007 (23rd) | Mehmet Ceylan; AK Party | Cumhur Ünal; AK Party | Mustafa Ünal; AK Party |
| 2011 (24th) | Osman Kahveci; AK Party | Mehmet Ali Şahin; AK Party | No seat |
| June 2015 (25th) | Osman Kahveci; AK Party | Durmuş Yalçın; MHP | No seat |
| November 2015 (26th) | Mehmet Ali Şahin; AK Party | Burhanettin Uysal; AK Party | No seat |
| 2018 (27th) | Cumhur Ünal; AK Party | Niyazi Güneş; AK Party | Hüseyin Avni Aksoy; CHP (elected); Memleket (after 2021) |
| 2023 (28th) | Cem Şahin; AK Party | Durmuş Ali Keskinkılıç; AK Party | Cevdet Akay; CHP |

== General elections ==
=== 2023 ===
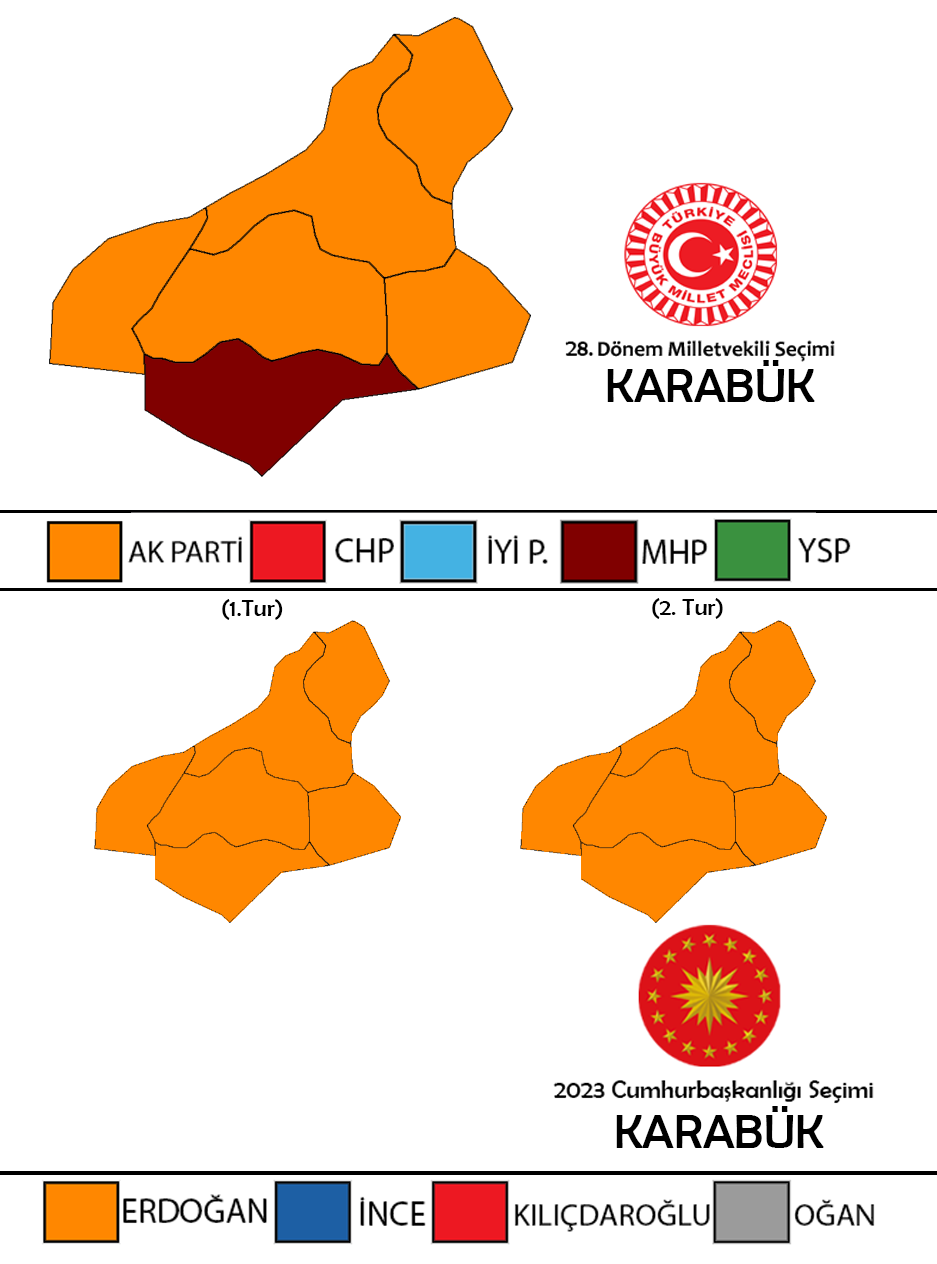
2023 election results

| Party or alliance | | Electoral votes | | Inc. votes abroad | | Seats | +/– |
| Party or alliance | | Votes | % | Votes | % | Seats | +/– |
|---|---|---|---|---|---|---|---|
| People's Alliance | Justice and Development Party | 59,200 | 37.44 | 61,623 | 37.67 | 2 | – |
| People's Alliance | Nationalist Movement Party | 25,487 | 16.12 | 26,092 | 15.95 | 0 | – |
| People's Alliance | New Welfare Party | 13,356 | 8.45 | 13,420 | 8.20 | 0 | New |
| People's Alliance | Great Unity Party | 682 | 0.43 | 707 | 0.43 | 0 | – |
| People's Alliance | Total | 101,841 | 64.40 | | | 2 | – |
| Nation Alliance | Republican People's Party | 34,632 | 21.90 | 35,917 | 21.96 | 1 | – |
| Nation Alliance | Good Party | 15,589 | 9.86 | 15,782 | 9.65 | 0 | – |
| Nation Alliance | Total | 51,698 | 32.69 | | | 1 | – |
| Labour and Freedom Alliance | Party of Greens and the Left Future | 635 | 0.40 | 1,175 | 0.72 | 0 | – |
| Labour and Freedom Alliance | Workers' Party of Turkey | 519 | 0.33 | 676 | 0.41 | 0 | – |
| Labour and Freedom Alliance | Total | 1,154 | 0.73 | | | 0 | – |
| Ancestral Alliance | Victory Party | 3,339 | 2.11 | 3,392 | 2.07 | 0 | New |
| Ancestral Alliance | Justice Party | 732 | 0.46 | 742 | 0.45 | 0 | 0 |
| Ancestral Alliance | Total | 4,071 | 2.57 | | | 0 | New |
| Homeland Party | | 1,646 | 1.04 | 1,690 | 1.03 | 0 | New |
| Union of Socialist Forces | Left Party | 135 | 0.09 | 143 | 0.09 | 0 | 0 |
| Union of Socialist Forces | Communist Party of Turkey | 110 | 0.07 | 115 | 0.07 | 0 | 0 |
| Union of Socialist Forces | Communist Movement of Turkey | 49 | 0.03 | 51 | 0.03 | 0 | 0 |
| Union of Socialist Forces | Total | 254 | 0.16 | | | 0 | New |
| Young Party | | 330 | 0.21 | 336 | 0.21 | 0 | 0 |
| Motherland Party | | 384 | 0.24 | 389 | 0.24 | 0 | 0 |
| Patriotic Party | | 127 | 0.08 | 131 | 0.08 | 0 | 0 |
| Nation Party | | 153 | 0.10 | 157 | 0.10 | 0 | 0 |
| Rights and Freedoms Party | | 207 | 0.13 | 211 | 0.13 | 0 | 0 |
| Justice Unity Party | | 356 | 0.23 | 363 | 0.22 | 0 | New |
| People's Liberation Party | | 115 | 0.07 | 117 | 0.07 | 0 | 0 |
| Power Union Party | | 106 | 0.07 | 109 | 0.07 | 0 | New |
| National Road Party | | 180 | 0.11 | 181 | 0.11 | 0 | New |
| Innovation Party | | 58 | 0.04 | 58 | 0.04 | 0 | New |
| Independents | | 0 | 0.00 | 0 | 0.00 | 0 | 0 |
| Total | | 158,127 | 100.00 | 163,577 | 100.00 | 3 | 0 |
| Valid votes | | 158,127 | 96.93 | 163,577 | 100.00 | | |
| Invalid/blank votes | | 5,008 | 3.07 | 0 | 0.00 | | |
| Total votes | | 163,135 | 100.00 | 163,577 | 100.00 | | |
| Registered voters/turnout | | 182,049 | 89.61 | | | | |
Source: Anadolu Agency

=== 2018 ===
2018 parliamentary election: Karabük
| Alliance | Party | MPs | Votes | Votes abroad | Total votes | % | ± |
|---|---|---|---|---|---|---|---|
| People's Alliance; Cumhur İttifakı | AK Party | 2 | 80,848 | 2,404 | 83,252 | 53.81% | ▼6.6% |
| People's Alliance; Cumhur İttifakı | MHP | 0 | 20,635 | 372 | 21,007 | 13.58% | ▼5.54% |
| People's Alliance; Cumhur İttifakı | Total | 2 | 101,483 | 2,776 | 104,259 | 67.39% | new |
| Nation Alliance; Millet İttifakı | CHP | 1 | 24,947 | 825 | 25,772 | 16.66% | ▲1.38% |
| Nation Alliance; Millet İttifakı | İYİ | 0 | 18,641 | 188 | 18,829 | 12.17% | new |
| Nation Alliance; Millet İttifakı | Felicity | 0 | 2,625 | 35 | 2,660 | 1.72% | ▲0.48% |
| Nation Alliance; Millet İttifakı | Total | 1 | 46,213 | 1,048 | 47,261 | 30.55% | new |
| No Alliance | HDP | 0 | 1,486 | 804 | 2,290 | 1.48% | ▲0.36% |
| No Alliance | Vatan | 0 | 552 | 12 | 564 | 0.36% | ▲0.14% |
| No Alliance | Hüda-par | 0 | 323 | 6 | 329 | 0.21% | new |
| Total votes | | | 176,018 | - | - | 100% | - |
| Turnout | | | 150,057 | 4,646 | - | 87.72% | ▲0.61% |

=== November 2015 ===
November 2015 general election: Karabük
| Party | MPs | Votes | Votes abroad | Total votes | % | ± |
|---|---|---|---|---|---|---|
| AK Party | 2 | 86,994 | 2,231 | 89,225 | 60.41% | ▲12.46% |
| MHP | 0 | 28,396 | 283 | 28,679 | 19.42% | ▼7.76% |
| CHP | 0 | 21,911 | 651 | 22,562 | 15.28% | ▼1.95% |
| Felicity | 0 | 1,802 | 20 | 1,822 | 1.23% | ▼2.06% |
| HDP | 0 | 931 | 722 | 1,653 | 1.12% | ▼0.43% |
| Other parties | 0 | 3,688 | 59 | 3,747 | 2.54% | ▼0.26% |
| Total votes | | 168,503 | - | - | 100% | - |
| Turnout | | 146,784 | 3,966 | - | 87.11% | ▲0.73% |

=== June 2015 ===
June 2015 general election: Karabük
| Party | MPs | Votes | Votes abroad | Total votes | % | ± |
|---|---|---|---|---|---|---|
| AK Party | 1 | 67,540 | 1,624 | 69,164 | 47.95% | ▼9.98 |
| MHP | 1 | 38,902 | 301 | 39,203 | 27.18% | ▲11.61 |
| CHP | 0 | 24,292 | 561 | 24,853 | 17.23% | ▼1.8 |
| Felicity | 0 | 4,698 | 51 | 4,749 | 3.29% | ▲0.91 |
| HDP | 0 | 1,578 | 660 | 2,238 | 1.55% | new |
| Other parties | 0 | 3,976 | 58 | 4,034 | 2.8% | |
| Total votes | | 167,884 | - | - | 100% | - |
| Turnout | | 145,025 | 3,255 | - | 86.38% | ▼1.95 |

=== 2011 ===
2011 general election: Karabük
| Party | Candidate | Votes | % | ±% |
|---|---|---|---|---|
| AK Party | 2 elected ▼1: 1. Mehmet Ali Şahin ✓; 2. Osman Kahveci ✓ | 82,141 | 57.93 | ▲3.23 |
| CHP | None elected: 1. Mustafa Eren ✗; 2. Erdoğan Dincel ✗ | 26,981 | 19.03 | ▲5.42 |
| MHP | None elected: 1. Bircan Akyıldız ✗; 2. Nizamettin Arslan ✗ | 22,074 | 15.57 | ▲2.14 |
| SAADET | None elected: 1. Aziz Gündoğdu ✗; 2. Fatma Güney ✗ | 3,381 | 2.38 | ▼1.73 |
| HAS Party | None elected: 1. Hayrettin Dilekcan ✗; 2. Cemalettin Yavaşcı ✗ | 2,408 | 1.70 | ▲1.70 |
| DP | None elected: 1. Fikret Çatmakaş ✗; 2. Recep Özcan ✗ | 1,815 | 1.28 | ▼4.98 |
| Büyük Birlik | None elected: 1. Hüdayet Malakcı ✗; 2. Şenol Diktepe ✗ | 833 | 0.59 | ▲0.59 |
| DSP | None elected: 1. Deniz Güryol ✗; 2. Sercan Günarslan ✗ | 457 | 0.32 | N/A |
| DYP | None elected: 1. İmran Aksoy ✗; 2. Mehmet Bayar ✗ | 428 | 0.30 | ▲0.30 |
| HEPAR | None elected: 1. Fahri Gürkan Söyler ✗; 2. Selma Gebel ✗ | 342 | 0.24 | ▲0.24 |
| Labour | None elected: 1. Devrim Avcı Özkurt ✗; 2. Gülü Budak ✗ | 304 | 0.21 | ▼0.17 |
| TKP | None elected: 1. Şerif Özgür Urfa ✗; 2. Adnan Yeşilcam ✗ | 194 | 0.14 | ▼0.14 |
| Nationalist Conservative | None elected: 1. Süat Abay ✗; 2. Banu Arslan ✗ | 149 | 0.11 | ▲0.11 |
| MP | None elected: 1. Mehmet Özkaya ✗; 2. Nuh Altılı ✗ | 139 | 0.10 | ▲0.10 |
| Liberal Democrat | None elected: 1. Harun Demir ✗; 2. Ahmet Memik ✗ | 136 | 0.10 | ▼0.26 |
| Total votes | | 141,782 | 100.00 | |
| Rejected ballots | | 3,720 | 2.56 | ▲0.90 |
| Turnout | | 145,047 | 88.33 | ▲1.76 |
| AK Party hold Majority | | 55,160 | 38.90 | ▼2.19 |

=== 2007 ===
2007 general election: Karabük
| Party | MPs | Votes | Votes abroad | Total votes | % | ± |
|---|---|---|---|---|---|---|
| AK Party | 3 | 69,922 | 556 | 70,478 | 54.69% | ▲9.50% |
| CHP | 0 | 17,428 | 96 | 17,524 | 13.60% | ▲2.81% |
| MHP | 0 | 17,167 | 116 | 17,283 | 13.41% | ▲6.95% |
| DP | 0 | 8,049 | 26 | 8,075 | 6.27% | new |
| SP | 0 | 5,261 | 44 | 5,305 | 4.12% | ▲0.04% |
| GP | 0 | 2,357 | 12 | 2,369 | 1.84% | ▼2.88% |
| BTP | 0 | 2,173 | 10 | 2,183 | 1.69% | ▲0.19% |
| ATP | 0 | 1,828 | 25 | 1,853 | 1.44% | new |
| HYP | 0 | 1,212 | 5 | 1,217 | 0.94% | new |
| İP | 0 | 606 | 5 | 611 | 0.47% | ▼0.03% |
| EMEP | 0 | 484 | 10 | 494 | 0.38% | new |
| LDP | 0 | 451 | 2 | 453 | 0.35% | ▼0.09% |
| TKP | 0 | 354 | 2 | 356 | 0.28% | ▲0.09% |
| ÖDP | 0 | 300 | 6 | 306 | 0.24% | ▼0.06% |
| Independents | 0 | 358 | 0 | 358 | 0.28% | - |
| Total votes | | 151,375 | - | - | 100% | - |
| Turnout | | 127,950 | 915 | - | 86.57% | ▲3.89% |

=== 2002 ===
2002 general election: Karabük
| Party | MPs | Votes | Votes abroad | Total votes | % | ± |
|---|---|---|---|---|---|---|
| AK Party | 3 | 56,828 | 198 | 57,026 | 45.19% | new |
| DYP | 0 | 17,775 | 30 | 17,805 | 14.11% | ▼3.03% |
| CHP | 0 | 13,559 | 58 | 13,617 | 10.79% | 4.34% |
| MHP | 0 | 8,115 | 35 | 8,150 | 6.46% | ▼15.66% |
| ANAP | 0 | 7,786 | 48 | 7,834 | 6.21% | ▼8.04% |
| GP | 0 | 5,942 | 17 | 5,959 | 4.72% | new |
| SP | 0 | 5,115 | 28 | 5,143 | 4.08% | new |
| BTP | 0 | 1,896 | 5 | 1,901 | 1.51% | new |
| DEHAP | 0 | 1,812 | 5 | 1,817 | 1.44% | new |
| DSP | 0 | 1,753 | 9 | 1,762 | 1.40% | ▼18.06% |
| BBP | 0 | 1,348 | 4 | 1,352 | 1.07% | ▼0.49% |
| YTP | 0 | 859 | 6 | 865 | 0.69% | new |
| YP | 0 | 761 | 2 | 763 | 0.60% | new |
| İP | 0 | 629 | 2 | 631 | 0.50% | ▲0.22% |
| LDP | 0 | 553 | 2 | 555 | 0.44% | ▼0.32% |
| Millet | 0 | 402 | 1 | 403 | 0.32% | ▼0.03% |
| ÖDP | 0 | 368 | 2 | 370 | 0.29% | ▼0.19% |
| TKP | 0 | 236 | 1 | 237 | 0.19% | ▼0.02%* |
| Total votes | | 156,811 | - | - | 100% | - |
| Turnout | | 125,737 | 453 | - | 82.69% | ▼3.74% |

- Contested as SİP in previous election.

=== 1999 ===
1999 general election: Karabük
| Party | MPs | Votes | % | ± |
|---|---|---|---|---|
| MHP | 1 | 28,142 | 22.12% | ▲12.13% |
| DSP | 1 | 24,762 | 19.46% | ▲1.53% |
| DYP | 1 | 21,808 | 17.14% | ▼7.78% |
| ANAP | 0 | 18,135 | 14.25% | ▼1.89% |
| FP | 0 | 17,660 | 13.88% | new |
| CHP | 0 | 8,212 | 6.45% | ▼0.18% |
| BBP | 0 | 1,981 | 1.56% | new |
| HADEP | 0 | 1,505 | 1.18% | ▲0.42% |
| LDP | 0 | 961 | 0.76% | new |
| DTP | 0 | 907 | 0.71% | new |
| ÖDP | 0 | 618 | 0.49% | new |
| DP | 0 | 578 | 0.45% | new |
| Millet | 0 | 448 | 0.35% | ▼0.16% |
| İP | 0 | 362 | 0.28% | ▲0.03% |
| DEPAR | 0 | 314 | 0.25% | new |
| YDP | 0 | 289 | 0.23% | ▼0.20% |
| EMEP | 0 | 288 | 0.23% | new |
| SİP | 0 | 268 | 0.21% | new |
| Total votes | | 127,238 | 100% | - |
| Turnout | | 147,208 | 86.43% | ▲0.44% |

=== 1995 ===
1995 general election: Karabük
| Party | MPs | Votes | % |
|---|---|---|---|
| DYP | 1 | 31,686 | 24.92% |
| RP | 1 | 27,834 | 21.89% |
| DSP | 1 | 22,802 | 17.93% |
| ANAP | 0 | 20,525 | 16.14% |
| MHP | 0 | 12,702 | 9.99% |
| CHP | 0 | 8,431 | 6.63% |
| HADEP | 0 | 970 | 0.76% |
| Millet | 0 | 652 | 0.51% |
| YDP | 0 | 548 | 0.43% |
| YDH | 0 | 531 | 0.42% |
| İP | 0 | 318 | 0.25% |
| Yeni | 0 | 168 | 0.13% |
| Total votes | | 126,777 | 100% |
| Turnout | | 151,610 | 85.99% |

== Presidential elections ==
=== 2023 ===
| Candidate | Party | First round | | Second round | |
| Candidate | Party | Votes | % | Votes | % |
|---|---|---|---|---|---|
| Recep Tayyip Erdoğan | Justice and Development Party | 94,396 | 59.40 | 98,521 | 63.72 |
| Kemal Kılıçdaroğlu | Republican People's Party | 50,937 | 32.05 | 56,084 | 36.28 |
| Sinan Oğan | Independent (Ancestral Alliance) | 12,564 | 7.91 | | |
| Muharrem İnce (Note: Withdrew, remained on ballot) | Homeland Party | 1,030 | 0.65 | | |
| Total | | 158,927 | 100.00 | 154,605 | 100.00 |
| Valid votes | | 158,927 | 97.44 | 154,605 | 98.17 |
| Invalid/blank votes | | 4,179 | 2.56 | 2,886 | 1.83 |
| Total votes | | 163,106 | 100.00 | 157,491 | 100.00 |
| Registered voters/turnout | | 182,049 | 89.59 | 182,181 | 86.45 |
Source: YSK

=== 2018 ===
2018 presidential election: Karabük
| Party | Candidate | Votes | % |
|---|---|---|---|
| AK Party | Recep Tayyip Erdoğan | 97,688 | 65.44% |
| CHP | Muharrem İnce | 34,662 | 23.22% |
| İYİ | Meral Akşener | 13,836 | 9.27% |
| SAADET | Temel Karamollaoğlu | 1,967 | 1.32% |
| HDP | Selahattin Demirtaş | 688 | 0.46% |
| Patriotic | Doğu Perinçek | 432 | 0.29% |
| Total votes | | 149,273 | 100.00 |

=== 2014 ===
2014 presidential election: Karabük
| Party | Candidate | Votes | % |
|---|---|---|---|
| AK Party | Recep Tayyip Erdoğan | 81,621 | 64.57 |
| Independent | Ekmeleddin İhsanoğlu | 43,018 | 34.03 |
| HDP | Selahattin Demirtaş | 1,760 | 1.39 |
| Total votes | | 126,399 | 100.00 |
| Rejected ballots | | 3,561 | 2.74 |
| Turnout | | 129,960 | 78.21 |
| Recep Tayyip Erdoğan win | | | |

== Referendums ==
| Referendum | Yes | | No | | Total electorate | Turnout | % | National result |
| Referendum | Votes | % | Votes | % | Total electorate | Turnout | % | National result |
|---|---|---|---|---|---|---|---|---|
| 2007 | 82,200 | 75.35% | 26,889 | 24.65% | 151,645 | 112,814 | 74.39% | Approved with 68.95% |
| 2010 | 84,821 | 63.76% | 48,203 | 36.24% | 163,081 | 136,555 | 83.73% | Approved with 57.88% |
| 2017 | 89,031 | 60.73% | 57,581 | 39.27% | 172,642 | 150,060 | 86.92% | Approved with 51.41% |
