= March 1st Authorization =

Rejected 2003 Turkish government motion

The March 1st Authorization, officially titled "Authorization for the Government to Send the Turkish Armed Forces to Foreign Countries and to Allow Foreign Armed Forces to be Present in Turkey," is a parliamentary motion presented to the Turkish Grand National Assembly (TBMM) by the government on February 25, 2003, regarding the Iraq crisis, and was rejected in the general assembly.

== Content ==
The motion sought a 6-month authorization from the TBMM for the government, which is responsible to the Grand National Assembly for ensuring national security and preparing the Armed Forces for homeland defense under Article 117 of the Constitution, to: - Send the Turkish Armed Forces to Northern Iraq; - Use these forces in Northern Iraq as necessary to maintain effective deterrence under principles to be determined, and to make arrangements for the use of foreign military aircraft in Turkish airspace and to set the rules for such usage under Article 92 of the Constitution.

The motion proposed that a maximum of 62,000 foreign military personnel could stay in Turkey for 6 months, and that the foreign forces' air assets would be limited to 255 aircraft and 65 helicopters.

== Voting in the TBMM ==
In a speech, Önder Sav from the CHP opposed the motion, referring to American ships as "enemy ships". Ahmet Sever, in a work where he wrote as an advisor to Abdullah Gül, described the situation within the AK Party: "Notable figures like Beşir Atalay, Mehmet Aydın, Ertuğrul Yalçınbayır, Bülent Arınç, Zeki Ergezen, Azmi Ateş, and Kemalettin Göktaş were against the motion and were actively working against it within the party. Recep Tayyip Erdoğan, on the other hand, emphasized that the motion had to be passed in the parliament." "Cüneyt Zapsu, Ömer Çelik, and Egemen Bağış were working hard for the acceptance of the motion. Zapsu, in particular, was in constant contact with the US Deputy Secretary of Defense Paul Wolfowitz." In the voting, 533 members of parliament participated, with 250 votes against, 264 votes in favor, and 19 abstentions. However, the motion did not reach the required 267 majority according to Article 96 of the Constitution. Therefore, the motion was considered rejected.

== Rejection and Effects ==
The rejection of the motion caused disappointment among Americans. Unable to use Turkish airspace, ports, and territories, the United States faced a significant failure during the Iraq invasion, resulting in heavy economic and social costs.

However, it would be incorrect to attribute all of the US's military difficulties solely to the March 1st Authorization. The United States Armed Forces executed the Iraq invasion through different military bases in various countries by air and amphibious operations from the south of the country. Air-strike and close-support operations were carried out entirely from aircraft carriers and air bases in Saudi Arabia; long-range strategic bombing operations were conducted from RAF Lakenheath in the UK and the Diego Garcia base in the Indian Ocean. İncirlik was important not as a launch point for US fighter aircraft, as was the case in the First Gulf War, but as a logistical and transit point.

President Bush and his team faced significant criticism from the American public and encountered unexpected levels of civilian resistance in Iraq.

It is claimed that the Baghdad Mall Incident that occurred after the rejection of the motion was a form of retaliation for the parliamentary decision.

President Recep Tayyip Erdoğan stated in a 2016 statement, "We do not want to make the same mistake in Syria as we did in Iraq. I supported the March 1st Authorization; those who opposed it did not express it openly. Some engaged in secret lobbying. You can investigate and find out who those people were. If the March 1st Authorization had been accepted at the beginning, Turkey would have been at the table regarding Iraq. If it had passed at the beginning, Turkey would have been at the table."

== See also ==
- Protests against the Iraq War
