= 58th cabinet of Turkey =

Government of the Republic of Turkey (2002-2003)

Abdullah Gül cabinet Gül Hükümeti
- 58th Cabinet of Turkey
- 19 November 2002 – 12 March 2003
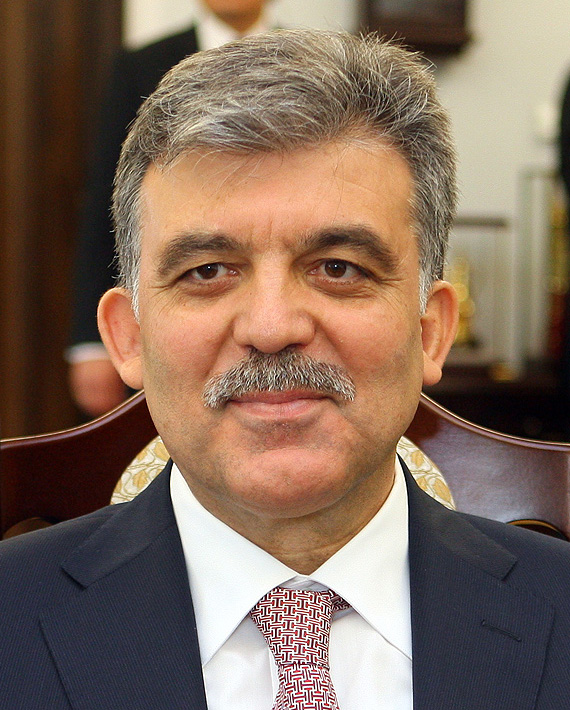
- Date formed: 19 November 2002
- Date dissolved: 12 March 2003

People and organisations
- Head of state: Ahmet Necdet Sezer
- Head of government: Abdullah Gül
- No. of ministers: 25
- Member party: Justice and Development Party
- Status in legislature: Single-party majority
- Opposition party: Republican People's Party
- Opposition leader: Deniz Baykal

History
- Election: 3 November 2002
- Legislature term: 22nd
- Predecessor: Ecevit V
- Successor: Erdoğan I

The cabinet of Abdullah Gül took office on 19 November 2002. He succeeded to the fifth government of Bülent Ecevit.

After the Justice and Development Party (AKP) became the biggest party in the general elections of 2002, its leader Recep Tayyip Erdoğan could not be prime minister because of a previous conviction and bar from politics. So the second person in the party, Abdullah Gül, formed the 58th government of Turkey. After the legal and political problems for Erdoğan had been eliminated, Abdullah Gül stepped aside and became the Minister of Foreign Affairs of the next government while Erdoğan became prime minister.

Functions		Holder	Start	End
English title	Turkish title	Holder	Start	End
Prime Minister	Başbakan	Abdullah Gül	19 November 2002	12 March 2003
Deputy Prime Minister	Başbakan Yardımcısı	Abdüllatif Şener	19 November 2002	12 March 2003
Deputy Prime Minister	Başbakan Yardımcısı	Mehmet Ali Şahin	19 November 2002	12 March 2003
Deputy Prime Minister	Başbakan Yardımcısı	Ertuğrul Yalçınbayır	19 November 2002	12 March 2003
Minister of State	Devlet Bakanı	Mehmet Aydın	19 November 2002	12 March 2003
Minister of State	Devlet Bakanı	Beşir Atalay	19 November 2002	12 March 2003
Minister of State	Devlet Bakanı	Ali Babacan	19 November 2002	12 March 2003
Minister of State	Devlet Bakanı	Kürşad Tüzmen	19 November 2002	12 March 2003
Minister of Justice	Adalet Bakanı	Cemil Çiçek	19 November 2002	12 March 2003
Minister of National Defense	Millî Savunma Bakanı	Mehmet Vecdi Gönül	19 November 2002	12 March 2003
Minister of the Interior	İçişleri Bakanı	Abdülkadir Aksu	19 November 2002	12 March 2003
Minister of Foreign Affairs	Dışişleri Bakanlığı	Yaşar Yakış	19 November 2002	12 March 2003
Minister of Finance	Maliye Bakanı	Kemal Unakıtan	19 November 2002	12 March 2003
Minister of National Education	Millî Eğitim Bakanı	Erkan Mumcu	19 November 2002	12 March 2003
Minister of Public Works and Settlement	Bayındırlık ve İskân Bakanı	Zeki Ergezen	19 November 2002	12 March 2003
Minister of Health	Sağlık Bakanı	Recep Akdağ	19 November 2002	12 March 2003
Minister of Transport and Communication	Ulaştırma Bakanı	Binali Yıldırım	19 November 2002	12 March 2003
Minister of Agriculture	Tarım ve Köyişleri Bakanı	Sami Güçlü	19 November 2002	12 March 2003
Minister of Labour and Social Security	Çalışma ve Sosyal Güvenlik Bakanı	Murat Başesgioğlu	19 November 2002	12 March 2003
Minister of Industry and Commerce	Sanayi ve Ticaret Bakanı	Ali Coşkun	19 November 2002	12 March 2003
Minister of Energy and Natural Resources	Enerji ve Tabii Kaynaklar Bakanı	Mehmet Hilmi Güler	19 November 2002	12 March 2003
Minister of Culture	Kültür Bakanı	Hüseyin Çelik	19 November 2002	12 March 2003
Minister of Tourism	Turizm Bakanı	Güldal Akşit	19 November 2002	12 March 2003
Minister of Forestry	Orman Bakanı	Osman Pepe	19 November 2002	12 March 2003
Minister of Environment	Çevre Bakanı	İmdat Sütlüoğlu	19 November 2002	12 March 2003

== See also ==
- Cabinet of Turkey
