= Köksal Toptan =

23rd Speaker of the Parliament of Turkey

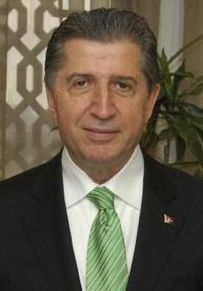
- Toptan in 2013

23rd Speaker of the Grand National Assembly
- In office 9 August 2007 – 9 August 2009
- President: Ahmet Necdet Sezer; Abdullah Gül
- Deputy: Eyyüp Cenap Gülpınar; Nevzat Pakdil; Meral Akşener; Güldal Mumcu
- Preceded by: Bülent Arınç
- Succeeded by: Mehmet Ali Şahin

Minister of Culture
- In office 5 October 1995 – 30 October 1995
- Prime Minister: Tansu Çiller
- Preceded by: İsmail Cem
- Succeeded by: Fikri Sağlar

Minister of National Education
- In office 23 June 1991 – 25 June 1993
- Prime Minister: Süleyman Demirel
- Preceded by: Avni Akyol
- Succeeded by: Nahit Menteşe

Minister of State
- In office 12 November 1979 – 12 September 1980
- Prime Minister: Süleyman Demirel

Member of the Grand National Assembly
- In office 3 November 2002 – 7 June 2015
- Constituency: Zonguldak (2002, 2007, 2011)
- In office 14 December 1987 – 18 April 1999
- Constituency: Zonguldak (1987); Bartın (1991, 1995)
- In office 5 June 1977 – 12 September 1980
- Constituency: Zonguldak (1977)

Personal details
- Born: 3 January 1943 (age 83) Rize, Turkey
- Party: Justice Party (1963-1980); True Path Party (1986-1999); Justice and Development Party (2002-present)
- Spouse: Saime Toptan
- Education: Istanbul University

Köksal Toptan (born 3 January 1943) is a Turkish lawyer, politician and a member of the Justice and Development Party. He earlier served as government minister in three cabinets. He was the speaker of the Grand National Assembly of Turkey between August 2007 and August 2009.

He was educated in the Faculty of Law at Istanbul University. He worked as a lawyer following his graduation. Köksal Toptan entered politics first at regional level in Zonguldak. Later, he was elected to the parliament as Deputy of Zonguldak and Bartın. He served as Minister of State in the 6th Süleyman Demirel cabinet (12 November 1979 – 12 September 1980), as Minister of National Education in the 7th Demirel cabinet (23 June 1991 – 25 June 1993) and then as Minister of Culture in the 2nd Tansu Çiller cabinet (5 October 1995 – 30 October 1995). During the government of Justice and Development Party (AKP), he was the chairman of the parliament commission of justice between 2003 and 2007.

Elected as deputy of Zonguldak from the AKP again in 2007, he was nominated by his party for the post of Speaker of the Parliament on 8 August 2007. On 9 August 2007, Köksal Toptan was elected 23rd Speaker of the parliament, supported also by the opposition parties.

Köksal Toptan is married with three children.

== Extended biography ==
On 12 November 1979, he was appointed as a state minister in the Süleyman Demirel government, a post he held until the military coup of 12 September 1980. Banned from politics, Toptan started to work as a lawyer and even represented Demirel, who was also banned from political activity. He became famous winning all the cases in which he defended Demirel. In 1983, he took an active role in the establishment of the True Path Party (DYP), then led by Hüsamettin Cindoruk, and entered Parliament for a second time as a Zonguldak deputy in the interim elections held on 28 September 1986. In the 1991 elections, he became a deputy from Bartın and then was appointed minister of education. During his term, he introduced innovative projects such as open high schools and student transfers from the Turkic republics.

After Demirel was elected president in 1993, he competed with Tansu Çiller for leadership of the DYP but was defeated and resigned from his post as education minister. In 1995, he served as culture minister and was re-elected as a Bartın deputy in the general elections held in December of that year. In the 1999 general elections, Toptan was unable to enter Parliament but began to work as the chairman of a foundation promoting Turkey.

Before the 2002 elections, he was invited by Erdoğan to the AKP, was elected as a deputy from Zonguldak and was appointed chairman of the parliamentary Justice Commission, where he helped draft the new Turkish Penal Code (TCK). Before Gül was first nominated for the presidency, his name was frequently mentioned as a possible candidate for that post. He was hospitalized at the hour when Gül's candidacy was announced and it was rumored backstage that Toptan's illness could be attributed to his disappointment about not being nominated.

Toptan's wife is a former judge with the Supreme Court of Appeals. During his term as education minister, Toptan conducted appreciable work related to disabilities and encouraged the opening of numerous rehabilitation centers. Toptan's wife, Saime Toptan, is the chairwoman of the Turkish Training and Solidarity Foundation for the Disabled.

Political offices
Preceded by Bülent Arınç	Speaker of the Parliament of Turkey; 9 August 2007 – 9 August 2009	Succeeded by Mehmet Ali Şahin
