= Mehmet Ali Şahin =

24th Speaker of the Parliament of Turkey

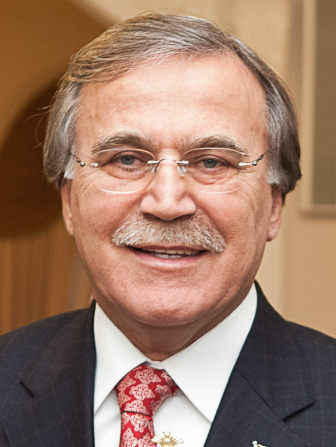
- Şahin in 2011

24th Speaker of the Grand National Assembly of Turkey
- In office 9 August 2009 – 28 June 2011
- President: Abdullah Gül
- Deputy: Nevzat Pakdil; Sadık Yakut; Güldal Mumcu; Meral Akşener
- Preceded by: Köksal Toptan
- Succeeded by: Cemil Çiçek

Minister of Justice
- In office 29 August 2007 – 1 May 2009
- Prime Minister: Recep Tayyip Erdoğan
- Preceded by: Fahri Kasırga
- Succeeded by: Sadullah Ergin

Deputy Prime Minister of Turkey
- In office 18 November 2002 – 28 March 2003
- Prime Minister: Abdullah Gül
- Served with: Ertuğrul Yalçınbayır; Abdüllatif Şener
- Preceded by: Cumhur Ersümer
- Succeeded by: Abdullah Gül

Member of the Grand National Assembly
- In office 1 November 2015 – 24 June 2018
- Constituency: Karabük (Nov 2015)
- In office 8 January 1996 – 7 June 2015
- Constituency: İstanbul (1995, 1999, 2002); Antalya (2007); Karabük (2011)

Personal details
- Born: 16 September 1950 (age 76) Ovacık, Turkey
- Party: Welfare Party (1987-1998); Virtue Party (1998-2001); Justice and Development Party (2001-present)
- Education: Istanbul University

Mehmet Ali Şahin (born 16 September 1950) is a Turkish politician. He was the Speaker of the Parliament of Turkey from 2009 to 2011.

He was a member of the parliament for three terms from Istanbul Province and from Antalya Province of the ruling Justice and Development Party (AK Party). He served as Deputy Prime Minister, Minister of Justice, and as Minister of State responsible for sports.

Şahin is a lawyer and a graduate of Istanbul University faculty of law. Before entering parliament, he was involved in regional politics, serving as the mayor of Fatih district in Istanbul, with the Welfare Party, and later with Recep Tayyip Erdoğan's Justice and Development Party.

On 5 August 2009, he was elected in a third round of voting as the 24th (27th, from the establishment) Speaker of the Turkish Grand National Assembly, succeeding his party colleague Köksal Toptan. He was supportive of a solution to the Kurdish Turkish conflict, and dismissed the concerns of Turkish nationalists which argue that if Kurds receive more rights it would divide the country. In 2016, he also suggested the release of the imprisoned members of Parliament from the Peoples' Democracy Party (HDP) comparing their situation to the one of Mehmet Haberal, a lawmaker of the Republican People's Party (CHP) who was elected while imprisoned.

Political offices
Preceded by Cumhur Ersümer	First Deputy Prime Minister of Turkey; 2002–2003	Succeeded by Abdullah Gül
Preceded by Fahri Kasırga	Minister of Justice; 2007–2009	Succeeded by Sadullah Ergin
Preceded by Köksal Toptan	Speaker of the Parliament; 2009–2011	Succeeded by Cemil Çiçek
