= Meral Akşener =

Turkish politician (born 1956)

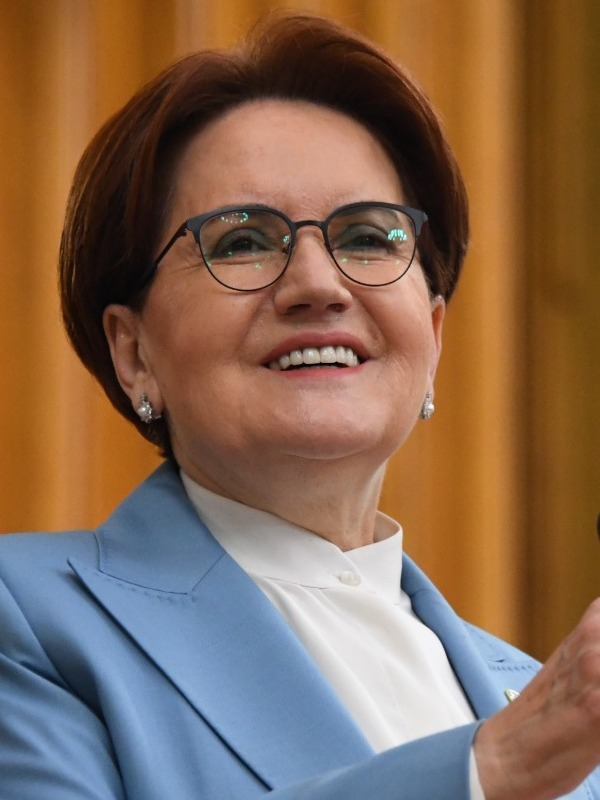
- Meral Akşener in 2021

Leader of the İYİ Party
- In office 25 October 2017 – 1 May 2024
- Preceded by: Party established
- Succeeded by: Müsavat Dervişoğlu

Deputy Speaker of the Grand National Assembly
- In office 10 August 2007 – 23 April 2015
- Speaker: Köksal Toptan; Mehmet Ali Şahin; Cemil Çiçek
- Served with: Sadık Yakut; Mehmet Sağlam; Güldal Mumcu; Ayşe Nur Bahçekapılı; Nevzat Pakdil; Eyyüp Cenap Gülpınar
- Preceded by: Yılmaz Ateş
- Succeeded by: Koray Aydın

Minister of the Interior
- In office 8 November 1996 – 30 June 1997
- Prime Minister: Necmettin Erbakan
- Preceded by: Mehmet Ağar
- Succeeded by: Murat Başesgioğlu

Member of the Grand National Assembly
- In office 23 July 2007 – 1 October 2015
- Constituency: İstanbul (III) (2007, 2011, Jun 2015)
- In office 8 January 1996 – 1 October 2002
- Constituency: İstanbul (1995); Kocaeli (1999)

Personal details
- Born: Meral Gürer; 18 July 1956 (age 70) İzmit, Turkey
- Party: Good Party (2017–present)
- Other political affiliations: True Path Party (DYP) (1995–2001); Nationalist Movement Party (MHP) (2001–2016)
- Spouse: Tuncer Akşener (m. 1980)
- Relations: Hasan Tahsin Argun (grand uncle); Işıl Akşener (daughter-in-law)
- Children: Fatih Akşener
- Education: Istanbul University; Marmara University
- Occupation: Politician, academic, historian
- Website: meralaksener.com.tr
- Nickname: Meral Mommy

Meral Akşener (née Gürer, Turkish pronunciation: [meˈɾal ˈakʃenæɾ]; born 18 July 1956) is a Turkish politician, teacher, historian and academic who is the founder of the Good Party (İYİ Party).

Akşener first entered parliament as a deputy of the True Path Party (DYP) in the 1995 and 1999 general election, and served as the interior minister in the coalition government established by Necmettin Erbakan between 1996 and 1997. Distrustful of her coalition partner, she played a key role in the downfall of her own government in the 1997 military memorandum.

Akşener entered the parliament as a deputy of the Nationalist Movement Party (MHP) in the 2007, 2011 and June 2015 general elections, serving as a vice-speaker of the Grand National Assembly from 2007 to 2015. After tensions between her and the MHP's leader Devlet Bahçeli, she was not nominated as an MP for the November 2015 general election. In 2016, she led a group of opposition within the party against Bahçeli. In 2017 she separated from the MHP and founded the Good Party, of which she was the leader. She was the party's presidential candidate for the 2018 elections. Akşener was a key opposition figure in Turkish politics and has been dubbed as an "iron lady" by international observers. She resigned her leadership following her party's defeat in the 2024 local elections, with Müsavat Dervişoğlu succeeding her.

== Early life ==
Meral Akşener was born on 18 July 1956, in the Gündoğdu neighbourhood of İzmit, Kocaeli. Her father Tahir Ömer and her mother Sıddıka are Balkan Turks from Macedonia and Thrace and were among hundreds of thousands who left Greece to resettle in Turkey in 1923. Her paternal side had migrated to the Balkans from Büyükkadı, one of the few Alevi Turkmen villages of Diyarbakır.

She studied history at Istanbul University and completed her post-graduate studies at the Social Sciences Institute of Marmara University, earning a Ph.D. in history. She then worked as a lecturer at Yıldız Technical University, Kocaeli University and Marmara University before entering politics.

== DYP and interior ministry ==
Meral's older brother was president of MHP's İzmit branch, which gave her connections to right-wing politicians. Akşener quit her post as a university department chair and entered politics with the 1994 municipal elections, running for the True Path Party (DYP) as the mayoral candidate for Kocaeli. Catching DYP chairwoman and then prime minister Tansu Çiller's attention, Akşener became the chair of the women's branch of the DYP and entered parliament in the 1995 general election as a DYP deputy from Istanbul province. Akşener was a proponent of governing with the Motherland Party but, lacking a majority, Çiller instead formed a coalition government with Necmettin Erbakan's Islamist Refah Party.

From the outset, Akşener was opposed to the arrangement but Çiller kept her close by appointing her as one of the DYP’s general vice presidents, as well as giving her responsibility for the party's General Governing Council and women’s and youth issues. Akşener replaced Mehmet Ağar as Minister of the Interior after his resignation due to his involvement in the Susurluk scandal, becoming the first female interior minister in Turkish history.

Akşener replaced many officials with ties to organized crime but even she was implicated when it emerged that she attended a wedding with Ağar and Abdullah Çatlı. Suspicious of her coalition partner, Akşener backed a rejected bill to replace Refah mayors that were governing against secular principles, which contributed to the escalation of the 1997 military memorandum crisis. During the memorandum, one of the generals at the General Staff of the Turkish Armed Forces threatened to have her impaled in front of the ministry for intervening with the army influencing the police force. She was forced out of office following the collapse of the REFAH-DYP (Refahyol) government, due to the memorandum.

In 1999 she was re-elected to parliament as a deputy for Kocaeli province, but sensing DYP's decline, she led a group of DYP members against Çiller by courting other right-wing parties. On 4 July 2001, Akşener left the DYP for the "innovative wing" of the Welfare Party, led by Abdullah Gül and Recep Tayyip Erdoğan. The innovative wing founded the AKP on 14 August. However she was dissatisfied with the continuation of the National Outlook (Turkish: Milli Görüş) ideology in the new party, and joined the Nationalist Movement Party (MHP) in 3 November. She immediately became chief advisor for political affairs to the MHP chair Devlet Bahçeli. However like most of the long-established parties, the MHP was ejected from parliament when it wasn't able to clear the 10% threshold for entering parliament in the 2002 election, and Akşener lost her seat.

== MHP deputy ==
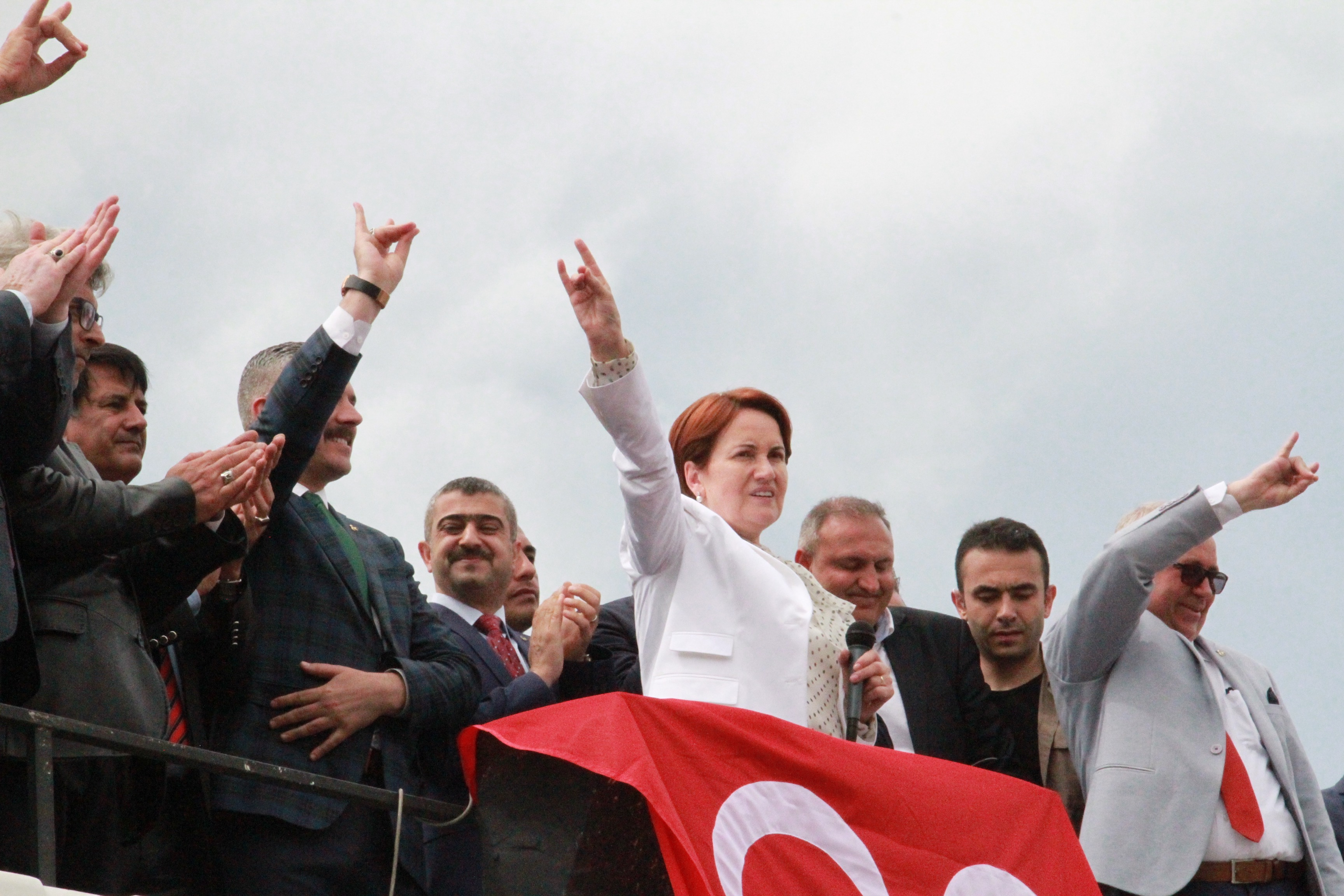
Akşener flashing the Grey Wolf salute after delivering a speech at the illegal MHP congress, 2016

She was MHP's candidate for the Istanbul mayoralty in the 2004 mayoral elections. Akşener rejoined parliament in 2007, representing Istanbul province, and was elected vice-speaker of the parliament alongside Güldal Mumcu, another female politician, serving as Turkey's first female vice-speaker since 1968. She served in the Turkey-China Inter-Parliamentary Friendship Group of the parliament. She was re-elected as an MP in the 2011 and June 2015 general elections. However, she was not included on the MHP's lists for the November 2015 snap election.

When the MHP lost half of its MPs in the election and Bahçeli openly supported Erdoğan; Akşener demanded an extraordinary congress to oust him. On 8 September 2016, she was expelled from the MHP and was accused of having links to 2016 putschists. She promised to start her own political party.

== Leader of the Good Party ==
Under her leadership, the Good Party was founded on 25 October 2017. In her first address to her followers, Akşener said she believed that Turkish democracy was "under threat" and that the Good Party wanted a free society and to fix the problems of the Turkish judiciary system.

Akşener further stated that the "media should not be under pressure. Democratic participation, a strong parliament, and the national will are irreplaceable. We will democratize the law on political parties along contemporary democratic principles and the criteria of the Venice Commission." Aksener said that many who were joining her movement were young Turkish citizens who were "chafing under the restrictions" imposed by the government on public gatherings, freedom of expression, and constraints on the media.

Initially, the Good Party only had five MPs, not enough to form a parliamentary group to participate in an election, but Kemal Kılıçdaroğlu, leader of the Republican People's Party (CHP), transferred 15 MPs to her party to allow it to compete in the 2018 general election. On 1 May, the CHP, Good Party, Felicity Party, and Democrat Party formed the Nation Alliance as an electoral alliance to challenge the People's Alliance made up of the AKP and MHP. Akşener was the Good Party's presidential candidate in the election and received 7.3% of the vote, while her party captured 43 seats.

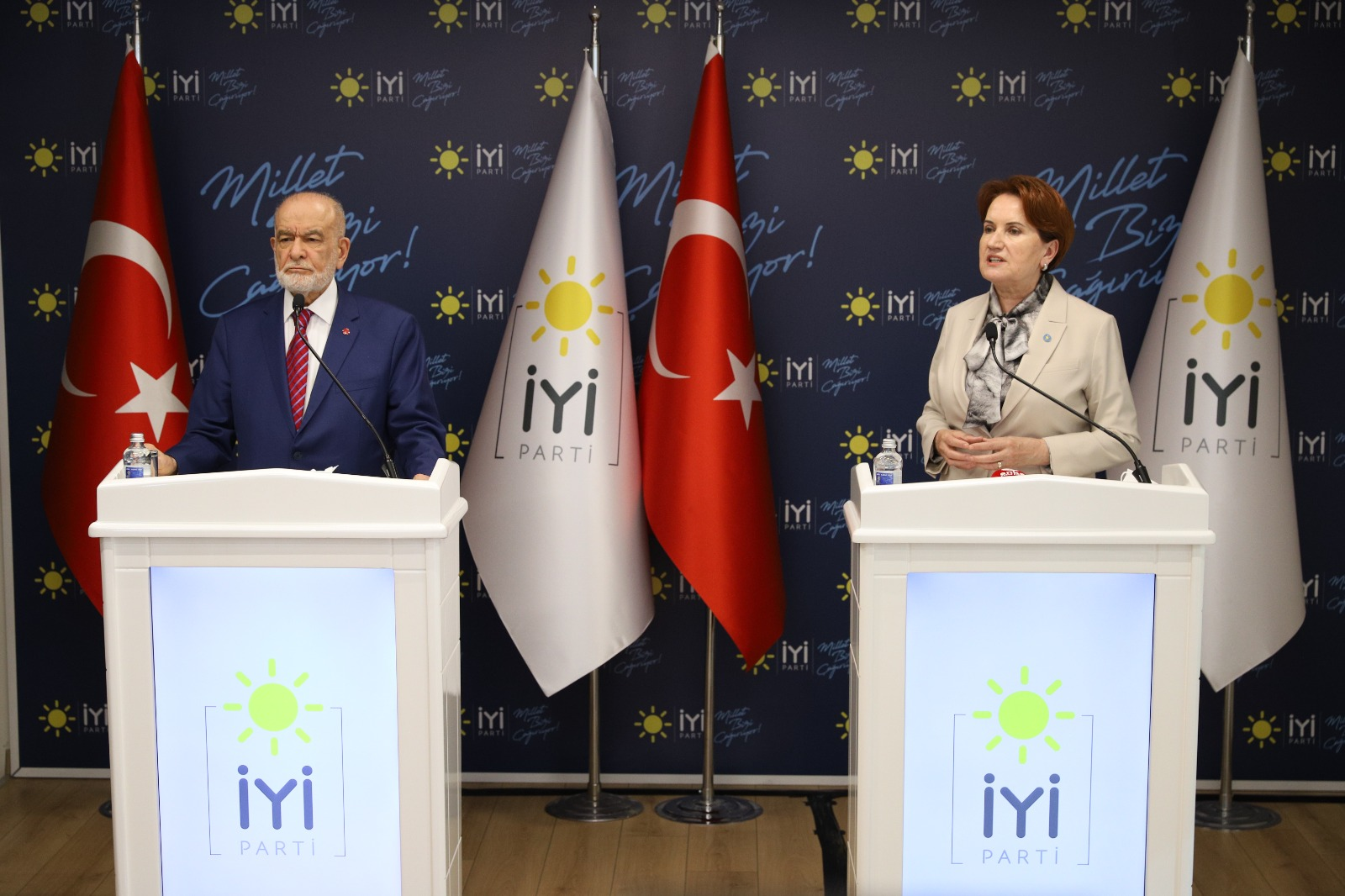
Meral Akşener and Temel Karamollaoğlu, 2021

The Nation Alliance continued with the 2019 local elections. After negotiations between Akşener and Kılıçdaroğlu, the CHP and Good Party agreed to compete in separate provinces, and nominated Mansur Yavaş as a joint candidate for the Ankara mayoralty. The two campaigned together during the election. While the Good Party didn't win any mayoralties, Yavaş won Ankara, the CHP took the cities of Istanbul, Bolu, Antalya, Mersin, Bilecik, Artvin, Ardahan and Kırşehir from the AKP, and the Good Party was the third most popular party. Akşener condemned the decision to repeat the Istanbul Metropolitan Municipality elections. During the election campaign, she toured every district of Istanbul and supported Ekrem İmamoğlu in his campaign.

Akşener has refused to run for president in the presidential election of 2023, instead saying that she would run for prime minister once the opposition is able to return Turkey to a parliamentary system. She agreed to invite the DEVA and Future Party to the Nation Alliance, turning it into a 6-party coalition, called the Table of Six.

On 3 March 2023, Akşener abruptly announced her withdrawal from the Nation Alliance, and announced her party would not support main opposition CHP leader Kemal Kılıçdaroğlu as the joint candidate in the 2023 presidential election, imploring the mayors of Istanbul and Ankara, Ekrem İmamoğlu or Mansur Yavaş of the CHP, to run instead. She stated that the other four parties of the alliance secretly agreed to support Kılıçdaroğlu as their candidate if the CHP put their some 70 of their MPs on its lists; this claim was refuted by DEVA's deputy chairman Mehmet Emin Ekmen. İmamoğlu and Yavaş chose to stand by their chairman. On 6 March, she and her party rejoined the Table of Six after intense public criticism and after it was announced that Ekrem İmamoğlu and Mansur Yavaş would be appointed Vice-Presidents if Kılıçdaroğlu wins the presidential election. Kılıçdaroğlu lost the presidential election, and the Good Party received 9.7% of the vote in the parliamentary election. Akşener announced the dissolution of the Nation Alliance after the election.

Some commentators speculated that her very public withdrawal might have cost the opposition the election by showing to voters the disunity of the coalition. Aytun Çıray, a former Good Party MP and General Secretary, has claimed Akşener's move was a conspiracy initiated by Erdoğan to spoil the unity of the opposition.

In the lead up to the 2024 local elections, Akşener announced that her party would enter on its own lists across all 81 provinces, including against her previous clients, İmamoğlu and Yavaş. During the campaign period, she harshly criticized the CHP and the two mayors, aiming to present her party as a third way. The Good Party polled its worst ever result with 3.7% nationally and the sixth largest party, winning only the municipality of Nevşehir. In a press release on 8 April 2024, Akşener announced that the Good Party would host an extraordinary leadership congress, and that she would not run for reelection as a candidate for the chairmanship. She was succeeded by her preferred candidate: Müsavat Dervişoğlu, in the party's fifth extraordinary congress.

Defamation cases against the President

President and AKP Chairman Recep Tayyip Erdoğan has dropped his lawsuits and complaints against former IYI Party Chairperson Meral Akşener.

Recep Tayyip Erdoğan's lawyer Hüseyin Aydın made a statement on his social media account: "Our esteemed President has waived his lawsuits and complaints against Meral Akşener. In this context, the complaint was withdrawn in three investigation files opened on the charge of insulting the President, and four civil lawsuits for moral damages were waived."

== After the party leadership ==
=== Resignation as leader ===
the IYI party's vote fell from 7.3% to in the 2019 local election to 3.7% in the in the March 2024 local elections, placing it 6th nationally. Akşener had taken the party into the election on its own lists, a decision that drew criticism from within the party and was followed by resignation of prominent members. Om 1 April she announced that an extraordinary congress will take place, and on 8 April she said she will not stand for a re-election for chair. At the party's fifth extraordinary congress 27 April 2024 Müsavat Dervişoğlu, whom Akşener supported was selected leader in the third round of voting.

Later developments

On 5 June 2024 President Erdoğan received Akşener at the presidential complex in Ankara. Neither side issued a statement on the meeting beyond photographs. the meeting caused friction within the party, Dervişoğlu criticised, without mentioning her, politics conducted by the palace. Akşener denied claims that the meeting was linked to a court case involving a businessman and said she had not opened an office after leaving the party. On 27 June, founding member Koray Aydin resigned from the party blaming Akşener's leadership for its decline and calling the meeting with Erdoğan the final straw.

On 30 October 2024, Erdoğan's lawyer announced that Erdoğan had withdrawn three criminal complaints for insulting the president and four civil suits for not pecuniary damages against Akşener.

== Views and ideology ==
Akşener, in addition to being the first woman candidate for the Turkish presidency in history, put great emphasis on women's rights in Turkey and made this a central plank of her presidential campaign. Her campaign drew attention to the drastic increase of cases of violence against women and rape in Turkey under AKP administration. Akşener declared her pledge to lift good conduct time in all cases of violence against women and rape, and instead of forcefully sending women to therapy in such cases, her party would send the perpetrator to mandatory therapy before or after serving their sentence and therapy for women would be optional. She is heavily against child marriages. Although there was an increase in participation of women in the workforce in Turkey, Akşener stated she finds this inadequate and would implement benevolent sexism to increase participation of women in workforce and to reduce the wage gap.

Akşener has been an animal rights advocate throughout her career, and has campaigned for the full adoption of UNESCO Animal Rights Declaration. She adopted a cat named Cedric, which was found raped and covered in blood on a street in Foça, Izmir.

During her MHP days as Deputy Speaker of the Grand National Assembly, even back in 2010, Akşener held a pro-EU stance and held many meetings with EU officials representing Turkey, and was described as the head of the pro-European wing inside the MHP.

Akşener criticized the move by the Erdoğan administration to purchase S-400 missile systems from Russia in a move to distance the country from NATO and the West, stating that the move lacks common sense and wisdom and invited Erdoğan for calmness and to have "information on history". Akşener explained that the move makes no sense as the missiles are not compatible with the existing infrastructure of the Turkey's military, which is integrated to common NATO defense systems, saying that in case of conclusion of such a purchase and its delivery, the S400 missiles would just rot in hangars. She went on to say that such moves by the ruling AKP degraded Turkey's foreign policy, conflicting with 150-year-old Turkish foreign policy principles.

In an April 2020 interview, she stated that she was in favour of reinstating the death penalty in Turkey for terrorists and perpetrators of violence against women.

== Controversies ==
During the 1990s, Akşener threatened journalists who spoke out against the government, saying: "Until now, we have succeeded in preventing any unwanted event happening. Still we will try. But after today, we know we will have difficulty in holding back our Tansu-Çiller-fanatical youths. We are warning you for the last time."

In 2016, Akşener claimed that her tenure as interior minister saw security services conduct "the longest, broadest, and most comprehensive cross-border actions [against the PKK] in history. I’m sorry to say there are some on social media who say ‘Meral Akşener can’t be MHP leader, she’s responsible for unsolved murders.’ Let them say what they will; I’m fine with all of it. If a thing is necessary for this country, for this nation’s unity and togetherness, I will take responsibility right to the end".

While Akşener carried out the military's demands in the lead-up to the 1997 military memorandum, one of her appointees was charged with wiretapping high-ranking commanders of the Turkish Armed Forces, which created friction between her and the Turkish military. One general allegedly threatened to impale her. Though they shared their opposition to the Islamism of the Welfare Party, Akşener's disagreements with the military in the lead-up to the 1997 coup were ultimately over whether the ousting of the Islamists would be done through democratic means or through military intervention.

Akşener accused Abdullah Öcalan of being "Armenian spawn" (Ermeni tohumu).

Akşener frequently uses nicknames for government-aligned politicians, some of which tend to stick. She dubbed Treasury and Finance Minister Berat Albayrak the "Damat" (royal son-in-law) after his marriage to Esra Erdoğan.

== Personal life ==
Meral Gürer married Tuncer Akşener, an engineer, in 1980. Their son, Fatih Akşener, was born in 1984. Meral Akşener has been described as a devout Muslim who prays regularly. She is known to her supporters as Asena, after the mythical she-wolf.

She supports the football teams Galatasaray and Kocaelispor.

== Electoral history ==
=== Parliamentary ===
As an MP

Election	Constituency	Party	Votes			Seats	Elected
Election	Constituency	Party	#	%	Rank	Seats	Elected
1995	Istanbul	True Path Party	641,825	15.39%	4th	11 / 61	Yes
1999	Kocaeli	True Path Party	74,095	13.45%	4th	1 / 10	Yes
2007	Istanbul (III)	Nationalist Movement Party	227,753	11.47%	3rd	3 / 25	Yes
2011	Istanbul (III)	Nationalist Movement Party	257,456	9.97%	3rd	3 / 28	Yes
June 2015	Istanbul (III)	Nationalist Movement Party	323,495	11,4%	4th	4 / 31	Yes

As a party leader

Election	Party	Votes			Seats		Position
Election	Party	#	%	Rank	#	±	Position
2018	Good Party	4,990,710	9.96%	5th	43 / 600	new	Opposition
2023	Good Party	5,272,482	9.69%	4th	43 / 600	▼0.18 pp	Opposition

=== Presidential ===
Election	Votes	%	Outcome
2018	3,649,030	7.29%	4th

=== Local ===
Election	Mayoral election votes	Percentage of votes	Municipal councillor votes	Percentage of votes	Number of municipalities	Number of councillors
2019	3,351,418	7,76%	3,142,757	7,31%	24 / 1,335	1,092 / 20,745
2024	1,735,924	3.77%				

== See also ==
- 2016 Nationalist Movement Party Extraordinary Congress
