= Aytun Çıray =

Turkish politician (born 1957)

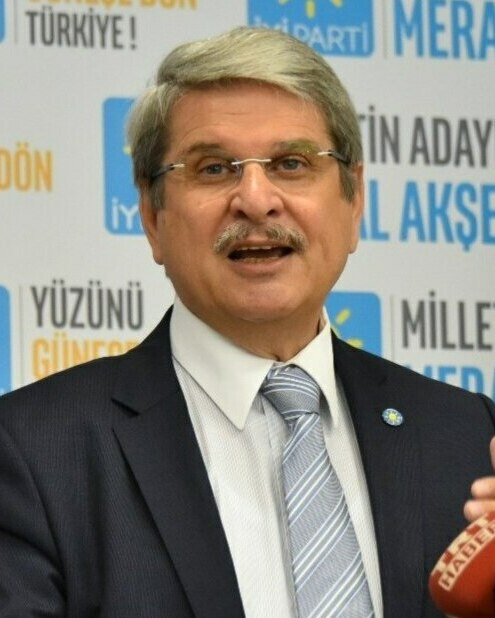

General Secretary of the İYİ Party
- In office 25 October 2017 – 16 August 2018
- Leader: Meral Akşener
- Preceded by: Position established
- Succeeded by: Cihan Paçacı

Member of the Grand National Assembly
- In office 12 June 2011 – 3 June 2023
- Constituency: İzmir (II) (2011, June 2015, Nov 2015, 2018)

Personal details
- Born: 1957 (age 68–69) Bayındır, İzmir, Turkey
- Party: True Path Party (1995-99); Motherland Party (1999-02); Democrat Party (2007); Republican People's Party (2011-17); İYİ Party (2017-2023)
- Children: 2
- Education: Ege University
- Profession: Politician

Aytun Çıray (born 1957) is a Turkish politician. Since 25 October 2017, he serves as the general secretary of the İYİ Party. He is a Member of Parliament for İzmir's second electoral district, having first been elected in the 2011 general election. He is a former member of the Republican People's Party (CHP) and the Democrat Party (DP).

== Early life and career ==
Çıray was born in 1957 in Bayındır, a district of İzmir Province. He graduated from Ege University Faculty of Medicine and specialised in internal Medicine. He later worked as an undersecretary to the Ministry of Health and as an advisor to the Prime Minister of Turkey. He later joined the private sector and held positions in the executives of Petkim, Erdemir and İsdemir. He was the chairman on behalf of Turkey during the 2nd Health Plan loan agreement talks with the World Bank. He can speak French to an advanced degree.

== Political career ==
=== DYP, ANAP and DP ===
In the 1995 general election, Çıray became a prospective parliamentary candidate for the İzmir electoral district from the True Path Party (DYP). In primary elections to determine the party's candidate lists, he placed third but was knocked back to fifth place by the order of the party executive. His party did not receive enough votes in İzmir for him to be elected.

Çıray became a prospective candidate for a second time for the 1999 general election. He placed first on his party's primary list but was barred from standing by the DYP executive. He subsequently left the party and joined the rival centre-right Motherland Party (ANAP). Despite becoming ANAP's second top candidate for İzmir in the 2002 general election, the party fell below the 10% election threshold needed to win seats and was therefore not elected.

In 2007, Çıray joined the Democrat Party and stood for the party leadership in the congress the same year. Although he admitted that he was one of the three top highest polling candidates, he withdrew from the election after criticising the conduct.

=== Republican People's Party (CHP) ===
In the 2011 general election, Çıray was elected as a member of parliament for İzmir's second electoral district from the Republican People's Party (CHP). He was re-elected in the June 2015 general election and the November 2015 snap general election. He announced his resignation from the CHP in October 2017, accusing the opposition parties of being uninterested in formulating solutions for problems faced by voters.

=== İYİ Party ===
Çıray announced that he would join the new party being formed by Meral Akşener in an attempt to 'search for solutions for people's problems'. The new party was announced on 25 October 2017, with the name being unveiled as the İYİ Party. Çıray was appointed as the party's first general secretary by Akşener, becoming the first and most prominent CHP defector to join the new party.

== See also ==
- Grand National Assembly of Turkey
- Ümit Özdağ
