= Sadık Yakut =

Turkish politician (born 1956)

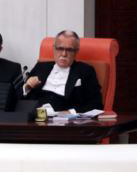

Deputy Speaker of the Grand National Assembly
- In office 9 August 2007 – 23 June 2015
- Speaker: Mehmet Ali Şahin; Cemil Çiçek
- Serving with: İsmail Alptekin; Nevzat Pakdil; Yılmaz Ateş
- Succeeded by: Yurdusev Özsökmenler
- In office 28 November 2002 – 22 July 2007
- Speaker: Bülent Arınç
- Serving with: Ayşe Nur Bahçekapılı; Mehmet Sağlam; Güldal Mumcu; Meral Akşener

Member of the Grand National Assembly
- In office 18 April 1999 – 7 June 2015
- Constituency: Kayseri (1999, 2002, 2007, 2011)

Personal details
- Born: 3 February 1956 (age 70) Pınarbaşı, Kayseri, Turkey
- Party: Nationalist Movement Party (1999-2001); Justice and Development Party (2001-present)
- Education: Istanbul University
- Website: Personal website

Sadık Yakut (born 3 February 1956) is a former Turkish politician from the Justice and Development Party (AKP) who served as the Deputy Speaker of the Grand National Assembly from 2002 to 2007 and again from 2009 to 2015. He was a Member of Parliament for Kayseri between 1999 and 2015, first entering Parliament as a Nationalist Movement Party (MHP) politician and then defecting to the AKP to become one of the party's founding members in 2001.

== Early life and career ==
Sadık Yakut was born on 3 February 1956 in the Büyükkaramanlı village of Pınarbaşı, Kayseri. He graduated from Istanbul University Faculty of Law and served as a prosecutor in the districts of Halfeti, Çamardı and Savaştepe and later in the provinces of Giresun and Ankara. He was a research judge and later a head of department and the Ministry of Justice Department of Prisons and Detention Houses.

== Political career ==
Yakut entered Parliament as a member of the Nationalist Movement Party (MHP) in the 1999 general election as an MP for Kayseri. In 2001, he left the MHP to join the bloc of 'modernist' independent former Felicity Party MPs and eventually became a founding member of the Justice and Development Party (AKP).

Yakut became the Deputy Speaker of the Grand National Assembly after the AKP's victory in the 2002 general election, during which he was re-elected as an MP for Kayseri. He served until 2007 and was re-elected as an MP in the 2007 general election, returning to his role as Deputy Speaker in 2009. He was re-elected as an MP for a final time in the 2011 general election, continuing as Deputy Speaker until 2015, in which he was barred from running for election due to the AKP's three-term limit on its MPs.

== See also ==
- Deputy Speaker of the Grand National Assembly
