= Nazım Ekren =

Turkish economist, academics, politician

Deputy Prime Minister of Turkey
- In office August 28, 2007 – May 1, 2009 Serving with Cemil Çiçek and Hayati Yazıcı
- Prime Minister: Recep Tayyip Erdoğan
- Preceded by: Abdüllatif Şener, Abdullah Gül, Mehmet Ali Şahin
- Succeeded by: Ali Babacan

Personal details
- Born: December 4, 1956 (age 69) Istanbul, Turkey
- Party: Justice and Development Party (AKP)
- Education: Economics
- Alma mater: Bursa Academy of Economics and Finance, Uludağ University
- Profession: Academician, politician

Nazım Ekren (born December 4, 1956, in Istanbul) is a Turkish academic and politician who was the Deputy Prime Minister of Turkey responsible for economic affairs from 2007 until 2009.

== Political career ==
He was appointed to his position in August 2007, succeeding Abdüllatif Şener. Ekren is a former professor of banking and international finance.

Ekren graduated in economics from the Bursa Academy of Economics and Finance (Iktisadi ve Ticari Ilimler Akdemisi), and then received a Master's degree and PhD from Uludağ University in Bursa, going on to a career as an academic in the field of economics at Marmara University in Istanbul.

Ekren was a founding member of Tayyip Erdoğan's Justice and Development Party (AKP). He was elected to the parliament in 2007 as deputy of Istanbul Province.

Nazım Ekren was appointed Deputy Prime Minister, responsible for coordinating economic affairs and for the management of:

- State Planning Organization (Turkey) (DPT)
- Turkish Statistical Institute (DİE)
- Southeastern Anatolia Project (GAP) for regional development.

Ekren was also responsible for relations with:

- the state-owned banks: Ziraat Bank, Halkbank, Türkiye Kalkınma Bankası, and Financial Markets Board (SPK).
- Board of Banking Control and Inspection
- Saving Deposit Insurance Fund (TMSF)

Political offices
Preceded by Abdüllatif Şener; Abdullah Gül; Mehmet Ali Şahin	Deputy Prime Minister of Turkey; August 28, 2007–May 1, 2009; With: Cemil Çiçek and Hayati Yazıcı	Succeeded by Ali Babacan
