= Güldal Mumcu =

Turkish politician (born 1951)

Deputy Speaker of the Grand National Assembly
- In office 10 August 2007 – 7 June 2015
- Speaker: Köksal Toptan; Mehmet Ali Şahin; Cemil Çiçek
- Served with: Sadık Yakut; Mehmet Sağlam; Meral Akşener; Ayşe Nur Bahçekapılı; Nevzat Pakdil; Eyyüp Cenap Gülpınar

Member of the Grand National Assembly
- In office 22 July 2007 – 7 June 2015
- Constituency: İzmir I (2007, 2011)

Personal details
- Born: 20 September 1951 (age 75) Denizli, Turkey
- Party: Republican People's Party (CHP)
- Spouse: Uğur Mumcu (m. 1976; died 1993)
- Children: 2
- Education: Faculty of Political Science, Ankara University
- Occupation: Politician

Şükran Güldal Mumcu (born 20 September 1951) is a Turkish politician.

== Early life ==
She was born to Süreyya and his spouse Emine Necla in Denizli, Turkey, on 20 September 1951. She graduated from Ankara College and Faculty of Political Sciences of Ankara University.

Between 1975 and 1979, she served in the State Investment Bank of Turkey. On 19 July 1976, she married Uğur Mumcu, a renowned investigative journalist. The next year, she gave birth to their son Özgür, and in 1981 to their daughter Özge. Uğur Mumcu was assassinated on 24 January 1993. The next year, Güldal Mumcu established a foundation of journalism named after her husband. One of the books the foundation published was her book İçimden Geçen Zaman ("The Time Passes Through Me"), which was about her life after Uğur Mumcu's assassination.

== Political career ==
In the elections held in 2007, she got elected to the parliament as a deputy of İzmir Province from the Republican People's Party (CHP). On the 10 August 2007 Mumcu and Meral Akşener were elected as Vice Speakers of the Grand National Assembly. After Nermin Neftçi in the 1970s, they became the first women to hold this post. She continued up to 2015. On 1 February 2010, she accused Deputy Prime Minister Bülent Arınç, who tried to interfere her conduct while managing a session. She said that the executive can not control the Legislature.
