= İmdat Sütlüoğlu =

Turkish politician (born 1953)

İmdat Sütlüoğlu MP

Chairman and CEO of ÇAYKUR
- Incumbent
- Assumed office 26 April 2011
- Minister: Mehmet Mehdi Eker; Kutbettin Arzu; Faruk Çelik
- Preceded by: Ekrem Yüce

Minister of Environment
- In office 19 November 2002 – 14 March 2003
- Preceded by: Fevzi Aytekin
- Succeeded by: Kürşad Tüzmen

Member of the Grand National Assembly
- In office 3 November 2002 – 22 July 2007
- Constituency: Rize (2002)

Mayor of Ardeşen
- In office 1994–2002
- Preceded by: Avni Kabaoğlu
- Succeeded by: Mümtaz Sinan

Personal details
- Born: 2 October 1953 (age 73) Ardeşen, Rize Province Turkey
- Party: Refah Party; Fazilet Party; AK Party
- Education: İstanbul Academy of Economics and Commercial Sciences (BA); Karadeniz Technical University (MA)

İmdat Sütlüoğlu (born 2 October 1953) is a Turkish politician and administrator. He is the chairman and CEO of the ÇAYKUR (General Directorate of Tea Enterprises) since 26 April 2011. He served as a Member of Parliament for Rize from AK Party between 2002 and 2007. He was Minister of Environment at Cabinet Gül. He also was the Mayor of Ardeşen between 1994 and 2002.
