= Ertuğrul Yalçınbayır =

Turkish politician

Ertugrul Yalçınbayır

Deputy Prime Minister of Turkey
- In office 18 November 2002 – 14 March 2003
- Prime Minister: Abdullah Gül
- Preceded by: Şükrü Sina Gürel
- Succeeded by: Abdüllatif Şener

Member of the Grand National Assembly
- In office 8 January 1996 – 23 July 2007
- Constituency: Bursa (1995, 1999, 2002)

Personal details
- Born: July 1, 1946 (age 79) Haskovo, Bulgaria
- Party: Republican People's Party (1970s); Welfare Party (1985 - 1999); Motherland Party (1999 - 2001); Justice and Development Party (2001 - 2007)

Ertuğrul Yalçınbayır (born 1946) is a Turkish politician and lawyer who served as the Deputy Prime Minister in the cabinet of Prime Minister Abdullah Gül between 2002 and 2003 as a member of the Justice and Development Party (AKP). He left it before the 2007 general election.

He was first elected as a Member of Parliament from the Islamist Welfare Party in 1995 and was re-elected in 1999 from the Virtue Party and 2002 from the AKP. In the 1970s, he had worked for the Republican People's Party (CHP).
