= Ayşe Nur Bahçekapılı =

Turkish politician (born 1954)

Ayşe Nur Bahçekapılı MP
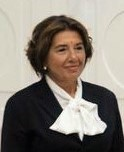

Deputy Speaker of the Grand National Assembly
- In office 24 November 2015 – 7 July 2018
- Speaker: İsmail Kahraman
- Serving with: Ahmet Aydın; Akif Hamzaçebi (2015–17); Yaşar Tüzün (2017–18); Pervin Buldan (2015–18); Mithat Sancar (2018)
- Preceded by: Koray Aydın
- Succeeded by: Celal Adan
- In office 2 July 2013 – 23 June 2015
- Speaker: Cemil Çiçek
- Serving with: Sadık Yakut; Güldal Mumcu; Meral Akşener
- Preceded by: Mehmet Sağlam
- Succeeded by: Koray Aydın

Member of the Grand National Assembly
- In office 22 July 2007 – 24 June 2018
- Constituency: Istanbul (II) (2007, 2011, June 2015, Nov 2015)

Personal details
- Born: 26 November 1954 (age 71) Maçka, Trabzon, Turkey
- Party: Justice and Development Party
- Other party: Social Democratic Populist Party (before 2007)
- Education: Law
- Alma mater: Istanbul University

Ayşe Nur Bahçekapılı (born 26 November 1954) is a Turkish politician from the Justice and Development Party (AKP) who currently serves as a Deputy Speaker of the Grand National Assembly since 24 November 2015. She previously served in the same position between 2 July and 23 June 2015. She has been a Member of Parliament for Istanbul's second electoral district since 22 July 2007, having first been elected in the 2007 general election and re-elected in the 2011, June 2015 and November 2015 general elections.

== Early life and career ==
Ayşe Nur Bahçekapılı was born on 26 November 1954 in the district of Maçka, Trabzon Province. She graduated from Istanbul University Faculty of Law and later become a freelance lawyer. She served as a member of the executive board of the Istanbul Bar Association and also as their General Secretary. She has also been a member of the executive board for the Turkish Bars Association. She was a member of the Contemporary Jurists Association and also served as the Istanbul representative of the Social Democrat Action Platform Women's legal education workshop.

== Political career ==
Originally she served as the President of the Social Democratic Populist Party (SHP) Istanbul Women's Commission but later joined the conservative Justice and Development Party (AKP). She was elected as a Member of Parliament for Istanbul's second electoral district in the 2007 general election and was re-elected in the 2011, June 2015 and November 2015 general elections. In the 23rd and 24th Parliaments (2007 to 2015), she served as the President of the Turkish-Cuban inter-parliamentary friendship group.

She was not renominated for the 2018 parliamentary election.

== Deputy Speaker ==
Bahçekapılı first became a Deputy Speaker of the Grand National Assembly on 2 July 2013, halfway through the course of the 24th Parliament. She served until the end of the parliamentary term on 23 June 2015. Serving under Speaker Cemil Çiçek, she served alongside AKP colleague Sadık Yakut, the Republican People's Party (CHP) MP Güldal Mumcu and the Nationalist Movement Party (MHP) MP Meral Akşener.

She was appointed a Deputy Speaker for a second time on 24 November 2015, serving in the 26th Parliament. Serving under Speaker İsmail Kahraman, she serves alongside AKP colleague Ahmet Aydın, the CHP MP Akif Hamzaçebi and the Peoples' Democratic Party (HDP) MP Pervin Buldan.

== See also ==
- Speaker of the Grand National Assembly
