= Bülent Arınç =

22nd Speaker of the Parliament of Turkey

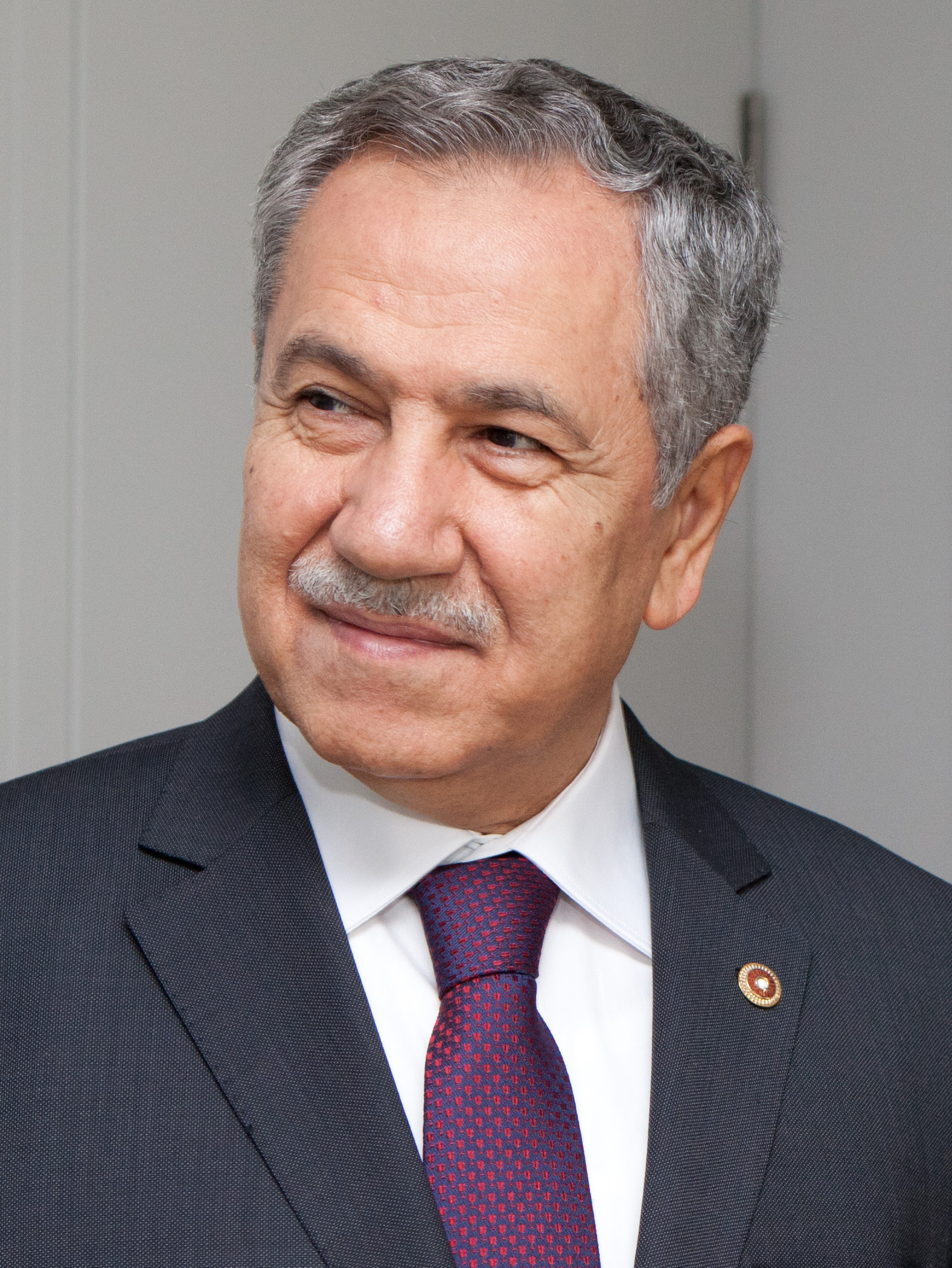
- Arınç in 2010

Deputy Prime Minister of Turkey
- In office 1 May 2009 – 28 August 2015
- Prime Minister: Recep Tayyip Erdoğan; Ahmet Davutoğlu
- Serving with: Cemil Çiçek (2009-11); Ali Babacan (2009-15); Beşir Atalay (2011-14); Bekir Bozdağ (2011-13); Emrullah İşler (2013-14); Numan Kurtulmuş (2014-15); Yalçın Akdoğan (2014-15)
- Preceded by: Hayati Yazıcı
- Succeeded by: Tuğrul Türkeş

22nd Speaker of the Grand National Assembly
- In office 19 November 2002 – 22 July 2007
- President: Ahmet Necdet Sezer
- Deputy: İsmail Alptekin; Nevzat Pakdil; Sadık Yakut; Yılmaz Ateş
- Preceded by: Ömer İzgi
- Succeeded by: Köksal Toptan

Member of the Grand National Assembly
- In office 8 January 1996 – 7 June 2015
- Constituency: Manisa (1995, 1999, 2002, 2007); Bursa (2011)

Personal details
- Born: 25 May 1948 (age 78) Bursa, Turkey
- Party: Welfare Party (Before 1997); Virtue Party (1997–2001); Justice and Development Party (2001–)
- Spouse: Münevver Arınç (m. 1979)
- Children: Mehmet Fatih (deceased); Ayşenur; Mücahit
- Education: Ankara University
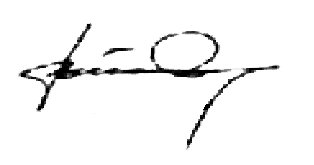
- Signature

Bülent Arınç (Turkish pronunciation: [byˈlænt aˈɾɯntʃ]; born 25 May 1948) is a conservative Turkish politician. He served as the 22nd Speaker of the Parliament of Turkey from 2002 to 2007 and as a Deputy Prime Minister of Turkey between 2009 and 2015. He also co-founded the Justice and Development Party (AKP) in 2001.

== Early life and education ==
He was born on May 25, 1948, in Bursa, Turkey. After finishing high school in Manisa, Bülent Arınç attended University of Ankara, earning a Bachelor of Laws degree in 1970. After his graduation, he worked as a freelance lawyer in Manisa. He is of Grecophone Cretan Turk heritage with his ancestors arriving to Turkey as Cretan refugees during the time of Sultan Abdul Hamid II to escape massacres and is fluent in Cretan Greek.

== Entry into politics ==
Interested in politics from his university years, Bülent Arınç ran for the deputy of Manisa in the 1995 general elections, and entered the Turkish Grand National Assembly from the Welfare Party (Turkish: Refah Partisi). He became also a member of the board of his party, and served in the parliament's justice commission.

Following the closing of the Welfare Party by the Constitutional Court of Turkey on February 15, 1998, he transferred to the Virtue Party (Turkish: Fazilet Partisi). Arınç was elected in the 1999 general elections as deputy of Manisa, this time from the Virtue Party. He became a member of the foreign affairs commission of the parliament.

The constitutional court closed the Virtue Party on June 22, 2001. Bülent Arınç, along with Recep Tayyip Erdoğan, co-founded the Justice and Development Party (Turkish: Adalet ve Kalkınma Partisi) the same year on August 14. He was appointed speaker of his party's group in the parliament.

Bülent Arınç was elected the third time deputy of Manisa in the general elections held on November 3, 2002. On November 19, 2002, he was elected Speaker of the Parliament. On May 1, 2009, he was appointed as State Minister Responsible for Foundations and the Turkish Radio and Television Corporation (TRT; Turkish: Türkiye Radyo ve Televizyon Kurumu) and Deputy Prime Minister in the second cabinet of Erdoğan.

== Views ==
In 2012, Arınç opposed education in the Kurdish language as he didn't deem it a "language of civilization".

In 2013, Arınç referred to the Hagia Sophia as a mosque, which angered the Greek government. He expressed the wish to see it reconverted from a museum into a functioning mosque.

In 2014, Arınç stated women should not laugh out loud to him in public during a speech about "moral corruption" at an Eid al-Fitr holiday gathering: "She will not laugh in public to Mr. Arinc. She will not be inviting in her attitudes and will protect her chasteness." When asked to explain his comments, he suggested that women "leave their husbands at home, and go to vacation with their lovers" and that they "can't wait to climb poles when they see someone", referring to women who pole dance while on holiday. Both comments were widely ridiculed in social media.

In November 2020, Arınç resigned as a member of the High Advisory Board of the Turkish presidency, demanding political reforms in the. He referred to the juridical situation in Turkey and advocated for the release of the philanthropist Osman Kavala and the Kurdish politician Selahattin Demirtaş of the Peoples Democratic Party.

Then in 2020 he encouraged the Turkish society to read the book Devran of Demirtaş, mentioning that the Kurds are the oppressed in Turkey. This drew a harsh criticism from Erdoğan, who denied there was a Kurdish issue in Turkey and branded Demirtaş as a terrorist.

== Personal life ==
Bülent Arınç is married with two children. His third child, a son, was killed in a traffic accident in 1997.

Political offices
Preceded by Ömer İzgi	Speaker of the Parliament; 2002–2007	Succeeded by Köksal Toptan
Preceded by Hayati Yazıcı	Third Deputy Prime Minister of Turkey; 2009–2015	Succeeded by Tuğrul Türkeş
