= Turkey Party =

Turkey Party Türkiye Partisi
- Leader: Abdüllatif Şener
- Founded: May 25, 2009
- Dissolved: August 27, 2012
- Headquarters: Çankaya, Ankara
- Ideology: Conservative liberalism
- Political position: Centre-right

Turkey Party (Türkiye Partisi, TP) was a conservative liberal party in Turkey, which was founded on 25 May 2009 by Abdüllatif Şener in Çankaya, Ankara. It had one seat in Turkish Grand National Assembly.

Şener announced that the party was officially closed on August 27, 2012 due to difficulties to maintain the political goals outside the parliament.
