= Fahri Kasırga =

Turkish lawyer and politician (born 1953)

Secretary General of the Turkish Presidency
- Incumbent
- Assumed office 11 September 2014
- Preceded by: Mustafa İsen

Turkish Prime Ministry Undersecretary
- In office 20 January 2014 – 11 September 2014
- Preceded by: Özer Kontoğlu
- Succeeded by: Özer Kontoğlu

Minister of Justice of Turkey
- In office 8 May 2007 – 29 August 2007
- Preceded by: Cemil Çiçek
- Succeeded by: Mehmet Ali Şahin

Personal details
- Born: January 20, 1953 (age 73) Rize, Turkey

Fahri Kasırga (born 20 January 1953, Rize, Turkey) is a Turkish lawyer and the current Secretary General of the Presidency of Turkey. In accordance with Article 114 of the Constitution of Turkey, he has served as a non-party Minister of Justice until the 2007 general elections, after which he joined the Justice and Development Party of Prime Minister Recep Tayyip Erdoğan.

He graduated from Istanbul University in 1977.

Political offices
Preceded by Cemil Çiçek	Minister of Justice; 8 May 2007 – 29 August 2007	Succeeded by Mehmet Ali Şahin
Preceded by Efkan Ala	Undersecretary of the Prime Ministry of Turkey; 20 January 2014 – 11 September 2014	Succeeded by Ergin Ergül (deputy)
Preceded by Mustafa İsen	Secretary General of the Presidency of Turkey; 11 September 2014 -	Incumbent
