= Yumak and Sadak v Turkey =

Yumak and Sadak v. Turkey (application No. 10226/03) was a case before the European Court of Human Rights on the requirement for parties standing in Turkish parliamentary elections to meet the threshold of 10% of the votes cast at Turkish parliamentary elections in order to gain seats, decided in 2008.

== Facts ==
The applicants stood in the 2002 parliamentary elections for the Grand National Assembly but their party, DEHAP, did not achieve the 10% of votes necessary to be eligible for seats in parliament. In fact, that year some 45% of active voters weren't represented in parliament due to the threshold (Chamber judgment, Para. 13).

== Judgments ==
Both the original Chamber in 2007 and the Grand Chamber in 2008 found no violation of Article 3 of Protocol No. 1 to ECHR (right to free elections) in the case, by five votes to two and thirteen to four. However, they noted that "it would be desirable for the threshold complained of to be lowered and/or for corrective counterbalances to be introduced to ensure optimal representation of the various political tendencies" (Chamber judgment, Para. 77) and labeled the threshold as "excessive" (Grand Chamber judgment, Para. 147)

Dissents were expressed by judges Cabral Barreto and Mularoni in Chamber and by judges Tulkens, Vajić, Jaeger and Šikuta in Grand Chamber.

== Evaluation ==
"Zdanoka v Latvia and Yumak and Sadak v Turkey are easy targets for those who would argue that the standards set by the Court under Article 3 are simply too low. However, they are certainly the types of cases which Judge Levits had in mind when he observed that the Court faces a 'dilemma' when examining applications under Article 3: 'on the one hand...it is the Court's task to protect the electoral rights of individuals; but, on the other hand, it should not overstep the limits of its explicit and implicit legitimacy and try to rule instead of the people on the constitutional order which this people creates for itself' "
