= Burhanettin Uysal =

Turkish academic and politician (1967–2021)

Member of the Grand National Assembly of Turkey
- In office 1 November 2015 – 7 July 2018
- Constituency: Karabük (Nov 2015)

Rector of Karabük University
- In office 17 January 2008 – 10 February 2015

Personal details
- Born: 20 June 1967 Ereğli, Turkey
- Died: 3 May 2021 (aged 53) Ankara, Turkey
- Party: AKP

Burhanettin Uysal (20 June 1967 – 3 May 2021) was a Turkish politician and academic.

== Biography ==
Uysal attended Gazi University and subsequently graduated from the Turkish National Police Academy in 1992. He then earned both a master's degree and a doctorate from Gazi University. He served as a lecturer at Van Yüzüncü Yıl University from 1994 to 1997 and was an assistant professor at Zonguldak Bülent Ecevit University from 1997 to 2000. That year, he became an associate professor, and he became a full professor in 2006.

In 2008, Uysal was appointed to be Rector of Karabük University by Turkey Abdullah Gül. However, he resigned on 10 February 2015 to run for the Grand National Assembly of Turkey as a member of the Justice and Development Party. He was elected on 1 November 2015 to serve in the 26th Parliament of Turkey, representing Karabük.

Burhanettin Uysal was diagnosed with COVID-19 on 2 April 2021. He died at Ankara Bilkent City Hospital on 3 May 2021, aged 53. He was buried in Ereğli the following day.
