= Cemil Çiçek =

25th Speaker of the Parliament of Turkey

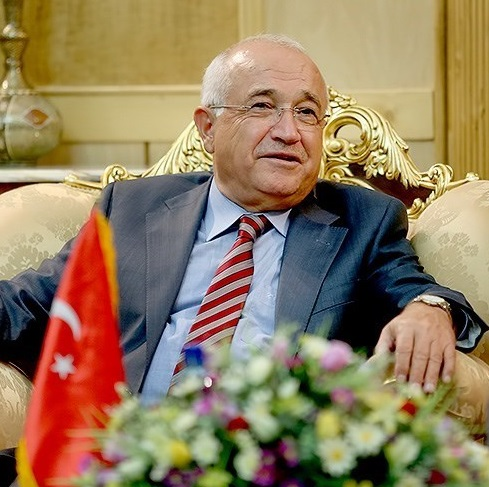
- Çiçek in 2014

25th Speaker of the Grand National Assembly
- In office 4 July 2011 – 23 June 2015
- President: Abdullah Gül; Recep Tayyip Erdoğan
- Deputy: Sadık Yakut; Mehmet Sağlam (2011-13); Ayşe Nur Bahçekapılı (2013-15); Güldal Mumcu; Meral Akşener
- Preceded by: Mehmet Ali Şahin
- Succeeded by: İsmet Yılmaz

Deputy Prime Minister of Turkey
- In office 28 August 2007 – 28 June 2011
- Prime Minister: Recep Tayyip Erdoğan
- Serving with: Hayati Yazıcı; Nazım Ekren; Bülent Arınç; Ali Babacan
- Preceded by: Abdullah Gül
- Succeeded by: Beşir Atalay

Minister of Justice
- In office 20 November 2002 – 8 May 2007
- Prime Minister: Abdullah Gül; Recep Tayyip Erdoğan
- Preceded by: Aysel Çelikel
- Succeeded by: Fahri Kasırga

Minister of State (Responsible for Energy and Natural Resources)
- In office 6 March 1996 – 28 June 1996
- Prime Minister: Mesut Yılmaz

Minister of State (Responsible for Family Affairs)
- In office 21 December 1987 – 23 June 1991
- Prime Minister: Turgut Özal; Yıldırım Akbulut

Member of the Grand National Assembly
- In office 1 November 2015 – 24 June 2018
- Constituency: Ankara (II) (Nov 2015)
- In office 8 January 1996 – 7 June 2015
- Constituency: Ankara (I) (1995, 1999, 2002, 2007); Ankara (II) (2011)
- In office 14 December 1987 – 20 October 1991
- Constituency: Yozgat (1987)

Personal details
- Born: 15 November 1946 (age 79) Yozgat, Turkey
- Party: Justice and Development Party (2001-nowadays)
- Other political affiliations: National Salvation Party [1973–1980]*Motherland Party (1983–1998)*Virtue Party [1998–2001]
- Relations: Mehmet Çiçek (cousin)
- Education: Istanbul University
- Occupation: Politician

Cemil Çiçek (pronounced [dʒemil tʃitʃec]; born 15 November 1946) is a Turkish politician who was the Speaker of the Parliament of Turkey between 4 July 2011 and 7 June 2015. Previously he was Minister of Justice from 2002 to 2007 and Deputy Prime Minister from 2007 to 2011. He was also a Justice and Development Party Member of Parliament from Ankara.

== Early life ==
He was born on 15 November 1946 in Yozgat, Turkey. He graduated from the Law Faculty of Istanbul University. In 1983, he joined the centre-right ANAP. He became an ANAP MP for Yozgat, and in the late 1980s Minister of State responsible for "the family". In this role he was known for his conservative views on matters of sex and marriage.

== Political career ==
He later became Minister for Energy and Natural Resources but was expelled from ANAP in 1997, upon which he joined the Islamic leaning Fazilet Party, which later evolved into the AKP.

He was Minister of Justice in the first AKP government (from 2003 to 2007), when as a former ANAP MP he was thought to be one of the leading figures of the AKP most acceptable to the Turkish military. During his ministry, he had to deal with situations including:

- the 2003 Istanbul bombings
- the release of former MP Leyla Zana from prison,
- the prosecutions of a number of police officers accused of torturing prisoners,
- an attempted suicide bombing of his ministry.

His legislation included stricter controls of prisons (in 2006).

=== Speaker of the Parliament ===
Cemil Çiçek of the AKP became the new parliament speaker of Turkey in the third round of voting on 4 July 2011. Çiçek received 302 votes in the first round voting, while Nationalist Movement Party (MHP) parliamentarian Tunca Toskay received 50 votes. The AKP's second candidate, Zelkif Kazdal, received 23 votes and withdrew his nomination after the first round. Çiçek went on to win 322 votes and Tunca Toskay won 52 in the second round of voting. Çiçek was elected as the new speaker with 322 votes in the third round, in which Toskay received 50 votes. Three votes were declared invalid. In his speech after his election, Çiçek appealed to the opposition parties that were boycotting Parliament to take their oaths. "Parliament should be a place of work, not of conflict. We have many issues to solve. We can't afford to waste any time," Çiçek said. Within the scope of the IV General Assembly of the Parliamentary Assembly of Turkic Speaking Countries (TURKPA), he took over the TURKPA Chairmanship from the Speaker of the Parliament of the Kyrgyz Republic as the Speaker of the Turkish Grand National Assembly at the Assembly Council meeting on June 10, 2013.

In June 2018, he did not apply for parliamentary candidacy for the general elections.

== Quotes ==
- The mentality of the general public is the prime obstacle to rule of law (in Turkey). "Our public does not want justice, they just want their own affairs sorted out. They want to see corruption investigated but they are not ashamed to manage their own affairs corruptly. The public actually doesn't care about corruption. They say "let someone tackle it while we watch and see who wins" as if it were a football match. He then went to blame the professional bodies for not exposing corruption among their members.
- The Islamic world will get nowhere by blaming all its problems on the outside world and making itself out to be a white spoon just pulled out of the milk
- (Upon the release from prison of Leyla Zana..)The Turkish courts have played their part. Now the EU has no excuse (not to begin entry negotiations with Turkey)
- Article 138 of the Constitution has become extinct in this country (the article that guarantees the independence of the judiciary)

Political offices
Preceded by Hakkı Borataş	Mayor of Yozgat; 1 January 1984 – 1 January 1988	Succeeded by Mustafa Erkılıç
Preceded by Bülent Akarcalı	Acting Minister of Health; 26 June 1988 – 6 July 1988	Succeeded by Nihat Kitapçı
Preceded by Aysel Çelikel	Minister of Justice; 18 November 2002 – 8 May 2007	Succeeded by Fahri Kasırga
Preceded by Abdullah Gül	Deputy Prime Minister of Turkey; 28 August 2007 – 28 June 2011	Succeeded by Beşir Atalay
Preceded by Mehmet Ali Şahin	Speaker of the Parliament of Turkey; 4 July 2011 – 8 June 2015	Succeeded by Deniz Baykal
