= Zonguldak (electoral district) =

Electoral district for the Grand National Assembly of Turkey

Coordinates: 41°15′N 31°50′E

- electoral district for the Grand National Assembly of Turkey
- Zonguldak shown within Turkey
- Province: Zonguldak
- Electorate: 455,640

Current electoral district
- Created: 1920
- Seats: 5 Historical: 6 (1995-2002) 7 (1991-1995) 9 (1987-1991) 8 (1983-1987) 9 (1961-1983) 12 (1957-1961) 11 (1954-1957)
- Turnout at last election: 88.42%
- Representation
- AK Party: 3 / 5
- CHP: 2 / 5

Zonguldak is an electoral district of the Grand National Assembly of Turkey. It elects 5 members of parliament (deputies) to represent the province of the same name for a four-year term by the D'Hondt method, a party-list proportional representation system.

== Members ==
Population reviews of each electoral district are conducted before each general election, which can lead to certain districts being granted a smaller or greater number of parliamentary seats. Zonguldak was once represented by as many as twelve MPs, although this has dropped today to five seats, its lowest level yet.

MPs for Zonguldak, 1999 onwards
Seat	1999 (21st parliament)	2002 (22nd parliament)	2007 (23rd parliament)	2011 (24th parliament)	June 2015 (25th parliament)
MP	Veysel Atasoy; Anavatan	Köksal Toptan; AK Party			Hüseyin Özbakır; AK Party
MP	İsmail Hakkı Cerrahoğlu; MHP	Polat Türkmen; AK Party		Ercan Candan; AK Party	Faruk Çaturoğlu; AK Party
MP	Ömer Barutçu; DYP	Fazlı Erdoğan; AK Party		Özcan Ulupınar; AK Party	Zeki Çakan; MHP
MP	Hasan Gemici; DSP	Nadir Saraç; CHP	Ali Koçal; CHP	Mehmet Haberal; CHP	Şerafettin Turpcu; CHP
MP	Ömer Üstünkol; DSP	Harun Akın; CHP	Ali İhsan Köktürk; CHP		Ünal Demirtaş; CHP
MP	Tahsin Boray Baycık; DSP	Seat abolished			

== General elections ==
=== June 2015 ===
General Election June 2015: Zonguldak
Party	Candidate	Votes	%	±%
CHP	Party list: 1. Şerafettin Turpçu; 2. Deniz Yavuz Yılmaz; 3. Harun Akın; 4. Ali İhsan Köktürk; 5. Yaşar Balcı			
Total votes				
Rejected ballots				
Turnout				

=== 2011 ===
2011 Turkish general election: Zonguldak
List	Candidates	Votes	Of total (%)	± from prev.
AK Party	Köksal Toptan,Ercan Candan,Özcan Ulupınar	184,346	47.23	
CHP	Mehmet Haberal,Ali İhsan Köktürk	146,342	37.49	
MHP	None elected	24,633	6.31	
Independents	None elected	11,515	2.95	
SAADET	None elected	8014	2.05	
HAS Party	None elected	3358	0.86	N/A
DP	None elected	2924	0.75	
DSP	None elected	2618	0.67	'"`UNIQ−−ref−00000014−QINU`"'
Büyük Birlik	None elected	2289	0.59	
Labour	None elected	1295	0.33	
DYP	None elected	860	0.22	
TKP	None elected	588	0.15	
MP	None elected	581	0.15	
Nationalist Conservative	None elected	544	0.14	
Liberal Democrat	None elected	418	0.11	
HEPAR	None elected	0		
Turnout		390,325	88.42	

== Presidential elections ==
=== 2014 ===
Presidential Election 2014: Zonguldak
Party	Candidate	Votes	%
AK Party	Recep Tayyip Erdoğan	177,830	52.97
Independent	Ekmeleddin İhsanoğlu	151,379	45.09
HDP	Selahattin Demirtaş	6,536	1.95
Total votes		335,745	100.00
Rejected ballots		10,383	3.00
Turnout		346,128	77.48
Recep Tayyip Erdoğan win			
