= Abdüllatif Şener =

Turkish politician (born 1954)

Abdüllatif Şener MP
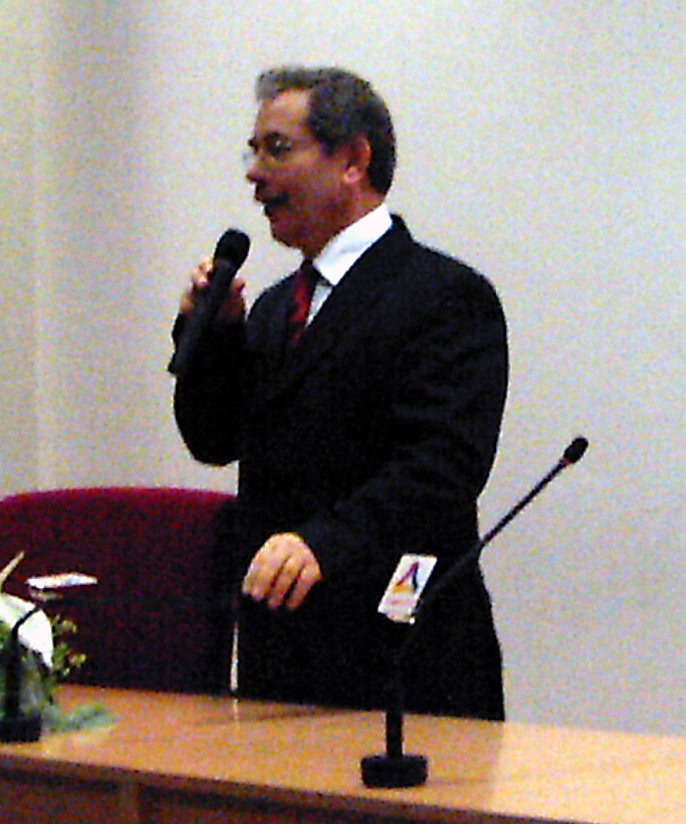

Leader of the Turkey Party
- In office 25 May 2009 – 27 August 2012
- Preceded by: Founded
- Succeeded by: Closed

Deputy Prime Minister of Turkey
- In office 18 November 2002 – 29 August 2007
- Prime Minister: Abdullah Gül; Recep Tayyip Erdoğan
- Preceded by: Devlet Bahçeli; Şükrü Sina Gürel; Mesut Yılmaz
- Succeeded by: Cemil Çiçek; Hayati Yazıcı; Nazım Ekren

Minister of Finance of Turkey
- In office 28 June 1996 – 30 June 1997
- Prime Minister: Necmettin Erbakan
- Preceded by: Lütfullah Kayalar
- Succeeded by: Zekeriya Temizel

Member of the Grand National Assembly
- In office 7 July 2018 – 7 April 2023
- Constituency: Konya (2018)
- In office 6 November 1991 – 23 July 2007
- Constituency: Sivas (1991, 1995, 1999, 2002)

Personal details
- Born: 1954 (age 71–72) Gürün, Sivas Province, Turkey
- Party: CHP (2018-2023); TP (2009-2012); AKP (2001-2009); FP (1998-2001); RP (1991-1998)
- Education: Ankara University, Gazi University
- Occupation: Politician
- Profession: Finance, academic

Abdüllatif Şener (born 1954) is a Turkish politician. He was Minister of Finance of Turkey from 1996 to 1997 and Deputy Prime Minister from 2002 to 2007, under Prime Minister Recep Tayyip Erdoğan.

== Life and career ==
Şener was born in Gürün, Sivas Province in Turkey. He graduated from the School of Political Sciences at Ankara University. He earned his PhD degree from Gazi University in Ankara. He lectured on finance at Gazi University and Hacettepe University, before he served as a controller in the Department of Revenues within the Ministry of Finance.

Şener entered politics and was elected in 1991 as deputy of Sivas Province from the Islamist Welfare Party (Turkish: Refah Partisi, abbreviated RP). He was Minister of Finance from 1996 to 1997. Following the ban of the Welfare Party in 1998, he became a member of the newly established Virtue Party (Turkish: Fazilet Partisi, abbreviated FP), which was also banned after three years in 2001. He was co-founder of the Justice and Development Party (AKP) in 2001. He was elected to the Grand National Assembly of Turkey as deputy of Sivas Province, and he served under the AKP government as Deputy Prime Minister from 2002 to 2007.

He did not run for a seat in parliament in the 2007 general elections. After leaving the AK Party, he formed a new party; it was officially announced on 27 May 2009 and named the Turkey Party (Türkiye Partisi).

Şener announced that the Turkey Party was officially closed on 27 August 2012 due to difficulties in maintaining its political goals outside of parliament.

In an interview with Halk TV, Şener strongly condemned the AK Party's handling of the 2013 protests in Turkey.

Party political offices
Preceded by Newly Founded	Leader of the Turkey Party; 25 May 2009–27 August 2012	Succeeded by Closed
Political offices
Preceded by Lütfullah Kayalar	Minister of Finance of Turkey; 28 June 1996 – 30 June 1997	Succeeded by Zekeriya Temizel
Preceded by Devlet Bahçeli; Şükrü Sina Gürel; Mesut Yılmaz	Deputy Prime Minister of Turkey; 18 November 2002 – 29 August 2007	Succeeded by Cemil Çiçek; Hayati Yazıcı; Nazım Ekren
