= Büyükkadı, Sur =

Büyükkadı
- Neighbourhood
- Location in Turkey
- Coordinates: 38.01066°N 40.29811°E
- Country: Turkey
- Province: Diyarbakır
- District: Sur
- Time zone: UTC+3 (TRT)

Büyükkadı (Syriac: Al-Qaḍyiah) (Note: Also known as al-Qadi, Büyükkadıköyü, Kadikeoy, Kadikoy Fara, Kadia, Kadi, and Kadié.) is a neighbourhood of the municipality and district of Sur, Diyarbakır Province, southeastern Turkey.

== History ==
Al-Qaḍyiah (today called Büyükkadı) was historically inhabited by Armenians and Syriac Orthodox Christians. Timothy Shukr Allah, son of Yusuf, metropolitan of Amid in 1690–1714, was from Al-Qaḍyiah. In the Syriac Orthodox patriarchal register of dues of 1870, it was recorded that the village had 17 households, who paid 19 dues, and did not have a priest. The village was plundered during the Massacres of Diyarbekir (1895). It was located in the Diyarbakır central district (merkez kaza) in the Diyarbakır sanjak in the Diyarbekir vilayet in c. 1900. In 1914, it was inhabited by 200 Syriacs, according to the list presented to the Paris Peace Conference by the Assyro-Chaldean delegation.

== Bibliography ==
- Abed Mshiho Neman of Qarabash (2021) [1918]. Sayfo – An Account of the Assyrian Genocide. Translated by Michael Abdalla; Łukasz Kiczko. Edinburgh University Press.
- Barsoum, Aphrem (2009). History of the Syriac Dioceses. Vol. 1. Translated by Matti Moosa. Gorgias Press.
- Bcheiry, Iskandar (2009). The Syriac Orthodox Patriarchal Register of Dues of 1870: An Unpublished Historical Document from the Late Ottoman Period. Gorgias Press.
- Courtois, Sébastien de (2004). The Forgotten Genocide: Eastern Christians, The Last Arameans. Translated by Vincent Aurora. Gorgias Press.
- Gaunt, David (2006). Massacres, Resistance, Protectors: Muslim-Christian Relations in Eastern Anatolia during World War I. Gorgias Press.
- Jongerden, Joost; Verheij, Jelle, eds. (2012). Social Relations in Ottoman Diyarbekir, 1870-1915. Brill.
