= Beşir Atalay =

Turkish politician (born 1947)

Beşir Atalay MP
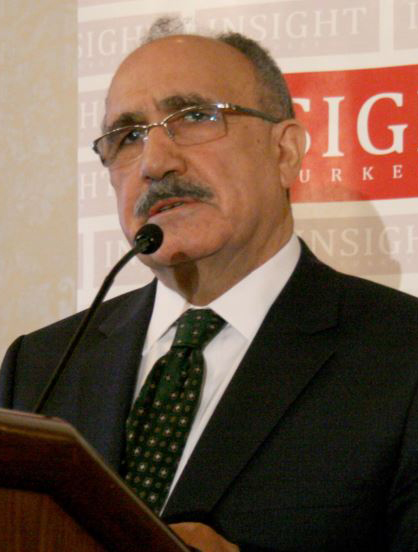

Deputy Prime Minister of Turkey
- In office 14 July 2011 – 29 August 2014
- Prime Minister: Recep Tayyip Erdoğan
- Serving with: Bülent Arınç; Ali Babacan; Bekir Bozdağ; Emrullah İşler
- Preceded by: Cemil Çiçek
- Succeeded by: Numan Kurtulmuş

Minister of the Interior
- In office 28 August 2007 – 14 July 2011
- Prime Minister: Recep Tayyip Erdoğan
- Preceded by: Abdülkadir Aksu
- Succeeded by: İdris Naim Şahin

Minister of state
- In office 19 November 2002 – 28 August 2007
- Prime Minister: Recep Tayyip Erdoğan

Member of the Grand National Assembly
- In office 1 November 2015 – 24 June 2018
- Constituency: Van (Nov 2015)
- In office 14 November 2002 – 7 June 2015
- Constituency: Ankara (II) (2002, 2007); Kırıkkale (2011)

Personal details
- Born: 15 January 1947 (age 79) Keskin, Turkey
- Party: Justice and Development Party (2001 - 2019)
- Education: Ankara University

Beşir Atalay (pronounced [beʃiɾ ˈataɫaj]; born 1947) is a Turkish politician who was Deputy Prime Minister of Turkey in the government of Recep Tayyip Erdoğan from 2011 to 2014. Previously he was minister of interior from 28 August 2007 to 14 July 2011.

== Early years and academic career ==
Born in Keskin, Kırıkkale Province, he graduated from the Faculty of Law at Ankara University and worked as a lecturer at Atatürk University in Erzurum. He then worked at the State Planning Organization (DPT), Marmara University, and UNESCO's Turkish National Commission. Atalay was the founding rector of the Kırıkkale University until he was removed from office by the Board of Higher Education (YÖK) in the aftermath of the Turkish military memorandum of 1997, on grounds he was involved in activities contrary to the interests of the state.

== Political career ==
In the General Elections of 2002, he was elected a member of the Grand National Assembly of Turkey representing Ankara for the AKP and later he became a minister of state in Erdoğan's first cabinet following President Ahmet Necdet Sezer's veto of a proposal to appoint Atalay as minister of education. Then in August 2007 he was appointed interior minister, one of the few cabinet changes following the re-election of Prime Minister Recep Tayyip Erdoğan that summer, and also following Sezer's retirement from the presidency. In 2009, he was assigned with the task to find a solution to the Turkish Kurdish conflict, a project which lasted until December 2009 and was not supported by the Republican People's Party (CHP) and the Nationalist Movement Party (MHP). In 2011, he was named deputy prime minister with the responsibility of human rights and the fight against terrorism and served in the post until 2014. He was re-elected to the Turkish Parliament in the general elections of November 2015, this time representing the province of Van for the AKP, but did not stand as a candidate in 2018.

== Views ==
In the aftermath of the 2013 Gezi Park protests, Hürriyet Daily News reported that Atalay attributed the unrest to foreign powers and the "Jewish diaspora". His remarks were condemned by Ronald Lauder, president of the World Jewish Congress, who called on Atalay to apologize, saying that they insulted both Jews and Turkish citizens who had participated in the protests. The Turkish Jewish community also issued a statement condemning the remarks, describing them as an unfounded anti-Semitic generalization.

== Personal life ==
Beşir Atalay is married to Yıldız Atalay and has three children. He is a member of the Community of İskenderpaşa, a Turkish sufistic community of Naqshbandi tariqah.

== Notes ==
Political offices
| Preceded by Abdülkadir Aksu | Minister of the Interior; 2007–2011 | Succeeded by İdris Naim Şahin |
| Preceded by Cemil Çiçek | First Deputy Prime Minister of Turkey; 2011–2014 | Succeeded by Numan Kurtulmuş |
