= 1999 Turkish general election =

- 18 April 1999

All 550 seats in the Grand National Assembly 276 seats needed for a majority
- Turnout: 87.09% (▲1.89pp)
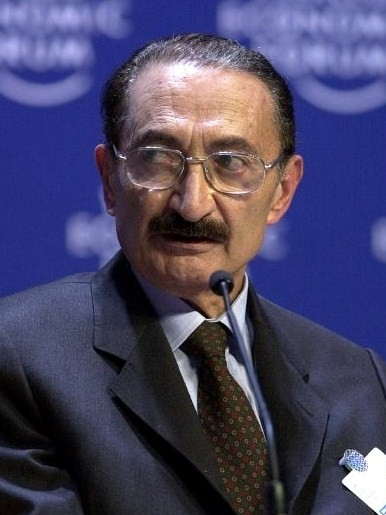

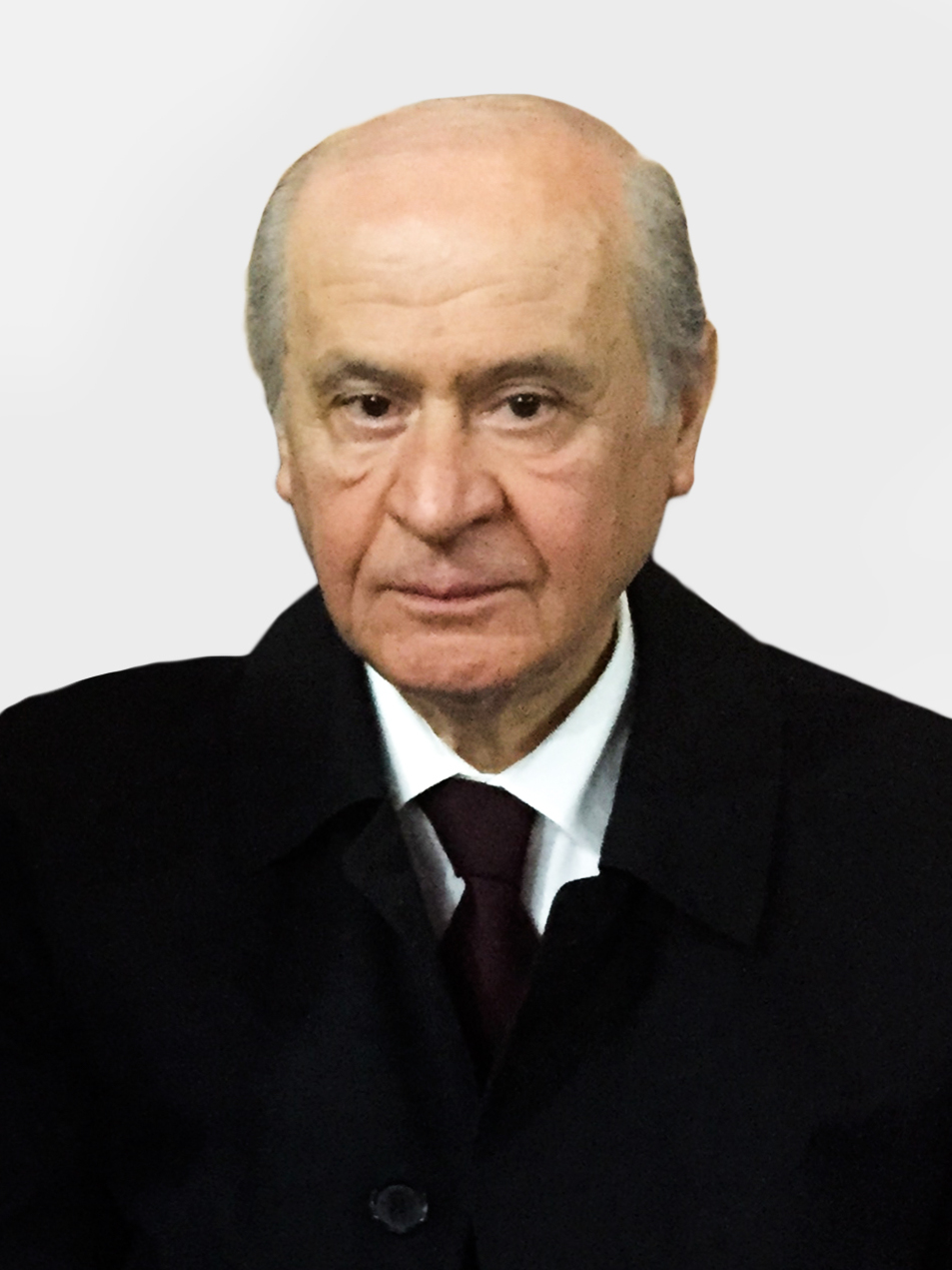

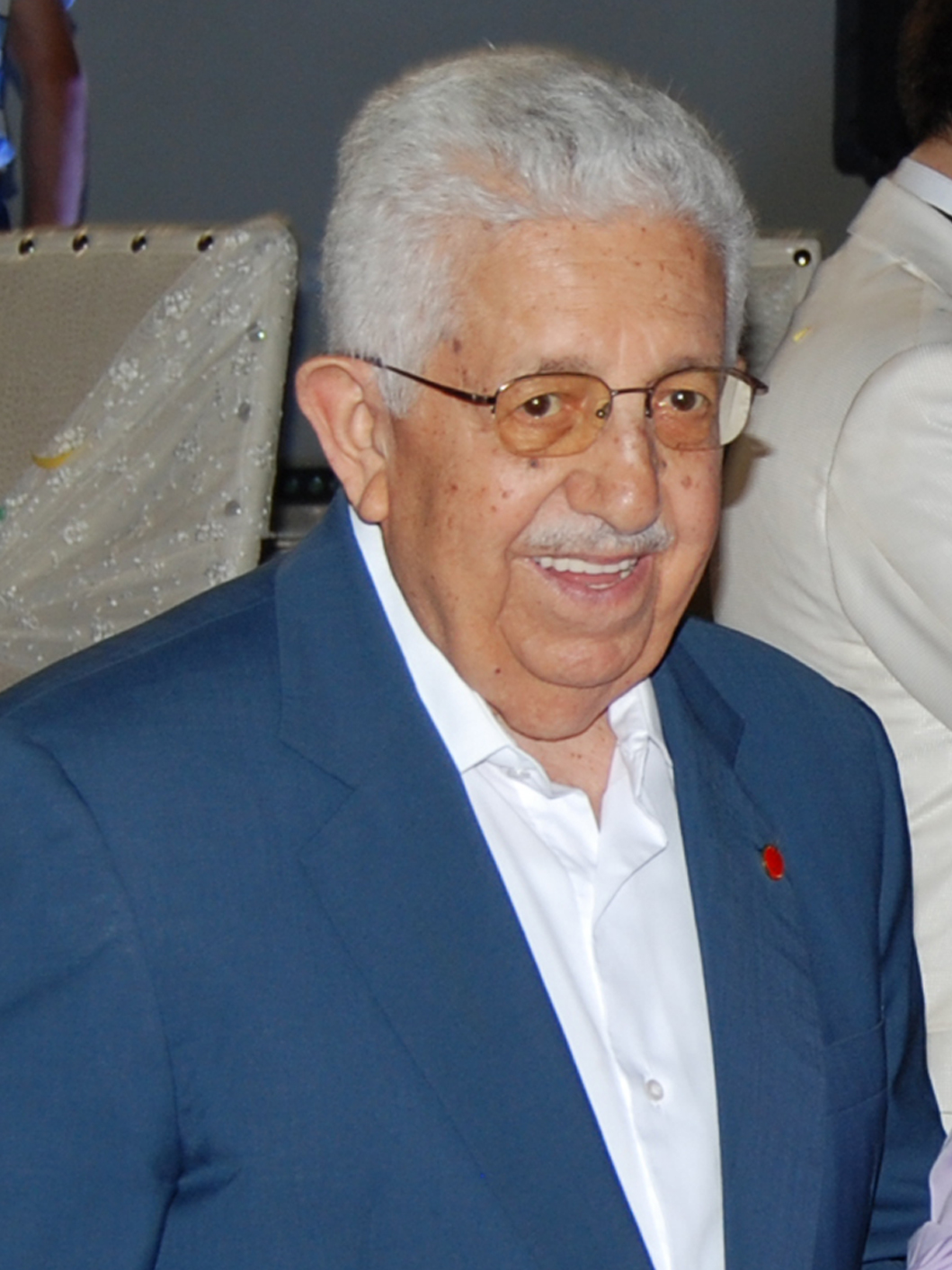

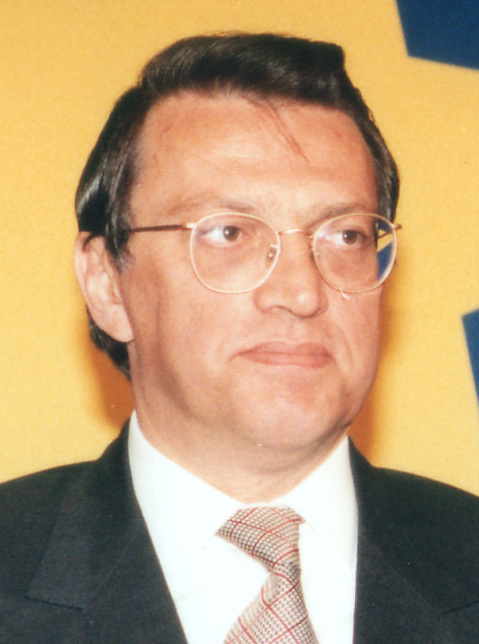

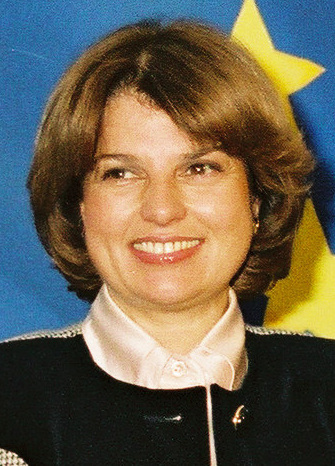
	First party	Second party	Third party
Leader	Bülent Ecevit	Devlet Bahçeli	Recai Kutan
Party	DSP	MHP	FP
Last election	14.64%, 76 seats	8.18%, 0 seats	21.38%, 158 seats (Note: As the Welfare Party; following the Welfare Party's ban by the Constitutional Court, its members founded the Virtue Party.)
Seats won	136	129	111
Seat change	▲60	▲129	▼47
Popular vote	6,919,670	5,606,583	4,805,381
Percentage	22.19%	17.98%	15.41%
Swing	▲7.55pp	▲9.80pp	▼5.97pp
	Fourth party	Fifth party
Leader	Mesut Yılmaz	Tansu Çiller
Party	ANAP	DYP
Last election	19.65%, 132 seats	19.18%, 135 seats
Seats won	86	85
Seat change	▼46	▼50
Popular vote	4,122,929	3,745,417
Percentage	13.22%	12.01%
Swing	▼6.43pp	▼7.17pp
- Results by province
Prime Minister before election
Bülent Ecevit
DSP
Elected Prime Minister
Bülent Ecevit
DSP

General elections were held in Turkey on Sunday, 18 April 1999. For the first time, local, council and parliamentary elections were held on the same day. Bülent Ecevit's Democratic Left Party (DSP), which had been soaring in popularity after the capture of Kurdistan Worker's Party (PKK) leader Abdullah Öcalan, emerged as the biggest party and swept the board in most of Turkey's western provinces. It failed, however, to obtain an overall majority, and did not do nearly as well in the eastern provinces.

The second largest party (dubbed "the second winner" by the press the following day) became the Nationalist Movement Party (MHP), which performed strongly nationwide, producing MPs from nearly all of the country's 81 provinces. The largest party of the last election, the Virtue Party (FP), returned to opposition after shedding forty-seven seats and a million votes. The decline of the Republican People's Party continued; this was the first and the only time in the history of the republic when the party failed to cross the 10 percent threshold for parliamentary representation. This was the last election which produced a hung parliament until the June 2015 general election.

== Background ==
During the 1997 Turkish military memorandum, in case the Welfare Party were to be banned, the Virtue Party was founded in December 1997. The Welfare Party was subsequently banned in January 1998.

== Results ==
Party	Votes	%	Seats	+/–
Democratic Left Party	6,919,670	22.19	136	+60
Nationalist Movement Party	5,606,583	17.98	129	+129
Virtue Party	4,805,381	15.41	111	–47
Motherland Party	4,122,929	13.22	86	–46
True Path Party	3,745,417	12.01	85	–50
Republican People's Party	2,716,094	8.71	0	–49
People's Democracy Party	1,482,196	4.75	0	0
Great Unity Party	456,353	1.46	0	New
Freedom and Solidarity Party	248,553	0.80	0	New
Democrat Turkey Party	179,871	0.58	0	New
Liberal Democratic Party	127,174	0.41	0	New
Democratic Party	92,093	0.30	0	New
Nation Party	79,370	0.25	0	0
Peace Party	78,922	0.25	0	New
Workers' Party	57,607	0.18	0	0
Labour Party	51,756	0.17	0	New
Rebirth Party	44,787	0.14	0	0
Socialist Power Party	37,680	0.12	0	New
Changing Turkey Party	37,175	0.12	0	New
Democracy and Peace Party	24,620	0.08	0	New
Independents	270,265	0.87	3	+3
Total	31,184,496	100.00	550	0
Valid votes	31,184,496	95.49		
Invalid/blank votes	1,471,574	4.51		
Total votes	32,656,070	100.00		
Registered voters/turnout	37,495,217	87.09		
Source: BBC Turkish Service

== Aftermath ==
Bülent Ecevit formed the country's latest coalition government, against the FP, with the second-placed MHP and the fourth-placed Motherland Party (ANAP) as a junior partner. The DYP was consulted during coalition negotiations, but ended up in opposition. The DSP–MHP–ANAP coalition turned out to be one of the most stable in many years, surviving without change until Ecevit's hospitalisation and subsequent refusal to resign in 2002 prompted a wave of resignations from the DSP and early general elections. Five parties in the parliament (DSP, MHP, FP, ANAP and DYP) all failed to gain seats in 2002 elections.
