= 2002 Turkish general election =

- 3 November 2002

All 550 seats in the Grand National Assembly 276 seats needed for a majority
- Turnout: 79.14% (▼7.95pp)
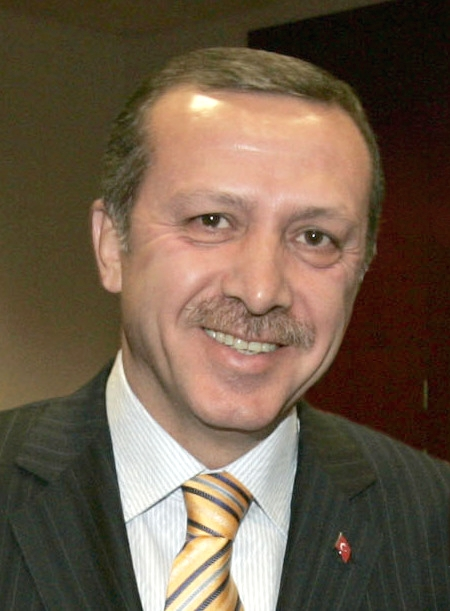

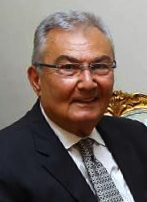
	First party	Second party
Leader	Recep Tayyip Erdoğan	Deniz Baykal
Party	AK Party	CHP
Last election	–	8.71%, 0 seats
Seats won	363	178
Seat change	New	▲178
Popular vote	10,808,229	6,113,352
Percentage	34.28%	19.39%
Swing	New	▲10.68pp
- Results by province
Prime Minister before election
Bülent Ecevit
DSP
Elected Prime Minister
Abdullah Gül
AK Party

General elections were held in Turkey on 3 November 2002 following the collapse of the Democratic Left Party–Nationalist Movement Party–Motherland Party coalition led by Bülent Ecevit. All 550 members of the Grand National Assembly were up for election.

The elections were held during an ongoing economic crisis that followed the 2001 financial crash, which resulted in a deep resentment of coalition governments which had governed the country since the 1980 military coup. The Justice and Development Party (AKP) and Republican People's Party (CHP) between them made massive gains, winning 98.36% of the seats between them. As a result, Turkey moved from the multi-party parliament under a coalition government formed after the 1999 elections to a two-party parliament ruled by an AKP government. No other party won any seats and only nine independents were elected to the parliament.

The AKP, which had only been formed in August 2001 by Recep Tayyip Erdoğan, won the election, securing nearly two-thirds of the seats (363 seats won with 34% of the vote). The only other party to pass the 10% threshold to gain representation in parliament was the CHP, which came second (178 seats secured from 19.38% of the vote). The election produced Turkey's first single party government since 1987 and the country's first two-party parliament since 1961.

The moderate Islamism advocated by the AKP was at odds with the secular establishment of the Republic of Turkey. While serving as the Mayor of Istanbul, Erdoğan had been sentenced to a 10-month prison term in 1998 for reciting a poem in Siirt for which he was accused of inciting racial intolerance. This initially barred him from seeking a seat in parliament, meaning that the AKP's co-founder Abdullah Gül became the first AKP Prime Minister following their election victory. With the help of the CHP, the government overturned Erdoğan's political ban in 2003, after which he was able to seek a seat in a controversial by-election in the Province of Siirt. Erdoğan became Prime Minister in March 2003, with Abdullah Gül assuming the roles of Foreign Minister and Deputy Prime Minister.

== Background ==
The 1999 İzmit earthquake and 1999 Düzce earthquake caused the deaths of over 17,000 people. Following the disaster, the government pledged to implement stricter building regulations and established an "earthquake tax" to enhance readiness in a nation located on two major geological fault lines. Despite these initiatives, the government's slow response to the calamity contributed significantly to the rise of Recep Tayyip Erdoğan's Justice and Development Party (AKP) to power. The AKP promised to restore transparency and rebuild the economy, which had been devastated by a stock market crash. The political party that oversaw the ministry accountable for earthquake relief, as well as the parties that held power for longer and had more control over city administrations in the earthquake-affected region, received greater blame. The newly established AKP benefitted from the votes lost by the ruling parties.

A few days before a match between Fenerbahçe and Malatyaspor, Deputy Prime Minister Mesut Yılmaz was a guest on a TV channel with Can Ataklı. During their conversation, Yılmaz made a statement: "By God's permission, we will make Galatasaray the champion this year too." Before the match, Fenerbahçe fans unfurled a huge banner, reading "We'll see you at the ballot box, Mr. Mesut."

== Endorsements ==
Martin Schulz of the German Social Democratic Party of Germany endorsed the Republican People's Party before the elections. Schulz said: "As social democrats, our aim and desire is for the CHP to emerge victorious from the elections.''

== Results ==
Voting ended in the country's 32 eastern provinces at 15:00, having begun an hour earlier in morning. In the remaining 49 provinces it ended at 16:00. Counting began immediately afterwards.

The Electoral Authority imposed a press blackout on the results until it could ensure that all ballot boxes were secure, but even when it became clear that every box in the country had been sealed, the authority refused to alter its original deadline of 21:00. With early results already being announced by foreign media outlets, Turkish television switched to a live shot of the Electoral Authority headquarters until the blackout was revoked at 19.30.

Party	Votes	%	Seats	+/–
Justice and Development Party	10,808,229	34.28	363	New
Republican People's Party	6,113,352	19.39	178	+178
True Path Party	3,008,942	9.54	0	–85
Nationalist Movement Party	2,635,787	8.36	0	–129
Young Party	2,285,598	7.25	0	New
Democratic People's Party	1,960,660	6.22	0	New
Motherland Party	1,618,465	5.13	0	–86
Felicity Party	785,489	2.49	0	New
Democratic Left Party	384,009	1.22	0	–136
New Turkey Party	363,869	1.15	0	New
Great Unity Party	322,093	1.02	0	0
Homeland Party	294,909	0.94	0	New
Workers' Party	159,843	0.51	0	0
Independent Turkey Party	150,482	0.48	0	New
Freedom and Solidarity Party	106,023	0.34	0	0
Liberal Democratic Party	89,331	0.28	0	0
Nation Party	68,271	0.22	0	0
Communist Party of Turkey	59,180	0.19	0	New
Independents	314,251	1.00	9	+6
Total	31,528,783	100.00	550	0
Valid votes	31,528,783	96.22		
Invalid/blank votes	1,239,378	3.78		
Total votes	32,768,161	100.00		
Registered voters/turnout	41,407,027	79.14		
Source: YSK

== Aftermath ==
=== New government ===
Although the AKP's sweeping victory was clear, Erdoğan could not be appointed prime minister because of his criminal conviction, which had prevented him from standing for parliament. Instead another prominent party member, Abdullah Gül, became prime minister (Cabinet Gül) and remained in the post until a constitutional amendment allowed Erdoğan to stand for a vacant seat in a March 2003 by-election. The AKP taking power may have contributed to the Turkish economic boom of the 2000s.

=== Party leader resignations ===
The result prompted the almost immediate resignations of several prominent Turkish politicians:

- Mesut Yılmaz, former prime minister and leader of the Motherland Party (ANAP) who was succeeded by Ali Talip Özdemir.
- Tansu Çiller, former prime minister and leader of the True Path Party (DYP) who was succeeded by her former interior minister, Mehmet Ağar.
- Devlet Bahçeli, leader of the Nationalist Movement Party (MHP) and junior coalition partner in the outgoing government. His resignation was not accepted by his party's central committee and he remained leader.

Outgoing prime minister Ecevit was widely expected to resign as leader of his DSP but only did so at a party conference in 2004.

== See also ==
- History of Turkey (1946–present)
- Yumak and Sadak v. Turkey
