= 26th Parliament of Turkey =

- 17 November 2015 – 16 May 2018
- Speaker(s): İsmail Kahraman
- MPs: 550
- Election: November 2015
- Status: AKP majority
- Parties (at start) (Composition shown above): AKP (317); CHP (134); HDP (59); MHP (40)

The 26th Parliament of the Turkish Republic was elected in a snap general election held on 1 November 2015 to the Grand National Assembly. It succeeded the short-lived 25th Parliament of Turkey later in November and lasted until July 2018. The 550 members, elected through proportional representation from 85 electoral districts of Turkey, are shown in the table below.

== Members ==
Electoral district	MP	Party
Adana	Ömer Çelik	Justice and Development Party
Adana	Necdet Ünüvar	Justice and Development Party
Adana	Fatma Güldemet Sarı	Justice and Development Party
Adana	Talip Küçükcan	Justice and Development Party
Adana	Mehmet Şükrü Erdinç	Justice and Development Party
Adana	Tamer Dağlı	Justice and Development Party
Adana	Elif Doğan Türkmen	Republican People's Party
Adana	Zülfikar İnönü Tümer	Republican People's Party
Adana	İbrahim Özdiş	Republican People's Party
Adana	Aydın Uslupehlivan	Republican People's Party
Adana	Mevlüt Karakaya	Nationalist Movement Party
Adana	Muharrem Varlı	Nationalist Movement Party
Adana	Seyfettin Yılmaz	Nationalist Movement Party
Adana	Meral Danış Beştaş	Peoples' Democratic Party
Adıyaman	Ahmet Aydın	Justice and Development Party
Adıyaman	Adnan Boynukara	Justice and Development Party
Adıyaman	İbrahim Halil Fırat	Justice and Development Party
Adıyaman	Salih Fırat	Justice and Development Party
Adıyaman	Behçet Yıldırım	Peoples' Democratic Party
Afyonkarahisar	Veysel Eroğlu	Justice and Development Party
Afyonkarahisar	Ali Özkaya	Justice and Development Party
Afyonkarahisar	Hatice Dudu Özkal	Justice and Development Party
Afyonkarahisar	Burcu Köksal	Republican People's Party
Afyonkarahisar	Mehmet Parsak	Nationalist Movement Party
Ağrı	Leyla Zana	Peoples' Democratic Party
Ağrı	Berdan Öztürk	Peoples' Democratic Party
Ağrı	Dirayet Taşdemir	Peoples' Democratic Party
Ağrı	Cesim Gökçe	Justice and Development Party
Aksaray	İlknur İncegöz	Justice and Development Party
Aksaray	Cengiz Aydoğdu	Justice and Development Party
Aksaray	Mustafa Serdengeçti	Justice and Development Party
Amasya	Naci Bostancı	Justice and Development Party
Amasya	Haluk İpek	Justice and Development Party
Amasya	Mustafa Tuncer	Republican People's Party
Ankara (I)	Ali Babacan	Justice and Development Party
Ankara (I)	Yalçın Akdoğan	Justice and Development Party
Ankara (I)	Ahmet Gündoğdu	Justice and Development Party
Ankara (I)	Ali İhsan Arslan	Justice and Development Party
Ankara (I)	Jülide Sarıeroğlu	Justice and Development Party
Ankara (I)	Murat Alparslan	Justice and Development Party
Ankara (I)	Ertan Aydın	Justice and Development Party
Ankara (I)	Fatih Şahin	Justice and Development Party
Ankara (I)	Ayşe Gülsün Bilgehan	Republican People's Party
Ankara (I)	Necati Yılmaz	Republican People's Party
Ankara (I)	Tekin Bingöl	Republican People's Party
Ankara (I)	Aylin Nazlıaka	Republican People's Party
Ankara (I)	Levent Gök	Republican People's Party
Ankara (I)	Ali Haydar Hakverdi	Republican People's Party
Ankara (I)	Bülent Kuşoğlu	Republican People's Party
Ankara (I)	Zühal Topcu	Nationalist Movement Party
Ankara (I)	Erkan Haberal	Nationalist Movement Party
Ankara (I)	Sırrı Süreyya Önder	Peoples' Democratic Party
Ankara (II)	Cemil Çiçek	Justice and Development Party
Ankara (II)	Yıldırım Tuğrul Türkeş	Justice and Development Party
Ankara (II)	Emrullah İşler	Justice and Development Party
Ankara (II)	Ahmet İyimaya	Justice and Development Party
Ankara (II)	Lütfiye Selva Çam	Justice and Development Party
Ankara (II)	Vedat Bilgin	Justice and Development Party
Ankara (II)	Aydın Ünal	Justice and Development Party
Ankara (II)	Nevzat Ceylan	Justice and Development Party
Ankara (II)	Şenal Sarıhan	Republican People's Party
Ankara (II)	Murat Emir	Republican People's Party
Ankara (II)	Ahmet Haluk Koç	Republican People's Party
Ankara (II)	Nihat Yeşil	Republican People's Party
Ankara (II)	Şefkat Çetin	Nationalist Movement Party
Ankara (II)	Mustafa Mit	Nationalist Movement Party
Antalya	Mevlüt Çavuşoğlu	Justice and Development Party
Antalya	Sena Nur Çelik	Justice and Development Party
Antalya	Mustafa Köse	Justice and Development Party
Antalya	İbrahim Aydın	Justice and Development Party
Antalya	Hüseyin Samani	Justice and Development Party
Antalya	Gökcen Özdoğan Enç	Justice and Development Party
Antalya	Atay Uslu	Justice and Development Party
Antalya	Çetin Osman Budak	Republican People's Party
Antalya	Devrim Kök	Republican People's Party
Antalya	Deniz Baykal	Republican People's Party
Antalya	Mustafa Akaydın	Republican People's Party
Antalya	Niyazi Nefi Kara	Republican People's Party
Antalya	Ahmet Selim Yurdakul	Nationalist Movement Party
Antalya	Mehmet Günal	Nationalist Movement Party
Ardahan	Orhan Atalay	Justice and Development Party
Ardahan	Öztürk Yılmaz	Republican People's Party
Artvin	İsrafil Kışla	Justice and Development Party
Artvin	Uğur Bayraktutan	Republican People's Party
Aydın	Bülent Tezcan	Republican People's Party
Aydın	Hüseyin Yıldız	Republican People's Party
Aydın	Metin Lütfi Baydar	Republican People's Party
Aydın	Abdurrahman Öz	Justice and Development Party
Aydın	Mehmet Erdem	Justice and Development Party
Aydın	Mustafa Savaş	Justice and Development Party
Aydın	Deniz Depboylu	Nationalist Movement Party
Balıkesir	Ali Aydınlıoğlu	Justice and Development Party
Balıkesir	Kasım Bostan	Justice and Development Party
Balıkesir	Mahmut Poyrazlı	Justice and Development Party
Balıkesir	Sema Kırcı	Justice and Development Party
Balıkesir	Ahmet Akın	Republican People's Party
Balıkesir	Mehmet Tüm	Republican People's Party
Balıkesir	Namık Havutça	Republican People's Party
Balıkesir	İsmail Ok	Nationalist Movement Party
Bartın	Yılmaz Tunç	Justice and Development Party
Bartın	Muhammet Rıza Yalçınkaya	Republican People's Party
Batman	Ayşe Acar Başaran	Peoples' Democratic Party
Batman	Mehmet Ali Aslan	Peoples' Democratic Party
Batman	Saadet Becerekli	Peoples' Democratic Party
Batman	Ataullah Hamidi	Justice and Development Party
Bayburt	Naci Ağbal	Justice and Development Party
Bayburt	Şahap Kavcıoğlu	Justice and Development Party
Bilecik	Halil Erdemir	Justice and Development Party
Bilecik	Yaşar Tüzün	Republican People's Party
Bingöl	Cevdet Yılmaz	Justice and Development Party
Bingöl	Enver Fehmioğlu	Justice and Development Party
Bingöl	Hişyar Özsoy	Peoples' Democratic Party
Bitlis	Mahmut Celalet Gaydalı	Peoples' Democratic Party
Bitlis	Mizgin Irgat	Peoples' Democratic Party
Bitlis	Vedat Demiröz	Justice and Development Party
Bolu	Ali Ercoşkun	Justice and Development Party
Bolu	Fehmi Küpçü	Justice and Development Party
Bolu	Tanju Özcan	Republican People's Party
Burdur	Reşat Petek	Justice and Development Party
Burdur	Bayram Özçelik	Justice and Development Party
Burdur	Mehmet Göker	Republican People's Party
Bursa	Efkan Ala	Justice and Development Party
Bursa	Mehmet Müezzinoğlu	Justice and Development Party
Bursa	Muhammet Müfit Aydın	Justice and Development Party
Bursa	Bennur Karaburun	Justice and Development Party
Bursa	Cemalettin Kani Torun	Justice and Development Party
Bursa	Osman Mesten	Justice and Development Party
Bursa	Zekeriya Birkan	Justice and Development Party
Bursa	Emine Yavuz Gözgeç	Justice and Development Party
Bursa	Hakan Çavuşoğlu	Justice and Development Party
Bursa	Hüseyin Şahin	Justice and Development Party
Bursa	İsmail Aydın	Justice and Development Party
Bursa	Lale Karabıyık	Republican People's Party
Bursa	Erkan Aydın	Republican People's Party
Bursa	Ceyhun İrgil	Republican People's Party
Bursa	Orhan Sarıbal	Republican People's Party
Bursa	Nurhayat Altaca Kayışoğlu	Republican People's Party
Bursa	İsmet Büyükataman	Nationalist Movement Party
Bursa	Kadir Koçdemir	Nationalist Movement Party
Çanakkale	Ayhan Gider	Justice and Development Party
Çanakkale	Bülent Turan	Justice and Development Party
Çanakkale	Muharrem Erkek	Republican People's Party
Çanakkale	Bülent Öz	Republican People's Party
Çankırı	Hüseyin Filiz	Justice and Development Party
Çankırı	Muhammet Emin Akbaşoğlu	Justice and Development Party
Çorum	Salim Uslu	Justice and Development Party
Çorum	Lütfiye İlksen Ceritoğlu Kurt	Justice and Development Party
Çorum	Ahmet Sami Ceylan	Justice and Development Party
Çorum	Tufan Köse	Republican People's Party
Denizli	Nihat Zeybekci	Justice and Development Party
Denizli	Cahit Özkan	Justice and Development Party
Denizli	Sema Ramazanoğlu	Justice and Development Party
Denizli	Şahin Tin	Justice and Development Party
Denizli	Kazım Arslan	Republican People's Party
Denizli	Melike Basmacı	Republican People's Party
Denizli	Emin Haluk Ayhan	Nationalist Movement Party
Diyarbakır	Altan Tan	Peoples' Democratic Party
Diyarbakır	İdris Baluken	Peoples' Democratic Party
Diyarbakır	İmam Taşçıer	Peoples' Democratic Party
Diyarbakır	Nursel Aydoğan	Peoples' Democratic Party
Diyarbakır	Feleknas Uca	Peoples' Democratic Party
Diyarbakır	Nimetullah Erdoğmuş	Peoples' Democratic Party
Diyarbakır	Çağlar Demirel	Peoples' Democratic Party
Diyarbakır	Sibel Yiğitalp	Peoples' Democratic Party
Diyarbakır	Ziya Pir	Peoples' Democratic Party
Diyarbakır	Mehmet Galip Ensarioğlu	Justice and Development Party
Diyarbakır	Ebubekir Bal	Justice and Development Party
Düzce	Fevai Arslan	Justice and Development Party
Düzce	Faruk Özlü	Justice and Development Party
Düzce	Ayşe Keşir	Justice and Development Party
Edirne	Okan Gaytancıoğlu	Republican People's Party
Edirne	Erdin Bircan	Republican People's Party
Edirne	Rafet Sezen	Justice and Development Party
Elazığ	Ejder Açıkkapı	Justice and Development Party
Elazığ	Metin Bulut	Justice and Development Party
Elazığ	Ömer Serdar	Justice and Development Party
Elazığ	Tahir Öztürk	Justice and Development Party
Erzincan	Sebahattin Karakelle	Justice and Development Party
Erzincan	Serkan Bayram	Justice and Development Party
Erzurum	Recep Akdağ	Justice and Development Party
Erzurum	Orhan Deligöz	Justice and Development Party
Erzurum	Zehra Taşkesenlioğlu	Justice and Development Party
Erzurum	Mustafa Ilıcalı	Justice and Development Party
Erzurum	İbrahim Aydemir	Justice and Development Party
Erzurum	Kamil Aydın	Nationalist Movement Party
Eskişehir	Nabi Avcı	Justice and Development Party
Eskişehir	Harun Karacan	Justice and Development Party
Eskişehir	Emine Nur Günay	Justice and Development Party
Eskişehir	Utku Çakırözer	Republican People's Party
Eskişehir	Nevin Gaye Usluer	Republican People's Party
Eskişehir	Cemal Okan Yüksel	Republican People's Party
Gaziantep	Mehmet Şimşek	Justice and Development Party
Gaziantep	Abdulhamit Gül	Justice and Development Party
Gaziantep	Abdullah Nejat Koçer	Justice and Development Party
Gaziantep	Ahmet Uzer	Justice and Development Party
Gaziantep	Canan Candemir Çelik	Justice and Development Party
Gaziantep	Mehmet Erdoğan	Justice and Development Party
Gaziantep	Abdulkadir Yüksel	Justice and Development Party
Gaziantep	Şamil Tayyar	Justice and Development Party
Gaziantep	Akif Ekici	Republican People's Party
Gaziantep	Mehmet Gökdağ	Republican People's Party
Gaziantep	Ümit Özdağ	Nationalist Movement Party
Gaziantep	Mahmut Toğrul	Peoples' Democratic Party
Giresun	Nurettin Canikli	Justice and Development Party
Giresun	Sabri Öztürk	Justice and Development Party
Giresun	Cemal Öztürk	Justice and Development Party
Giresun	Bülent Yener Bektaşoğlu	Republican People's Party
Gümüşhane	Cihan Pektaş	Justice and Development Party
Gümüşhane	Hacı Osman Akgül	Justice and Development Party
Hakkâri	Abdullah Zeydan	Peoples' Democratic Party
Hakkâri	Selma Irmak	Peoples' Democratic Party
Hakkâri	Nihat Akdoğan	Peoples' Democratic Party
Hatay	Adem Yeşildal	Justice and Development Party
Hatay	Fevzi Şanverdi	Justice and Development Party
Hatay	Hacı Bayram Türkoğlu	Justice and Development Party
Hatay	Mehmet Öntürk	Justice and Development Party
Hatay	Orhan Karasayar	Justice and Development Party
Hatay	Hilmi Yarayıcı	Republican People's Party
Hatay	Mevlüt Dudu	Republican People's Party
Hatay	Serkan Topal	Republican People's Party
Hatay	Birol Ertem	Republican People's Party
Hatay	Mehmet Necmettin Ahrazoğlu	Nationalist Movement Party
Iğdır	Mehmet Emin Adıyaman	Peoples' Democratic Party
Iğdır	Nurettin Araa	Justice and Development Party
Isparta	Süreyya Sadi Bilgiç	Justice and Development Party
Isparta	Sait Yüce	Justice and Development Party
Isparta	İrfan Bakır	Republican People's Party
Isparta	Nuri Okutan	Nationalist Movement Party
İstanbul (I)	İsmail Kahraman	Justice and Development Party
İstanbul (I)	Mustafa Ataş	Justice and Development Party
İstanbul (I)	Mihrimah Belma Satır	Justice and Development Party
İstanbul (I)	Erol Kaya	Justice and Development Party
İstanbul (I)	Ahmet Berat Çonkar	Justice and Development Party
İstanbul (I)	Berat Albayrak	Justice and Development Party
İstanbul (I)	İsmet Uçma	Justice and Development Party
İstanbul (I)	Metin Külünk	Justice and Development Party
İstanbul (I)	Ravza Kavakçı Kan	Justice and Development Party
İstanbul (I)	Azmi Ekinci	Justice and Development Party
İstanbul (I)	Osman Boyraz	Justice and Development Party
İstanbul (I)	Hasan Turan	Justice and Development Party
İstanbul (I)	Hasan Sert	Justice and Development Party
İstanbul (I)	Mehmet Ali Pulcu	Justice and Development Party
İstanbul (I)	Hurşit Yıldırım	Justice and Development Party
İstanbul (I)	Hulusi Şentürk	Justice and Development Party
İstanbul (I)	Şafak Pavey	Republican People's Party
İstanbul (I)	Gamze Akkuş İlgezdi	Republican People's Party
İstanbul (I)	Gürsel Tekin	Republican People's Party
İstanbul (I)	Barış Yarkadaş	Republican People's Party
İstanbul (I)	Mehmet Akif Hamzaçebi	Republican People's Party
İstanbul (I)	Mahmut Tanal	Republican People's Party
İstanbul (I)	İlhan Kesici	Republican People's Party
İstanbul (I)	Oğuz Kaan Salıcı	Republican People's Party
İstanbul (I)	Onursal Adıgüzel	Republican People's Party
İstanbul (I)	Ali Özcan	Republican People's Party
İstanbul (I)	Yakup Akkaya	Republican People's Party
İstanbul (I)	Selahattin Demirtaş	Peoples' Democratic Party
İstanbul (I)	Hüda Kaya	Peoples' Democratic Party
İstanbul (I)	Edip Semih Yalçın	Nationalist Movement Party
İstanbul (I)	İzzet Ulvi Yönter	Nationalist Movement Party
İstanbul (II)	Hayati Yazıcı	Justice and Development Party
İstanbul (II)	Volkan Bozkır	Justice and Development Party
İstanbul (II)	Burhan Kuzu	Justice and Development Party
İstanbul (II)	Ayşe Nur Bahçekapılı	Justice and Development Party
İstanbul (II)	Fatma Betül Sayan Kaya	Justice and Development Party
İstanbul (II)	Ekrem Erdem	Justice and Development Party
İstanbul (II)	Aziz Babuşcu	Justice and Development Party
İstanbul (II)	Durmuş Ali Sarıkaya	Justice and Development Party
İstanbul (II)	Şirin Ünal	Justice and Development Party
İstanbul (II)	Fatma Benli	Justice and Development Party
İstanbul (II)	Hüseyin Bürge	Justice and Development Party
İstanbul (II)	Haydar Ali Yıldız	Justice and Development Party
İstanbul (II)	Ahmet Hamdi Çamlı	Justice and Development Party
İstanbul (II)	Markar Eseyan	Justice and Development Party
İstanbul (II)	Selina Doğan	Republican People's Party
İstanbul (II)	Aykut Erdoğdu	Republican People's Party
İstanbul (II)	Mustafa Sezgin Tanrıkulu	Republican People's Party
İstanbul (II)	Dursun Çiçek	Republican People's Party
İstanbul (II)	Süleyman Sencer Ayata	Republican People's Party
İstanbul (II)	Gülay Yedekci	Republican People's Party
İstanbul (II)	Kadri Enis Berberoğlu	Republican People's Party
İstanbul (II)	Didem Engin	Republican People's Party
İstanbul (II)	Celal Doğan	Peoples' Democratic Party
İstanbul (II)	Filiz Kerestecioğlu	Peoples' Democratic Party
İstanbul (II)	Ekmeleddin İhsanoğlu	Nationalist Movement Party
İstanbul (II)	Celal Adan	Nationalist Movement Party
İstanbul (III)	Mehmet Mehdi Eker	Justice and Development Party
İstanbul (III)	Mustafa Şentop	Justice and Development Party
İstanbul (III)	Mehmet Doğan Kubat	Justice and Development Party
İstanbul (III)	Serap Yaşar	Justice and Development Party
İstanbul (III)	Feyzullah Kıyıklık	Justice and Development Party
İstanbul (III)	Mehmet Muş	Justice and Development Party
İstanbul (III)	Nureddin Nebati	Justice and Development Party
İstanbul (III)	Mehmet Metiner	Justice and Development Party
İstanbul (III)	Harun Karaca	Justice and Development Party
İstanbul (III)	Tülay Kaynarca	Justice and Development Party
İstanbul (III)	Mustafa Yeneroğlu	Justice and Development Party
İstanbul (III)	Erkan Kandemir	Justice and Development Party
İstanbul (III)	Halis Dalkılıç	Justice and Development Party
İstanbul (III)	Mürteza Zengin	Justice and Development Party
İstanbul (III)	Yıldız Seferinoğlu	Justice and Development Party
İstanbul (III)	Abdullah Başcı	Justice and Development Party
İstanbul (III)	Bihlun Tamaylıgil	Republican People's Party
İstanbul (III)	İlhan Cihaner	Republican People's Party
İstanbul (III)	Engin Altay	Republican People's Party
İstanbul (III)	Ali Şeker	Republican People's Party
İstanbul (III)	Erdoğan Toprak	Republican People's Party
İstanbul (III)	Eren Erdem	Republican People's Party
İstanbul (III)	Mehmet Bekaroğlu	Republican People's Party
İstanbul (III)	Zeynel Emre	Republican People's Party
İstanbul (III)	Sibel Özdemir	Republican People's Party
İstanbul (III)	Pervin Buldan	Peoples' Democratic Party
İstanbul (III)	Garo Paylan	Peoples' Democratic Party
İstanbul (III)	Erdal Ataş	Peoples' Democratic Party
İstanbul (III)	Atila Kaya	Nationalist Movement Party
İstanbul (III)	İsmail Faruk Aksu	Nationalist Movement Party
İstanbul (III)	Arzu Erdem	Nationalist Movement Party
İzmir (I)	Selin Sayek Böke	Republican People's Party
İzmir (I)	Musa Çam	Republican People's Party
İzmir (I)	Tuncay Özkan	Republican People's Party
İzmir (I)	Tacettin Bayır	Republican People's Party
İzmir (I)	Özcan Purçu	Republican People's Party
İzmir (I)	Ali Yiğit	Republican People's Party
İzmir (I)	Murat Bakan	Republican People's Party
İzmir (I)	Binali Yıldırım	Justice and Development Party
İzmir (I)	Mahmut Atilla Kaya	Justice and Development Party
İzmir (I)	Hüseyin Kocabıyık	Justice and Development Party
İzmir (I)	Necip Kalkan	Justice and Development Party
İzmir (I)	Oktay Vural	Nationalist Movement Party
İzmir (I)	Ertuğrul Kürkçü	Peoples' Democratic Party
İzmir (II)	Kemal Kılıçdaroğlu	Republican People's Party
İzmir (II)	Zeynep Altıok	Republican People's Party
İzmir (II)	Zekeriya Temizel	Republican People's Party
İzmir (II)	Mustafa Balbay	Republican People's Party
İzmir (II)	Aytun Çıray	Republican People's Party
İzmir (II)	Atilla Sertel	Republican People's Party
İzmir (II)	Kamil Okyay Sındır	Republican People's Party
İzmir (II)	Fatma Seniha Nükhet Hotar	Justice and Development Party
İzmir (II)	İbrahim Mustafa Turhan	Justice and Development Party
İzmir (II)	Hamza Dağ	Justice and Development Party
İzmir (II)	Kerem Ali Sürekli	Justice and Development Party
İzmir (II)	Ahmet Kenan Tanrıkulu	Nationalist Movement Party
İzmir (II)	Müslüm Doğan	Peoples' Democratic Party
Kahramanmaraş	Mahir Ünal	Justice and Development Party
Kahramanmaraş	Celalettin Güvenç	Justice and Development Party
Kahramanmaraş	İmran Kılıç	Justice and Development Party
Kahramanmaraş	Mehmet İlker Çitil	Justice and Development Party
Kahramanmaraş	Mehmet Uğur Dilipak	Justice and Development Party
Kahramanmaraş	Nursel Reyhanoğlu	Justice and Development Party
Kahramanmaraş	Veysi Kaynak	Justice and Development Party
Kahramanmaraş	Fahrettin Oğuz Tor	Nationalist Movement Party
Karabük	Mehmet Ali Şahin	Justice and Development Party
Karabük	Burhanettin Uysal	Justice and Development Party
Karaman	Recep Konuk	Justice and Development Party
Karaman	Recep Şeker	Justice and Development Party
Kars	Ahmet Arslan	Justice and Development Party
Kars	Yusuf Selahattin Beyribey	Justice and Development Party
Kars	Ayhan Bilgen	Peoples' Democratic Party
Kastamonu	Hakkı Köylü	Justice and Development Party
Kastamonu	Metin Çelik	Justice and Development Party
Kastamonu	Murat Demir	Justice and Development Party
Kayseri	Taner Yıldız	Justice and Development Party
Kayseri	Mehmet Özhaseki	Justice and Development Party
Kayseri	Mustafa Elitaş	Justice and Development Party
Kayseri	İsmail Emrah Karayel	Justice and Development Party
Kayseri	Hülya Nergis	Justice and Development Party
Kayseri	İsmail Tamer	Justice and Development Party
Kayseri	Sami Dedeoğlu	Justice and Development Party
Kayseri	Yusuf Halaçoğlu	Nationalist Movement Party
Kayseri	Çetin Arık	Republican People's Party
Kırıkkale	Abdullah Öztürk	Justice and Development Party
Kırıkkale	Mehmet Demir	Justice and Development Party
Kırıkkale	Ramazan Can	Justice and Development Party
Kırşehir	Mikail Arslan	Justice and Development Party
Kırşehir	Salih Çetinkaya	Justice and Development Party
Kırklareli	Türabi Kayan	Republican People's Party
Kırklareli	Vecdi Gündoğdu	Republican People's Party
Kırklareli	Selahattin Minsolmaz	Justice and Development Party
Kilis	Mustafa Hilmi Dülger	Justice and Development Party
Kilis	Reşit Polat	Justice and Development Party
Kocaeli	Fikri Işık	Justice and Development Party
Kocaeli	Cemil Yaman	Justice and Development Party
Kocaeli	İlyas Şeker	Justice and Development Party
Kocaeli	Mehmet Akif Yılmaz	Justice and Development Party
Kocaeli	Radiye Sezer Katırcıoğlu	Justice and Development Party
Kocaeli	Sami Çakır	Justice and Development Party
Kocaeli	Zeki Aygün	Justice and Development Party
Kocaeli	Haydar Akar	Republican People's Party
Kocaeli	Fatma Kaplan Hürriyet	Republican People's Party
Kocaeli	Tahsin Tarhan	Republican People's Party
Kocaeli	Saffet Sancaklı	Nationalist Movement Party
Konya	Ahmet Davutoğlu	Justice and Development Party
Konya	Mustafa Baloğlu	Justice and Development Party
Konya	Halil Etyemez	Justice and Development Party
Konya	Abdullah Ağralı	Justice and Development Party
Konya	Ahmet Sorgun	Justice and Development Party
Konya	Ömer Ünal	Justice and Development Party
Konya	Ziya Altunyaldız	Justice and Development Party
Konya	Hacı Ahmet Özdemir	Justice and Development Party
Konya	Hüsnüye Erdoğan	Justice and Development Party
Konya	Leyla Şahin Usta	Justice and Development Party
Konya	Mehmet Babaoğlu	Justice and Development Party
Konya	Muhammet Uğur Kaleli	Justice and Development Party
Konya	Mustafa Kalaycı	Nationalist Movement Party
Konya	Mustafa Hüsnü Bozkurt	Republican People's Party
Kütahya	Ahmet Tan	Justice and Development Party
Kütahya	İshak Gazel	Justice and Development Party
Kütahya	Mustafa Şükrü Nazlı	Justice and Development Party
Kütahya	Vural Kavuncu	Justice and Development Party
Malatya	Taha Özhan	Justice and Development Party
Malatya	Öznur Çalık	Justice and Development Party
Malatya	Nurettin Yaşar	Justice and Development Party
Malatya	Bülent Tüfenkci	Justice and Development Party
Malatya	Mustafa Şahin	Justice and Development Party
Malatya	Veli Ağbaba	Republican People's Party
Manisa	Recai Berber	Justice and Development Party
Manisa	Selçuk Özdağ	Justice and Development Party
Manisa	Uğur Aydemir	Justice and Development Party
Manisa	İsmail Bilen	Justice and Development Party
Manisa	Murat Baybatur	Justice and Development Party
Manisa	Özgür Özel	Republican People's Party
Manisa	Tur Yıldız Biçer	Republican People's Party
Manisa	Mazlum Nurlu	Republican People's Party
Manisa	Erkan Akçay	Nationalist Movement Party
Mardin	Mithat Sancar	Peoples' Democratic Party
Mardin	Erol Dora	Peoples' Democratic Party
Mardin	Gülser Yıldırım	Peoples' Democratic Party
Mardin	Ali Atalan	Peoples' Democratic Party
Mardin	Orhan Miroğlu	Justice and Development Party
Mardin	Ceyda Bölünmez Çankırı	Justice and Development Party
Mersin	Lütfi Elvan	Justice and Development Party
Mersin	Yılmaz Tezcan	Justice and Development Party
Mersin	Hacı Özkan	Justice and Development Party
Mersin	Ali Cumhur Taşkın	Justice and Development Party
Mersin	Fikri Sağlar	Republican People's Party
Mersin	Aytuğ Atıcı	Republican People's Party
Mersin	Serdal Kuyucuoğlu	Republican People's Party
Mersin	Hüseyin Çamak	Republican People's Party
Mersin	Oktay Öztürk	Nationalist Movement Party
Mersin	Baki Şimşek	Nationalist Movement Party
Mersin	Dengir Mir Mehmet Fırat	Peoples' Democratic Party
Muğla	Nurettin Demir	Republican People's Party
Muğla	Ömer Süha Aldan	Republican People's Party
Muğla	Akın Üstündağ	Republican People's Party
Muğla	Nihat Öztürk	Justice and Development Party
Muğla	Hasan Özyer	Justice and Development Party
Muğla	Mehmet Erdoğan	Nationalist Movement Party
Muş	Ahmet Yıldırım	Peoples' Democratic Party
Muş	Burcu Çelik Özkan	Peoples' Democratic Party
Muş	Mehmet Emin Şimşek	Justice and Development Party
Nevşehir	Ebubekir Gizligider	Justice and Development Party
Nevşehir	Murat Göktürk	Justice and Development Party
Nevşehir	Mustafa Açıkgöz	Justice and Development Party
Niğde	Alpaslan Kavaklıoğlu	Justice and Development Party
Niğde	Erdoğan Özegen	Justice and Development Party
Niğde	Ömer Fethi Gürer	Republican People's Party
Ordu	Numan Kurtulmuş	Justice and Development Party
Ordu	Metin Gündoğdu	Justice and Development Party
Ordu	Ergün Taşcı	Justice and Development Party
Ordu	Oktay Çanak	Justice and Development Party
Ordu	Seyit Torun	Republican People's Party
Osmaniye	Mücahit Durmuşoğlu	Justice and Development Party
Osmaniye	Suat Önal	Justice and Development Party
Osmaniye	Devlet Bahçeli	Nationalist Movement Party
Osmaniye	Ruhi Ersoy	Nationalist Movement Party
Rize	Hasan Karal	Justice and Development Party
Rize	Hikmet Ayar	Justice and Development Party
Rize	Osman Aşkın Bak	Justice and Development Party
Sakarya	Mustafa İsen	Justice and Development Party
Sakarya	Ayhan Sefer Üstün	Justice and Development Party
Sakarya	Ali İhsan Yavuz	Justice and Development Party
Sakarya	Recep Uncuoğlu	Justice and Development Party
Sakarya	Şaban Dişli	Justice and Development Party
Sakarya	Engin Özkoç	Republican People's Party
Sakarya	Zihni Açba	Nationalist Movement Party
Samsun	Akif Çağatay Kılıç	Justice and Development Party
Samsun	Ahmet Demircan	Justice and Development Party
Samsun	Hasan Basri Kurt	Justice and Development Party
Samsun	Çiğdem Karaarslan	Justice and Development Party
Samsun	Fuat Köktaş	Justice and Development Party
Samsun	Orhan Kırcalı	Justice and Development Party
Samsun	Hayati Tekin	Republican People's Party
Samsun	Kemal Zeybek	Republican People's Party
Samsun	Erhan Usta	Nationalist Movement Party
Siirt	Besime Konca	Peoples' Democratic Party
Siirt	Kadri Yıldırım	Peoples' Democratic Party
Siirt	Yasin Aktay	Justice and Development Party
Sinop	Nazım Maviş	Justice and Development Party
Sinop	Barış Karadeniz	Republican People's Party
Sivas	İsmet Yılmaz	Justice and Development Party
Sivas	Habip Soluk	Justice and Development Party
Sivas	Selim Dursun	Justice and Development Party
Sivas	Hilmi Bilgin	Justice and Development Party
Sivas	Ali Akyıldız	Republican People's Party
Şanlıurfa	Faruk Çelik	Justice and Development Party
Şanlıurfa	Halil Özcan	Justice and Development Party
Şanlıurfa	Ahmet Eşref Fakıbaba	Justice and Development Party
Şanlıurfa	İbrahim Halil Yıldız	Justice and Development Party
Şanlıurfa	Kemalettin Yılmaztekin	Justice and Development Party
Şanlıurfa	Mahmut Kaçar	Justice and Development Party
Şanlıurfa	Mehmet Akyürek	Justice and Development Party
Şanlıurfa	Mehmet Ali Cevheri	Justice and Development Party
Şanlıurfa	Mehmet Kasım Gülpınar	Justice and Development Party
Şanlıurfa	Osman Baydemir	Peoples' Democratic Party
Şanlıurfa	İbrahim Ayhan	Peoples' Democratic Party
Şanlıurfa	Dilek Öcalan	Peoples' Democratic Party
Şırnak	Faysal Sarıyıldız	Peoples' Democratic Party
Şırnak	Ferhat Encü	Peoples' Democratic Party
Şırnak	Leyla Birlik	Peoples' Democratic Party
Şırnak	Aycan İrmez	Peoples' Democratic Party
Tekirdağ	Faik Öztrak	Republican People's Party
Tekirdağ	Candan Yüceer	Republican People's Party
Tekirdağ	Emre Köprülü	Republican People's Party
Tekirdağ	Mustafa Yel	Justice and Development Party
Tekirdağ	Ayşe Doğan	Justice and Development Party
Tekirdağ	Metin Akgün	Justice and Development Party
Tokat	Zeyid Aslan	Justice and Development Party
Tokat	Celil Göçer	Justice and Development Party
Tokat	Coşkun Çakır	Justice and Development Party
Tokat	Yusuf Beyazıt	Justice and Development Party
Tokat	Kadim Durmaz	Republican People's Party
Trabzon	Süleyman Soylu	Justice and Development Party
Trabzon	Salih Cora	Justice and Development Party
Trabzon	Muhammet Balta	Justice and Development Party
Trabzon	Adnan Günnar	Justice and Development Party
Trabzon	Ayşe Sula Köseoğlu	Justice and Development Party
Trabzon	Haluk Pekşen	Republican People's Party
Tunceli	Alican Önlü	Peoples' Democratic Party
Tunceli	Gürsel Erol	Republican People's Party
Uşak	Alim Tunç	Justice and Development Party
Uşak	Mehmet Altay	Justice and Development Party
Uşak	Özkan Yalım	Republican People's Party
Van	Figen Yüksekdağ	Peoples' Democratic Party
Van	Lezgin Botan	Peoples' Democratic Party
Van	Nadir Yıldırım	Peoples' Democratic Party
Van	Adem Geveri	Peoples' Democratic Party
Van	Bedia Özgökçe Ertan	Peoples' Democratic Party
Van	Tuğba Hezer Öztürk	Peoples' Democratic Party
Van	Beşir Atalay	Justice and Development Party
Van	Burhan Kayatürk	Justice and Development Party
Yalova	Fikri Demirel	Justice and Development Party
Yalova	Muharrem İnce	Republican People's Party
Yozgat	Bekir Bozdağ	Justice and Development Party
Yozgat	Abdülkadir Akgül	Justice and Development Party
Yozgat	Ertuğrul Soysal	Justice and Development Party
Yozgat	Yusuf Başer	Justice and Development Party
Zonguldak	Faruk Çaturoğlu	Justice and Development Party
Zonguldak	Hüseyin Özbakır	Justice and Development Party
Zonguldak	Özcan Ulupınar	Justice and Development Party
Zonguldak	Şerafettin Turpcu	Republican People's Party
Zonguldak	Ünal Demirtaş	Republican People's Party
