= 25th Parliament of Turkey =

2015 Turkish parliament

- 23 June 2015 – 1 November 2015
- Speaker(s): İsmet Yılmaz
- Deputy Speakers: Naci Bostancı; Şafak Pavey; Koray Aydın; Yurdusev Özsökmenler
- MPs: 550
- Election: June 2015
- Status: Hung parliament
- Parties (at start) (Composition shown above): AKP (258); CHP (132); MHP (80); HDP (80)
- Parties (current): AKP (258); CHP (131); HDP (80); MHP (79); Independents (2)
- Prime Ministers: Ahmet Davutoğlu
- Government(s): 62nd, 63rd

This is a list of members of Parliament (MPs) elected to the Grand National Assembly for the 25th Parliament of the Republic of Turkey at the June 2015 general election, which was held on 7 June 2015.

Electoral districts are ordered in alphabetical order, and parties within the electoral districts are ordered according their ranking within that district. Within the parties, MPs are ordered according to their orders in the party lists.

The list shows the parties from which they were elected, not subsequent changes. It also does not show the vacated seats.

Party	Members	Change	Proportion
Justice and Development Party	258	▼53	46.9%
Republican People's Party	132	▲7	24.00%
Nationalist Movement Party	80	▲29	14.55%
Peoples' Democratic Party	80	▲50	14.55%
Total	550		100%

== Adana ==
Party	Member
AKP	5 / 14
CHP	4 / 14
MHP	3 / 14
HDP	2 / 14

Member	Party
Necdet Ünüvar	Justice and Development Party
Fatma Güldemet Sarı	Justice and Development Party
Sadullah Kısacık	Justice and Development Party
Talip Küçükcan	Justice and Development Party
Mehmet Şükrü Erdinç	Justice and Development Party
Elif Doğan Türkmen	Republican People's Party
Zülfikar İnönü Tümer	Republican People's Party
İbrahim Özdiş	Republican People's Party
Aydın Uslupehlivan	Republican People's Party
Mevlüt Karakaya	Nationalist Movement Party
Muharrem Varlı	Nationalist Movement Party
Seyfettin Yılmaz	Nationalist Movement Party
Rıdvan Turan	Peoples' Democratic Party
Meral Danış Beştaş	Peoples' Democratic Party

== Adıyaman ==
Party	Member
AKP	4 / 5
HDP	1 / 5
CHP	0 / 5
MHP	0 / 5

Member	Party
Ahmet Aydın	Justice and Development Party
Adnan Boynukara	Justice and Development Party
İbrahim Halil Fırat	Justice and Development Party
Salih Fırat	Justice and Development Party
Behçet Yıldırım	Peoples' Democratic Party

== Afyonkarahisar ==
Party	Member
AKP	3 / 5
MHP	1 / 5
CHP	1 / 5
HDP	0 / 5

Member	Party
Halil Ürün	Justice and Development Party
Ali Özkaya	Justice and Development Party
Remziye Sıvacı	Justice and Development Party
Mehmet Parsak	Nationalist Movement Party
Burcu Kayıkcı	Republican People's Party

== Ağrı ==
Party	Member
HDP	4 / 4
AKP	0 / 4
MHP	0 / 4
CHP	0 / 4

Member	Party
Leyla Zana	Peoples' Democratic Party
Berdan Öztürk	Peoples' Democratic Party
Dirayet Taşdemir	Peoples' Democratic Party
Mehmet Emin İlhan	Peoples' Democratic Party

== Aksaray ==
Party	Member
AKP	2 / 3
MHP	1 / 3
CHP	0 / 3
HDP	0 / 3

Member	Party
İlknur İnceöz	Justice and Development Party
Nevzat Palta	Justice and Development Party
Turan Yaldır	Nationalist Movement Party

== Amasya ==
Party	Member
AKP	2 / 3
CHP	1 / 3
MHP	0 / 3
HDP	0 / 3

Member	Party
Naci Bostancı	Justice and Development Party
Sait Yüce	Justice and Development Party
Mustafa Tuncer	Republican People's Party

== Ankara ==
=== 1st electoral district ===
Party	Member
AKP	7 / 18
CHP	7 / 18
MHP	3 / 18
HDP	1 / 18

Member	Party
Yalçın Akdoğan	Justice and Development Party
Ahmet Gündoğdu	Justice and Development Party
Ali İhsan Arslan	Justice and Development Party
Jülide Sarıeroğlu	Justice and Development Party
Murat Alparslan	Justice and Development Party
Ertan Aydın	Justice and Development Party
Tülay Selamoğlu	Justice and Development Party
Ayşe Gülsün Bilgehan	Republican People's Party
Necati Yılmaz	Republican People's Party
Tekin Bingöl	Republican People's Party
Aylin Nazlıaka	Republican People's Party
Levent Gök	Republican People's Party
Ali Haydar Hakverdi	Republican People's Party
Bülent Kuşoğlu	Republican People's Party
Yıldırım Tuğrul Türkeş	Nationalist Movement Party
Zühal Topcu	Nationalist Movement Party
Mustafa Erdem	Nationalist Movement Party
Sırrı Süreyya Önder	Peoples' Democratic Party

=== 2nd electoral district ===
Party	Member
AKP	8 / 14
CHP	4 / 14
MHP	2 / 14
HDP	0 / 14

Member	Party
Emrullah İşler	Justice and Development Party
Ahmet İyimaya	Justice and Development Party
Lütfiye Selva Çam	Justice and Development Party
Vedat Bilgin	Justice and Development Party
Aydın Ünal	Justice and Development Party
Ayhan Yılmaz	Justice and Development Party
Mahmut Sami Mallı	Justice and Development Party
Nevzat Ceylan	Justice and Development Party
Şenal Sarıhan	Republican People's Party
Murat Emir	Republican People's Party
Ahmet Haluk Koç	Republican People's Party
Nihat Yeşil	Republican People's Party
Şefkat Çetin	Nationalist Movement Party
Mustafa Mit	Nationalist Movement Party

== Antalya ==
Party	Member
AKP	5 / 14
CHP	5 / 14
MHP	3 / 14
HDP	1 / 14

Member	Party
Lütfi Elvan	Justice and Development Party
Mustafa Köse	Justice and Development Party
Hüseyin Samani	Justice and Development Party
Gökcen Özdoğan Enç	Justice and Development Party
Sena Nur Çelik	Justice and Development Party
Niyazi Nefi Kara	Republican People's Party
Deniz Baykal	Republican People's Party
Çetin Osman Budak	Republican People's Party
Mustafa Akaydın	Republican People's Party
Devrim Kök	Republican People's Party
Mehmet Günal	Nationalist Movement Party
Ahmet Selim Yurdakul	Nationalist Movement Party
Tarkan Akıllı	Nationalist Movement Party
Hakkı Saruhan Oluç	Peoples' Democratic Party

== Ardahan ==
Party	Member
HDP	1 / 2
AKP	1 / 2
CHP	0 / 2
MHP	0 / 2

Member	Party
Taşkın Aktaş	Peoples' Democratic Party
Orhan Atalay	Justice and Development Party

== Artvin ==
Party	Member
AKP	1 / 2
CHP	1 / 2
MHP	0 / 2
HDP	0 / 2

Member	Party
İsrafil Kışla	Justice and Development Party
Uğur Bayraktutan	Republican People's Party

== Aydın ==
Party	Member
CHP	4 / 7
AKP	2 / 7
MHP	1 / 7
HDP	0 / 7

Member	Party
Bülent Tezcan	Republican People's Party
Metin Lütfi Baydar	Republican People's Party
Hüseyin Yıldız	Republican People's Party
Mehmet Fatih Atay	Republican People's Party
Mehmet Sadık Atay	Justice and Development Party
Abdurrahman Öz	Justice and Development Party
Ali Uzunırmak	Nationalist Movement Party

== Balıkesir ==
Party	Member
AKP	3 / 8
CHP	3 / 8
MHP	2 / 8
HDP	0 / 8

Member	Party
Mahmut Poyrazlı	Justice and Development Party
Sema Kırcı	Justice and Development Party
Ali Aydınlıoğlu	Justice and Development Party
Mehmet Tüm	Republican People's Party
Ahmet Akın	Republican People's Party
Namık Havutça	Republican People's Party
İsmail Ok	Nationalist Movement Party
Recep Çetin	Nationalist Movement Party

== Bartın ==
Party	Member
AKP	1 / 2
CHP	1 / 2
MHP	0 / 2
HDP	0 / 2

Member	Party
Yılmaz Tunç	Justice and Development Party
Muhammet Rıza Yalçınkaya	Republican People's Party

== Batman ==
Party	Member
HDP	3 / 4
AKP	1 / 4
MHP	0 / 4
CHP	0 / 4

Member	Party
Ali Atalan	Peoples' Democratic Party
Saadet Becerikli	Peoples' Democratic Party
Ayşe Acar Başaran	Peoples' Democratic Party
Ziver Özdemir	Justice and Development Party

== Bayburt ==
Party	Member
AKP	1 / 2
MHP	1 / 2
CHP	0 / 2
HDP	0 / 2

Member	Party
Naci Ağbal	Justice and Development Party
Karabey Kadri Karaoğlu	Nationalist Movement Party

== Bilecik ==
Party	Member
AKP	1 / 2
CHP	1 / 2
MHP	0 / 2
HDP	0 / 2

Member	Party
Halil Erdemir	Justice and Development Party
Yaşar Tüzün	Republican People's Party

== Bingöl ==
Party	Member
AKP	2 / 3
HDP	1 / 3
MHP	0 / 3
CHP	0 / 3

Member	Party
Şebnem Koçakelçi	Justice and Development Party
Enver Fehmioğlu	Justice and Development Party
Hişyar Özsoy	Peoples' Democratic Party

== Bitlis ==
Party	Member
HDP	2 / 3
AKP	1 / 3
MHP	0 / 3
CHP	0 / 3

Member	Party
Mizgin Irgat	Peoples' Democratic Party
Mahmut Celadet Gaydalı	Peoples' Democratic Party
Vedat Demiröz	Justice and Development Party

== Bolu ==
Party	Member
AKP	2 / 3
CHP	1 / 3
MHP	0 / 3
HDP	0 / 3

Member	Party
Ali Ercoşkun	Justice and Development Party
Fehmi Küpçü	Justice and Development Party
Tanju Özcan	Republican People's Party

== Burdur ==
Party	Member
AKP	1 / 3
CHP	1 / 3
MHP	1 / 3
HDP	0 / 3

Member	Party
Reşat Petek	Justice and Development Party
Mehmet Göker	Republican People's Party
Alparslan Ahmet Dursun	Nationalist Movement Party

== Bursa ==
Party	Member
AKP	9 / 18
CHP	5 / 18
MHP	3 / 18
HDP	1 / 18

Member	Party
Mehmet Müezzinoğlu	Justice and Development Party
Emine Yavuz Gözgeç	Justice and Development Party
Cemalettin Kani Torun	Justice and Development Party
Hüseyin Şahin	Justice and Development Party
İsmet Su	Justice and Development Party
Hakan Çavuşoğlu	Justice and Development Party
Önder Matlı	Justice and Development Party
Zekeriya Birkan	Justice and Development Party
Bennur Karaburun	Justice and Development Party
Lale Karabıyık	Republican People's Party
Ceyhun İrgil	Republican People's Party
Orhan Sarıbal	Republican People's Party
Erkan Aydın	Republican People's Party
Nurhayat Altaca Kayıoğlu	Republican People's Party
İsmet Büyükataman	Nationalist Movement Party
Kadir Koçdemir	Nationalist Movement Party
Tevfik Topçu	Nationalist Movement Party
Asiye Kolçak	Peoples' Democratic Party

== Çanakkale ==
Party	Member
CHP	2 / 4
AKP	1 / 4
MHP	1 / 4
HDP	0 / 4

Member	Party
Muharrem Erkek	Republican People's Party
Bülent Öz	Republican People's Party
Bülent Turan	Justice and Development Party
İbrahim Kürşat Tuna	Nationalist Movement Party

== Çankırı ==
Party	Member
AKP	2 / 2
MHP	0 / 2
CHP	0 / 2
HDP	0 / 2

Member	Party
Muhammet Emin Akbaşoğlu	Justice and Development Party
Hüseyin Filiz	Justice and Development Party

== Çorum ==
Party	Member
AKP	3 / 4
CHP	1 / 4
MHP	0 / 4
HDP	0 / 4

Member	Party
Salim Uslu	Justice and Development Party
Cahit Bağcı	Justice and Development Party
Lütfiye İlksen Ceritoğlu Murt	Justice and Development Party
Tufan Köse	Republican People's Party

== Denizli ==
Party	Member
AKP	3 / 7
CHP	3 / 7
MHP	1 / 7
HDP	0 / 7

Member	Party
Nihat Zeybekci	Justice and Development Party
Mehmet Yüksel	Justice and Development Party
Bilal Uçar	Justice and Development Party
Melike Basmacı	Republican People's Party
Kazım Arslan	Republican People's Party
Gülizar Biçer Karaca	Republican People's Party
Emin Haluk Ayhan	Nationalist Movement Party

== Diyarbakır ==
Party	Member
HDP	10 / 11
AKP	1 / 11
MHP	0 / 11
CHP	0 / 11

Member	Party
İdris Baluken	Peoples' Democratic Party
Nursel Aydoğan	Peoples' Democratic Party
Nimetullah Erdoğmuş	Peoples' Democratic Party
Feleknas Uca	Peoples' Democratic Party
Altan Tan	Peoples' Democratic Party
Çağlar Demirel	Peoples' Democratic Party
Ziya Pir	Peoples' Democratic Party
İmam Taşçıer	Peoples' Democratic Party
Sibel Yiğitalp	Peoples' Democratic Party
Edib Berk	Peoples' Democratic Party
Cevdet Yılmaz	Justice and Development Party

== Düzce ==
Party	Member
AKP	3 / 3
CHP	0 / 3
MHP	0 / 3
HDP	0 / 3

Member	Party
Faruk Özlü	Justice and Development Party
Fevai Arslan	Justice and Development Party
Ayşe Keşir	Justice and Development Party

== Edirne ==
Party	Member
CHP	2 / 3
AKP	1 / 3
MHP	0 / 3
HDP	0 / 3

Member	Party
Okan Gaytancıoğlu	Republican People's Party
Erdin Bircan	Republican People's Party
Şemsettin Emir	Justice and Development Party

== Elazığ ==
Party	Member
AKP	3 / 4
MHP	1 / 4
HDP	0 / 4
CHP	0 / 4

Member	Party
Şuay Alpay	Justice and Development Party
Metin Bulut	Justice and Development Party
Serpil Bulut	Justice and Development Party
Yavuz Temizer	Nationalist Movement Party

== Erzincan ==
Party	Member
AKP	1 / 2
CHP	1 / 2
MHP	0 / 2
HDP	0 / 2

Member	Party
Talha Erol Durmaz	Justice and Development Party
Erdoğan Özyalçın	Republican People's Party

== Erzurum ==
Party	Member
AKP	4 / 6
MHP	1 / 6
HDP	1 / 6
CHP	0 / 6

Member	Party
Efkan Ala	Justice and Development Party
Adnan Yılmaz	Justice and Development Party
Zehra Taşkeneslioğlu	Justice and Development Party
İbrahim Aydemir	Justice and Development Party
Kamil Aydın	Nationalist Movement Party
Seher Akçınar Bayar	Peoples' Democratic Party

== Eskişehir ==
Party	Member
CHP	3 / 6
AKP	2 / 6
MHP	1 / 6
HDP	0 / 6

Member	Party
Gaye Usluer	Republican People's Party
Utku Çakırözer	Republican People's Party
Cemal Okan Yüksel	Republican People's Party
Nabi Avcı	Justice and Development Party
Salih Koca	Justice and Development Party
Ruhsar Demirel	Nationalist Movement Party

== Gaziantep ==
Party	Member
AKP	6 / 12
MHP	2 / 12
CHP	2 / 12
HDP	2 / 12

Member	Party
Mehmet Şimşek	Justice and Development Party
Abdülhamit Gül	Justice and Development Party
Şamil Tayyar	Justice and Development Party
Canan Candemir Çelik	Justice and Development Party
Abdullah Nejat Koçer	Justice and Development Party
Mehmet Erdoğan	Justice and Development Party
Ümit Özdağ	Nationalist Movement Party
Ertuğrul Tolga Orhan	Nationalist Movement Party
Mehmet Şeker	Republican People's Party
Mehmet Gökdağ	Republican People's Party
Celal Doğan	Peoples' Democratic Party
Mahmut Toğrul	Peoples' Democratic Party

== Giresun ==
Party	Member
AKP	2 / 4
CHP	1 / 4
MHP	1 / 4
HDP	0 / 4

Member	Party
Turhan Alçelik	Justice and Development Party
Adem Tatlı	Justice and Development Party
Bülent Yener Bektaşoğlu	Republican People's Party
Orhan Erzurum	Nationalist Movement Party

== Gümüşhane ==
Party	Member
AKP	1 / 2
MHP	1 / 2
CHP	0 / 2
HDP	0 / 2

Member	Party
Kemalettin Aydın	Justice and Development Party
Mustafa Canlı	Nationalist Movement Party

== Hakkari ==
Party	Member
HDP	3 / 3
AKP	0 / 3
MHP	0 / 3
CHP	0 / 3

Member	Party
Selma Irmak	Peoples' Democratic Party
Nihat Akdoğan	Peoples' Democratic Party
Abdullah Zeydan	Peoples' Democratic Party

== Hatay ==
Party	Member
AKP	5 / 10
CHP	4 / 10
MHP	1 / 10
HDP	0 / 10

Member	Party
Adem Yeşildal	Justice and Development Party
Orhan Karasayar	Justice and Development Party
Mehmet Öntürk	Justice and Development Party
Mehmet Alğan	Justice and Development Party
Hacı Bayram Türkoğlu	Justice and Development Party
Hilmi Yarayıcı	Republican People's Party
Mevlüt Dudu	Republican People's Party
Serkan Topal	Republican People's Party
Birol Ertem	Republican People's Party
Adnan Şefik Çirkin	Nationalist Movement Party

== Iğdır ==
Party	Member
HDP	2 / 2
AKP	0 / 2
MHP	0 / 2
CHP	0 / 2

Member	Party
Mehmet Emin Adıyaman	Peoples' Democratic Party
Kıznaz Türkeli	Peoples' Democratic Party

== Isparta ==
Party	Member
AKP	2 / 4
MHP	1 / 4
CHP	1 / 4
HDP	0 / 4

Member	Party
Süreyya Sadi Bilgiç	Justice and Development Party
Recep Özel	Justice and Development Party
Nuri Okutan	Nationalist Movement Party
İrfan Bakır	Republican People's Party

== İstanbul ==
Party	Member
AKP	39 / 88
CHP	28 / 88
HDP	11 / 88
MHP	10 / 88

=== 1st electoral district ===
Party	Member
AKP	14 / 31
CHP	11 / 31
HDP	3 / 31
MHP	3 / 31

Member	Party
İdris Güllüce	Justice and Development Party
Mihrimah Belma Satır	Justice and Development Party
Erol Kaya	Justice and Development Party
Ahmet Berat Çonkar	Justice and Development Party
Osman Can	Justice and Development Party
Berat Albayrak	Justice and Development Party
İsmet Uçma	Justice and Development Party
Metin Külünk	Justice and Development Party
Ravza Kavakcı Kan	Justice and Development Party
Erkan Kandemir	Justice and Development Party
Alev Dedegil	Justice and Development Party
Mehmet Ali Pulcu	Justice and Development Party
Hasan Sert	Justice and Development Party
Hüseyin Yayman	Justice and Development Party
Şafak Pavey	Republican People's Party
Gamze Akkuy İlgezdi	Republican People's Party
Gürsel Tekin	Republican People's Party
Barış Yarkadaş	Republican People's Party
Mehmet Akif Hamzaçebi	Republican People's Party
Mahmut Tanal	Republican People's Party
İlhan Kesici	Republican People's Party
Oğuz Kaan Salıcı	Republican People's Party
İhsan Özkes	Republican People's Party
Onursal Adıgüzel	Republican People's Party
Ali Özcan	Republican People's Party
Selahattin Demirtaş	Peoples' Democratic Party
Hüda Kaya	Peoples' Democratic Party
Erdal Ataş	Peoples' Democratic Party
Edip Semih Yalçın	Nationalist Movement Party
İzzet Ulvi Yönter	Nationalist Movement Party
Uygar Suphi Aktan	Nationalist Movement Party

=== 2nd electoral district ===
Party	Member
AKP	12 / 26
CHP	8 / 26
HDP	3 / 26
MHP	3 / 26

Member	Party
Volkan Bozkır	Justice and Development Party
Ayşe Nur Bahçekapılı	Justice and Development Party
Ekrem Erdem	Justice and Development Party
Aziz Babuşçu	Justice and Development Party
Durmuş Ali Sarıkaya	Justice and Development Party
Ethem Tolga	Justice and Development Party
Şirin Ünal	Justice and Development Party
Fatma Benli	Justice and Development Party
Hüseyin Bürge	Justice and Development Party
Sevim Savaşer	Justice and Development Party
Haydar Ali Yıldız	Justice and Development Party
Marka Eseyan	Justice and Development Party
Selina Doğan	Republican People's Party
Aykut Erdoğdu	Republican People's Party
Mustafa Sezgin Tanrıkulu	Republican People's Party
Dursun Çiçek	Republican People's Party
Süleyman Sencer Ayata	Republican People's Party
Gülay Yedekci Arslan	Republican People's Party
Kadri Enis Berberoğlu	Republican People's Party
Didem Engin	Republican People's Party
Turgut Öker	Peoples' Democratic Party
Filiz Kerestecioğlu	Peoples' Democratic Party
Sezai Temelli	Peoples' Democratic Party
Ekmeleddin İhsanoğlu	Nationalist Movement Party
Celal Adan	Nationalist Movement Party
Murat Başesgioğlu	Nationalist Movement Party

=== 3rd electoral district ===
Party	Member
AKP	13 / 31
CHP	9 / 31
HDP	5 / 31
MHP	4 / 31

Member	Party
Mustafa Şentop	Justice and Development Party
Özlem Zengin	Justice and Development Party
Feyzullah Kıyıklık	Justice and Development Party
Mehmet Muş	Justice and Development Party
Mehmet Doğan Kubat	Justice and Development Party
Tülay Kaynarca	Justice and Development Party
Abdurrahim Boynukalın	Justice and Development Party
Harun Karaca	Justice and Development Party
Uğur Işılak	Justice and Development Party
Mustafa Yeneroğlu	Justice and Development Party
Mustafa Afşin Yazıcıoğlu	Justice and Development Party
Mehmet Metiner	Justice and Development Party
Halis Dalkılıç	Justice and Development Party
Bihlun Tamaylıgil	Republican People's Party
İlhan Cihaner	Republican People's Party
Engin Altay	Republican People's Party
Ali Şeker	Republican People's Party
Erdoğan Toprak	Republican People's Party
Eren Erdem	Republican People's Party
Murat Özçelik	Republican People's Party
Zeynel Emre	Republican People's Party
Mehmet Bekaroğlu	Republican People's Party
Pervin Buldan	Peoples' Democratic Party
Garo Paylan	Peoples' Democratic Party
Abdullah Levent Tüzel	Peoples' Democratic Party
Ali Kenanoğlu	Peoples' Democratic Party
Emine Beyza Üstün	Peoples' Democratic Party
Meral Akşener	Nationalist Movement Party
Atila Kaya	Nationalist Movement Party
İsmail Faruk Aksu	Nationalist Movement Party
Arzu Erdem	Nationalist Movement Party

== İzmir ==
Party	Member
CHP	12 / 26
AKP	8 / 26
MHP	4 / 26
HDP	2 / 26

=== 1st electoral district ===
Party	Member
CHP	6 / 13
AKP	4 / 13
MHP	2 / 13
HDP	1 / 13

Member	Party
Selin Sayek Böke	Republican People's Party
Musa Çam	Republican People's Party
Ahmet Tuncay Özkan	Republican People's Party
Tacettin Bayır	Republican People's Party
Özcan Purçu	Republican People's Party
Ali Yiğit	Republican People's Party
Veysel Eroğlu	Justice and Development Party
Fatma Seniha Nükhet Hotar	Justice and Development Party
Cemil Şeboy	Justice and Development Party
Hüseyin Kocabıyık	Justice and Development Party
Oktay Vural	Nationalist Movement Party
Aslan Savaşan	Nationalist Movement Party
Ertuğrul Kürkçü	Peoples' Democratic Party

=== 2nd electoral district ===
Party	Member
CHP	6 / 13
AKP	4 / 13
MHP	2 / 13
HDP	1 / 13

Member	Party
Zeynep Altıok	Republican People's Party
Kemal Kılıçdaroğlu	Republican People's Party
Zekeriya Temizel	Republican People's Party
Mustafa Ali Balbay	Republican People's Party
Aytun Çıray	Republican People's Party
Kamil Okyay Sındır	Republican People's Party
Mustafa İbrahim Turhan	Justice and Development Party
Nesrim Ulema	Justice and Development Party
Hamza Dağ	Justice and Development Party
Kerem Ali Sürekli	Justice and Development Party
Ahmet Kenan Tanrıkulu	Nationalist Movement Party
Murat Koç	Nationalist Movement Party
Müslüm Doğan	Peoples' Democratic Party

== Kahramanmaraş ==
Party	Member
AKP	6 / 8
MHP	2 / 8
CHP	0 / 8
HDP	0 / 8

Member	Party
Mahir Ünal	Justice and Development Party
Nursel Reyhanlıoğlu	Justice and Development Party
Veysi Kaynak	Justice and Development Party
Sevde Bayazıt Kaçar	Justice and Development Party
Mehmet Uğur Dilipak	Justice and Development Party
Mehmet İlker Çitil	Justice and Development Party
Fahrettin Oğuz Tor	Nationalist Movement Party
Sefer Aycan	Nationalist Movement Party

== Karabük ==
Party	Member
AKP	1 / 2
MHP	1 / 2
CHP	0 / 2
HDP	0 / 2

Member	Party
Osman Kahveci	Justice and Development Party
Durmuş Yalçın	Nationalist Movement Party

== Karaman ==
Party	Member
AKP	2 / 2
MHP	0 / 2
CHP	0 / 2
HDP	0 / 2

Member	Party
Recep Konuk	Justice and Development Party
Recep Şeker	Justice and Development Party

== Kars ==
Party	Member
HDP	2 / 3
AKP	1 / 3
MHP	0 / 3
CHP	0 / 3

Member	Party
Ayhan Bilgen	Peoples' Democratic Party
Şafak Özanli	Peoples' Democratic Party
Mehmet Uçum	Justice and Development Party

== Kastamonu ==
Party	Member
AKP	2 / 3
MHP	1 / 3
CHP	0 / 3
HDP	0 / 3

Member	Party
Mustafa Gökhan Gülşen	Justice and Development Party
Metin Çelik	Justice and Development Party
Emin Çınar	Nationalist Movement Party

== Kayseri ==
Party	Member
AKP	5 / 9
MHP	3 / 9
CHP	1 / 9
HDP	0 / 9

Member	Party
Mehmet Özhaseki	Justice and Development Party
Ahmet Doğan	Justice and Development Party
Yaşar Karayel	Justice and Development Party
Kemal Tekden	Justice and Development Party
Havva Talay Çalış	Justice and Development Party
Yusuf Halaçoğlu	Nationalist Movement Party
Ali Kilci	Nationalist Movement Party
Süleyman Korkmaz	Nationalist Movement Party
Çetin Arık	Republican People's Party

== Kırıkkale ==
Party	Member
AKP	2 / 3
MHP	1 / 3
CHP	0 / 3
HDP	0 / 3

Member	Party
Oğuz Kaan Köksal	Justice and Development Party
Ramazan Can	Justice and Development Party
Seyit Ahmet Göçer	Nationalist Movement Party

== Kırklareli ==
Party	Member
CHP	2 / 3
AKP	1 / 3
MHP	0 / 3
HDP	0 / 3

Member	Party
Türabi Kayan	Republican People's Party
Vecdi Gündoğdu	Republican People's Party
Hamdi Irmak	Justice and Development Party

== Kırşehir ==
Party	Member
AKP	1 / 2
MHP	1 / 2
CHP	0 / 2
HDP	0 / 2

Member	Party
Salih Çetinkaya	Justice and Development Party
Cemil Yıldırım Türk	Nationalist Movement Party

== Kilis ==
Party	Member
AKP	1 / 2
MHP	1 / 2
CHP	0 / 2
HDP	0 / 2

Member	Party
Reşit Polat	Justice and Development Party
Mustafa Yün	Nationalist Movement Party

== Kocaeli ==
Party	Member
AKP	6 / 11
CHP	3 / 11
MHP	1 / 11
HDP	1 / 11

Member	Party
Fikri Işık	Justice and Development Party
Radiye Sezer Katırcıoğlu	Justice and Development Party
Zeki Aygün	Justice and Development Party
İlyas Şeker	Justice and Development Party
Mehmet Akif Yılmaz	Justice and Development Party
Cemalettin Kaflı	Justice and Development Party
Fatma Kaplan Hürriyet	Republican People's Party
Haydar Akar	Republican People's Party
Tahsin Tarhan	Republican People's Party
Saffet Sancaklı	Nationalist Movement Party
Ali Haydar Konca	Peoples' Democratic Party

== Konya ==
Party	Member
AKP	11 / 14
MHP	2 / 14
CHP	1 / 14
HDP	0 / 14

Member	Party
Ahmet Davutoğlu	Justice and Development Party
Mustafa Baloğlu	Justice and Development Party
Hüsniye Erdoğan	Justice and Development Party
Ziya Altunyaldız	Justice and Development Party
Muhammet Uğur Kaleli	Justice and Development Party
Leyla Şahin Usta	Justice and Development Party
Mehmet Babaoğlu	Justice and Development Party
Abdullah Ağralı	Justice and Development Party
Halil Etyemez	Justice and Development Party
Rüveyde Gülseren Işık	Justice and Development Party
Hacı Ahmet Özdemir	Justice and Development Party
Mustafa Kalaycı	Nationalist Movement Party
Mustafa Sait Gönen	Nationalist Movement Party
Mustafa Hüsnü Bozkurt	Republican People's Party

== Kütahya ==
Party	Member
AKP	3 / 4
MHP	1 / 4
CHP	0 / 4
HDP	0 / 4

Member	Party
Mustafa Şükrü Nazlı	Justice and Development Party
Vural Kavuncu	Justice and Development Party
İshak Gazel	Justice and Development Party
Alim Işık	Nationalist Movement Party

== Malatya ==
Party	Member
AKP	5 / 6
CHP	1 / 6
MHP	0 / 6
HDP	0 / 6

Member	Party
Öznür Çalık	Justice and Development Party
Taha Özhan	Justice and Development Party
Mustafa Şahin	Justice and Development Party
Nurettin Yaşar	Justice and Development Party
Bülent Tüfenkci	Justice and Development Party
Veli Ağbaba	Republican People's Party

== Manisa ==
Party	Member
AKP	4 / 9
CHP	3 / 9
MHP	2 / 9
HDP	0 / 9

Member	Party
Recai Berber	Justice and Development Party
Uğur Aydemir	Justice and Development Party
Selçuk Özdağ	Justice and Development Party
Murat Baybatur	Justice and Development Party
Özgür Özel	Republican People's Party
Mazlum Nurlu	Republican People's Party
Tur Yıldız Biçer	Republican People's Party
Erkan Akçay	Nationalist Movement Party
Zeynep Balkız	Nationalist Movement Party

== Mardin ==
Party	Member
HDP	5 / 6
AKP	1 / 6
CHP	0 / 6
MHP	0 / 6

Member	Party
Mithat Sancar	Peoples' Democratic Party
Gülser Yıldırım	Peoples' Democratic Party
Erol Dora	Peoples' Democratic Party
Mehmet Ali Aslan	Peoples' Democratic Party
Enise Güneyli	Peoples' Democratic Party
Orhan Miroğlu	Justice and Development Party

== Mersin ==
Member	Party
Hüseyin Çamak	Republican People's Party
Fikri Sağlar	Republican People's Party
Aytuğ Atıcı	Republican People's Party
Mustafa Muhammet Gültak	Justice and Development Party
Yılmaz Tezcan	Justice and Development Party
Muhsin Kızılkaya	Justice and Development Party
Oktay Öztürk	Nationalist Movement Party
Baki Şimşek	Nationalist Movement Party
Ali Öz	Nationalist Movement Party
Dengir Mir Mehmet Fırat	Peoples' Democratic Party
Çilem Küçükkeleş Öz	Peoples' Democratic Party

== Muğla ==
Member	Party
Akın Üstündağ	Republican People's Party
Ömer Süha Aldan	Republican People's Party
Nurettin Demir	Republican People's Party
Hasan Özyer	Justice and Development Party
Hasan Kökten	Justice and Development Party
Mehmet Erdoğan	Nationalist Movement Party

== Muş ==
Member	Party
Burcu Çelik Özkan	Peoples' Democratic Party
Ahmet Yıldırım	Peoples' Democratic Party
Mehmet Emin Şimşek	Justice and Development Party

== Nevşehir ==
Member	Party
Mustafa Açıkgöz	Justice and Development Party
Murat Göktürk	Justice and Development Party
Mehmet Varol	Nationalist Movement Party

== Niğde ==
Member	Party
Alpaslan Kavaklıoğlu	Justice and Development Party
Erdoğan Özegen	Justice and Development Party
Vedat Bayram	Nationalist Movement Party

== Ordu ==
Member	Party
Numan Kurtulmuş	Justice and Development Party
Oktay Çanak	Justice and Development Party
İhsan Şener	Justice and Development Party
Seyit Torun	Republican People's Party
Mustafa Adıgüzel	Republican People's Party

== Osmaniye ==
Member	Party
Devlet Bahçeli	Nationalist Movement Party
Ruhi Ersoy	Nationalist Movement Party
Suat Önal	Justice and Development Party
Mücahit Durmuşoğlu	Justice and Development Party

== Rize ==
Member	Party
Hasan Karal	Justice and Development Party
Hikmet Ayar	Justice and Development Party
Osman Aşkın Bak	Justice and Development Party

== Sakarya ==
Member	Party
Ayşenur İslam	Justice and Development Party
Mustafa İsen	Justice and Development Party
Ali İhsan Yavuz	Justice and Development Party
Recep Uncuoğlu	Justice and Development Party
Ali İnci	Justice and Development Party
Zihni Açba	Nationalist Movement Party
Engin Özkoç	Republican People's Party

== Samsun ==
Member	Party
Akif Çağatay Kılıç	Justice and Development Party
Ahmet Demircan	Justice and Development Party
Fuat Köktaş	Justice and Development Party
Çiğdem Karaaslan	Justice and Development Party
Hasan Basri Kurt	Justice and Development Party
Kemal Zeybek	Republican People's Party
Hayati Tekin	Republican People's Party
Erhan Usta	Nationalist Movement Party
Hüseyin Edis	Nationalist Movement Party

== Siirt ==
Member	Party
Kadri Yıldırım	Peoples' Democratic Party
Hatice Seviptekin	Peoples' Democratic Party
Yasin Aktay	Justice and Development Party

== Sinop ==
Member	Party
Cengiz Tokmak	Justice and Development Party
Barış Karadeniz	Republican People's Party

== Sivas ==
Member	Party
İsmet Yılmaz	Justice and Development Party
Hilmi Bilgin	Justice and Development Party
Selim Dursun	Justice and Development Party
Celal Dağgez	Nationalist Movement Party
Ali Akyıldız	Republican People's Party

== Şanlıurfa ==
Member	Party
Nureddin Nebati	Justice and Development Party
Mehmet Kasım Gülpınar	Justice and Development Party
Seyit Eyyüpoğlu	Justice and Development Party
Mazhar Bağlı	Justice and Development Party
Halil Özcan	Justice and Development Party
Hamide Sürücü	Justice and Development Party
Ahmet Eşref Fakıbaba	Justice and Development Party
Osman Baydemir	Peoples' Democratic Party
Dilek Öcalan	Peoples' Democratic Party
İbrahim Ayhan	Peoples' Democratic Party
Leyla Güven	Peoples' Democratic Party
Ziya Çalışkan	Peoples' Democratic Party

== Şırnak ==
Member	Party
Faysal Sarıyıldız	Peoples' Democratic Party
Leyla Birlik	Peoples' Democratic Party
Ferhat Encü	Peoples' Democratic Party
Aycan İrmez	Peoples' Democratic Party

== Tekirdağ ==
Member	Party
Faik Öztrak	Republican People's Party
Candan Yüceer	Republican People's Party
Emre Köprülü	Republican People's Party
Mustafa Yel	Justice and Development Party
Ayşe Doğan	Justice and Development Party
Bülent Belen	Nationalist Movement Party

== Tokat ==
Member	Party
Coşkun Çakır	Justice and Development Party
Celil Göçer	Justice and Development Party
Fatma Gaye Güler	Justice and Development Party
Abdurrahman Başkan	Nationalist Movement Party
Orhan Düzgün	Republican People's Party

== Trabzon ==
Member	Party
Süleyman Soylu	Justice and Development Party
Muhammet Balta	Justice and Development Party
Ayşe Sula Köseoğlu	Justice and Development Party
Adnan Günnar	Justice and Development Party
Koray Aydın	Nationalist Movement Party
Haluk Pekşen	Republican People's Party

== Tunceli ==
Member	Party
Alican Önlü	Peoples' Democratic Party
Edibe Şahin	Peoples' Democratic Party

== Uşak ==
Member	Party
Mehmet Altay	Justice and Development Party
Özkan Yalım	Republican People's Party
Durmuş Yılmaz	Nationalist Movement Party

== Van ==
Member	Party
Figen Yüksekdağ	Peoples' Democratic Party
Lezgin Botan	Peoples' Democratic Party
Yurdusev Özsökmenler	Peoples' Democratic Party
Adem Özcaner	Peoples' Democratic Party
Tuğba Hezer Öztürk	Peoples' Democratic Party
Selami Özyaşar	Peoples' Democratic Party
Remzi Özgökçe	Peoples' Democratic Party
Burhan Kayatürk	Justice and Development Party

== Yalova ==
Member	Party
Fikri Demirel	Justice and Development Party
Muharrem İnce	Republican People's Party

== Yozgat ==
Member	Party
Abdülkadir Akgül	Justice and Development Party
Ertuğrul Soysal	Justice and Development Party
Yusuf Başer	Justice and Development Party
Sadir Durmaz	Nationalist Movement Party

== Zonguldak ==
Member	Party
Şerafettin Turpcu	Republican People's Party
Ünal Demirtaş	Republican People's Party
Hüseyin Özbakır	Justice and Development Party
Faruk Çaturoğlu	Justice and Development Party
Zeki Çakan	Nationalist Movement Party
