= Nergis =

Nergis can be both a feminine given name and a surname. Notable people with the name include:

== Given name ==
- Nergis Kumbasar, Turkish model, actress, presenter, and scenarist
- Nergis Mavalvala, Pakistani-American astrophysicist
- Nergis Öztürk, Turkish actress

== Surname ==
- Hülya Nergis, Turkish politician and lawyer
