= Mehmet Demir =

Turkish politician

Mehmet Demir is a Kurdish politician with the People's Democratic Party (HDP) in Turkey, and served as co-mayor of Batman until his removal by the Turkish state in March 2020.

Demir was dismissed from his post on Monday, 23 March 2020 and subsequently arrested along with Diyarbakır’s Silvan District Mayor Naşide Toprak, Ergani District Mayor Ahmet Kaya, Lice Mayor Tarık Mercan and Eğil District Mayor Mustafa Akkul. The HDP also stated that Yenişehir Co-Mayor Belgin Diken, Batman Vice Co-Mayors Şehriban Aydın and Salih Çetinkaya, Batman Municipal Assembly Co-Spokespersons Şükran Çelebi and Recep Yargı had also been detained.

According to pro-government Turkish newspaper Daily Sabah, Turkey has now "removed the elected administrations of 93 municipalities in the region for their links to the PKK terrorist group". The HDP denies links to the PKK, and HDP co-leader Mithat Sancar told Reuters that "We reject with hatred this vile attempt that does not shy away from showing enmity against Kurds even in these difficult days when the whole world is battling an epidemic".

Cumhuriyet newspaper reported that police detained 16 people for protesting the decision to remove the mayor in front of Batman city hall after HDP Batman Deputy Ayşe Acar Başaran made a statement in front of supporters.
