= Şerafettin Turpcu =

Turkish politician

Dirayet Taşdemir MP

Member of the Grand National Assembly
- Incumbent
- Assumed office 7 June 2015
- Constituency: Zonguldak (June 2015, Nov 2015)

Personal details
- Born: September 20, 1955 (age 71)
- Party: Republican People's Party
- Education: Istanbul Technical University
- Occupation: Politician

Şerafettin Turpcu (born 20 September 1955) is a Turkish politician from the Republican People's Party (CHP), who has served as a Member of Parliament for Zonguldak.

== Biography ==
Şerafettin Turpcu was born on 20 September 1955 in Zonguldak Province, Turkey as the son of Yünüs and Behice Turpcu. He completed his primary and secondary education in Çatalağzı. After completing his high-school education in Zonguldak at Kilimli High School, he graduated from Istanbul Technical University (İTÜ) Faculty of Architecture in 1981. Turpcu became involved in politics at a young age. He is married and has two children.

Turpcu began his political career in the Social Democratic Populist Party (SHP). He was elected as a Republican People's Party (CHP) Member of Parliament for Zonguldak in the June 2015 general election. He was re-elected in November 2015.

== See also ==
- 26th Parliament of Turkey
