= Çiğdem Karaaslan =

Turkish politician (born 1979)

Çiğdem Karaaslan (born 13 August 1979) is a Turkish politician for the Justice and Development Party in Turkey and Deputy of Samsun and architect

== Biography ==
She graduated from Bilkent University Faculty of Fine Arts, Design and Architecture Department of Urban Design and Landscape Architecture as an honor student. She completed her master's thesis on "The Problem of Deidentification in Historical Towns" at Ankara University. She continues her academic career in the department of Social Policies at Yıldırım Beyazıt University.

Karaaslan, who was the 25th and 26th term deputy of Samsun, was appointed as the deputy chairwoman in charge of Environment, Urbanism and Culture. She is fluently speak English.

She is married and has two children.
