= Abdurrahman Başkan =

Turkish politician (born 1964)

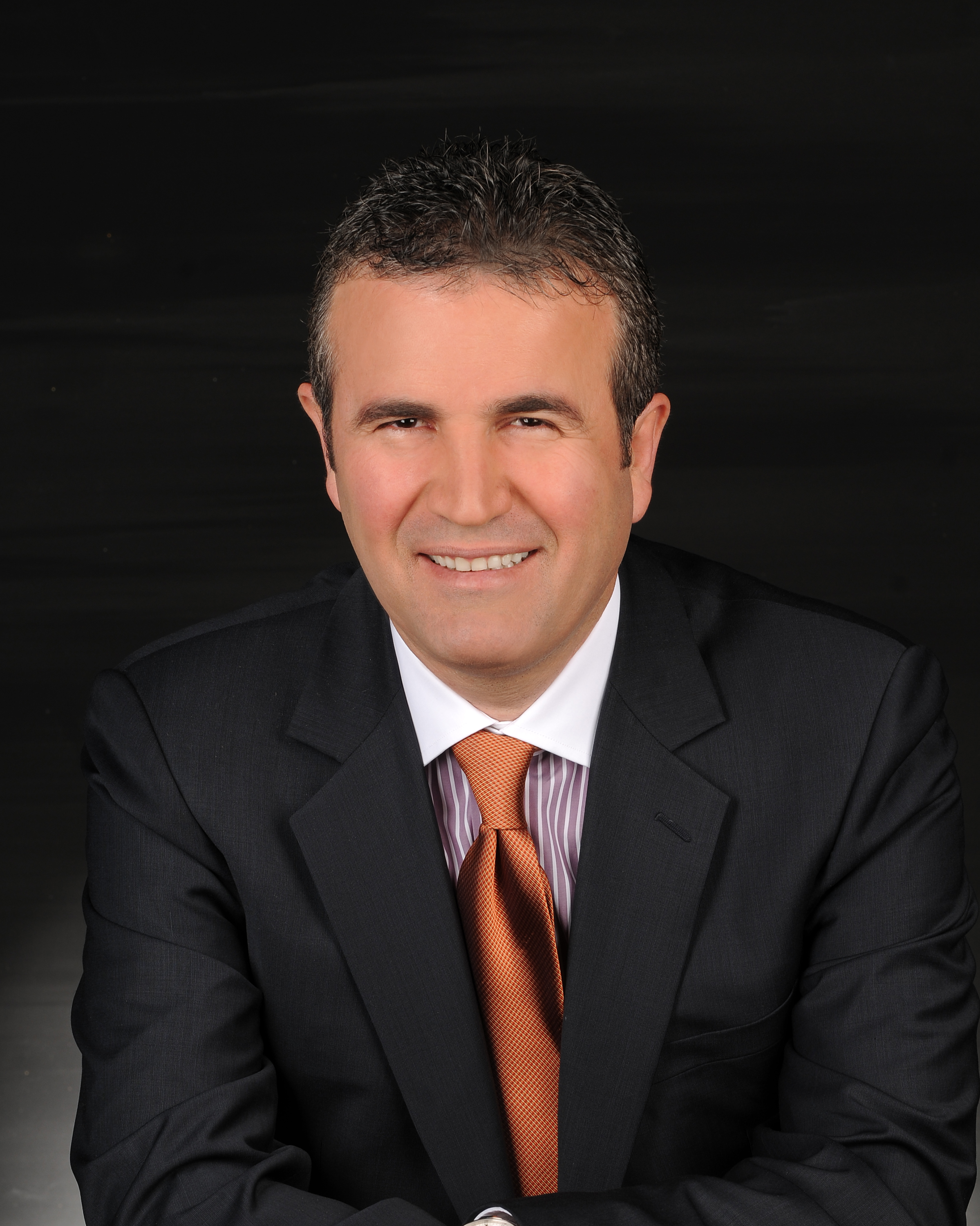
Abdurrahman Başkan in 2010

Abdurrahman Başkan (born 1964) is an agricultural engineer and politician. A member of MHP, Başkan represents Antalya in the Grand National Assembly of Turkey. He is the member of Central Executive Committee and Central Decision Board Nationalist Movement Party, and Chief Executive Officer.

== Early life ==
Abdurrahman was born in 1964 in Zile district of Tokat Province, Turkey. He completed his primary education at "Hüseyin Gazi" primary school of Zile in 1975 and his secondary education at Fevzi Çakmak secondary school of Zile in 1978 and his high school at Zile Vocational and Technical High School in 1981. In 1988, he graduated from Faculty of Agriculture Department of plant protection and became an agricultural engineer. He served in Turkish Armed Forces as a Junior Lieutenant in Tekirdağ province between 1989 and 1990.

== Career ==
He started his career as an engineer and manager in an international company between 1991 and 1995. He created his own companies in 1995. He currently (in 2018) works as the Chairman of the Group's Board of Directors. Then he merged these companies under the name of the "Başkan Group".
