= Adnan Boynukara =

Turkish politician (born 1964)

Adnan Boynukara MP

Member of the Grand National Assembly
- Incumbent
- Assumed office 7 June 2015
- Constituency: Adıyaman (June 2015, Nov 2015)

Personal details
- Born: 4 February 1964 (age 62) Adıyaman, Turkey
- Party: Justice and Development Party (AKP)
- Occupation: Politician
- Profession: Meteorology engineer

Adnan Boynukara (born 4 February 1964) is a Turkish politician from the Justice and Development Party (AKP), who has served as a Member of Parliament for Adıyaman since 7 June 2015.

Born in Adıyaman, he received his early education in Malatya and became a meteorology engineer. In 2009, he began working as a senior advisor in the Ministry of Justice. He was elected as an AKP Member of Parliament in the June 2015 general election.

== See also ==
- 25th Parliament of Turkey
