= Emine Nur Günay =

Turkish economist and politician

Emine Nur Günay (born 13 August 1962, in Eskişehir) is a Turkish economist, politician, member of the Turkish Parliament, member of the Justice and development party in Turkey, and Deputy of Eskişehir
