= Fikri Demirel =

Turkish MP for Yalova since 7 June 2015

Fikri Demirel MP
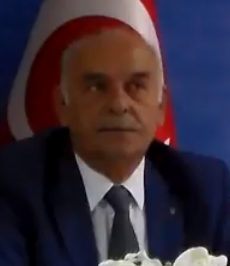

Member of the Grand National Assembly
- Incumbent
- Assumed office 7 June 2015
- Constituency: Yalova (June 2015, Nov 2015)

Personal details
- Born: 2 November 1956 (age 69) Rize, Turkey
- Party: Justice and Development Party
- Education: Ankara Eğitim Enstitüsü

Fikri Demirel (born November 2, 1956) is a Turkish politician from the Justice and Development Party (AK Party) who serves as a Member of Parliament for the Yalova since 7 June 2015.

== Early life and career ==
Fikri Demirel was born on November 2, 1956, in Rize to Ali Demirel and his wife Sabire. He completed his primary and secondary education in Erzurum, and his high school education in Istanbul. Demirel graduated from Ankara Eğitim Enstitüsü. He is married and has two children.

== Political career ==
Demirel participated in the establishment of the Justice and Development Party (AK Party) Yalova branch. He became the provincial President of the AK Party's Yalova Branch in 2003, serving until 2007. He was elected as a Member of Parliament for the electoral district of Yalova in the June 2015 general election and was re-elected in the November 2015 general election.

== See also ==
- 26th Parliament of Turkey
