= Yasin Aktay =

Turkish politician (born 1966)

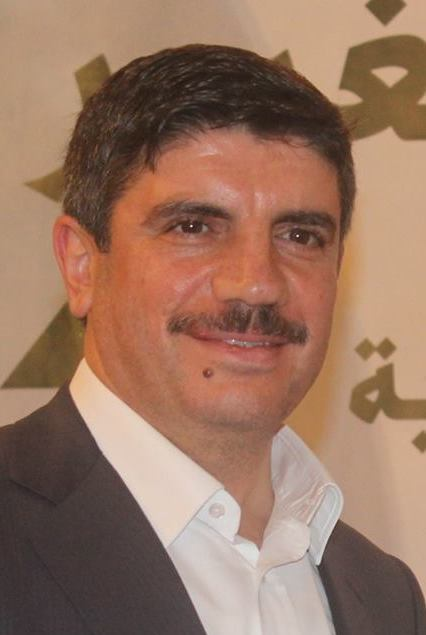
Portrait of Yasin Aktay

Yasin Aktay (born 1966 in Siirt, Turkey) is a deputy chairman of the AK Party and head of the Turkish Group of Inter-Parliamentarian Union. He is also known as one of the chief aides to the Turkish President Recep Tayyip Erdoğan. Before assuming this role, he served as a spokesman for the party. Aktay is fluent in English and Arabic. He was elected as the deputy of Siirt in the 25th Parliament of Turkey.

== Academic career ==
Aktay obtained his bachelor's degree in 1990, master's degree in 1993 and PhD in 1997 from the Department of Sociology at Middle East Technical University at Ankara. In 1999 he became an associate professor in the field of applied sociology and in 2005 a professor in the field of sociology of institutions. He spent 20 years as an academician at Selçuk University (Konya), where he started as a research assistant in 1992. He is now affiliated with and teaching in Ankara Yıldırım Bayazıt University, Department of Sociology. Aktay was teaching and doing research at Utah University and University of Maine at Farmington between 2001 and 2004.

He has been editing the Tezkire Journal of Social Science Thought and Politics that he founded with a group of his friends in 1991 and the Sivil Toplum Journal founded in 2002. He is also editorial member of the Journals Milel and Nihal and ReOrient: Critical Muslim Studies. Aktay managed a think-tank institute based in Ankara for four years: Institute for Strategic Thinking, where he is still an honorarium president.

Aktay is a sociologist at Selçuk University in Konya. He has authored several books related to political Islam. He is left-handed.
