= İbrahim Özdiş =

Turkish politician (born 1956)

İbrahim Özdiş MP

Member of the Grand National Assembly
- Incumbent
- Assumed office 7 June 2015
- Constituency: Adana (June 2015, Nov 2015)
- In office 20 October 1991 – 24 December 1995
- Constituency: Adana (1991)

Personal details
- Born: January 17, 1956 (age 70) Adana, Turkey
- Party: Republican People's Party (CHP); Social Democratic Populist Party (SHP) (1991-1995)
- Education: Çukurova University
- Occupation: Politician
- Profession: Engineer

İbrahim Özdiş (born 17 January 1956) is a Turkish politician from the Republican People's Party (CHP), who has served as a Member of Parliament for Adana since 7 June 2015. He previously served as a Social Democratic Populist Party (SHP) Member of Parliament for Adana between 1991 and 1995.

Born in Adana, Özdiş graduated from Çukurova University as a construction engineer in 1979 and began a career in politics in the same year as a member of the CHP Adana branch Executive Board. After the party was shut down in the 1980 military coup, he became the Deputy Mayor of Adana and served between 1989 and 1991. In the 1991 general election, he was elected as an MP for Adana from the SHP, joining the CHP after the party was re-established in 1992. After the 1995 general election, he worked as a technical advisor until 2014. He was elected again as a CHP Member of Parliament in the June 2015 general election.

== See also ==
- 25th Parliament of Turkey
