= Elif Doğan Türkmen =

Turkish politician (born 1962)

Elif Doğan Türkmen MP

Member of the Grand National Assembly
- Incumbent
- Assumed office 7 June 2015
- Constituency: Adana (June 2015, Nov 2015)

Personal details
- Born: 1 January 1962 (age 64) Adana, Turkey
- Party: Republican People's Party (CHP)
- Education: Ankara University
- Occupation: Politician
- Profession: Lawyer

Elif Doğan Türkmen (born 1 January 1962) is a Turkish politician from the Republican People's Party (CHP), who has served as a Member of Parliament for Adana since 7 June 2015.

Born in Adana, Türkmen graduated from Ankara University Faculty of Law and worked as a lawyer in Adana. Coming from a traditionally social democrat family, she had previously been involved in SODEP and was a founding member of the Social Democratic Populist Party (SHP) Women's wing. She joined the CHP after the latter two parties were dissolved. She has been involved in many projects to help women and development in Adana, with some backed by the European Union. Married with one child, she was elected as a CHP Member of Parliament in the June 2015 general election. During the election campaign, she was shot and injured by one of her clients. The attack was described as a scare tactic and not to cause fatal injury.

== See also ==
- 25th Parliament of Turkey
