= Zülfikar İnönü Tümer =

Turkish politician (born 1966)

Zülfikar İnönü Tümer MP

Member of the Grand National Assembly
- Incumbent
- Assumed office 7 June 2015
- Constituency: Adana (June 2015, Nov 2015)

Personal details
- Born: 1966 (age 59–60) Turkey
- Party: Republican People's Party (CHP)
- Education: Istanbul Technical University
- Occupation: Politician
- Profession: Engineer

Zülfikar İnönü Tümer (born 1966) is a Turkish politician from the Republican People's Party (CHP), who has served as a Member of Parliament for Adana since 7 June 2015.

Tümer graduated from Istanbul Technical University as a construction engineer and founded his own construction company shortly afterwards. He worked as an engineer for the construction of roads and bridges, as well as property restoration projects. He is the son of former CHP MP Emin Bilen Tümer, who served as an MP between 1973 and 1977. He was elected as a CHP Member of Parliament in the June 2015 general election.

== See also ==
- 25th Parliament of Turkey
