= Mehmet Şükrü Erdinç =

Turkish politician (born 1976)

Mehmet Şükrü Erdinç MP

Member of the Grand National Assembly
- In office 28 June 2011 – 14 May 2023
- Constituency: Adana (2011, June 2015, Nov 2015, 2018)

Personal details
- Born: January 4, 1976 (age 50) Adıyaman, Turkey
- Party: Justice and Development Party (AKP)
- Occupation: Politician
- Profession: Lawyer
- Website: personal website

Mehmet Şükrü Erdinç (born 4 January 1976) is a Turkish politician from the Justice and Development Party (AKP), who has served as a Member of Parliament for Adana since 12 June 2011.

Born in Adıyaman, Erdinç graduated from Adana Imam Hatip school and went on to train as a lawyer. He became active in the AKP first as a youth member, working in the party's Çukurova district branch and participating in the party's campaign in every election that it contested. He was elected as an AKP Member of Parliament in the 2011 general election and was re-elected in June 2015.

== See also ==
- 25th Parliament of Turkey
