= Serkan Bayram =

Turkish politician and lawyer

Serkan Bayram (born 1 April 1974) is a Turkish politician and lawyer serving as a member of the Turkish Grand Assembly (Turkish: Türkiye Büyük Millet Meclisi, abbreviated as TBMM) for the Justice and Development Party (AK Party). He represented Erzincan Province from 2015 to 2018 and has represented Istanbul since 2018.

== Early life and career ==
Serkan Bayram was born on 1 April 1974 in the village of Refahiye in the province of Erzincan, the son of Mustafa and Emina Bayram. He graduated from the Faculty of Law at Istanbul University in 1996, and worked as a lawyer. In 2000, he received a master's degree from the Marmara University's Faculty of Social Sciences, and has pursued doctoral studies in commercial law at Maltepe University. He also worked as a newspaper columnist.

== Political career ==
Bayram joined the Justice and Development Party and was elected to the Grand National Assembly as a deputy for Erzincan in the November 2015 Turkish general election, having previously been a candidate in the June 2015 Turkish general election. During the 26th parliamentary term he served on the Justice Commission, the Security and Intelligence Commission and a parliamentary Commission investigating the 2016 Turkish coup attempt. In the 2018 Turkish general election Bayram was elected to represent Istanbul instead of Erzincan, and he was reelected for Istanbul in the 2023 Turkish general election. During the 27th term he served as a secretary member (''kâtip üye'') of the Security and Intelligence Commission.

He has also served as a lawyer for Binali Yıldırım, a former Prime Minister of Turkey and speaker of the Grand National Assembly.

== Personal life ==
Bayram speaks French. He is married and has two children.
