= Osman Can =

Turkish politician

- Education: University of Cologne
- Occupations: Law professor, judge
- Employer: Turkish Constitutional Court

Osman Can is a Law Professor and Reporting Judge at the Constitutional Court of Turkey. He holds a PhD from the University of Cologne, Germany.

== Biography ==
In 2009, Can received a call from TOBB University of Economics and Technology in Ankara. Previously, he had served as an Assistant Lecturer for constitutional law at the University of Erzincan (2000 to 2002). Since 2002, he also worked as a Reporting Judge at the Turkish Constitutional Court dealing with cases concerning prohibitions on political parties, fundamental rights and constitutional amendments. In 2002, he founded the German-Turkish Forum of Public Law (Deutsch-Türkisches Staatsrechtlerforum) and has subsequently acted as Head of the Turkish section.

In 2010, he was selected as Jurist of the Year in Turkey.

On 26 September 2012, following the invitation of the former leader of Justice and Development Party (AKP), Recep Tayyip Erdoğan, he became a member of AKP and subsequently has been elected to the board of the party.

He entered into the parliament after the general elections which was held on 7 June 2015, but he has not been nominated for the following snap election which took place 5 months after on 1 November 2015.

== Bibliography ==
Osman Can's publications include:

- The Turkish Constitutional Court as a Defender of the Raison d'Etat, in Constitutionalism in Islamic Countries: Between Upheaval and Continuity, eds. Rainer Grote and Tilmann Röder (OUP 2011)
- Der Schutz staatlicher Ehre und religiöser Gefühle und die Unabhängigkeit der Justiz (with Otto Depenheuer and Ilyas Dogan, 2008)
- Auf dem Weg zu gemeinsamen europäischen Grundrechtsstandards (with Otto Depenheuer and Ilyas Dogan, 2007)
- Die Schranken der Meinungsäußerungsfreiheit nach türkischem Verfassungsrecht (Shaker Verlag, 2001)
