= Nursel Reyhanlıoğlu =

Turkish politician (born 1968)

Grand National Assembly of Turkey 25th and 26th Term kahramanmaraş Deputy

Personal details
- Born: 3 March 1968 (age 58)
- Party: Justice and Development Party
- Profession: Pharmacist, politician

Nursel Reyhanlıoğlu (born 3 March 1968) is a Turkish pharmacist and politician.

She was born in Kahramanmaraş in 3 March 1968. She graduated from Gazi University Faculty of Pharmacy. She served as a president for AK Party women branch in Kahramanmaraş. She was elected as Kahramanmaraş deputy in 25th and 26th terms. She is married and has two children.

During 2023 Turkey-Syria earthquake she criticized Ekrem İmamoğlu (Mayor of Istanbul) who visited the city after the earthquake. She said, "Why are you here? Take care of Istanbul. Go away out of here! Don't show off here! Servant of England, get out!"
