= Besime Konca =

Kurdish politician

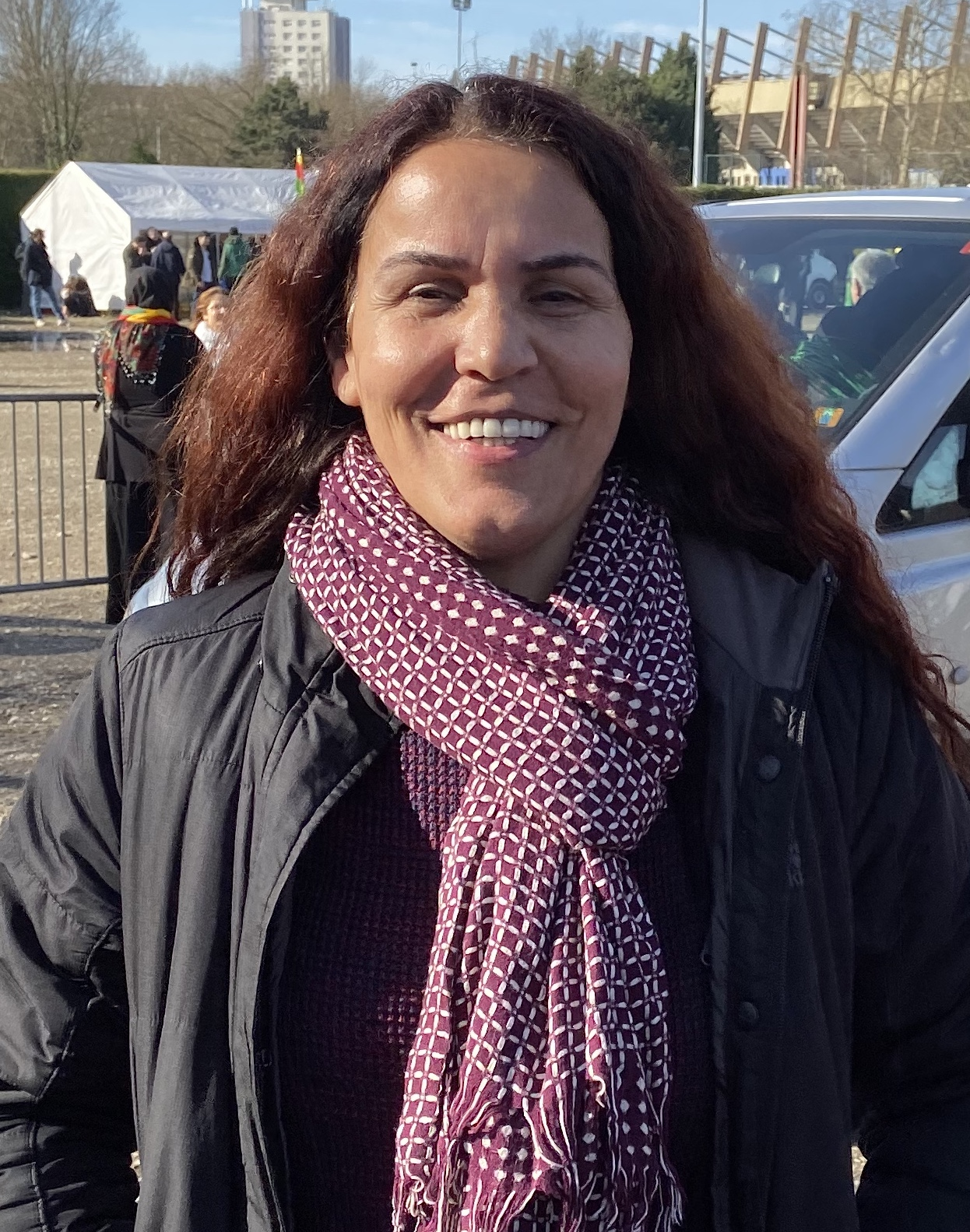
Besime Konca

Besime Konca (born 1970, Maras) is a Kurdish politician of the Peoples' Democratic Party.

She was detained from 1993 to 2004 for political activities and again from 2009 to 2014 within the KCK main case. At the general elections of 1 November 2015 she was elected as an MP for Siirt.

She was arrested on 13 December 2016 and was released on probation on 3 May 2017.

Konca was imprisoned on 29 May 2017 again but was released on 28 July 2017. In July 2017 a court in Gaziantep confirmed another sentence of two and a half years against Konca for being a member of an armed organization and spreading propaganda for a terror organization. Following, she was relieved of her rights and duties as an MP. After the renewed sentence she left Turkey and went to live in exile to Europe. The State Prosecutor at the Court of Cassation in Turkey Bekir Şahin filed a lawsuit before the Constitutional Court on the 17 March 2021, demanding for Konca and 686 other HDP politicians a five-year ban to engage in politics.
