= Behçet Yıldırım =

Turkish politician

Member of the Grand National Assembly
- In office 7 June 2015 – 1 November 2015
- Constituency: Adıyaman, (June 2015
- In office 1 November 2015 – 24 June 2018
- Constituency: Adıyaman (Nov 2015)

Personal details
- Born: 10 May 1959 (age 67) Adıyaman, Turkey
- Party: Peoples' Democratic Party (HDP)
- Education: Çukurova University
- Occupation: Politician
- Profession: Medical doctor

Behçet Yıldırım (born 10 May 1959) is a Turkish politician from the Peoples' Democratic Party (HDP), who has served as a Member of Parliament for Adıyaman.

Born in Adıyaman, he graduated from Çukurova University Faculty of Medicine and worked at an Adıyaman hospital for maternity and children. He was a member of the Human Rights Foundation and served as the Democratic Society Congress delegate for Adıyaman. He was elected as a Member of Parliament in the June 2015 general election, and re-elected in November 2015 general election.

== See also ==
- 25th Parliament of Turkey
