= İbrahim Turhan =

Turkish CEO and politician

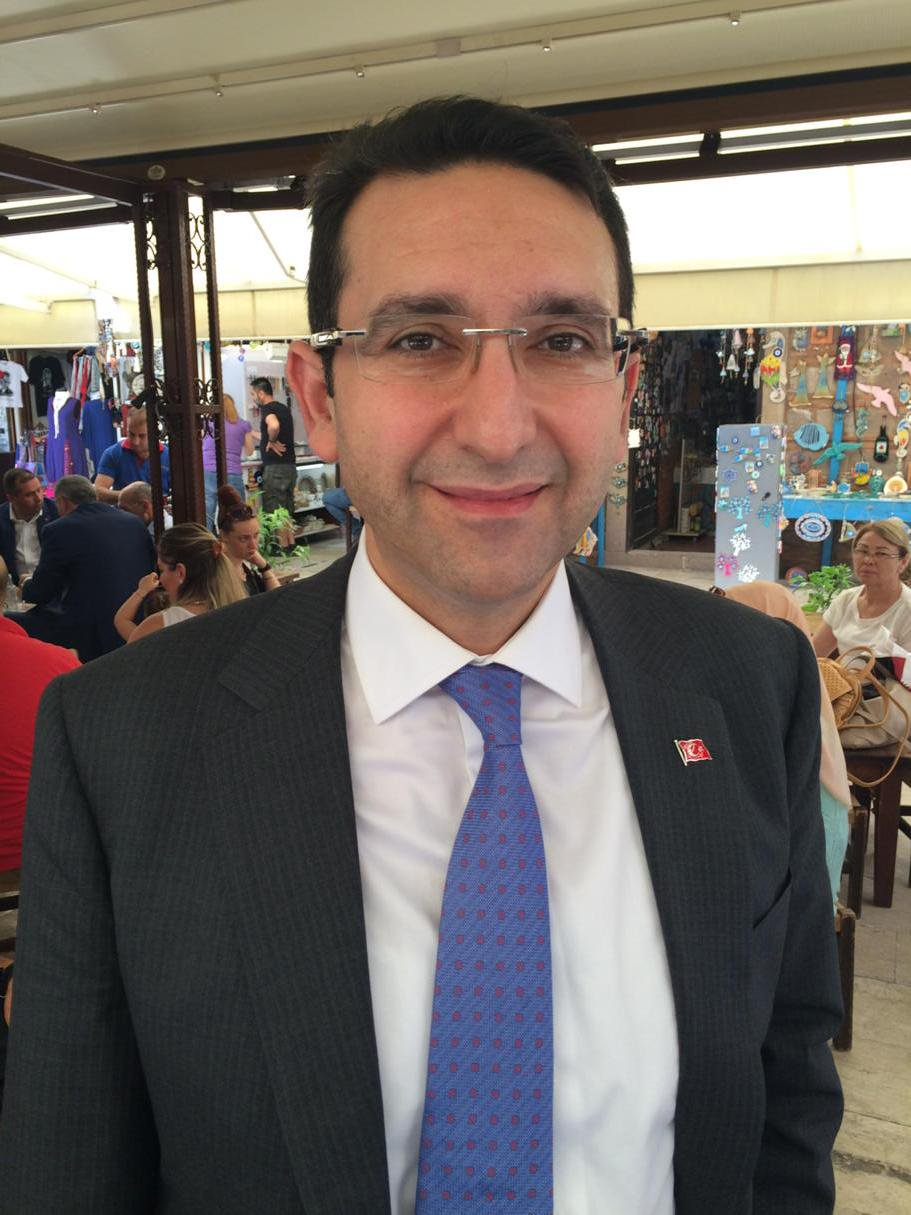
Turhan in May 2015

İbrahim Turhan was the chairman and CEO of the Istanbul Stock Exchange from 2012 to 2015 and a Member of the Turkish parliament for the governing Justice and Development Party from 2015 to 2018.

== Biography ==
Turhan was born in İzmir in 1968. He graduated from Lycée de Galatasaray in 1987 and was admitted to Boğaziçi University, Faculty of Economic and Administrative Sciences, Department of Management.

He earned his Master of Arts degree from Marmara University Banking and Insurance Institute with a thesis on “Macroeconomic Consequences of Public Deficit and its Effects on the Turkish Banking Sector”, and his Ph.D. degree on banking with a thesis entitled “Financial Crises and Their Effects on the Real Sector: The Case of Turkey”.H e worked as member of staff with Marmara University during his doctorate studies. İbrahim M. Turhan, Ph.D., was awarded the title “associate professor” by the Inter University Council on January 28, 2014.

== Academic work ==
Supported by the Marmara University Research Fund, Turhan was invited to University of Geneva Institute Européen (IEUG) and Loughborough University Banking Centre where he worked as research fellow.

He joined Yeditepe University as associate professor in 2001, where he chaired the Banking and Insurance Department and International Trade and Management Department, and also chaired The School of Applied Disciplines and School of Foreign Languages of Yeditepe University.

Turhan lectured on international financial markets and organizations, strategic planning and management in financial institutions, banking theory and policy and central bank management in various universities including İstanbul Bilgi, Marmara, İstanbul Ticaret and Kadir Has. He also worked as part-time member of staff with Beykent University Faculty of Economic and Administrative Sciences until 2004.

In addition to his publications on financial economics and economy politics, Mr. Turhan also worked as consultant, editor and editor-in-chief with periodicals on banking, finance and finance technologies.

Turhan is a member of the Leaders Group and Business Advisory Board of the Kiel Institute Global Economic Symposium and has published articles in international refereed journals on the Turkish economy, financial economy and economy politics.

== Political career ==
Turhan became a member of parliament for Tayyip Erdogan's governing AK Party in 2015. He left this position in July 2018.
He was one of the founders of the newly founded Future Party.
