= Mehmet Parsak =

Turkish politician (born 1979)

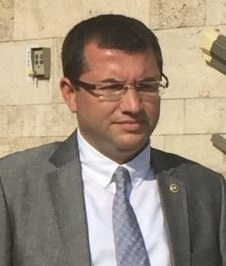

Member of the Grand National Assembly
- In office 7 June 2015 – 7 July 2018
- Constituency: Afyonkarahisar (June 2015, Nov 2015)

Personal details
- Born: March 3, 1979 (age 47) Afyonkarahisar, Turkey
- Party: Nationalist Movement Party (MHP)
- Education: Selçuk University
- Occupation: Politician

Mehmet Parsak (born 3 March 1979) is a Turkish politician from the Nationalist Movement Party (MHP), who has served as a Member of Parliament for Afyonkarahisar from 2015 to 2018.

== Early life and career ==
Mehmet Parsak was born on 3 March 1979 in Afyonkarahisar and graduated from high school there in 1998. He graduated from Selçuk University Faculty of Law. He became a lawyer in Ankara in 2002 and worked in the Turkish Law Institute in 2004. He completed his master's degree at Gazi University and became the President of the Afyonkarahisar and Districts Solidarity Association in 2009.

== Political career ==
Parsak had been involved in the Grey Wolves, the youth wing of the Nationalist Movement Party (MHP), during his student years. He also attended the first term of the MHP Politics and Leadership School in 2009. He formed the MHP legal action group in 2011. In 2012, he was elected to the MHP Central Executive Committee and was re-elected in the 11th Nationalist Movement Party Ordinary Congress in 2015. He was elected as a Member of Parliament for Afyonkarahisar in the June 2015 general election.

== See also ==
- 25th Parliament of Turkey
