= İbrahim Halil Fırat =

Turkish politician (born 1973)

İbrahim Halil Fırat MP

Member of the Grand National Assembly
- Incumbent
- Assumed office 7 June 2015
- Constituency: Adıyaman (June 2015, Nov 2015, 2018)

Personal details
- Born: 1 January 1973 (age 53) Adıyaman, Turkey
- Party: Justice and Development Party (AKP)
- Education: Marmara University
- Occupation: Politician
- Profession: Lawyer

İbrahim Halil Fırat (born 1 January 1973) is a Turkish politician from the Justice and Development Party (AKP), who has served as a Member of Parliament for Adıyaman since 7 June 2015.

Born in Adıyaman, he graduated from Marmara University Faculty of Law and worked as a freelance lawyer for 12 years. He joined the AKP Adıyaman branch after the party's establishment in 2001, becoming a disciplinary and executive board member, eventually becoming the AKP Adıyaman branch president in 2011. He served as the branch president until December 2014, after which he was elected as an AKP Member of Parliament in the June 2015 general election.

== See also ==
- 25th Parliament of Turkey
