= Vedat Demiröz =

Turkish politician

Vedat Demiröz (born 1956, Bitlis, Turkey) is a Turkish politician for the Justice and Development Party in Turkey and a member of Turkish Parliament.
