= Eren Erdem =

Turkish politician

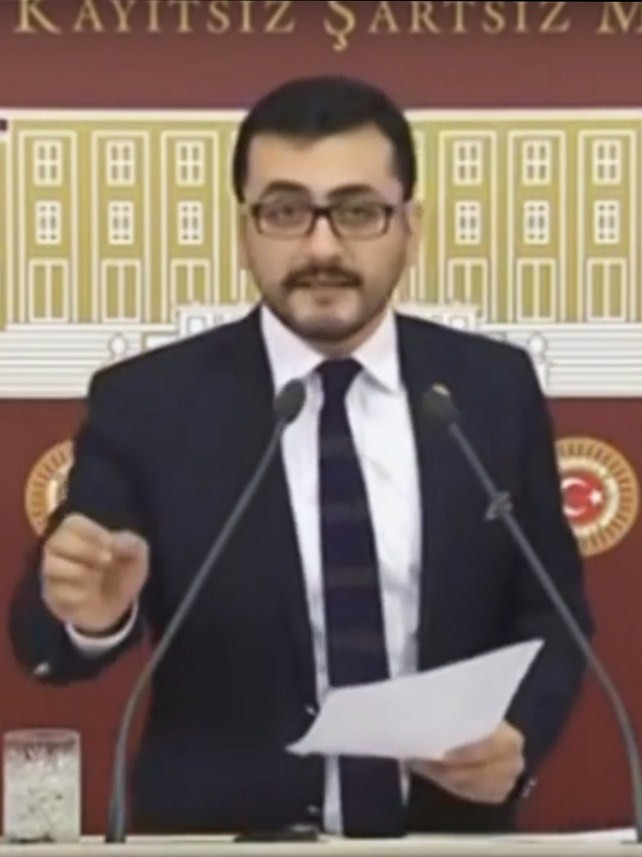

Member of the Grand National Assembly
- Incumbent
- Assumed office 7 June 2015
- Constituency: İstanbul (June 2015, Nov 2015)

Personal details
- Born: August 14, 1986 (age 39) Istanbul, Turkey
- Party: Republican People's Party

Eren Erdem (born 14 August 1986) is a Turkish writer and politician from the Republican People's Party (CHP), who has served as a Member of Parliament for İstanbul since 7 June 2015.

== Biography ==
Eren Erdem was born in Fatih, İstanbul on 14 August 1986 to Hasan Erdem and his wife Hüsniye. He completed his primary and secondary education in İstanbul. During his youth, he worked as an auxiliary staff to make extra money. He wrote eight books:

- Gayya Karanlığından Kur’an Aydınlığına, Abdestli Kapitalizm
- Nurjuvazi
- Şeytan Evliyaları
- Selman-ı Pak
- İslam ve Kapitalizm
- Riya Tabirleri, Devrim Ayetleri

Erdem was elected as a Republican People's Party (CHP) Member of Parliament for Istanbul in the June 2015 general election. He was re-elected in November 2015. He is married with one child and can speak English at a fluent level.

Erdem leaked a number of documents from Turkish government surveillance of ISIL-members. The documents are said to show detailed information about activities and locations of ISIL-members, but also a lack of action on part of the Turkish government. Erdem has alleged a cover-up by the Turkish government, which is implicated in having poor control of the Turkish-Syrian border. Erdem also claims that sarin gas was transported through Turkey to anti-government rebels in Syria, where it was used in the 2013 Ghouta chemical attack, and ISIL attacks against civilians. Erdem showed before the parliament a case where investigations leading to the arrest of 13 potential Turkish ISIL-members were made, but later inexplicably dropped. The leaks are also said to implicate that Erdogan's immediate family in his son-in-law, Berat Albayrak, made financial gain through oil-deals with ISIL-members.

The material was released through an interview with the English-language Russian news-service Russia Today, and has been said to promote Russian anti-AK Party and anti-Erdogan sentiment. Erdem faces treason charges in Turkey for his leaks. A trial was also directed to two journalists who reported on the story, but it has since been dropped.

=== 2018: new arrest ===
In June, 2018, he was arrested again, charged with issues which include his role as an editor-in-chief of the Karşı newspaper, the revealing the identity of a secret witness and his alleged support for the Gülen movement.

A court in Istanbul freed him on January 7, 2019, but he was immediately rearrested. In February 2019, it was reported that Erdem was on hunger strike. On October 31, the Istanbul Public Prosecutor's office ordered that Erdem be released.
