= Barış Yarkadaş =

Turkish politician

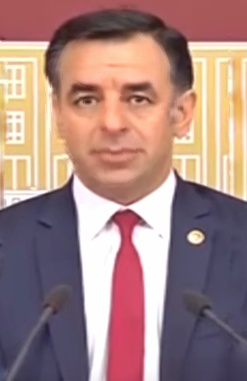

Member of the Turkish Parliament for İstanbul
- In office June 2015 – June 2018
- Majority: Justice and Development Party (Turkey)

Personal details
- Born: August 2, 1974 (age 51) Susuz, Kars, Turkey
- Party: Republican People's Party
- Occupation: Journalist, politician, writer
- Website: Official website

Barış Yarkadaş (born 2 August 1974) is a Turkish journalist, politician and a writer. He's a member and lawmaker of the Republican People's Party and an ex member of parliament representing a division in the first electoral district of Istanbul.

== Personal life ==
Baris Yarkadas, son of Zülfiye and Rasim Yarkadaş, was born on 2 August 1974 in Susuz, Kars. Yarkadaş moved to Istanbul in 1988 and graduated from Anadolu University. He entered into journalism during his university years and then worked in many television programs as a journalist. He is also a member of the Turkish Journalists' Association.

== Politics ==
Yarkadas won two consecutive elections in June 2015 and November 2015 (snap election) as a member of parliament of a division in the first electoral district of Istanbul.

== Publications ==
- Hepsi Yaralar Sonuncusu Öldürür (2004) ISBN 9-7562-0703-5
- Aksaray'ın Sırları (2015) ISBN 978-6-0565-4806-2
