= Ahmet Berat Çonkar =

Turkish politician

Ahmet Berat Çonkar (born 13 August 1976, Ankara, Turkey) is a Turkish politician for the Justice and Development Party in Turkey and Deputy of Istanbul.
