= Zeynel Emre =

Turkish politician (born 1981)

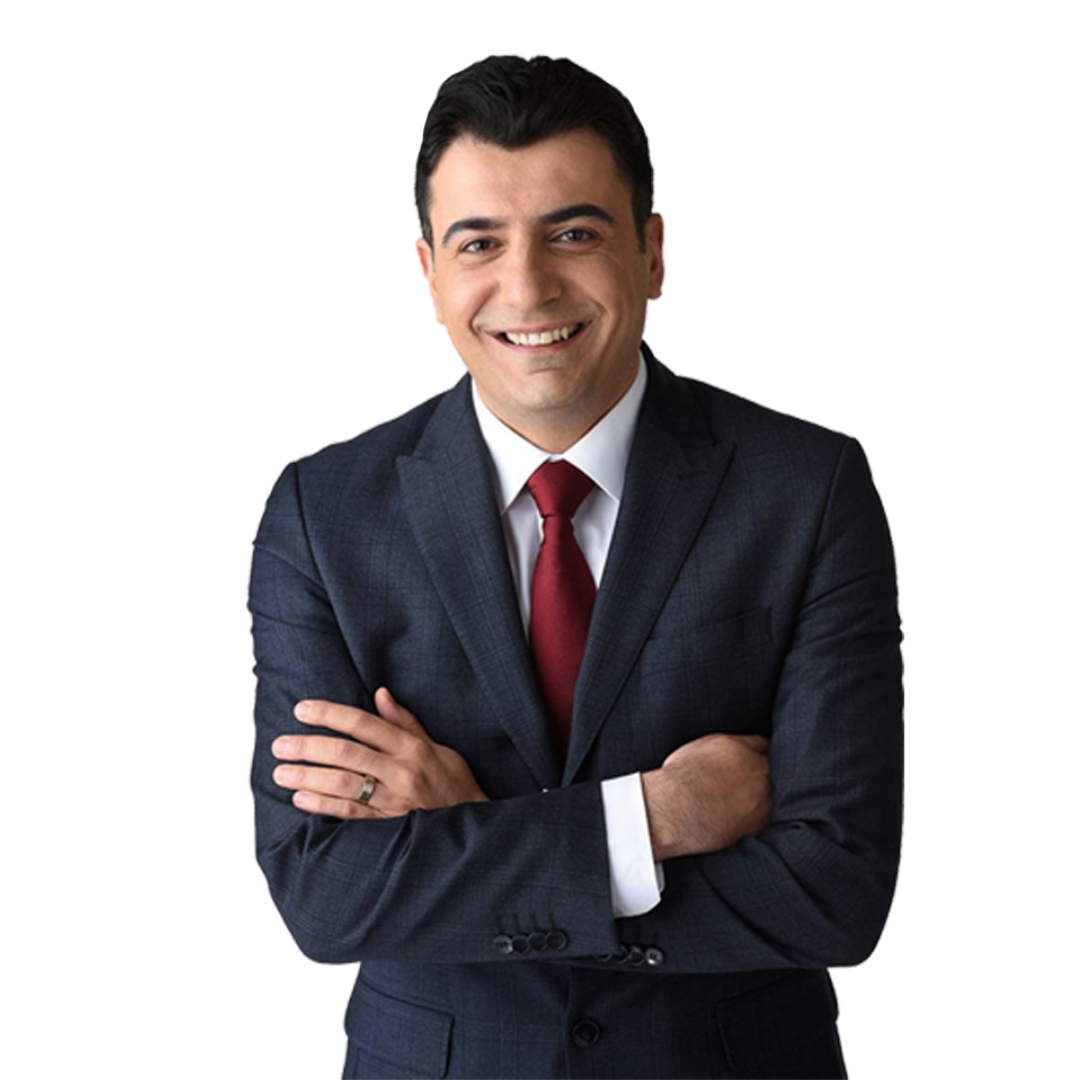
- Emre in 2020

Member of the Grand National Assembly
- Incumbent
- Assumed office 23 June 2015
- Constituency: Istanbul

Personal details
- Born: 27 April 1981 (age 45)
- Party: New Party (since 2026)

Zeynel Emre (born 27 April 1981) is a Turkish politician serving as a member of the Grand National Assembly.

== Politician career ==
He served as Deputy of Istanbul's 3rd electoral district for the Republican People's Party (CHP) from 2015.

=== New Party ===
In July 2026, he transferred to the New Party (YP) following its establishment. He was elected to the ten-seat Central Executive Board, and was appointed party spokesperson.
