= Mustafa Köse =

Turkish lawyer and politician

Mustafa Köse (born 27 June 1977 in Istanbul, Turkey) is a Turkish lawyer and politician and member of Turkish Parliament, also Member of Justice and development party in Turkey and deputy in the Turkish Parliament for Antalya
