= Hüda Kaya =

Turkish politician

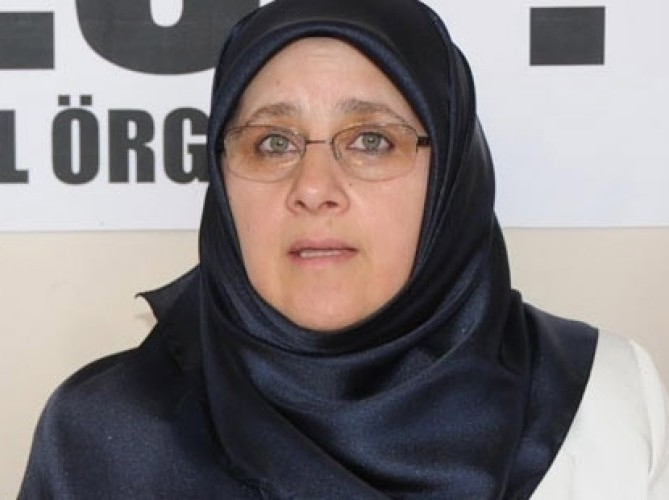

Member of the Grand National Assembly
- In office 7 June 2015 – 3 June 2023
- Constituency: Istanbul (I) (June 2015, Nov 2015); Istanbul (II) (2018)

Personal details
- Born: 9 October 1960 (age 65) Istanbul, Turkey
- Party: People's Democratic Party (HDP)

Hüda Kaya (born 9 October 1960 in Istanbul) is a Turkish journalist, writer, activist and politician of the Peoples' Democratic Party (HDP). Since June 2015 she has been member of the Turkish parliament, representing her Istanbul constituency.

Following her parents' divorce, Kaya was raised by her Turkish nationalist father and her stepmother, while she didn't meet her biologic mother until the age of 45. She professed Islam and subsequently married her husband of Iraqi background, giving birth to three daughters and a son. With time she wanted to divorce and she moved from Istanbul to Malatya, where she owned a small shop, and worked as a journalist for local radio and newspapers.

At the core of her political activism, Kaya fought against the headscarf ban which she considered against the free will of a woman. In 1998 Kaya went to prison for 2 years, condemned for taking part in a protest against the headscarf ban and an article she has written. Between 1998 and 2003 she was imprisoned several times and she served 3 years in prison. Due to juridical difficulties she decided to leave Turkey for Pakistan, but returned one year later.

Following her work for pro-Kurdish newspaper Özgür Gündem she joined the left-leaning Peoples' Democratic Party (HDP) and was elected member of the Turkish parliament, representing her Istanbul constituency in the June 2015 general election. She was confirmed in the November 2015 snap-election and the 2018 general election. The State Prosecutor at the Court of Cassation in Turkey Bekir Şahin filed a lawsuit before the Constitutional Court on the 17 March 2021, demanding for Kaya and 686 other HDP politicians a five-year ban for political activities. The lawsuit was filed together with the request for the HDP to be shut down due to the parties alleged organizational links with the PKK.
