= Nurettin Yaşar =

Turkish politician (born 1961)

Nurettin Yaşar MP

Member of the Grand National Assembly
- Incumbent
- Assumed office 7 June 2015
- Constituency: Malatya (June 2015, Nov 2015)

Personal details
- Born: March 2, 1961 (age 65) Malatya, Turkey
- Party: Justice and Development Party (AKP)
- Children: 4
- Education: Istanbul University
- Occupation: Politician

Nurettin Yaşar (born 2 March 1961) is a Turkish politician from the Justice and Development Party (AKP), who has served as a Member of parliament for Malatya since 7 June 2015.

== Early life and career ==
Nurettin Yaşar was born in Malatya on 2 March 1961 to Hasan Yaşar and his wife Hatun. He completed his primary, secondary and high school education in Malatya. He graduated from Istanbul University Faculty of Law and worked as a freelance lawyer for six years. Yaşar is married with four children.

== Political career ==
=== Member of Parliament ===
Yaşar entered politics through the ruling Justice and Development Party (AKP), and was elected into the Grand National Assembly of Turkey in the June 2015 general election as an MP from Malatya Province. He was re-elected in November 2015.
