= Mustafa Şahin =

Turkish politician

- Born: February 3, 1956 (age 70); Malatya, Turkey
- Occupation: Politician

Mustafa Şahin (born 3 February 1956) is a Turkish politician from the Justice and Development Party (AK Party) who has served as a Member of Parliament for Malatya since 12 June 2011.

== Early life and education ==
Mustafa Şahin was born in the village of Toygar in the province of Malatya Province as the son of Faik and Besime Şahin. He completed his primary, secondary, and high school education in Malatya. Şahin graduated from İnönü University. He is married with five children and can speak English at a semi-fluent level.

Şahin was elected as an AK Party Member of Parliament for Malatya in the 2011 general election. He was re-elected in June 2015 and November 2015.
