= Salih Çetinkaya =

Turkish politician (born 1972)

Salih Çetinkaya (born 1 January 1972), is a Turkish politician from the Justice and Development Party (AK Party), who has served as a Member of Parliament for Kırşehir since 7 June 2015.

== Early life and career ==
Salih Çetinkaya was born on 1 January 1972 in Kırşehir as the son of Kadir, a teacher, and his wife İlknur. After completing his primary, secondary and high school education in different parts of Anatolia, he graduated from Marmara University faculty of law in 1996. Çetinkaya has been a freelance lawyer since 1999. He is married with two children and speaks English at a semi-fluent level.

=== Early political career ===
On 14 August 2001, Çetinkaya became the Justice and Development Party's (AK Party) Kırşehir charter member.

== Member of parliament ==
Salih Çetinkaya was elected as an AK Party Member of Parliament for Kırşehir in the June 2015 general election. He was re-elected in November 2015.

== See also ==
- 26th Parliament of Turkey
