= Ahmet Eşref Fakıbaba =

Turkish doctor and politician

Mayor of Urfa
- In office 28 March 2004 – 30 March 2014

Minister of Agriculture and Forestry
- In office July 19, 2017 – July 10, 2018

Member of the Grand National Assembly
- Incumbent
- Assumed office June 2, 2023
- In office June 23, 2015 – October 26, 2022

Personal details
- Born: December 16, 1951 (age 74) Birecik, Turkey
- Party: Independent (2009, 2026-present)
- Other political affiliations: Justice and Development Party (2004-2009, 2013-2022); Good Party (2022-2026); Felicity Party (2009-2013)
- Occupation: Politician, doctor

Ahmet Eşref Fakıbaba (born December 16, 1951, Birecik, Turkey) is a Turkish doctor and politician. He is the former mayor and deputy of Şanlıurfa. He served as the Minister of Agriculture and Forestry between 2017 and 2018.

== Political career ==
He was elected as the Mayor of Şanlıurfa in the 2004 local elections as a candidate of the AK Party. Before the 2009 local elections, he was not nominated although he ranked first in his party's opinion poll.

Fakıbaba resigned from the party in January 2009 after he was not nominated and announced that he would run as an independent candidate in the elections. The Felicity Party gave open support to Fakıbaba's candidacy. In the elections held on March 29, 2009, Fakıbaba won 44 percent of the votes and was re-elected as the mayor of Şanlıurfa. The following year, he joined the Felicity Party. Şanlıurfa was elevated to "metropolitan" status at the end of 2012.

He left the Felicity Party, citing Numan Kurtulmuş's departure from the party, and rejoined the AK Party on January 22, 2013. He did not run again in the 2014 local elections and resigned as Mayor of Şanlıurfa after ten years in office.

He was elected as Şanlıurfa deputy from the AK Party in the June 2015 elections and again four months later. In the 2018 general elections, his party's vote dropped from 64 percent to 52 percent, but he managed to be re-elected as an MP. Between 2017 and 2018, he served as Minister of Agriculture and Forestry.

On October 20, 2022, he announced that he resigned from both his AK Party membership and his parliamentary seat. On October 26, 2022, he officially joined the İYİ Party.

In the 2023 Turkish general elections, İYİ Party was elected as Ankara deputy.

On October 21, 2026, he announced that he resigned from both his İYİ Party membership and his parliamentary seat. As of November 11, 2026, his resignation from his seat in the Grand National Assembly of Turkey had not been approved by the General Assembly of the Grand National Assembly of Turkey.
