= Erkan Kandemir =

Turkish politician (born 1981)

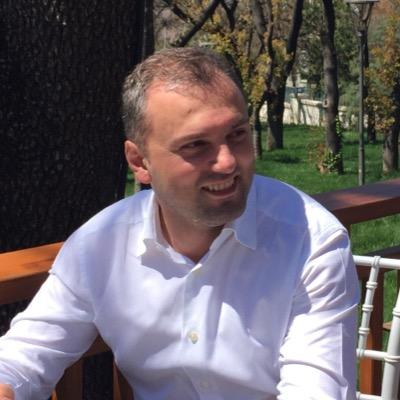
- Kandemir in 2016

Member of the Grand National Assembly
- Incumbent
- Assumed office 23 June 2015
- Constituency: Istanbul (I)

Personal details
- Born: 2 September 1981 (age 45)
- Party: Justice and Development Party

Erkan Kandemir (born 2 September 1981) is a Turkish politician serving as a member of the Grand National Assembly since 2015. From 2014 to 2015, he served as deputy minister of health.
