= Hülya Nergis =

Turkish politician and lawyer

Hülya Nergis (born 1967 in Kayseri, Turkey) is a Turkish politician and lawyer, and a member of the Turkish Parliament for the Justice and Development Party
