= Sena Nur Çelik =

Turkish politician (born 1986)

Sena Nur Çelik MP
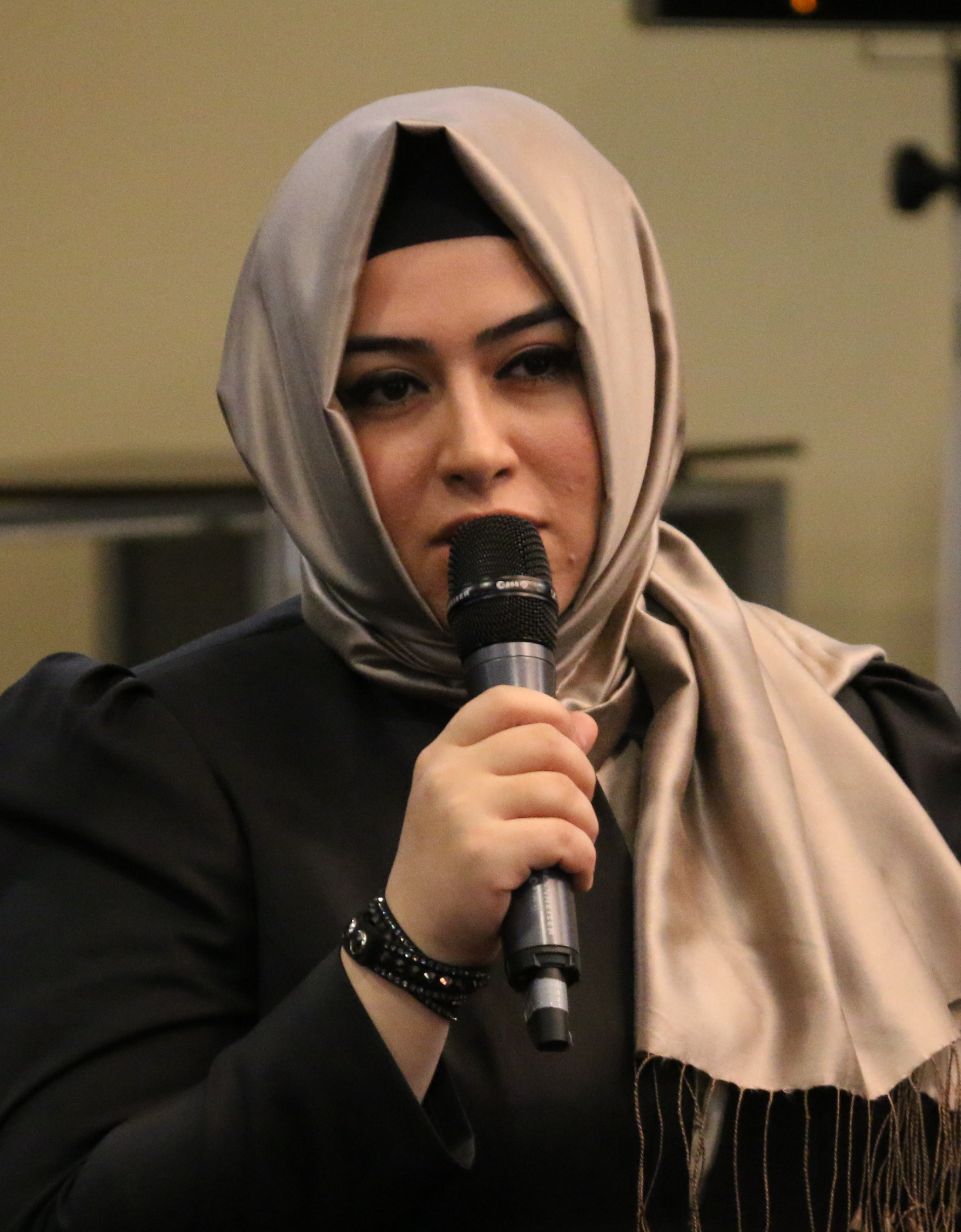

Member of the Grand National Assembly
- Incumbent
- Assumed office 23 June 2015
- Constituency: Antalya (June 2015, Nov 2015, 2018); Istanbul (II) (2023)

Personal details
- Born: 15 August 1986 (age 39) Alanya, Antalya, Turkey
- Citizenship: Turkey
- Party: Justice and Development Party
- Spouse: Kılıç Buğra Kanat (m. 2024)
- Education: University of Warwick; Istanbul University; London School of Economics
- Occupation: Jurist, politician

Sena Nur Çelik (born 5 August 1986, Alanya) is a Turkish politician and member of the Turkish Parliament for the Justice and Development Party.

== Biography ==
She was born in 1986 in Alanya, Antalya Province. In 2004, after graduating from Üsküdar American High School, she went to England to study law. She graduated from Warwick University Faculty of Law. While she was a student at Warwick University, she became the International Student Representative.

She completed the equivalency program of Istanbul University Faculty of Law and completed his master's degree in International Trade Law at the London School of Economics. She served as a Board Member of the Turkish Student Group at the London School of Economics.

Since 2011, he worked in an international law firm. She provided legal and consultancy services on major infrastructure projects, mergers and acquisitions, strategic partnership and restructuring projects.

She was elected as AK Party Antalya deputy in June 2015, November 2015 and 2018 general elections. She served as the spokesperson of the Foreign Affairs Commission in the Grand National Assembly of Turkey (TBMM). In the 2023 general elections, she ran as a candidate from Istanbul and entered the 28th term of the Turkish Grand National Assembly as an AK Party Istanbul MP.
