= Mustafa Tuncer =

Turkish politician (born 1971)

Mustafa Tuncer MP

Member of the Grand National Assembly
- In office 7 June 2015 – 14 May 2023
- Constituency: Amasya (June 2015, Nov 2015, 2023)

Personal details
- Party: Republican People's Party (CHP) (2015-2018); Good Party (2018-present)
- Education: Istanbul University
- Occupation: Freelance lawyer, politician

Mustafa Tuncer (born 31 October 1971) is a Turkish politician from the Republican People's Party (CHP), who served as a Member of Parliament for Amasya from 2015 to 2023. Before entering politics, Tuncer worked as a freelance lawyer.

== Early years and career ==
Mustafa Tuncer was born on 31 October 1971 in Merzifon, Amasya to Hüseyin Tuncer, a farmer, and his wife Gülbahar, a housewife. He completed his primary, secondary, and high-school education in Amasya. He graduated from Istanbul University Faculty of Law. Tuncer has been a Freelance Lawyer in Mezrifon since June 1996. Between 2009 and 2012, Tuncer was an academic at the Merzifon Police School. Since 1997, he is member of the Atatürkist Thought Association (ADD), a secular organization that espouses the ideas of Mustafa Kemal, the founder of modern Turkey. Married with two children, Mustafa Tuncer speaks semi-fluent French.

== Political life ==
Tuncer began his political career in the Republican People's Party (CHP) in 1999, first as a member of the party's youth wing. He served in several different positions, before resigning to contest a seat in the Grand National Assembly of Turkey (TBMM) in the forthcoming general election. Tuncer was elected as a CHP Member of Parliament for Amasya in the June 2015 general election. He was re-elected in and November 2015.

Tuncer was one of 15 CHP deputies to join the Good Party on 21 April 2018.
