= Mehmet Günal =

Turkish economist and politician

Deputy Chairman of the Nationalist Movement Party
- Incumbent
- Assumed office 11 May 2016
- Preceded by: Ümit Özdağ

Personal details
- Born: October 7, 1964 (age 61) Manavgat, Antalya, Turkey

Mehmet Günal (born 7 October 1964) is a Turkish economist and politician, who serves as the Deputy Leader of the Nationalist Movement Party (MHP) responsible for Turkish world and International relations since 11 May 2016. He has served as a Member of Parliament for Antalya from 2007 to 2018.

Günal is a graduate of Ankara University. Before entering politics, he worked as an expert at the Central Bank of the Republic of Turkey. Married and able to speak semi-fluent English, he wrote five economy books.
