= Burcu Çelik Özkan =

Turkish politician (born 1986)

Burcu Çelik Özkan MP
- Born: 1 January 1986 (age 40); Muş, Turkey
- Citizenship: Turkish
- Education: Marmara University
- Title: Member of Parliament
- Political party: Peoples' Democratic Party

Burcu Çelik Özkan (born 1 January 1986, Muş) is a former member of the Turkish parliament for the Peoples' Democratic Party (HDP).

== Education and professional career ==
Burcu Çelik Özkan has a law degree from the Marmara University. After she worked as a lawyer and was involved in the Libertarian Jurists Platform.

== Political career ==
Özkan was active in the local HDP branch of Beylikdüzü before being elected into parliament. Özkan was elected as an MP for Muş in the general elections in June 2015 and again in the snap elections in November 2015. During her term she was a defender of LGBT rights

== Prosecution ==
Özkan was arrested in April 2017. She was condemned to 6 years imprisonment in a first trial for "committing crimes on behalf of an illegal organization without being a member", a sentence she appealed. In October 2017 the sentence was overturned and in February 2018 a new trial was ordered to take place. On 10 April 2018, an appeal court in Turkey handed opposition MP Burcu Çelik Özkan a sentence of more than seven years in prison for terrorism propaganda. On the 6 October 2019 the verdict was overruled by the court of cassation and she was subsequently released.
