= Emre Köprülü =

Turkish politician (born 1981)

Emre Köprülü MP

Member of the Grand National Assembly
- Incumbent
- Assumed office 12 June 2011
- Constituency: Tekirdağ (2011, June 2015, Nov 2015)

Personal details
- Born: May 26, 1981 (age 44) Çorlu, Tekirdağ, Turkey
- Party: Republican People's Party
- Education: Law
- Alma mater: Marmara University

Emre Köprülü (born 26 May 1981) is a Turkish politician from the Republican People's Party (CHP), who has served as a Member of Parliament for Tekirdağ since 12 June 2011.

== Early life and career ==
Emre Köprülü was born in Çorlu, Tekirdağ Province on 26 May 1981 to Cengiz Köprülü and his wife Hamiyet. He graduated from the Law Faculty of Marmara University. Köprülü worked as a freelance lawyer in Çorlu, before being elected as a CHP Member of Parliament for Tekirdağ during the 2011 general election. He is married to Elçin Köprülü.

== Political career ==
=== Member of parliament ===
He joined the Republican People's Party (CHP). Köprülü was elected as a CHP Member of Parliament for Tekirdağ in the 2011 general election. He was re-elected in June 2015 and November 2015.
