= Mizgin Irgat =

Kurdish lawyer and politician

Member of the Grand National Assembly of Turkey
- In office June 2015 – June 2018

Personal details
- Born: 1978 (age 47–48) Tatvan
- Party: HDP
- Education: Dicle University

Mizgin Irgat (born 1978 in Tatvan, Turkey) is a Kurdish lawyer and politician. She is a member of the Peoples' Democratic Party (HDP) and a former member of the Grand National Assembly of Turkey.

== Early life and education ==
She attended primary education in Tatvan, but was exiled to Izmir in 1993 where she completed her studies in a local high school. After having graduated from the law faculty of the Dicle University in Diyarbakir in 2003, she became a lawyer in Izmir. In December 2011 she was arrested and prosecuted in one of the so-called KCK-trials, the one against the lawyers of Abdullah Öcalan. She was detained in prison in Bakirköy, Istanbul. For the release of these lawyers, several Human Rights organizations such as the International Federation of Human Rights (FIDH) the World Organization Against Torture (OMCT) and lawyer unions have taken action. She was released pending trial in June 2013.

== Political career ==
She was the Democratic Society Party (DTP) candidate for the mayorship of Konak in Izmir in 2009 but was not elected. In the General Elections of June 2015, Irgat was elected to the Grand National Assembly of Turkey representing the HDP for Bitlis. In the snap elections of November 2015, she was re-elected. As an MP she has taken up the defense of the rights of the deceased, condemning the destruction of graveyards by Turkish authorities.

=== Legal prosecution ===
While acting as an MP, she was detained and prosecuted. She has taken part in a meeting of HDP MPs in Izmir during which on actions of the PKK were referred to as peoples' struggle, which was enough evidence for a prosecution for terror related charges of several MPs. Irgat also shall have referred to Öcalan as a captive and a political entity. On the 17 March 2021, the state prosecutor Bekir Şahin demanded for her and 686 other HDP politicians a five-year ban to engage in politics together with a closure of the HDP due to alleged organizational cooperation with the PKK.
