= Nihat Akdoğan =

Turkish politician

Member of the Grand National Assembly of Turkey
- In office June 2015 – June 2018
- Constituency: Hakkari

Personal details
- Born: 9 March 1980 (age 46) Hakkari, Turkey
- Party: Peoples' Democratic Party
- Education: Anadolu University

Nihat Akdoğan (born 9 March 1980 in Hakkâri, Turkey) is a Turkish politician of Kurdish descent. He was a politician of the Democratic Society Party (DTP) and a member of the Grand National Assembly of Turkey for the Peoples' Democratic Party (HDP).

== Education ==
Akdoğan was born in Hakkari, where he attended high school. Later he graduated from Anadolu University in Eskişehir in Public Administration

== Political career ==
He was involved in the DTP. In the parliamentary elections of June and the snap election in November 2015 he was elected as an MP representing the HDP for Hakkari. He was arrested on the 7 November 2016 in Hakkari, and was transferred to the Silivri prison in Istanbul where he was held in solitary confinement. His arrest caused some controversy as Deputy Prime Minister Numan Kurtulmuş reported his "capture" at the entrance of Hakkari, while Akdoğan responded that he was arrested in the city centre, which was about 80 km from the location he shall have been captured. He was released in April 2017. For the electoral campaign towards the parliamentary elections in 2018, Akdoğan was a member of a HDP delegation which toured Iraqi Kurdistan demanding the support from the local Kurdish population. In the local elections of March 2019, he was a candidate for Sultanbeyli in Istanbul, but not elected.
