= Mustafa Mit =

Turkish politician

Mustafa Mit (born 1 January 1950) is a Turkish politician from the Nationalist Movement Party (MHP), who served as a Member of Parliament for Ankara's second electoral district from 2015 to 2018.

== Biography ==
Mustafa Mit was born in Şarkışla, Sivas Province. He completed his primary, secondary and high school education in different parts of Anatolia before graduating from Gazi University Faculty of economics and administrative sciences.
