= İsmet Uçma =

Turkish politician (1955–2021)

İsmet Uçma (1 January 1955 – 11 October 2021) was a Turkish politician and member of the Turkish Parliament. Uçma was a member of the Justice and Development Party and an MP for Istanbul. He died on 11 October 2021 due to lung cancer.

== See also ==
- List of members of the Grand National Assembly of Turkey who died in office
