= Mehmet Ali Aslan =

Turkish politician

Member of the Grand National Assembly
- In office 7 June 2015 – 23 June 2018
- Constituency: Mardin (June 2015; Batman (November 2015)

Personal details
- Born: 1975 (age 50–51) Silvan, Diyarbakır Province, Turkey
- Party: People's Democratic Party (HDP)
- Profession: Sports teacher

Mehmet Ali Aslan (born 1975 in Silvan, Diyarbakır Province, Turkey) is a Turkish politician of Mhallami descent and the founding chairman of the ethnic group's first organization, the Mhallami Association.

Born in Silvan, Diyarbakır Province, Aslan grew up in Mercimekli in Midyat. Since 2002, he has been working as a sports teacher in Midyat.

Aslan contested the June 2015 general election as a list candidate for the Peoples' Democratic Party (HDP). Placed 4th representing Mardin, Aslan was elected to become the first Mhallami member of the Turkish Parliament. As he committed his oath of office to the "peoples of Turkey" rather than "the Turkish people," he was called out for allegedly having Armenian roots. Aslan however denied "any connection with Armenians. If I had, I would be proud of it."

In the November snap election, he was placed 2nd on the HDP's list in the neighboring Batman province and was reelected to parliament.
