= Bülent Turan =

Turkish politician (born 1975)

Bülent Turan (born 17 January 1975 in Çanakkale, Turkey) is a Turkish politician, who currently serves as a member of the Turkish Parliament for the Justice and Development Party.
