= Ravza Kavakçı Kan =

Turkish politician

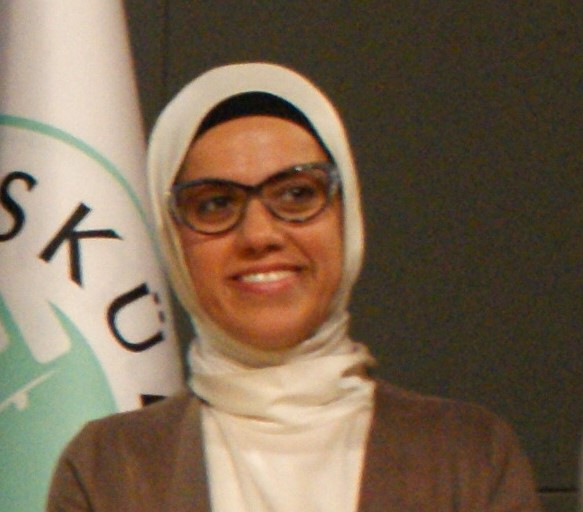
- Born: 30 March 1972 (age 54); Istanbul, Turkey
- Education: M.A. from Boğaziçi University PhD from Howard University
- Occupation: Professor
- Employer: Hasan Kalyoncu University Uskudar University

Ravza Kavakçı Kan is a Turkish politician, elected as the President of the Turkish Inter-Parliamentary Union Group for the 27th legislative term of Grand National Assembly of Turkey and is a member of the Committee on Digital Platforms that is newly established.

She holds a Ph.D in political science from Howard University in Washington, DC (2013). She has an MA (2008) degree in European Studies from Boğaziçi University and a BS (1993) degree in Software Engineering from University of Texas at Dallas. After completing her undergraduate degree, she worked in Belbim A.Ş and at the Project Department of Istanbul Ulaşım Company and lectured at Hasan Kalyoncu University. She was a member of advisory board of Center for Postcolonial Studies. Kan was elected as a Member of Parliament of Istanbul from AK Party for the 25th legislative term of Grand National Assembly of Turkey. She was re-elected for the 26th term on 1 November 2015 and the 27th term on 24 June 2018, respectively. She served as the Vice-Chair of AK Party in charge of Human Rights and was a member of the Central Decision and Executive Board of AK Party for three terms between 2015 and 2018.

She was the Head of Turkey-China Inter-Parliamentary Friendship Group and President of the Round Table for Parliamentarians of United Nations Convention to Combat Desertification. She served as a member of the Committee on Foreign Relations and the Committee on EU Harmonization in the Grand National Assembly of Turkey.
