= Muhammet Emin Akbaşoğlu =

Turkish politician (born 1968)

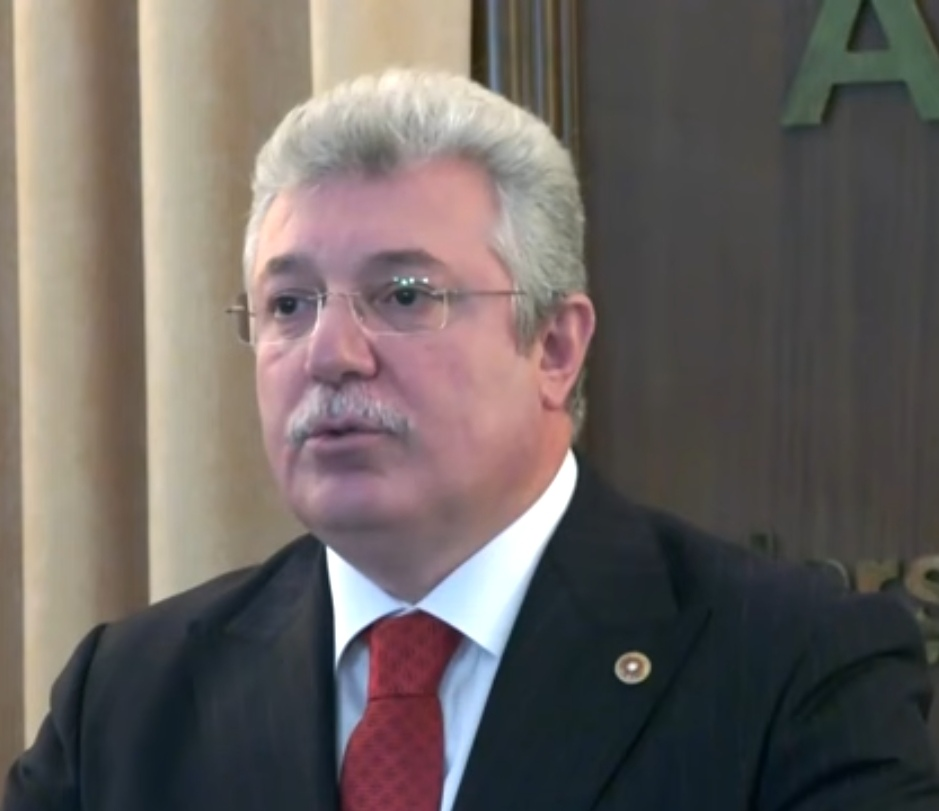
- Muhammed Emin Akbaşoğlu in 2023

Personal details
- Born: 6 October 1968 (age 56); Gaziosmanpaşa, Istanbul, Turkey
- Political party: Justice and Development Party
- Education: Imam Hatip High School; Istanbul University

Muhammet Emin Akbaşoğlu (born 6 October 1968, in Istanbul, Turkey) is a Turkish politician, lawyer and member of Turkish Parliament from Cankiri, and a member of Justice and Development Party in Turkey Parliamentary Group Deputy chairman He was first elected in the general election in June 2015.

== Biography ==
Akbaşoğlu was born in 1968 in Gaziosmanpaşa, Istanbul. He studied at Imam Hatip High School and graduated from Istanbul University's Faculty of Law.

Akbaşoğlu, who speaks Arabic and English, is married with two children.
