= İbrahim Aydemir =

Turkish footballer (born 1983)

Personal information
- Full name: İbrahim Aydemir
- Date of birth: 19 May 1983 (age 43)
- Place of birth: Augsburg, West Germany
- Height: 1.78 m (5 ft 10 in)
- Position: Striker

Team information
- Current team: SV Heimstetten

Youth career
- –1992: TSV Gersthofen
- 1992–2002: FC Bayern Munich

Senior career*
Years	Team	Apps	(Gls)
2002–2005	SpVgg Unterhaching II	82	(24)
2003–2005	SpVgg Unterhaching	3	(0)
2005–2006	Sivasspor	22	(0)
2006–2007	Samsunspor	5	(0)
2007	Etimesgut Şekerspor	5	(0)
2007–2008	SpVgg Unterhaching II	20	(10)
2008	SpVgg Unterhaching	2	(1)
2008	VfB Stuttgart II		
2008–2009	FC Ismaning		
2009–2010	SV Pullach		
2010–2012	SV Heimstetten		
2012–2015	SV Heimstetten II		
2015–2016	FC Erding		
2016	ATA Spor München		
2016–	SV Heimstetten		

International career
1998–1999	Turkey U15	12	(1)
2006	Turkey A2	1	(0)

Managerial career
- 2015–2016: FC Erding (playing assistant)
- * Club domestic league appearances and goals as of 2 August 2015

İbrahim Aydemir (born 19 May 1983 in Augsburg, West Germany) is a Turkish footballer. He plays as a striker for SV Heimstetten.

== Club career ==
Aydemir previously played for Sivasspor in the Süper Lig during the 2005–06 season, and had stints with Samsunspor in the TFF First League and Etimesgut Şekerspor in the TFF Second League. He also had a brief spell with Unterhaching in the 2. Bundesliga.
