= 27th Parliament of Turkey =

Legislature of Turkey (2018–2023)

- 7 July 2018 – 7 April 2023
- Speaker(s): Mustafa Şentop (AKP) since 24 February 2019
- Deputy Speakers: Süreyya Sadi Bilgiç (AKP); Haydar Akar (CHP); Nimetullah Erdoğmuş (HDP); Celal Adan (MHP) since 12 July 2018
- MPs: 600
- Election: June 2018
- Status: AKP minority (with support from MHP and BBP)
- Parties (at start) (Composition shown above): AKP (295); CHP (146); HDP (67); MHP (49); İYİ (43)
- Parties (at end): AKP (285); CHP (135); HDP (56); MHP (48); İYİ (37); TİP (4); DP (2); MP (2); DEVA (1); DBP (1); SP (1); BBP (1); YP (1); ZP (1); Independents (3) Vacant (22); Cabinet (7)
- Presidents: Recep Tayyip Erdoğan
- Government(s): 66th

The 27th Parliament of the Turkish Republic was elected in a snap general election held on 24 June 2018 to the Grand National Assembly. It succeeded the 26th Parliament of Turkey in July 2018 and was due to last until the latter half of 2022. The 600 members, elected through proportional representation from 87 electoral districts of Turkey, are shown in the table below.

== Current structure ==
Some deputies entered the election from the list of other parties with which their party formed electoral alliances. Democratic Party president Gültekin Uysal was in the list of İyi Parti for Afyonkarahisar, Great Unity Party president Mustafa Destici in Justice and Development Party's for Ankara (I), Nazır Cihangir İslam and Abdulkadir Karaduman of Felicity Party for Republican People's Party in İstanbul (III) and Konya respectively. Following the election, these deputies rejoined their original parties.

Mevlüt Çavuşoğlu, Süleyman Soylu, Abdülhamit Gül and Berat Albayrak were appointed as ministers, and consequently resigned to take these positions as the current Turkish constitution does not allow MPs to also be ministers.

In June 2020, with Leyla Güven and Musa Farisoğulları from the Peoples' Democratic Party (HDP) and Enis Berberoğlu from the Republican People's Party (CHP) three Parliamentarians were dismissed from office and arrested. Berberoğlu was later readmitted to parliament in February 2021. On the 17 March 2021 Ömer Faruk Gergerioğlu of the HDP was also stripped of his parliamentary immunity and dismissed from office. Yakup Taş of AKP was killed on 6 February 2023, during the 2023 Turkey–Syria earthquakes.

Party	Elected	Current	Change	Current structure
Justice and Development Party	295	285	▼10	
Republican People's Party	146	135	▼11	
Peoples' Democratic Party	67	56	▼11	
Nationalist Movement Party	49	48	▼1	
İyi Party	43	37	▼6	
Workers' Party of Turkey	0	4	▲4	
Democratic Party	0	2	▲2	
Homeland Party	0	2	▲2	
Democracy and Progress Party	0	1	▲1	
Democratic Regions Party	0	1	▲1	
Felicity Party	0	1	▲1	
Great Unity Party	0	1	▲1	
Innovation Party	0	1	▲1	
Victory Party	0	1	▲1	
Independents	0	3	▲3	
Total	600	578	▼22	

== Members ==
Electoral district	MP	Party
Adana	Jülide Sarıeroğlu	Justice and Development Party
Adana	Tamer Dağlı	Justice and Development Party
Adana	Mehmet Şükrü Erdinç	Justice and Development Party
Adana	Ahmet Zenbilci	Justice and Development Party
Adana	Abdullah Doğru	Justice and Development Party
Adana	Ayhan Barut	Republican People's Party
Adana	Orhan Sümer	Republican People's Party
Adana	Müzeyyen Şevkin	Republican People's Party
Adana	Burhanettin Bulut	Republican People's Party
Adana	Tulay Hatımoğulları Oruç	Peoples' Democratic Party
Adana	Kemal Peköz	Peoples' Democratic Party
Adana	İsmail Koncuk	İyi Party
Adana	Mehmet Metanet Çulhaoğlu	İyi Party
Adana	Muharrem Varlı	Nationalist Movement Party
Adana	Ayşe Sibel Ersoy	Nationalist Movement Party
Adıyaman	Ahmet Aydın	Justice and Development Party
Adıyaman	İbrahim Halil Fırat	Justice and Development Party
Adıyaman	Muhammed Fatih Toprak	Justice and Development Party
Adıyaman	Yakup Taş (died)	Justice and Development Party
Adıyaman	Abdurrahman Tutdere	Republican People's Party
Afyonkarahisar	Veysel Eroğlu	Justice and Development Party
Afyonkarahisar	Ali Özkaya	Justice and Development Party
Afyonkarahisar	İbrahim Yurdunuseven	Justice and Development Party
Afyonkarahisar	Burcu Köksal	Republican People's Party
Afyonkarahisar	Mehmet Taytak	Nationalist Movement Party
Afyonkarahisar	Gültekin Uysal	Democratic Party
Ağrı	Berdan Öztürk	Peoples' Democratic Party
Ağrı	Dirayet Taşdemir	Peoples' Democratic Party
Ağrı	Abdullah Koç	Peoples' Democratic Party
Ağrı	Ekrem Çelebi	Justice and Development Party
Aksaray	İlknur İnceöz	Justice and Development Party
Aksaray	Cengiz Aydoğdu	Justice and Development Party
Aksaray	Ramazan Kaşlı	Nationalist Movement Party
Aksaray	Ayhan Erel	İyi Party
Amasya	Mustafa Levent Karahocagil	Justice and Development Party
Amasya	Hasan Çilez	Justice and Development Party
Amasya	Mustafa Tuncer	Republican People's Party
Ankara (I)	Tekin Bingöl	Republican People's Party
Ankara (I)	Levent Gök	Republican People's Party
Ankara (I)	Ali Haydar Hakverdi	Republican People's Party
Ankara (I)	Bülent Kuşoğlu	Republican People's Party
Ankara (I)	Gamze Taşcıer	Republican People's Party
Ankara (I)	Yıldırım Tuğrul Türkeş	Justice and Development Party
Ankara (I)	Fatih Şahin	Justice and Development Party
Ankara (I)	Yalçın Akdoğan	Justice and Development Party
Ankara (I)	Ali İhsan Arslan	Justice and Development Party
Ankara (I)	Koray Aydın	İyi Party
Ankara (I)	İbrahim Halil Oral	İyi Party
Ankara (I)	Mevlüt Karakaya	Nationalist Movement Party
Ankara (I)	Filiz Kerestecioğlu Demir	Peoples' Democratic Party
Ankara (II)	Lütfiye Selva Çam	Justice and Development Party
Ankara (II)	Emrullah İşler	Justice and Development Party
Ankara (II)	Orhan Yegin	Justice and Development Party
Ankara (II)	Arife Polat Düzgün	Justice and Development Party
Ankara (II)	Zeynep Yıldız	Justice and Development Party
Ankara (II)	Murat Emir	Republican People's Party
Ankara (II)	Yıldırım Kaya	Republican People's Party
Ankara (II)	Sadir Durmaz	Nationalist Movement Party
Ankara (II)	Nevin Taşlıçay	Nationalist Movement Party
Ankara (II)	Şenol Bal	İyi Party
Ankara (II)	Mustafa Destici	Great Unity Party
Ankara (III)	Mehmet Naci Bostancı	Justice and Development Party
Ankara (III)	Asuman Erdoğan	Justice and Development Party
Ankara (III)	Nevzat Ceylan	Justice and Development Party
Ankara (III)	Barış Aydın	Justice and Development Party
Ankara (III)	Hacı Turan	Justice and Development Party
Ankara (III)	Ahmet Haluk Koç	Republican People's Party
Ankara (III)	Nihat Yeşil	Republican People's Party
Ankara (III)	Servet Ünsal	Republican People's Party
Ankara (III)	Yaşar Yıldırım	Nationalist Movement Party
Ankara (III)	Erkan Haberal	Nationalist Movement Party
Ankara (III)	Durmuş Yılmaz	İyi Party
Ankara (III)	Ayhan Altıntaş	İyi Party
Antalya	Mevlüt Çavuşoğlu	Justice and Development Party
Antalya	Mustafa Köse	Justice and Development Party
Antalya	Sena Nur Çelik	Justice and Development Party
Antalya	İbrahim Aydın	Justice and Development Party
Antalya	Atay Uslu	Justice and Development Party
Antalya	Kemal Çelik	Justice and Development Party
Antalya	Deniz Baykal	Republican People's Party
Antalya	Çetin Osman Budak	Republican People's Party
Antalya	Rafet Zeybek	Republican People's Party
Antalya	Aydın Özer	Republican People's Party
Antalya	Cavit Arı	Republican People's Party
Antalya	Feridun Bahşi	İyi Party
Antalya	Hasan Subaşı	İyi Party
Antalya	Tuba Vural Çokal	İyi Party
Antalya	Abdurrahman Başkan	Nationalist Movement Party
Antalya	Kemal Bülbül	Peoples' Democratic Party
Ardahan	Orhan Atalay	Justice and Development Party
Ardahan	Öztürk Yılmaz	Republican People's Party
Artvin	Ertunç Erkan Balta	Justice and Development Party
Artvin	Uğur Bayraktutan	Republican People's Party
Aydın	Mustafa Savaş	Justice and Development Party
Aydın	Bekir Kuvvet Erim	Justice and Development Party
Aydın	Metin Yavuz	Justice and Development Party
Aydın	Rıza Posacı	Justice and Development Party
Aydın	Bülent Tezcan	Republican People's Party
Aydın	Hüseyin Yıldız	Republican People's Party
Aydın	Süleyman Bülbül	Republican People's Party
Aydın	Aydın Adnan Sezgin	İyi Party
Balıkesir	Adil Çelik	Justice and Development Party
Balıkesir	Belgin Uygur	Justice and Development Party
Balıkesir	Yavuz Subaşı	Justice and Development Party
Balıkesir	Mustafa Canbey	Justice and Development Party
Balıkesir	Pakize Mutlu Aydemir	Justice and Development Party
Balıkesir	Ahmet Akın	Republican People's Party
Balıkesir	Fikret Şahin	Republican People's Party
Balıkesir	Ensar Aytekin	Republican People's Party
Balıkesir	İsmail Ok	İyi Party
Bartın	Yılmaz Tunç	Justice and Development Party
Bartın	Aysu Bankoğlu	Republican People's Party
Batman	Feleknas Uca	Peoples' Democratic Party
Batman	Necdet İpekyüz	Peoples' Democratic Party
Batman	Ayşe Acar Başaran	Peoples' Democratic Party
Batman	Mehmet Rüştü Tiryaki	Peoples' Democratic Party
Batman	Ziver Özdemir	Justice and Development Party
Bayburt	Fetani Battal	Justice and Development Party
Bilecik	Selim Yağcı	Justice and Development Party
Bilecik	Yaşar Tüzün	Republican People's Party
Bingöl	Cevdet Yılmaz	Justice and Development Party
Bingöl	Feyzi Berdibek	Justice and Development Party
Bingöl	Erdal Aydemir	Peoples' Democratic Party
Bitlis	Cemal Taşar	Justice and Development Party
Bitlis	Vahit Kiler	Justice and Development Party
Bitlis	Mahmut Celadet Gaydalı	Peoples' Democratic Party
Bolu	Arzu Aydın	Justice and Development Party
Bolu	Fehmi Küpçü	Justice and Development Party
Bolu	Tanju Özcan	Republican People's Party
Burdur	Bayram Özçelik	Justice and Development Party
Burdur	Yasin Uğur	Justice and Development Party
Burdur	Mehmet Göker	Republican People's Party
Bursa (I)	Hakan Çavuşoğlu	Justice and Development Party
Bursa (I)	Mustafa Esgin	Justice and Development Party
Bursa (I)	Refik Özen	Justice and Development Party
Bursa (I)	Emine Yavuz Gözgeç	Justice and Development Party
Bursa (I)	Ahmet Kılıç	Justice and Development Party
Bursa (I)	Lale Karabıyık	Republican People's Party
Bursa (I)	Erkan Aydın	Republican People's Party
Bursa (I)	Nurhayat Altaca Kayışoğlu	Republican People's Party
Bursa (I)	İsmail Tatlıoğlu	İyi Party
Bursa (I)	İsmet Büyükataman	Nationalist Movement Party
Bursa (II)	Efkan Ala	Justice and Development Party
Bursa (II)	Osman Mesten	Justice and Development Party
Bursa (II)	Vildan Yılmaz Gürel	Justice and Development Party
Bursa (II)	Zafer Işık	Justice and Development Party
Bursa (II)	Muhammet Müfit Aydın	Justice and Development Party
Bursa (II)	Atilla Ödünç	Justice and Development Party
Bursa (II)	Orhan Sarıbal	Republican People's Party
Bursa (II)	Yüksel Özkan	Republican People's Party
Bursa (II)	Mustafa Hidayet Vahapoğlu	Nationalist Movement Party
Bursa (II)	Ahmet Kamil Erozan	İyi Party
Çanakkale	Bülent Turan	Justice and Development Party
Çanakkale	Jülide İskenderoğlu	Justice and Development Party
Çanakkale	Muharrem Erkek	Republican People's Party
Çanakkale	Özgür Ceylan	Republican People's Party
Çankırı	Muhammet Emin Akbaşoğlu	Justice and Development Party
Çankırı	Salim Çivitcioğlu	Justice and Development Party
Çorum	Ahmet Sami Ceylan	Justice and Development Party
Çorum	Oğuzhan Kaya	Justice and Development Party
Çorum	Erol Kavuncu	Justice and Development Party
Çorum	Tufan Köse	Republican People's Party
Denizli	Cahit Özkan	Justice and Development Party
Denizli	Şahin Tin	Justice and Development Party
Denizli	Ahmet Yıldız	Justice and Development Party
Denizli	Nilgün Ök	Justice and Development Party
Denizli	Gülizar Biçer Karaca	Republican People's Party
Denizli	Kazım Arslan	Republican People's Party
Denizli	Haşim Teoman Sancar	Republican People's Party
Denizli	Yasin Öztürk	İyi Party
Diyarbakır	Adnan Selçuk Mızraklı (resigned to become Mayor of Diyarbakır)	Peoples' Democratic Party
Diyarbakır	Saliha Aydeniz	Peoples' Democratic Party
Diyarbakır	İmam Taşçıer	Peoples' Democratic Party
Diyarbakır	Remziye Tosun	Peoples' Democratic Party
Diyarbakır	Hişyar Özsoy	Peoples' Democratic Party
Diyarbakır	Semra Güzel	Peoples' Democratic Party
Diyarbakır	Garo Paylan	Peoples' Democratic Party
Diyarbakır	Dersim Dağ	Peoples' Democratic Party
Diyarbakır	Musa Farisoğulları (dismissed)	Peoples' Democratic Party
Diyarbakır	Mehmet Mehdi Eker	Justice and Development Party
Diyarbakır	Ebubekir Bal	Justice and Development Party
Diyarbakır	Oya Eronat	Justice and Development Party
Düzce	Fahri Çakır	Justice and Development Party
Düzce	Ayşe Keşir	Justice and Development Party
Düzce	Ümit Yılmaz	Nationalist Movement Party
Edirne	Okan Gaytancıoğlu	Republican People's Party
Edirne	Erdin Bircan	Republican People's Party
Edirne	Fatma Aksal	Justice and Development Party
Edirne	Orhan Çakırlar	İyi Party
Elazığ	Metin Bulut	Justice and Development Party
Elazığ	Sermin Balık	Justice and Development Party
Elazığ	Zülfü Tolga Ağar	Justice and Development Party
Elazığ	Zülfü Demirbağ	Justice and Development Party
Elazığ	Gürsel Erol	Republican People's Party
Erzincan	Süleyman Karaman	Justice and Development Party
Erzincan	Burhan Çakır	Justice and Development Party
Erzurum	Recep Akdağ	Justice and Development Party
Erzurum	Zehra Taşkesenlioğlu	Justice and Development Party
Erzurum	Selami Altınok	Justice and Development Party
Erzurum	İbrahim Aydemir	Justice and Development Party
Erzurum	Kamil Aydın	Nationalist Movement Party
Erzurum	Muhammet Naci Cinisli	İyi Party
Eskişehir	Nabi Avcı	Justice and Development Party
Eskişehir	Harun Karacan	Justice and Development Party
Eskişehir	Emine Nur Günay	Justice and Development Party
Eskişehir	Utku Çakırözer	Republican People's Party
Eskişehir	Jale Nur Süllü	Republican People's Party
Eskişehir	Arslan Kabukcuoğlu	İyi Party
Eskişehir	Metin Nurullah Sazak	Nationalist Movement Party
Gaziantep	Abdulhamit Gül	Justice and Development Party
Gaziantep	Ahmet Uzer	Justice and Development Party
Gaziantep	Mehmet Erdoğan	Justice and Development Party
Gaziantep	Abdullah Nejat Koçer	Justice and Development Party
Gaziantep	Derya Bakbak	Justice and Development Party
Gaziantep	Ali Şahin	Justice and Development Party
Gaziantep	Müslüm Yüksel	Justice and Development Party
Gaziantep	Mehmet Sait Kirazoğlu	Justice and Development Party
Gaziantep	Bayram Yılmazkaya	Republican People's Party
Gaziantep	İrfan Kaplan	Republican People's Party
Gaziantep	Ali Muhittin Taşdoğan	Nationalist Movement Party
Gaziantep	Sermet Atay	Nationalist Movement Party
Gaziantep	Mahmut Toğrul	Peoples' Democratic Party
Gaziantep	İmam Hüseyin Filiz	İyi Party
Giresun	Cemal Öztürk	Justice and Development Party
Giresun	Kadir Aydın	Justice and Development Party
Giresun	Sabri Öztürk	Justice and Development Party
Giresun	Necati Tığlı	Republican People's Party
Gümüşhane	Hacı Osman Akgül	Justice and Development Party
Gümüşhane	Cihan Pektaş	Justice and Development Party
Hakkâri	Leyla Güven (dismissed)	Peoples' Democratic Party
Hakkâri	Sait Dede	Peoples' Democratic Party
Hakkâri	Husret Dinç	Justice and Development Party
Hatay	Hacı Bayram Türkoğlu	Justice and Development Party
Hatay	Hüseyin Yayman	Justice and Development Party
Hatay	Abdulkadir Özel	Justice and Development Party
Hatay	Hüseyin Şanverdi	Justice and Development Party
Hatay	Sabahat Özgürsoy Çelik	Justice and Development Party
Hatay	Mehmet Güzelmansur	Republican People's Party
Hatay	Suzan Şahin	Republican People's Party
Hatay	Serkan Topal	Republican People's Party
Hatay	İsmet Tokdemir	Republican People's Party
Hatay	Lütfi Kaşıkçı	Nationalist Movement Party
Hatay	Barış Atay Mengüllüoğlu (moved to TiP)	Peoples' Democratic Party
Iğdır	Habip Eksik	Peoples' Democratic Party
Iğdır	Yaşar Karadağ	Nationalist Movement Party
Isparta	Süreyya Sadi Bilgiç	Justice and Development Party
Isparta	Recep Özel	Justice and Development Party
Isparta	Mehmet Uğur Gökgöz	Justice and Development Party
Isparta	Aylin Cesur	İyi Party
İstanbul (I)	Berat Albayrak	Justice and Development Party
İstanbul (I)	Nurettin Canikli	Justice and Development Party
İstanbul (I)	Mustafa Ataş	Justice and Development Party
İstanbul (I)	Erol Kaya	Justice and Development Party
İstanbul (I)	Vedat Demiröz	Justice and Development Party
İstanbul (I)	Ravza Kavakcı Kan	Justice and Development Party
İstanbul (I)	Osman Boyraz	Justice and Development Party
İstanbul (I)	İsmet Uçma	Justice and Development Party
İstanbul (I)	Mihrimah Belma Satır	Justice and Development Party
İstanbul (I)	Ahmet Berat Çonkar	Justice and Development Party
İstanbul (I)	Hulusi Şentürk	Justice and Development Party
İstanbul (I)	Müşerref Pervin Tuba Durgut	Justice and Development Party
İstanbul (I)	Eyüp Özsoy	Justice and Development Party
İstanbul (I)	Serkan Bayram	Justice and Development Party
İstanbul (I)	Fatih Süleyman Denizolgun	Justice and Development Party
İstanbul (I)	İbrahim Özden Kaboğlu	Republican People's Party
İstanbul (I)	Mehmet Akif Hamzaçebi	Republican People's Party
İstanbul (I)	Gamze Akkuş İlgezdi	Republican People's Party
İstanbul (I)	Onursal Adıgüzel	Republican People's Party
İstanbul (I)	Fethi Açıkel	Republican People's Party
İstanbul (I)	Gürsel Tekin	Republican People's Party
İstanbul (I)	İlhan Kesici	Republican People's Party
İstanbul (I)	Oğuz Kaan Salıcı	Republican People's Party
İstanbul (I)	Mahmut Tanal	Republican People's Party
İstanbul (I)	Saliha Sera Kadıgil Sütlü	Republican People's Party
İstanbul (I)	Hüseyin Emre Bağce	Republican People's Party
İstanbul (I)	Pervin Buldan	Peoples' Democratic Party
İstanbul (I)	Musa Piroğlu	Peoples' Democratic Party
İstanbul (I)	Erkan Baş	Peoples' Democratic Party
İstanbul (I)	Erol Katırcıoğlu	Peoples' Democratic Party
İstanbul (I)	Hayrettin Nuhoğlu	İyi Party
İstanbul (I)	Ahmet Çelik	İyi Party
İstanbul (I)	Yavuz Ağıralioğlu	İyi Party
İstanbul (I)	Edip Semih Yalçın	Nationalist Movement Party
İstanbul (I)	İzzet Ulvi Yönter	Nationalist Movement Party
İstanbul (II)	Süleyman Soylu	Justice and Development Party
İstanbul (II)	Fatma Betül Sayan Kaya	Justice and Development Party
İstanbul (II)	Volkan Bozkır	Justice and Development Party
İstanbul (II)	Abdullah Güler	Justice and Development Party
İstanbul (II)	Hasan Turan	Justice and Development Party
İstanbul (II)	Serap Yaşar	Justice and Development Party
İstanbul (II)	Aziz Babuşcu	Justice and Development Party
İstanbul (II)	Şirin Ünal	Justice and Development Party
İstanbul (II)	Canan Kalsın	Justice and Development Party
İstanbul (II)	Ahmet Hamdi Çamlı	Justice and Development Party
İstanbul (II)	Markar Eseyan	Justice and Development Party
İstanbul (II)	Mustafa Demir	Justice and Development Party
İstanbul (II)	İffet Polat	Justice and Development Party
İstanbul (II)	Kadri Enis Berberoğlu	Republican People's Party
İstanbul (II)	Aykut Erdoğdu	Republican People's Party
İstanbul (II)	Ahmet Ünal Çeviköz	Republican People's Party
İstanbul (II)	Mustafa Sezgin Tanrıkulu	Republican People's Party
İstanbul (II)	Yüksel Mansur Kılınç	Republican People's Party
İstanbul (II)	Yunus Emre	Republican People's Party
İstanbul (II)	Gökan Zeybek	Republican People's Party
İstanbul (II)	Ali Şeker	Republican People's Party
İstanbul (II)	Ahmet Şık (moved to TiP)	Peoples' Democratic Party
İstanbul (II)	Oya Ersoy	Peoples' Democratic Party
İstanbul (II)	Hüda Kaya	Peoples' Democratic Party
İstanbul (II)	Celal Adan	Nationalist Movement Party
İstanbul (II)	Cemal Çetin	Nationalist Movement Party
İstanbul (II)	Ümit Özdağ	İyi Party
İstanbul (II)	Fatih Mehmet Şeker	İyi Party
İstanbul (III)	Numan Kurtulmuş	Justice and Development Party
İstanbul (III)	Mehmet Muş	Justice and Development Party
İstanbul (III)	Akif Çağatay Kılıç	Justice and Development Party
İstanbul (III)	Mehmet Doğan Kubat	Justice and Development Party
İstanbul (III)	Tülay Kaynarca	Justice and Development Party
İstanbul (III)	Halis Dalkılıç	Justice and Development Party
İstanbul (III)	Emine Sare Aydın Yılmaz	Justice and Development Party
İstanbul (III)	Nevzat Şatıroğlu	Justice and Development Party
İstanbul (III)	Zafer Sırakaya	Justice and Development Party
İstanbul (III)	Rümeysa Kadak	Justice and Development Party
İstanbul (III)	Ahmet Mücahit Arınç	Justice and Development Party
İstanbul (III)	Mustafa Yeneroğlu	Justice and Development Party
İstanbul (III)	Erkan Kandemir	Justice and Development Party
İstanbul (III)	Şamil Ayrım	Justice and Development Party
İstanbul (III)	Alev Dedegil	Justice and Development Party
İstanbul (III)	Engin Altay	Republican People's Party
İstanbul (III)	Erdoğan Toprak	Republican People's Party
İstanbul (III)	Mehmet Bekaroğlu	Republican People's Party
İstanbul (III)	Zeynel Emre	Republican People's Party
İstanbul (III)	Sibel Özdemir	Republican People's Party
İstanbul (III)	Özgür Karabat	Republican People's Party
İstanbul (III)	Turan Aydoğan	Republican People's Party
İstanbul (III)	Emine Gülizar Emecan	Republican People's Party
İstanbul (III)	Nazır Cihangir İslam	Felicity Party
İstanbul (III)	Zeynel Özen	Peoples' Democratic Party
İstanbul (III)	Dilşat Canbaz Kaya	Peoples' Democratic Party
İstanbul (III)	Saruhan Oluç	Peoples' Democratic Party
İstanbul (III)	Ali Kenanoğlu	Peoples' Democratic Party
İstanbul (III)	Züleyha Gülüm	Peoples' Democratic Party
İstanbul (III)	Feti Yıldız	Nationalist Movement Party
İstanbul (III)	İsmail Faruk Aksu	Nationalist Movement Party
İstanbul (III)	Arzu Erdem	Nationalist Movement Party
İstanbul (III)	Abdul Ahat Andican	İyi Party
İstanbul (III)	Ümit Beyaz	İyi Party
İstanbul (III)	Hayati Arkaz	İyi Party
İzmir (I)	Ahmet Tuncay Özkan	Republican People's Party
İzmir (I)	Murat Bakan	Republican People's Party
İzmir (I)	Özcan Purçu	Republican People's Party
İzmir (I)	Kani Beko	Republican People's Party
İzmir (I)	Mehmet Ali Çelebi	Republican People's Party
İzmir (I)	Tacettin Bayır	Republican People's Party
İzmir (I)	Ednan Arslan	Republican People's Party
İzmir (I)	Binali Yıldırım	Justice and Development Party
İzmir (I)	Mahmut Atilla Kaya	Justice and Development Party
İzmir (I)	Ceyda Bölünmez Çankırı	Justice and Development Party
İzmir (I)	Cemal Bekle	Justice and Development Party
İzmir (I)	Serpil Kemalbay Pekgözegü	Peoples' Democratic Party
İzmir (I)	Dursun Müsavat Dervişoğlu	İyi Party
İzmir (I)	Hasan Kalyoncu	Nationalist Movement Party
İzmir (II)	Kemal Kılıçdaroğlu	Republican People's Party
İzmir (II)	Selin Sayek Böke	Republican People's Party
İzmir (II)	Kamil Okyay Sındır	Republican People's Party
İzmir (II)	Atila Sertel	Republican People's Party
İzmir (II)	Sevda Erdan Kılıç	Republican People's Party
İzmir (II)	Mahir Polat	Republican People's Party
İzmir (II)	Bedri Serter	Republican People's Party
İzmir (II)	Hamza Dağ	Justice and Development Party
İzmir (II)	Fehmi Alpay Özalan	Justice and Development Party
İzmir (II)	Necip Nasır	Justice and Development Party
İzmir (II)	Yaşar Kırkpınar	Justice and Development Party
İzmir (II)	Aytun Çıray	İyi Party
İzmir (II)	Murat Çepni	Peoples' Democratic Party
İzmir (II)	Tamer Osmanağaoğlu	Nationalist Movement Party
Kahramanmaraş	Mahir Ünal	Justice and Development Party
Kahramanmaraş	Ahmet Özdemir	Justice and Development Party
Kahramanmaraş	Celalettin Güvenç	Justice and Development Party
Kahramanmaraş	İmran Kılıç	Justice and Development Party
Kahramanmaraş	Mehmet Cihat Sezal	Justice and Development Party
Kahramanmaraş	Habibe Öçal	Justice and Development Party
Kahramanmaraş	Sefer Aycan	Nationalist Movement Party
Kahramanmaraş	Ali Öztunç	Republican People's Party
Karabük	Cumhur Ünal	Justice and Development Party
Karabük	Niyazi Güneş	Justice and Development Party
Karabük	Hüseyin Avni Aksoy	Republican People's Party
Karaman	Recep Şeker	Justice and Development Party
Karaman	Selman Oğuzhan Eser	Justice and Development Party
Karaman	İsmail Atakan Ünver	Republican People's Party
Kars	Ahmet Arslan	Justice and Development Party
Kars	Yunus Kılıç	Justice and Development Party
Kars	Ayhan Bilgen (resigned to become Mayor)	Peoples' Democratic Party
Kastamonu	Hakkı Köylü	Justice and Development Party
Kastamonu	Metin Çelik	Justice and Development Party
Kastamonu	Hasan Baltacı	Republican People's Party
Kayseri	Mehmet Özhaseki	Justice and Development Party
Kayseri	Mustafa Elitaş	Justice and Development Party
Kayseri	Taner Yıldız	Justice and Development Party
Kayseri	İsmail Emrah Karayel	Justice and Development Party
Kayseri	İsmail Tamer	Justice and Development Party
Kayseri	Hülya Nergis	Justice and Development Party
Kayseri	İsmail Özdemir	Nationalist Movement Party
Kayseri	Mustafa Baki Ersoy	Nationalist Movement Party
Kayseri	Çetin Arık	Republican People's Party
Kayseri	Dursun Ataş	İyi Party
Kırıkkale	Ramazan Can	Justice and Development Party
Kırıkkale	Halil Öztürk	Nationalist Movement Party
Kırıkkale	Ahmet Önal	Republican People's Party
Kırklareli	Türabi Kayan	Republican People's Party
Kırklareli	Vecdi Gündoğdu	Republican People's Party
Kırklareli	Selahattin Minsolmaz	Justice and Development Party
Kırşehir	Mustafa Kendirli	Justice and Development Party
Kırşehir	Metin İlhan	Republican People's Party
Kilis	Mustafa Hilmi Dülger	Justice and Development Party
Kilis	Ahmet Salih Dal	Justice and Development Party
Kocaeli	Fikri Işık	Justice and Development Party
Kocaeli	İlyas Şeker	Justice and Development Party
Kocaeli	Radiye Sezer Katırcıoğlu	Justice and Development Party
Kocaeli	Mehmet Akif Yılmaz	Justice and Development Party
Kocaeli	Sami Çakır	Justice and Development Party
Kocaeli	Cemil Yaman	Justice and Development Party
Kocaeli	Emine Zeybek	Justice and Development Party
Kocaeli	Fatma Kaplan Hürriyet	Republican People's Party
Kocaeli	Haydar Akar	Republican People's Party
Kocaeli	Tahsin Tarhan	Republican People's Party
Kocaeli	Saffet Sancaklı	Nationalist Movement Party
Kocaeli	Lütfü Türkkan	İyi Party
Kocaeli	Ömer Faruk Gergerlioğlu	Peoples' Democratic Party
Konya	Ahmet Sorgun	Justice and Development Party
Konya	Tahir Akyürek	Justice and Development Party
Konya	Orhan Erdem	Justice and Development Party
Konya	Leyla Şahin Usta	Justice and Development Party
Konya	Ziya Altunyaldız	Justice and Development Party
Konya	Hacı Ahmet Özdemir	Justice and Development Party
Konya	Gülay Samancı	Justice and Development Party
Konya	Abdullah Ağralı	Justice and Development Party
Konya	Selman Özboyacı	Justice and Development Party
Konya	Halil Etyemez	Justice and Development Party
Konya	Mustafa Kalaycı	Nationalist Movement Party
Konya	Esin Kara	Nationalist Movement Party
Konya	Abdullatif Şener	Republican People's Party
Konya	Abdulkadir Karaduman	Felicity Party
Konya	Fahrettin Yokuş	İyi Party
Kütahya	Ahmet Tan	Justice and Development Party
Kütahya	İshak Gazel	Justice and Development Party
Kütahya	Ceyda Çetin Erenler	Justice and Development Party
Kütahya	Ahmet Erbaş	Nationalist Movement Party
Kütahya	Ali Fazıl Kasap	Republican People's Party
Malatya	Bülent Tüfenkci	Justice and Development Party
Malatya	Öznur Çalık	Justice and Development Party
Malatya	Ahmet Çakır	Justice and Development Party
Malatya	Hakan Kahtalı	Justice and Development Party
Malatya	Veli Ağbaba	Republican People's Party
Malatya	Mehmet Celal Fendoğlu	Nationalist Movement Party
Manisa	Murat Baybatur	Justice and Development Party
Manisa	Uğur Aydemir	Justice and Development Party
Manisa	İsmail Bilen	Justice and Development Party
Manisa	Semra Kaplan Kıvırcık	Justice and Development Party
Manisa	Mehmet Ali Özkan	Justice and Development Party
Manisa	Özgür Özel	Republican People's Party
Manisa	Ahmet Vehbi Bakırlıoğlu	Republican People's Party
Manisa	Bekir Başevirgen	Republican People's Party
Manisa	Tamer Akkal	İyi Party
Manisa	Erkan Akçay	Nationalist Movement Party
Mardin	Mithat Sancar	Peoples' Democratic Party
Mardin	Pero Dundar	Peoples' Democratic Party
Mardin	Tuma Çelik	Peoples' Democratic Party
Mardin	Ebru Günay	Peoples' Democratic Party
Mardin	Şeyhmus Dinçel	Justice and Development Party
Mardin	Cengiz Demirkaya	Justice and Development Party
Mersin	Lütfi Elvan	Justice and Development Party
Mersin	Ali Cumhur Taşkın	Justice and Development Party
Mersin	Zeynep Gül Yılmaz	Justice and Development Party
Mersin	Hacı Özkan	Justice and Development Party
Mersin	Cengiz Gökçel	Republican People's Party
Mersin	Alpay Antmen	Republican People's Party
Mersin	Ali Mahir Başarır	Republican People's Party
Mersin	Fatma Kurtulan	Peoples' Democratic Party
Mersin	Rıdvan Turan	Peoples' Democratic Party
Mersin	Behiç Çelik	İyi Party
Mersin	Zeki Hakan Sıdalı	İyi Party
Mersin	Olcay Kılavuz	Nationalist Movement Party
Mersin	Baki Şimşek	Nationalist Movement Party
Muğla	Mürsel Alban	Republican People's Party
Muğla	Suat Özcan	Republican People's Party
Muğla	Burak Erbay	Republican People's Party
Muğla	Süleyman Girgin	Republican People's Party
Muğla	Mehmet Yavuz Demir	Justice and Development Party
Muğla	Yelda Erol Gökcan	Justice and Development Party
Muğla	Metin Ergun	İyi Party
Muş	Gülüstan Kılıç Koçyiğit	Peoples' Democratic Party
Muş	Mensur Işık	Peoples' Democratic Party
Muş	Şevin Coşkun	Peoples' Democratic Party
Muş	Mehmet Emin Şimşek	Justice and Development Party
Nevşehir	Mustafa Açıkgöz	Justice and Development Party
Nevşehir	Yücel Menekşe	Justice and Development Party
Nevşehir	Faruk Sarıaslan	Republican People's Party
Niğde	Yavuz Ergun	Justice and Development Party
Niğde	Selim Gültekin	Justice and Development Party
Niğde	Ömer Fethi Gürer	Republican People's Party
Ordu	Şenel Yediyıldız	Justice and Development Party
Ordu	Ergün Taşcı	Justice and Development Party
Ordu	Metin Gündoğdu	Justice and Development Party
Ordu	Seyit Torun	Republican People's Party
Ordu	Mustafa Adıgüzel	Republican People's Party
Ordu	Cemal Enginyurt	Nationalist Movement Party
Osmaniye	Mücahit Durmuşoğlu	Justice and Development Party
Osmaniye	İsmail Kaya	Justice and Development Party
Osmaniye	Devlet Bahçeli	Nationalist Movement Party
Osmaniye	Baha Ünlü	Republican People's Party
Rize	Hayati Yazıcı	Justice and Development Party
Rize	Osman Aşkın Bak	Justice and Development Party
Rize	Muhammed Avcı	Justice and Development Party
Sakarya	Ali İhsan Yavuz	Justice and Development Party
Sakarya	Recep Uncuoğlu	Justice and Development Party
Sakarya	Kenan Sofuoğlu	Justice and Development Party
Sakarya	Çiğdem Erdoğan Atabek	Justice and Development Party
Sakarya	Engin Özkoç	Republican People's Party
Sakarya	Muhammed Levent Bülbül	Nationalist Movement Party
Sakarya	Ümit Dikbayır	İyi Party
Samsun	Ahmet Demircan	Justice and Development Party
Samsun	Yusuf Ziya Yılmaz	Justice and Development Party
Samsun	Çiğdem Karaaslan	Justice and Development Party
Samsun	Fuat Köktaş	Justice and Development Party
Samsun	Orhan Kırcalı	Justice and Development Party
Samsun	Kemal Zeybek	Republican People's Party
Samsun	Neslihan Hancıoğlu	Republican People's Party
Samsun	Erhan Usta	Nationalist Movement Party
Samsun	Bedri Yaşar	İyi Party
Siirt	Meral Danış Beştaş	Peoples' Democratic Party
Siirt	Sıdık Taş	Peoples' Democratic Party
Siirt	Osman Ören	Justice and Development Party
Sinop	Nazım Maviş	Justice and Development Party
Sinop	Barış Karadeniz	Republican People's Party
Sivas	İsmet Yılmaz	Justice and Development Party
Sivas	Mehmet Habib Soluk	Justice and Development Party
Sivas	Semiha Ekinci	Justice and Development Party
Sivas	Ahmet Özyürek	Nationalist Movement Party
Sivas	Ulaş Karasu	Republican People's Party
Şanlıurfa	Ahmet Eşref Fakıbaba	Justice and Development Party
Şanlıurfa	Mehmet Kasım Gülpınar	Justice and Development Party
Şanlıurfa	Halil Özcan	Justice and Development Party
Şanlıurfa	Zemzem Gülender Açanal	Justice and Development Party
Şanlıurfa	Mehmet Ali Cevheri	Justice and Development Party
Şanlıurfa	İbrahim Halil Yıldız	Justice and Development Party
Şanlıurfa	Halil Özşavlı	Justice and Development Party
Şanlıurfa	Ahmet Akay	Justice and Development Party
Şanlıurfa	Nimetullah Erdoğmuş	Peoples' Democratic Party
Şanlıurfa	Ayşe Sürücü	Peoples' Democratic Party
Şanlıurfa	Nusrettin Maçin	Peoples' Democratic Party
Şanlıurfa	Ömer Öcalan	Peoples' Democratic Party
Şanlıurfa	İbrahim Özyavuz	Nationalist Movement Party
Şanlıurfa	Aziz Aydınlık	Republican People's Party
Şırnak	Hasan Özgüneş	Peoples' Democratic Party
Şırnak	Nuran İmir	Peoples' Democratic Party
Şırnak	Hüseyin Kaçmaz	Peoples' Democratic Party
Şırnak	Rizgin Birlik	Justice and Development Party
Tekirdağ	Faik Öztrak	Republican People's Party
Tekirdağ	İlhami Özcan Aygun	Republican People's Party
Tekirdağ	Candan Yüceer	Republican People's Party
Tekirdağ	Mustafa Şentop	Justice and Development Party
Tekirdağ	Mustafa Yel	Justice and Development Party
Tekirdağ	Çiğdem Koncagül	Justice and Development Party
Tekirdağ	Enez Kaplan	İyi Party
Tokat	Yusuf Beyazıt	Justice and Development Party
Tokat	Mustafa Arslan	Justice and Development Party
Tokat	Özlem Zengin	Justice and Development Party
Tokat	Yücel Bulut	Nationalist Movement Party
Tokat	Kadim Durmaz	Republican People's Party
Trabzon	Muhammet Balta	Justice and Development Party
Trabzon	Adnan Günnar	Justice and Development Party
Trabzon	Bahar Ayvazoğlu	Justice and Development Party
Trabzon	Salih Cora	Justice and Development Party
Trabzon	Ahmet Kaya	Republican People's Party
Trabzon	Hüseyin Örs	İyi Party
Tunceli	Alican Önlü	Peoples' Democratic Party
Tunceli	Polat Şaroğlu	Republican People's Party
Uşak	Mehmet Altay	Justice and Development Party
Uşak	İsmail Güneş	Justice and Development Party
Uşak	Özkan Yalım	Republican People's Party
Van	Sezai Temelli	Peoples' Democratic Party
Van	Bedia Özgökçe Ertan (resigned to become Mayor of Van)	Peoples' Democratic Party
Van	Murat Sarısaç	Peoples' Democratic Party
Van	Muazzez Orhan	Peoples' Democratic Party
Van	Tayip Temel	Peoples' Democratic Party
Van	Osman Nuri Gülaçar	Justice and Development Party
Van	İrfan Kartal	Justice and Development Party
Van	Abdulahat Arvas	Justice and Development Party
Yalova	Ahmet Büyükgümüş	Justice and Development Party
Yalova	Meliha Akyol	Justice and Development Party
Yalova	Özcan Özel	Republican People's Party
Yozgat	Bekir Bozdağ	Justice and Development Party
Yozgat	Yusuf Başer	Justice and Development Party
Yozgat	İbrahim Ethem Sadef	Nationalist Movement Party
Yozgat	Ali Keven	Republican People's Party
Zonguldak	Polat Türkmen	Justice and Development Party
Zonguldak	Ahmet Çolakoğlu	Justice and Development Party
Zonguldak	Hamdi Uçar	Justice and Development Party
Zonguldak	Ünal Demirtaş	Republican People's Party
Zonguldak	Deniz Yavuzyılmaz	Republican People's Party
