= Levent Gök =

Turkish politician (born 1959)

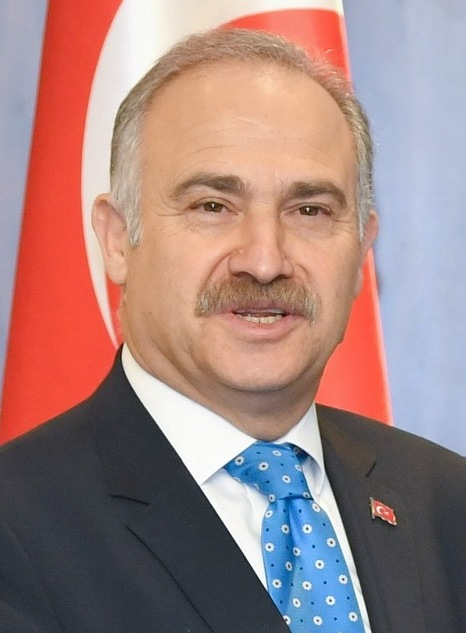
- Gök in 2019

Deputy Speaker of the Grand National Assembly
- In office 12 July 2018 – 18 June 2020
- Speaker: Binali Yıldırım
- Serving with: Mustafa Şentop; Mithat Sancar; Celal Adan
- Preceded by: Yaşar Tüzün
- Succeeded by: Haydar Akar

Deputy Parliamentary group leader of the Republican People's Party
- In office 22 August 2014 – 8 July 2018
- Leader: Kemal Kılıçdaroğlu
- Serving with: Akif Hamzaçebi (2014-15); Özgür Özel; Engin Altay
- Preceded by: Muharrem İnce
- Succeeded by: Engin Özkoç

Member of the Grand National Assembly
- In office 12 June 2011 – 3 June 2023
- Constituency: Ankara (I) (2011, June 2015, Nov 2015, 2018)

Personal details
- Born: 24 October 1959 (age 66) Balıkesir, Turkey
- Party: Republican People's Party
- Education: Law
- Alma mater: Ankara University, Law School

Levent Gök (born 24 October 1959) is a Turkish politician from the Republican People's Party (CHP) who currently serves as one of the three parliamentary group leaders for his party since 22 August 2014. He succeeded Muharrem İnce, who resigned to contest the 18th CHP Extraordinary Convention as a leadership candidate. He has been a Member of Parliament for Ankara's first electoral district since the 2011 general election.

== Early life and career ==
Levent Gök was born in Balıkesir on 24 October 1959 and graduated from Ankara University Faculty of Law. Becoming a freelance lawyer, he was an executive board member of the Human Rights Association and also served as a delegate for the Turkish Bars Association. He is married with two children and can speak English at a fluent level.

== Political career ==
=== Member of Parliament ===
Having served as the President of the Republican People's Party (CHP) Ankara Provincial Branch, Gök was elected as a CHP Member of Parliament for Ankara's first electoral district in the 2011 general election. He was re-elected in June 2015 and November 2015.

=== Party Council and group leader ===
In 2012, Gök was elected to the CHP Party Council, but resigned on 22 August 2014 after being elected as one of the party's parliamentary group leaders. He was elected after Muharrem İnce, a former group leader, resigned in order to run against Kemal Kılıçdaroğlu in the 18th CHP Extraordinary Convention. He was re-elected to the position in the 25th and 26th Parliaments in June and November 2015 respectively, serving alongside Özgür Özel and Engin Altay.

== See also ==
- Ankara (electoral districts)
