= Deputy Speaker of the Grand National Assembly =

Deputy Speaker(s) of the Parliament
- Meclis Başkanvekili
- Seal of Grand National Assembly
- Incumbent Bekir Bozdağ; Justice and Development Party Tekin Bingöl; Republican People's Party Pervin Buldan; Peoples' Equality and Democracy Party Celal Adan; Nationalist Movement Party since 7 June 2023
- Appointer: Grand National Assembly of Turkey
- Formation: 23 April 1920; 106 years ago
- Website: www.tbmm.gov.tr

The Deputy Speaker(s) of the Grand National Assembly of Turkey (Turkish: Türkiye Büyük Millet Meclisi Başkanvekilleri) serve on the Speakers Council (Turkish: Başkanlık Divanı) in the Grand National Assembly, the unicameral Parliament of the Turkish Republic. There are four Deputy Speakers, selected according to the parliamentary composition of the incumbent Parliament. Unlike the Speaker of the Grand National Assembly, the Deputy Speakers are not elected by MPs. Instead, each party who has enough representation to nominate a Deputy Speaker can do so, with their nomination automatically becoming official. However, parties can also hold elections within their parliamentary groups to determine their Deputy Speaker.

In the current 28th Parliament of Turkey, there are five parties with representation but only four obtained the right to a Deputy Speaker. The governing Justice and Development Party (AKP) nominated one deputy, namely Bekir Bozdağ. The Republican People's Party (CHP) nominated Gülizar Biçer Karaca and the Peoples' Democratic Party (HDP) nominated Sırrı Süreyya Önder. The National Movement Party (MHP) nominated Celal Adan. The Good Party (İYİ), holding 43 seats, was not eligible to select a deputy.

== Current deputy speakers ==
The current Deputy Speakers for the 28th Parliament of Turkey:

| Party | | Portrait | Deputy | Term start |
|---|---|---|---|---|
| AK Party | Justice and Development Party | | Bekir Bozdağ | 14 June 2023 |
| CHP | Republican People's Party | | Tekin Bingöl | 14 June 2025 |
| DEM | Peoples' Equality and Democracy Party | | Pervin Buldan | 14 June 2025 |
| MHP | Nationalist Movement Party | | Celal Adan | 6 June 2023 |

== List of former Deputy Speakers ==
| Parliament (start - end) | Deputy | Deputy | Deputy | Deputy |
|---|---|---|---|---|
| 27th 7 July 2018 – present | Süreyya Sadi Bilgiç 24 February 2020 – present ___ Mustafa Şentop 12 July 2018 – 24 February 2019 | Haydar Akar 16 July 2020 – present ___ Levent Gök 12 July 2018 – 18 June 2020 | Nimetullah Erdoğmuş 23 February 2020 – present ___ Mithat Sancar 20 February 2018 – 23 February 2020 | Celal Adan 12 July 2018 – present |
| 26th 17 November 2015 – 24 June 2018 | Ahmet Aydın; 17 November 2015 – 24 June 2018 | Ayşe Nur Bahçekapılı; 17 November 2015 – 24 June 2018 | Yaşar Tüzün; 26 October 2017 – 24 June 2018 | Mithat Sancar; 20 February 2018 – 24 June 2018 |
| 26th 17 November 2015 – 24 June 2018 | Ahmet Aydın; 17 November 2015 – 24 June 2018 | Ayşe Nur Bahçekapılı; 17 November 2015 – 24 June 2018 | Akif Hamzaçebi; 17 November 2015 – 26 October 2017 | Pervin Buldan; 17 November 2015 – 20 February 2018 |
| 25th 23 June 2015 – 1 November 2015 | Naci Bostancı; 9 July 2015 – 1 November 2015 | Şafak Pavey; 9 July 2015 – 1 November 2015 | Koray Aydın; 24 June 2015 – 1 November 2015 | Yurdusev Özsökmenler; 3 July 2015 – 1 November 2015 |
| 24th 28 June 2011 – 7 June 2015 | Sadık Yakut; 28 June 2011 – 7 June 2015 | Ayşe Nur Bahçekapılı; 28 June 2011 – 7 June 2015 | Güldal Mumcu; 10 August 2007 – 7 June 2015 | Meral Akşener; 10 August 2007 – 7 June 2015 |
| 23rd 10 August 2007 – 12 June 2011 | Sadık Yakut; 9 August 2009 – 12 June 2011 | Nevzat Pakdil; 28 November 2002 – 12 June 2011 | Güldal Mumcu; 10 August 2007 – 7 June 2015 | Meral Akşener; 10 August 2007 – 7 June 2015 |
| 23rd 10 August 2007 – 12 June 2011 | Eyyüp Cenap Gülpınar; 10 August 2007 – 9 August 2009 | Nevzat Pakdil; 28 November 2002 – 12 June 2011 | Güldal Mumcu; 10 August 2007 – 7 June 2015 | Meral Akşener; 10 August 2007 – 7 June 2015 |

== See also ==
- Grand National Assembly of Turkey
- Speaker of the Grand National Assembly
