= İsmail Kahraman =

27th Speaker of the Parliament of Turkey

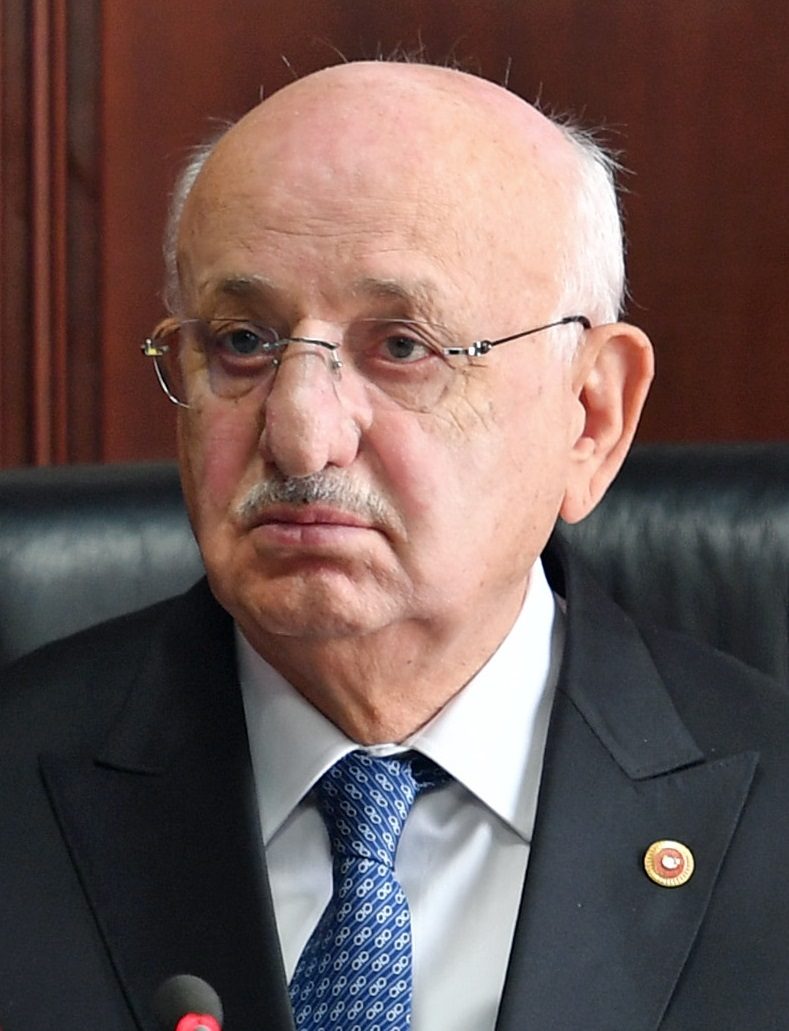
- Kahraman in 2016

27th Speaker of the Grand National Assembly
- In office 22 November 2015 – 9 July 2018
- President: Recep Tayyip Erdoğan
- Deputy: Ahmet Aydın; Ayşe Nur Bahçekapılı; Akif Hamzaçebi (2015-17); Yaşar Tüzün (2017-18); Pervin Buldan (2015-18); Mithat Sancar (2018)
- Preceded by: İsmet Yılmaz
- Succeeded by: Binali Yıldırım

Minister of Culture
- In office 28 June 1996 – 30 June 1997
- Prime Minister: Necmettin Erbakan
- Preceded by: Agah Oktay Güner
- Succeeded by: İstemihan Talay

Member of the Grand National Assembly
- In office 1 November 2015 – 9 July 2018
- Constituency: Istanbul (I) (Nov 2015)
- In office 24 December 1995 – 3 November 2002
- Constituency: Istanbul (1995, 1999)

Personal details
- Born: 7 December 1940 (age 85) İkizdere, Rize, Turkey
- Party: Welfare Party (1995-97); Virtue Party (1997-02); Justice and Development Party (2002-present)
- Children: 4
- Education: Law
- Alma mater: Istanbul University

İsmail Kahraman (born 7 December 1940) is a Turkish politician from the AK Party who served as the 27th Speaker of the Grand National Assembly from 22 November 2015 to 9 July 2018. He has been the Member of Parliament for Istanbul's first electoral district since 1 November 2015, having previously served as an MP for Istanbul between 1995 and 2002. He also served as Minister of Culture from 1996 to 1997 in the government of Necmettin Erbakan as a member of the Islamist Welfare Party.

== Early life and career ==
İsmail Kahraman was born in İkizdere in 1940 and graduated from Istanbul University Faculty of Law. During his youth, he was the president of the Student's Community and of the National Turkish Students' Union. He was a founding member and a chairman of the board of trustees of the Unity Foundation and the Voluntary Foundation of Turkey. In the private sector, he worked as the chairman of the board of directors of numerous companies and became the Undersecretary of the Ministry of Labour. He was one of the founding members of the Recep Tayyip Erdoğan University development foundation and is still the chairman of the board of trustees.

== Minister of Culture ==
İsmail Kahraman was first elected as a Member of Parliament for Istanbul in the 1995 general election as a member of the Welfare Party. The Welfare Party leader Necmettin Erbakan formed a coalition government with the True Path Party in June 1996, with Kahraman becoming the Minister of Culture. The government fell in June 1997 after the military memorandum on 28 February. He was re-elected as an MP in the 1999 general election as part of the RP's successor Virtue Party (FP), but lost his seat in the 2002 general election.

== Speaker of the Grand National Assembly ==
Kahraman re-entered politics and was elected as a Member of Parliament for Istanbul's first electoral district from the Justice and Development Party (AKP) in the November 2015 general election. He was subsequently announced as the AKP's candidate for Speaker of the Grand National Assembly in the November 2015 Parliamentary Speaker election. He was elected speaker in the third round, winning 316 votes and becoming the 27th Speaker of the Grand National Assembly.

== Political views ==
On 13 February 2015, Kahraman attended a career's day at a girls' school in Rize. In his speech, he argued that students should avoid turning to fashion and instead be faithful and devout. He argued that students should follow the example of President Recep Tayyip Erdoğan's mother, Tenzile Erdoğan.

As Speaker of Parliament, one of Kahraman's duties is to pen the new draft constitution for Turkey, which since the founding of the republic after the collapse of Islamic Ottoman Empire has been based on the ideas of Mustafa Kemal Atatürk—Turkish nationalism and Western-style secularism, or separation of the state and religion. On 25 April 2016, Kahraman told a conference of Islamic scholars and writers in Istanbul that "secularism would not have a place in a new constitution," as Turkey was "a Muslim country and so we should have a religious constitution". His call was met with "opposition condemnation and a brief street protest" dispersed with tear gas by riot police. Kahraman later stated these were "personal views" and that the new constitution "should guarantee religious freedoms".

== Personal life ==
He is married and has four children.

== See also ==
- 54th government of Turkey

Political offices
Preceded by İsmet Yılmaz	Speaker of the Parliament; 2015–2018	Succeeded by Binali Yıldırım
