= Utku Çakırözer =

Turkish journalist and politician (born 1970)

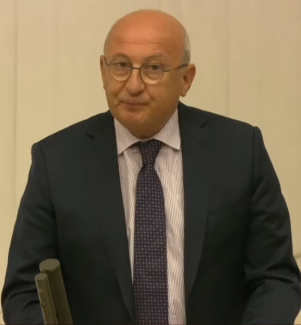
- Incumbent
- Assumed office 7 June 2015
- Constituency: Eskişehir

Personal details
- Born: 1970 (age 55–56) Eskişehir, Turkey
- Party: New Party (since 2026)
- Other political affiliations: Republican People's Party (CHP)
- Education: Computer engineering, Political science ()Bilkent University(

Utku Çakırözer (born 1970) is a Turkish journalist and politician. After working as a journalist, he entered politics, and became a member of the parliament from the Republican People's Party before he transferred to the New Party.

== Journalist career ==
Between 1993 and 2015, Çakırözer worked as a reporter, and served in managerial positions at the dailies Milliyet, Akşam and Cumhuriyet as well as at the television channel Kanal 6. He authored news reports, interviews, and analyses covering foreign policy, defense, and security. He gained professional experience at the Los Angeles Times and The Washington Post during his time in the United States. He received the "Sedat Simavi Award", the "Nezih Demirkent Award", and the "Contemporary Journalists Association Award", as well as the "International Daniel Pearl Press Fellowship" and the "Humphrey Fellowship". Since 2010, he has closely monitored, reported and brought the issue of the situation of journalists, politicians, and other prisoners of conscience to public attention.

== Politician career ==
Çakırözer entered politics joining the Republican People's Party (CHP). At the June 2015 Turkish general election, he won a seat in the 25th Parliament of Turkey (TBMM)as a Deputy of Eskişehir. He served as a member of the Plan and Budget Committee and the Turkish Delegation to the Parliamentary Assembly of the Council of Europe (PACE) also in the 26th and 27th legislative terms. He became a member of the TBMM Foreign Affairs Committee and the Turkish Delegation to the NATO Parliamentary Assembly (NATO-PA), as well as a rapporteur for the NATO-PA Defence and Security Committee.

=== New Party ===
In July 2026, he transferred to the New Party (YP) following its establishment. He was elected to the ten-seat Central Executive Board, and was appointed Vice Chairman in charge of Media Affairs.

== Personal life ==
Çakırözer was born to Hafize and Mehmet Ali in Eskişehir, Turkey in 1970.

After completing the Eskişehir Anatolian High School, he was educated in Computer engineering at Bilkent University in Ankara. After graduation, he studied Political science at the same university, and earned a master's degree. He received theoretical training in digital media at the Philip Merrill College of Journalism, University of Maryland, United States.
