= Gülizar Biçer Karaca =

Turkish politician and lawyer

Gülizar Biçer Karaca MP
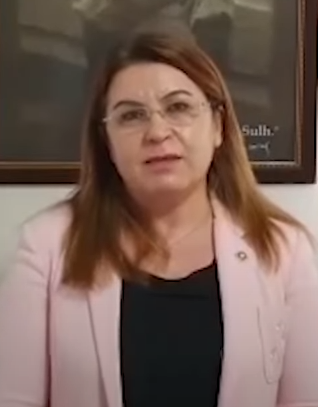

Member of the Grand National Assembly
- Incumbent
- Assumed office 7 July 2018
- Constituency: Denizli (2018, 2023)
- In office 23 June 2015 – 1 October 2015
- Constituency: Denizli (June 2015)

Deputy Speaker of the Grand National Assembly
- In office 3 June 2023 – 14 June 2025
- Preceded by: Haydar Akar
- Succeeded by: Tekin Bingöl

Personal details
- Born: 20 September 1967 (age 59) Denizli, Turkey
- Party: Republican People's Party (CHP)
- Education: Selçuk University
- Occupation: Politician

Gülizar Biçer Karaca (born 20 September 1967) in Denizli, Turkey, is a Turkish politician and lawyer.

== Early life and career ==
Karaca graduated from Selçuk University's Faculty of Law in 1989. She worked as a freelance lawyer, and was the Secretary General of the Denizli Bar Association between 2000 and 2002

== Political career ==
She started politics in the SHP, and later was in charge of managing the youth branches of the CHP in Denizli.

Karaca was a member of the Kınıklı Municipality Council between 1999 and 2004. Between 2005 and 2015, she was the chairman of the Atatürkist Thought Association's Denizli Branch. Karaca was elected to the Grand National Assembly of Turkey in the June 2015 elections, and was subsequently appointed a Clerk of the Presidency Council. She lost her seat in the November snap election. She was then elected a member of the CHP party council in 2016.

Karaca ran and regained a seat in the TBMM in the 2018 elections. And now serves as the CHP's vice chair for nature, and as of 2020 is the deputy chair for human rights.

== Personal life ==
Karaca speaks intermediate level German, is married and has one child.
