= Nimetullah Erdoğmuş =

Turkish politician

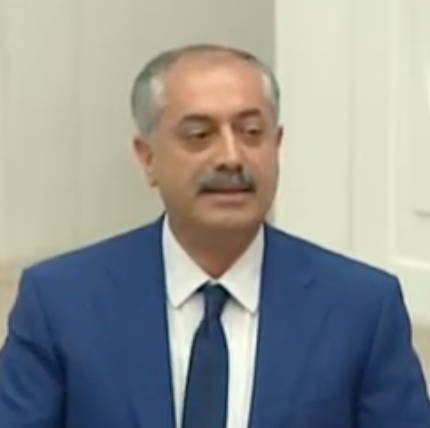
- Erdoğmuş in 2017

Deputy Speaker of the Grand National Assembly
- In office 23 February 2020 – 2 June 2023
- Preceded by: Mithat Sancar
- Succeeded by: Sırrı Süreyya Önder

Member of the Grand National Assembly
- In office 23 June 2015 – 14 May 2023
- Constituency: Diyarbakır (June 2015, November 2015); Şanlıurfa (2018)

Personal details
- Born: Nimetullah Erdoğmuş; 1960 (age 65–66) Bingöl, Turkey
- Party: Peoples' Democratic Party (HDP)
- Children: 5
- Education: Atatürk University

Nimetullah Erdoğmuş (born 1960), is a Turkish politician and theologian, who is currently Deputy Speaker of the Grand National Assembly of Turkey, since 23 February 2020.

== Early life and career ==
Erdoğmuş was born in 1960 in Bingöl. He graduated from the Atatürk University as a theologist and received special training in the field of professional knowledge in Egypt. Additionally, he worked as a provincial mufti in Diyarbakır, Elazığ and Kilis.

== Personal life ==
He is married with five children and can speak Arabic.
