= Aşağıdolay, Bismil =

Village in Turkey

Aşağıdolay
- Neighbourhood
- Location in Turkey
- Coordinates: 37.892°N 40.717°E
- Country: Turkey
- Province: Diyarbakır
- District: Bismil
- Population (2022): 54
- Time zone: UTC+3 (TRT)

Aşağıdolay (Kurdish: Fetla jêrî) is neighbourhood in the municipality and district of Bismil, Diyarbakır Province in Turkey. The village had a population of 54 in 2022.

Located approximately 10 km away from Bismil centre, the settlement has a primary school. The economy of Aşağıdolay mainly depends on agriculture.

== Notable people ==
- Dersim Dağ

== Population ==
Historical population
Year	Pop.	±% p.a.
1985	170	—
1990	245	+7.58%
1997	141	−7.59%
2007	105	−2.90%
2012	99	−1.17%
2017	64	−8.35%
2022	54	−3.34%
Source: Population censuses (1985-1997) and TÜIK (2007-2022)
