= Mustafa Şentop =

29th Speaker of the Parliament of Turkey (born 1968)

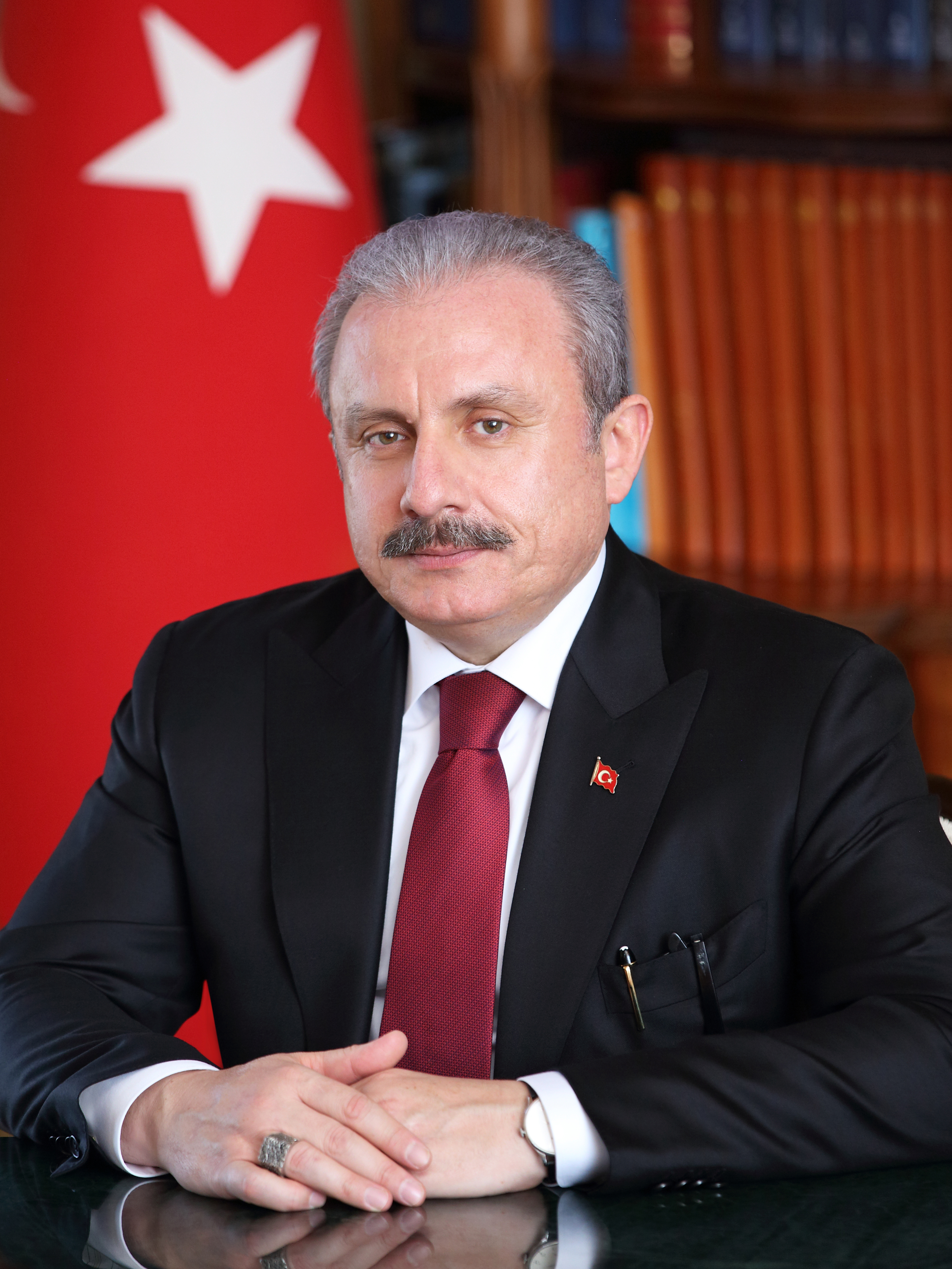

29th Speaker of the Grand National Assembly of Turkey
- In office 24 February 2019 – 2 June 2023
- President: Recep Tayyip Erdoğan
- Deputy: Süreyya Sadi Bilgiç; Levent Gök; Mithat Sancar; Celal Adan
- Preceded by: Binali Yıldırım
- Succeeded by: Numan Kurtulmuş

Deputy Speaker of the Grand National Assembly of Turkey
- In office 12 July 2018 – 24 February 2019
- Speaker: Binali Yıldırım
- Serving with: Levent Gök; Mithat Sancar; Celal Adan
- Preceded by: Ahmet Aydın
- Succeeded by: Süreyya Sadi Bilgiç

Deputy leader of the Justice and Development Party responsible for election campaigns
- In office 30 September 2012 – 12 September 2015
- Leader: Recep Tayyip Erdoğan; Ahmet Davutoğlu
- Preceded by: Zelkif Kazdal
- Succeeded by: Bekir Bozdağ

Member of the Grand National Assembly of Turkey
- In office 12 June 2011 – 2 June 2023
- Constituency: Istanbul (III) (2011, June 2015, Nov 2015); Tekirdağ (2018)

Personal details
- Born: 6 August 1968 (age 58) Tekirdağ, Turkey
- Party: Justice and Development Party
- Education: Istanbul University; Marmara University

Mustafa Şentop (born 6 August 1968) is a Turkish politician from the Justice and Development Party (AKP) who is currently a Member of Parliament and has been in the 24th, 25th, 26th, and 27th legislative terms.

On 24 February 2019, he was elected as the 29th Speaker of the Grand National Assembly.

== Early life and career ==
Mustafa Şentop was born on 6 August 1968 in Tekirdağ. He graduated from Istanbul University Faculty of Law and took a master's degree and a doctorate in the field of public law at Marmara University. In 1993, he started to work in Marmara University Faculty of Law as a research assistant. He got a Ph.D. title in 2002, became an associate professor in 2005, and a professor in 2011. Apart from Marmara University, he gave undergraduate and post-graduate lectures in various universities. He took several administrative functions at Marmara University. Beginning from his university years, he functioned as a writer and editor in various journals and was a member of the editorial board of academic journals and editor of referred journals. He also served as the Chairman of the Istanbul Branch of the Economic and Social Research Centre (ESAM).

== Political career ==
Şentop was elected as a member of the Justice and Development Party (AK Party)'s Central Decision-Making and Administrative Committee at the 4th and 5th Party Congresses. He served as Deputy Chairman of AK Party from 2012 to 2015.

He was elected as Member of Parliament for Istanbul in the 24th, 25th, and 26th legislative terms for Tekirdağ in the 27th legislative term.

He served as Deputy Chairman of the Committee on the Constitution. He took charge at Reconciliation Committee on Constitution as the representative of AK Party. He served as the Chairman of the Committee on Constitution in the 26th Legislative Term.

Serving as the Deputy Speaker of the Grand National Assembly of Turkey in the 27th Legislative Term, on February 24, 2019 he was elected as the 29th Speaker of the Grand National Assembly of Turkey celebrating the centenary of its inauguration in 2020. On July 7, 2020 he was re-elected as Speaker for the second term.

Şentop condemned the peace agreement between Israel and the United Arab Emirates, calling it "disgraceful" and a betrayal of the Palestinian cause.

== Personal life ==
Şentop is fluent in English and Arabic. He is married and has four children.

== Foreign honours ==
- Turkmenistan: Order "For great love for independent Turkmenistan" (2022)

== See also ==
- List of Turkish academics

Political offices
Preceded by Binali Yıldırım	Speaker of the Parliament; 2019–2023	Succeeded by Numan Kurtulmuş
