= Pervin Buldan =

Turkish politician of Kurdish origin

Pervin Buldan MP
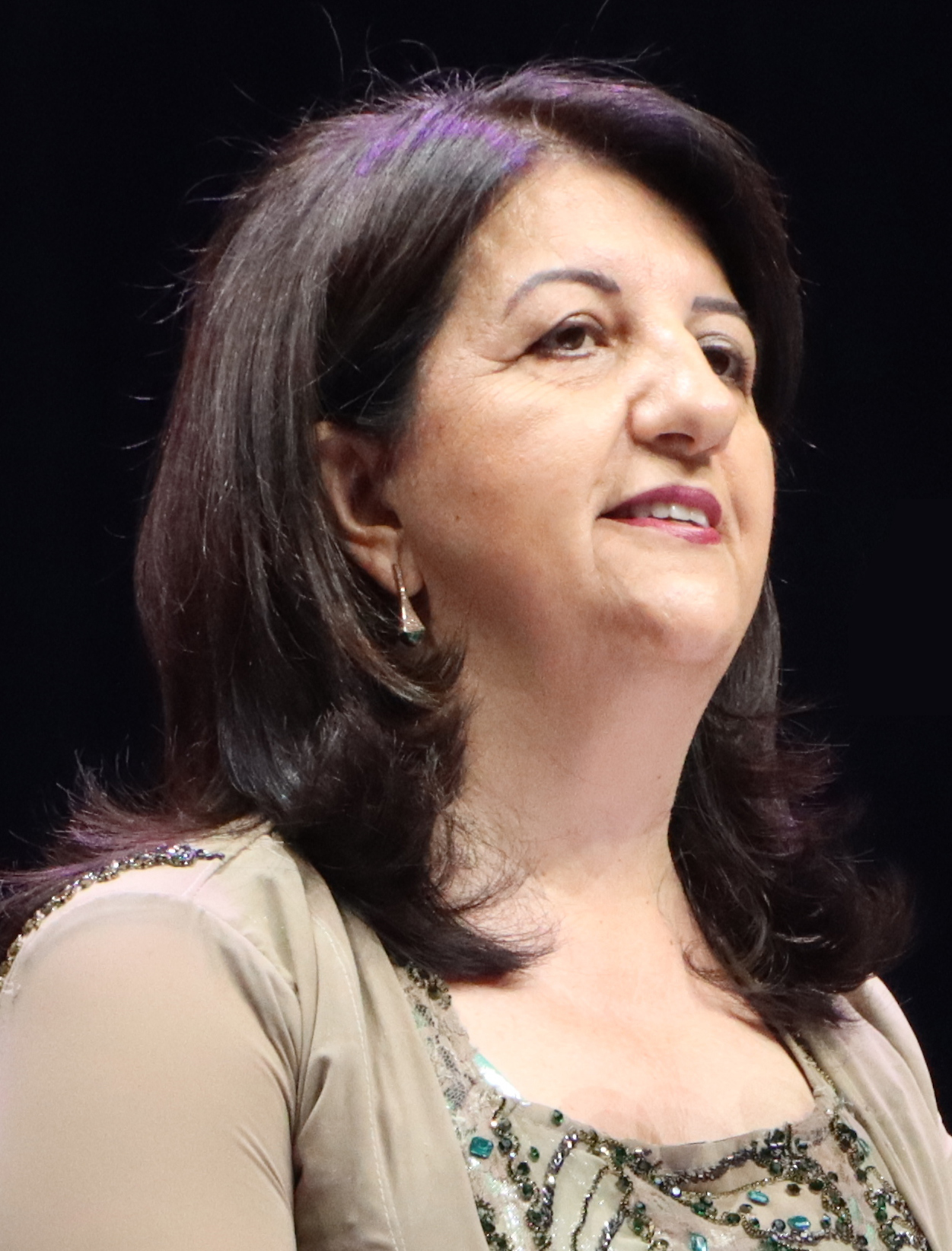

Chairwoman of the Peoples' Democratic Party
- In office 11 February 2018 – 27 August 2023 Serving with Mithat Sancar
- Preceded by: Serpil Kemalbay
- Succeeded by: Sultan Özcan

Deputy Speaker of the Grand National Assembly
- Incumbent
- Assumed office 14 June 2025
- Speaker: Numan Kurtulmuş
- Serving with: Bekir Bozdağ; Tekin Bingöl; Celal Adan
- Preceded by: Sırrı Süreyya Önder
- In office 23 November 2015 – 20 February 2018
- Speaker: İsmail Kahraman
- Serving with: Ahmet Aydın; Ayşe Nur Bahçekapılı; Akif Hamzaçebi
- Preceded by: Yurdusev Özsökmenler
- Succeeded by: Mithat Sancar

Member of the Grand National Assembly
- Incumbent
- Assumed office 23 July 2007
- Constituency: Iğdır (2007, 2011); İstanbul (III) (June 2015, Nov 2015); İstanbul (I) (2018); Van (2023)

Personal details
- Born: 6 November 1967 (age 58) Hakkâri Province, Turkey
- Party: Peoples' Equality and Democracy Party (DEM Party) (2023-present)
- Other political affiliations: Democratic Society Party (2007–2009); Peace and Democracy Party (2009–2014); Peoples' Democratic Party (2014–2023); Independent (during 2007 and 2011 elections)
- Spouse: Savaş Buldan (m. 1987; died 1994)

Pervin Buldan (born 6 November 1967) is a Turkish politician of Kurdish origin. She was a member of the Democratic Society Party (DTP). She was President of Yakay-Der and one of the deputy speakers in the 26th Parliament of Turkey. On 11 February 2018, she was elected co-leader of the Peoples' Democratic Party (HDP) in the party's 3rd ordinary congress.

== Early life ==
She was born in Hakkâri Province in 1967, where she grew up and went to school. She graduated from high school and started work as an official in the local government administration department. At the age of 19, she married her cousin Savaş Buldan. The couple moved to Istanbul in 1990, where Pervin Buldan was a full-time housewife. One year later, Pervin's first child, Necirvan, was born. Savaş Buldan, a well known businessman and opposition supporter, was murdered. He was accused of being a drug dealer and PKK financier by the Turkish National Intelligence Organization (MIT). In 1993, their life changed when Prime Minister Tansu Çiller made a speech declaring that the government had a list of businessmen supporting the Kurdistan Workers' Party (PKK) whom they would hold accountable. After that speech, Savas received a series of threatening telephone calls. The period of unsolved murders against businessmen, including Savaş Buldan, began. On 3 June 1994, Pervin's husband Savaş and his two friends, Adnan Yıldırım and Hacı Karay were abducted after leaving the Hotel Çınar in Yesilköy. The next day their bodies were found in Bolu, at the edge of the river Melen. They carried scars of heavy torture and had been shot in the head. Pervin Buldan gave birth to her daughter, Zelal on the same day, 4 June. Later Pervin Buldan appealed to the European Court of Human Rights (ECHR) which ruled in favor of Buldan and acknowledged there was a violation of Art. 2 and 13 of the European Convention of Human Rights, that there were deficiencies in the investigations around the death of Savas Buldan and ordered Turkey to pay her and her family 26'000€.

== Human rights ==
In 2001 she founded Yakay-Der, the Association of Solidarity and Assistance for the Families of Missing Persons, to help the families of missing persons in Turkey, of which she is now president. Before this she worked for Mag-Der, an association with similar objectives which was closed down by the Turkish authorities because of alleged irregularities with respect to the Turkish Law of Associations.

Yakay-Der grew out of the experience of the Saturday Mothers, who used civil disobedience to gain publicity and bring attention to the ‘disappearances in custody’ cases. These cases became known to the public in Turkey as well as to the world at large. Buldan has described how every week they would hold sit-down demonstrations at the Galatasaray Square to "ask for the people that have disappeared", to the state to talk about the "reality of the disappeared".

== Political career ==
After her husband died, she pursued a political career. In the parliamentary elections of 1999 and 2002 she was a candidate for a seat in the Turkish Parliament but didn't enter as her party didn't make the electoral threshold. In July 2007, Buldan stood as an independent candidate within the Thousand Hopes alliance in the Turkish parliamentary elections and entered the Turkish Parliament as an MP for Iğdır. She was re-elected for a second term in the 12 June 2011 general election. In 2008 an investigation was opened against her for a speech that she made during the Newroz celebrations in Iğdır. In April 2010 she headed a group of MPs who demanded an investigation into the Armenian nuclear power plant at Metsamor, near the Turkish border. In 2013 she paid visits to Abdullah Öcalan at İmralı prison as deputy chair of the Peace and Democracy Party (BDP) as part of the peace process between the PKK and Turkey. On 11 February 2018 she was elected co-chair of the Peoples' Democratic Party (HDP) together with Sezai Temelli. In the Parliamentary Elections of 24 June 2018 she was elected as an MP of Istanbul for the HDP. In February 2020, she was re-elected as party co-chair, with Mithat Sancar replacing Temelli as co-chair. On the 17 March 2021, the state prosecutor Bekir Şahin demanded for her and 686 other HDP politicians a five-year ban to a political activity together with a closure of the HDP due to organizational links with the PKK. In the parliamentary elections of 2023, she was re-elected to the Grand National Assembly, representing Van for the Green Left Party (YSP).

=== Political positions ===
She opposes the so-called one-man rule by the Turkish President Recep Tayyip Erdogan, and is in favor of education in the Kurdish language. She also condemned the replacements of elected mayors by political trustees. In her capacity as co-chair of the HDP she was responsible to meet the presidential candidate of the opposition, Kemal Kılıçdaroğlu and later announce that the HDP will not nominate an own presidential candidate.
