= Habip Eksik =

Turkish politician

Member of the Grand National Assembly
- In office 24 June 2018 – 14 May 2023
- Constituency: Iğdır (2018)

Personal details
- Born: 1985 (age 40–41) Iğdır, Turkey
- Party: Peoples' Democratic Party

Habip Eksik (born 1985) is a Turkish politician who won a seat in the Turkish parliament in June 2018 with the HDP from electoral district of Iğdır.
