= Musa Piroğlu =

Turkish politician

Member of the Grand National Assembly of Turkey
- Incumbent
- Assumed office June 2018
- Parliamentary group: HDP

Personal details
- Born: Musa Piroğlu; 1968 (age 57–58) Hirfanlı, Kırşehir, Turkey
- Education: Dokuz Eylül University
- Occupation: teacher, politician

Musa Piroğlu (born 1968) is a Turkish politician of the Revolutionary Party and a current member of the Grand National Assembly of Turkey for the People's Democratic Party (HDP)

== Early life and education ==
Following his graduation from high school he entered the vocational school at the Dokuz Eylül University in Izmir in 1986. During his studies he had a working accident while being employed as a construction worker. As a result, he was diagnosed with a spinal cord injury and since uses a wheelchair. After the completion of his studies, he worked as a history teacher for fifteen years.

== Political career ==
During his political career, he participated in several parties, such as the Freedom and Solidarity Party (ÖDP) and the Socialist Democracy Party (SDP). He was elected to the Turkish parliament in the parliamentary elections of 2018 for Istanbul representing the HDP. During a protest against the dismissal from parliament of fellow MPs Leyla Güven and Musa Farisoğullari, he attempted to impede water cannon trucks to chase the protesters by blocking the road with his wheel chair, following which he was pushed to the floor by the police. He is the spokesperson of the disabled for the HDP.
