= Kamil Okyay Sındır =

Turkish politician

Kamil Okyay Sındır MP

General Secretary of the Republican People's Party
- In office 24 January 2016 – 12 February 2018
- Leader: Kemal Kılıçdaroğlu
- Preceded by: Gürsel Tekin
- Succeeded by: Akif Hamzaçebi

Member of the Grand National Assembly
- In office 23 June 2015 – 14 May 2023
- Constituency: İzmir (II) (June 2015, Nov 2015, 2018)

Mayor of Bornova
- In office 29 March 2009 – 30 March 2014
- Preceded by: Sırrı Aydoğan
- Succeeded by: Olgun Atila

Personal details
- Born: 20 November 1962 (age 63) İzmir, Turkey
- Party: Republican People's Party
- Education: Ege University; Cranfield University
- Occupation: Academic

Kamil Okyay Sındır (born 20 November 1962) is a Turkish politician who was the General Secretary of the Republican People's Party (CHP) between 24 January 2016 and 12 February 2018. He has been a Member of Parliament for İzmir's second electoral district since 7 June 2015, having been elected in the June 2015 general election and re-elected in the November 2015 election. Between 2009 and 2014, he served as the mayor of Bornova, a district in metropolitan İzmir.

== Early life and career ==
Kamil Okyay Sındır was born on 1 January 1962 in İzmir and graduated from Bornova Anatolia High School in 1980. In 1984, he graduated from the Department of Agricultural Machinery at the Ege University Faculty of Agriculture. He obtained a master's degree in 1988 and obtained a Ph.D at the Cranfield University in the United Kingdom in 1993. Sındır became a Docent in 1997 and a Professor in 2004, working at Ege University Faculty of Agriculture until 2009. He was also an Executive Board member for the Ege University Agricultural Research and Application Centre. Married with two children, he speaks fluent English and semi-fluent German and French.

=== Engineering career ===
Between 1996 and 2008, Sındır was an executive member and President of the Union of Chambers of Turkish Engineers and Architects (TMMOB) Agricultural Engineers Chamber İzmir branch. He also served as the Secretary of the TMMOB İzmir Provincial Co-ordination Board and as the spokesperson for the Academic Careers Chamber Platform. He was also a member of and representative of Turkey to the European Federation for Information Technology in Agriculture (EFITA). Between 2007 and 2010, he served as the President and founding co-ordinator of the Southeastern Europe Agricultural Engineers Union. He served as a delegate to the International Commission of Agricultural and Biosystems Engineering (CIGR) and also as the President of the CIGR Rural Development and Protection of Cultural Heritage Working Group.

=== Social career ===
Sındır was an active member of the İzmir Provincial Human Rights Foundation. He is also a member of the Ataturkist Thought Association (ADD) and the Republican Women's Association (CKD) and served on the Expo 2015 and the Ege-Koop Advisory Boards. In addition, he also served as an Informatics Association of Turkey (TBD) Supervisory Board member and President of the TBD Agricultural Information Working Group.

== Political career ==
Sındır became a member of the Republican People's Party (CHP) in 2007 and applied unsuccessfully to be a CHP parliamentary candidate for the 2007 general election. He was elected as the Mayor of Bornova, a district of İzmir, in the 2009 local elections. As Mayor, he served as the Vice President of Europe Energy Cities, as a member of the Council of European Municipalities and Regions (CEMR) political committee and also as a member of the National Photovoltaic Power Systems Platform.

=== CHP General Secretary ===
Sındır was elected to the Grand National Assembly as a Member of Parliament for İzmir's second electoral district in the June 2015 general election. He was re-elected as an MP in the November 2015 general election. He serves on the parliamentary Agriculture, Forestry and Rural Affairs Commission and is the Commission's CHP group spokesperson. He participated in the United Nations Convention to Combat Desertification (UNCCD) Parliamentary Forum Steering Committee meeting in Bonn, Germany as the representative of the CHP parliamentary group.

Sındır was elected to the CHP Party Council during the party's 35th Ordinary Convention on 17 January 2016. In the new Central Executive Committee formed by party leader Kemal Kılıçdaroğlu on 24 January, Sındır was appointed as the party's new General Secretary.
