= Mithat Sancar =

Turkish politician (born 1963)

Mithat Sancar MP
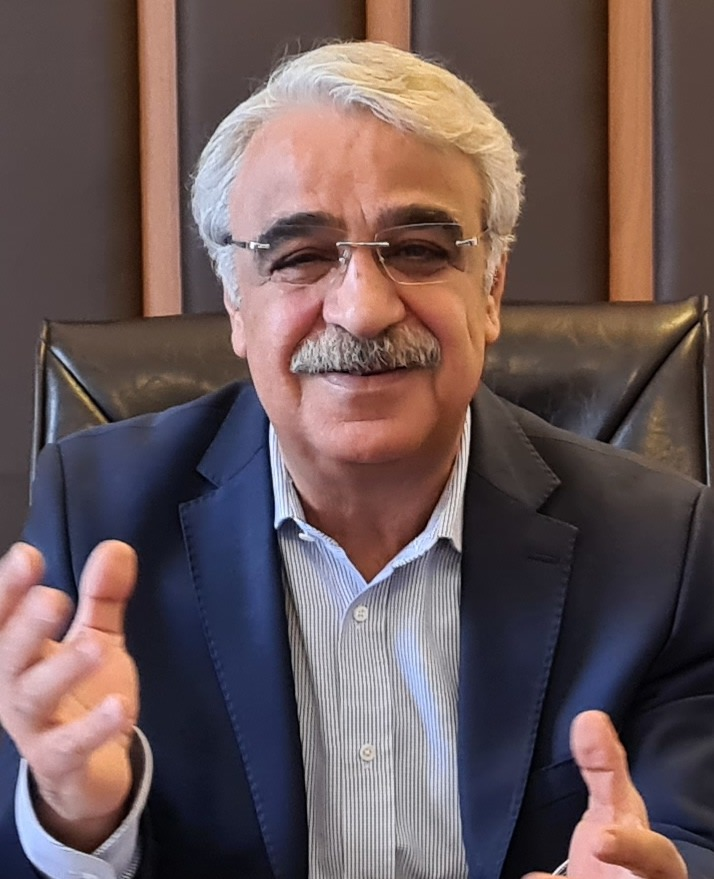
- Mithat Sancar, 2022

Chairman of the Peoples’ Democratic Party
- In office 23 February 2020 – 27 August 2023 Serving with Pervin Buldan
- Preceded by: Sezai Temelli
- Succeeded by: Cahit Kırkazak

Deputy Speaker of the Grand National Assembly
- In office 20 February 2018 – 23 February 2020
- Speaker: İsmail Kahraman; Binali Yıldırım; Mustafa Şentop
- Serving with: 27th Parliament: Mustafa Şentop Levent Gök Celal Adan; 26th Parliament: Ahmet Aydın Ayşe Nur Bahçekapılı Yaşar Tüzün
- Preceded by: Pervin Buldan
- Succeeded by: Nimetullah Erdoğmuş

Member of the Grand National Assembly
- Incumbent
- Assumed office 23 June 2015
- Constituency: Mardin (June 2015, Nov 2015, 2018); Şanlıurfa (2023)

Personal details
- Born: 1963 (age 62–63) Nusaybin, Turkey
- Party: Peoples' Equality and Democracy Party (DEM Party) (2023-present)
- Other political affiliations: People's Democratic Party (HDP) (2015-2023)
- Spouse: Türkan Sancar
- Education: Ankara University
- Profession: Constitutional law scholar

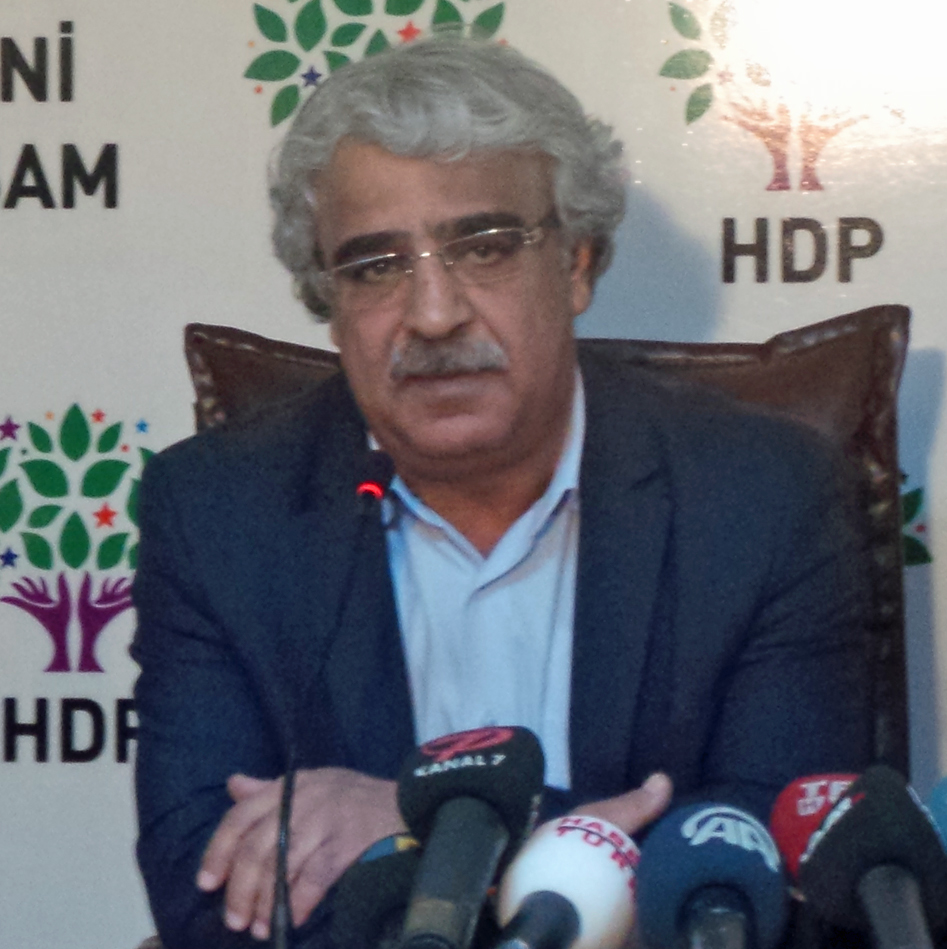
Mithat Sancar in 2015

Mithat Sancar (born 1963) is a Turkish professor of public and constitutional law, newspaper columnist, and translator of Arab descent. He has been an MP for the Peoples' Democratic Party (HDP) in the Turkish parliament since the June 2015 general election and was elected Co-Chair of the party in February 2020.

== Biography ==
=== Early life and academic career ===
Born 1963 in Nusaybin, Sancar attended high school in Diyarbakır before going to Ankara University, where he graduated majoring in public law. In 1995, following his graduation, he received his Ph.D. in constitutional law with a thesis on the "Interpretation of Basic Rights" (Turkish: Temel Hakların Yorumu).

From 1985-1990, he was employed as a research assistant in the Faculty of Law of the Dicle University. Since 1999, he has been a lecturer and since 2007 a full professor at Ankara University. Together with fellow scholar Tanıl Bora, he translated Jürgen Habermas' first major work "Strukturwandel der Öffentlichkeit" into the Turkish language.

=== Political activism ===
Mithat Sancar is one of the founders of the Ankara-based Human Rights Foundation (TİHV, est. 1990) and the Institute of Human Rights (TİHAK, est. 1999). Between 1998 and 2003, Sancar and his colleague Tanıl Bora organized the Human Rights Association's (İHD) annual conference on the Human rights movement in Turkey.

Since 2007, he has been a columnist for the leftist BirGün newspaper. He also wrote for the newspapers Taraf.

== Parliamentary career ==
Ahead of the June 2015 general election, Sancar was asked by HDP leader Selahattin Demirtaş, one of his former students, to run for parliament. After some hesitation, he agreed to suspend his academic career in order to help the HDP over the 10% threshold. Heading the party's electoral list in the Mardin constituency, he was elected a member of the Grand National Assembly. In the subsequent November 2015 snap election and in the General Election 2018 he was reelected. He is currently a Deputy Speaker of the Grand National Assembly.

In November 2015, Sancar and Erol Dora joined fellow MPs Gülser Yıldırım and Ali Atalan in their hunger strike to protest the ongoing state of exception curfew in the border town of Nusaybin, where since November 13 and under the pretext of operating against militant YDG-H members, 70% of the neighborhoods have been cut from electricity, 30% from water supply.

On 23 February 2020, Sancar was elected Co-Chair of the Peoples' Democratic Party along with Pervin Buldan who was re-elected.

== Legal prosecution ==
According to an interview he gave Sancar was accused of having insulted the President for having declared the Turkish government was in part responsible for the terrorist attack against a HDP rally in Ankara and for having also said to the authorities that a conflict should be prevented in Cizre. Then he is also prosecuted for Propaganda for the PKK because he has supported the opening of Kurdish schools. The State Prosecutor at the Court of Cassation in Turkey Bekir Şahin filed a lawsuit before the Constitutional Court on the 17 March 2021, demanding for Sancar and 686 other HDP politicians a five-year ban for political activities. The lawsuit was filed jointly with a request for the HDP to be shut down due to the parties alleged organizational links with the PKK.

== Personal life ==
Sancar is married to Türkan Sancar and the cousin of the Nobel prize in Chemistry laureate in 2015, Aziz Sancar. Sancar considers Arabic his native language, while Kurdish was the language he spoke on the street. Besides these, he speaks Turkish, English and German.

== Books ==
- Devlet Aklı” Kıskacında Hukuk Devleti (2000)
- Mülteciler veİltica Hakkı (2002, co-authored by Bülent Peker)
- Geçmişle Hesaplaşma - Unutma Kültüründen Hatırlama Kültürüne (2007)
