= Oya Ersoy =

Turkish attorney and politician (born 1970)

Oya Ersoy, lawyer, politician and Peoples' Democratic Party (HDP) deputy in the 27th Parliament of Turkey. Oya Ersoy was the Halkevleri General President from 2012 to 2018, and for the first time in the 2018 Turkish parliamentary election has entered parliament as the HDP deputy in Istanbul.
