= Ahmet Kaya (politician) =

Turkish politician

Mayor of Ortahisar
- Incumbent
- Assumed office 5 April 2024
- Preceded by: Ahmet Metin Genç

Member of the Grand National Assembly
- In office 7 July 2018 – 7 April 2023
- Constituency: Trabzon (2018)

Personal details
- Political party: Republican People's Party
- Profession: Politician, mechanical engineer

Ahmet Kaya (born 1971, Trabzon), Turkish politician and mechanical engineer.

== Life and career ==
He was born in Trabzon in 1971. He graduated from Karadeniz Technical University (KTÜ) Faculty of Engineering and Architecture, Department of Mechanical Engineering in 1994. He held positions as SHP Trabzon Youth Branch Board Member, CHP Trabzon Center District Vice President, CHP Trabzon Province Vice President, CHP Trabzon Center District President and CHP Trabzon Ortahisar District Founder President. He held offices as Ataturkist Thought Association Trabzon Branch Chairperson and Union of Chambers of Turkish Engineers and Architects (TMMOB) Chamber of Mechanical Engineers, Trabzon Branch Board Member. He is also a congress member of Trabzonspor.

On 9 April 2023 he was included in deputy candidacy lists of Republican People's Party (CHP) in Trabzon. However, he failed to be elected in Turkish general elections.

He announced on 21 December 2023, that he became the Ortahisar Municipality President candidate from Republican People's Party for 2024 Turkish local elections.
