= Fatma Kaplan Hürriyet =

Turkish politician (born 1982)

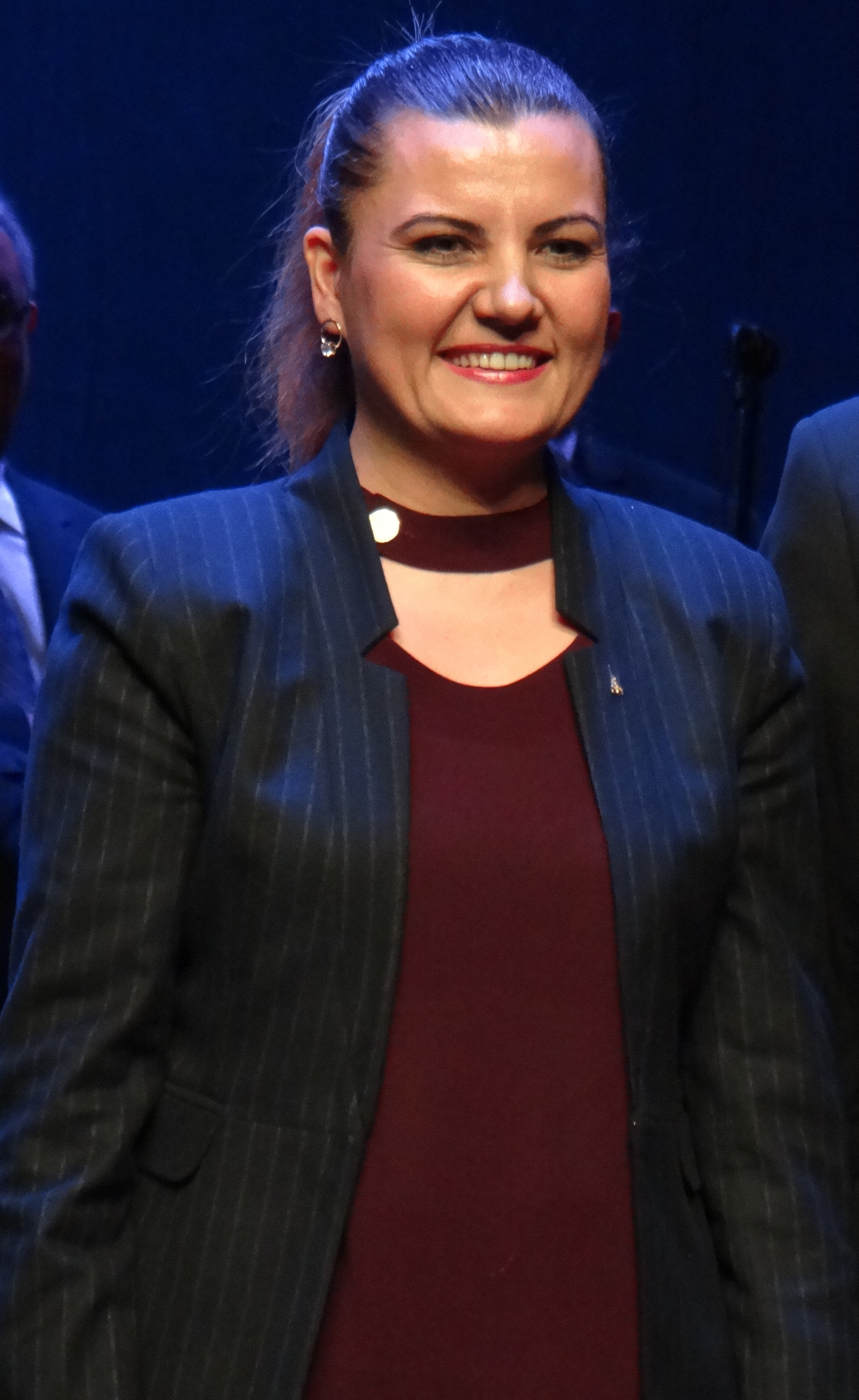
- Kaplan Hürriyet in 2018

Mayor of İzmit
- Suspended
- Assumed office 15 April 2019; Suspended since 24 July 2026
- Preceded by: Nevzat Doğan

Member of the Grand National Assembly
- In office 23 June 2015 – 15 April 2019
- Constituency: Kocaeli (June 2015, Nov 2015, 2018)

Personal details
- Born: Fatma Kaplan; 20 March 1982 (age 44) Çerkezköy, Tekirdağ, Turkey
- Party: Republican People's Party (CHP)
- Other political affiliations: Good Party (2018)
- Spouse: Murat Hürriyet
- Children: 1
- Education: Kocaeli University
- Occupation: Politician and lawyer
- Website: Archived official website

Fatma Kaplan Hürriyet (born 20 March 1982) is a Turkish lawyer and politician from the Republican People's Party (CHP) who served as the Member of Parliament for Kocaeli from June 2015 until her election as Mayor of İzmit in the 2019 local elections.

== Career ==
In January 2017, Fatma Kaplan Hürriyet was allegedly strangled by AKP Parliamentary Group Leader Mustafa Elitaş after she filmed Elitaş and Prime Minister Binali Yıldırım casting open votes at parliamentary voting for constitutional amendments.

Hürriyet was one of 15 CHP MPs to join the Good Party on 21 April 2018. She rejoined the CHP less than a month later.

In the 2019 local elections, Hürriyet was elected mayor of İzmit with 50% of the vote. She was sworn in on April 15.

In the 2024 local elections, she initially withdrew from the nomination due to her disagreements about her party's city council nominee list. However, she was convinced afterwards and won the reelection.

Hürriyet, along with her husband and 20 other individuals were arrested on 20 July 2026. The Ministry of Interior subsequently suspended her from office on 24 July 2026.

== See also ==
- 25th Parliament of Turkey
- 26th Parliament of Turkey
- 27th Parliament of Turkey
