= Abdullah Doğru =

Turkish politician

Member of the Grand National Assembly of Turkey
- Incumbent
- Assumed office 7 July 2018
- Constituency: Istanbul

Personal details
- Party: Justice and Development Party (Turkey)
- Education: Istanbul University Marmara University
- Occupation: Politician, civil servant

Abdullah Doğru is a Turkish politician and former civil servant who has served as a member of Parliament (MP) in the Grand National Assembly of Turkey since 2018.

== Career ==
Doğru was first elected as an MP for Istanbul in the 2018 Turkish general election, representing the Justice and Development Party (AK Party). He was re-elected for a second term in the 2023 Turkish general election.

Doğru holds a degree in public administration from Istanbul University and a master's degree from Marmara University. He served in various roles in the civil service, including as a district governor (kaymakam).
