= Muhammed Avcı =

Turkish politician

Member of the Grand National Assembly of Turkey
- Incumbent
- Assumed office 7 July 2018
- Constituency: Rize

Personal details
- Born: 15 January 1980 (age 46) Rize, Turkey
- Party: Justice and Development Party (AKP)
- Education: Manisa Celal Bayar University
- Occupation: Politician
- Website: x.com/muhammedavci53

Muhammed Avcı (born 15 January 1980) is a Turkish politician who currently serves as a Member of Parliament for Rize from the Justice and Development Party (AKP).

== Early life and education ==
Muhammed Avcı was born in Rize on 15 January 1980. He completed his primary and secondary education in his hometown. He graduated from the Department of History at Manisa Celal Bayar University.

== Political career ==
Avcı began his active political career within the AKP organization in Rize. He was elected as a Member of Parliament for Rize in the 2018 general elections (27th term) and was re-elected in the 2023 general elections (28th term).

In the parliament, he has been a member of the National Defense Commission.

== Personal life ==
Avcı is married and has two children.

== See also ==
- List of MPs elected in the 2023 Turkish parliamentary election
