= Mehmet Rüştü Tiryaki =

Turkish politician (born 1971)

Mehmet Rüştü Tiryaki MP

Member of the Grand National Assembly
- Incumbent
- Assumed office 7 July 2018
- Constituency: Batman (2018, 2023)

Personal details
- Born: 1971 (age 54–55) Diyarbekir, Turkey
- Party: DEM Party (2023–present)
- Other political affiliations: HDP (2015–2023)
- Education: Ankara University Faculty of Law (Ankara University)

Mehmet Rüştü Tiryaki (born 1971, Diyarbakır) is a jurist and a politician of the Peoples' Democratic Party (HDP). He is a member of the Grand National Assembly of Turkey representing Batman.

== Early life and education ==
Tiryaki was born in Diyarbakır in 1971, and trained to be an attorney. He is a graduate of the Ankara University Faculty of Law. He worked at the Ministry of Health as a health officer, and then at the Diyarbakır Health Directorate and Ankara Oncology Hospital. He is a founding member of the Union of Health and Social Workers. He also worked as a legal consultant at KESK and EĞİTİM-SEN.

== Political career ==
Since June 2015, he has been the representative of the Supreme Electoral Council of the HDP. In June 2018, he was elected into the Turkish Parliament for the HDP.

Tiryaki has been a prominent critic of the Turkish government's organisation of elections, such as making it harder for prisoners to vote, and relocating ballot boxes in Kurdish areas, which he said was in order to reduce his party's share of the vote. In May 2019 he also accused the Supreme Electoral Council of Turkey of stealing the data of mentally disabled people in order to cancel the result of the Istanbul Mayoral election. "When you applied for the cancellation of the elections, you said that 20,000 mentally disabled people voted. You stole personal data from the health ministry", BBC Turkish reported Tiryaki as saying.

In November 2019, Tiryaki stated that 16,300 HDP members had been detained and 3,500 imprisoned in Turkey since 2015.
