= Remziye Tosun =

Kurdish politician

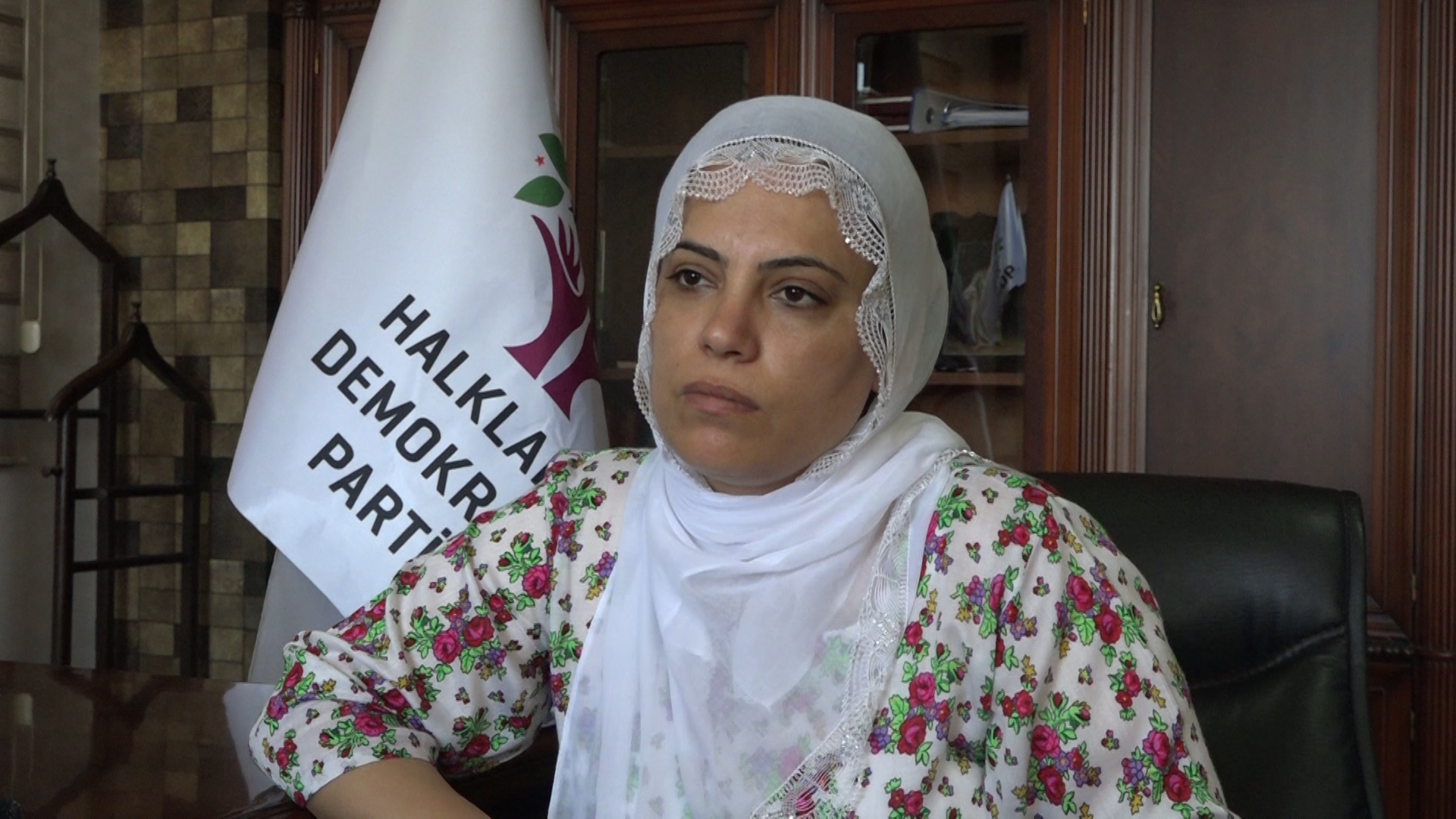

Member of the Grand National Assembly of Turkey
- Incumbent
- Assumed office June 2018
- Constituency: Diyarbakır

Personal details
- Born: July 24, 1981 (age 45) Diyarbakir, Turkey
- Party: Peoples' Democratic Party (HDP)
- Occupation: Politician, primary school teacher

Remziye Tosun (born 24 July 1981) is a Kurdish politician from Turkey who has been a deputy of the Peoples' Democratic Party (HDP) in the Turkish parliament since the parliamentary elections in June 2018. In March 2020, Tosun was charged by prosecutors with "inciting the public to enmity and hatred or humiliating." On 11 September 2020, she was sentenced to 10 years in prison for "membership of a terrorist organisation".

== Biography ==
Tosun was born in Diyarbakir in 1981. She was a primary school teacher, and is listed by the Turkish Grand National Assembly website as being able to speak Kurdish well. She was elected to the Turkish Grand National Assembly as a XXVII term representative for Diyarbakir for the HDP. In March 2020, the Diyarbakır Chief Public Prosecutor's Office opened a criminal case against Tosun, referring to "some expressions used in the announcement that the HDP group made in some neighborhoods in Diyarbakır's central Sur and Yenişehir districts regarding the novel coronavirus (Covid-19)".

On September 11, 2020, Tosun was sentenced to 10 years in jail for "treating wounded Kurdish militants from the outlawed Kurdistan Workers' Party (PKK) during a 2015 Turkish army operation in the southeastern district of Sur." The prosecution Turkish presented seven former PKK members as witnesses, who testified that "Tosun had treated their injuries at her home during the violent clashes of 2016 in Diyarbakır's Sur district, while a PKK member who turned himself in said that Tosun had facilitated his transfer to the armed branches of the PKK, often referred to as "the mountains" due to their location at the southeast Turkish border."
