= İsmail Özdemir =

Turkish politician (born 1985)

Member of the Grand National Assembly
- Incumbent
- Assumed office 7 July 2018
- Constituency: Kayseri

Personal details
- Born: 1985 (age 40–41)
- Party: Nationalist Movement Party

İsmail Özdemir (born 1985) is a Turkish politician serving as a member of the Grand National Assembly since 2018. He has been a substitute member of the Parliamentary Assembly of the Council of Europe since 2018.
