= Tuba Vural Çokal =

Turkish politician (born 1973)

- Born: 1973 (age 52–53); Antalya, Turkey
- Citizenship: Turkey
- Education: Health Sciences Institute of Trakya University
- Known for: member of Turkish parliament
- Political party: Good Party (2018-2020); Justice and Development Party (2020-present)

Tuba Vural Çokal (born 1973, Antalya), is a Turkish politician, member of parliament (the 27th convocation of the Grand National Assembly of Turkey).

== Biography ==
She was born in Antalya in 1973. She graduated from the Department of Physiology, Faculty of Ophthalmology at the Health Sciences Institute of Trakya University. She completed her master's degree in cataract surgery at Baylor University in the United States and at Agarwal Hospital in India.

Upon her return to Turkey, she worked as an ophthalmologist at Istanbul Hospital, as a chief physician at Şişli Eye Protection Foundation, and as a specialist physician at Side Anatolia Hospital. Starting from 2007, she opened her own clinic and continued her work related to eye health there.

== Political career and personal life ==
She was elected to the Grand National Assembly of Turkey as a deputy of Antalya for the 27th term on behalf of the Good Party. Çokal served as the Deputy Chairperson of the Good Party for a while. After disagreements with the Good Party Management, she resigned from her party on February 13, 2020 and joined the AK Party on March 11, 2020.

Çokal, who speaks English at an advanced level and German at an intermediate level, is married and a mother of two children.
