= Ayhan Erel =

Turkish politician

Ayhan Erel in Grand National Assembly of Turkey Aksaray Turkey is a Turkish Parliament. He is member of Iyi Party
