= Aysu Bankoğlu =

Turkish politician (born 1989)

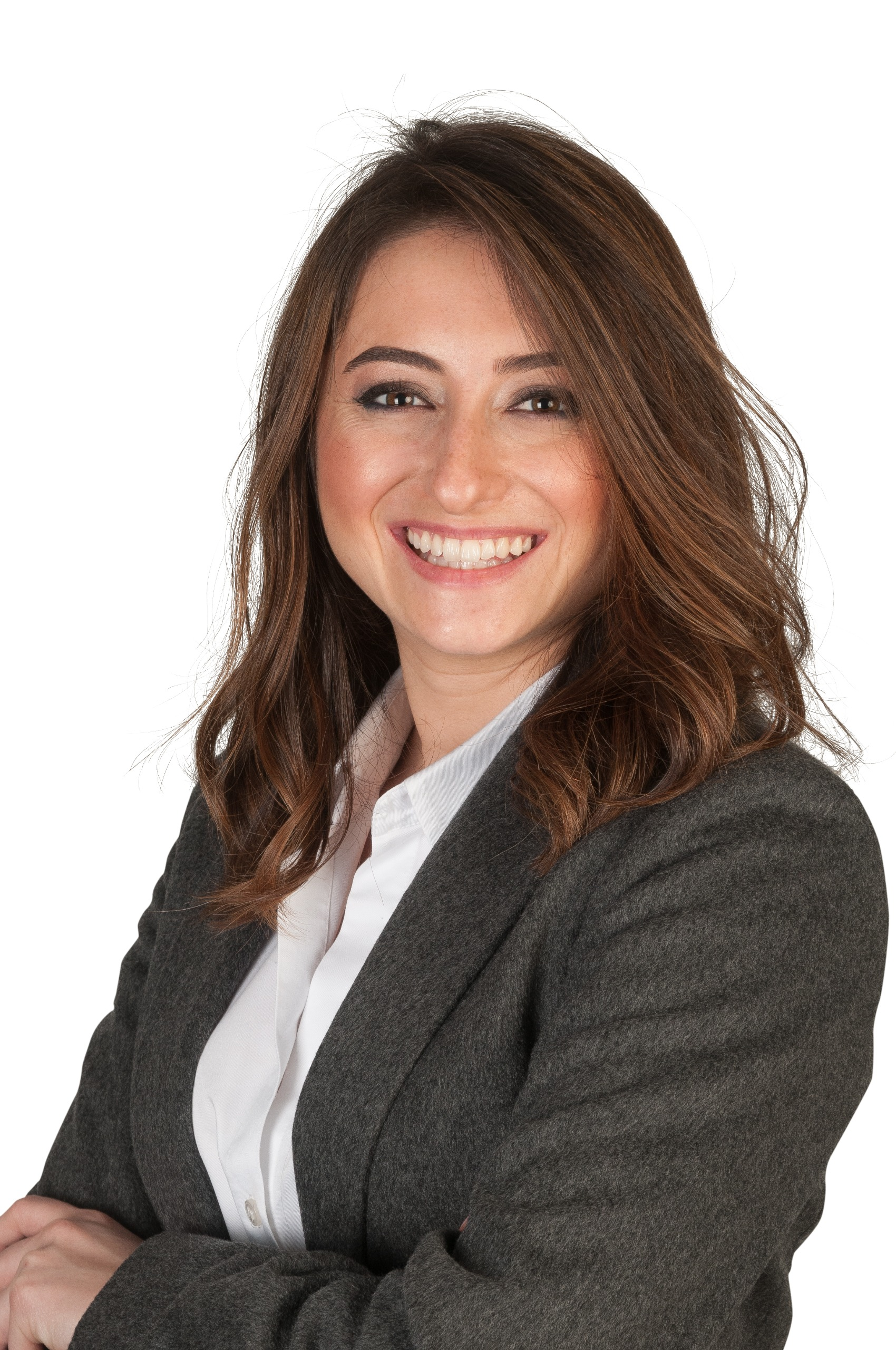
- Bankoğlu in 2024

Member of the Grand National Assembly
- Incumbent
- Assumed office 7 July 2018
- Constituency: Bartın (2018, 2023)

Personal details
- Born: 1989 (age 36–37) Bartın, Turkey
- Party: Republican People's Party

Aysu Bankoğlu (born 1989) is a Turkish politician serving as a member of the Grand National Assembly since 2018. She has been a member of the Parliamentary Assembly of the Council of Europe since 2023.
