= Dersim Dağ =

Turkish politician

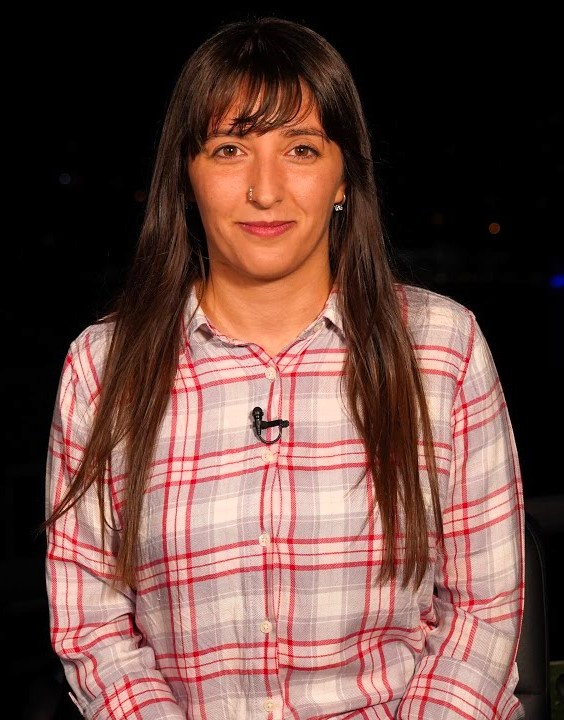
- Dağ in 2023

Member of the Grand National Assembly
- In office 7 July 2018 – 14 May 2023
- Constituency: Diyarbakır (2018)

Personal details
- Born: 2 February 1996 (age 30) Bismil, Diyarbakır, Turkey
- Citizenship: Turkish
- Education: Mardin Artuklu University

Dersim Dağ (born 2 February 1996) is a politician of the Peoples Democratic Party (HDP) and a member of the Turkish Parliament. She was 22 years of age when elected, and at the time was one of the youngest parliamentarians.

== Early life and education ==
Dağ was born into a Kurdish family in Aşağıdolay village in Bismil District and has 12 siblings. Her father was a farmer. In the late 1990s, her family was forced to move Istanbul, where she grew up. She studies Kurdish language at the Artuklu University in Mardin.

== Political career ==
As to her own account, she was born into a political family and hence became interested in politics at a young age. In the parliamentary elections of June 2018, she was elected a Member of the Grand National Assembly of Turkey, representing the HDP for Diyarbakır. With both being 22 years of age, Dağ and Rümeysa Kadak of the Justice and Development Party (AKP) were the youngest MPs elected. In parliament, she is a member of the education, youth and culture commission.

=== Political views ===
She defends press freedom, demands better housing conditions for students at the university, is a supporter of education in the Kurdish language and laments the closure of the Kurdish language educational centers Zarokistan set up by the Municipalities run by the fraternal party of the HDP, the Democratic Regions Party (DBP). On 3 March 2019, she announced she would participate in a hunger strike begun by her fellow HDP MP Leyla Güven in protest of the detention conditions of the former leader of the Kurdistan Workers' Party (PKK) Abdullah Öcalan. The same day the HDP office in Diyarbakır was raided by Turkish authorities and several hunger-strikers were detained. In May Dağ ended her hunger strike as their demands were met and Öcalan was able to receive a visit.

== Personal life ==
Her brother Mazlum Dağ has been sentenced to death for murdering a Turkish diplomat in Erbil, Kurdistan Region.
