= Züleyha Gülüm =

Turkish politician

Member of the Grand National Assembly
- In office 7 June 2018 – 14 May 2023
- Constituency: Istanbul (III) (2018)

Personal details
- Born: 1 January 1971 (age 55) Ardahan
- Party: Peoples' Democratic Party
- Education: University of Istanbul
- Profession: Lawyer, politician

Züleyha Gülüm (born 1 January 1971, Ardahan, Turkey) is a lawyer and politician of the Peoples' Democratic Party (HDP). She is a human and women rights activist and since 2018 she is a member of the Grand National Assembly of Turkey.

== Early life and education ==
Züleyha Gülüm was born in Ardahan, and grew up in Istanbul, where she attended primary and secondary education. She graduated from the law school at the Istanbul University and is a practicing lawyer since 1999.

== Political career ==
In the parliamentary elections of 2018, she was elected to the Grand National Assembly of Turkey representing the HDP for the third electoral district of Istanbul. Since she has voiced support for the hunger-striking musicians of Grup Yorum, the LGBT community and Women rights activists. As the Istanbul Convention on violence against women was still in force, she demanded answers from Zehra Zümrüt Selçuk the Minister of Family, Labor and Social Services on how the convention is applied in Turkey, the relevant authorities cooperated with the LGTB community and women rights organizations. After Turkey withdrew from the convention by presidential decree, she and other HDP MPs organized a protest against the decision. Her appearance in forums defending women rights at times also leads to controversies, most notably with the Nationalist Movement Party, whose representative of the Burhaniye district rallied for support on a raid of a local panel on the 25 November 2021, the International Day for the Elimination of Violence Against Women.
