= İbrahim Yurdunuseven =

Turkish lawyer

İbrahim Yurdunuseven (born 1969 in Afyonkarahisar) is a Turkish lawyer and politician. He is the 27th and 28th-term Justice and Development Party (AK Party) Afyonkarahisar deputy.

== Biography ==
He was born in 1969 in Afyon. After completing his primary and secondary education in Afyon, he graduated from the Ankara University Faculty of Law in 1991.

He has worked as a freelance lawyer in Afyonkarahisar since 1993. He took an active part in various charities in Afyonkarahisar.

He served as a member of the Ak Party's Afyonkarahisar Municipality Council between 2004 and 2009. In 2012, he entered the provincial administration of the Ak Party and assumed the duty of Provincial Election Affairs President. He was appointed as Afyonkarahisar Provincial President on June 24, 2014.

He participated in the 2018 general elections as an AK Party Afyonkarahisar deputy candidate.

He became a candidate again in the 2023 general elections and was elected as the 28th-term parliamentary Deputy President of Afyonkarahisar.
