= Salim Çivitcioğlu =

Turkish politician

Salim Çivitcioğlu (born 20 October 1970 in Cankri Turkey) is a Turkish politician and member of Turkish Parliament. He is also a member of Justice and development party in Turkey and deputy for Çankırı

Salim knows English, also is married and has two Children
