= Zeynep Yıldız =

Turkish politician (born 1992)

Member of the Grand National Assembly
- Incumbent
- Assumed office 7 July 2018
- Constituency: Ankara (II) (2018, 2023)

Personal details
- Born: 1992 (age 33–34) Keçiören, Ankara, Turkey
- Party: Justice and Development Party

Zeynep Yıldız (born 1992) is a Turkish politician serving as a member of the Grand National Assembly since 2018. She has been a member of the Parliamentary Assembly of the Council of Europe since 2018.
