= Hüseyin Yıldız (politician, born 1967) =

20th -Century Turkish Politician

Hüseyin Yıldız MP

Member of the Grand National Assembly
- Incumbent
- Assumed office 23 June 2015
- Constituency: Aydın (June 2015, November 2015, 2018, 2023)

Personal details
- Born: 2 February 1967 (age 58); Kiğı, Turkey
- Political party: Social Democratic Populist Party (1985-1995); Republican People's Party (1995-2018, 2018-present); İYİ Party (2018)
- Children: 1
- Profession: Businessman, politician

Hüseyin Yıldız (born 2 February 1967) is a Turkish politician who has served as a Member of Parliament.

== Early life and education ==
Hüseyin Yıldız was born in the Kiğı district of Bingöl, Turkey, to Süleyman and Humar Yıldız. He completed his high school education and later settled in Didim. Yıldız is married and has one child. He has proficiency in English at an intermediate level.

== Political career ==
Yıldız began his political career in 1985 as a member of the youth wing of the Social Democratic Populist Party (SHP). After the SHP merged with the Republican People's Party (CHP), he continued his political activities within the CHP.

In the June and November 2015 Turkish general elections, Yıldız was elected as a Member of Parliament for Aydın, representing the CHP.

In 2018, Yıldız, along with 14 other CHP deputies, temporarily switched to the İYİ Party to help the party form a parliamentary group ahead of the 2018 general elections. He rejoined the CHP on 10 May 2018.
