= Akif Hamzaçebi =

Turkish politician and economist

Mehmet Akif Hamzaçebi MP

Deputy Speaker of the Grand National Assembly
- In office 19 November 2015 – 26 October 2017
- Speaker: İsmail Kahraman
- Serving with: Ahmet Aydın; Ayşe Nur Bahçekapılı; Pervin Buldan
- Preceded by: Şafak Pavey
- Succeeded by: Yaşar Tüzün

Parliamentary group leader of the Republican People's Party
- In office 1 June 2010 – 24 June 2015
- Leader: Kemal Kılıçdaroğlu
- Preceded by: Kemal Kılıçdaroğlu
- Succeeded by: Özgür Özel

Member of the Grand National Assembly
- In office 3 November 2002 – 3 June 2023
- Constituency: Trabzon (2002, 2007) (Istanbul I) (2011, June 2015, Nov 2015, 2018)

19th Treasurer of Istanbul
- In office 8 September 1997 – 2 March 1999
- Minister: Zekeriya Temizel
- Preceded by: Nurettin Canikli
- Succeeded by: Kadir Boy

Personal details
- Born: 1 December 1953 (age 72) Araklı, Trabzon, Turkey
- Party: Republican People's Party
- Education: Ankara University; Gazi University
- Occupation: Politician
- Website: Official Website

Mehmet Akif Hamzaçebi (born 1 December 1953) is a Turkish politician and economist who has served as a Member of Parliament for Istanbul's 1st electoral district since 12 June 2011. Previously, he served as an MP for the electoral district of Trabzon between 2002 and 2011. He is a member of the Republican People's Party (CHP) of Turkey, having served as the party's spokesperson on planning and budgetary issues as well as a parliamentary group leader between 2010 and 2015.

== Early life and career ==
Akif Hamzaçebi was born on 1 December 1953 in Araklı, Trabzon. He graduated from Istanbul Bakırköy high school in 1970, later graduating from Ankara University Faculty of Political Science in 1974. He received his master's degree from Gazi University Institute of Social Sciences Finance Department, focusing on income, establishments and the integration of taxation.

=== Civil Service ===
He began working at the Ministry of Finance General Directorate of Income. In 1974, he became the Deputy Revenue Office Inspector, rising to become the Revenue Office Inspector on 6 December 1977. Between 1983 and 1984, he received a year's worth of work experience in the United States. On 13 January 1985, he became the Chief Inspector of Revenue. Between 1986 and 1990, he served as the Deputy Treasurer of Istanbul, rising to become the Treasurer of Ankara between 5 February 1990 and 24 June 1993. Between 24 June 1993 and 4 September 1997, he served as the General Directorate of National Real Estate, becoming the Treasurer of Istanbul on 8 September 1997. He left this post on 2 March 1999, becoming the General Directorate of Income on 4 March 1999. He left this post on 3 November 2002 after being elected as a Member of Parliament in the 2002 general election for Trabzon.

While serving as the General Director of Income, Hamzaçebi wrote as a columnist for the Finansal Forum newspaper, focusing on economic issues. He was also a member of the Underwater Sports Federation and the Volleyball Federation.

== Political career ==
Hamzaçebi was elected as an MP in the 2002 general election for Trabzon and was re-elected in the 2007 general election. Between 2002 and 2007, he served on the Parliamentary Committee of Planning and Budgetary Issues. In the general election of 2011, he was elected as an MP for Istanbul's 1st electoral district and was re-elected in the June 2015 general election. He was the CHP spokesperson for planning and budgetary issues between 22 July 2007 and 1 June 2010, after which he served as a CHP parliamentary group leader until 24 June 2015. He was part of the CHP delegation during coalition negotiations following the 2015 general election.

== See also ==
- List of Turkish civil servants
