= Celal Adan =

Turkish politician (born 1951)

Celal Adan MP

Deputy Speaker of the Grand National Assembly
- Incumbent
- Assumed office 12 July 2018
- Speaker: Binali Yıldırım
- Serving with: Mustafa Şentop; Levent Gök; Mithat Sancar
- Preceded by: Ayşe Nur Bahçekapılı

Member of the Grand National Assembly
- Incumbent
- Assumed office 12 June 2011
- Constituency: Istanbul (II) (2011, June 2015, Nov 2015, 2018, 2023)
- In office 18 April 1999 – 3 November 2002
- Constituency: Istanbul (II) (1999)

Personal details
- Born: 10 September 1951 (age 75) Ağrı, Turkey
- Party: True Path Party 1999-2002; Democratic Party 2007-2011; Nationalist Movement Party 2011-present
- Education: Istanbul University
- Occupation: Politician

Celal Adan (born 10 September 1951 in Ağrı) is a Turkish politician. He was elected in 2011 to the 24th Grand National Assembly of Turkey for the Nationalist Movement Party (MHP). Adan had previously represented the True Path Party (DYP) in the 21st Assembly (1999–2002), and later been the party's deputy chairman (renamed Democratic Party in 2007).

In the 1980s and 1990s, Adan had a close relationship with Mehmet Ağar; in the early 1980s, he was tried and acquitted of being involved in the 1980 murder of trade unionist Kemal Türkler.
