= Süreyya Sadi Bilgiç =

Turkish politician

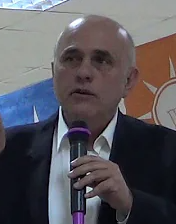

Deputy Speaker of the Grand National Assembly
- Incumbent
- Assumed office 24 February 2019

Member of the Grand National Assembly
- Incumbent
- Assumed office 4 August 2007

Personal details
- Born: Süreyya Sadi Bilgiç; 16 July 1961 (age 64) Ankara, Turkey
- Party: Justice and Development Party

Süreyya Sadi Bilgiç (born on 16 July 1961), is a Turkish politician who is currently one of the deputy speakers of the Grand National Assembly.

== Biography ==
Süreyya Sadi Bilgiç was born in Ankara on 16 July 1961.

He graduated from Istanbul University, Faculty of Economics, Economics-Business-Business-Statistics disciplines. He studied German at the Goethe Institute and LMU Munich in Germany. He worked as an assistant manager, senior manager and business owner in different business lines of the private sector at home and abroad for 23 years. He mainly worked in IT, Advanced Technology Applications, Textile and Retail sectors. XXIII., XXIV. and XXV. Term Isparta deputy.

Süreyya Sadi is the nephew of Sait Bilgiç, who was a DP Isparta deputy from 1950 until the May 27 revolution and was among the deputies on death row in Yassıada. He is the son of Sadettin Bilgiç, who was the 1st(XII) Term Isparta, 2nd(XIII), 3rd(XIV), 4th(XV) and 5th(XVI) İstanbul Deputy and Minister of Transport and National Defense.

He was elected as AK Party Isparta deputy in the 23rd, 24th, 25th, 26th and 27th term parliamentary elections. He served as the Chairman of the Planning and Budget Committee in the 26th and 27th Term of the Grand National Assembly of Turkey. As of 24 February 2019, he is the Deputy Speaker of the Grand National Assembly of Turkey.

== Family ==
He is married and has two children.
