= Musa Farisoğulları =

Kurdish politician in Turkey

Musa Farisogullari

Member of the Grand National Assembly of Turkey
- In office 7 June 2018 – 4 June 2020
- Constituency: Diyarbakır (2018)

Personal details
- Born: 1956 (age 69–70) Genç, Bingöl
- Citizenship: Turkish
- Party: HDP

Musa Farisoğulları (born 1956, Genç, Bingöl) is a Kurdish politician and a member of the Peoples' Democratic Party (HDP).

== Early life and education ==
He attended primary and secondary education as well as the vocational school at Diyarbakır.

== Political career ==
He was involved in Kurdish politics since 1973, been a member of the People's Labour Party (HEP) and also of the Democratic Society Party (DTP). He was banned to engage in political activities for five years in December 2009 following the closure case against the DTP. In the general elections of June 2018, he was elected as a member of the Grand National Assembly of Turkey representing Diyarbakır for the HDP. In parliament he was a member of the Information and Technology commission.

== Political positions ==
He is of the view that Turkish Kurdistan is being colonized, that Turkey wants to do the same to Kurds like they did to the Armenians and that the reason of why the Kurds are still surviving is due to their capabilities to organize. He supports a unity of the four parts of Kurdistan and opposed the Turkish cross-border attack against Afrin in Syria in 2018 and also defended the fact that he attended a funeral of militants of the Peoples' Defense Forces (HPG).

== Prosecution and imprisonment ==
He was sentenced to six years imprisonment within the Kurdistan Communities Union (KCK) main case in September 2019 but was not arrested due to his parliamentary immunity. He was dismissed from parliament together with Enis Berberoğlu and Leyla Güven in June 2020 arrested jointly with Güven in Diyarbakir. Their dismissal was condemned by the Turkey rapporteur of the European Parliament, Nacho Sanchez Amor.

According to his own account, he has been imprisoned for twelve years. Since his arrest in 2019, the communication between the HDP and himself is difficult, as a letter of the HDP was not allowed to be delivered to him on grounds that it contained propaganda of an illegal organization. In March 2022, he was released.

== Personal life ==
Musa Farisoğulları is married and has 3 children.
