= Trabzon (electoral district) =

Electoral district for the Grand National Assembly of Turkey

Coordinates: 40°52′N 39°49′E

- electoral district for the Grand National Assembly of Turkey
- Trabzon shown within Turkey
- Province: Trabzon
- Electorate: 547,016

Current electoral district
- Created: 1920
- Seats: 6 Historical: 8 (2002-2011) 7 (1999-2002) 8 (1995-1999) 6 (1991-1995) 7 (1987-1991) 6 (1983-1987)
- MPs: List: Adil Karaismailoğlu AKP Mustafa Şen AKP Yılmaz Büyükaydın AKP Vehbi Koç AKP Sibel Suiçmez CHP Yavuz Aydın Good
- Turnout at last election: 84.9%
- Representation
- AK Party: 4 / 6
- CHP: 1 / 6
- İYİ: 1 / 6

Trabzon is an electoral district of the Grand National Assembly of Turkey. It elects 6 members of parliament (deputies) to represent the province of the same name for a four-year term by the D'Hondt method, a party-list proportional representation system.

== Members ==
Population reviews of each electoral district are conducted before each general election, which can lead to certain districts being granted a smaller or greater number of parliamentary seats. Trabzon's seat allocation has fluctuated over the last thirty years between six, seven, and eight seats. It was last revised downwards to 6 seats ahead of the 2011 vote.

There are currently six sitting members of parliament representing Trabzon: four from the governing party and two from opposition parties.

MPs for Trabzon, 1999 onwards
Seat	1999 (21st parliament)	2002 (22nd parliament)	2007 (23rd parliament)	2011 (24th parliament)	June 2015 (25th parliament)
MP	Hikmet Sami Türk; DSP	Faruk Nafız Özak; AK Party			Muhammet Balta; AK Party
MP	Şeref Malkoç; FP	Asım Aykan; AK Party		Erdoğan Bayraktar; AK Party	Ayşe Sula Köseoğlu; AK Party
MP	Ali Naci Tuncer; DYP	Aydın Dumanoğlu; AK Party	Safiye Seymenoğlu; AK Party		Süleyman Soylu; AK Party
MP	Nail Çelebi; MHP	Mehmet Akif Hamzaçebi; CHP		Aydın Bıyıklıoğlu; AK Party	Adnan Günnar; AK Party
MP	Orhan Bıçakçıoğlu; MHP	Şevket Arz; CHP	Süleyman Latif Yunusoğlu; MHP	Koray Aydın; MHP	
MP	Ali Kemal Başaran; Anavatan	Kemalettin Göktaş; AK Party		Mehmet Volkan Canalioğlu; CHP	Haluk Pekşen; CHP
MP	Eyüp Aşık; Anavatan	Mustafa Cumur; AK Party		Seat abolished	
MP	No seat	Cevdet Erdöl; AK Party		Seat abolished	

== General elections ==
=== 2018 ===
Abbr.	Party	Votes	%
AKP	Justice and Development Party	274,490	55.1%
CHP	Republican People's Party	74,348	14.9%
MHP	Nationalist Movement Party	66,992	13.5%
IYI	Good Party	56,267	11.3%
SP	Felicity Party	12,495	2.5%
HDP	Peoples' Democratic Party	4,273	0.9%
	Other	8,955	1.8%
Total		497,820	
Turnout		87.35	
source: YSK

=== November 2015 ===
Abbr.	Party	Votes	%
AKP	Justice and Development Party	315,194	66.8%
CHP	Republican People's Party	77,242	16.4%
MHP	Nationalist Movement Party	61,782	13.1%
SP	Felicity Party	6,683	1.4%
HDP	Peoples' Democratic Party	2,422	0.5%
	Other	8,433	1.8%
Total		471,756	
Turnout		85.24	
source: YSK

=== June 2015 ===
Abbr.	Party	Votes	%
AKP	Justice and Development Party	253,418	55.4%
MHP	Nationalist Movement Party	96,086	21%
CHP	Republican People's Party	77,784	17%
SP	Felicity Party	16,467	3.6%
HDP	Peoples' Democratic Party	4,033	0.9%
	Other	9,514	2.1%
Total		457,302	
Turnout		83.50	
source: YSK

=== 2011 ===
2011 Turkish general election: Trabzon
List	Candidates	Votes	Of total (%)	± from prev.
AK Party	Faruk Nafız Özak, Erdoğan Bayraktar, Aydın Bıyıklıoğlu, Safiye Seymenoğlu Yunus Karabela, Salih Cora	266,605	58.65	1.89
CHP	Mehmet Volkan Canalioğlu Ali Türen Öztürk, Sedat Gözaçan, Güzide Uzun, Ahmet Kaya, Ali Koç	83,198	18.30	4.43
MHP	Koray Aydın Halil Memiş, Sabri Sadıklar, Hayriye Nurcan Yazıcı, Rahmi Coşkun, Osman Karaduman	69,500	15.29	1.05
SAADET	None elected	15,841	3.48	−1.99
HAS Party	None elected	7,504	1.65	N/A
DP	None elected	4,759	1.05	−5.19
Büyük Birlik	None elected	1,934	0.43	N/A
HEPAR	None elected	1,013	0.22	N/A
DYP	None elected	923	0.20	N/A
DSP	None elected	720	0.16	−13.71'"`UNIQ−−ref−0000001D−QINU`"'
İP	None elected	688	0.15	−0.02
Nationalist Conservative	None elected	454	0.1	N/A
TKP	None elected	432	0.1	−0.03
Independent	None elected	431	0.09	N/A
MP	None elected	350	0.08	N/A
Liberal Democrat		213	0.05	0.05
Turnout		454,565	84.9	1.35

=== 2007 ===
2007 Turkish general election: Trabzon
List	Candidates	Votes	Of total (%)	± from prev.
AK Party	Faruk Nafız Özak, Cevdet Erdöl, Kemalettin Göktaş, Mustafa Cumur, Safiye Seymenoğlu, Asım Aykan	231,292	56.76	12.83
MHP	Süleyman Latif Yunusoğlu	57,294	14.06	5.66
CHP	Mehmet Akif Hamzaçebi	55,616	13.65	−0.99
DP	None elected	25,410	6.24	−4.48
SAADET	None elected	22,711	5.57	−0.11
BTP	None elected	4991	1.22	−0.07
GP	None elected	3199	0.79	−0.87
HYP	None elected	2611	0.64	N/A
İP	None elected	1192	0.29	−0.02
HEPAR	None elected	977	0.24	−0.05
Independent	None elected	927	0.23	−0.12
İP	None elected	698	0.17	N/A
TKP	None elected	543	0.13	0
ATP	None elected	0	0	N/A
Liberal Democrat	None elected	0	0	N/A
Turnout		407,461	83.34	9.24

=== 2002 ===
2002 Turkish general election: Trabzon
List	Candidates	Votes	Of total (%)	± from prev.
AK Party	Asım Aykan, Faruk Özak, Kemalettin Göktaş, Aydın Dumanoğlu, Mustafa Cumur, Cevdet Erdöl	164,094	43.93	23.9'"`UNIQ−−ref−00000028−QINU`"'
CHP	Akif Hamzaçebi, Şevket Arz	54,668	14.64	9.55
DYP		40,049	10.72	−0.1
MHP		31,364	3.48	−13.61
ANAP		29,925	8.01	−12.26
SAADET		21,208	5.68	−14.35'"`UNIQ−−ref−00000029−QINU`"'
GP		6191	1.66	N/A
DSP		5094	1.36	−16.48
BTP		4826	1.29	N/A
Büyük Birlik		3690	0.99	−0.05
DHP		3013	0.81	0.04'"`UNIQ−−ref−0000002A−QINU`"'
YP		2124	0.57	N/A
YTP		1439	0.39	N/A
Independent		1309	0.35	N/A
İP		1150	0.31	0.18
ÖDP		1065	0.29	0.27
Liberal Democrat		1030	0.28	−0.03
MP		826	0.22	−0.08
TKP		476	0.13	N/A
Turnout		373,541	74.1	−9.18

=== 1999 ===
1999 Turkish general election: Trabzon
List	Candidates	Votes	Of total (%)	± from prev.
MHP	Nail Çelebi, Orhan Bıçakçıoğlu	83,967	22.01	14.29
ANAP	Ali Kemal Başaran, Eyük Aşık	77,328	20.27	−13.11
FP	Şeref Malkoç	76,429	20.03	−6.24'"`UNIQ−−ref−00000030−QINU`"'
DSP	Hikmet Sami Türk	68,085	17.84	6.74
DYP	Ali Naci Tuncer	41,270	10.82	−1.94
CHP		19,416	5.09	−1.4
Büyük Birlik		3986	1.04	N/A
	(People's Democracy Party)	3009	0.79	−0.03
ÖDP		2149	0.56	N/A
Liberal Democrat		1165	0.31	N/A
MP		1137	0.3	−0.17
DP		1030	0.27	N/A
DEPAR		659	0.17	N/A
Labour		530	0.14	N/A
İP		506	0.13	−0.01
SİP		335	0.09	N/A
Turnout		373,541	83.28	1.49

=== 1995 ===
1995 Turkish general election: Trabzon
List	Candidates	Votes	Of total (%)	± from prev.
ANAP	Ali Kemal Başaran, Eyüp Aşık, İbrahim Cebi	119,306	33.38	1.87
RP	İsmail İlhan Sungur, Kemalettin Göktaş, Şeref Malkoç	93,894	26.27	4.02
DYP	Yusuf Bahadır	45,603	12.76	−8.24
DSP	Hikmet Sami Türk	39,659	11.10	−0.55
MHP		27,589	7.72	N/A
CHP		23,203	6.49	−6.66'"`UNIQ−−ref−00000036−QINU`"'
	(People's Democracy Party)	2921	0.82	N/A
MP		1664	0.47	N/A
YDP		1514	0.42	N/A
YDH		1193	0.33	N/A
İP		495	0.14	N/A
YP		313	0.09	N/A
Independent		62	0.02	−0.03
Turnout		357,416	81.79	5

=== 1991 ===
1991 Turkish general election: Trabzon
List	Candidates	Votes	Of total (%)	± from prev.
ANAP	Ali Kemal Başaran, Eyüp Aşık, Fahrettin Kurt	105,682	31.51	−5.32
RP	Kemalettin Göktaş, Koray Aydın	74,623	22.25	11.07
DYP	Mehmet Ali Yılmaz	70,448	21.00	2.21
SHP		44,125	13.15	−3.82
DSP		39,074	11.65	0.52
SP		1312	0.39	N/A
Independent		167	0.05	0.05
Turnout		335,431	76.79	−14.79

=== 1987 ===
1987 Turkish general election: Trabzon
List	Candidates	Votes	Of total (%)	± from prev.
ANAP	Avni Akkan, Eyüp Aşık, Fahrettin Kurt, Hayrettin Kurbetli, İbrahim Çebi, Necmettin Karaduman	123,985	36.83	−13.17
DYP	Mehmet Çakıroğlu	63,271	18.79	N/A
SHP		57,130	16.97	−9.55
RP		37,631	11.18	N/A
DSP		37,479	11.13	N/A
MÇP		14,068	4.18	N/A
IDP		3,119	0.93	N/A
Turnout		336,683	91.57	2.13

=== 1983 ===
1983 Turkish general election: Trabzon
List	Candidates	Votes	Of total (%)	± from prev.
ANAP	Eyüp Aşık, Fahrettin Kurt, Necmettin Karaduman	122,258	50.00	
HP	Mehmet Kara, Yusuf Ziya Kazancıoğlu	63,271	26.52	
MDP	Osman Bahadır	49,988	20.44	
Independent		7437	3.04	
Turnout		244,521	89.44	

== Presidential elections ==
=== 2014 ===
Presidential Election 2014: Trabzon
Party	Candidate	Votes	%
AK Party	Recep Tayyip Erdoğan	274,002	70.09
Independent	Ekmeleddin İhsanoğlu	112,330	28.73
HDP	Selahattin Demirtaş	4,594	1.18
Total votes		290,926	100.00
Rejected ballots		9,114	2.28
Turnout		400,040	71.62
Recep Tayyip Erdoğan win			
