= Haydar Akar =

Turkish politician (born 1963)

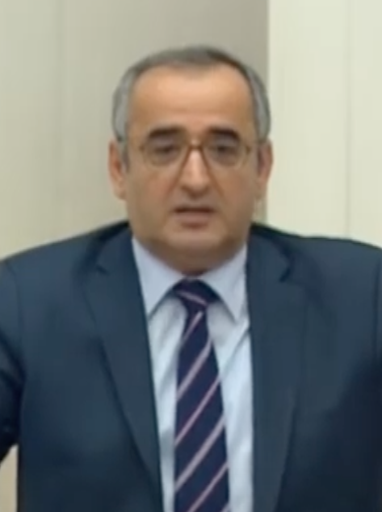

Deputy Speaker of the Grand National Assembly
- In office 16 July 2020 – 3 June 2023

Member of the Grand National Assembly
- In office 12 June 2011 – 3 June 2023
- Constituency: Kocaeli (2011, June 2015, Nov 2015, 2018)

Personal details
- Born: Haydar Akar; 21 December 1963 (age 61); İzmit, Turkey
- Political party: Republican People's Party
- Children: 2

Haydar Akar (born 21 December 1963), is a Turkish politician, who is currently Deputy Speaker of the Grand National Assembly of Turkey since 16 July 2020.

== Biography ==
Haydar Akar was born in İzmit on 21 December 1963.

He graduated from the Department of Mathematics at Middle East Technical University in 1986. He worked at Türk Pirelli Lastikleri AŞ for 23 years.

Akar entered the Grand National Assembly as a Kocaeli deputy in the general elections on 12 June 2011. On 7 June 2015, he was nominated and elected as a Kocaeli deputy candidate from the second row by the CHP.

On 18 June 2020, Akar was elected as the Deputy Speaker of the Assembly.

== Personal life ==
Akar speaks English at a good level. He is married and has two children. He comes from a family of Georgian origin.
