= Yaşar Tüzün =

Turkish businessperson and politician (born 1966)

- Incumbent
- Assumed office 18 November 2002
- Constituency: Bilecik

Personal details
- Born: 18 January 1966 (age 60) Bilecik, Turkey
- Party: New Party (since 2026)
- Other political affiliations: Republican People's Party (CHP)

Yaşar Tüzün (born 18 January 1966) is a Turkish businessperson and politician. After working as a businessman, he entered politics, and became a member of the parliament. He was a member of the Republican People's Party before he transferred to the New Party.

== Business career ==
Tüzünserved as President of the Bilecik Young Businesspeople Association, President of Bilecik Sports Club, 2nd Vice Chairman of the TESK ( Confederation of Turkish Tradesmen and Craftsmen) Bilecik Board of Directors.

== Politician career ==
Tüzün entered politics at an early age. He served in the local politics as member of the Bilecik Municipal Council, Mayor of Bilecik and 2nd Vice President of the Union of Marmara Straits Municipalities. A member of the Republican People's Party (CHP), he serced as his party's Bilecik Central District Chairman and Bilecik Provincial Chairman.

At the 2002 Turkish general election on 18 November, he entered the 22nd Parliament from CHP as a Deputy of Bilecik. He ket his seat in the 23rd, 25th, 26h, 25th and 28th Parliament. He served as a Clerk Member of the Grand National Assembly of Turkey (TBMM) Bureau during the 22nd and 23rd Terms. In November 2017, he became a Deputy Speaker of the TBMM during the 26th Term. Lastly, he was a member of the TBMM Committee on Internal Affairs.

=== New Party ===
In July 2026, he transferred to the New Party (YP) following its establishment. He was elected to the ten-seat Central Executive Board, and was appointed Vice Chairman in charge of Local Administrations.

== Personal life ==
Tüzün was born to Saadet and Mehmet in Bilecik, Turkey on 18 January 1966.

He graduated from a vocational high school for commerce. He is married and has two children.
