= 24th Parliament of Turkey =

- 28 June 2011 – 23 June 2015
- Speaker(s): Cemil Çiçek
- Deputy Speakers: Sadık Yakut; Ayşe Nur Bahçekapılı; Güldal Mumcu; Meral Akşener
- MPs: 550
- Election: June 2011
- Status: AKP majority
- Parties (at start) (Composition shown above): AKP (327); CHP (135); MHP (53); EDÖB Independents (35)
- Parties (at end): AKP (311); CHP (125); MHP (52); HDP (29); Independents (12); DBP (1); ANAPAR (1) eP (1); MEP (1); Vacant (15)
- Prime Ministers: Recep Tayyip Erdoğan; Ahmet Davutoğlu
- Government(s): 61st, 62nd

This is a list of members of Parliament (MPs) elected to the Grand National Assembly for the 24th Parliament of the Republic of Turkey at the 2011 general election.

Electoral districts are ordered according to plate codes of respective provinces, and parties within the electoral districts are ordered according to their nationwide vote (AKP, CHP, MHP, independents). Within the parties, MPs are ordered according to their orders in the party lists.

The list shows the parties from which they were elected, not subsequent changes. It also does not show the vacated seats. 15 seats have been vacated as of 8 February 2015 (4 deaths, 10 elected mayors, 1 elected president

Party	Members	Change	Proportion
Justice and Development Party	327	▼14	59.5%
Republican People's Party	135	▲23	24.5%
Nationalist Movement Party	53	▼18	9.6%
Labour, Democracy and Freedom Block	35*	▲12	6.4%
Total	550		100%
* The Labour, Democracy and Freedom Block was a joint electoral alliance between several left-wing parties such as the Peace and Democracy Party and the Labour Party. They fielded candidates as independents in order to bypass the 10% election threshold applying to partisan candidates, and are listed from hereon as such.

== Adana ==
Member of Parliament	Party
Ömer Çelik	Justice and Development Party
Mehmet Necati Çetinkaya	Justice and Development Party
Necdet Ünüvar	Justice and Development Party
Fatoş Gürkan	Justice and Development Party
Ali Küçükaydın	Justice and Development Party
Mehmet Şükrü Erdinç	Justice and Development Party
Osman Faruk Loğoğlu	Republican People's Party
Ümit Özgümüş	Republican People's Party
Turgay Develi	Republican People's Party
Ali Demirçalı	Republican People's Party
Muharrem Varlı	Nationalist Movement Party
Ali Halaman	Nationalist Movement Party
Seyfettin Yılmaz	Nationalist Movement Party
Murat Bozlak	Independent

== Adıyaman ==
Member of Parliament	Party
Ahmet Aydın	Justice and Development Party
Mehmet Metiner	Justice and Development Party
Muhammed Murtaza Yetiş	Justice and Development Party
Mehmet Erdoğan	Justice and Development Party
Salih Fırat	Republican People's Party

== Afyonkarahisar ==
Member of Parliament	Party
Veysel Eroğlu	Justice and Development Party
Sait Açba	Justice and Development Party
Halil Ürün	Justice and Development Party
Ahmet Toptaş	Republican People's Party
Kemalettin Yılmaz	Nationalist Movement Party

== Ağrı ==
Member of Parliament	Party
Mehmet Kerim Yıldız	Justice and Development Party
Ekrem Çelebi	Justice and Development Party
Fatma Salman Kotan	Justice and Development Party
Halil Aksoy	Independent

== Amasya ==
Member of Parliament	Party
Naci Bostancı	Justice and Development Party
Avni Erdemir	Justice and Development Party
Ramis Topal	Republican People's Party

== Ankara ==
=== Region 1 ===
Member of Parliament	Party
Ali Babacan	Justice and Development Party
Bülent Gedikli	Justice and Development Party
Reha Denemeç	Justice and Development Party
Tülay Selamoğlu	Justice and Development Party
Haluk Özdalga	Justice and Development Party
Yalçın Akdoğan	Justice and Development Party
Fatih Şahin	Justice and Development Party
Ülker Güzel	Justice and Development Party
Sencer Ayata	Republican People's Party
Emrehan Halıcı	Republican People's Party
Emine Ülker Tarhan	Republican People's Party
Aylin Nazlıaka	Republican People's Party
Bülent Kuşoğlu	Republican People's Party
Levent Gök	Republican People's Party
Tuğrul Türkeş	Nationalist Movement Party
Zuhal Topçu	Nationalist Movement Party

=== Region 2 ===
Member of Parliament	Party
Cemil Çiçek	Justice and Development Party
Haluk İpek	Justice and Development Party
Salih Kapusuz	Justice and Development Party
Nurdan Şanlı	Justice and Development Party
Ahmet İyimaya	Justice and Development Party
Cevdet Erdöl	Justice and Development Party
Zelkif Kazdal	Justice and Development Party
Emrullah İşler	Justice and Development Party
Seyit Sertçelik	Justice and Development Party
Ayşe Gülsün Bilgehan	Republican People's Party
İzzet Çetin	Republican People's Party
Sinan Aygün	Republican People's Party
Gökhan Günaydın	Republican People's Party
Mustafa Erdem	Nationalist Movement Party
Özcan Yeniçeri	Nationalist Movement Party

== Antalya ==
Member of Parliament	Party
Vecdi Gönül	Justice and Development Party
Mevlüt Çavuşoğlu	Justice and Development Party
Menderes Türel	Justice and Development Party
Sadık Badak	Justice and Development Party
Hüseyin Samani	Justice and Development Party
Gökçen Enç	Justice and Development Party
Deniz Baykal	Republican People's Party
Osman Kaptan	Republican People's Party
Gürkut Acar	Republican People's Party
Yıldıray Sapan	Republican People's Party
Arif Bulut	Republican People's Party
Tunca Toskay	Nationalist Movement Party
Mehmet Günal	Nationalist Movement Party
Yusuf Ziya İrbeç	Nationalist Movement Party

== Artvin ==
Member of Parliament	Party
İsrafil Kışla	Justice and Development Party
Uğur Bayraktutan	Republican People's Party

== Aydın ==
Member of Parliament	Party
Mehmet Erdem	Justice and Development Party
Semiha Öğüş	Justice and Development Party
Gültekin Kılınç	Justice and Development Party
Bülent Tezcan	Republican People's Party
Metin Lütfi Baydar	Republican People's Party
Osman Aydın	Republican People's Party
Ali Uzunırmak	Nationalist Movement Party

== Balıkesir ==
Member of Parliament	Party
Ahmet Edip Uğur	Justice and Development Party
Mehmet Cemal Öztaylan	Justice and Development Party
Tülay Babuşçu	Justice and Development Party
Ali Aydınlıoğlu	Justice and Development Party
Namık Havutça	Republican People's Party
Nedret Akova	Republican People's Party
Haluk Ahmet Gümüş	Republican People's Party
Ahmet Duran Bulut	Nationalist Movement Party

== Bilecik ==
Member of Parliament	Party
Fahrettin Poyraz	Justice and Development Party
Bahattin Şeker	Nationalist Movement Party

== Bingöl ==
Member of Parliament	Party
Cevdet Yılmaz	Justice and Development Party
Eşref Taş	Justice and Development Party
İdris Baluken	Independent

== Bitlis ==
Member of Parliament	Party
Vedat Demiröz	Justice and Development Party
Vahit Kiler	Justice and Development Party
Hüsamettin Zenderlioğlu	Independent

== Bolu ==
Member of Parliament	Party
Ali Ercoşkun	Justice and Development Party
Fehmi Küpçü	Justice and Development Party
Tanju Özcan	Republican People's Party

== Burdur ==
Member of Parliament	Party
Bayram Özçelik	Justice and Development Party
Hasan Hami Yıldırım	Justice and Development Party
Ramazan Kerim Özkan	Republican People's Party

== Bursa ==
Member of Parliament	Party
Bülent Arınç	Justice and Development Party
Mustafa Öztürk	Justice and Development Party
Hüseyin Şahin	Justice and Development Party
Canan Candemir Çelik	Justice and Development Party
İsmet Su	Justice and Development Party
Mustafa Kemal Şerbetçioğlu	Justice and Development Party
Hakan Çavuşoğlu	Justice and Development Party
İsmail Aydın	Justice and Development Party
Tülin Kara	Justice and Development Party
Bedrettin Yıldırım	Justice and Development Party
Önder Matlı	Justice and Development Party
Sena Kaleli	Republican People's Party
Turhan Tayan	Republican People's Party
İlhan Demiröz	Republican People's Party
Kemal Ekinci	Republican People's Party
İsmet Büyükataman	Nationalist Movement Party
Necati Özensoy	Nationalist Movement Party

== Çanakkale ==
Member of Parliament	Party
Mehmet Daniş	Justice and Development Party
İsmail Kaşdemir	Justice and Development Party
Ali Sarıbaş	Republican People's Party
Serdar Soydan	Republican People's Party

== Çankırı ==
Member of Parliament	Party
İdris Şahin	Justice and Development Party
Hüseyin Filiz	Justice and Development Party

== Çorum ==
Member of Parliament	Party
Salim Uslu	Justice and Development Party
Cahit Bağcı	Justice and Development Party
Murat Yıldırım	Justice and Development Party
Tufan Köse	Republican People's Party

== Denizli ==
Member of Parliament	Party
Nihat Zeybekci	Justice and Development Party
Mehmet Yüksel	Justice and Development Party
Bilal Uçar	Justice and Development Party
Nurcan Dalbudak	Justice and Development Party
Adnan Keskin	Republican People's Party
İlhan Cihaner	Republican People's Party
Emin Haluk Ayhan	Nationalist Movement Party

== Diyarbakır ==
Member of Parliament	Party
Mehmet Mehdi Eker	Justice and Development Party
Mehmet Galip Ensarioğlu	Justice and Development Party
Mine Lök Beyaz	Justice and Development Party
Mehmet Süleyman Hamzaoğulları	Justice and Development Party
Cuma İçten	Justice and Development Party
Oya Eronat	Justice and Development Party
Leyla Zana	Independent
Emine Ayna	Independent
Altan Tan	Independent
Nursel Aydoğan	Independent
Şerafettin Elçi	Independent

== Edirne ==
Member of Parliament	Party
Mehmet Müezzinoğlu	Justice and Development Party
Recep Gürkan	Republican People's Party
Kemal Değirmendereli	Republican People's Party

== Elazığ ==
Member of Parliament	Party
Zülfü Demirbağ	Justice and Development Party
Şuay Alpay	Justice and Development Party
Faruk Septioğlu	Justice and Development Party
Sermin Balık	Justice and Development Party
Enver Erdem	Nationalist Movement Party

== Erzincan ==
Member of Parliament	Party
Sebahattin Karakelle	Justice and Development Party
Muharrem Işık	Republican People's Party

== Erzurum ==
Member of Parliament	Party
Recep Akdağ	Justice and Development Party
Adnan Yılmaz	Justice and Development Party
Fazilet Dağcı Çığlık	Justice and Development Party
Cengiz Yavilioğlu	Justice and Development Party
Muhyettin Aksak	Justice and Development Party
Oktay Öztürk	Nationalist Movement Party

== Eskişehir ==
Member of Parliament	Party
Nabi Avcı	Justice and Development Party
Salih Koca	Justice and Development Party
Ülker Can	Justice and Development Party
Süheyl Batum	Republican People's Party
Kazım Kurt	Republican People's Party
Ruhsar Demirel	Nationalist Movement Party

== Gaziantep ==
Member of Parliament	Party
Hüseyin Çelik	Justice and Development Party
Fatma Şahin	Justice and Development Party
Şamil Tayyar	Justice and Development Party
Abdullah Nejat Koçer	Justice and Development Party
Mehmet Sarı	Justice and Development Party
Mehmet Erdoğan	Justice and Development Party
Derya Bakbak	Justice and Development Party
İbrahim Halil Mazıcıoğlu	Justice and Development Party
Ali Şahin	Justice and Development Party
Ali Serindağ	Republican People's Party
Mehmet Şeker	Republican People's Party
Edip Semih Yalçın	Nationalist Movement Party

== Giresun ==
Member of Parliament	Party
Nurettin Canikli	Justice and Development Party
Mehmet Geldi	Justice and Development Party
Adem Tatlı	Justice and Development Party
Selahattin Karaahmetoğlu	Republican People's Party

== Gümüşhane ==
Member of Parliament	Party
Kemalettin Aydın	Justice and Development Party
Feramuz Üstün	Justice and Development Party

== Hakkari ==
Member of Parliament	Party
Selahattin Demirtaş	Independent
Adil Kurt	Independent
Esat Canan	Independent

== Hatay ==
Member of Parliament	Party
Sadullah Ergin	Justice and Development Party
Orhan Karasayar	Justice and Development Party
Mehmet Öntürk	Justice and Development Party
Adem Yeşildal	Justice and Development Party
Hacı Bayram Türkoğlu	Justice and Development Party
Mehmet Ali Ediboğlu	Republican People's Party
Mevlüt Dudu	Republican People's Party
Refik Eryılmaz	Republican People's Party
Hasan Akgöl	Republican People's Party
Adnan Şefik Çirkin	Nationalist Movement Party

== Isparta ==
Member of Parliament	Party
Süreyya Sadi Bilgiç	Justice and Development Party
Recep Özel	Justice and Development Party
Ali Haydar Öner	Republican People's Party
Süleyman Nevzat Korkmaz	Nationalist Movement Party

== Mersin ==
Member of Parliament	Party
Mehmet Zafer Çağlayan	Justice and Development Party
Ahmet Tevfik Uzun	Justice and Development Party
Nebi Bozkurt	Justice and Development Party
Çiğdem Münevver Ökten	Justice and Development Party
Aytuğ Atıcı	Republican People's Party
Vahap Seçer	Republican People's Party
İsa Gök	Republican People's Party
Ali Rıza Öztürk	Republican People's Party
Mehmet Şandır	Nationalist Movement Party
Ali Öz	Nationalist Movement Party
Ertuğrul Kürkçü	Independent

== Istanbul ==
=== Region 1 ===
Member of Parliament	Party
Recep Tayyip Erdoğan	Justice and Development Party
Egemen Bağış	Justice and Development Party
İdris Güllüce	Justice and Development Party
Erol Kaya	Justice and Development Party
Mihrimah Belma Satır	Justice and Development Party
Mustafa Ataş	Justice and Development Party
Muhammed Çetin	Justice and Development Party
İsmet Uçma	Justice and Development Party
Gürsoy Erol	Justice and Development Party
Alev Dedegil	Justice and Development Party
Mehmet Domaç	Justice and Development Party
Osman Boyraz	Justice and Development Party
Oktay Saral	Justice and Development Party
Metin Külünk	Justice and Development Party
Ahmet Berat	Justice and Development Party
Bilal Macit	Justice and Development Party
Gürsel Tekin	Republican People's Party
Osman Taney Korutürk	Republican People's Party
Mehmet Akif Hamzaçebi	Republican People's Party
Ayşe Eser Danışoğlu	Republican People's Party
Şafak Pavey	Republican People's Party
İhsan Özkes	Republican People's Party
Fatma Nur Serter	Republican People's Party
Mahmut Tanal	Republican People's Party
Müslim Sarı	Republican People's Party
Celal Dinçer	Republican People's Party
Kadir Gökmen Öğüt	Republican People's Party
Engin Alan	Nationalist Movement Party
Durmuşali Torlak	Nationalist Movement Party
Sebahat Tuncel	Independent

=== Region 2 ===
Member of Parliament	Party
Nimet Çubukçu	Justice and Development Party
Ayşe Nur Bahçekapılı	Justice and Development Party
Burhan Kuzu	Justice and Development Party
Ekrem Erdem	Justice and Development Party
Volkan Bozkır	Justice and Development Party
İbrahim Yiğit	Justice and Development Party
Ahmet Kutalmış Türkeş	Justice and Development Party
İsmail Safi	Justice and Development Party
Türkan Dağoğlu	Justice and Development Party
Şirin Ünal	Justice and Development Party
Sevim Savaşer	Justice and Development Party
Hüseyin Bürge	Justice and Development Party
Osman Aşkın Bak	Justice and Development Party
Ahmet Haldun Ertürk	Justice and Development Party
Ahmet Baha Öğütken	Justice and Development Party
Kemal Kılıçdaroğlu	Republican People's Party
Bihlun Tamaylıgil	Republican People's Party
Mustafa Sezgin Tanrıkulu	Republican People's Party
Aydın Ağan Ayaydın	Republican People's Party
Sedef Küçük	Republican People's Party
Ercan Cengiz	Republican People's Party
Haluk Eyidoğan	Republican People's Party
Aykut Erdoğdu	Republican People's Party
Melda Onur	Republican People's Party
Murat Başesgioğlu	Nationalist Movement Party
Ümit Şafak	Nationalist Movement Party
Sırrı Süreyya Önder	Independent

=== Region 3 ===
Member of Parliament	Party
Ömer Dinçer	Justice and Development Party
Abdülkadir Aksu	Justice and Development Party
Ünal Kaçır	Justice and Development Party
Hakan Şükür	Justice and Development Party
Halide İncekara	Justice and Development Party
Mustafa Şentop	Justice and Development Party
Feyzullah Kıyıklık	Justice and Development Party
Tülay Kaynarca	Justice and Development Party
Nureddin Nebati	Justice and Development Party
Mehmet Doğan Kubat	Justice and Development Party
Bülent Turan	Justice and Development Party
Mehmet Muş	Justice and Development Party
Gülay Dalyan	Justice and Development Party
Enver Yılmaz	Justice and Development Party
Harun Karaca	Justice and Development Party
Erdoğan Toprak	Republican People's Party
Umut Oran	Republican People's Party
Süleyman Çelebi	Republican People's Party
Oktay Ekşi	Republican People's Party
Binnaz Toprak	Republican People's Party
Sabahat Akkiraz	Republican People's Party
Faik Tunay	Republican People's Party
Ali Özgündüz	Republican People's Party
Ferit Mevlüt Aslanoğlu	Republican People's Party
Meral Akşener	Nationalist Movement Party
Atila Kaya	Nationalist Movement Party
İhsan Barutçu	Nationalist Movement Party
Abdullah Levent Tüzel	Independent

== Izmir ==
=== Region 1 ===
Member of Parliament	Party
Ertuğrul Günay	Justice and Development Party
Mehmet Tekelioğlu	Justice and Development Party
İlhan İşbilen	Justice and Development Party
İlknur Denizli	Justice and Development Party
Ali Aşlık	Justice and Development Party
Rıfat Sait	Justice and Development Party
Güldal Mumcu	Republican People's Party
Rıza Türmen	Republican People's Party
Oğuz Oyan	Republican People's Party
Hülya Güven	Republican People's Party
Erdal Aksünger	Republican People's Party
Aydın Özcan	Republican People's Party
Oktay Vural	Nationalist Movement Party

=== Region 2 ===
Member of Parliament	Party
Binali Yıldırım	Justice and Development Party
Aydın Şengül	Justice and Development Party
Erdal Kalkan	Justice and Development Party
Nesrin Ulema	Justice and Development Party
Hamza Dağ	Justice and Development Party
Alaattin Yüksel	Republican People's Party
Mustafa Balbay	Republican People's Party
Mehmet Ali Susam	Republican People's Party
Rahmi Aşkın Türeli	Republican People's Party
Aytun Çıray	Republican People's Party
Birgül Ayman Güler	Republican People's Party
Mustafa Moroğlu	Republican People's Party
Ahmet Kenan Tanrıkulu	Nationalist Movement Party

== Kahramanmaraş ==
Member of Parliament	Party
Mehmet Sağlam	Justice and Development Party
Nevzat Pakdil	Justice and Development Party
Mahir Ünal	Justice and Development Party
Yıldırım Mehmet Ramazanoğlu	Justice and Development Party
Sevde Bayazıt Kaçar	Justice and Development Party
Sıtkı Güvenç	Justice and Development Party
Durdu Özbolat	Republican People's Party
Mesut Dedeoğlu	Nationalist Movement Party

== Kars ==
Member of Parliament	Party
Ahmet Arslan	Justice and Development Party
Yunus Kılıç	Justice and Development Party
Mülkiye Birtane	Independent

== Kastamonu ==
Member of Parliament	Party
Hakkı Köylü	Justice and Development Party
Mustafa Gökhan Gülşen	Justice and Development Party
Emin Çınar	Nationalist Movement Party

== Kayseri ==
Member of Parliament	Party
Taner Yıldız	Justice and Development Party
Sadık Yakut	Justice and Development Party
Mustafa Elitaş	Justice and Development Party
Yaşar Karayel	Justice and Development Party
Pelin Gündeş Bakır	Justice and Development Party
Ahmet Öksüzkaya	Justice and Development Party
İsmail Tamer	Justice and Development Party
Mehmet Şevki Kulkuloğlu	Republican People's Party
Yusuf Halaçoğlu	Nationalist Movement Party

== Kırklareli ==
Member of Parliament	Party
Şenol Gürşan	Justice and Development Party
Mehmet Kesimoğlu	Republican People's Party
Turgut Dibek	Republican People's Party

== Kırşehir ==
Member of Parliament	Party
Abdullah Çalışkan	Justice and Development Party
Muzaffer Aslan	Justice and Development Party

== Kocaeli ==
Member of Parliament	Party
Nihat Ergün	Justice and Development Party
Fikri Işık	Justice and Development Party
Sibel Gönül	Justice and Development Party
Muzaffer Baştopçu	Justice and Development Party
Zeki Aygün	Justice and Development Party
İlyas Şeker	Justice and Development Party
Mehmet Ali Okur	Justice and Development Party
Hurşit Güneş	Republican People's Party
Haydar Akar	Republican People's Party
Lütfü Türkan	Nationalist Movement Party

== Konya ==
Member of Parliament	Party
Ahmet Davutoğlu	Justice and Development Party
Kerim Özkul	Justice and Development Party
İlhan Yerlikaya	Justice and Development Party
Ayşe Türkmenoğlu	Justice and Development Party
Cem Zorlu	Justice and Development Party
Hüseyin Üzülmez	Justice and Development Party
Mustafa Baloğlu	Justice and Development Party
Mustafa Kabakcı	Justice and Development Party
Gülay Samancı	Justice and Development Party
Mustafa Akış	Justice and Development Party
Harun Tüfekçi	Justice and Development Party
Atilla Kart	Republican People's Party
Faruk Bal	Nationalist Movement Party
Mustafa Kalaycı	Nationalist Movement Party

== Kütahya ==
Member of Parliament	Party
Soner Aksoy	Justice and Development Party
Hasan Fehmi Kinay	Justice and Development Party
İdris Bal	Justice and Development Party
Vural Kavuncu	Justice and Development Party
Alim Işık	Nationalist Movement Party

== Malatya ==
Member of Parliament	Party
Mahmut Mücahit Fındıklı	Justice and Development Party
Mustafa Şahin	Justice and Development Party
Öznur Çalık	Justice and Development Party
Hüseyin Cemal Akın	Justice and Development Party
Ömer Faruk Öz	Justice and Development Party
Veli Ağbaba	Republican People's Party

== Manisa ==
Member of Parliament	Party
Hüseyin Tanrıverdi	Justice and Development Party
Recai Berber	Justice and Development Party
Uğur Aydemir	Justice and Development Party
Muzaffer Yurttaş	Justice and Development Party
Selçuk Özdağ	Justice and Development Party
Hasan Ören	Republican People's Party
Özgür Özel	Republican People's Party
Sakine Öz	Republican People's Party
Sümer Oral	Nationalist Movement Party
Erkan Akçay	Nationalist Movement Party

== Mardin ==
Member of Parliament	Party
Muammer Güler	Justice and Development Party
Gönül Bekin Şahkulubey	Justice and Development Party
Abdurrahim Akdağ	Justice and Development Party
Ahmet Türk	Independent
Gülser Yıldırım	Independent
Erol Dora	Independent

== Muğla ==
Member of Parliament	Party
Ali Boğa	Justice and Development Party
Yüksel Özden	Justice and Development Party
Tolga Çandar	Republican People's Party
Nurettin Demir	Republican People's Party
Ömer Süha Aldan	Republican People's Party
Mehmet Erdoğan	Nationalist Movement Party

== Muş ==
Member of Parliament	Party
Faruk Işık	Justice and Development Party
Muzaffer Çakar	Justice and Development Party
Sırrı Sakık	Independent
Demir Çelik	Independent

== Nevşehir ==
Member of Parliament	Party
Ahmet Erdal Feralan	Justice and Development Party
Murat Göktürk	Justice and Development Party
Ebubekir Gizligider	Justice and Development Party

== Niğde ==
Member of Parliament	Party
Alpaslan Kavaklıoğlu	Justice and Development Party
Ömer Selvi	Justice and Development Party
Doğan Şafak	Republican People's Party

== Ordu ==
Member of Parliament	Party
İdris Naim Şahin	Justice and Development Party
Mustafa Hamarat	Justice and Development Party
Fatihhan Ünal	Justice and Development Party
İhsan Şener	Justice and Development Party
Harun Çakır	Justice and Development Party
İdris Yıldız	Republican People's Party

== Rize ==
Member of Parliament	Party
Hayati Yazıcı	Justice and Development Party
Hasan Karal	Justice and Development Party
Nusret Bayraktar	Justice and Development Party

== Sakarya ==
Member of Parliament	Party
Hasan Ali Çelik	Justice and Development Party
Ayhan Sefer Üstün	Justice and Development Party
Şaban Dişli	Justice and Development Party
Ayşenur İslam	Justice and Development Party
Ali İhsan Yavuz	Justice and Development Party
Engin Özkoç	Republican People's Party
Münir Kutluata	Nationalist Movement Party

== Samsun ==
Member of Parliament	Party
Mustafa Demir	Justice and Development Party
Suat Kılıç	Justice and Development Party
Cemal Yılmaz Demir	Justice and Development Party
Tülay Bakır	Justice and Development Party
Akif Çağatay Kılıç	Justice and Development Party
Ahmet Yeni	Justice and Development Party
Haluk Koç	Republican People's Party
İhsan Kalkavan	Republican People's Party
Cemalettin Şimşek	Nationalist Movement Party

== Siirt ==
Member of Parliament	Party
Afif Demirkıran	Justice and Development Party
Osman Ören	Justice and Development Party
Gültan Kışanak	Independent

== Sinop ==
Member of Parliament	Party
Mehmet Ersoy	Justice and Development Party
Engin Altay	Republican People's Party

== Sivas ==
Member of Parliament	Party
İsmet Yılmaz	Justice and Development Party
Mesude Nursuna Memecan	Justice and Development Party
Hilmi Bilgin	Justice and Development Party
Ali Turan	Justice and Development Party
Malik Ecder Özdemir	Republican People's Party

== Şanlıurfa ==
Member of Parliament	Party
Faruk Çelik	Justice and Development Party
Seyit Eyyüpoğlu	Justice and Development Party
Mehmet Kasım Gülpınar	Justice and Development Party
Mehmet Akyürek	Justice and Development Party
Zeynep Karahan Uslu	Justice and Development Party
Halil Özcan	Justice and Development Party
Mahmut Kaçar	Justice and Development Party
Abdulkadir Emin Önen	Justice and Development Party
Yahya Akman	Justice and Development Party
Abdulkerim Gök	Justice and Development Party
İbrahim Ayhan	Independent
İbrahim Binici	Independent

== Tekirdağ ==
Member of Parliament	Party
Tevfik Ziyaeddin Akbulut	Justice and Development Party
Özlem Yemişçi	Justice and Development Party
Faik Öztrak	Republican People's Party
Candan Yüceer	Republican People's Party
Emre Köprülü	Republican People's Party
Bülent Belen	Nationalist Movement Party

== Tokat ==
Member of Parliament	Party
Zeyid Aslan	Justice and Development Party
Şükrü Ayalan	Justice and Development Party
Dilek Yüksel	Justice and Development Party
Orhan Düzgün	Republican People's Party
Reşat Doğru	Nationalist Movement Party

== Trabzon ==
Member of Parliament	Party
Faruk Nafiz Özak	Justice and Development Party
Erdoğan Bayraktar	Justice and Development Party
Aydın Bıyıklıoğlu	Justice and Development Party
Safiye Seymanoğlu	Justice and Development Party
Volkan Canalioğlu	Republican People's Party
Koray Aydın	Nationalist Movement Party

== Tunceli ==
Member of Parliament	Party
Kamer Genç	Republican People's Party
Hüseyin Aygün	Republican People's Party

== Uşak ==
Member of Parliament	Party
İsmail Güneş	Justice and Development Party
Mehmet Altay	Justice and Development Party
Dilek Akagün Yılmaz	Republican People's Party

== Van ==
Member of Parliament	Party
Burhan Kayatürk	Justice and Development Party
Fatih Çiftci	Justice and Development Party
Mustafa Bilici	Justice and Development Party
Gülşen Orhan	Justice and Development Party
Kemal Akdaş	Independent
Aysel Tuğluk	Independent
Özdal Üçer	Independent
Nazmi Gür	Independent

== Yozgat ==
Member of Parliament	Party
Bekir Bozdağ	Justice and Development Party
Ertuğrul Soysal	Justice and Development Party
Yusuf Başer	Justice and Development Party
Sadir Durmaz	Nationalist Movement Party

== Zonguldak ==
Member of Parliament	Party
Köksal Toptan	Justice and Development Party
Erdal Candan	Justice and Development Party
Özcan Ulupınar	Justice and Development Party
Mehmet Haberal	Republican People's Party
Ali İhsan Köktürk	Republican People's Party

== Aksaray ==
Member of Parliament	Party
Ali Rıza Alaboyun	Justice and Development Party
Ruhi Açıkgöz	Justice and Development Party
İlknur İnceöz	Justice and Development Party

== Bayburt ==
Member of Parliament	Party
Bünyamin Özbek	Justice and Development Party

== Karaman ==
Member of Parliament	Party
Lütfi Elvan	Justice and Development Party
Mevlüt Akgün	Justice and Development Party

== Kırıkkale ==
Member of Parliament	Party
Beşir Atalay	Justice and Development Party
Oğuz Kağan Köksal	Justice and Development Party
Ramazan Can	Justice and Development Party

== Batman ==
Member of Parliament	Party
Mehmet Şimşek	Justice and Development Party
Ziver Özdemir	Justice and Development Party
Ayla Akat Ata	Independent
Bengi Yıldız	Independent

== Şırnak ==
Member of Parliament	Party
Mehmet Emin Dindar	Justice and Development Party
Hasip Kaplan	Independent
Selma Irmak	Independent
Faysal Sarıyıldız	Independent

== Bartın ==
Member of Parliament	Party
Yılmaz Tunç	Justice and Development Party
Rıza Yalçınkaya	Republican People's Party

== Ardahan ==
Member of Parliament	Party
Orhan Atalay	Justice and Development Party
Ensar Öğüt	Republican People's Party

== Iğdır ==
Member of Parliament	Party
Sinan Oğan	Nationalist Movement Party
Pervin Buldan	Independent

== Yalova ==
Member of Parliament	Party
Temel Coşkun	Justice and Development Party
Muharrem İnce	Republican People's Party

== Karabük ==
Member of Parliament	Party
Mehmet Ali Şahin	Justice and Development Party
Osman Kahveci	Justice and Development Party

== Kilis ==
Member of Parliament	Party
Fuat Karakuş	Justice and Development Party
Ahmet Salih Dal	Justice and Development Party

== Osmaniye ==
Member of Parliament	Party
Suat Önal	Justice and Development Party
Durdu Mehmet Kastal	Justice and Development Party
Devlet Bahçeli	Nationalist Movement Party
Hasan Hüseyin Türkoğlu	Nationalist Movement Party

== Düzce ==
Member of Parliament	Party
İbrahim Korkmaz	Justice and Development Party
Fevai Aslan	Justice and Development Party
Osman Çakır	Justice and Development Party
