= Labour, Democracy and Freedom Bloc =

Labour, Democracy and Freedom Bloc Emek, Demokrasi ve Özgürlük Bloğu
- Founded: 2011
- Dissolved: 2015
- Preceded by: Thousand Hope Candidates (2007)
- Succeeded by: Peoples' Democratic Congress (2015)
- Ideology: Socialism; Minority rights Kurdish nationalism
- Political position: Left-wing
- Colours: Yellow
- Slogan: Demokratik Cumhuriyet (A Democratic Republic)
- Participating parties: Parties: Peace and Democracy Party Revolutionary Socialist Workers' Party Labour Party Equality and Democracy Party Rights and Freedoms Party Socialist Democracy Party Labour Movement Party Workers' Socialist Party Participatory Democracy Party Socialist Unity Movement Workers' Front Socialist Solidarity Platform Democracy and Freedom Movement International Workers' Solidarity Foundation

Website
- Website

The Labour, Democracy and Freedom Bloc (Turkish: Emek, Demokrasi ve Özgürlük Bloğu) was an electoral alliance formed by the pro-Kurdish Peace and Democracy Party (BDP) with several other smaller left-wing parties and political movements in Turkey. The alliance contested the 2011 general election by fielding candidates from participating parties as independents in order to bypass the 10% election threshold needed to win seats in the Turkish Grand National Assembly. The alliance won 5.67% of the vote, initially winning 36 MPs. The Supreme Electoral Council of Turkey later annulled the election of BDP MP Hatip Dicle in Diyarbakır, reducing the alliance's elected MPs to 35. The Bloc fielded 65 candidates in 41 provinces.

The main participants were the pro-Kurdish Peace and Democracy Party, the Labour Party (EMEP) and the Equality and Democracy Party (EDP). The EMEP had formed an alliance with the BDP's predecessor Democratic Society Party in the 2007 general election under the Thousand Hope Candidates banner. The EMEP leader Levent Tüzel, who failed to win election in 2007, was elected as an MP in 2011 as part of the Bloc. Several other smaller parties from left-wing origins were also part of the Bloc, though only the EMEP and the EDP had the right to contest the election as parties. The Labour Party fielded its own candidates as a party in provinces where the Bloc did not contest the election.

The alliance between several left-wing parties paved the way for the establishment of the Peoples' Democratic Congress. The Congress, in which many of the Bloc-supporting groups participated, established a political party named the Peoples' Democratic Party (HDP) in 2012. The HDP contested the June 2015 general election as a party with many of the Bloc parties support, winning 13.12% of the vote and ending the convention of fielding independent candidates for general elections.

== 2011 election ==
The Bloc won 5.67% of the vote, with 35 of their candidates elected. The elected candidates mostly came from the Kurdish south-east of the country.

=== Candidates ===
- Adana: Murat Bozlak
- Adıyaman: Veli Büyükşahin
- Ağrı: Halil Aksoy
- Ankara: Sadrettin Güvener, Gerciş Utaş
- Antalya: İhsan Nergiz
- Ardahan: Yüksel Avşar
- Aydın: Mehmet Bayraktar
- Balıkesir: Turan Cengiz
- Batman: Bengi Yıldız, Ayla Akat Ata
- Bingöl: İdris Baluken
- Bitlis: Hüsamettin Zenderlioğlu
- Bursa: Mehmet Deniz
- Denizli: Kemal Beler
- Diyarbakır: Leyla Zana, Hatip Dicle, Emine Ayna, Nursel Aydoğan, Altan Tan, Şerafettin Elçi
- Erzurum: Sabahattin Yılmaz
- Eskişehir: Hasan Yalçınkaya
- Gaziantep: Akın Birdal
- Hakkari: Selahattin Demirtaş, Adil Kurt, Esat Canan
- Iğdır: Pervin Buldan
- Istanbul: Levent Tüzel, Sırrı Süreyya Önder, Sebahat Tuncel
- İzmir: Erdal Avcı, Mehmet Tanhan
- Kahramanmaraş: Mustafa Mamaklı
- Kars: Mülkiye Birtane
- Kırşehir: Faik Karadaş
- Kocaeli: Emrullah Bingöl
- Konya: Hacı Mehmet Bozdağ
- Malatya: Gani Rüzgar Şavata
- Manisa: Ayşegül Öztürk
- Mardin: Ahmet Türk, Gülser Yıldırım, Erol Dora
- Mersin: Ertuğrul Kürkçü
- Muğla: Şebal Şenyurt
- Muş: Sırrı Sakık, Demir Çelik
- Osmaniye: Kamuran Bablak
- Sakarya: Hüseyin Tanış
- Siirt: Gültan Kışanak
- Şanlıurfa: İbrahim Binici, İbrahim Ayhan
- Şırnak: Hasip Kaplan, Selma Irmak, Faysal Sarıyıldız
- Tekirdağ: Kerem Tosun
- Tunceli: Ferhat Tunç
- Van: Kemal Aktaş, Özdal Üçer, Nazmi Gür, Aysel Tuğluk
- Yalova: İhsan Coşkun

Not all of these candidates are BDP politicians. This includes Labour Party leader Levent Tüzel.

The following candidates were imprisoned due to the investigation into the KCK confederalist organisation.

- Diyarbakır: Hatip Dicle
- Van: Kemal Aktaş
- Şırnak: Selma Irmak, Faysal Sarıyıldız
- Şanlıurfa: İbrahim Ayhan
- Mardin: Gülseren Yıldırım.

=== Elected members ===
- Adana: Murat Bozlak
- Ağrı: Halil Aksoy
- Batman: Bengi Yıldız, Ayla Akat Ata
- Bingöl: İdris Baluken
- Bitlis: Hüsamettin Zenderlioğlu
- Diyarbakır: Leyla Zana, ~~Hatip Dicle~~, Emine Ayna, Nursel Aydoğan, Altan Tan, Şerafettin Elçi
- Hakkari: Selahattin Demirtaş, Adil Kurt, Esat Canan
- Iğdır: Pervin Buldan
- Istanbul: Levent Tüzel, Sırrı Süreyya Önder, Sebahat Tuncel
- Kars: Mülkiye Birtane
- Mardin: Ahmet Türk, Gülser Yıldırım, Erol Dora
- Mersin: Ertuğrul Kürkçü
- Muş: Sırrı Sakık, Demir Çelik
- Siirt: Gültan Kışanak
- Şanlıurfa: İbrahim Binici, İbrahim Ayhan
- Şırnak: Hasip Kaplan, Selma Irmak, Faysal Sarıyıldız
- Van: Kemal Aktaş, Özdal Üçer, Nazmi Gür, Aysel Tuğluk

=== Votes won by participating parties elsewhere ===
Party	Votes			Seats	
Party	Votes	Percentage	Swing	Elected	Seat ±
Labour Party	32,128	0.07%	▼0.01%	0	0

== See also ==
- 24th Parliament of Turkey
- Electoral system of Turkey
- Peoples' Democratic Congress
- Peace and Democracy Party
- Kurdish nationalism
- Thousand Hope Candidates
