= Sebahat Tuncel =

Kurdish politician in Turkey (born 1975)

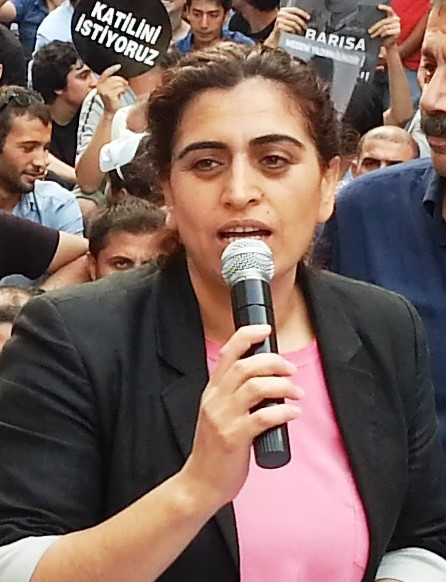

Co-Chair of the Democratic Regions Party
- In office 10 May 2016 – 1 December 2019 Serving with Kamuran Yüksek
- Preceded by: Emine Ayna & Kamuran Yüksek
- Succeeded by: Saliha Aydeniz

Honorary President of the Peoples' Democratic Party
- Incumbent
- Assumed office 22 June 2014
- Serving with: Ertuğrul Kürkçü
- Chairpersons: Figen Yüksekdağ; Selahattin Demirtaş
- Preceded by: Position established

Chairwoman of the Peoples' Democratic Party
- In office 27 October 2013 – 22 June 2014
- Chairman: Ertuğrul Kürkçü
- Preceded by: Fatma Gök
- Succeeded by: Figen Yüksekdağ

Spokeswoman of the Peoples' Democratic Congress
- In office 16 October 2011 – 7 June 2015
- Spokesman: Ertuğrul Kürkçü
- Preceded by: Position established

Member of the Grand National Assembly
- In office 22 July 2007 – 7 June 2015
- Constituency: İstanbul (III) (2007); İstanbul (I) (2011)

Personal details
- Born: 5 July 1975 (age 51) Yazıhan, Turkey
- Party: People's Democracy Party (1998–2003); Democratic People's Party (2003–2005); Democratic Society Party (2005–2008); Peace and Democracy Party (2008–2012); Peoples' Democratic Party (2012–2014); Democratic Regions Party (2014–present)
- Other political affiliations: Peoples' Democratic Congress (HDK)
- Education: Mersin University

Sebahat Tuncel (born 5 July 1975) is a Turkish politician of Kurdish origin, women's rights advocate, former nurse and member of the Parliament in Turkey. She was elected a member of parliament while being in prison.

== Early life and education ==
She was born in Yazıhan and studied cartography and land surveying in Mersin University, before beginning her political career through the Women's Branch of the People's Democracy Party (HADEP) in 1998. After she was involved in the foundation of the Democratic Society Party (DTP), she became the spokesperson of its women's assembly. Subsequently, she was the vice co-chairperson and Istanbul deputy of the DTP, She has also worked with international organizations such as United Nations Development Programme (UNDP) and Amnesty International (AI).

== Political career ==
She was arrested on 5 November 2006 for alleged membership in the PKK. But after she ran as an independent candidate within the Thousand Hopes alliance for the parliamentary elections from prison and after winning a seat in Istanbul with 93,000 votes, she was released from custody in July 2007. She was elected to the Grand National Assembly of Turkey from prison to the surprise of many. In the parliamentary election of 2011, she was an independent candidate to parliament supported by the Labor, Democracy and Freedom Block, and was elected as an MP for Istanbul's first electoral district. After her election she led a movement which criticized the fact that Hatip Dicle was not allowed to assume his seat in parliament even though he was elected. In 2013 she was elected co-chair of the HDP together with Ertuğrul Kürkçü. In May 2016 she was elected co-chair of the Democratic Regions Party (DBP) together with Kamuran Yüksek. As by September 2016 several mayors of the DBP were removed, the DBP co-chair Tunnel invited the mayors to work on for the people from the parties buildings instead of the municipalities.

== Political views ==
She demands a further improvements for the cultural rights of the Kurdish population in Turkey and accused the AKP and the Kemalist Republican People's Party of stalling negotiations on the matter.

=== Recognition of Armenian genocide ===
Sebahat Tuncel has made a number of statements for Turkey to recognize the Armenian genocide. In November 2014, she presented the Armenian Genocide Recognition Bill in the Turkish parliament, urging the Turkish President Recep Tayyip Erdoğan to publicly apologize for the Armenian Genocide.

== Prosecution and imprisonment ==
On 4 October 2016 she was taken into custody and arrested in November 2016. According to the International Law Bureau the prosecution demanded 130 years of imprisonment for terror related charges due to her membership in the legal party DTP and 16 statements and speeches she made during meetings and press conferences she held before meetings of the DBP. On 5 January 2018 she was sentenced to 2 years and three months in prison. In January 2019 she joined and ongoing hunger strike of Leyla Güven demanding the end of the isolation of Abdullah Öcalan. In February 2019, while still in hunger strike, she was sentenced to 15 years in prison for being a member of a terrorist organization and making propaganda for a terrorist organization. In October 2020, she was included into investigations into the Kobanî protests of 2014.

In September 2020, another sentence under the controversial Article 299 of Turkey's penal code over 11 months followed for insulting the Turkish president Recep Tayyip Erdoğan. The sentence was given for calling Erdoğan an "enemy of women" in a speech in 2016. She had made this statement after two controversial statements of Erdoğan where in 2014 he had publicly said "women are not equal to men" and in 2016 he said "women who reject motherhood are deficient and incomplete". On 17 March 2021, the state prosecutor Bekir Şahin demanded for Tuncel and 686 other HDP politicians a five-year ban to engage in politics together with a closure of the HDP due to the parties alleged organizational unity with the PKK. She was released on 16 May 2024.
