= Faysal Sarıyıldız =

Turkish politician (born 1975)

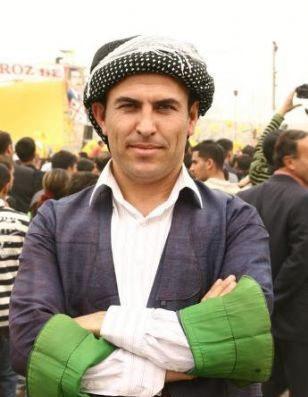

Assembly Member for Şırnak
- In office 2014–2015
- Parliamentary group: Peace and Democracy Party
- In office June 2015 – November 2015
- Parliamentary group: Peoples' Democratic Party
- In office November 2015 – September 2017
- Parliamentary group: Peoples' Democratic Party

Personal details
- Born: 10 April 1975 (age 51) Cizre, Turkey
- Education: Harran University

Faysal Sarıyıldız (born 10 April 1975, Cizre) is a Kurdish politician of the Peoples' Democratic Party (HDP) and a former Member of Parliament representing the Sırnak Province, Turkey.

== Education and early life ==
He studied mechanical engineering at the University of Harran in the province of Sanliurfa, and reported for the Kurdish newspapers Ülkede Gündem and Özgür Bakış. He was arrested in April 2009 and prosecuted for being a member of the Kurdistan Communities Union (KCK).

== Political career ==
He was elected to parliament in June 2011 as an independent supported by the Labour, Democracy and Freedom Bloc, but was denied to assume his post as the court ruled the parliamentary immunity does not apply in his case. In January 2014, after a court decided the imprisonment their imprisonment violated their human rights, since they were elected as MPs, he was released from prison together with Selma Irmak, Gülser Yıldırım, Kemal Aktas and Ibrahim Ayhan. Following they delivered their oath in parliament. He was re-elected as an MP representing Şırnak in the General elections of June 2015 and the snap elections of November 2015, then for the HDP. Sarıyıldiz was defending the wounded during the curfew in Cizre in the winter of 2015-16 and called the UN for help. In April 2016 he left Turkey for exile and Turkey issued an arrest warrant for him.

== In exile ==
While in exile he was further on involved in the defense of Kurdish rights, and also kept being an MP for the Turkish Parliament. On 5 June 2017, the Turkish Interior Ministry announced that 130 people who are outside the country while being suspected of militant links will lose their citizenship unless they return to Turkey within three months and meet government standards. Among the 130 people figured also Faysal Sarıyildız. On the 7 September 2017 he and Tuğba Hezer Öztürk were relieved from their duties in parliament for "absenteeism" by the vote of the majority of the parliamentarians. The next day the Constitutional Court confirmed their dismissal.
