= Tuğba Hezer Öztürk =

Turkish politician (born 1989)

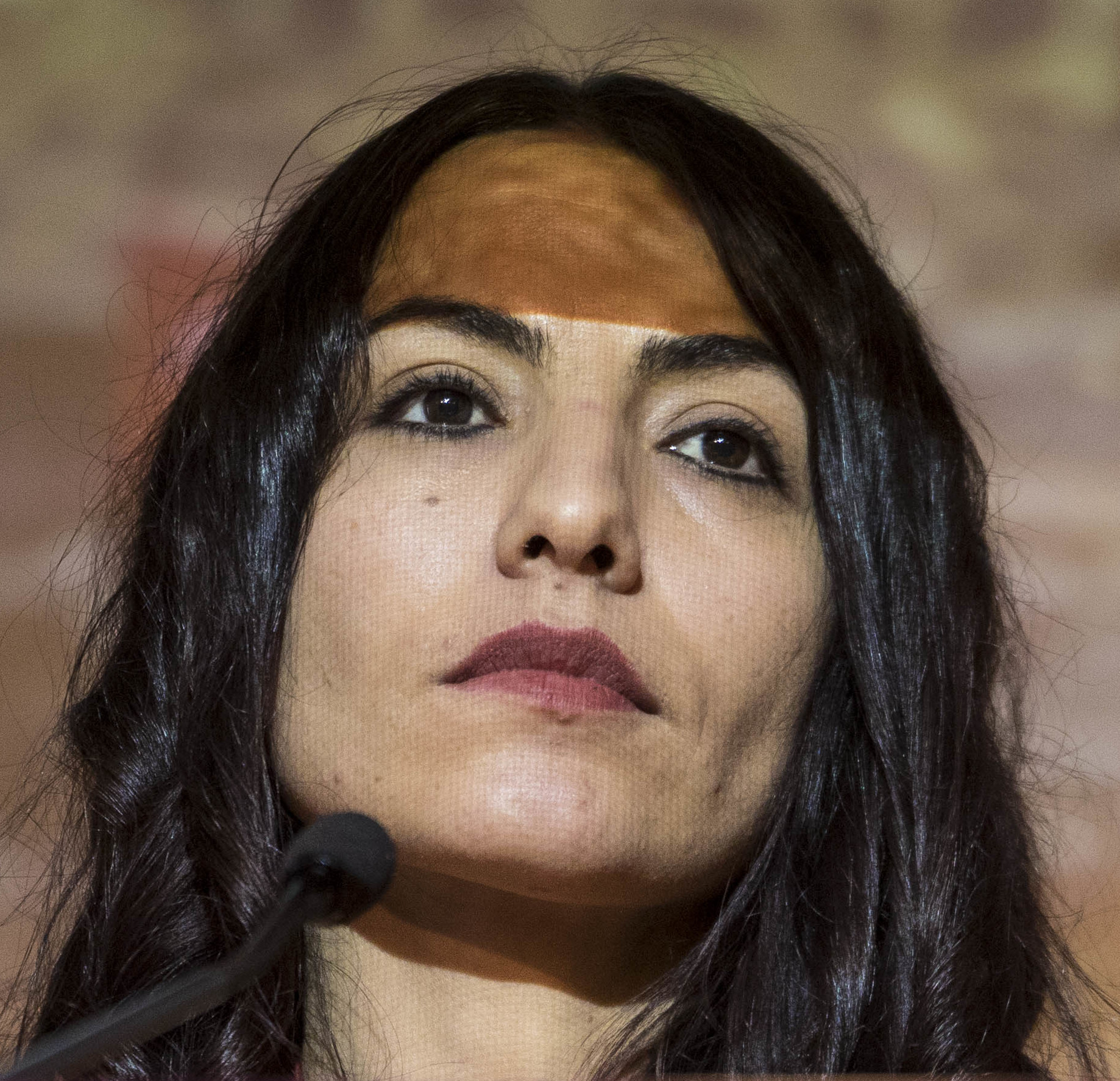
- Hezer Öztürk in 2016

MP

Assembly Member for Van
- In office June 2015 – November 2015
- In office November 2015 – 27 July 2017

Personal details
- Born: Tuğba Hezer Öztürk; 4 October 1989 (age 36) Erciş, Turkey
- Citizenship: Turkey
- Party: Peoples' Democratic Party

Tuğba Hezer Öztürk (born 4 October 1989, Erciş, Turkey) is a Turkish politician from Kurdish descent of the Peoples' Democratic Party (HDP) and a former Member of the Grand National Assembly for of Van.

== Education ==
She studied at the health department of the Ankara University and law at the Anadolu University in Eskişehir. Following she worked as a teacher.

== Political career ==
She was elected to the Turkish Parliament as a deputy for the province of Van in June 2015 and re-elected in November 2015 as the youngest member of the Grand National Assembly of Turkey. In November 2016 an arrest warrant was issued for Hezer Öztürk, but she was not detained due to have travelled abroad. She is sought for terror propaganda and having attended funerals of people who fought against the Turkish government. The prosecutor aims for an aggravated life sentence. On the 27 July 2017 the members of the Parliament voted for the dismissal of Hezer Öztürk and Faysal Sarıyıldız from parliament. Both appealed their dismissal but the constitutional court decided to confirm the dismissal from parliament on the 7 September 2017 after having missed over a year at parliamentarian sessions.

=== Prosecution and exile ===
After her dismissal from parliament, she left Turkey into exile in Europe. In February 2017 she received the support of the German party Die Linke in her defense. On 5 June 2017, the Turkish interior ministry announced that 130 people who are outside the country while being suspected of militant links will lose their citizenship unless they return to Turkey within three months and meet government standards. Amongst the 130 people figured also Tuğba Hezer Öztürk. From her party, she has been given the task to raise awareness from European institutions and politicians towards the human rights violations in south east Anatolia. On the 17 March 2021, the State Prosecutor at the Court of Cassation of Turkey Bekir Şahin filed a lawsuit at the Constitutional Court demanding for her and 686 other HDP politicians a five-year ban to engage in Turkish politics together with a closure of the HDP due to their alleged organizational links with the Kurdistan Workers' Party (PKK).

== Political positions ==
She condemns the policies of the Turkish Government of the Justice and Development Party (AKP) concerning women and Kurdish politicians. She is also critical to the decision of the Turkish parliament to dismiss her from parliament on grounds that she did not attend the parliament for a year as (according to her) the former prime minister Ahmet Davutoğlu was only about twice in parliament since he lost his post as prime minister in May 2016.
