= Bingöl (electoral district) =

Electoral district for the Grand National Assembly of Turkey

Coordinates: 37°50′N 34°45′E

- electoral district for the Grand National Assembly of Turkey
- Bingöl shown within Turkey
- Province: Bingöl
- Electorate: 158,171

Current electoral district
- Created: 1923
- Seats: 3
- Turnout at last election: 82.37%
- Representation
- AK Party: 2 / 3
- DEM: 1 / 3

Bingöl is an electoral district of the Grand National Assembly of Turkey. It elects three members of parliament (deputies) to represent the province of the same name for a four-year term by the D'Hondt method, a party-list proportional representation system.

== Members ==
Population reviews of each electoral district are conducted before each general election, which can lead to certain districts being granted a smaller or greater number of parliamentary seats. Bingöl has consistently elected three MPs since 1999.

MPs for Bingöl, 2002 onwards
Election	2002 (22nd Parliament)	2007 (23rd Parliament)	2011 (24th Parliament)	June 2015 (25th Parliament)	November 2015 (26th Parliament)
MP	Abdurrahman Anik; AK Party	Kazım Ataoğlu; AK Party	Eşref Taş; AK Party	Şebnem Kocakelçi; AK Party	Cevdet Yılmaz; AK Party
MP	Mahfuz Güler; AK Party	Cevdet Yılmaz; AK Party		Enver Fehmioğlu; AK Party	
MP	Feyzi Berdibek; AK Party	Yusuf Coşkun; AK Party	İdris Baluken; Independent / HDP	Hişyar Özsoy; HDP	

== General elections ==
=== 2011 ===
2011 general election: Bingöl
Party	Candidate	Votes	%	±%
AK Party	2 elected ▼1: 1. Cevdet Yılmaz ✓; 2. Eşref Taş ✓; 3. Şahin Bingöl ✗	84,888	67.07	▼4.04
Independent	1 elected ▲1: İdris Baluken ✓	30,245	23.90	▲9.62
CHP	None elected: 1. Zeki Korkutata ✗; 2. Süleyman Batga ✗; 3. Mesut Kayaoğlu ✗	3,890	3.07	▼1.07
MHP	None elected: 1. Ali Haydar Yener ✗; 2. İbrahim Kadri Zengin ✗; 3. Ömer Kemal Timur ✗	1,677	1.33	▼1.21
HAS Party	None elected: 1. Ali Rıza Bozkurt ✗; 2. Ayhan Hatısaru ✗; 3. Asif Çetin ✗	1,603	1.27	▲1.27
Büyük Birlik	None elected: 1. Cemal Eğin ✗; 2. Tahsin Bayram ✗; 3. Cezayir Genç ✗	1,465	1.16	▲1.16
SAADET	None elected: 1. Mahmut Akçabay ✗; 2. Süleyman Aytunç ✗; 3. Nurettin Çiftçi ✗	989	0.78	▼1.14
DSP	None elected: 1. Faruk Aydın ✗; 2. Hikmet Arslanboğa ✗; 3. Seher Çoban ✗	822	0.65	N/A
DP	None elected: 1. Abdullah Oğuzhan ✗; 2. Cemil Demirel ✗; 3. İbrahim Sinan Kökçü ✗	480	0.38	▼3.87
Communist_Party_of_Turkey_(today)	None elected: 1. Meral Doğan ✗; 2. Hanefi Karadağ ✗; 3. Emine Kahraman ✗	300	0.24	▼0.11
DYP	None elected: 1. Serkan Ünal ✗; 2. Harun Çınarlıdere ✗; 3. Bedirhan Berberoğlu ✗	87	0.07	▲0.07
Nationalist Conservative	None elected: 1. Özgüler Yılmaz ✗; 2. Seyfullah Yılmaz ✗; 3. Abdulkadir Diyarbakır ✗	62	0.05	▲0.05
MP	None elected: 1. Yusuf Cesur ✗; 2. Fatih Budak ✗; 3. Sliha Erdoğan ✗	52	0.04	▲0.04
Liberal Democrat	No candidates	0	0.00	▼0.08
Labour	No candidates	0	0.00	0.00
HEPAR	No candidates	0	0.00	0.00
Total votes		126,560	100.00	
Rejected ballots		4,068	3.12	▲1.20
Turnout		130,288	82.37	▼1.65

=== June 2015 ===
Abbr.	Party	Votes	%
AKP	Justice and Development Party	61,293	46.9%
HDP	Peoples' Democratic Party	53,545	41%
Hüda-Par	Free Cause Party	5,424	4.2%
MHP	Nationalist Movement Party	3,692	2.8%
CHP	Republican People's Party	1,629	1.2%
SP	Felicity Party	1,434	1.1%
	Other	3,641	2.8%
Total		130,658	
Turnout		80.05	
source: YSK

=== November 2015 ===
Abbr.	Party	Votes	%
AKP	Justice and Development Party	83,492	64.6%
HDP	Peoples' Democratic Party	38,065	29.5%
MHP	Nationalist Movement Party	2,273	1.8%
CHP	Republican People's Party	1,868	1.4%
SP	Felicity Party	862	0.7%
	Other	2,684	2.1%
Total		129,244	
Turnout		78.56	
source: YSK

=== 2018 ===
Abbr.	Party	Votes	%
AKP	Justice and Development Party	77,051	54.9%
HDP	Peoples' Democratic Party	38,050	27.1%
MHP	Nationalist Movement Party	8,075	5.8%
Hüda-Par	Free Cause Party	6,296	4.5%
IYI	Good Party	5,661	4%
CHP	Republican People's Party	2,503	1.8%
SP	Felicity Party	1,517	1.1%
	Other	1,262	0.9%
Total		140,415	
Turnout		81.33	
source: YSK

== Presidential elections ==
=== 2014 ===
2014 presidential election: Bingöl
Party	Candidate	Votes	%
AK Party	Recep Tayyip Erdoğan	79,538	65.03
HDP	Selahattin Demirtaş	37,380	30.56
Independent	Ekmeleddin İhsanoğlu	5,388	4.41
Total votes		122,306	100.00
Rejected ballots		2.41	2.41
Turnout		125,327	74.59
Recep Tayyip Erdoğan win			
