= Gülser Yıldırım =

Turkish statesperson (born 1963)

Member of the Grand National Assembly of Turkey

Assembly Member for Mardin
- In office 2014 – June 2015
- In office June 2015 – November 2015
- In office November 2015 – November 2016

Personal details
- Born: January 1, 1963 (age 63) Nusaybin, Mardin
- Party: HDP
- Other political affiliations: BDP
- Children: 4

Gülser Yıldırım (born 1 January 1963, Nusaybin, Mardin) is a Kurdish politician of the Peoples' Democratic Party (HDP) and former member of the Grand National Assembly of Turkey. In 2011, she was elected into the Turkish parliament out of prison, but had to wait until 2014 until she was allowed to assume by a Turkish court.

== Early life and education ==
She was born in Nusaybin, where she attended primary and secondary school. She was arrested due to an investigation into the activities of the Kurdistan Communities Union (KCK) in 2010. Despite being imprisoned, she became an independent candidate for Mardin in the parliamentary elections of 2011.

== Political career ==
She was elected as an independent member of the Grand National Assembly of Turkey in the General elections of 2011 representing Mardin. Due to her imprisonment, along with three other elected politicians from the Peace and Democracy Party (BDP), she was not allowed to assume her post. She was released together with fellow BDP politician Ibrahim Ayhan in January 2014, on grounds that as elected Members of Parliament, their rights have been violated with their imprisonment. Their release was noted with satisfaction by the Inter Parliamentarian Union. She was elected to the Turkish parliament in the general elections of June 2015, and re-elected during the snap elections in November 2015, both times representing Mardin for the HDP. She was detained on the 4 November 2016 together with eleven other parliamentarians of the HDP. In April 2018, she was sentenced to seven years and six months in prison for attending manifestations in opposition to the curfews in the Kurdish majority towns in 2016 and funeral services of fighters of the Kurdistan Workers Party (PKK). Yildirim has been included into a program of the German Bundestag supporting twelve politicians of the HDP. Through the program, Nils Schmid of the Social Democratic Party of Germany (SPD) advocated for her release. In October 2020, following her attendance in a hearing relating to investigations into the Kobane protests, she was released into house arrest pending trial. On the 17 March 2021, the State Prosecutor before the Court of Cassation of Turkey Bekir Şahin filed a lawsuit before the Constitutional Court demanding for her and 686 other HDP politicians a five-year ban to engage in politics. The lawsuit was filed jointly with a request for a closure of the HDP due to the parties alleged organizational links with the PKK.

== Personal life ==
She is married and has four children.
