= Murat Bozlak =

Turkish politician of Kurdish descent

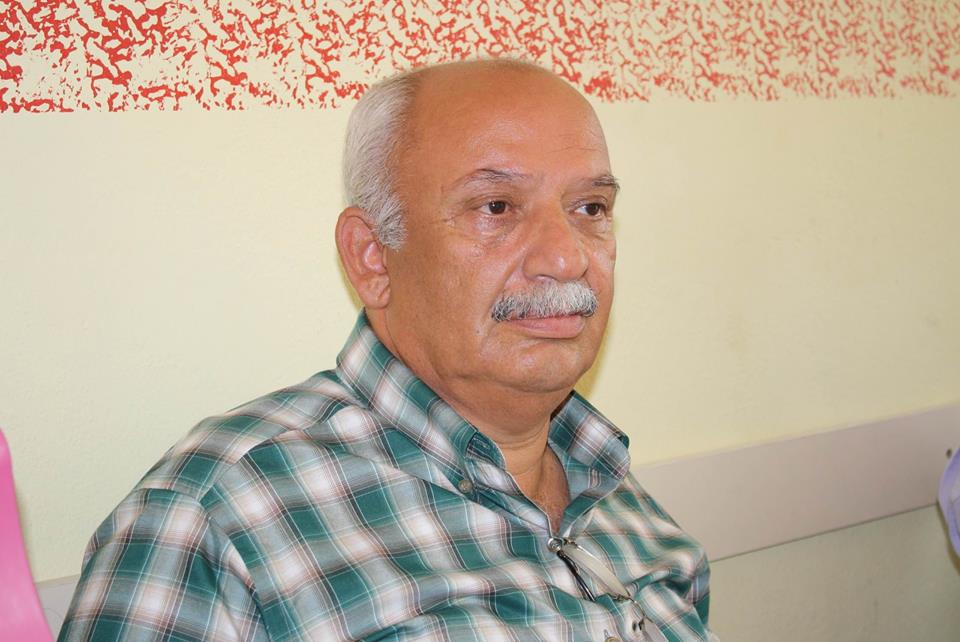

Leader of the People's Democracy Party
- In office 1994–1999
- Succeeded by: Turan Demir
- In office 2000–2002

Member of the Grand National Assembly
- In office 12 June 2011 – 4 January 2015
- Constituency: Adana (2011)

Personal details
- Born: 30 December 1952 Şereflikoçhisar, Ankara
- Died: 4 January 2015 (aged 62) Ankara
- Party: HADEP
- Other political affiliations: HDP, DEP
- Education: Ankara University
- Occupation: Lawyer, politician

Murat Bozlak (30 December 1952 – 4 January 2015) was a Kurdish politician active in several political parties. He was the president of the People's Democracy Party (HADEP) and a member of the Grand National Assembly of Turkey for the Peoples’ Democratic Party (HDP). Bozlak was a Kurdish politician and a founding member of the Social Democracy Party (SODEP), the Social Democratic Populist Party (SHP), the People's Labor Party (HEP), the Democracy Party (DEP) and the HADEP. The first two parties were dissolved, while the latter three were banned by the Turkish constitutional court.

== Education and early life ==
Bozlak graduated from Ankara University Law Faculty and following worked as an independent lawyer.

== Political career ==
In February 1994, when he was secretary-general of the DEP, Bozlak survived an assassination attempt in Ankara. Following the detention of DEP deputies in March 1994 and a move to close the DEP, he founded the HADEP in May 1994. In November 1998, after Italy refused to extradite Abdullah Öcalan to Turkey, he was detained together with dozens of other HADEP members and accused for having supported a country wide hunger strike in opposition to the Turkish approach towards the Kurdish Turkish conflict In the same month he was arrested and sentenced to a prison term of one year for speeches he held in 1993. Several Members of the Parliament of the United Kingdom around Jeremy Corbyn condemned the arrest, noting that Bozlak has only pursued a negotiated solution to the Kurdish-Turkish conflict. Bozlak was able to leave the prison in April 1997. He shortly delivered the presidency of the HADEP to Turan Demir in September 1999. He reassumed the presidency during the 4th party congress in November 2000, after Demir was sentenced to 10 months in prison for terrorist propaganda. For the general elections of November 2002, in worries of a party ban of the HADEP, he resigned from its presidency and joined the Democratic People's Party (DEHAP). But his candidacy for the Diyarbakır province was invalidated by the Turkish electoral authorities. In his stead, his wife Zeycan Bozlak became the DEHAP candidate for Diyarbakır. The HADEP was closed down by the Turkish constitutional court in October 2003 and Bozlak was banned from politics for five years.

In the June 2011 elections, Bozlak was elected to the Turkish parliament as an independent candidate representing Adana for the Labor, Democracy and Freedom Bloc supported by the Peace and Democracy Party (BDP). In 2014, Bozlak and 26 other MPs of the BDP joined the HDP, which following formed a parliamentary group.

=== Political positions ===
He maintained that Kurdistan was separated into four parts after World War I and included into a "national-colonial system" and reserved for the Kurds the right for "self-determination". He then also wanted that the Kurds in Turkey, were able to be recognized as such and allowed to organize themselves democratically. He further denied that the Kurds had a problem with the Turkish people, but more with the Turkish Government.

=== Personal life ===
He served as an Adana deputy until January 2015, when he died. He refused a ceremony traditionally held for deceased deputies in front of the Turkish Parliament. Instead, a ceremony was held on 6 January in front of the headquarters of the DBP in Ankara before he was buried in his home village. He was married and a father to three children.

== See also ==
- List of members of the Grand National Assembly of Turkey who died in office
