= İdris Baluken =

Kurdish politician

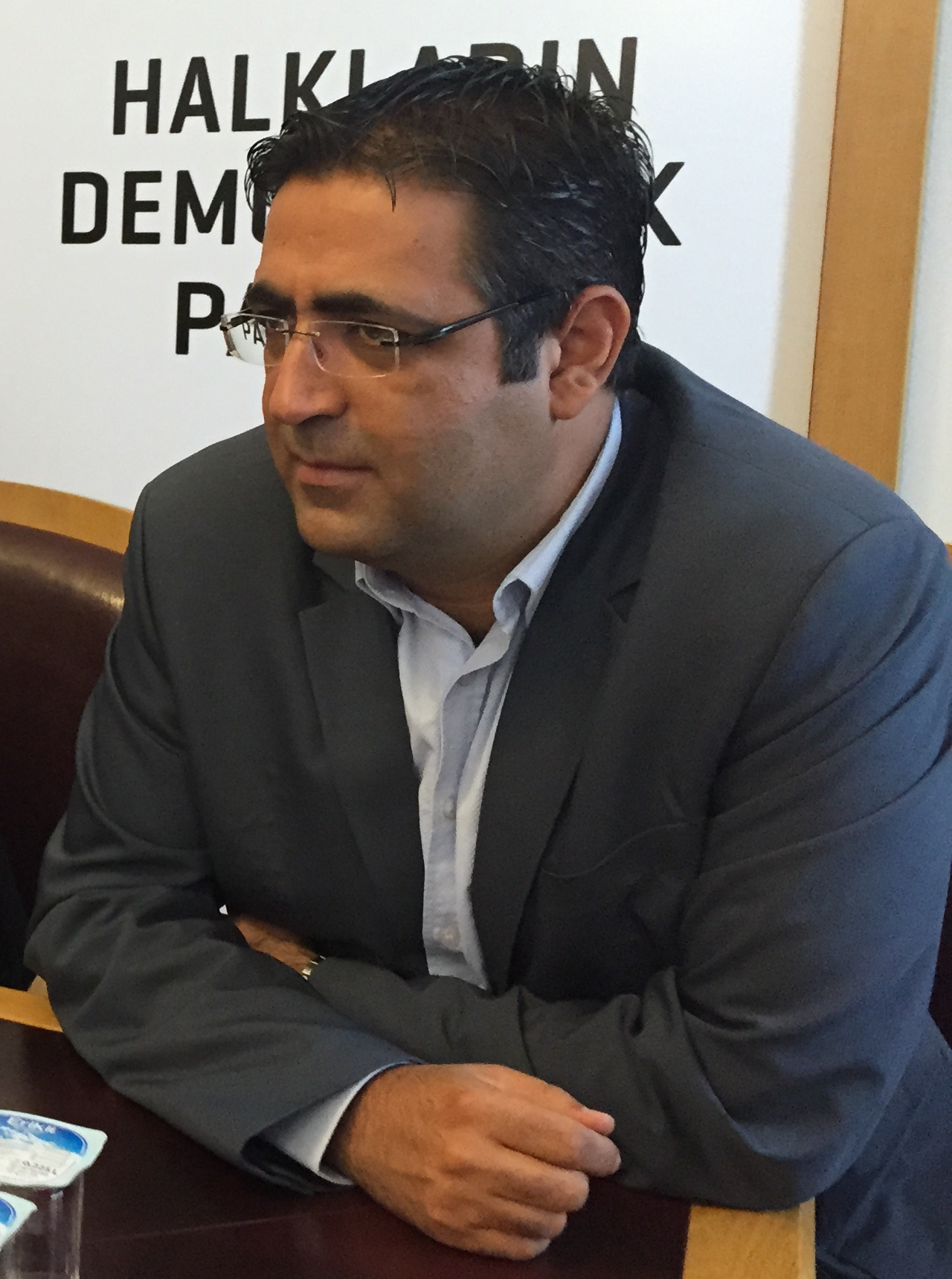
- İdris Baluken

Parliamentary group leader of the Peoples' Democratic Party
- In office 28 April 2014 – 4 November 2016
- Leader: Selahattin Demirtaş; Figen Yüksekdağ
- Serving with: Pervin Buldan (2014-15); Çağlar Demirel (2015- )
- Preceded by: Position established

Parliamentary group leader of the Peace and Democracy Party
- In office 22 July 2012 – 28 April 2014
- Leader: Selahattin Demirtaş
- Serving with: Pervin Buldan
- Preceded by: Hasip Kaplan
- Succeeded by: Position abolished

Member of the Grand National Assembly
- In office 12 June 2011 – 7 July 2018
- Constituency: Bingöl (2011); Diyarbakır (June 2015, Nov 2015)

Personal details
- Born: 2 July 1976 (age 49) Bingöl, Turkey
- Party: Peoples' Democratic Party (2014- ) Peace and Democracy Party (2011-14)
- Spouse: Evrim Baluken
- Education: Medicine
- Alma mater: Ankara University

İdris Baluken (born 2 July 1976) is a Kurdish politician who currently serves as a parliamentary group leader of the Peoples' Democratic Party (HDP) since April 2014. He previously served as a parliamentary group leader for the Peace and Democracy Party (BDP) from 2012 until the party's MPs joined the HDP in April 2014.

He has been a Member of Parliament for the electoral district of Diyarbakır since the June 2015 general election, having previously served as an MP for Bingöl from 2011 to 2015. Initially elected as an Independent in 2011 as a means of bypassing the 10% election threshold, Baluken and the other pro-Kurdish Independents that were elected in the election formed the BDP parliamentary group shortly after.

== Early life and career ==
İdris Baluken was born on 2 July 1976 in Bingöl and graduated from Ankara University Faculty of Medicine. He specialised in pulmonary diseases and Tuberculosis in the Pulmonary Research and Education hospital in Heybeliada, Istanbul. He worked in a dispensary, a state hospital in Bingöl and at the Diyarbakır pulmonary diseases hospital as a surgeon. He has been involved in the administration of the Turkish Thoracic Society, the Turkish Medical Association and the Health and Social Service Workers Union Diyarbakır branch. He is married and has two children.

== Political career ==
=== Peace and Democracy Party ===
Baluken was fielded as an Independent candidate in the electoral district of Bingöl by the Labour, Democracy and Freedom Bloc for the 2011 general election. As a member of the Peace and Democracy Party (BDP), Baluken and several other pro-Kurdish or left-wing politicians fielded as independent candidates within the Labour, Democracy and Freedom Bloc in a joint effort to bypass the 10% election threshold that would be required had the BDP contested the election as a party. He was appointed as a parliamentary group leader of the BDP by leader Selahattin Demirtaş on 22 July 2012 after Hasip Kaplan was removed from the post.

== Peoples' Democratic Party ==
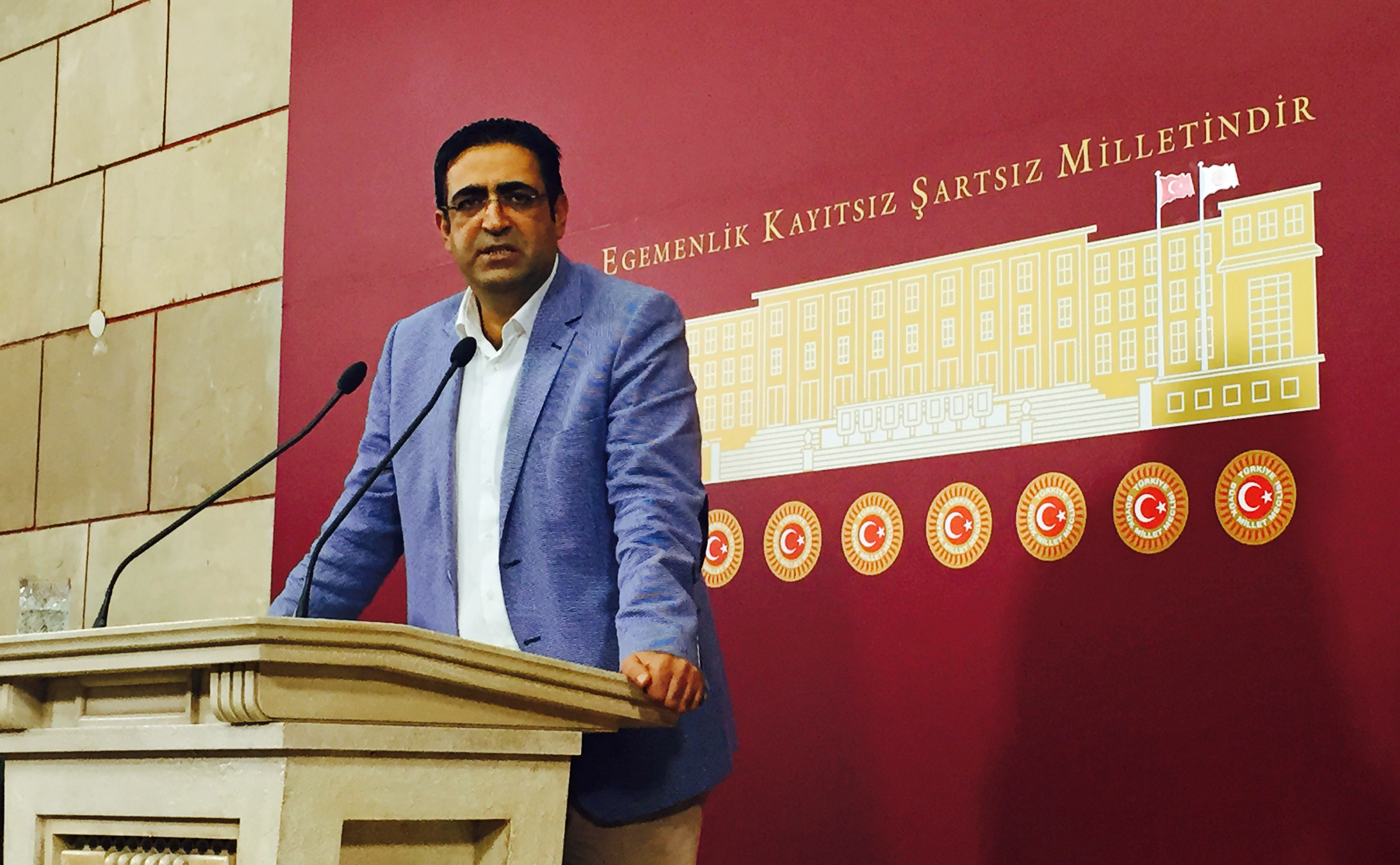
Baluken giving a statement in Parliament, 2015

On 28 April 2014, after an agreement between the BDP and the newly formed Peoples' Democratic Party (HDP), all but three BDP Members of Parliament left the party to form a HDP parliamentary group instead, with Baluken thereby continuing in office as parliamentary group leader for his new party. He was a member of the Imrali delegation of HDP politicians facilitating peace negotiations between the PKK and the Turkish Government which until 28 February 2015 led to the Dolmabahce Statement.

He was re-elected as an MP, this time from the electoral district of Diyarbakır in the June 2015 general election and was re-elected in the November 2015 general election five months later. In January 2016 it was revealed that his wife had been employed by the Anadolu Agency (the Turkish state news company) during the peace negotiations between the Turkish government and the Kurdistan Workers' Party (HDP), in which the HDP acted as a mediator. In June 2016 he voiced disappointment to the lack of a solution in the controversy around the accusations of a forged university certificate from the Turkish president Recep Tayyip Erdogan.

=== Legal prosecution ===
He was taken into custody in Ankara on 4 November 2016, in an operation where HDP-co leaders Selahattin Demirtaş and Figen Yüksekdağ were also detained. Later in the same day, he was arrested on charges of "praising criminals, spreading the propaganda of a terrorist organization, committing crimes on behalf of a terrorist organization whilst not being a member, publicly denigrating the Turkish nation, the Republic of Turkey and its institutions". He was released on the 30 January 2017, but re-arrested 21 February. On 4 January 2018 Baluken was sentenced to 16 years and 8 months in prison. In prison he began to write and the books Üc Kirik Da and Oko were published at Dipnot publishing house. On the 17 March 2021, the State Prosecutor to the Court of Cassation Bekir Şahin filed a lawsuit at the Constitutional Court for him and 686 other HDP politicians a five-year ban to engage in politics together with a closure of the HDP due to their alleged organizational links with the Kurdistan Workers' Party (PKK).
