= Nursel Aydoğan =

Turkish politician

Member of the Grand National Assembly
- In office 12 June 2011 – 9 May 2017
- Constituency: Diyarbakır (2011, June 2015, Nov 2015)

Personal details
- Born: November 17, 1958 (age 67) Bursa, Turkey
- Party: Peoples' Democratic Party (HDP)
- Other political affiliations: Peace and Democracy Party (BDP) (2011-14)
- Education: Hacettepe University
- Occupation: Politician

Nursel Aydoğan (born 17 November 1958 in Yenişehir, Bursa, Turkey), is a Turkish politician and former MP for Diyarbakır.

== Early life and education ==
In 1983 she graduated from Hacettepe University department of food engineering. Since then she has worked as a food engineer.

She became active in human rights groups and politics and in 2003 was spokeswoman for the Federation of Associations of Families of Detainees and Convicts for Cooperation (TUAD-FED) Three years later she is quoted as the Chairman of TUAD-FED.

== Political career ==
Nursel Aydoğan was a founding member of the Peace and Democracy Party. In the June 2011 General election, running as an independent candidate, she was elected to the Grand National Assembly of Turkey as an MP for Diyarbakır. In October 2011, she was charged with making propaganda for a terrorist organization. The chief prosecutor asked for a 72-year prison sentence. In the June 2015 Elections and the November 2015 election she was re-elected as a member of parliament for the HDP in the province Diyarbakır. Her immunity was lifted on 20 May 2016 and she was detained on 4 November 2016. According to her party she was accused of "attending a funeral, joining a protest, standing behind a banner that read “Enough, No More Deaths, May Freedom Grow” during a protest, and giving speeches during press conferences." For these offenses she was sentenced to 4 years 8 months and 7 days in prison on 13 January 2017. On the 21 April 2017 she was released on probation but on the 28 April a new arrest warrant was issued for her. In May 2017 Aydoğan was stripped of her mandate in the Turkish Parliament, following which she left Turkey and went into exile to Europe. On the 17 March 2021, the State Prosecutor at the Court of Cassation in Turkey Bekir Şahin filed a lawsuit before the Constitutional Court, demanding for Aydoğan and 686 other HDP politicians a five-year ban for taking part in Turkish politics. At the same time, Şahin asked for the shutting down of the HDP for it being no different than the Kurdistan Workers' Party (PKK).
