= Selma Irmak =

Kurdish politician

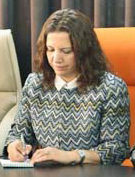

Member of Parliament
- In office 2014–2015
- Constituency: Şırnak
- In office November 2015 – April 2018 (Dismissed)
- Constituency: Hakkari

Co-Chair of the Democratic Society Congress
- In office 2014–2016 Serving with Hatip Dicle

Personal details
- Born: 8 March 1971 (age 55) Kızıltepe, Mardin, Turkey

Selma Irmak (born 8 March 1971, Kızıltepe, Turkey), is a Kurdish politician from Turkey and former MP for the Peace and Democracy Party (BDP) and People's Democratic Party (HDP).

== Personal life ==
The Turkish Parliament's biographical record for Irmak is concise, indicating that she has completed high school and is currently single. It was while she was studying to be a teacher at the Selçuk University in Konya, when she was arrested for the first time.

== Political career and legal prosecution ==
In the 1990s, she spent almost ten years in prison on charges of membership of the Kurdistan Workers' Party (PKK).

She was for several years a co-chair of the Democratic Society Party (DTP). In October 2008, she was sentenced to six months' imprisonment for praising crimes and criminals. The court sentence was later commuted to a fine of 5,000 Turkish lira.

She stood for mayor for Derik in the 29 March 2009 local elections. On 18 April 2009, while still co-chair of the DTP, she was again arrested in a police operation in Mardin, and detained in Diyarbakır E Type Prison on charges of membership of a terrorist organization. DTP members were targeted with large-scale arrests in April 2009.

She was being tried alongside 175 other Kurdish politicians and political activists in the so-called mass 'KCK trial', which began in October 2010. In 2011 she was elected as a member of Parliament representing the Sırnak province, but due to her arrest she could not be sworn in. The court ruled that the parliamentary immunity, which usually all Turkish Member of Parliaments have, does not apply in her case. Politicians from the Labour, Democracy and Freedom Block and other organizations protested against this ruling.

In February 2012, she went on hunger strike along with many other fellow detainees and released a statement in support for Abdullah Öcalan.

She was freed on 4 January 2014, by decision of the Diyarbakir High Criminal Court. Her release came shortly after a landmark decision of the Turkish Constitutional Court in the case of Mustafa Balbay After her release she took her oath in the Turkish parliament on 7 January 2014 and became co-chair of the Democratic Society Congress (DTK), which she stayed until 2016. In the Parliamentary Elections in June and the Parliamentary Elections in November 2015 she was elected as an MP representing Hakkari for the party HDP.

On the 4 November 2016 she was arrested upon terrorist charges. While the prosecution demanded more than 52 years imprisonment the court sentenced her in November 2017 to 10 years in prison for leading the PKK and being a member of a terrorist organization and disseminating terrorist propaganda. In March 2018 the sentence was upheld by a court in Gaziantep, and in the same year in April she was dismissed from Parliament. On the 15 January 2019 she declared she will join Leyla Güven in her hunger strike demanding better detention conditions for Abdullah Öcalan. The State Prosecutor at the Court of Cassation in Turkey Bekir Şahin filed a lawsuit before the Constitutional Court on the 17 March 2021, asking for Irmak and 686 other HDP politicians a five-year ban to engage in political activities. Şahin filed the lawsuit jointly with a request for the HDP to be shut down arguing that there is no difference between the PKK and the HDP.
