= Metin Külünk =

Turkish politician (born 1960)

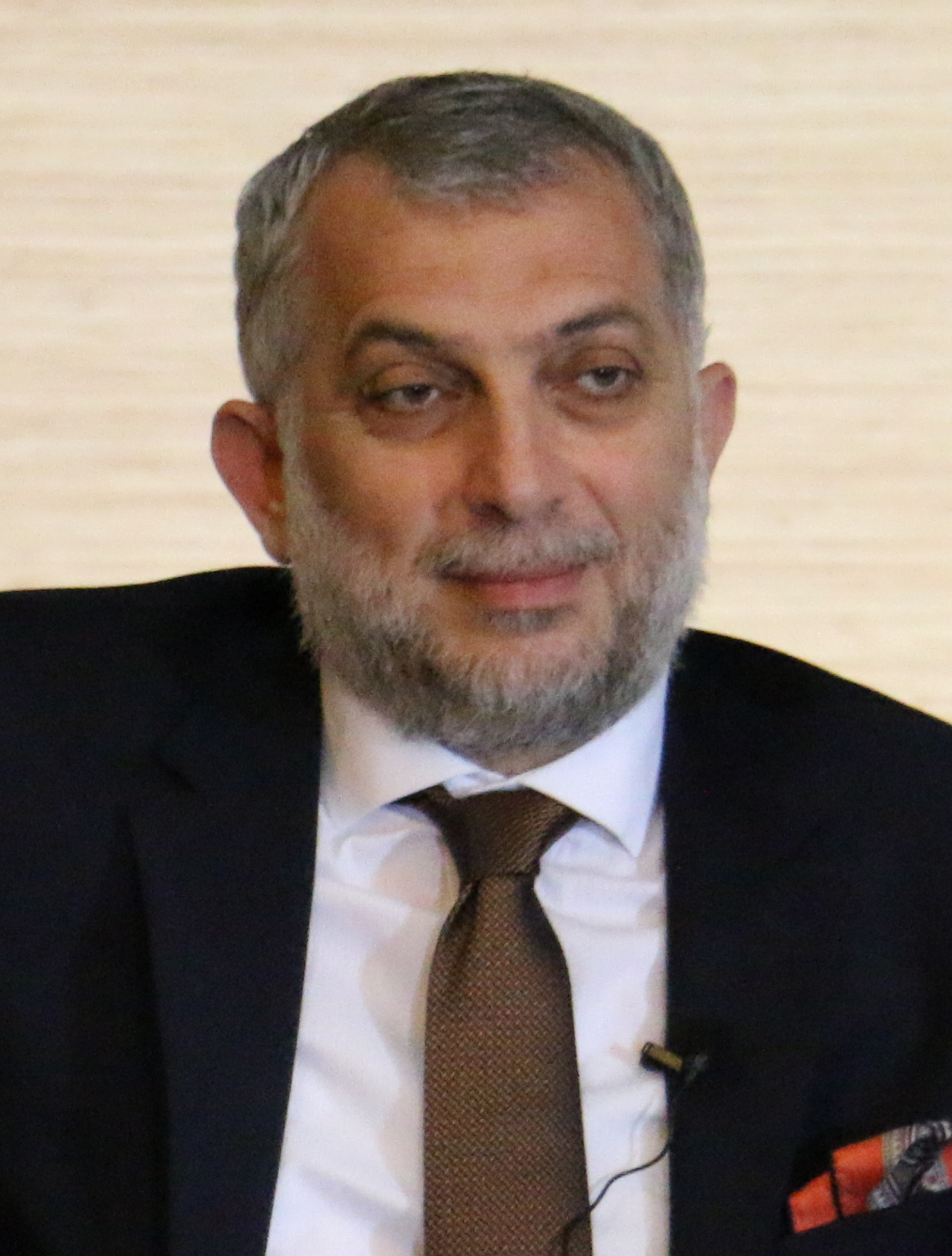

Member of the Grand National Assembly of Turkey
- In office 2011–2018
- Constituency: Istanbul

Personal details
- Born: Metin Külünk; 16 December 1960 (age 65) Güneysu, Rize
- Party: Justice and Development Party
- Education: Yildiz Technical University

Metin Külünk (born, 16 December 1960, Yenimahalle, Turkey) is a Turkish engineer and politician of the Justice and Development Party (AKP) and a member of the Grand National Assembly of Turkey. He is a close political ally of Recep Tayyip Erdoğan and considered his "Commissioner for Germany".

== Early life and professional career ==
He was born in the Yenimahalle district of Ankara province and studied Civil Engineering at the Yıldız Technical University. He started his own company in 1984 and was an organized in several business associations between 1995 and 2005. Between 1993 and 1995 he taught foreign trade at the University of Marmara.

== Political career ==
He was elected to the Grand National Assembly of Turkey in the parliamentary election in June 2011 representing Istanbul for the AKP and re-elected parliamentary elections in June 2015 and in the snap elections in November 2015. He is a political ally of Recep Tayyip Erdoğan and in March 2021, he was appointed to the executive board of the AKP.

== Controversies ==
He was observed to have handed over envelopes to the former leader of the Turkish Boxing Club Osmanen Germania an organization which protested the Armenian Genocide resolution in Germany in 2016. Over wiretaps he was heard to encourage to hit Kurds in Germany and videotape the event, which then could be used as a deterrent for the critics of the Turkish Government. Crime boss Sedat Peker claimed that Külünk would receive 10.000$ a month from him. Külünk is considered "Commissioner for Germany".

== Personal life ==
Metin Külünk is married and is the father of a child.
