= Abdullah Levent Tüzel =

Turkish politician (born 1961)

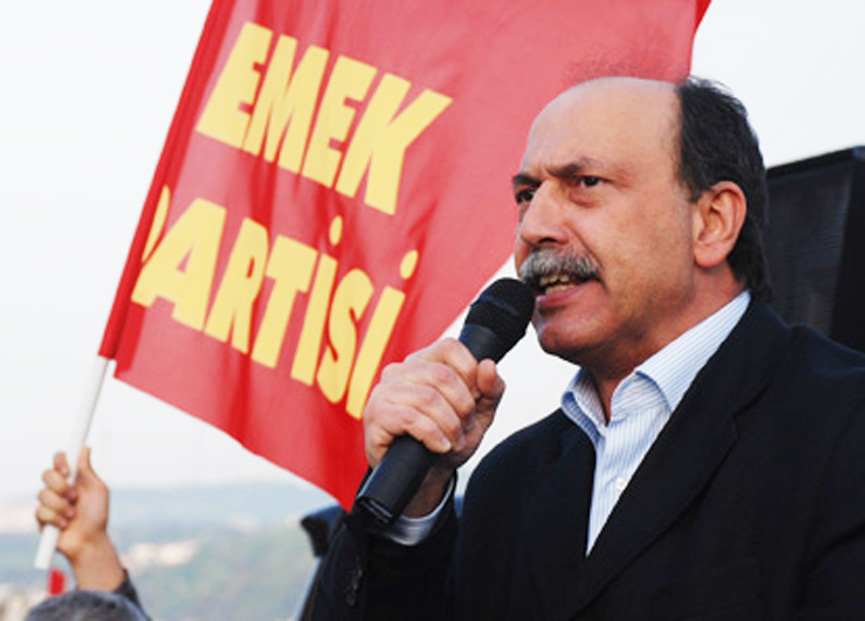

Member of the Grand National Assembly
- In office 28 June 2011 – 1 October 2015
- Constituency: Istanbul (III) (2011, June 2015)

Leader of the Labour Party
- In office 25 November 1996 – 21 May 2011
- Preceded by: Position established
- Succeeded by: Selma Gürkan

Personal details
- Born: 12 July 1961 (age 65) Bulancak, Turkey
- Party: Labour Party (1996-2011); Independent (2011-2013); Peoples' Democratic Party (2013–present)
- Other political affiliations: Peoples' Democratic Congress (HDK)
- Education: Istanbul University

Abdullah Levent Tüzel (born 12 July 1961) is a Turkish politician who was one of the founders of the Labour Party (EMEP) in 1996. He was a Member of Parliament for Istanbul's third electoral district, had been elected as an Independent in the 2011 general election with the backing of the Labour, Democracy and Freedom Bloc. He was with the parliamentary group of the Peoples' Democratic Party (HDP).

Tüzel graduated from Istanbul University Law school and has been a freelance lawyer since 1985. Founding the Labour Party in 1996, he managed resigned before the 2011 general election in order to contest the election as an independent from Istanbul. Despite recent disagreements between EMEP and the HDP regarding the influence of Kurdish nationalism within the party, Tüzel joined the HDP and was HDP Member of Parliament until the end of his term.

== Early life and career ==
Abdullah Levent Tüzel was born on 12 July 1961 in Bulancak and graduated from Istanbul University Faculty of Law. In 1985, he became a freelance lawyer. He became a member of the Human Rights Foundation Istanbul executive board and also served as the President of the Modern Lawyers Association Istanbul Branch.

== Political career ==
=== Labour Party ===
In 1996, Tüzel became one of the founding members of the Labour Party (EMEP) and served as the party's leader until 1 June 2007, after which he resigned to contest the 2007 general election as an independent candidate. He was supported by the Thousand Hope Candidates bloc, formed of several small left-wing organisations that aimed to bypass the 10% election threshold by fielding candidates as independents. Running for election in İzmir's first electoral district, he failed to secure enough votes to win a seat in Parliament. He subsequently resumed his role as the leader of the Labour Party.

=== Election to Parliament ===
In the 2011 general election, Tüzel once again resigned from the Labour Party to contest the election as an independent, this time supported by the Labour, Democracy and Freedom Bloc. Contesting the election in Istanbul's third electoral district, he won a seat and became one of the 35 Bloc MPs elected to Parliament.

=== Peoples' Democratic Party ===
In 2013, Tüzel joined the newly formed Peoples' Democratic Party (HDP), which had been formed by a coalition of left-wing political groups that had participated in the Peoples' Democratic Congress (HDK). The Labour Party was initially part of the HDP, though later withdrew over disagreements over the inclusion of Kurdish nationalist parties in the HDP. However, as a proponent of freeing Abdullah Öcalan, the imprisoned leader of the Kurdish separatist Kurdistan Workers' Party (PKK), Tüzel remained as a HDP MP and the Labour Party decided to support the HDP during the June 2015 general election, in which Tüzel was re-elected as an MP from third electoral district.
