= İbrahim Ayhan =

Turkish politician (1968–2018)

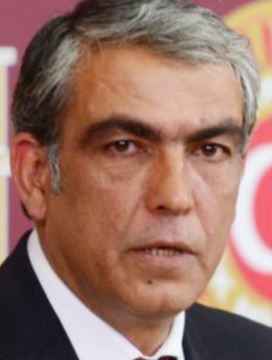

Member of the Grand National Assembly
- In office January 2014 – February 2018
- Constituency: Şanlıurfa (2011, June 2015, Nov 2015)

Personal details
- Born: 10 February 1968 Siverek, Turkey
- Died: 20 September 2018 (aged 50) Erbil, Iraqi Kurdistan, Iraq
- Party: Peace and Democracy Party (2008–2014); Peoples' Democratic Party (2014–2018)
- Other political affiliations: Group of Communities in Kurdistan (KCK)
- Education: Yüzüncü Yıl University

İbrahim Ayhan (10 February 1968 – 20 September 2018) was a Turkish politician of Kurdish origin and a former Member of Parliament for Şanlıurfa.

== Personal life and professional career ==
Born in Siverek, Şanlıurfa, he graduated from the Yüzüncü Yıl University in Van in 1992. After he worked as a teacher. From 1997 to 2007, he was an executive and chairperson of the Education and Science Workers' Union in Urfa. He was married with two children.

== Political career and legal prosecution ==
On 5 October 2010, he was arrested as part of an investigation into the Kurdish confederalist Group of Communities in Kurdistan (KCK) organisation. After he became an independent candidate and was elected Member of Parliament (MP) for Sanliurfa in the general elections of 2011. A court in Diyarbakır refused to release several elected independent MPs, as was also Ayhan. He appealed to the Constitutional Court, claiming that the legally allowed detention time had been exceeded and his right to stand in elections had been violated. He was released alongside the imprisoned MP Gülser Yıldırım on 3 January 2014, enabling them to take the oath. On 28 August 2014, he joined the Peoples' Democratic Party (HDP) parliamentary caucus along with all other BDP MPs. He was re-elected in the general elections of June and November 2015. In February 2018 he was dismissed as Member of Parliament for having shown solidarity with a killed fighter from the Peoples' Protection Units (YPG). He was sentenced to 1 year and 3 months imprisonment for sharing a photograph a fighter killed in Syrian Kurdistan, which was interpreted as terror propaganda. On the 20 September 2018 Ayhan died due to a heart attack he suffered in Erbil, Iraqi Kurdistan.
