= People's Democracy Party =

Political party in Turkey

People's Democracy Party: Kurdish: Partiya Demokrasiya Gel; Turkish: Halkın Demokrasi Partisi
- Leader: Murat Bozlak
- Chairperson: Murat Bozlak (1994–1999); Ahmet Turan Demir (1999–2000); Murat Bozlak (2000–2003)
- Founded: 11 May 1994
- Banned: 13 March 2003
- Preceded by: Democracy Party
- Succeeded by: Democratic People's Party

People's Democracy Party (Turkish: Halkın Demokrasi Partisi, HADEP) was a Kurdish political party in Turkey. Murat Bozlak founded the party on 11 May 1994. The party disbanded in 2003.

== History ==
=== Bozlak's first chairmanship ===
Party founder and attorney Murat Bozlak was the party's first chairman, serving between 1994 and 1999. During the campaign for the parliamentary elections of 1995, the political environment was hostile to HADEP and the Welfare Party (RP). HADEP was permitted to compete to limit the influence of the RP.

After the elections, allegations of fraud emerged because a HADEP candidate allegedly did not receive any votes in his home village, which included his wife. At the party congress in June 1996, masked men dropped the Turkish flag and raised the PKK flag. As a result, all HADEP members present at the congress were arrested.

The party came under pressure when Italy refused to extradite Abdullah Öcalan to Turkey. Dozens of party members were detained and accused of having supported a country-wide hunger strike to protest the Turkish role in the Kurdish Turkish conflict.

=== Demir's chairmanship ===
Bozlak was succeeded by Ahmet Turan Demir, who served as party chairman from September 1998 to November 1999. In January 1999, 41 of the detained HADEP members were released, but four remained in custody. The same month, a state prosecutor demanded the party's closure before the Constitutional Court, alleging that party had organizational ties with the PKK. In February 1999, Abdullah Öcalan was captured in Kenya and imprisoned on Imrali, hundreds of party members were also detained.

After the Turkish press reported that Öcalan said PKK named the party's candidates, the state prosecutor demanded the party's exclusion from the General Elections of 1999. The party was not excluded nor banned. However, in the electoral campaign for general and local elections of April 1999, the party faced opposition from the Turkish authorities. The government prohibited the party's Diyarbakır rally, planned for the week before the elections, and detained thousands of people.

At the time, the party hoped to become an important factor in Turkish politics. Despite the government's suppression, the party was successful in the local elections of April 1999 and won 37 mayorships, including Diyarbakır. In August 1999, President Süleyman Demirel welcomed seven of the HADEP mayors in Ankara, helping to alleviate the legal situation for the Kurdish politicians. In 1999, HADEP became the first party in the history of Turkish politics to introduced a female quota of 25%.

=== Bozlak's second chairmanship ===
Bozlak had a second term as party chair, serving until the party dissolved in 2003. HADEP politicians and supporters were detained prior to a 1 September 2001 event for World Peace Day. HADEP was repeatedly accused of supporting terror. In 2002, it received support from Socialist International (SI) which demanded that Turkey provide a framework for a fair pluralistic democracy. However, the party was banned by the Constitutional Court on 13 March 2003 because it allegedly supported the PKK. The courts leading judge, Mustafa Bumin, stated that the party was a threat to the indivisibility of the Turkish Republic. As a result, 46 politicians from the HADEP were banned from politics for five years. Greece, the holder of the EU presidency at the time, issued a statement criticizing the events.

== Dissolution ==
The party was succeeded by the Democratic People's Party (DEHAP), which was joined by 35 mayors of the former HADEP on the 26 March 2003. In 2010, the party's forced dissolution was unanimously found to be contrary to Article 11 (Freedom of Association) of the European Convention on Human Rights by the European Court of Human Rights (ECHR).

== Bibliography ==
- Güney, Aylin (2002). "The People's Democracy Party". Turkish Studies. 3 (1): 122–137. doi:10.1080/714005704. hdl:11693/48656. S2CID 143548942.
- Moghadam, Valentine M. (2007). From Patriarchy to Empowerment: Women's Participation, Movements, and Rights in the Middle East, North Africa, and South Asia. Syracuse, NY: Syracuse University Press. ISBN 978-0-8156-3111-8.
- McDowall, David. (2003) A Modern History of the Kurds (London: I.B. Tauris, 2003), p. 463. ISBN 978-1850434160
