= Peoples' Democratic Party (Turkey) =

Pluralist leftist Turkish political party

Peoples' Democratic Party Halkların Demokratik Partisi
- Abbreviation: HDP
- Chairwoman: Sultan Özcan
- Chairman: Cahit Kırkazak
- Spokesperson: Ebru Günay
- Founded: 15 October 2012; 14 years ago
- Dissolved: 15 October 2023; 3 years ago
- Preceded by: Peace and Democracy Party
- Merged into: Peoples' Equality and Democracy Party (de facto)
- Headquarters: Büklüm Sokağı 117; 06680 Çankaya, Ankara
- Membership (2026): ▼3,593
- Ideology: Minority rights; Kurdish interests; Kurdish nationalism; Regionalism; Turkeyification; Democratic socialism; Secularism; Progressivism; Social democracy; Left-wing populism; Feminism
- Political position: Centre-left to left-wing
- National affiliation: Peoples' Democratic Congress; Labour and Freedom Alliance (since 2022)
- European affiliation: Party of European Socialists (associate)
- International affiliation: Progressive Alliance; Socialist International (consultative)
- Colours: Purple; Green
- Slogan: Bu daha başlangıç ("This is Just the Beginning") "Bizler meclise" ("We are in parliament")

Party flag

Website
- hdp.org.tr/en/

The Peoples' Democratic Party (Turkish: Halkların Demokratik Partisi, acronymized as HDP; Kurdish: Partiya Demokratîk a Gelan), or Democratic Party of the Peoples, was a Turkish political party that mainly represented ethnic minorities in Turkey, especially Kurds. Generally left-wing, the party placed a strong emphasis on participatory and radical democracy, feminism, minority rights, youth rights, and egalitarianism. It was an associate member of the Party of European Socialists (PES), a consultative member of the Socialist International, and a party within the Progressive Alliance (PA).

Aspiring to fundamentally challenge the existing Turkish–Kurdish divide and other existing parameters in Turkish politics, the HDP was founded in 2012 as the political wing of the Peoples' Democratic Congress, a union of numerous left-wing movements that had previously fielded candidates as independents to bypass the 10% election threshold. The HDP is in an alliance with the Kurdish Democratic Regions Party (DBP), often described as the HDP's fraternal party. From 2013 to 2015, the politicians of the DBP participated in peace negotiations between the Turkish government and the Kurdistan Workers' Party (PKK).

The party operates a co-presidential system of leadership, with one chairman and one chairwoman. In the 2014 presidential election, the party put forward its chairman, Selahattin Demirtaş, who won 9.77% of the vote. Despite concerns that it could fall short of the 10% election threshold, the party put forward party-lists instead of running independent candidates in the subsequent June 2015 general election. Exceeding expectations, it polled at 13.12%, becoming the third largest parliamentary group. The party briefly participated in the interim election government formed by AKP Prime Minister Ahmet Davutoğlu on 28 August 2015, with HDP MPs Ali Haydar Konca and Müslüm Doğan becoming the Minister of European Union Affairs and the Minister of Development respectively. The party governs the municipalities in which they have won the elections in a co-mayoralty constituted by a woman and a man.

Witnessing the 2016 Turkish coup attempt and pointing out previous repression of democratic forces by martial powers, the HDP strongly opposed the coup. The HDP was first ignored and left out of the post-coup national truce while the Turkish purges targeted alleged members of the Gülen movement. From September 2016, the Turkish judiciary started to submit HDP elected officials to anti-terrorism accusations. Several HDP parliamentarians have been imprisoned in November 2016 including the party co-chairs Selahattin Demirtaş, and Figen Yüksekdağ, widely disturbing the HDP's ability to communicate and be active on the political scene. In December 2020 HDP co-deputy head for local governments, Salim Kaplan said that "since 2016, 20,000 of our members have been taken into custody and more than 10,000 of our members and executives have been sent to jail", and 48 municipalities have been seized by the government. The ruling AKP accuses the HDP of having direct links with the PKK, and the party had been defending itself against prohibition in March 2021, until the case was dropped.

== Overview ==
The HDP first participated in the 2014 local elections, where it ran in most provinces in western Turkey while the DBP ran in the Kurdish south-east. The two parties combined gained 6.2% of the total votes but HDP failed to win any municipalities. The 21 MPs from the Peace and Democracy Party, the predecessor of the DBP, joined the HDP on 28 August 2014. For the June 2015 general election, the HDP took the decision to field candidates as a party despite the danger of potentially falling below the 10% threshold. Even though most of the politicians from HDP are secular left-wing Kurds, the candidate list included devout Muslims, socialists, Alevis, Armenians, Assyrians, Azerbaijanis, Circassians, Lazi, Romanis and LGBT activists. Of the 550 candidates, 268 were women. In 2015, Barış Sulu was the first openly gay parliamentary candidate in Turkey as a candidate of the HDP. Support for the HDP among Alevis rose from 7% to 16% between June 2015 and June 2018.

== Foundation ==
=== Peoples' Democratic Congress ===
The People's Democratic Party originates from the Peoples' Democratic Congress (Halkların Demokratik Kongresi, HDK), a platform composed of various groups including left wing parties Revolutionary Socialist Workers' Party (DSIP), Labour Party (EMEP), Socialist Party of the Oppressed (ESP), Socialist Democracy Party (SDP), Socialist Party of Refoundation, the Greens and the Left Party of the Future, the Peace and Democracy Party (BDP), some far-left factions, feminist groups, LGBT groups, trade unions and ethnic initiatives representing Alevis, Armenians, and Pomaks. In the 2011 general election, the HDK fielded 61 independent candidates in order to bypass the 10% parliamentary threshold under the 'Labour, Democracy and Freedom Block'. 36 members were elected, though the election of Hatip Dicle was later annulled by the Supreme Electoral Council and this number subsequently fell to 35.

Fatma Gök, one of the HDP's founding chairpersons, described the HDK as a means of providing political hope to citizens and also as a way of intervening in the Turkish political system. The HDK operated by organising conferences and congresses, establishing the HDP as a means of fulfilling their political goals and establishing a means of having political influence.

=== Founding principles ===
The formal application of the HDK for political party status was delivered to the Ministry of the Interior on 15 October 2012. One of the party's chairpersons, Yavuz Önen, claimed that the party would be the political wing of the HDK and not a replacement for it.

The HDP was described by its founding chairpersons as a party that aims to eliminate the exploitation of labour and to fundamentally re-establish a democracy in which honourable and humanitarian individuals can live together as equal citizens. It was further described as a party aiming to bring about fundamental change to the existing Capitalist system though uniting a wide range of left-wing opposition movements. Gök claimed that any political movement with similar aims to the HDK that had not merged with the party was more than welcome to do so. However, Önen claimed that the HDP would be entering elections as an individual party and not as part of a wider electoral alliance, adding that the party is itself formed of a wide coalition of political forces in the first place.

Concerns were raised that the inclusion of the Kurdish nationalist HDK member Peace and Democracy Party (BDP) in the HDP would raise allegations that the HDP was also a mainly Kurdish orientated party. However, Önen claimed that the HDP's key goal was to establish a different perspective of viewing the Turkish political scene and moving away from the existing 'Kurdish versus Turkish' dichotomy that had become institutionally entrenched within Turkish political perceptions. Three outstanding parliamentarians of the BDP, Sebahat Tuncel, Sırrı Süreyya Önder, and Ertuğrul Kürkçü abdicated in October 2013 to join the HDP. Levent Tüzel, former Labour Party chairman and independent member of parliament also joined the three to form a caucus. In April 2014, 24 more parliamentarians from the BDP joined the HDP, which following formed a parliamentary group.

=== Split with the Labour Party ===
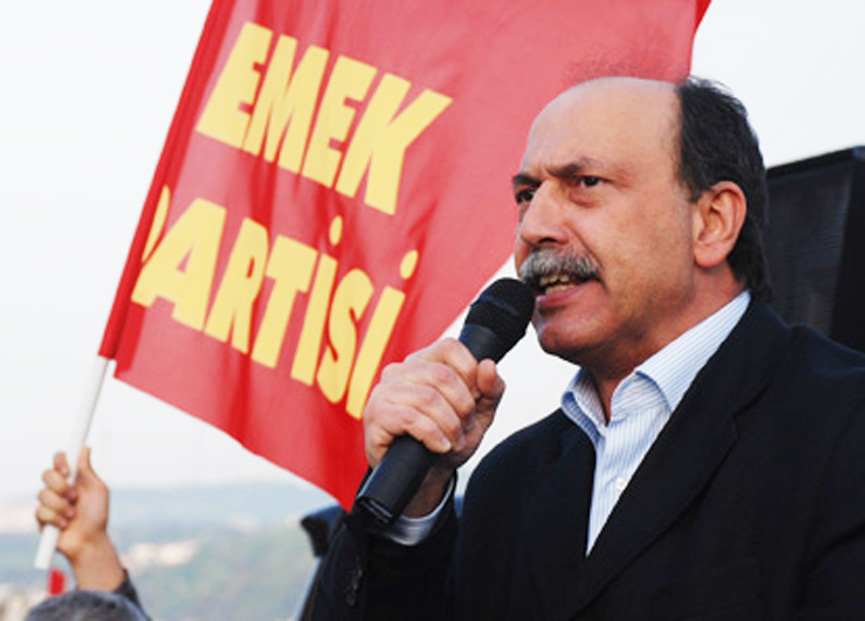
Labour Party founder Abdullah Levent Tüzel joined the HDP parliamentary caucus despite party's split with the HDP.

The Labour Party (EMEP) had been a member of the Peoples' Democratic Congress and had participated in the establishment of the HDP in 2012. However, the EMEP released a statement on 17 June 2014, announcing a split with the HDP. The split was attributed to the restructuring of the Kurdish nationalist Peace and Democracy Party (BDP) into a local-only party under the new name Democratic Regions Party (DBP), while the BDP's parliamentary caucus would be integrated into the HDP. This would, in turn, require the HDP's constitution to be altered in order to ensure greater compliance and conformity with the ideology of the BDP. This caused the EMEP to formally announce their secession from the HDP, but stated that they would continue their participation with the HDK. Despite the split, the Labour Party endorsed the HDP presidential candidate Selahattin Demirtaş for the 2014 presidential election and also announced that they would not be running in the June 2015 general election.

== Ideology ==
The HDP is seen as the Turkish variant of the Greek SYRIZA and the Spanish Podemos parties, similar in their anti-capitalist stance. The founding co-chairs of the HDP, Yavuz Önen and Fatma Gök, both emphasized the HDP's fundamental principle of rejecting capitalism and "labour exploitation" for the benefit of all Turkish citizens regardless of race, gender or religion. The party in this sense is therefore secular, though has refrained from endorsing the secularism enshrined in the principles of Mustafa Kemal Atatürk. The HDP has also called for a new constitution that enshrines minority rights for Kurds, Alevis and other minorities.

Kurdish peoples living in Turkey have long been a persecuted minority, or forcibly assimilated. This has led them to support leftist and parties which defended Kurdish cultural rights. This began with the People's Labor Party (HEP) and continued with the Freedom and Equality Party (ÖZEP) in June 1992, the Freedom and Democracy Party (ÖZDEP) in October 1992, the Democracy Party (DEP) in 1993, the People's Democracy Party (HADEP) in 1994, the Democratic People's Party (DEHAP) in 1997, the Democratic Society Party (DTP) in 2005, the Peace and Democracy Party (BDP) in 2008 and finally the Democratic Regions Party (DBP) in 2014. Most of these parties were closed down for allegedly violating the constitution. In January 2022, the HDP did not sign or participate in the joint statement in the Turkish parliament regarding the protests in Kazakhstan. While HDP was facing a closure case, it transferred its political activities to the Peoples' Equality and Democracy Party (DEM). While the HDP is also affiliated with the Peace and Democracy Party and the Democratic Regions Party, it aims to establish a new perspective that overcomes the traditional Turkish versus Kurdish divide. The HDP instead aims to collectively represent people of all ethnic or religious backgrounds and to safeguard their civil liberties by bringing about direct democracy and an end to capitalist exploitation. The party has long advocated the establishment of local 'people's parliaments' to increase democratic representation and decentralisation of power. Much of the party's attempts to unite citizens throughout Turkey is through the opposition to the governing conservative Justice and Development Party (AKP), which the HDP has accused of being authoritarian, exploitative and discriminatory against religious minorities. The HDP's foreign policy also involves opening the border to Armenia which has been closed since 1993 due to Turkey support of Azerbaijan during the first Nagorno-Karabakh War. The HDP is the only major political party in Turkey that does not support Armenian genocide denial and urges Turkey to set up a truth commission and take responsibility regarding their role in World War I. Although the HDP has been part of anti-NATO protests before, the party has abstained from participating in parliamentary votes on NATO enlargement, such as the votes regarding Sweden and Finland in the Grand National Assembly. At the same time, some HDP MPs have previously been members of the Turkish Group of the NATO Parliamentary Assembly. The party's women branch criticized that the decision to withdraw from the Istanbul Convention which protects the rights of women, was taken by a single man.

During a conference in Selahattin Demirtaş's presidential election campaign, the HDP had caused controversy by not displaying any Turkish flags. In response, Demirtaş had maintained that the HDP respected the flag, stating that the flag represented all citizens of Turkey. The party addresses a wide spectrum of voters, having had candidates of different gender and social, national and religious background. A high proportion of women, as well as Alevi, Armenian, Yazidi, and Assyrian candidates mixed with Turkish left-wing politician candidates played a major role towards the success in the parliamentary elections of June 2015.

=== December 2016 attacks ===
At around 21:30 (UTC+3) on December 17, 2016, four masked people attacked the Peoples' Democratic Party (HDP) office in the Beylikdüzü district of Istanbul, which is located at a shopping mall. The attackers managed to overcome the security personnel and started a fire which caused the explosions of the two gas tubes inside the building. One police officer and a security guard sustained minor injuries. That same night, shots were fired by unidentified assailants at the HDP headquarters in Darıca, Kocaeli Province. Attacks on other HDP offices across the country were also reported, including İzmir, Çanakkale, Hatay, Ankara, and Erzincan.

== Relations with the Kurdistan Workers' Party ==
The HDP maintained talks with Abdullah Öcalan through which Öcalan gave a message to the congress stating that "We have never considered our movement apart from Turkey's revolutionary and socialist movements. We have always regarded ourselves as an integral part of this outcome" and "we have to consider the HDP as an integral part of the historical democratic dialogue and negotiation process. If socialism and an open democracy succeed in Turkey, it will be closely related to this democratic negotiation process." Öcalan's niece Dilek Öcalan was and nephew Ömer Öcalan is a member of parliament. The relationship between the HDP and the PKK has been put forward by the governing Justice and Development Party (AKP) as a reason why it would be better for the HDP to not gain representation in Parliament, though government journalists alleged that this would result in greater violence by the PKK and attempts to establish a separate parliament in Diyarbakır. In contrast, HDP politicians also accused the AKP of scaremongering when they claimed that their affiliation to the PKK made them unfit for parliamentary representation. PKK militants have also been accused of raiding local shops and cafes in the south-east of Turkey and demanding votes for the HDP, with one civilian being wounded when a group of PKK youth militants raided a cafe in Silvan. Selahattin Demirtaş has denied having an 'organic relationship' with the PKK and claimed that the allegations of PKK militants demanding votes for the HDP from voters was untrue.

== Legal prosecutions ==
According to the pro-government daily Daily Sabah, the HDP members have long been accused of voicing their support for the Kurdistan Workers' Party and glorifying terrorism committed by the organization. Selahattin Demirtas, whose older brother is a member of the Kurdistan Workers' Party, has been accused by pro-Turkish government newspaper Daily Sabah of supporting the PKK's leader Abdullah Öcalan in a 2016 speech in Nowruz. Members of the party have been also accused of providing financial support to the PKK and attending the funeral of killed rebels. On 15 June 2016, the HDP was criticized after its members attended the funeral of Eylem Yaşa, a suicide bomber who had killed police officers and civilians, and injured 51 others in Istanbul. In July 2018, a prosecutor initiated an investigation into the attendance of Feleknas Uca and Mehmet Rüştü Tiryaki to a funeral ceremony of a member of the People's Defence Forces (HPG), the armed wing of the PKK in their electoral district Batman. In November 2016 the party Co-Chairs MPs Selahattin Demirtaş and Figen Yüksekdağ as well as the HDP MPs Nursel Aydogan, Idris Baluken, Leyla Birlik, Ferhat Encü, Selma Irmak, Abdullah Zeydan, Nihat Akdoğan and Gülser Yildirim have been arrested.

From September 2016 onward, the Turkish judiciary started submitting HDP supporters, staff and elected officials to anti-terrorism accusations. On the 20 May 2016, the Turkish Parliament voted in favor to enabling the lifting of MPs immunity, following which 54 of the 59 HDP MPs were prosecuted on terrorism-related charges. As of June 2017, more than 10 HDP representatives were under arrest, widely disturbing the HDP's ability to communicate and remain active in the political scene. On June 5, the Turkish interior ministry announced that 130 people who are outside the country while being suspected of militant links will lose their citizenship unless they return to Turkey within three months and meet government standards. Three of the suspects are HDP leaders: Faysal Sarıyıldız, Tuğba Hezer Öztürk, and Özdal Üçer. In March 2018, it was reported that 11'000 HDP members have been detained, of which more than 3000 have been arrested. Also in the days the local elections of March 2019, dozens of candidates for municipal councils were arrested over terror charges. The Council of Europe reported, that after the elections were held, six elected mayors as well as dozens of elected members of the municipal council were not allowed to assume their posts for having been dismissed during the state of emergency following the attempted coup d'état in 2016. The HDP appealed to the court that they should be allowed to assume, but the constitutional court denied the request. The HDP reported that after the municipal elections in 2014, more than 90 elected mayors of the HDP ally Democratic Regions Party (DBP) have been dismissed and dozens of them have been arrested as well. In 2016, the Interior Ministry filed a criminal complaint about four HDP members, including former deputy Mülkiye Birtane, for making terror propaganda.

On 1 March 2018, the HDP's deputy Dilek Öcalan, the niece of Abdullah Öcalan, the founding leader of the PKK, was sentenced to two years and six months in prison for making terror propaganda. Two months later, the membership of two deputies, Osman Baydemir and Selma Irmak, were revoked after they were convicted and sentenced on criminal charges related to the PKK. In the same month, the former deputy Aysel Tuğluk was sentenced to ten years in prison for being a member of a terror organization (PKK).

In August 2018, a former deputy Leyla Birlik fled to Greece where she reportedly sought asylum. According to the Turkish sources, she had been arrested in November 2016 for making terror propaganda and released pending trial, but she had left the country despite her travelling ban.

On 11 August 2018, one of the deputies of the party, Mahmud Togrul, was sentenced to 2 1/2 years in prison for making terror propaganda. Two months later, the former lawmaker Sırrı Süreyya Önder was sentenced to three years and six months in jail for spreading terror propaganda.

In September 2020, the Turkish Government ordered the detention of the current mayor of Kars Ayhan Bilgen, together with other prominent HDP figures like the former MPs Ayla Akat Ata or Sırri Süreyya Önder due to their support of the Kobani protests in 2014 which were held in support of the Kurdish population besieged in Kobani by the Islamic State of Iraq and the Levant (ISIL). By October 2020, Duvar reported that only six out of the sixty-five elected mayors of the HDP were still acting as mayors. The other mayors were replaced by state imposed trustees of the Turkish Ministry of the Interior. In June 2020, Leyla Güven and Musa Farisogullari were stripped of their parliamentarian immunity and arrested. Two of their MPs had to defend themselves from having attended a Democracy March in protest of the dismissal of Farisoğullari and Güven in the midst of the spark of the COVID-19 pandemic. Since February 2021, several parliamentarians are faced with investigations into the lifting of their parliamentarian immunity due to the parties involvement in the protests during the Siege of Kobani in October 2014. Ömer Faruk Gergerlioğlu was stripped of his parliamentary membership on 17 March 2021 due a conviction for spreading "terror propaganda" in a tweet of 2016 supporting eventual peace negotiations with the PKK. On the same day the state prosecutor of the Supreme Court of Appeals Bekir Şahin filed a lawsuit demanding the closure of the HDP at the Constitutional Court of Turkey due to the parties alleged organizational links with the PKK. He also called for a five-year ban from politics for 687 HDP politicians. Amongst the politicians who are to be banned from politics figure all former party leaders including Selahattin Demirtaş and Figen Yüksekdağ and dozens of former and current members of parliament.

== Kurdish peace process ==
The Turkish Justice and Development Party (AKP) government began a peace process with the PKK in 2013, consisting of a withdrawal of militants from Turkish soil and negotiations towards normalisation following nearly 30 years of armed conflict between Kurdish rebels and the Turkish Armed Forces. As a strong advocate of minority rights, the HDP was involved in negotiations with both the government and also the imprisoned PKK leader Abdullah Öcalan on İmralı Island.

=== Relations with the Justice and Development Party ===
Despite being a left-wing party, the HDP has been accused of negotiating with the conservative orientated right-wing Justice and Development Party (AKP) behind closed doors on issues mainly surrounding the Solution process to the Kurdish separatist militants. Critics of the government and the HDP alleged that such talks could lead to a potential coalition between the AKP and HDP in the event that the HDP enters parliament and the AKP does not win a majority. Such a coalition could potentially deliver Kurdish nationalist demands to the south-east of Turkey while the HDP support the AKP's long-time policy of introducing a presidential system in place of the existing parliamentary system. In March, AKP Deputy Prime Minister Bülent Arınç claimed that the HDP would be their partners in the solution process and expressed his wish to work in harmony, though also accused some HDP MPs of not working towards lasting peace with sincerity. In contrast, government minister Bekir Bozdağ accused the HDP of being part of an 'international project' intending to destabilise the government of Turkey. Relations seemed to sour in early April, where the HDP accused the AKP of staging a pre-planned attack against PKK members in the province of Ağrı aimed at gathering more votes in the upcoming general election. In response, Deputy Prime Minister Yalçın Akdoğan accused Selahattin Demirtaş of acting like a PKK spokesman. In February 2015, HDP chairwoman Figen Yüksekdağ claimed that a joint statement regarding the solution process could be made with the AKP. Delegations from the AKP and the HDP formally met in the Prime Minister's office in Dolmabahçe Palace in April 2015. After a raid on the HDP office in Esenyurt, Istanbul in January 2021, Interior Minister Süleyman Soylu shared a video flashing images of Abdullah Öcalan, criticizing the European Court of Human Rights for their verdicts. The HDP responded that the same images are already used by the HDP themselves since over six months in their press releases. The Presidential spokesperson Fahrettin Altun equated the HDP with the PKK.

=== 2014 siege of Kobanî protests ===
The peace process was nearly disbanded after pro-Kurdish protests and riots broke out in south-eastern Turkey protesting the lack of government intervention against the advance of ISIL militants on the city of Kobanî in Syria, just south of the Turkish border. The HDP openly supported the protests, while calling for non-violence. Protestors were met with tear gas and water cannon, leading to more than 40 deaths. Prime Minister Ahmet Davutoğlu heavily criticised the HDP for calling for more protests and responded by drafting a heavily controversial domestic security bill and calling for the HDP to prove itself to be a peaceful political party. Nevertheless, the solution process continued despite the riots, with ISIL being completely ejected from Kobanî by April 2015. HDP MP Altan Tan later claimed that his party had miscalculated the consequences of calling for more protests, although his statements were met with opposition from the confederalist KCK organisation.

== Historical leaders ==
The HDP operates a co-presidential system, whereby the party is chaired by one chairman and one chairwoman, elected during party congresses. Since its establishment in 2012, the party has had a total of ten leaders, five men and five women. The current leaders were elected at the 4th Congress of the Peoples' Democratic Party on the 23 February 2020.

=== Chairpersons ===
The following is a list of the current and previous chairpersons of the HDP, showing the names, birth and death dates where applicable and also the start and end dates of their leadership.

No.	Chairman (Born–Died)	Portrait	Chairwoman (Born–Died)	Portrait	Term in Office	
1	Yavuz Önen (1938–)		Fatma Gök (1948–)		15 October 2012	27 October 2013
2	Ertuğrul Kürkçü (1948–)		Sebahat Tuncel (1975–)		27 October 2013	22 June 2014
3	Selahattin Demirtaş (1973–)		Figen Yüksekdağ (1971–)		22 June 2014	9 March 2017
4	Selahattin Demirtaş (1973–)		Serpil Kemalbay (1964–)		9 March 2017	11 February 2018
5	Sezai Temelli (1963–)		Pervin Buldan (1967–)		11 February 2018	23 February 2020
6	Mithat Sancar (1963–)		Pervin Buldan (1967–)		23 February 2020	27 August 2023
7	Cahit Kırkazak (1979–)		Sultan Özcan (1965–)		27 August 2023	Terminated

=== Honorary Presidents ===
In the Extraordinary HDP congress held on 22 June 2014, the outgoing co-chairpersons Ertuğrul Kürkçü and Sebahat Tuncel was by an amendment in the HDP Bylaw awarded the status of the Honorary Presidents. Kürkçü and Tuncel are the first co-presidents to serve in that capacity.

No.	President (male) (Born–Died)	Portrait	President (female) (Born–Died)	Portrait	Term in Office	
1	Ertuğrul Kürkçü (1948–)		Sebahat Tuncel (1975–)		22 June 2014	Incumbent

== Party congresses ==
The party has held several ordinary congresses throughout different cities, mostly focussing on provinces in south-eastern Turkey. So far, the party has had two nationwide extraordinary congresses, held in 2013 and 2014, where elections were held to select the chairpersons of the party.

=== 1st Extraordinary congress, 2013 ===
The party's 1st extraordinary congress was held in the Ahmet Taner Kışlalı Stadium in Ankara on 27 October 2013. The HDP Executive Board and the Congressional Preparation Council both recommended Ertuğrul Kürkçü and Sebahat Tuncel for the positions of chairman and chairwoman respectively, after which both formally assumed their positions. The congress focussed mainly in voicing support for the Gezi Park protests. A message from the imprisoned PKK leader Abdullah Öcalan, emphasizing the party's support for a decentralization of power and for the establishment of localized 'people's parliaments', was also read out. 105 sitting and 25 reserve members were elected to the Party Council.

=== 2nd Extraordinary congress, 2014 ===
The party's 2nd extraordinary congress was again held in the Ahmet Taner Kışlalı Stadium on 22 June 2014. 156 delegates were eligible to cast votes to elect the new chairman and chairwoman. Since a majority could not be secured in the first two rounds of voting, the leadership election proceeded into a third round where Selahattin Demirtaş was elected as the chairman and Figen Yüksekdağ was elected as the chairwoman of the party. Speeches by the elected leaders mainly centred on the corruption within the Turkish government and also opposition to the established political system. 100 sitting and 50 reserve members for the Party Council were elected. Outgoing chairpersons Ertuğrul Kürkçü and Sebahat Tuncel were declared Honorary Presidents of the party.

=== 3rd Extraordinary Congress, 2017 ===
In the HDPs 3rd Extraordinary Congress on 20 May 2017, Serpil Kemalbay was elected as the new chairwoman while Selahattin Demirtaş was confirmed as its chairman. The party's previous female party leader, Figen Yüksekdağ, had been imprisoned in November 2016, and the Turkish Parliament revoked her parliamentary membership on the 21 February 2017 and on the 9 March 2017 the Supreme Court of Appeal ruled she was no longer a member of the HDP.

== Election results ==
Formed in 2012, the HDP has since contested two local, two presidential and three general election. A summary of the results and number of candidates elected is shown below.

=== Local elections ===
Local elections
Election date	Party leaders	Popular Vote	Percentage	Municipalities		Councillors		Map
Election date	Party leaders	Popular Vote	Percentage	Metropolitan	District	Municipal	Provincial	
2014	Ertuğrul Kürkçü; Sebahat Tuncel	2,611,127	6.29%	2 / 30	97 / 1,351	1,441 / 20,458	129 / 1,251	
2019	Sezai Temelli Pervin Buldan	2,409,485	5.60%	3 / 30	57 / 1,351	1,230 / 20,745	101 / 1,272	

==== 2014 local elections ====
At the 2014 municipal elections, HDP ran parallel to BDP, with the BDP running in Turkey's Kurdish-dominated southeast while the HDP competed in the rest of the country except Mersin Province and Konya Province where BDP launched its own candidates.

After the local elections, the two parties were re-organised in a joint structure. On 28 April 2014, the entire parliamentary caucus of BDP joined HDP, whereas BDP (itself re-organised as the Democratic Regions Party by July) was assigned exclusively to representatives on the local administration level.

=== Presidential elections ===
Presidential elections
Election date	Candidate	Votes	Percentage	Position
2014	Selahattin Demirtaş	3,958,048	9.77	3rd
2018	Selahattin Demirtaş	4,205,219	8.40	3rd

==== 2014 presidential election ====
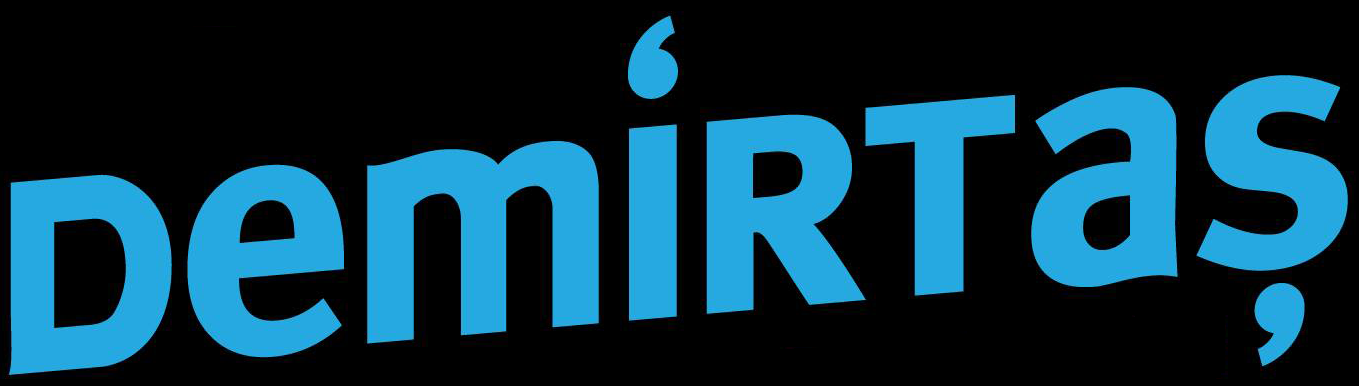
Selahattin Demirtaş's election campaign logo

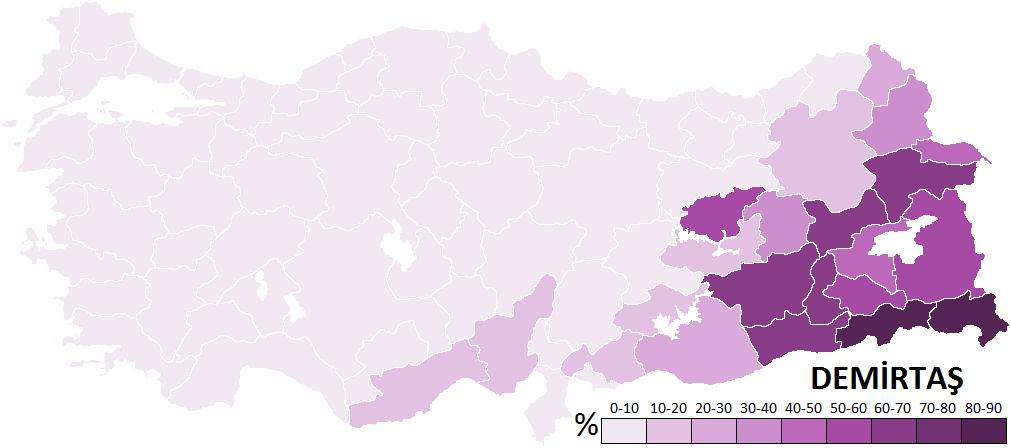
Votes obtained by Demirtaş throughout the 81 Provinces of Turkey

Selahattin Demirtaş was announced as the HDP's candidate for the Presidency on 30 June. In a campaign dominated by the Solution process with Kurdish rebels, he claimed on 5 August in Van that the government of Recep Tayyip Erdoğan had not done enough to bring forward promised legislation, and that the process would collapse immediately if the AKP did not do more to bring lasting peace in the southeast.

On 15 July, Demirtaş outlined his road-map for his presidency should he win the election. In a speech lasting just under an hour, he proposed that the Presidency of Religious Affairs (Diyanet) should be disbanded, that compulsory religion lessons in schools should be removed and that Cemevis (the Alevi houses of worship) should receive national recognition. He also proposed the introduction of "People's Parliaments" (Cumhur meclisleri), which would also incorporate Youth Parliaments to increase representation of young citizens. Pushing for a new constitution, Demirtaş outlined the need to end the non-representation of different cultures, languages, races and beliefs without delay to ensure national stability. Also in his speech, he praised the Gezi Park protests and displayed photos of himself during the events. He continued to direct applause to the mother of the murdered teenager Berkin Elvan, who died 269 days after being hit by a tear gas canister during the protests and falling into a coma. On the issue of the lack of Turkish flags within the hall in which he was delivering his speech, Demirtaş stated that the Turkish flag represented all citizens of Turkey. His slogan is "Bir Cumhurbaşkanı Düşün" (Imagine a President...), which is followed by several different phrases, such as "Bir Cumhurbaşkanı Düşünün Ayrımcılık yapmıyor. Birleştiriyor, barıştırıyor." (Imagine a President who doesn't Discriminate, who Unites and makes Peace) or "Bir Cumhurbaşkanı Düşünün Herkese Demokrat" (Imagine a President who is Democratic to Everybody). Most of the votes that were cast for Demirtaş were from the Kurdish south-east.

Votes obtained by the HDP presidential candidate Selahattin Demirtaş by province

Province	Votes	Percent
Adana	114,035	10.6%
Adıyaman	43,626	15.3%
Ağrı	121,512	61.3%
Aydın	41,568	6.9%
Afyon	5,430	1.3%
Aksaray	2,679	1.4%
Amasya	2,262	1.2%
Ankara	94,756	3.5%
Antalya	58,046	5.3%
Ardahan	11,663	23.1%
Artvin	2,307	2.4%
Balıkesir	21,111	2.8%
Bartın	2,578	2.3%
Batman	134,266	60%
Bayburt	293	0.7%
Bilecik	3,701	3%
Bingöl	37,335	30.5%
Bitlis	60,448	43.7%
Bolu	2,645	1.6%
Burdur	3,222	2.1%
Bursa	64,133	4.1%
Çanakkale	8,690	2.7%
Çankırı	1,015	1%
Çorum	4,820	1.5%
Denizli	18,644	3.3%
Diyarbakır	409,681	64.1%
Düzce	3,670	1.8%
Edirne	6,876	2.8%
Elazığ	30,949	10.9%
Erzincan	5,029	4%
Eskişehir	12,444	2.6%
Erzurum	47,477	13%
Gaziantep	82,659	10.5%
Giresun	3,358	1.4%
Gümüşhane	768	1.1%
Hakkari	102,342	81.6%
Hatay	28,151	3.6%
Iğdır	30,227	42.9%
Isparta	4,014	1.7%
Istanbul	648,608	9.1%
İzmir	187,405	8%
Kahramanmaraş	22,928	4.3%
Karabük	1,733	1.4%
Karaman	2,182	1.6%
Kars	41,187	32.9%
Kastamonu	3,007	1.4%
Kayseri	13,182	1.8%
Kilis	2,229	3.8%
Kırklareli	4,836	2.3%
Kırıkkale	1,762	1.2%
Kırşehir	5,892	4.9%
Kocaeli	48,713	5.5%
Konya	33,671	3%
Kütahya	3,960	1.1%
Malatya	21,495	5.3%
Manisa	45,828	5.6%
Mardin	198,345	60.9%
Mersin	122,134	13.4%
Muğla	20,997	4.1%
Muş	105,248	61.2%
Niğde	2,365	1.4%
Nevşehir	2,224	1.4%
Ordu	5,161	1.4%
Osmaniye	6,912	2.8%
Rize	2,103	1.1%
Sakarya	11,425	2.3%
Samsun	8,882	1.3%
Siirt	65,373	54%
Sinop	2,195	1.8%
Sivas	4,226	1.2%
Şanlıurfa	173,691	26.2%
Şırnak	158,569	83.2%
Tekirdağ	22,245	4.4%
Tokat	3,976	1.2%
Trabzon	4,571	1.2%
Tunceli	21,740	52.2%
Uşak	5,278	2.5%
Van	222,670	54.5%
Yalova	7,141	5.8%
Yozgat	2,198	0.9%
Zonguldak	6,494	1.9%

=== General elections ===
General election results of the Peoples' Democratic Party (HDP)
Election	Co-leaders	Vote	Result	Seats	Position	Map
7 June 2015	Selahattin Demirtaş; Figen Yüksekdağ	6,058,489	13.12% ▲13.12 pp	80 / 550 (▲80)	Opposition	
1 November 2015	Selahattin Demirtaş; Figen Yüksekdağ	5,148,085	10.76% ▼2.37 pp	59 / 550 (▼21)	Opposition	
24 June 2018	Sezai Temelli; Pervin Buldan	5,867,302	11.70% ▲0.94 pp	67 / 600 (▲19)	Opposition	

==== June 2015 general election ====
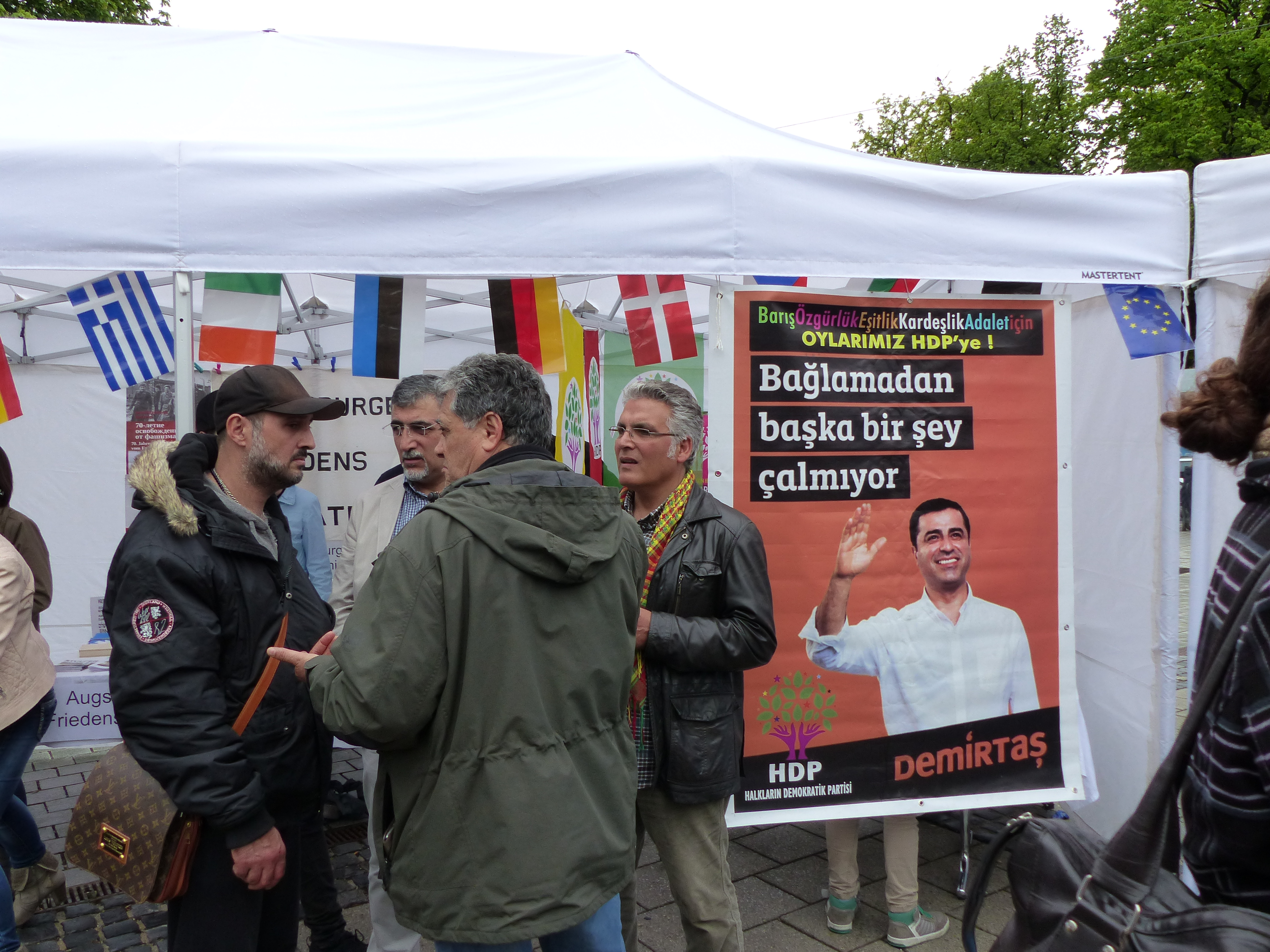
A HDP election stand in Germany, 3 May 2015

Emboldened by the 9.77% of the vote won by HDP co-leader Selahattin Demirtaş in the 2014 presidential election the HDP contested the election by fielding party candidates rather than independent candidates. This was controversial since the HDP's votes would be lost in the event that the HDP failed to win above 10% of the vote. There was speculation as to whether the AKP forced Öcalan to pressure the HDP to contest the election as a party in order to boost their own number of MPs. The party charged a ₺2,000 application fee for prospective male candidates, a ₺1,000 fee for female and young candidates under the age of 27 and no fee was collected from disabled applicants. Applications for candidacy were received between 16 February and 2 March.

According to a private poll conducted by the HDP in January 2015, the party needed to gather around 600,000 more supporters by the general election in order to surpass the election threshold of 10% and win 72 MPs. Polling organisations such as Metropoll, however, predicted that the party would win around 55 MPs if they won more than 10%. HDP candidates hoped that the victory of the left-wing SYRIZA in the January 2015 Greek legislative election in January would result in a boost in popularity.

In order to maximise their votes, the party's co-leader Figen Yüksekdağ announced that the HDP would begin negotiations with the United June Movement, a socialist intellectual and political platform that includes left-wing parties such as the Freedom and Solidarity Party (ÖDP) and the Labour Party (EMEP). Negotiations between parties began taking place in early 2015, with the intention of forming a broad alliance rather than a strict political coalition. Although Yüksekdağ ruled out negotiating with the CHP since they were 'closed to dialogue' and Demirtaş was opposed to negotiations, CHP deputy leader Sezgin Tanrıkulu said that the CHP was open for talks and that the two parties had until 7 April to come to an agreement.

HDP rallied more than expected and gained 13.12% of the total votes cast (6,280,302 out of 46,774,793), breaking the 10% threshold, the minimum set for any Turkish political party to have its representatives sit in the Grand National Assembly of Turkey (TBMM), and securing 81 seats. The HDP carried victories in 14 out of 85 electoral districts in Turkey: Ardahan, Kars, Iğdır, Ağrı Province, Muş, Bitlis, Van, Turkey, Hakkâri, Şırnak, Siirt, Batman, Mardin, Diyarbakır and Tunceli. These electoral districts are mostly Kurdish-majority provinces. In this election, however, the HDP departed from its traditional Kurdish issues-focused role and embraced other minority ethnic and religious groups in Turkey, women's issues, LGBT and left-wing activists and political groups under its wing, promoting its appeal to a national level and drawing a wider pool of support from all over Turkey. This resulted the HDP to be not only the 4th largest political party in the Grand National Assembly of Turkey but also a formidable force in gaining the Turkish overseas votes, ranking 2nd after the AKP with 20.41% and carrying Japan, Ukraine, Greece, Poland, Italy, Switzerland, Sweden, Finland, Canada and the U.K. The HDP also derailed the AKP from being the majority party, forming a single-party government and reaching 330 seats in the Grand National Assembly of Turkey, the necessary number to enact a referendum necessary to change the constitution so that Turkey would abandon its traditional parliamentary government and instead adopt an American-style executive presidency government. This is hailed by Turkey's opposition parties and their supporters as the biggest contribution the HDP made to the Republic of Turkey.

=== 2023 presidential election ===
On 22 March 2023, the HDP declared that they would not field a presidential candidate for the 2023 Turkish presidential election, instead focusing on campaigning against Erdoğan's rule, boosting the chances of the Republican People's Party (CHP) candidate Kemal Kılıçdaroğlu.

On 24 March 2023, the party decided to enter the 2023 Turkish general election from the Green Left Party lists.

== See also ==
- Peoples' Equality and Democracy Party (DEM)
