= Bekir Şahin =

Turkish jurist and judge

Bekir Sahin

State Prosecutor at the Court of Cassations
- Incumbent
- Assumed office June 2020
- Appointed by: Recep Tayyip Erdogan

Personal details
- Born: March 1, 1960 (age 66) Mecitözü, Çorum
- Occupation: Jurist

Bekir Şahin (born 1 March 1960, Mecitözü, Turkey) is a jurist, former judge and the current State Prosecutor of the Court of Cassation in Turkey.

== Education ==
He was educated at the Imam Hatip school and studied law at the Dokuz Eylül University from which he graduated in 1986. Following he entered the public administration and became a judge in courts in a variety of cities.

== Court of Cassation ==
Since 2013, he acted as a member of the Court of Cassation. Between May 2019 and June 2020 he acted as the president of the 14th Chamber of the Court of Cassation. Nominated by President Recep Tayyip Erdogan, he serves as the State Prosecutor at the Court of Cassation (also known as Supreme Court of Appeals) since June 2020.

On the 17 March 2021, he filed a lawsuit calling for the closure of the Peoples' Democratic Party (HDP), alleging they act in cooperation with the Kurdistan Workers' Party (PKK) and against the unity of the state. In the same file, he called for the ban from politics for 600 politicians of the HDP.

== Personal life ==
He is married and has 2 children.
