= 35th Republican People's Party Ordinary Convention =

Party election in Turkey

2016 Republican People's Party leadership election
- 16–17 January 2016
- Turnout: 97.1%
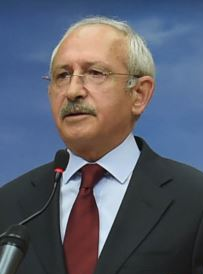
Candidate	Kemal Kılıçdaroğlu
Party	CHP
Constituency	İzmir (II)
Delegate vote	990
Percentage	100.0%
Leader before election
Kemal Kılıçdaroğlu
CHP
Elected Leader
Kemal Kılıçdaroğlu
CHP

The 35th Republican People's Party Ordinary Convention took place on 16 and 17 January 2016, having originally been scheduled for 2014. The convention date was pushed back from 2014, when it was supposed to be held two years after the previous in 2012, due to the 18th Extraordinary Convention that was held in September 2014. It w held shortly after the CHP's defeat in the November 2015 general election. The party was expected to see challengers to the leadership of Kemal Kılıçdaroğlu, however, Kılıçdaroğlu was re-elected with no other candidate challenging him.

In November 2015, Kılıçdaroğlu ruled out any prospect of holding an Extraordinary Convention prior to the scheduled Ordinary Convention despite calls from some CHP MPs, claiming that the preparations for the Ordinary Convention had already begun.

== Leadership election ==
=== Candidates ===
==== Standing ====
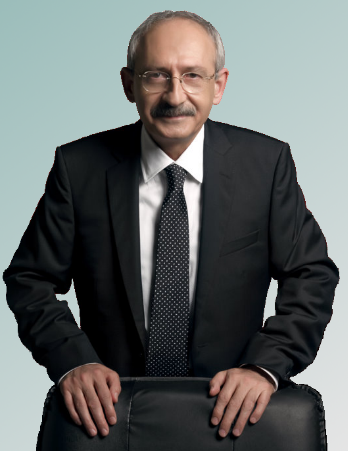
Kemal Kılıçdaroğlu, Member of Parliament for İzmir's second electoral district and incumbent leader of the CHP (announced 14 November 2015)

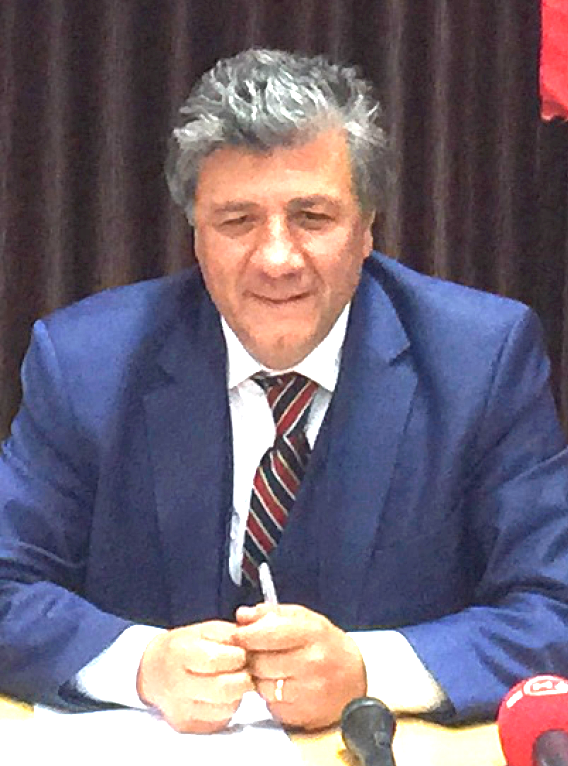
Mustafa Balbay, MP for İzmir (II) and former defendant in the Ergenekon trials
- Kemal Kılıçdaroğlu, Member of Parliament for İzmir's second electoral district and incumbent leader of the CHP (announced 14 November 2015)
- Mustafa Balbay, Member of Parliament for İzmir's second electoral district and former defendant in the Ergenekon trials (announced 11 November 2015)

==== Possible ====
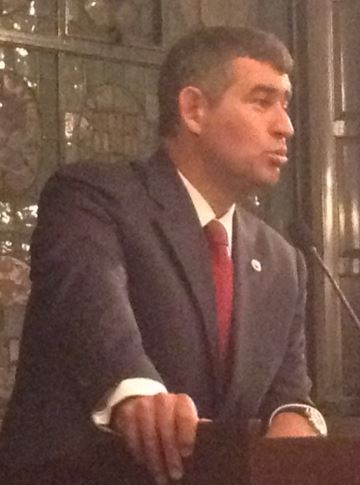
Metin Feyzioğlu, President of the Turkish Bars Association

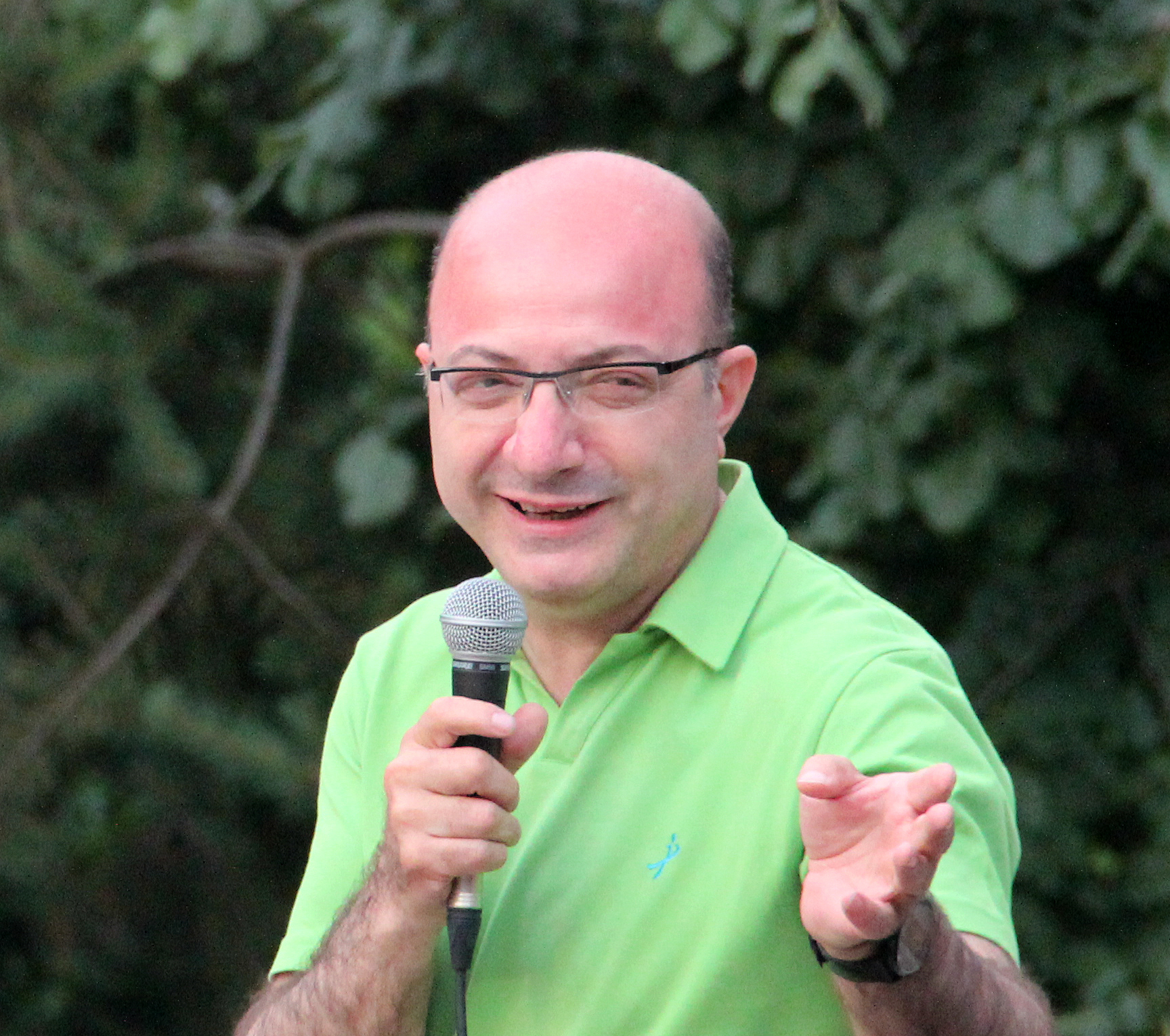
İlhan Cihaner, Member of Parliament for Denizli

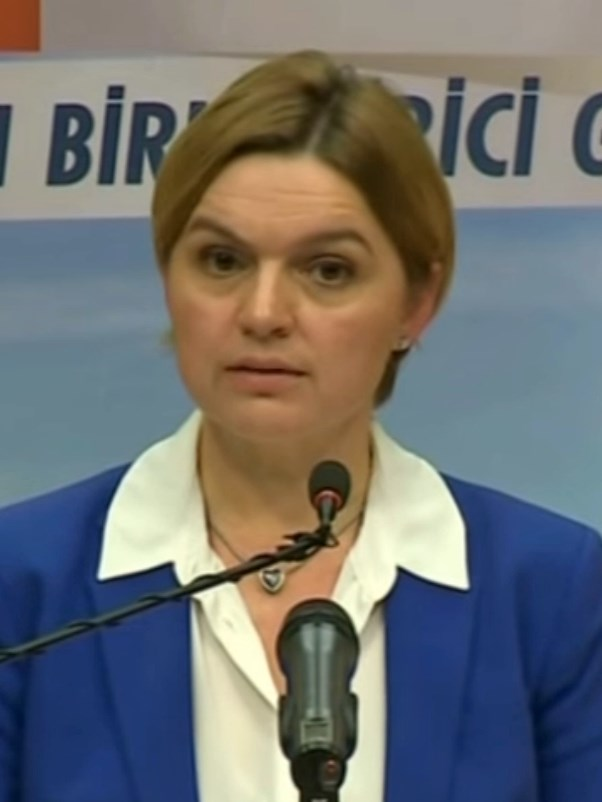
Selin Sayek Böke, Member of Parliament for İzmir's second electoral district and deputy leader of the CHP responsible for economic policy
- Metin Feyzioğlu, President of the Turkish Bars Association
- İlhan Cihaner, Member of Parliament for Denizli
- Selin Sayek Böke, Member of Parliament for İzmir's second electoral district and deputy leader of the CHP responsible for economic policy
- Aykut Erdoğdu, Member of Parliament for İstanbul
- Ümit Kocasakal, President of the İstanbul Bar Association

==== Declined ====
- Tuncay Özkan, Member of Parliament for İzmir (I) who was incriminated during the Ergenekon trials. Announced his support for Kemal Kılıçdaroğlu on 13 November 2015.

==== Withdrew ====
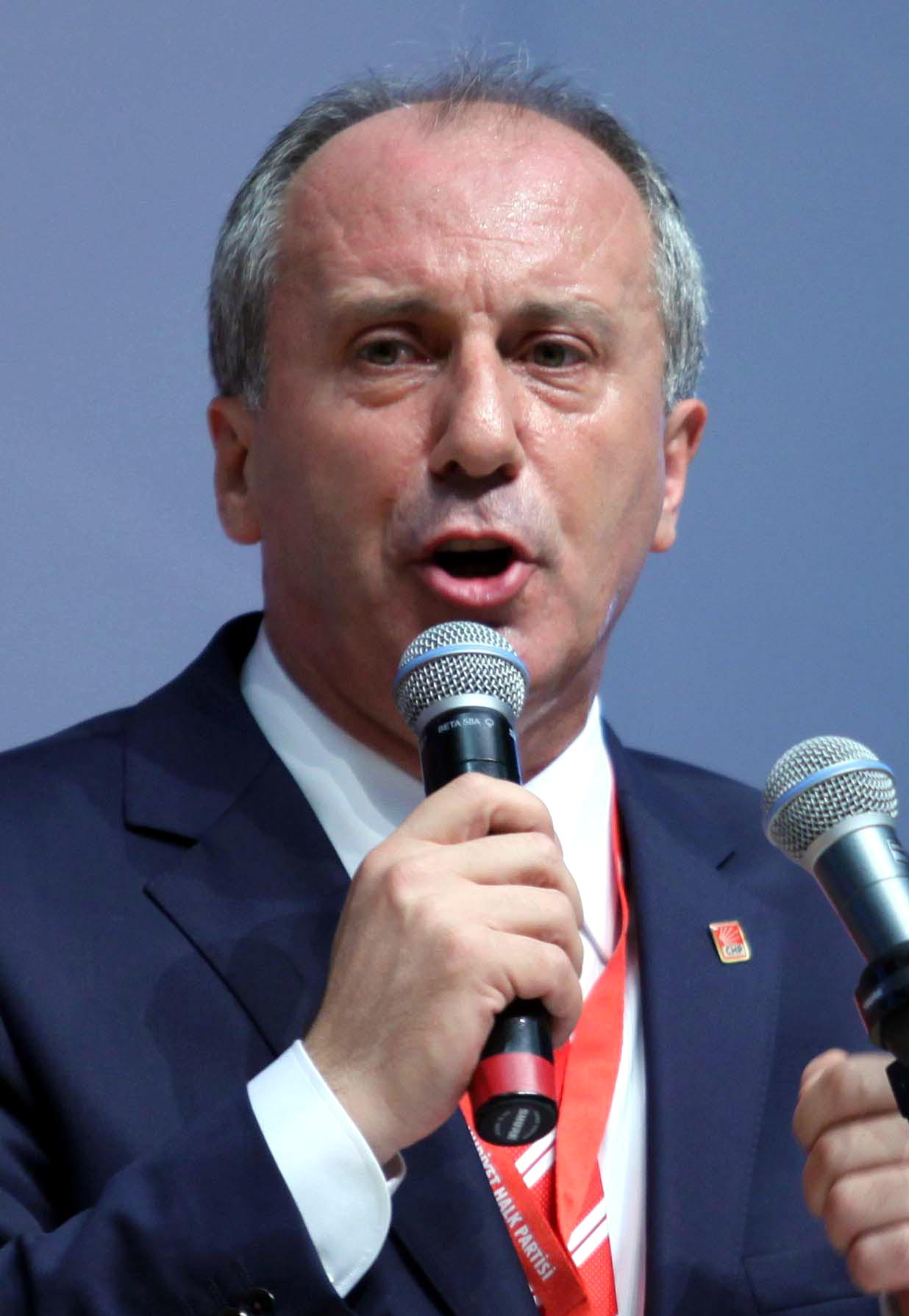
Muharrem İnce, Member of Parliament for Yalova

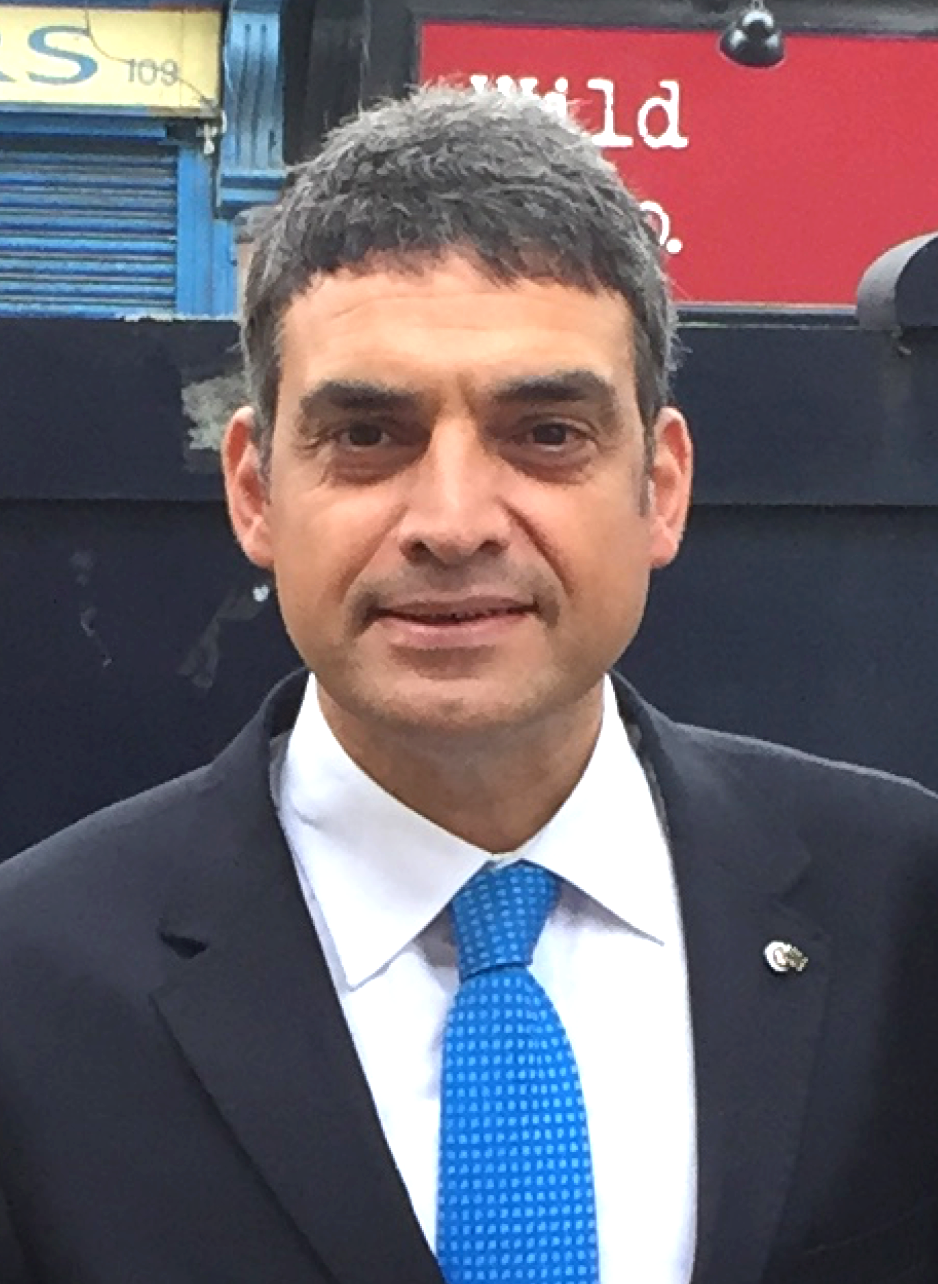
Umut Oran, Vice President of Socialist International, former CHP deputy leader and MP
- Muharrem İnce, Member of Parliament for Yalova (announced 9 November 2015). Withdrew 11 January 2016.
- Umut Oran, Vice President of Socialist International, former CHP deputy leader and former Member of Parliament for İstanbul's third electoral district (announced 4 November 2015). Withdrew on 14 January 2016.

=== Nomination process ===
Out of the 1,275 delegates taking part in the voting process, a candidate needed 127 signatures to contest the leadership election.

=== Results ===
Candidate	Votes	Percentage
Kemal Kılıçdaroğlu	990	100.0
Invalid/blank votes	248	–
Total	1,238	100.0
Number of delegates/turnout	1,275	97.1
