= Umut Oran =

Turkish politician

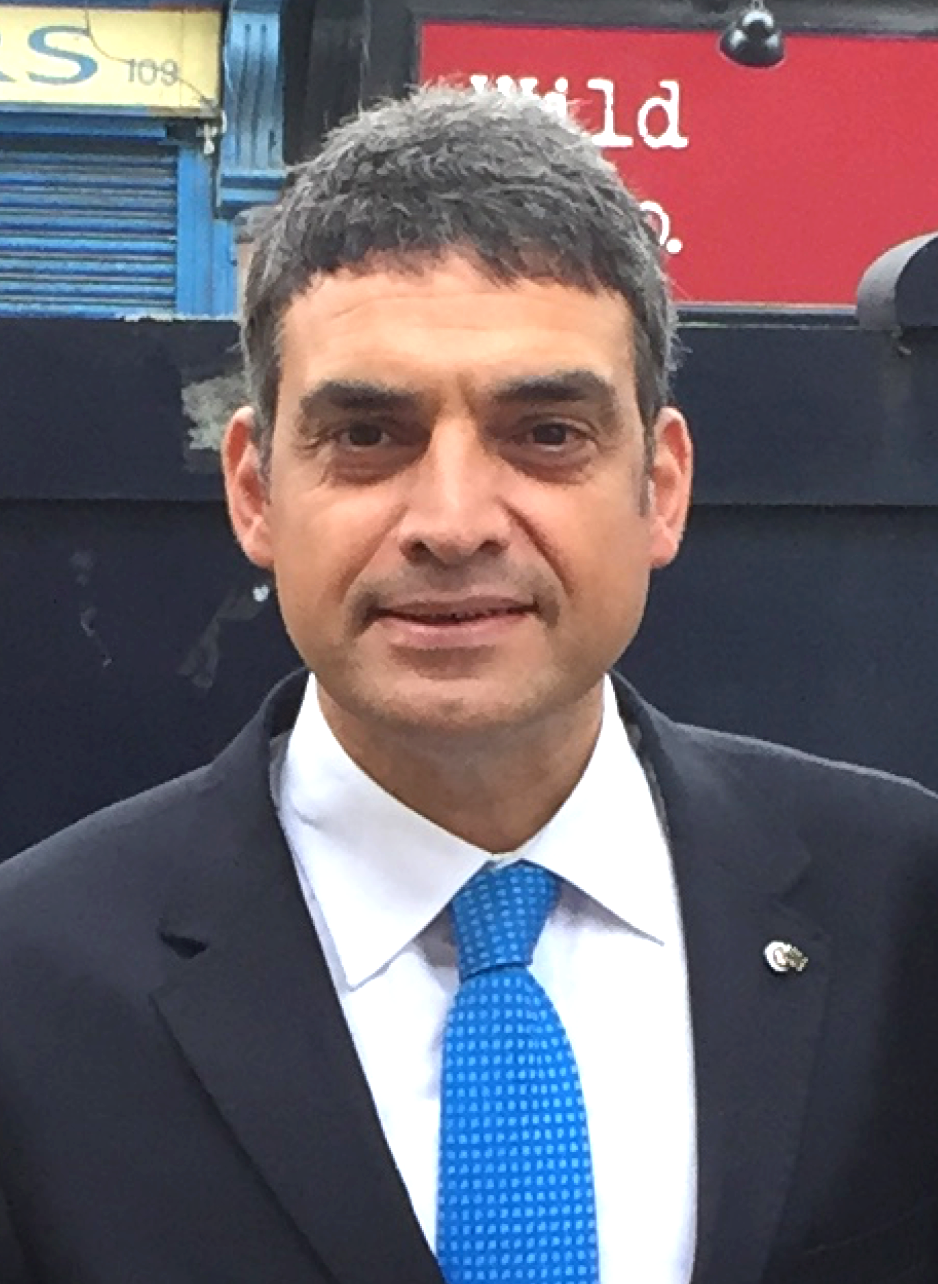

Vice President of Socialist International
- In office 13 December 2014 – 27 January 2018
- President: George Papandreou
- Country: Turkey
- Preceded by: Kemal Kılıçdaroğlu

Member of the Grand National Assembly
- In office 12 June 2011 – 7 June 2015
- Constituency: Istanbul (III) (2011)

Republican People's Party Administrative and Financial Affairs Executive
- In office 30 July 2012 – 8 May 2014
- Leader: Kemal Kılıçdaroğlu
- Preceded by: Erdoğan Toprak
- Succeeded by: Haluk Koç

Deputy leader of the Republican People's Party
- In office 22 May 2010 – 17 August 2011
- Leader: Kemal Kılıçdaroğlu

President of the Bolu Chamber of Commerce and Industry Council
- In office 11 March 2005 – 17 February 2009
- Preceded by: Sebahattin Ahmet Yamaner
- Succeeded by: Ahmet Kahraman

President of the International Apparel Federation
- In office 2 December 2002 – 3 December 2003
- Preceded by: (Netherlands) Frans Schulte
- Succeeded by: (Spain) Pere Prat

Personal details
- Born: 16 October 1962 (age 63) Istanbul, Turkey
- Party: Republican People's Party
- Spouse: Tuna Kekeoğlu (2011-present)
- Education: Marmara University
- Website: umutoran.com

Umut Oran (born 16 October 1962) is a Turkish textile manufacturer and a centre-left politician who currently serves as a vice president of Socialist International since 13 December 2014. He served as a Member of Parliament for Istanbul's 3rd electoral district during the 24th Parliament of Turkey, lasting between 2011 and 2015. He is a member of the Republican People's Party (CHP), having formerly served as a deputy leader of the party and the president of the CHP Administrative and Financial Affairs Department. He served as the president of the International Apparel Federation between 2002 and 2003.

Oran announced his candidacy for the party leadership against the then-incumbent Deniz Baykal during the 2008 Ordinary Convention, but failed to gain enough nominations to run for election. In the 2010 Ordinary Convention, the newly elected leader Kemal Kılıçdaroğlu appointed him as a Deputy party leader. In the 34th Ordinary Convention held in 2012, he became a member of the Party Council. Oran was not fielded as a candidate by Kılıçdaroğlu for the June 2015 general election for unknown reasons, drawing speculation that Kılıçdaroğlu was attempting to eliminate influential CHP politicians seen as a challenger to his leadership. Despite speculation, Oran was not fielded as a candidate for the November 2015 general election either.

On 4 November 2015, shortly after the CHP lost the November 2015 election, Oran announced his candidacy for the party leadership in the upcoming 35th Ordinary Convention due to be held in January 2016.

== Early life and career ==
Oran attended a French high school, namely the Saint Benoît High School, and went on to study economics in English at Marmara University.

=== Early career ===
After his graduation, he began to work at Koç Holding, mainly centring on the Holding's textile department. He also worked at the Öztek textile company before establishing his own company called Domino Textiles in 1992. Focussing on the creation of employment in central Anatolia, Domino Textiles build a factory in Bolu expanding over an open area of 30,000m² and a closed area of 10,000m². While operating under Domino Textiles, Oran allowed workers to have a say in the administration of the company and has since campaigned for greater workers' rights as a politician. 250 workers still continue to work at the factory.

=== Textiles and Clothing industry ===
Oran joined the Turkey Clothing Manufacturers' Association (Türkiye Giyim Sanayicileri Derneği Başkanlığı) in 1993 and was elected as its president in 2002. Under the slogan, 'Employment and Peace in Anatolia', Oran focussed on assisting the economic development of less developed reasons of Anatolia by pushing for tax incentives and greater competition in the textile sector. Developing the association's UFUK 2010 project that had begun in 2001, Oran also pushed for the formal integration of unlicensed workers and for a rise in the minimum wage. The association worked with and had joint platforms with the World Trade Organization and the European Commission on the world stage.

As part of his leadership of the Clothing Manufacturers' Association, Oran was elected to the Presidency of the Bolu Chamber of Commerce and Industry Council in 2005, serving in the role until 2009. The Clothing and Apparel Industry Council, which is part of the Union of Chambers and Commodity Exchanges of Turkey, elected Oran as its Council President on 17 July 2006.

=== Overseas career ===
Oran has been involved in combating the local problems caused throughout the world by globalisation, especially in the textiles industry, by becoming the president of the International Apparel Federation in December 2002, serving for one year until December 2003.

Between 2000 and 2005, Oran served on the executive board of The European Apparel and Textile Organisation (EURATEX). He served as the president of EURATEX's Apparel Department while on the Organisation's executive board.

== Politics ==
Oran was a candidate for the leadership of the Republican People's Party in 2008, but failed to gather enough signatures to nominate himself for election against the serving incumbent Deniz Baykal. He worked closely with both provincial and district CHP branches before becoming a deputy leader of the Party in 2010, under the leadership of Kemal Kılıçdaroğlu. He served as deputy leader until 2011. In the 2011 general election, Oran was elected as a CHP Member of Parliament for Istanbul's 3rd electoral district.

On 18 July 2012, he was elected to the Party Council during the 34th Ordinary Convention, receiving 786 votes (the third highest). He was appointed as the Executive responsible for Administrative and Financial Affairs on 30 July 2012, succeeding Erdoğan Toprak, serving in the position until 8 May 2014.

On 13 December 2014, Oran was elected as a vice president of Socialist International, taking over as the Turkish vice president on the Presidium from Kemal Kılıçdaroğlu. He was, for unknown reasons, left out of the CHP candidate lists for the June 2015 general election, leading to many party supporters accusing Kılıçdaroğlu of trying to eliminate competition against his leadership. Oran stated that he respected Kılıçdaroğlu's decision and remained loyal to his party.

== Personal life ==
Oran is married and speaks French and English. He is also a former professional footballer, serving as a goalkeeper for Galatasaray S.K.
