= Atilla Sertel =

Turkish politician (born 1956)

Atilla Sertel MP

Member of the Grand National Assembly
- In office 1 November 2015 – 14 May 2023
- Constituency: İzmir (II) (Nov 2015, 2018)

President of the Turkish Journalists Federation
- In office 27 September 2009 – 20 February 2015
- Preceded by: Nazmi Bilgin
- Succeeded by: Yılmaz Karaca

Personal details
- Born: 23 July 1956 (age 70) Eskişehir, Turkey
- Party: Republican People's Party
- Other political affiliations: Social Democratic Populist Party (1991)
- Spouse: Ziynet Sertel
- Education: Ege University
- Occupation: Journalist

Atilla Sertel (born 23 July 1956) is a Turkish politician and journalist from the Republican People's Party (CHP) who has previously served as a Member of Parliament for İzmir's second electoral district. He previously served as the President of the Federation of Journalists of Turkey from 2009 to 2015.

== Early life and career ==
Atilla Sertel was born on 23 July 1956 in Eskişehir, completing his primary and secondary education there before graduating from Ege University School of Journalism and Public Relations. During his student years, he began writing for the newspapers Milliyet, Güneş, Yeni Asır and Hürriyet and a news director and columnist. After a failed attempt to get elected to Parliament in 1991, he returned to his journalism career and served as a news director at the Economy Gazette (Ekonomi Gazetesi) and as an editor of Gazete Ege.

In 1989, Sertel worked at the İzmir Metropolitan Municipality as the Press and Public Relations department manager. With his wife Ziynet Sertel, he established Ati Agency Advertising Industry and Trade Limited, later also opening a publishing company. He contributed to the publication of the City and Mayor (Şehir ve Başkan) magazine in 2000.

=== President of the Turkish Journalists Federation ===
Atilla Sertel became the President of the Federation of Journalists of Turkey on 27 September 2009, having also been an executive board member and the President of the İzmir Branch of the Turkish Journalists' Association (TGC). During his tenure, he voiced criticism of the ruling Justice and Development Party (AKP) and their alleged suppression of press freedoms in Turkey. He resigned from the Presidency to contest the June 2015 general election.

== Political career ==
=== Social Democratic Populist Party ===
In the 1991 general election, Sertel became a candidate from the Social Democratic Populist Party (SHP) from the electoral district of İzmir. However, due to a 25% election threshold imposed in each district, he was not elected since the SHP won 23.8% of the district vote. However, with 14,820 preference votes, he managed to gain first place on the SHP's provincial candidate list despite initially being listed in second place.

=== Republican People's Party ===
Atilla Sertel resigned as the President of the Turkish Journalists Federation on 20 February 2015 in order to contest the June 2015 general election. He entered the nomination primary elections for İzmir's second electoral district and came third, though the existence of quota candidates chosen exclusively by the party leader meant that he secured sixth place in the lists overall. Following a complaint by anonymous CHP activists, the Supreme Electoral Council of Turkey annulled his candidacy on the grounds that he attended a general assembly meeting of the Press Release Foundation (BİK) after a deadline for candidates to end their affiliations to such establishments. Party leader Kemal Kılıçdaroğlu reacted by vowing to suspend the memberships of the unknown CHP supporters who filed the complaint.

Atilla Sertel was placed in 6th place on the CHP candidate lists in time for the November 2015 snap general election and was elected as a Member of Parliament.

== See also ==
- Censorship in Turkey
