= Selin Sayek Böke =

Turkish politician (born 1972)

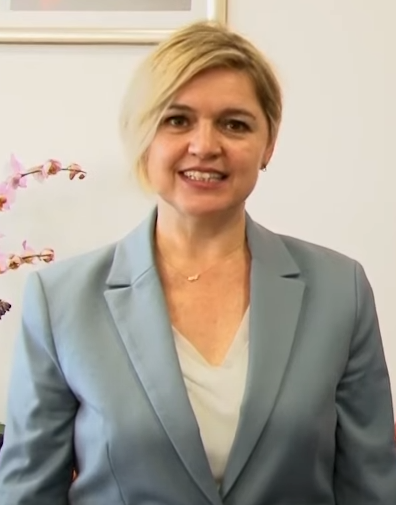
- Selin Sayek Böke in 2020

Vice President of the Socialist International Women
- Incumbent
- Assumed office 21 May 2025
- Leader: Janet Camilo

Secretary-General of the Republican People's Party
- In office 11 November 2023 – 2 June 2026
- Leader: Özgür Özel
- Preceded by: Neslihan Hancıoğlu
- Succeeded by: Rıfat Turuntay Nalbantoğlu
- In office 10 August 2020 – 1 June 2023
- Leader: Kemal Kılıçdaroğlu
- Preceded by: Muharrem Erkek
- Succeeded by: Neslihan Hancıoğlu

Spokesperson of the Republican People's Party
- In office 24 January 2016 – 6 May 2017 (Resignation)
- Leader: Kemal Kılıçdaroğlu
- Preceded by: Haluk Koç
- Succeeded by: Bülent Tezcan

Deputy Leader of the Republican People's Party responsible for economic policy
- In office 14 September 2014 – 6 May 2017
- Leader: Kemal Kılıçdaroğlu
- Preceded by: Faik Öztrak
- Succeeded by: Aykut Erdoğdu

Member of the Grand National Assembly
- In office 23 June 2015 – 14 May 2023
- Constituency: İzmir (I) (June 2015, Nov 2015); İzmir (II) (2018)

Personal details
- Born: Selin Sayek; 24 August 1972 (age 54) Buffalo, New York, United States
- Party: Republican People's Party (2014-2026); New Party (2026-present)
- Spouse: Mert Böke (m. 2002)
- Children: 2
- Parent(s): İskender Sayek; Füsun Sayek
- Education: Middle East Technical University (BA); Duke University (MA, PhD)

Selin Sayek Böke (born 24 August 1972) is a Turkish politician, member of the New Party (YEP), who has served as a Member of Parliament for İzmir from 23 June 2015 to 14 May 2023. She was first elected at the June 2015 general election. She served as the deputy leader of the CHP responsible for economic policies from 14 September 2014 to 6 May 2017. She served as the Secretary-General of the Republican People's Party from 10 August 2020 to 1 June 2023 and 11 November 2023 to 2 June 2026. Born in the United States, she worked in economics, notably as a lecturer and assistant professor at American universities, before moving to Turkey, the country of her parents.

== Early life and career ==
Selin Sayek Böke was born into a Turkish-American family on 24 August 1972 in Buffalo, New York, United States; her father is İskender Sayek and her mother is Füsun Sayek. One part of her family is Antiochian Greek, while another part of her family is Sunni Muslim ethnic Turk from Niğde. She graduated from TED Ankara College in 1989. In 1993, she graduated from Middle East Technical University Faculty of Economics. Between 1993 and 1999, she pursued a master's degree and a doctorate at Duke University in the United States, in the field of economics. She later began teaching at Duke while serving as a project advisor at the World Bank. In her role as an advisor, she worked on World Bank projects in South Africa, north and central Europe. She received her Ph.D from Duke in 1999.

Between 1999 and 2001, she worked at the Bentley University Economics Department as an assistant professor. She later worked at the International Monetary Fund (IMF) office in Washington D.C. as an economist. During her work at the IMF, she also gave lectures at Georgetown University. In 2003, she became a member of teaching staff at Bilkent University. She became an assistant professor in 2010 and became the Chair of the Economics Department at Bilkent University between 2011 and 2014. Between 2013 and 2014, she served as the vice dean of the Bilkent University Faculty of Economic and Administrative Sciences. Since 2011, she is a member of the advisory board at the Scientific and Technological Research Council of Turkey (TÜBİTAK) Social Sciences research Group (SOBAG). She is a founding member of the Füsun Sayek Health and Education Development Foundation.

=== Academic recognition ===
Böke's scientific research has been published in several international and national high-profile journals and books. She received an award from TÜBİTAK in 2010 for her work on international economics and effects of foreign investment. In 2007, she received the Excellence Award in Global Economic Affairs from the Kiel World Economics Institute in Germany. In 2011, she was given an award by the METU Mustafa Parlar Foundation. She has directed several TÜBİTAK research projects.

== Political career ==
In the 18th Republican People's Party Extraordinary Convention held on 6 September 2014, Böke was elected to the Party Council. On 14 September, she was appointed as the Deputy Leader responsible for economic policies. She was elected as a member of parliament for İzmir's first electoral district at the June 2015 and November 2015, second electoral district at the 2018 general election.

== See also ==
- List of Turkish academics
