= Şenol Sunat =

Turkish politician (born 1956)

Şenol Sunat MP
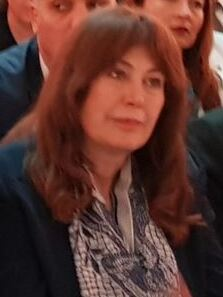

Member of the Grand National Assembly
- Incumbent
- Assumed office 7 July 2018
- Constituency: Ankara (II) (2018); Manisa (2023)
- In office 23 July 2007 – 23 April 2011
- Constituency: İzmir (I) (2007)

Personal details
- Born: 2 October 1956 (age 70) Bursa, Turkey
- Party: Good Party
- Children: 2
- Education: Gazi University
- Occupation: Politician
- Profession: Biologist

Şenol Sunat (formerly Şenol Bal; born 2 October 1956, in Bursa) is a biologist and Turkish politician. She is one of the ten Manisa parliamentarians at the 28th Parliament of Turkey and a founding member of the Turkey political party, the Good Party (Turkish: İYİ Parti). She is also a member of general administrative board and Head of election affairs of the Party.

== Education ==
She did her primary school education in Adıyaman and completed her secondary education in İzmir. She then furthered to higher education at Ege University, Faculty of Science, Botany-Chemistry Department and İzmir Higher Teacher School. She graduated from Gazi Education Faculty, Biology Department, Gazi University and Anadolu University Business Administration Department. She obtained her master's and doctorate degrees on Cytogenetics (Cell genetics) at Gazi University, Institute of Science and Technology.

== Career ==
She began her work life as a teacher for two years, she also worked as an administrator in the private sector for seven years. She then returned and worked as a faculty staff (Assist. Prof. Dr.) at Gazi University, Gazi Education Faculty, Department of Biology and Science between 1989 and 2007. Sunat served as the general president of Ülkücü Ladies' Association in İzmir (an organization she pioneered its formation and establishment in 1976) between 1997 and 2001.

She was elected as one of İzmir 1st constituency Deputies in 2007 as a Nationalist Movement Party candidate and served in the 23rd Parliament of Turkey. She was not reelected into the 24th, 25th and 26th Grand National Assembly of Turkey after her first term ended in 2011. She served as a member of the MHP VQA between 2012 and 2015.

In 2017, She joined a Meral Akşener-led exodus of prominent members from the Nationalist Movement Party to form a new political party; the Good Party.

Sunat was elected to the 27th Parliament of Turkey in 2018 as a Good Party candidate for Ankara (2nd electoral district) in 2018. She was reelected as one of the ten Manisa (electoral district) deputies on the same platform of the Good Party during 2023 Turkish general election and continues to be a member of the Grand National Assembly of Turkey. She is a member of the Good Party's general administrative board and the Chairperson of the IYI Party Election Affairs. She is also a member of the National Education, Culture, Youth and Sports Commission and the Commission for Gender Equality and Equity of the Turkish Parliament.

== Family ==
She was married to the former leader of the Ülkü Ocakları until 2012. She is a mother of 2 children and a sister to the murdered Turkish actor İsmail Hakkı Sunat. She speaks English.
