= Tacettin Bayır =

Turkish politician (born 1960)

Tacettin Bayır MP

Member of the Grand National Assembly
- Incumbent
- Assumed office 7 June 2015
- Constituency: İzmir (I) (June 2015, Nov 2015, 2018)

Provincial President of the Republican People's Party İzmir Branch
- In office 17 January 2011 – 3 June 2012
- Leader: Kemal Kılıçdaroğlu
- Preceded by: Rıfat Nalbantoğlu
- Succeeded by: Ali Engin

Personal details
- Born: January 1, 1960 (age 66) Karaburun, İzmir, Turkey
- Party: Republican People's Party (CHP) (2011–2018); Good Party (2018-present)
- Website: tacettinbayir.com

Tacettin Bayır (born 1 January 1960) is a Turkish politician from the Republican People's Party (CHP) who currently serves as a Member of Parliament for İzmir's first electoral district since 7 June 2015, first elected in the June 2015 general election. He was formerly a founding member of the now-defunct Social Democracy Party (SODEP) in the early 1980s and later joined the Social Democratic Populist Party (SHP) before the party merged with the CHP.

== Early life and career ==
Tacettin Bayır was born in a village named Mordoğan, in İzmir's Karaburun district, in 1960. After completing his primary and secondary education, he established a workshop in 1978 and worked there in the morning while continuing his high school education at the Akşam School of Commerce. He has since been a delegate for two terms at the İzmir Chamber of Commerce. He also served as the leader of the Executive Board of a construction company. He is married with two children.

== Political career ==
=== SODEP and the SHP ===
In 1983, Bayır became one of the founding members of the Social Democracy Party (SODEP). After the party merged with the People's Party (HP) and became the Social Democratic Populist Party (SHP), he served as the President of the SHP's Artisan Commission in İzmir's Konak district. Between 1988 and 1990, he served as the President of Konak's community centres (Halkevleri) and was also the President of the Halkevleri Provincial Co-ordination Board. He was elected as a party delegate on both a district and provincial level while the SHP began merging preparations with the Republican People's Party (CHP).

=== Republican People's Party ===
Bayır served as the Provincial President of the Republican People's Party İzmir Branch, the latest between 17 January 2011 and 3 June 2012. He also served as a member of the party's Consultation Board and election propagandist. In the party nomination primaries held before the 1999 general election, Bayır came seventh out of 43 candidates and thus made it onto the party candidate lists, though the CHP fell below the 10% election threshold and lost all parliamentary representation in 1999.

=== Member of Parliament ===
Bayır was elected as a CHP Member of Parliament for İzmir's first electoral district at the June 2015 general election. Shortly after he took his seat, he announced that he would be using his MP wages to provide a ₺300 scholarship to 50 students every month. His wife announced that they had formed a commission to determine the 50 successful applicants every month. After an escalation of conflict between the Turkish Army and the Kurdistan Workers' Party (PKK) in September 2015, he proposed a law that would declare 6 September as a national day of remembrance for fallen soldiers.

Bayır was one of 15 CHP deputies to join the Good Party on 21 April 2018.

== See also ==
- 25th Parliament of Turkey
