= Leuna works =

Chemical industrial complex in Germany

The Leuna works (German: Leunawerke) in Leuna, Saxony-Anhalt, is one of the biggest chemical industrial complexes in Germany. The site, now owned jointly by companies such as TotalEnergies, BASF, Linde plc, and DOMO Group, covers 13 km^{2} and produces a very wide range of chemicals and plastics.

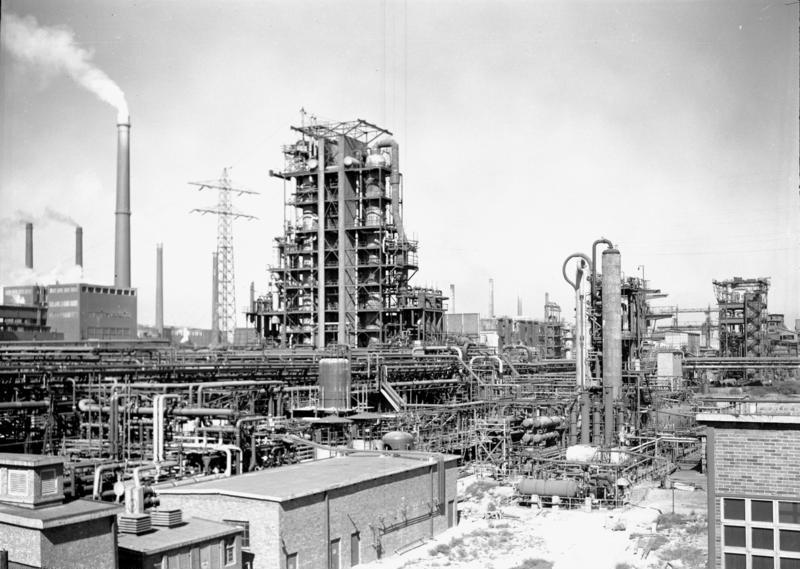
Leuna-Werke, Destillationsanlagen

== Origins ==
Ammonia is an important intermediate product for the manufacture of nitric acid and other nitrogen compounds, needed to produce fertilizers and explosives in particular. The increasing demand for explosives during World War I exceeded the ammonia production capacities of the Oppau works of BASF, who owned the patents for the Haber process. Leuna in central Germany, out of range of French aircraft, was selected as the location of a second plant named Badische Anilin- und Sodafabrik, Ammoniakwerk Merseburg. Construction started on 25 May 1916, and the first tank car with ammonia left the works in April 1917.

In 1920, the ammonia works of Leuna and Oppau merged into Ammoniakwerke Merseburg-Oppau GmbH.

The proximity of the site to lignite (brown coal) mines was also advantageous for the production of syngas (hydrogen and carbon monoxide) and tests of coal conversion into liquid fuels on an industrial scale. The Leuna plant for the commercial hydrogenation of lignite started production on April 1, 1927.

In late 1925, BASF became a branch of IG Farben, operating as Ammoniakwerk Merseburg GmbH – Leuna Werke. The site was rapidly expanded in the 1920s and 1930s, with plants producing methanol, synthetic petrol derived from the hydrogenation of lignite, amines and detergents. The synthesis of petrol, although expensive compared to world market prices, was pursued in order to reduce Germany's dependency on imported oil products. As Germany possesses very few petroleum deposits of its own, seven hydrogenation plants were constructed and were producing synthetic petrol by 1939, Leuna being the largest.

Construction of the Buna Werke Schkopau synthetic rubber plant, then a subsidiary of Leuna ammonia works, started in 1936.

== Strike in March 1921 ==
Following the Kapp Putsch the Leuna works were a centre of organising by the Communist Workers' Party of Germany (KAPD) and the associated workplace organisation the General Workers' Union of Germany (AAUD) to which half of the 20,000 workforce belonged. Peter Utzelmann co-ordinated the strike committee during the March Action in March 1921.

== World War II ==
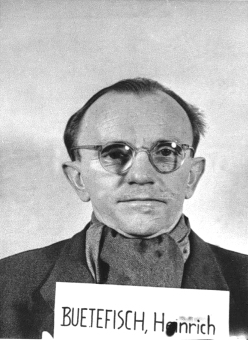
Heinrich Bütefisch, head of operations at Leuna works

As one of the largest synthetic oil plants and second most extensive chemical operation in Nazi Germany, the IG Farben Leuna works headed by Heinrich Bütefisch was a prime target for the Allied bombing offensive against German oil production. Leuna had been the first plant to test the Bergius process, which synthesized oil products from lignite, but switched to brown coal tar in 1944, due to air raid damages. Leuna covered 3 square miles (7.8 km^{2}) of land with 250 buildings, including decoy buildings outside the main plant, and employed 35,000 workers, including 10,000 prisoners and forced labourers. The 14th Flak Division responsible for protecting Leuna had 28,000 troops, 18,000 RAD personnel, 6,000 male and 3,050 female auxiliaries, 900 Hungarian and Italian 'volunteers', 3,600 Russian Hiwis, and 3,000 others, thus making up a total of 62,550 persons. More than 19,000 of Leuna's workers were members of the air raid protection organization which operated over 600 radar-directed guns, while the fire-fighting force consisted of 5,000 men and women.

A total of 6,552 bomber sorties over 20 US Eighth Air Force and 2 RAF attacks dropped 18,328 tons of bombs on Leuna. As the most heavily defended industrial target in Europe, Leuna would become so dark from flak, German smoke pots, and exploding oil tanks that "we had no idea how close our bombs came to the target.". On clear days, only 29% of the bombs aimed at Leuna landed inside the plant gates; on radar raids the number dropped to 5.1%. During the first raid of the Oil Plan, 126 Leuna workers were killed. However, after defenses were increased, only 175 additional workers were killed in 21 subsequent raids. Leuna bombing from May 12, 1944 to April 5, 1945, cost the Eighth Air Force 1,280 airmen. In three separate attacks by the Eighth, 119 planes were lost and not one bomb fell on the Leuna works. The Eighth Air Force also dropped 12,953 tons of explosives on nearby Merseburg.

The successful aerial attacks contributed vitally to the defeat of Germany in World War II, since they deprived the country and its troops of essential commodities. On 4 April 1945, production in Leuna stopped entirely.

== 1945 to 1990 ==

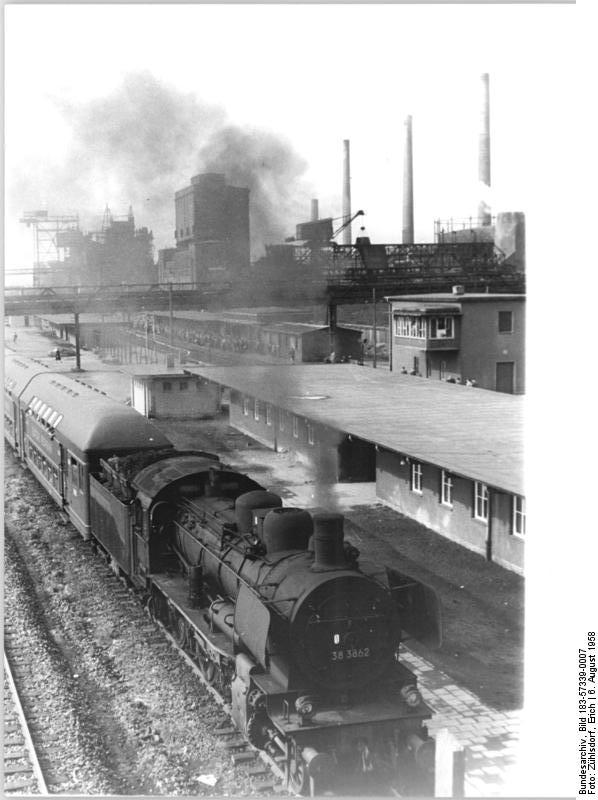
One of the railway stations serving Leunawerke

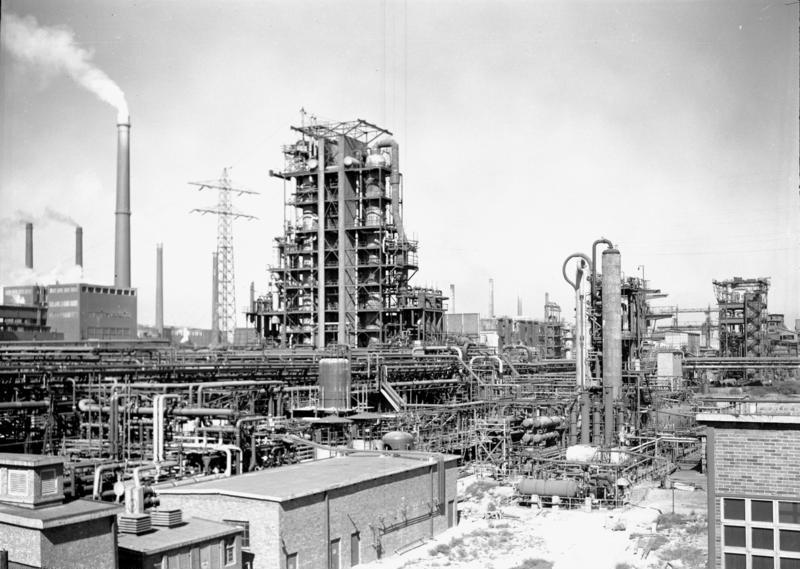
Distillation plant for the production of motor fuels (1959)

After partial destruction in World War II and the dissolution of IG Farben, the works were transferred into a Soviet holding. About half of the remaining production plants were dismantled and shipped to the Soviet Union as war reparations. In the following years, the Leuna site was gradually rebuilt and expanded. In 1954 the works were transferred into public property and became known as "VEB Leuna-Werke Walter Ulbricht", the largest chemical production site in the German Democratic Republic. Next to the existing plant, the construction of Leuna II started in 1959. This was a modern petrochemical plant, with equipment such as a cracking plant for the production of ethylene and propene and the subsequent processing facilities for the production of phenol, caprolactam, and HDPE partly being supplied domestically, partly being imported from the Federal Republic of Germany, the Soviet Union, and the United Kingdom. In the 1950s an oil refinery was built, which processed crude oil supplied from the Soviet Union via a branch of the Druzhba pipeline. The latter also had a branch to Rostock port allowing the import of oil of other origin by sea.

Following the oil price hikes of 1973/1974, and of 1979/1980, and the reduced supply from the Soviet Union, substantial investments were made in the oil processing industry. New, more sophisticated cracking plants were imported from the Federal Republic of Germany, from Japan, Austria, and Sweden, and were operated with modern distributed control systems originating in the FRG and the United States. Thereby, the fraction of so-called "black products" such as bitumen and heavy fuel oil was reduced to almost zero in favour of the "white products" such as gasoline, diesel fuel, and light heating oil. Motor fuels produced in Leuna II were also exported outside the socialist bloc to bankroll the new plants and to earn hard currency. For instance, Leuna gasoline was sold in West Berlin. Even the heaviest residues from oil processing were used as raw material for the production of syngas in the new low-pressure methanol plant. This hydrogenation-based technology required a large amount of hydrogen and was not profitable.

Leunawerke employed about 30,000 people, the fenced-in complex extended over an area about 7 km long and 3 km wide. Two railway stations on the Halle–Bebra railway and several stops of Halle tramway line 5 served the works.

Wear and tear of the up to 70 years old plants, in particular those for the production of syngas and ammonia and the high-pressure methanol plant, increased considerably until the 1980s, so that the high expenditures for energy, upkeep, and manpower made their economic operation impossible. To counter the shortage of manpower, construction soldiers were also employed.

== Since 1990 ==
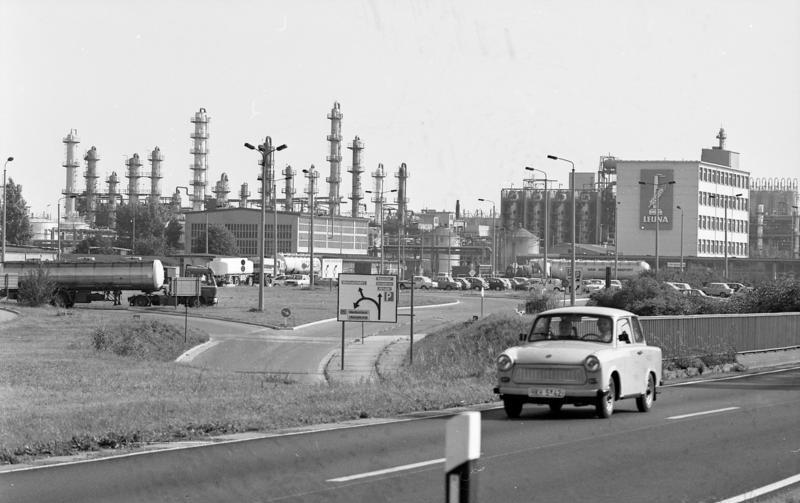
Leuna-Werke in 1991

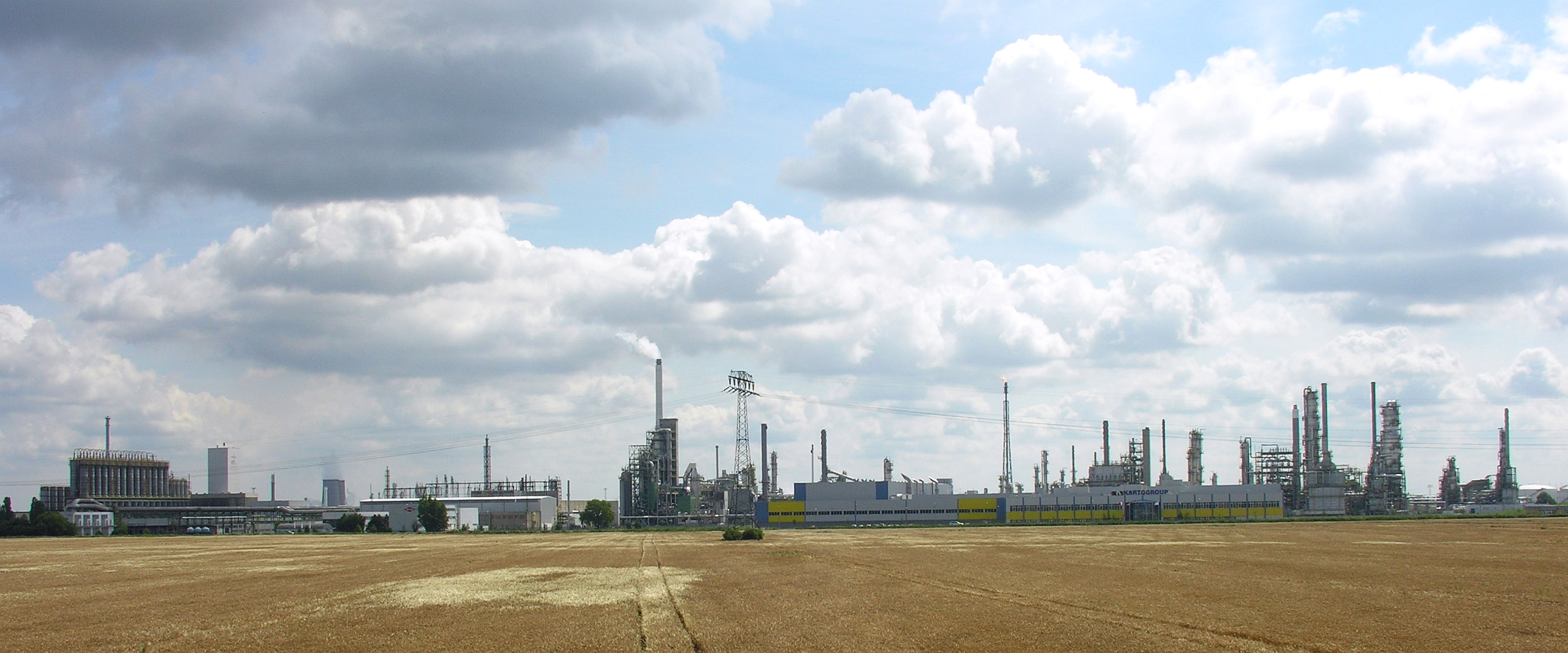
Chemical and Industrial Plant Leuna in 2007

After German reunification in 1990, the Leuna works were divided into several smaller units that were sold to several companies, among them Total S.A., BASF, Linde AG, and Belgian DOMO Group. Common utilities for the companies are provided by InfraLeuna. With the closure of unprofitable plants and general modernization, the number of employees was reduced significantly from 28000 (1978) to 9000 in 2014. QUINN Chemicals invested in a plant to manufacture methyl methacrylate (MMA) but construction has halted as of January 2009 due to heavy cost overruns.

Chancellor Helmut Kohl mediated the transfer of the Leuna oil refinery to French company Elf Aquitaine (who later became part of Total) in 1990/1991. Dubious transactions at that time led to the so-called Leuna affair and criminal proceedings against manager Alfred Sirven. In 1997, the new refinery MIDER (Mitteldeutsche Erdoel-Raffinerie), now TRM (TotalEnergies Raffinerie Mitteldeutschland) started production after two and a half years of construction time. It represents the largest direct investment of a French company in the new states of Germany and was supported by an EU state aid of 1400 million Deutsche Mark, corresponding to 27% of the total investment. With the construction of new plants in an area named Leuna III, the industrial complex has expanded towards the village of Spergau.
