= Buna Werke =

Buna Werke may refer to:

- Buna Werke Schkopau, the first large-scale synthetic rubber plant in Schkopau, Germany
- Monowitz Buna Werke, a former synthetic rubber plant with attached forced labour camp near Oświęcim, Poland
