= Oktay Vural =

Turkish politician

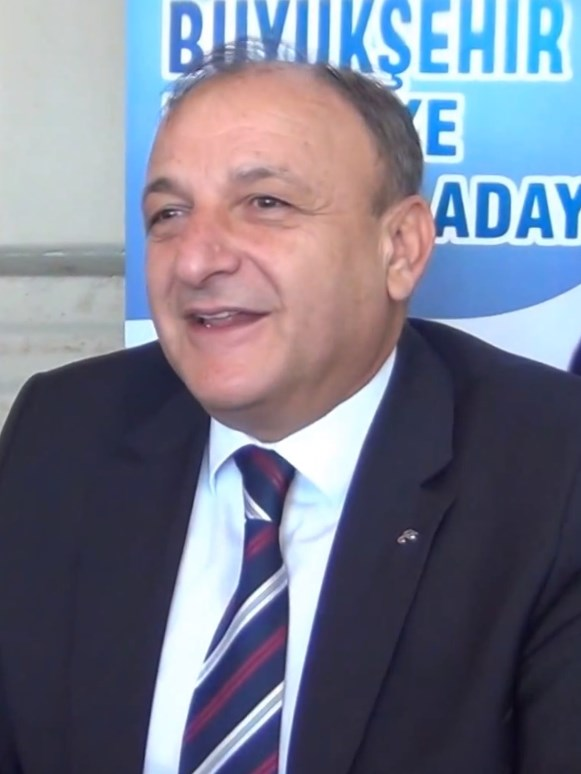

Deputy Parliamentary Group Leader of the Nationalist Movement Party
- In office 23 July 2007 – 22 June 2016
- Leader: Devlet Bahçeli
- Preceded by: Position established
- Succeeded by: Erhan Usta

Minister of Transport
- In office 30 July 2001 – 5 August 2002
- Prime Minister: Bülent Ecevit
- Preceded by: Enis Öksüz
- Succeeded by: Naci Kınacıoğlu

Member of the Grand National Assembly
- In office 23 July 2007 – 16 May 2018
- Constituency: İzmir (I) (2007, 2011, June 2015, Nov 2015)
- In office 2 May 1999 – 1 October 2002
- Constituency: İzmir (I) (1999)

Personal details
- Born: 9 February 1956 (age 70) Diyarbakır, Turkey
- Party: Good Party (2023–)
- Other political affiliations: Nationalist Movement Party (until 2023)
- Spouse(s): Tuba Vural (m. 1988–2014, her death)
- Children: Oğuz; Yavuz
- Education: Dokuz Eylül University
- Website: Official site

Oktay Vural (born 9 February 1956) is a Turkish politician, lawyer and former bureaucrat.

Oktay Vural was born on 9 February 1956, in Diyarbakır as the child of Hasan and Harbiye Vural. After completing his primary and secondary education in Diyarbakır, he graduated from Istanbul University Faculty of Law in 1979 . In 1983, he received his Master's Degree from Ege University , Faculty of Economics, Department of Finance, and in 1987, his PhD in economics from Dokuz Eylul University, Institute of Social Sciences.

In 1988, he became an assistant professor at Dokuz Eylül University, Faculty of Economics and Administrative Sciences. BOTAŞ Pipelines and Petrol Transport Inc. chairman of the board of directors and general manager, member of the Presidency State Audit Board, Türkiye Gübre Sanayi A.Ş. Chairman of the Board of Directors and General Directorate, Unity in Democracy Foundation Membership, NATO Parliamentary Assembly Membership, XXI., XXIII., XXIV and XXV. He served as the İzmir Deputy for the term, as the chairman of the Parliamentary Industry, Trade, Energy, Natural Resources, Information and Technology Commission, and as the Minister of Transport. He served as the Deputy Chairman of the Nationalist Movement Party (MHP) Group in the 23rd and 24th term in the Grand National Assembly of Turkey. He resigned from his position on 22 June 2016 On June 24, 2023, he joined the party at the IYI Party's Ordinary Assembly and joined the General Administrative Board.

Galatasarayis a congress member. He had two children named Oğuz and Yavuz from his marriage to Tuba Vural.
