= Peter Utzelmann =

- Born: Franz Peter Utzelmann; May 1, 1896
- Died: 1972 (aged 75–76)
- Occupation: Communist activist
- Organization: Communist Workers' Party of Germany (KAPD)
- Known for: Founding member of KAPD, coordinator of the Leuna works strike committee
- Political party: Communist Workers' Party of Germany (KAPD)
- Movement: Communist movement

(Franz) Peter Utzelmann (1 May 1896 – 1972) was a German communist. He was a founding member of the Communist Workers' Party of Germany (KAPD). He was the coordinator of the strike committee at the Leuna works. Over 25,000 workers at the plant went on strike during the March Action in 1921.
