= Füsun Sayek =

Turkish physician (1947-2006)

Dr. med. Füsun Sayek
- Born: August 11, 1947; Bor, Niğde, Turkey
- Died: October 15, 2006 (aged 59); Ankara, Turkey
- Resting place: İskenderun, Hatay, Turkey
- Education: Medicine (Ophthalmology)
- Alma mater: Hacettepe University
- Spouse: İskender Sayek
- Children: Selin Sayek Böke, Aylin Sayek Beyazıt

Füsun Sayek (August 11, 1947 – October 15, 2006) was a Turkish female ophthalmologist and chairperson of the Turkish Medical Association.

Füsun Sayek was born in Bor, Niğde on August 11, 1947, where her father was serving. She completed her primary education in Bor and the middle school in Diyarbakır. In 1964, she finished high school in Ankara. She studied medicine at Hacettepe University, and graduated in 1970. The career education, which she began at her alma mater in 1971, she continued in the State of New York, in the United States until 1976. In 1981 she became a specialist in ophthalmology. She obtained a certificate for community eye healthcare in England in 1986.

Sayek served as a board member in Ankara Medical Association between 1984 and 1986, as a member of the Central Committee of the Turkish Medical Association (Turkish: Türk Tabipler birliği) (TTB) from 1990 to 1994. In 1996, she was elected chairperson of the TBB's central committee. She served at this post until her death in 2006.

Sayek was diagnosed with breast cancer, however, she neglected treating the disease, which resulted in its advancement. She died in Ankara on 15 October 2006. She was buried at her spouse's hometown in İskenderun.

In her honor, Ankara Medical Association holds annually "Dr. Füsun Sayek Medical Education Meeting" (Turkish: Dr. Füsun Sayek Tıp Eğitimi Buluşması) on the National Doctors' Day. The "Füsun Sayek Healthcare and Education Development Association" (Turkish: Füsun Sayek Sağlık ve Eğitim Geliştirme Derneği) organizes diverse events in the "Sayek House" at Arsuz, Hatay every year in summer.
