= Federation of Journalists of Turkey =

- Founded: 1996
- Founder: İsmail Sivri
- Purpose: Journalism, press freedom
- Location: Turkey
- Key people: Yılmaz Karaca, President
- Website: http://www.tgf.com.tr

The Federation of Journalists of Turkey (Turkish: Türkiye Gazeteciler Federasyonu, TGF) is a journalists association in Turkey founded on 18 March 1996. It was formed out of several local associations and unions that were formed by journalists in provinces such as İzmir and Muğla. Its current President is Yılmaz Karaca.

== Former presidents ==
The list of former presidents of the Federation are listed below.

1. İsmail Sivri (1997–1998)
2. Nazmi Bilgin (1998–2009)
3. Atilla Sertel (2009–2015)
4. Yılmaz Karaca (since 2015)

== See also ==
- Turkish Journalists' Association
