= Turkish Medical Association =

- Türk Tabipleri Birliği
- Formation: 1953
- Headquarters: Ankara, Turkey
- Members: 110,000 (2020)
- Chairman: Prof. Dr. Alpay Azap
- Website: www.ttb.org.tr

The Turkish Medical Association (Turkish: Türk Tabipleri Birliği, abbreviated as TTB) is the professional association and registered trade union for doctors in Turkey. Its membership of 110,000 as of the year 2020, covers 80% of Turkey's doctors. It is affiliated to the World Medical Association.

Membership is compulsory for self-employed doctors, but not for those employed by the government. Its main source of income is membership fees, which are regulated by the Ministry of Health, but it does not receive any support from the government.

In 2012, the Turkish government created a new organization, the "Board for Health Professions", giving it many of the responsibilities the TTB previously had, including maintaining and enforcing ethics codes. The TTB was entitled to appoint one of the board's 15 members, with the rest appointed by the government.

On January 30, 2018, several senior members, including the TTB's chairman, Raşit Tükel, were arrested after criticizing the Turkish military operation in Afrin.

== Chairman ==
Alpay Azap

- 2024- Prof. Dr. Alpay Azap
- 2020–2024 day: Prof. Dr. Şebnem Korur Fincancı
- 2018–2020: Prof. Dr. Sinan Adıyaman
- 2016–2018: Prof. Dr. Raşit Tükel
- 2014–2016: Dr. Bayazıt İlhan
- 2012–2014: Prof. Dr. Ahmet Özdemir Aktan
- 2010–2012: Dr. Eriş Bilaloğlu
- 2006–2010: Prof. Dr. Gençay Gürsoy
- 1996–2006: Dr. Füsun Sayek
- 1990–1996: Dr. Selim Ölçer
- 1984–1990: Prof. Dr. Nusret Fişek

== See also ==
- Health care in Turkey
