= Naci Kınacıoğlu =

Turkish politician

Minister of Transport
- In office 5 August 2002 – 18 November 2002
- Prime Minister: Bülent Ecevit
- Preceded by: Oktay Vural
- Succeeded by: Binali Yıldırım

Personal details
- Born: 1929 Kayseri, Turkey
- Died: 20 June 2009 (aged 80) Ankara, Turkey
- Party: Independent
- Education: Ankara University, Law School; Freiburg University

Naci Kınacıoğlu (1929 – 20 June 2009) was a Turkish academic and interim Minister of Transport between 5 August and 18 November 2002. He entered office as an Independent politician three months before the general election of 2002 as required by the Turkish Constitution.

== Early life and career ==
=== Education ===
Naci Kınacıoğlu was born in Kayseri in 1929 and graduated from Ankara University Faculty of Law in 1953. In 1954, he worked on a doctorate from the Freiburg University in Germany, specialising in copyright law. He submitted his doctorate in 1958 to the Ankara Economic and Commercial Sciences Academy. He became a docent in 1962 and a professor in 1969.

=== Academic career ===
In 1976, he became a member of the Council of Europe Sub-Commission on Local Government. Between 1982 and 1988, he worked as an assistant rector at Gazi University. At Gazi, he also worked as the Director of the Business Department at the School of Economics and Administrative Sciences, Director of the Institute of Social Sciences, President of the Publications Committee, Head of the Circulating Capital Enterprise Presidency and General Co-ordinator of obligatory course studies.

Between 1988 and 1992, he served as the rector of Erciyas University. Later, he returned to Gazi University Faculty of Law to become President of the Department of Private Law Department and Head of Legal Department. He retired in 1998. Between 1999 and 2002, he was the President of the Owners of Science and Literature Works Careers Association (İLESAM). He has authored several works and articles on commercial law and intellectual property rights.

== Minister of Transport ==
In accordance with Article 114 of the Constitution of Turkey, the positions of Minister of Justice, Minister of the Interior and Ministry Minister of Transport are delegated to non-partisan Independents three months before a general election to reduce any unfair electoral advantage of the incumbent government. As a result, Kınacıoğlu was appointed as the Minister of Transport, succeeding Oktay Vural on 5 August 2002. He served until a new government was formed following the 2002 general election.

== See also ==
- 57th government of Turkey
