= DOMO Group =

Textile and chemical company

DOMO Investment Group is a Belgian holding group. The holding consist of 3 parts, DOVESCO, DOMO Chemicals & Alinso Group. The company's head office is located in Zwijnaarde near Ghent. In 2006 the company had a turnover of 993 million euro and employed 2007 people; in 2022 this had increased to a 2.47 billion euro. Since 1994, DOMO operates caprolactam and polyamide granulate and fibre plants in Leuna, Germany.

== History ==
The company was founded in 1992 from the carpet manufacturing companies Eurantex, DOMO and Fabelta. DOMO itself was founded in 1991 as one of companies which were created out of Beaulieu.
