= Mustafa Balbay =

Turkish politician and journalist

Mustafa Ali Balbay MP
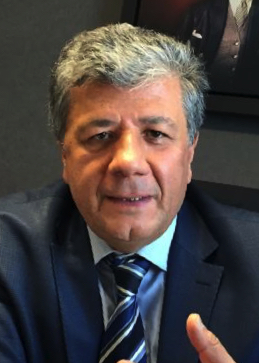

Member of the Grand National Assembly
- Incumbent
- Assumed office 12 June 2011
- Constituency: İzmir (II) (2011, June 2015, Nov 2015)

Personal details
- Born: August 8, 1960 (age 66) Burdur, Turkey
- Citizenship: Turkey
- Party: Republican People's Party (CHP)
- Education: Ege Üniversitesi İletişim Fakültesi
- Occupation: Journalist, Writer, Turkish MP
- Awards: Sertel Demokrasi Ödülü, 2004
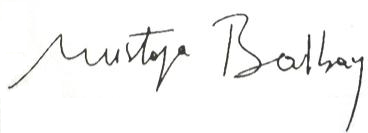
- Signature

Mustafa Ali Balbay (born August 8, 1960) is a journalist, writer and former Turkish MP. As the main political correspondent in Ankara for the left-wing Kemalist daily newspaper Cumhuriyet, he wrote a regular column called Gözlem which he took over from the prominent investigative journalist Ugur Mumcu, who was assassinated in 1993. Balbay was arrested on March 5, 2009 as an Ergenekon suspect in the Odatv case, and in August 2009 he was sentenced to 34 years and eight months.

== Journalistic career ==
Mustafa Balbay began his journalistic career in 1980 as a student reporter for a local newspaper called Gazete İzmir. The following year, he was hired by the centre-left daily Milliyet for their İzmir office and later moved to Cumhuriyet's office in İzmir as a permanent correspondent. In 1985, he became the chief investigating reporter in İzmir for the same newspaper. In 1989, he moved to their headquarters in Ankara to work as the news director. In 1992, Balbay was appointed Cumhuriyet news director in Istanbul. In 1993, he was appointed as the main political correspondent in Ankara for the left-wing Kemalist daily newspaper Cumhuriyet. Later, he gave some lectures for the Faculty of Journalism of Gazi University. Additionally, in 2009 he had a political talk show called Ankara Rüzgari (Winds from Ankara), co-chaired by the journalist Emin Çölaşan, on Avrasya TV (ART). After his arrest, he continued writing his regular column for Cumhuriyet.

== Ergenekon case ==
Mustafa Balbay is detained as part of the government's investigation into the alleged Ergenekon plot, that authorities claim was aimed at overthrowing the current Turkish government through a military coup. He was initially detained on July 1, 2008, brought to Istanbul, and questioned about his news coverage and his relations with the military and other Ergenekon suspects. Police searched his house and the Ankara office of Cumhuriyet, confiscating computers and documents. He was released four days later. However, Balbay was detained a second time in March 2009 and placed at Silivri F Type Prison in Istanbul pending trial. He was moved to solitary confinement on February 28, 2011. His first trial appearance took place after nine months in detention. On February 25, 2011, the president of the Court, Köksal Şengün, officially opposed his detention, however, the court decided to keep him in detention with majority votes. From October 2012, he shared a cell with the arrested journalist Tuncay Özkan.

=== Legal charges ===
- being a member of an armed terrorist organization
- attempting to overthrow the government
- provoking an armed uprising
- unlawfully obtaining, using, and destroying documents concerning government security
- disseminating classified information.

The evidence against Balbay consisted of documents seized from his property and office, the news stories he produced, wiretapped telephone conversations, and secretly recorded meetings with senior military and government officials. In its indictment, the government claimed that Balbay kept detailed records of his meetings with military and political figures with the intention of provoking a coup against the ruling AKP government.

=== Defense position ===
Mustafa Balbay has denied the government’s accusations. In columns written from prison and in court hearings, he has repeatedly said that the seized notes and recorded conversations related to his journalistic activities. Regarding the taped conversations, he said that such discussions were theoretical and constituted no criminal intent. Moreover, he added that notes shown as evidence and allegedly written by him have three different versions in the indictment. He also rejected claims that he has relations within the alleged Ergenekon organization. In a letter he sent to a delegation composed of Gazetecilere Özgürlük Platformu (Freedom for Journalists Platform), RSF, IFJ, EFJ and IPI he said, "if you try to produce a crime from an archive belonging to a journalist, you can declare everyone as guilty".

On August 5, 2009 Balbay was sentenced to 34 years and eight months in prison. Balbay was released after four years and 277 days of imprisonment in the Sincan Prison in Ankara on December 9, 2013. The Constitutional Court declared his lengthy imprisonment a violation of the law and of his rights as an elected Member of Parliament.

== Political career ==
Despite being imprisoned, Mustafa Balbay was elected a parliamentary deputy on the Republican People's Party (CHP) ticket in İzmir Province in the June 2011 election. On December 10, 2013, he took the oath of office, which is compulsory for deputies before they can begin their duties in the parliament.

== Bibliography ==
- Dönekrasi. Ümit Yayınları. 1996. p. 206.
- Türban Kime Kurban. Istanbul: Çınar Yayınları. 1997. p. 159. ISBN 975-348 1136.
- Ülkelere Değil Savaşa Düşmanım (3rd ed.). Istanbul: Cumhuriyet Kitapları. 2009. p. 284. ISBN 978 975-6747 773.
- Copokrasi. Ümit Yayıncılık. 1997. p. 174.
- Cepokrasi. Ankara: Ümit Yayıncılık. 1998. p. 173. ISBN 978 975-711 5540.
- Balkanlar (6th ed.). Istanbul: Cumhuriyet Kitapları. 2009. p. 356. ISBN 978 975-7720 256.
- Orta(daki) Asya Ülkeleri. Istanbul: Cumhuriyet Kitapları. 1999. p. 336. ISBN 978 975-7720 706.
- Yemen Türkler Mezarlığı (5th ed.). Istanbul: Cumhuriyet Kitapları. 2000. p. 204. ISBN 978 975-6747 094.
- Affedersin La Fontaine (5th ed.). Istanbul: Cumhuriyet Kitapları. 2009. p. 286. ISBN 978 975-6747 742.
- Yürüt Ya Kulum / Demireller Tarihinde II. Yahya Vak'ası. Ümit Yayıncılık. 2001. p. 256. ISBN 975-8572 059.
- Güvercin, Kurt, Bir de Arı Ele Geçirince İktidarı... Ankara: Bilgi Yayınevi. 2002. p. 222. ISBN 978 975-4949 971.
- Çin'in Uzun Yürüyüşü. Istanbul: Cumhuriyet Kitapları. 2002. p. 232. ISBN 978 975-6747 438.
- Afrika'nın Uçlarında (3rd ed.). Istanbul: Cumhuriyet Kitapları. 2009. p. 288. ISBN 978 975-6747 506.
- Tarihin Arka Odası: Amerika (2nd ed.). Istanbul: Cumhuriyet Kitapları. 2009. p. 312. ISBN 978 975-6747 834.
- İran Raporu (4th ed.). Istanbul: Cumhuriyet Kitapları. 2008. p. 344. ISBN 978 975-6747 889.
- Suriye Raporu (2nd ed.). Istanbul: Cumhuriyet Kitapları. 2006. p. 288. ISBN 978 975-6747 995.
- Irak Bataklığında Türk-Amerikan İlişkileri (5th ed.). Istanbul: Cumhuriyet Kitapları. 2007. p. 456. ISBN 978 975-6747 667.
- Devlet ve İslam (4th ed.). Istanbul: Cumhuriyet Kitapları. 2009. p. 240. ISBN 978 994-4150 033.
- Heyecan Yaşlanmaz (4th ed.). Istanbul: Cumhuriyet Kitapları. 2009. p. 232. ISBN 978 994-4150 330.
- Anzak Türkleri (Çanakkale'den Avustralya'ya) (2nd ed.). Istanbul: Cumhuriyet Kitapları. 2009. p. 262. ISBN 978 994-4150 569.
- 78'liler: 12 Eylül Sol- Kırımı. Istanbul: Cumhuriyet Kitapları. 2012. p. 256. ISBN 978 994-4150 880.
- Nasreddin Hoca ile Eşeği (2nd ed.). Istanbul: Cumhuriyet Kitapları. 2009. p. 96. ISBN 978-6054 183 180.
- Nasreddin Hoca ile Çocuklar. Istanbul: Cumhuriyet Kitapları. 2009. p. 96. ISBN 978-6054 183 296.
- Silivri Toplama Kampı Zulümhane (37th ed.). Istanbul: Cumhuriyet Kitapları. 2011. p. 335. ISBN 978-6055 525 347.
- Düşünüyorum Öyleyse Sanığım Zulümname (10th ed.). Istanbul: Cumhuriyet Kitapları. 2011. p. 352. ISBN 978-6055 525 484.
- Zulümdar (Demokrasi Tanrısı). Istanbul: Cumhuriyet Kitapları. 2011. p. 240. ISBN 978-6055 525 606.
- Gülümsemek Direnmektir. Istanbul: Cumhuriyet Kitapları. 2012. p. 320. ISBN 978-6051 400 112.
- Denizlerin Davası. Istanbul: Cumhuriyet Kitapları. 2012. p. 132. ISBN 978-6051 400 167.
- O Mektubu Yazan Bendim. Istanbul: Cumhuriyet Kitapları. 2012. p. 362. ISBN 978-6051 400 228.
- Geçmişten Geleceğe TÜRKİYE. Istanbul: Cumhuriyet Kitapları. 2014. p. 221. ISBN 978-6051 400 440.
