= İzmir (1st electoral district) =

Electoral district for the Grand National Assembly of Turkey

İzmir (I)
- electoral district for the Grand National Assembly of Turkey
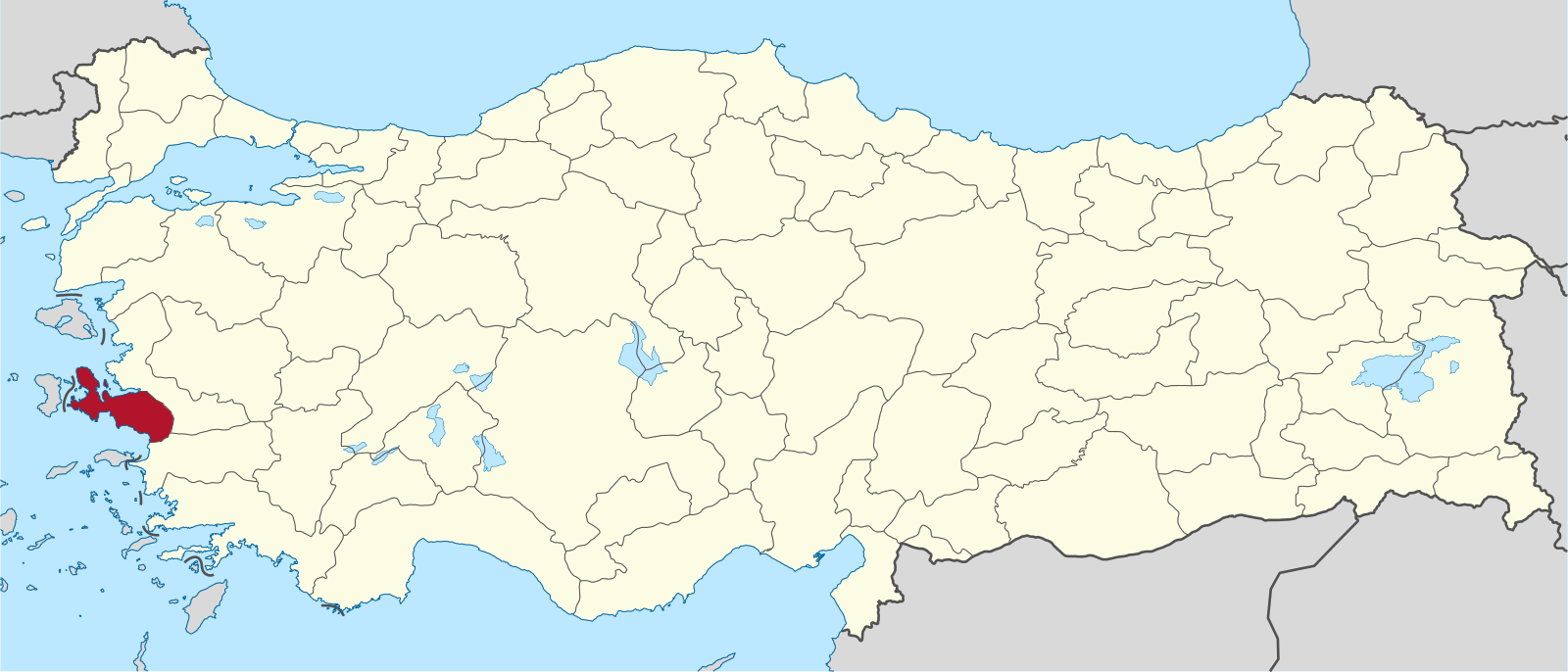
- İzmir (I) shown within Turkey
- Province: İzmir
- Electorate: 1,428,414

Current electoral district
- Created: 1923
- Seats: 13
- MPs: List: Güldal Mumcu CHP Rıza Mahmut Türmen CHP Oğuz Oyan CHP Musa Çam CHP Erdal Aksünger CHP Hülya Güven CHP Ertuğrul Günay AKP Mehmet Sayım Tekelioğlu AKP İlhan İşbilen AKP İlknur Denizli AKP İlknur Denizli AKP Rıfat Sait AKP Oktay Vural MHP
- Parent district: İzmir
- Turnout at last election: 87.39%
- Representation
- CHP: 7 / 13
- AK Party: 4 / 13
- MHP: 1 / 13
- HDP: 1 / 13

İzmir's first electoral district is one of two divisions of İzmir province for the purpose of elections to Grand National Assembly of Turkey. It elects thirteen members of parliament (deputies) to represent the district for a four-year term by the D'Hondt method, a party-list proportional representation system. The electoral district covers the southern half of İzmir.

== Division ==
The first electoral district contains the following İzmir administrative districts (ilçe):

- Balçova
- Buca
- Çeşme
- Gaziemir
- Güzelbahçe
- Karabağlar
- Karaburun
- Konak
- Menderes
- Narlıdere
- Seferihisar
- Selçuk
- Torbalı
- Urla

== Members ==
MPs for İzmir (I), 1999 onwards
Seat	1999 (21st Parliament)	2002 (22nd Parliament)	2007 (23rd Parliament)	2011 (24th Parliament)	June 2015 (25th Parliament)
1	Güler Aslan; DSP	Enver Öktem; CHP	Güldal Mumcu; CHP		Tacettin Bayır; CHP
2	Saffet Başaran; DSP	Bülent Baratalı; CHP		Rıza Mahmut Türmen; CHP	Ahmet Tuncay Özkan; CHP
3	Burhan Suat Çağlayan; DSP	Abdurrezzak Erten; CHP		Oğuz Oyan; CHP	Selin Sayek Böke; CHP
4	Salih Dayıoğlu; DSP	Ahmet Ersin; CHP		Musa Çam; CHP	
5	Atilla Mutman; DSP	Türkan Miçooğulları; CHP	Harun Öztürk; CHP	Hülya Güven; CHP	Özcan Purçu; CHP
6	Rahmi Sezgin; DSP	Sedat Uzunbay; CHP	Şenol Bal; MHP	Erdal Aksünger; CHP	Ali Yiğit; CHP
7	Oktay Vural; MHP	Yılmaz Kaya; CHP	Oktay Vural; MHP		
8	Hakan Tartan; DSP	Erdal Karademir; CHP	İbrahim Hasgür; AK Party	İlhan İşbilen; AK Party	Aslan Savaşan; MHP
9	Yıldırım Ulupınar; DYP	Mehmet Aydın; AK Party		Ertuğrul Günay; AK Party	Ertuğrul Kürkcü; HDP
10	Sümer Oral; Anavatan	Mehmet Sayım Tekelioğlu; AK Party			Veysel Eroğlu; AK Party
11	Işılay Saygın; Anavatan	Tevfik Ensari; AK Party	Fatma Seniha Nükhet Hotar Göksel; AK Party	İlknur Denizli; AK Party	Fatma Seniha Nükhet Hotar Göksel; AK Party
12	Suha Tanık; Anavatan	Nükhet Hotar; AK Party	Tuğrul Yemişci; AK Party	Ali Aşlık; AK Party	Cemil Şeboy; AK Party
13	No seat			Rıfat Sait; AK Party	Hüseyin Kocabıyık; AK Party

== General elections ==
=== 2011 ===
2011 general election: İzmir (I)
Party	Candidate	Votes	%	±%
CHP	6 elected ▲1: 1. Şükran Güldal Mumcu ✓; 2. Rıza Mahmut Türmen ✓; 3. Oğuz Oyan ✓; 4. Musa Çam ✓; 5. Hülya Güven ✓; 6. Erdal Aksünger ✓; 7. Aydın Özcan ✗; 8. Turgay Bozoğlu ✗; 9. Adnan Erdil ✗; 10. Kazım Umdular ✗; 11. Seniye Nazik Işık ✗; 12. Ebru Okay ✗; 13. Şener Akdemir ✗	528,001	43.09	▲8.00
AK Party	6 elected ▲1: 1. Ertuğrul Günay ✓; 2. Mehmet Sayım Tekelioğlu ✓; 3. İlhan İşbilen ✓; 4. İlknur Denizli ✓; 5. Ali Aşlık ✓; 6. Rıfat Sait ✓; 7. Bilal Doğan ✗; 8. Cemal Bekle ✗; 9. Tülin Bozkurt Hazar ✗; 10. Harun Özdemir ✗; 11. Osman Sakman ✗; 12. Maksut Karaosman ✗; 13. Doğan Bayram ✗	454,390	37.08	▲5.48
MHP	1 elected ▼1: 1. Oktay Vural ✓; 2. Şenol Bal ✗; 3. Dursun Müsavat Dervişoğlu ✗; 4. Salahattin Şahin ✗; 5. Ümit Akkuş ✗; 6. Hasan Zerek ✗; 7. Turan Gündoğan ✗; 8. Hatice Bölük ✗; 9. Hasan Yıldız ✗; 10. Serap Özöktem ✗; 11. Mustafa Sepin ✗; 12. Mehmet Üste ✗; 13. Mevlüt Taga ✗	134,473	10.97	▼2.54
Independent	None elected: İsmail Altıkulaç ✗ Mehmet Tanhan ✗ Yaşar Müjdeci ✗ Tuncer Sümer ✗	68,156	5.56	▲1.58
HEPAR	None elected: 1. Osman Pamukoğlu ✗; 2. Celal Çalış ✗; 3. Pınar Türkoğlu ✗; 4. Oktay Ceylan ✗; 5. İsmail Yazan ✗; 6. Osman Ergin ✗; 7. İnanç Akkaplan ✗; 8. Yılmaz Şimşek ✗; 9. Ayşe Nur Tümer ✗; 10. Hatice Bedir ✗; 11. Esma Balta ✗; 12. Burcu Metin ✗; 13. Gürsel Koçelli ✗	8,950	0.73	▲0.73
DP	None elected: 1. Fatma Nuran Talu ✗; 2. Harun Kayacı ✗; 3. Erhan Kuzu ✗; 4. Gülgün Beşerler ✗; 5. Ali Şenol ✗; 6. Mine Tilki ✗; 7. Özlem Başkaya ✗; 8. Sevda Erkan ✗; 9. Ezgi Yaman ✗; 10. Selim Amato ✗; 11. Şenol Alpat ✗; 12. Mehmet Yurtseven ✗; 13. Filiz Kösedağ ✗	7,451	0.61	▼4.15
SAADET	None elected: 1. Şerafettin Kılıç ✗; 2. Turhan Tutumlu ✗; 3. Bayram Akgün ✗; 4. Cemal Arıkan ✗; 5. Mustafa Erduran ✗; 6. Selçuk Kavuşan ✗; 7. Zekeriye Hazırbulan ✗; 8. Rumeysa Meryem Aslan ✗; 9. Mümin Baştürk ✗; 10. Mehmet İntaş ✗; 11. Atilla Korkmaz ✗; 12. Mukadder Temur ✗; 13. Mumin Güzel ✗	5,609	0.46	▼0.41
Büyük Birlik	None elected: 1. İbrahim Uzun ✗; 2. Vahap Usman ✗; 3. İsmail Gider ✗; 4. Mehmet Özcan ✗; 5. Ziynet Aydın ✗; 6. Hüseyni Erenli ✗; 7. Talip Tekyıldırım ✗; 8. Ali Demiröz ✗; 9. Ahmet Kuzucu ✗; 10. Mustafa Çakmak ✗; 11. İsmail Mergen ✗; 12. Hayrettin Durur ✗; 13. Ali Aydın ✗	4,362	0.36	▲0.36
HAS Party	None elected: 1. İbrahim Bengi ✗; 2. Sadık Süleyman Şamlı ✗; 3. Lina Gahun ✗; 4. Hüseyin Aşıcı ✗; 5. Bülent Köroğlu ✗; 6. Mehmet Topçuoğlu ✗; 7. Hayrettin Ertaş ✗; 8. Yılmaz Şahin ✗; 9. Bilgi Tokel ✗; 10. Gülziye Şahin ✗; 11. Nihat Demirhan ✗; 12. Eyüp Baran ✗; 13. Bülent Güçlü ✗	3,442	0.28	▲0.28
DSP	None elected: 1. Rıfat Mutlu ✗; 2. Niyazi Emli ✗; 3. Behaettin Karaca ✗; 4. Süheyla Ceyhan ✗; 5. Mesut Özsabuncu ✗; 6. Haydar Durgeç ✗; 7. Ümit Rahmi Tuncel ✗; 8. İnanç Balcı ✗; 9. Turabi Turan Yılmaz ✗; 10. Baki Tanışık ✗; 11. Hüseyin Oğuz ✗; 12. Süheyla Erbaşol ✗; 13. Asiye Gülbin Sel ✗	3,205	0.26	N/A
MP	None elected: 1. Nejat Cebeci ✗; 2. Fatma Şentürk ✗; 3. Rayhan Keleş ✗; 4. Haluk Üyüklüer ✗; 5. İsmail Yardımcı ✗; 6. Nuri Kaya ✗; 7. Ayşe Tekbaş ✗; 8. Yasemin Emrullah ✗; 9. Mehmet Çetintaş ✗; 10. Medine Yalvaç ✗; 11. Hatice Can ✗; 12. Hülya Yaka ✗; 13. Emine Şahin ✗	2,323	0.19	▲0.19
TKP	None elected: 1. Kemal İbrahim Okuyan ✗; 2. İbrahim Bulut ✗; 3. Burhan Aksakal ✗; 4. Rağıp Ruhi Sayır ✗; 5. Tahsin Yılmaz ✗; 6. Birol Danabaş ✗; 7. Fatma Yanar ✗; 8. Ali Ekber Yurtsever ✗; 9. Şerife Şengül Mert ✗; 10. Serkan Başar ✗; 11. Dilek Yüksel ✗; 12. İbrahim Genç ✗; 13. Canan Aköz ✗	2,192	0.18	▼0.02
DYP	None elected: 1. Ekrem Önalan ✗; 2. Remezan Satan ✗; 3. Nuray Özdilek ✗; 4. Tamer Taşdemir ✗; 5. Mehmet Ali Özpınar ✗; 6. Asuman Çulha ✗; 7. Nurhayat Ant ✗; 8. Özdemir Keskin ✗; 9. Bedrettin Akay ✗; 10. Tarık Pehlivan ✗; 11. Burhan Bakır ✗; 12. Şerife Baytok ✗; 13. Mustafa Oğuz Zenginoğlu ✗	1,516	0.12	▲0.12
Nationalist Conservative	None elected: 1. Hasan Işık ✗; 2. Şükrü Yılmaz ✗; 3. Yılmaz Onarıcıoğlu ✗; 4. Gülsüm Koçak ✗; 5. İlker Yağcıoğlu ✗; 6. Naciye Şeremet ✗; 7. Ekrem Doğan ✗; 8. Osman Arzıman ✗; 9. Serkan Gökdağ ✗; 10. Halit Uslu ✗; 11. Fadime Çetin ✗; 12. Ali Haydar Önder ✗; 13. Mesut Torun ✗	980	0.08	▲0.08
Liberal Democrat	None elected: 1. Orkun Köksoy ✗; 2. Özlem Erdem ✗; 3. Metin Ferit Türkeli ✗; 4. Erkal Altay ✗; 5. Baki Baklan ✗; 6. Mustafa Mermerci ✗; 7. Sadrettin Turan ✗; 8. Havva Kocaman ✗; 9. Şevki Bakırbaş ✗; 10. Saide Dırdır ✗; 11. Şebnem Gümüş ✗; 12. Nurcan Soydan ✗; 13. Sevtap Pazarcı ✗	416	0.03	▼0.08
Labour	No candidates	0	0.00	0.00
Total votes		1,225,466	100.00	
Rejected ballots		22,856	1.83	▼0.64
Turnout		1,248,322	87.39	▲4.07
CHP hold Majority		73,611	6.01	▲2.52
