= International Apparel Federation =

Dutch organization

International Apparel Federation (IAF), established in 1976, is an international trade association whose membership includes national clothing associations and companies whose core business is the sourcing, designing, development, manufacturing, distribution, and retailing of apparel products.

In 2002, Umut Oran, president of Turkey's Clothing Manufacturers' Association (TGSD) took over the presidency of the IAF.
