= İlhan İşbilen =

Turkish politician (born 1946)

Personal details
- Born: 1 April 1946 (age 80)
- Spouse: Nebahat Evyap
- Occupation: Businessman and politician

İlhan İşbilen (born 1 April 1946) is a Turkish businessman and former Justice and Development Party (AKP) politician.

== Biography ==
He resigned from AKP in February 2014. İşbilen was charged under terrorism offences, accused of being a senior member of the Fetullah Terrorist Organization (FETÖ). He was sentenced to aggravated life imprisonment for his leading role in the 2016 Turkish coup attempt which resulted in the deaths of 251 people. He denied all charges against him.

He married Nebahat Evyap, her family founded the Evyap Group, a major Turkish soap and personal care company, while both were in their 60s, allegedly upon the instruction of Islamic preacher Fethullah Gülen, leader of FETÖ. Her name had also came up in the Panama Papers, which showed she transferred a large amount of money to offshore accounts in the tax haven British Virgin Islands before the Turkish courts ordered a freeze on the assets of the couple following the FETÖ investigation.

On 15 November 2019, his wife, Nebahat, transferred to Prince Andrew, Duke of York £750,000 described as a wedding gift for Princess Beatrice, his eldest daughter, in the belief that it would help her to secure a U.K. passport after she fled the Turkey. She wanted help moving her assets out of Turkey. The Duke repaid the funds. Further payments of £350,000, were made to Prince Andrew and £25,000 were paid to his younger daughter Princess Eugenie and £225,000 to his ex-wife, Sarah, Duchess of York, on the directives of Selman Turk. Selman Turk founded Heyman AI, the company that won an award from Prince Andrew at a Pitch@Palace event at St James's Palace on 6 November 2019 and later liquidated. The media in Turkey to labeled Turk as a “banker for FETÖ”.
