= Buna Werke Schkopau =

Chemical company

Buna Werke Schkopau were a chemical company specialising in the production of polymer materials such as plastics and artificial rubber. The name BUNA is derived from the technology of polymerising butadiene with sodium (chemical symbol: Na) as a catalyst.

== History ==
In order to make Germany independent from the importation of natural rubber, the first industrial plant for the production of artificial rubber was built in Schkopau near Halle (Saale) and named Buna-Werke GmbH Schkopau. It was a subsidiary of Ammoniakwerk Merseburg GmbH, later known as Leunawerke, which belonged to IG Farben. The foundation stone was laid in April 1936.

Production of artificial rubber started in 1937. Other products were PVC and basic chemicals such as trichlorethylene, formaldehyde, tetrahydrofuran, acetic acid, and acetone. Another factory, Hüls-Werke in Marl started production of Buna rubber in 1939.

== World War II ==
During World War II, a branch of Buna-Werke was built near Auschwitz, which employed forced labourers and inmates of Monowitz concentration camp. The latter camp was built on the factory grounds. It never produced rubber during its wartime life, and both plants were bombed by the Americans to inhibit the supply of fuel to the Wehrmacht. Both plants also used large numbers of slave labourers for which several members of the IG Farben company were prosecuted at Nuremberg after the war.

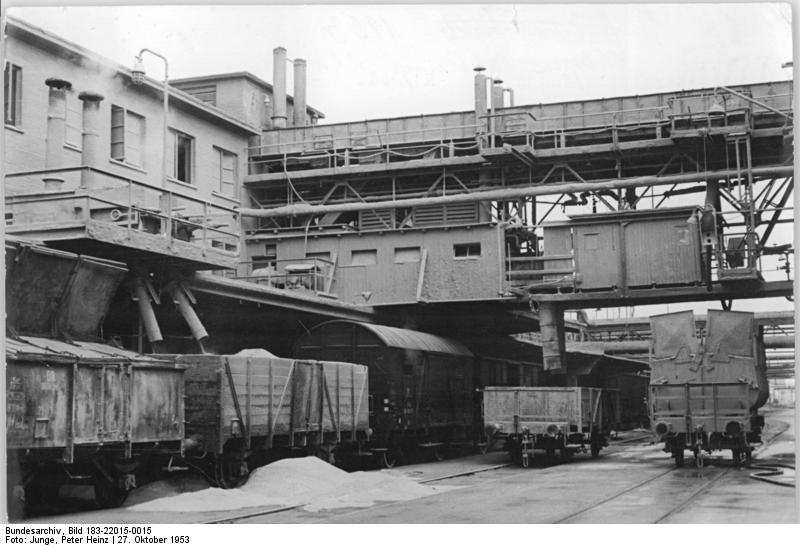
Chemische Werke Buna in 1953, shortly before being transferred into a VEB

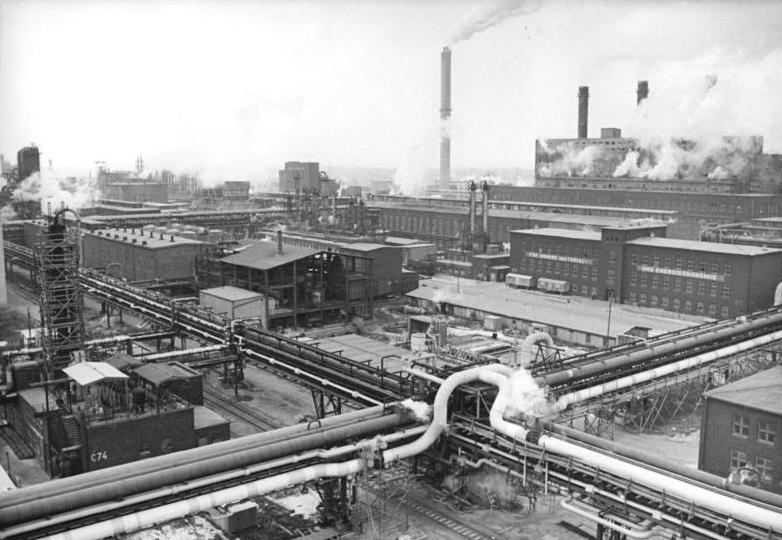
Buna Werke in 1980

Logo 1954-1990

Under Soviet administration after World War II, Buna Werke Schkopau were expropriated and – under the name Chemische Werke Buna – became part of Sowjetische Aktiengesellschaft (SAG) Kautschuk in order to cover reparation demands of the Soviet Union. They were transferred into a publicly owned corporation (VEB Chemische Werke Buna) within Kombinat Chemische Werke Buna. Its slogan Plaste und Elaste aus Schkopau referred to its main products, namely the rigid plastics (Plaste) and the elastic materials (synthetic rubbers, Elaste). With about 18000 employees, Buna Werke were one of the five largest industrial combines of the GDR. In order to provide sufficient accommodation for the workforce, new town quarters were built in Halle (Saale) and Merseburg. The new town of Halle-Neustadt was built specifically for the workers of the chemical plants in Schkopau and Leuna, and suburban railway lines provided transportation for commuters.

Buna Werke Schkopau became the world's largest producer of calcium carbide in 1958. Its outdated production plants caused severe environmental pollution.

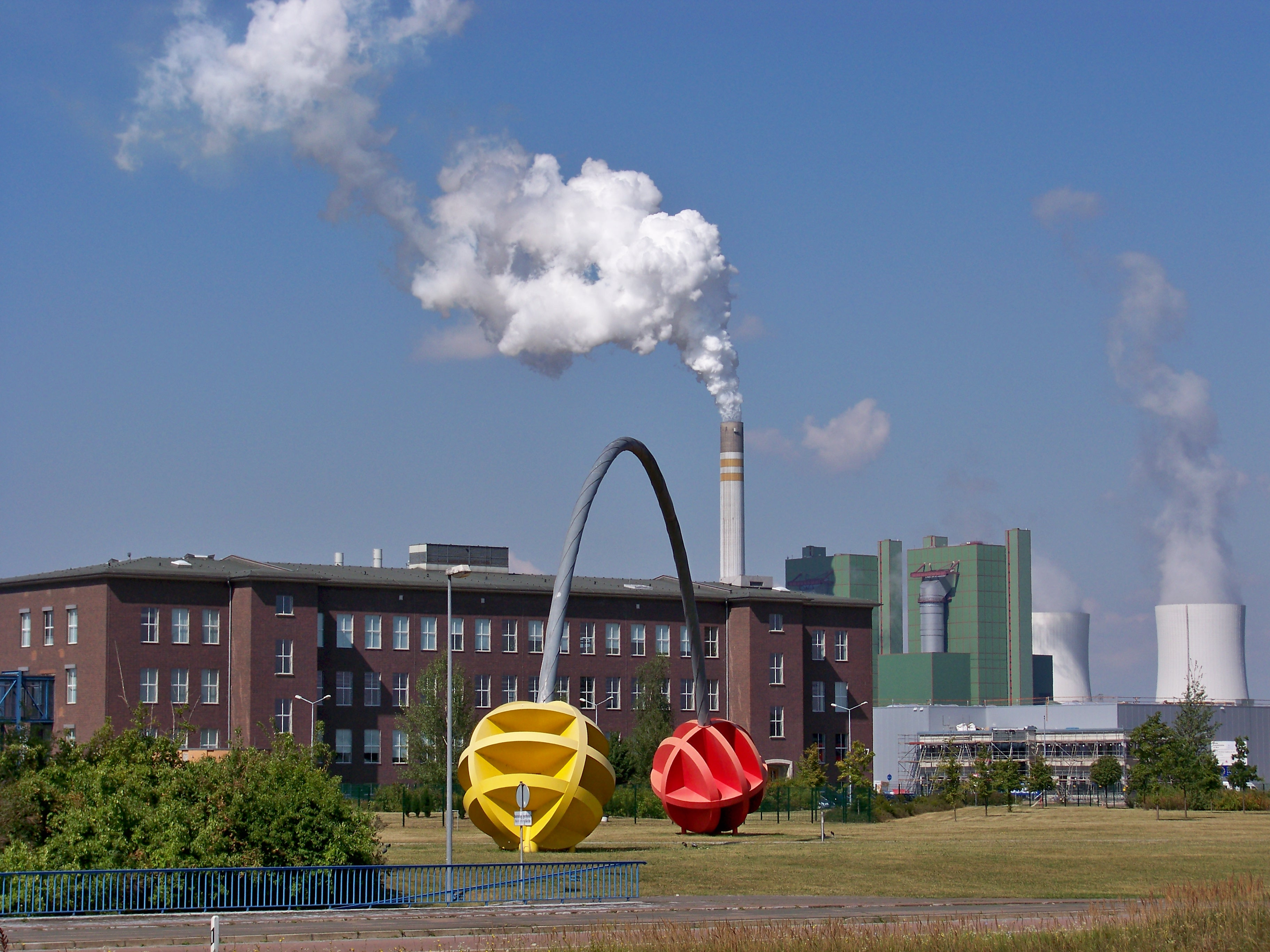
DOW arc in Schkopau

After the political changes in the GDR in 1989, Buna Werke were initially administered by Treuhandanstalt (later Bundesanstalt für vereinigungsbedingte Sonderaufgaben (BVS), a privatisation agency. In 1992, the works employed only 7200 people. In 1995, Dow Chemical took over large parts of the facilities, but only few employees. The outdated production facilities were demolished and the land rehabilitated for use. Rehabilitation expenses of BVS were estimated to be 809 million Deutsche Mark in 1999 alone.

Since 2004, the chemical works in Schkopau belong to Dow Olefinverbund GmbH, a subsidiary of Dow Chemical Company, its production of plastics and basic chemicals is now petroleum based and uses modern technologies.

In 2021, synthetic rubber production plant was purchased by Polish chemical company Synthos.

== Further information ==
- Gabriele Ahlefeld, Astrid Molder, Rudolf Werner: Plaste und Elaste aus Schkopau. 60 Jahre Buna-Werke. Runkel, Pinneberg 1996, ISBN 3-9803386-5-7 (in German).
- Dirk Hackenholz: Die elektrochemischen Werke in Bitterfeld 1914–1945. Ein Standort der IG-Farbenindustrie AG. LIT Verlag, Münster 2004, ISBN 3-8258-7656-X (Forschungen zur neuesten Geschichte 3) (doctoral thesis, Martin Luther University of Halle-Wittenberg, 2004, in German).
- "Geschichte der Buna-Werke Schkopau" (in German). Deutsches Chemie-Museum Merseburg. - History of Buna Werke
- "Registerauskunft" (in German). Deutsches Patent- und Markenamt. - Wordmark "Plaste und Elaste aus Schkopau"
- "Die Plastindustrie der DDR" (in German). Lehmann & Werder Museumsmedien. - The plastics industry in the GDR
