= Euratex =

European textile organization

Euratex (The European Apparel and Textile Organisation) is a European organisation based in Brussels, Belgium. It represents the European textile and clothing industry, and its main objective is to create an environment within the European Union which is conducive to the manufacture of textile and clothing products. It promotes the interests of its members while taking into account the European Union's institutional framework and its international obligations.

The European Union is the largest world market for textile and clothing products, with an apparent consumption of at least €415 billion. The European textile and clothing industry is the world's second largest exporter of textiles and the third largest for clothing. Its annual turnover is €147 billion as of 2022, although the number of companies in 2022 decreased to 143,000.

Euratex has member organizations in Austria, Belgium(2), Bulgaria, the Czech Republic, Denmark, Estonia, Finland, France(2), Germany, Greece, Hungary, Ireland, Italy, Latvia, Lithuania, Netherlands, Norway, Poland, Portugal, Romania, Slovakia, Slovenia, Spain, Sweden, Switzerland, Turkey(4), and the United Kingdom.

Euratex has also been authoring its own "Fact and Key Figure in the Textile and Clothing Industry" yearly compilations from 2012 to 2022.
