= Beydağ =

- District and municipality
- Map showing Beydağ District in İzmir Province

- Location in Turkey Beydağ (İzmir)
- Coordinates: 38°05′N 28°14′E
- Country: Turkey
- Province: İzmir

Government
  - Mayor: Feridun Yılmazlar (CHP)
- Area: 172 km^{2} (66 sq mi)
- Population (2022): 12,030
  - Density: 69.9/km^{2} (181/sq mi)
- Time zone: UTC+3 (TRT)
- Postal code: 35790
- Area code: 0232
- Website: www.beydag.bel.tr

Beydağ (Turkish: [ˈbejdaː]) is a municipality and district of İzmir Province, Turkey. Its area is 172 km^{2}, and its population is 12,030 (2022).

== Composition ==
There are 25 neighbourhoods in Beydağ District:

- Adaküre
- Aktepe
- Alakeçili
- Atatürk
- Bakırköy
- Beyköy
- Çamlık
- Çiftlikköy
- Çomaklar
- Cumhuriyet
- Eğridere
- Erikli
- Halıköy
- Karaoba
- Kurudere
- Menderes
- Mutaflar
- Palamutçuk
- Sarıkaya
- Tabaklar
- Yağcılar
- Yeniyurt
- Yeşiltepe
- Yukarı Aktepe
- Yukarı Tosunlar
