= İzmir (2nd electoral district) =

Electoral district for the Grand National Assembly of Turkey

İzmir (II)
- electoral district for the Grand National Assembly of Turkey
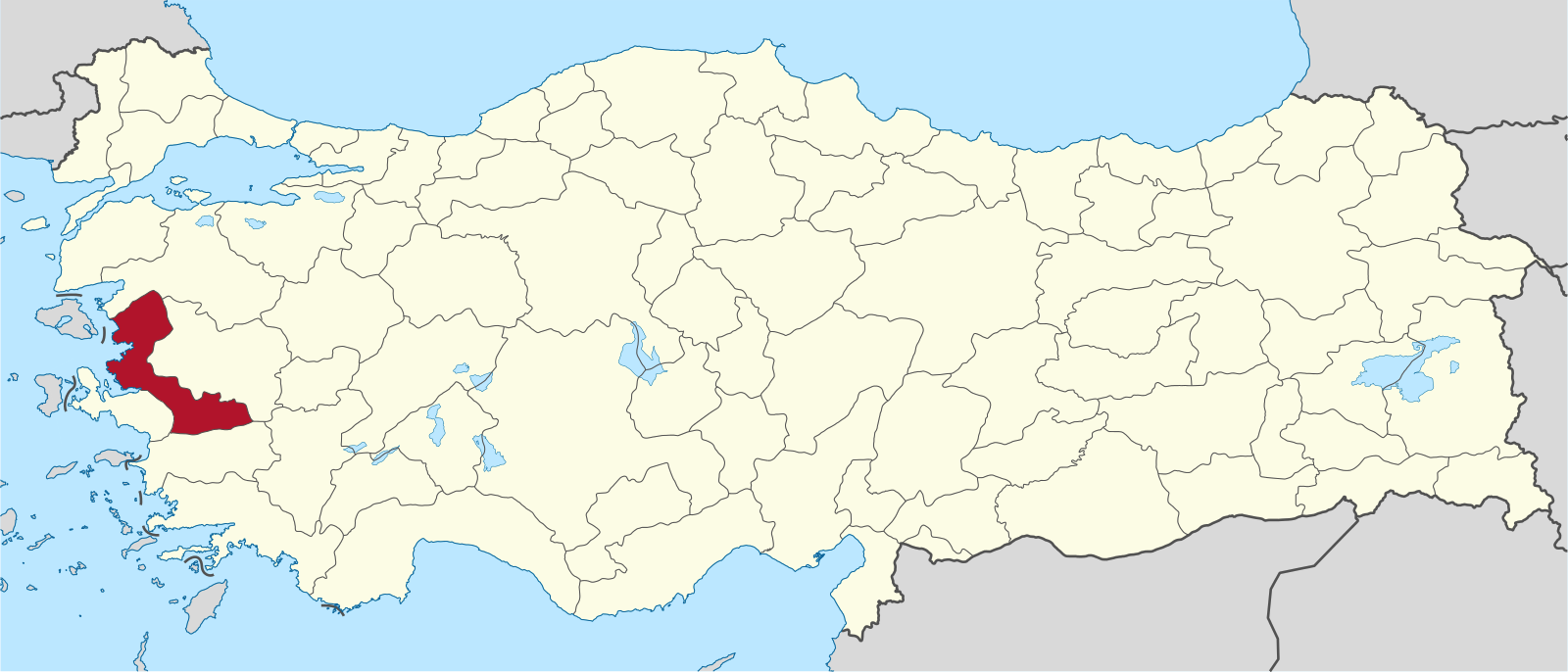
- İzmir (II) shown within Turkey
- Province: İzmir
- Electorate: 1,477,810

Current electoral district
- Created: 1923
- Seats: 13
- MPs: List: Alaattin Yüksel CHP Mustafa Ali Balbay CHP Mehmet Ali Susam CHP Rahmi Aşkın Türeli CHP Aytun Çıray CHP Birgül Güler CHP Mustafa Moroğlu CHP Binali Yıldırım AKP Aydın Şengül AKP Erdal Kalkan AKP Nesrin Ulema AKP Hamza Dağ AKP Ahmet Kenan Tanrıkulu MHP
- Parent district: İzmir
- Turnout at last election: 89.27%
- Representation
- CHP: 7 / 13
- AK Party: 4 / 13
- MHP: 1 / 13
- HDP: 1 / 13

İzmir's second electoral district is one of two divisions of İzmir province for the purpose of elections to Grand National Assembly of Turkey. It elects thirteen members of parliament (deputies) to represent the district for a four-year term by the D'Hondt method, a party-list proportional representation system. It covers northern and southeastern parts of İzmir.

== Division ==
The second electoral district contains the following İzmir administrative districts (ilçe):

- Aliağa
- Bayındır
- Bayraklı
- Bergama
- Beydağ
- Bornova
- Çiğli
- Dikili
- Foça
- Karşıyaka
- Kınık
- Kiraz
- Menemen
- Ödemiş
- Tire

== Members ==
MPs for İzmir (II), 1999 onwards
Seat	1999 (21st Parliament)	2002 (22nd Parliament)	2007 (23rd Parliament)	2011 (24th Parliament)
1	Burhan Bıçakçıoğlu; DSP	Kemal Anadol; CHP		Alaattin Yüksel; CHP
2	Mehmet Çümen; DSP	Oğuz Oyan; CHP		Mustafa Ali Balbay; CHP
3	Hayri Diri; DSP	Canan Arıtman; CHP		Mehmet Ali Susam; CHP
4	Şükrü Sina Gürel; DSP	Hakkı Akalın; CHP	Selçuk Ayhan; CHP	Rahmi Aşkın Türeli; CHP
5	Hasan Metin; DSP	Vezir Aydemir; CHP	Recai Birgün; CHP	Aytun Çıray; CHP
6	Mehmet Özcan; DSP	Ali Rıza Bodur; CHP	Mehmet Ali Susam; CHP	Birgül Güler; CHP / Patriotic
7	Yusuf Kırkpınar; MHP	Muharrem Toprak; CHP	Kamil Erdal Sipahi; MHP	Mustafa Moroğlu; CHP
8	Ahmet Kenan Tanrıkulu; MHP	Hakkı Ülkü; CHP	Ahmet Kenan Tanrıkulu; MHP	
9	Kemal Vatan; DSP	Zekeriya Akçam; AK Party	Vecdi Gönül; AK Party	Binali Yıldırım; AK Party
10	Hasan Ufuk Söylemez; DYP	İsmail Katmerci; AK Party		Aydın Şengül; AK Party
11	Işın Çelebi; Anavatan	Fazıl Karaman; AK Party	Taha Aksoy; AK Party	Erdal Kalkan; AK Party
12	Rifat Serdaroğlu; Anavatan	Serpil Yıldız; AK Party	Erdal Kalkan; AK Party	Nesrin Ulema; AK Party
13	No seat			Hamza Dağ; AK Party

== General elections ==
=== 2011 ===
2011 general election: İzmir (II)
Party	Candidate	Votes	%	±%
CHP	7 elected ▲1: 1. Alaattin Yüksel ✓; 2. Mustafa Ali Balbay ✓; 3. Mehmet Ali Susam ✓; 4. Rahmi Aşkın Türeli ✓; 5. Aytun Çıray ✓; 6. Birgül Güler ✓; 7. Mustafa Moroğlu ✓; 8. Levent Eyipişiren ✗; 9. Elfin Tataroğlu ✗; 10. Levent Piriştina ✗; 11. Özcan Purçu ✗; 12. Hüseyin Sezer ✗; 13. Coşkun Çiflik ✗	569,885	44.26	▲8.43
AK Party	5 elected ▲1: 1. Binali Yıldırım ✓; 2. Aydın Şengül ✓; 3. Erdal Kalkan ✓; 4. Nesrin Ulema ✓; 5. Hamza Dağ ✓; 6. Bekir Pakdemirli ✗; 7. Hasan Şahin ✗; 8. Müjde Özkumova ✗; 9. Tolga Murat Balıkçı ✗; 10. Uğur Türkan ✗; 11. Abdullah Tekbaş ✗; 12. Yeşim Demirali ✗; 13. Mehmut Kavuk ✗	469,891	36.49	▲7.12
MHP	1 elected ▼1: 1. Ahmet Kenan Tanrıkulu ✓; 2. Kamil Erdal Sipahi ✗; 3. Süeda Neslihan Çelik ✗; 4. Yalçın Koçyiğit ✗; 5. Ebuzer Özgür Çakmak ✗; 6. Cengiz Bulut ✗; 7. Mustafa Basmacı ✗; 8. Sündüz Uzun ✗; 9. Mehmet Toptaş ✗; 10. Lütfi Kılıç ✗; 11. İnanç Bilgi ✗; 12. Mustafa Emre Eryıldırım ✗; 13. Ebubekir Sıddık Korkmaz ✗	149,117	11.58	▼2.68
Independent	None elected: Ali Acar ✗ Erdal Avcı ✗ Doğu Perinçek ✗ Mehmet Kürşat Kayabaşı ✗ Rahmiye Kubilay ✗ Tarcan Ülük ✗	52,641	4.09	▲0.14
DP	None elected: 1. Ayşe Sucu ✗; 2. Ahmet Emirhan ✗; 3. Metin Tekinözer ✗; 4. Adem Birinci ✗; 5. Hakkı Sayar ✗; 6. Serhat Bilgili ✗; 7. Ayşe Ayaz ✗; 8. Edibe Nacir ✗; 9. Doğan Bayık ✗; 10. Aynur Yıldırım ✗; 11. Haluk Güntan ✗; 12. Mesut Yankın ✗; 13. Ferudun Aktı ✗	11,053	0.86	▼4.77
HEPAR	None elected: 1. Asım Taş ✗; 2. İsmail Tetik ✗; 3. Polat Vardar ✗; 4. Nafiz Saraçlar ✗; 5. Alper Akbaş ✗; 6. Ahmet Şenol ✗; 7. Melike Tunalı ✗; 8. Emine Güven ✗; 9. Fatma Nazan Tezver ✗; 10. Meral Erdoğan Kocademir ✗; 11. Osman Sönmezler ✗; 12. Fatma Yaykın ✗; 13. Ece Yılmaz ✗	8,095	0.63	▲0.63
SAADET	None elected: 1. Bayram Sakartepe ✗; 2. Mesut Dağ ✗; 3. Vedat Kolukısa ✗; 4. Suna Canıtez ✗; 5. Cenk Kılıç ✗; 6. Nacettin Yolcu ✗; 7. Orhan Halıcı ✗; 8. Mustafa Özüdoğru ✗; 9. İbrahim Orakçı ✗; 10. Ahmet Korkmaz ✗; 11. Orhan Yıldırım ✗; 12. Cengiz Utkulu ✗; 13. Ayhan Bilgi ✗	5,777	0.45	▼0.45
HAS Party	None elected: 1. Ömer Vehbi Hatipoğlu ✗; 2. Levent Peşker ✗; 3. Sibel Sayılkan ✗; 4. Hüseyin Tomruk ✗; 5. Aydın Demir ✗; 6. Mustafa Çakaray ✗; 7. Fehmi Algan ✗; 8. Altan Bozdemir ✗; 9. Yılmaz Turan ✗; 10. Numan Yıldırım ✗; 11. Ferah Semet ✗; 12. Uğur Gülgör ✗; 13. Kübra Durmaz ✗	4,147	0.32	▲0.32
Büyük Birlik	None elected: 1. Vural Turan ✗; 2. Mehmet Altaylı ✗; 3. Mehmet Hopa ✗; 4. Hacı İbrahim Kireşci ✗; 5. Cahit Aguş ✗; 6. Yavuz Nar ✗; 7. Ayşe Serap Uslu ✗; 8. Ahmet Takmaz ✗; 9. Gürhan Ağbulak ✗; 10. Erkan Budak ✗; 11. Sedat Güngör ✗; 12. Nizamettin Yılmaz ✗; 13. Osman Özarslan ✗	4,000	0.31	▲0.31
DSP	None elected: 1. Erol Tuncer ✗; 2. Fatih Taşdöğen ✗; 3. Adnan Taşar ✗; 4. Selçuk Karakülçe ✗; 5. Bülent Sarı ✗; 6. Hasan Tıraşoğlu ✗; 7. Süleyman Karadayı ✗; 8. Mahmut Açıkkar ✗; 9. Muzaffer Tuzcu ✗; 10. Hacı Bektaş Önal ✗; 11. Özge Üngüt ✗; 12. Recep Özdilek ✗; 13. Bülent Vatansever ✗	3,749	0.29	N/A
MP	None elected: 1. Rafet Kaya ✗; 2. Şenay Cebeci ✗; 3. Ülkü Çoban ✗; 4. Vedat Üyüklüer ✗; 5. Bülent Ulutaş ✗; 6. Ergün Boyacıoğlu ✗; 7. Hüseyin Ay ✗; 8. İbrahim Cibişoğlu ✗; 9. Mehmet Ali Kayalıo ✗; 10. Senem Sarılar ✗; 11. Hatice Nergizciler ✗; 12. Naciye Batmaz ✗; 13. Davut Kayalıo ✗	3,134	0.24	▲0.24
DYP	None elected: 1. Muzaffer Tan ✗; 2. Canan Atasayar ✗; 3. Sacit Sedat Ebesek ✗; 4. İsmail Özer ✗; 5. Murat Taşlıçay ✗; 6. Süleyman Levent Koral ✗; 7. Ali Turgut ✗; 8. Yıldız Kesebir ✗; 9. Şafak Ebesek ✗; 10. Ahmet Alp Yapşık ✗; 11. Hayriye Derya Balcı ✗; 12. Hüseyin Kutluay ✗; 13. Mehmet Altundağ ✗	2,647	0.21	▲0.21
TKP	None elected: 1. Seher Ünver ✗; 2. Özgür Sarı ✗; 3. Serdar Eliaçık ✗; 4. Fatma Sema Say ✗; 5. Mehmet Bektaş ✗; 6. Nesil Güney ✗; 7. Erol Geyik ✗; 8. Bayram Töre ✗; 9. Esma Bozkurt ✗; 10. Selma Eraslan ✗; 11. Özlem Onay ✗; 12. Ercan Güler ✗; 13. Birand Berberoğlu ✗	2,010	0.16	▼0.10
Nationalist Conservative	None elected: 1. Sibel Nebile Türük ✗; 2. Bülent Ufuk Çayırcı ✗; 3. Rafet Kara ✗; 4. Serdar Gökdağ ✗; 5. İsmail Başdemir ✗; 6. Fatma Dudu Uyanık ✗; 7. Nalan Çam ✗; 8. Durkut Hopacı ✗; 9. Adnan Göksel ✗; 10. Adalet Aydın ✗; 11. Gülbahar Dalkıran ✗; 12. Ali Zent ✗; 13. Şaban Torun ✗	849	0.07	▲0.07
Liberal Democrat	None elected: 1. Güler Nalbantoğlu ✗; 2. Celal Görmüş ✗; 3. Zekai Yılmaz ✗; 4. Münüre Yeşil ✗; 5. Gökhan Vatansever ✗; 6. Neriman Oflaz ✗; 7. Cihat Gümüş ✗; 8. Gülcan Köksoy ✗; 9. Suna Yasak ✗; 10. Esergül Öztürk Hepşennur ✗; 11. Ali Bayrakdaroğlu ✗; 12. Meral Köksoy ✗; 13. Zayide Arslan ✗	659	0.05	▼0.09
Labour	No candidates	0	0.00	0.00
Total votes		1,287,655	100.00	
Rejected ballots		31,556	2.39	▼0.34
Turnout		1,319,211	89.27	▲2.74
CHP hold Majority		99,994	7.77	▲1.31
