= İzmir (electoral districts) =

Electoral district for the Grand National Assembly of Turkey

- electoral district for the Grand National Assembly of Turkey
- İzmir shown within Turkey
- Province: İzmir
- Electorate: 2,906,224

Current electoral district
- Created: 1923
- Seats: 28 Historical: 24 (1995-2011) 19 (1987-1995) 16 (1983-1987) 19 (1977-1983) 18 (1969-1977) 17 (1961-1969) 22 (1957-1961) 22 (1954-1957)
- MPs: List: 1st district 2nd district
- Subdistricts: 1st district 2nd district
- Turnout at last election: 88.33%
- Representation
- CHP: 14 / 28
- AK Party: 8 / 28
- MHP: 2 / 28
- HDP: 2 / 28
- İYİ: 2 / 28

İzmir is a Turkish province divided into two electoral districts of the Grand National Assembly of Turkey. It elects 26 members of parliament (deputies) to represent the province of the same name for a four-year term by the D'Hondt method, a party-list proportional representation system.

== Members ==
Population reviews of each electoral district are conducted before each general election, which can lead to certain districts being granted a smaller or greater number of parliamentary seats. İzmir is the third largest province in Turkey and saw an increase in its seat allocation ahead of the 2011 election to 26 members, 13 per district.

The province's administrative districts (ilçe) are divided among two electoral districts as follows:

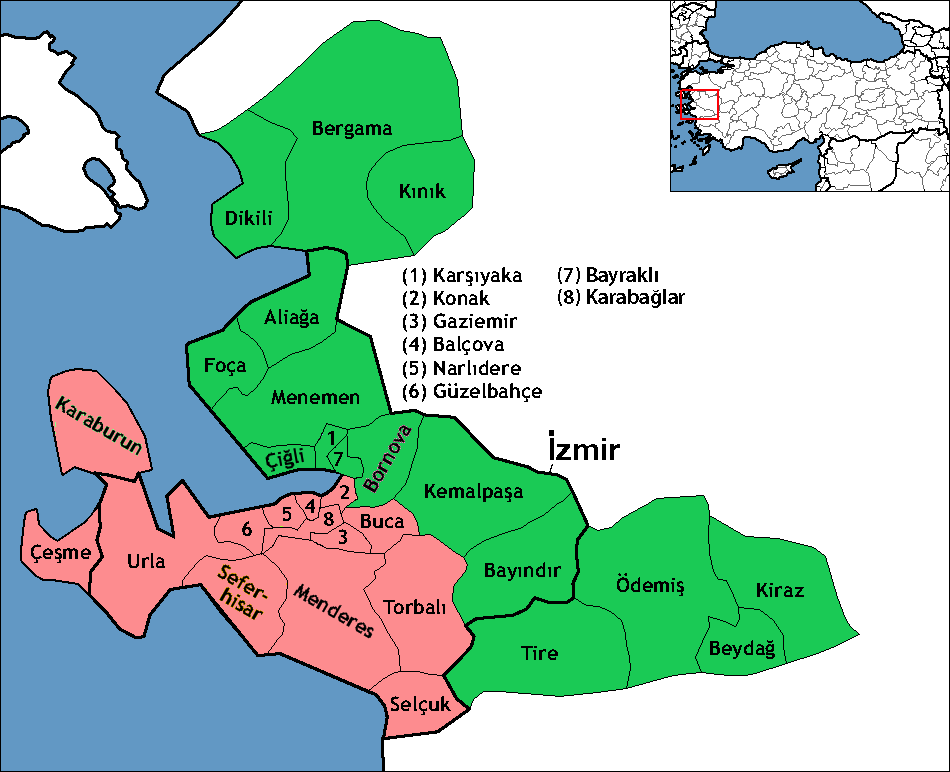
The two electoral districts of İzmir First electoral district (13 MPs) Second electoral district (13 MPs)

1st district	2nd district
Balçova; Buca; Çeşme; Gaziemir; Güzelbahçe; Karabağlar; Karaburun; Konak; Menderes; Narlıdere; Seferihisar; Selçuk; Torbalı; Urla	Aliağa; Bayındır; Bayraklı; Bergama; Beydağ; Bornova; Çiğli; Dikili; Foça; Karşıyaka; Kemalpaşa; Kınık; Kiraz; Menemen; Ödemiş; Tire

== General elections ==
=== 2011 ===
General Election 2011: İzmir
Party	Candidates standing			Votes			Seats won			
Party	1st	2nd	Total	Number	%	swing	1st	2nd	Total elected	±
CHP	13	13	26	1,097,886	43.69	▲8.22	6	7	13 / 26	▲2
AK Party	13	13	26	924,281	36.78	▲6.26	6	5	11 / 26	▲1
MHP	13	13	26	283,590	11.28	▼2.59	1	1	2 / 26	▼2
Independents	4	6	10	120,797	4.81	▼0.83	0	0	0 / 26	0
Democrat	13	13	26	18,504	0.74	▼4.45	0	0	0 / 26	0
HEPAR	13	13	26	17,046	0.68	▲0.68	0	0	0 / 26	0
Felicity	13	13	26	11,386	0.45	▼0.43	0	0	0 / 26	0
BBP	13	13	26	8,362	0.33	▲0.33	0	0	0 / 26	0
HAS Party	13	13	26	7,589	0.30	▲0.30	0	0	0 / 26	0
Democratic Left	13	13	26	6,954	0.28	N/A	0	0	0 / 26	0
Nation	13	13	26	5,457	0.22	▲0.22	0	0	0 / 26	0
Communist	13	13	26	4,202	0.17	▼0.07	0	0	0 / 26	0
DYP	13	13	26	4,163	0.17	▲0.17	0	0	0 / 26	0
Nationalist Conservative	13	13	26	1,829	0.07	▲0.07	0	0	0 / 26	0
Liberal Democrat	13	13	26	1,075	0.04	▼0.08	0	0	0 / 26	0
Labour	0	0	0	0	0.00	0.00	0	0	0 / 26	0
Total				2,513,121	100.00	Steady	13	13	26	▲2
Rejected ballots				61,859	2.41	▼0.19				
Turnout				2,567,533	88.34	▲3.55				
CHP hold Majority				173,605	6.91	▲1.96				

=== June 2015 ===
Abbr.	Party	Votes	%
CHP	Republican People's Party	1,202,151	45.4%
AK Party	Justice and Development Party	694,282	26.2%
MHP	Nationalist Movement Party	363,065	13.7%
HDP	Peoples' Democratic Party	273,209	10.3%
	Other	114,657	4.3%
Total		2,647,364	
Turnout		85.8%	
source: YSK

=== November 2015 ===
Abbr.	Party	Votes	%
CHP	Republican People's Party	1,264,541	46.8%
AK Party	Justice and Development Party	839,079	31%
MHP	Nationalist Movement Party	307,057	11.4%
HDP	Peoples' Democratic Party	233,653	8.6%
	Other	59,976	2.2%
Total		2,704,306	
Turnout		87.1%	
source: YSK

=== 2018 ===
Abbr.	Party	Votes	%
CHP	Republican People's Party	1,180,767	41.8%
AK Party	Justice and Development Party	776,243	27.4%
HDP	Peoples' Democratic Party	319,815	11.3%
IYI	Good Party	311,412	11%
MHP	Nationalist Movement Party	172,927	6.1%
	Other	66,833	2.4%
Total		2,827,997	
Turnout		87.6%	
source: YSK

== Presidential elections ==
=== 2014 ===
Presidential Election 2014: İzmir
Party	Candidate	Votes	%
Independent	Ekmeleddin İhsanoğlu	1,382,712	58.65
AK Party	Recep Tayyip Erdoğan	786,967	33.38
HDP	Selahattin Demirtaş	188,028	7.98
Total votes		2,357,707	100.00
Rejected ballots		35,957	1.50
Turnout		2,393,664	78.62
Ekmeleddin İhsanoğlu win			
