= Turkish Feminism Movement =

Feminist movement in Turkey

Turkish Feminism Movement is a feminist organization that is formed as a reading group, turned into a movement after Turkey's withdrawal from Istanbul Convention.

One of the Movement's founding members Hilal Gül stated that the movement's mission is "Ensuring equality between men and women in every field and turning this real without the extension of any political subject.". Another founding member Elif Çolpanay Turan said that the movement's difference from other movements is "You are walking for femicides, throwing slogans for Sakine Cansız. We wanted to create a new way because we are being disturbed by that."

== Criticism ==
Turkish Feminism Movement announced that they got many reactions after their founding. They've been criticized by HDP parliament member Filiz Kerestecioğlu after they pointed that "Feminism is trying to be associated with terror in Turkey".
