= Lead Mosque =

Lead Mosque may refer to:

- Lead Mosque, Shkodër in Shkodër, Albania
- Lead Mosque, Berat in Berat, Albania
- Lead Mosque (Xhamia Muradie) in Vlora, Albania
- Leaden Mosque in Trikala, Greece
- Lead Mosque and Complex in Eskishehir, Turkey
