= Alaeddin Mosque (disambiguation) =

Alaeddin Mosque, or Alaaddin Mosque is the name of a number of mosques, mostly in Turkey. It may refer to:

- Alaaddin Mosque (Sinop), in Sinop, Turkey
- Alâeddin Mosque, in Konya, Turkey
- Alaeddin Mosque (Eskişehir), in Eskişehir, Turkey
- Alaeddin Mosque (Jugra, Malaysia), in Jugra, Selangor, Malaysia
- Yivliminare Mosque, called also Alaaddin Mosque, in Antalya, Turkey
