= Reşadiye Mosque =

Mosque in Eskişehir, Turkey

- Reşadiye Camii
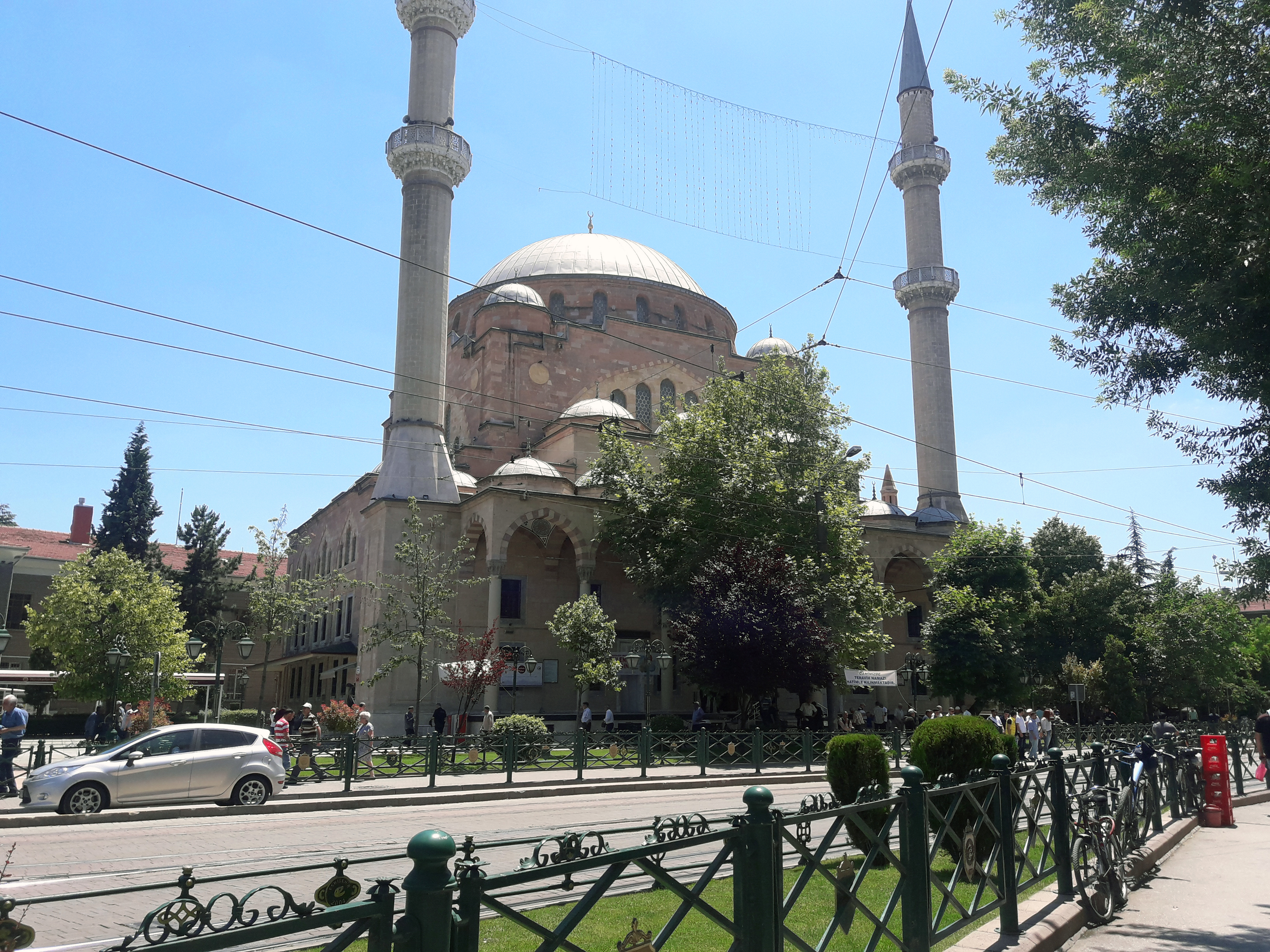

Location
- Municipality: Eskişehir
- Country: Turkey
- Interactive map of Reşadiye Mosque
- Coordinates: 39°46′18″N 30°31′01″E

Architecture
- Architect: Cevat Ulger
- Type: mosque
- Completed: 1979
- Minaret: 2

The Reşadiye Mosque (Turkish: Reşadiye Camii) is a mosque in Eskişehir, Turkey.

The mosque is in Arifiye neighborhood of Odunpazarı ilçe (district). The street to the north west of the mosque is also named Reşadiye. The mosque was built in 1916 by Ottoman Sultan Mehmet V (reigned 1909–1918), who was also known as Reşat. In 1979, it was rebuilt keeping the former name. Although its architect was Cevat Ulger, it was completed after the death of its architect. The mosque with two minarets was designed after the style of the historical New Mosque in Eminönü, Istanbul
