= Museum of Independence, Eskişehir =

Museum in Eskişehir, Turkey

Museum of Independence
- Kurtuluş Müzesi
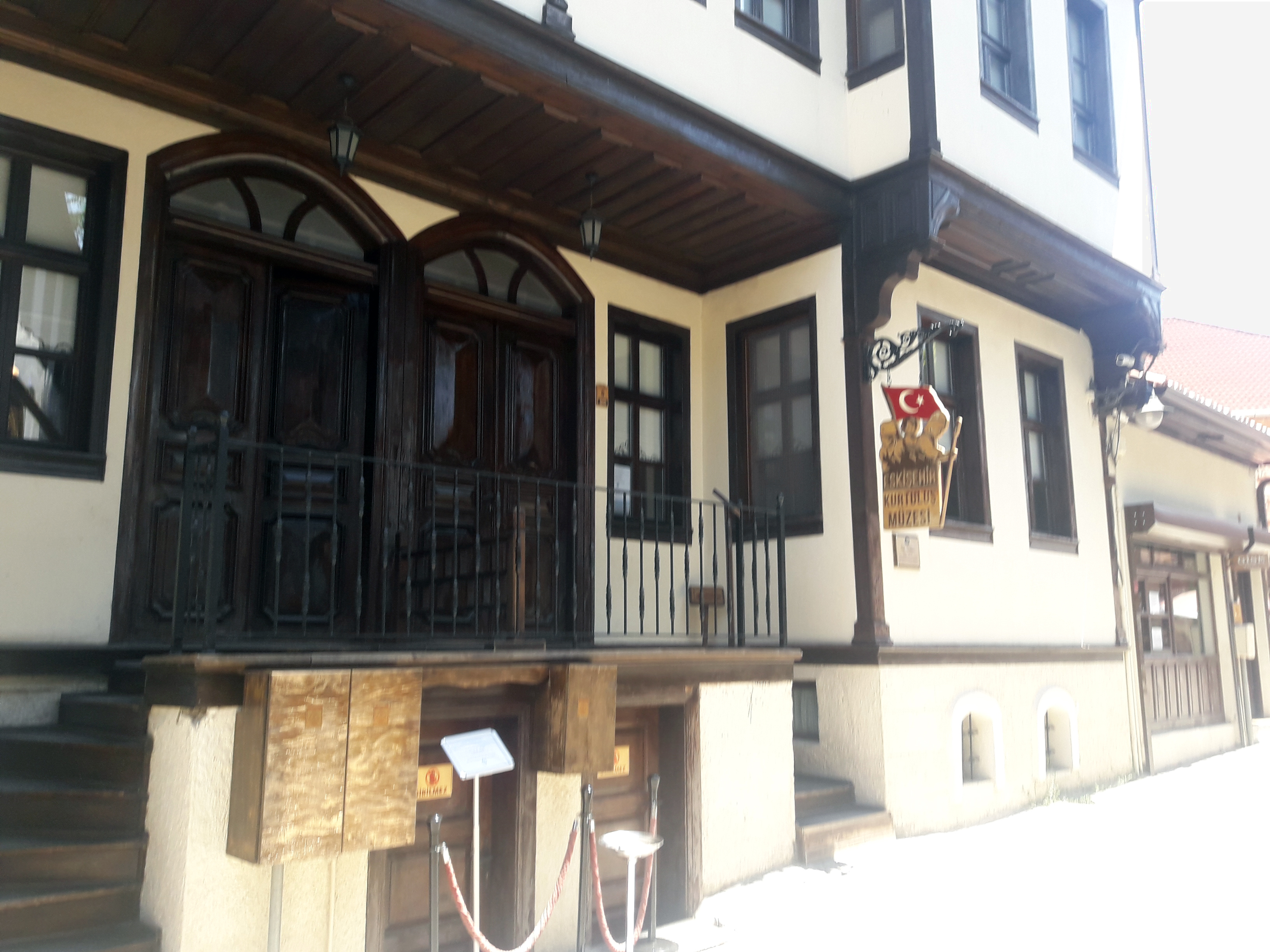
- Eskişehir Museum of Independence building

- Location of the museum in Turkey.
- Established: October 29, 2016; 9 years ago
- Location: Odunpazarı, Eskişehir, Turkey
- Coordinates: 39°45′52″N 30°31′25″E
- Type: History
- Founder: Eskişehir Metropolitan Municipality
- Owner: Eskişehir Metropolitan Municipality

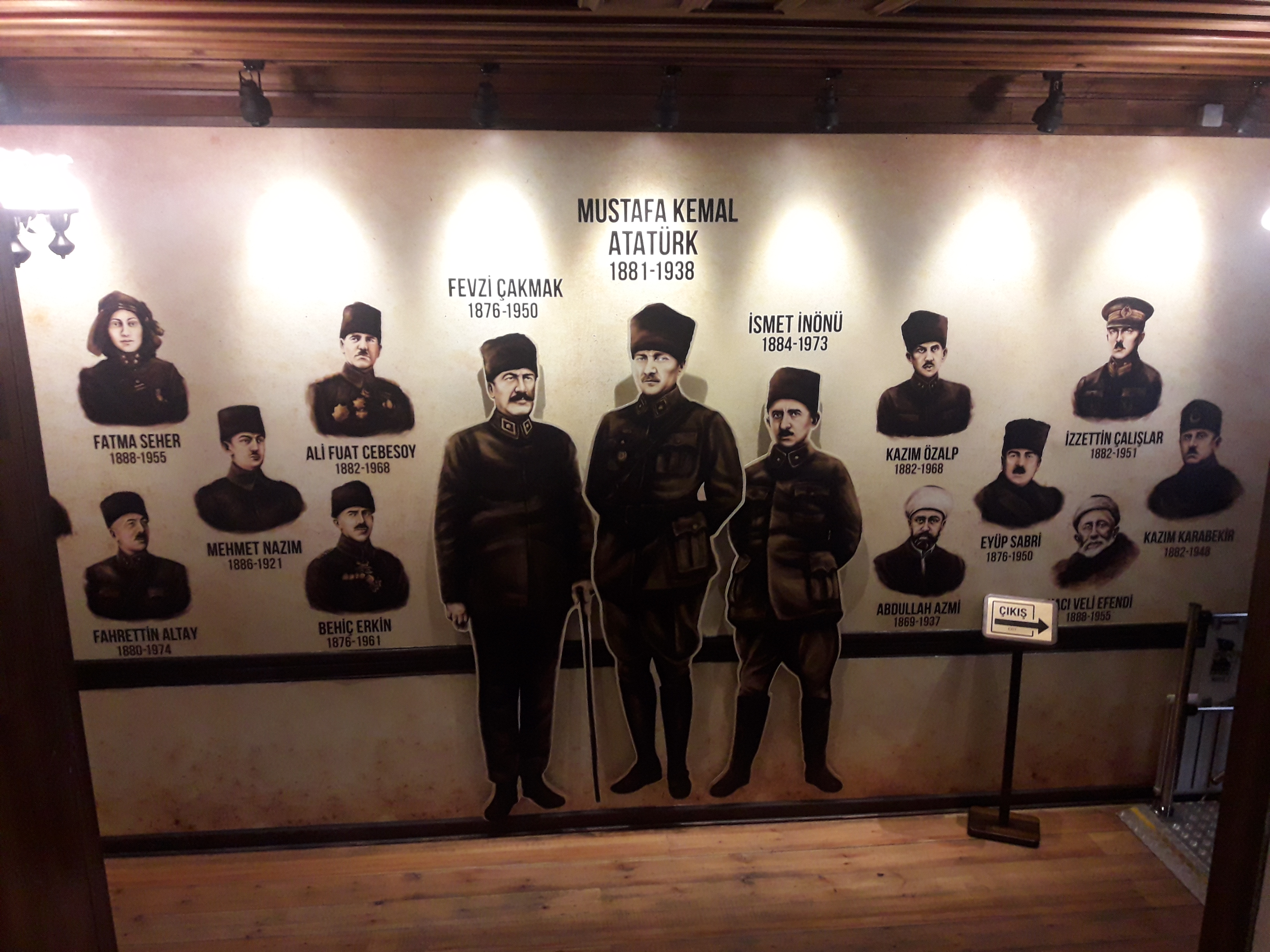
Eskişehir Museum of Independence wax sculpture of the main heroes

Museum of Independence (Turkish: Kurtuluş Müzesi) is a history museum in Odunpazarı, Eskişehir, Turkey. Established in 2016, it is dedicated to the Turkish War of Independence.

The museum was established by the Metropolitan Municipality of Eskişehr, and was inaugurated on October 29, 2016, the 93rd anniversary of the proclamation of the Turkish Republic. The museum is situated in the historic Mestanoğlu Halil Mansion, which was restored for this purpose in a project of June 2015. The fact that İsmet İnönü, commander of the Turkish troops during the First Battle of İnönü (1921), stayed in the mansion, was key to the selection of the site.

The museum blends information and documents with the help of contemporary technology. On the ground floor, a section is reserved for use by children. By using touchscreens, events of the Turkish War of Independence (1919–1923) and the Conference of Lausanne (1922–1923) are explained. Moreover, children can entertain with computer games found in four rooms on the upper floor, such as "War of Independence with Cartoons", "War of Independence with Newspapers", "Strategy Room" and "Presentation Room". In the "Cartoons Room", cartoons in humor magazines published between 1919 and 1923 are on display that depicts the Allies occupying Istanbul, the Ottoman Government of Ahmet Tevfik Pasha, and people and corporations opposing the War of Independence. In the "Strategy Room", the First Battle of İnönü is depicted. The room also contains wax sculptures of İsmet İnönü, Fahrettin Altay and Mehmetchik. In the "Presentation Room", visual objects depicting the War of Independence are on display in chronological order. One room on the ground floor serves the visitors as a place for taking selfie in front of the photos of Mustafa Kemal Atatürk or War of Independence.
