= Yılmaz Büyükerşen Wax Museum =

- Yılmaz Büyükerşen Balmumu Heykeller Müzesi
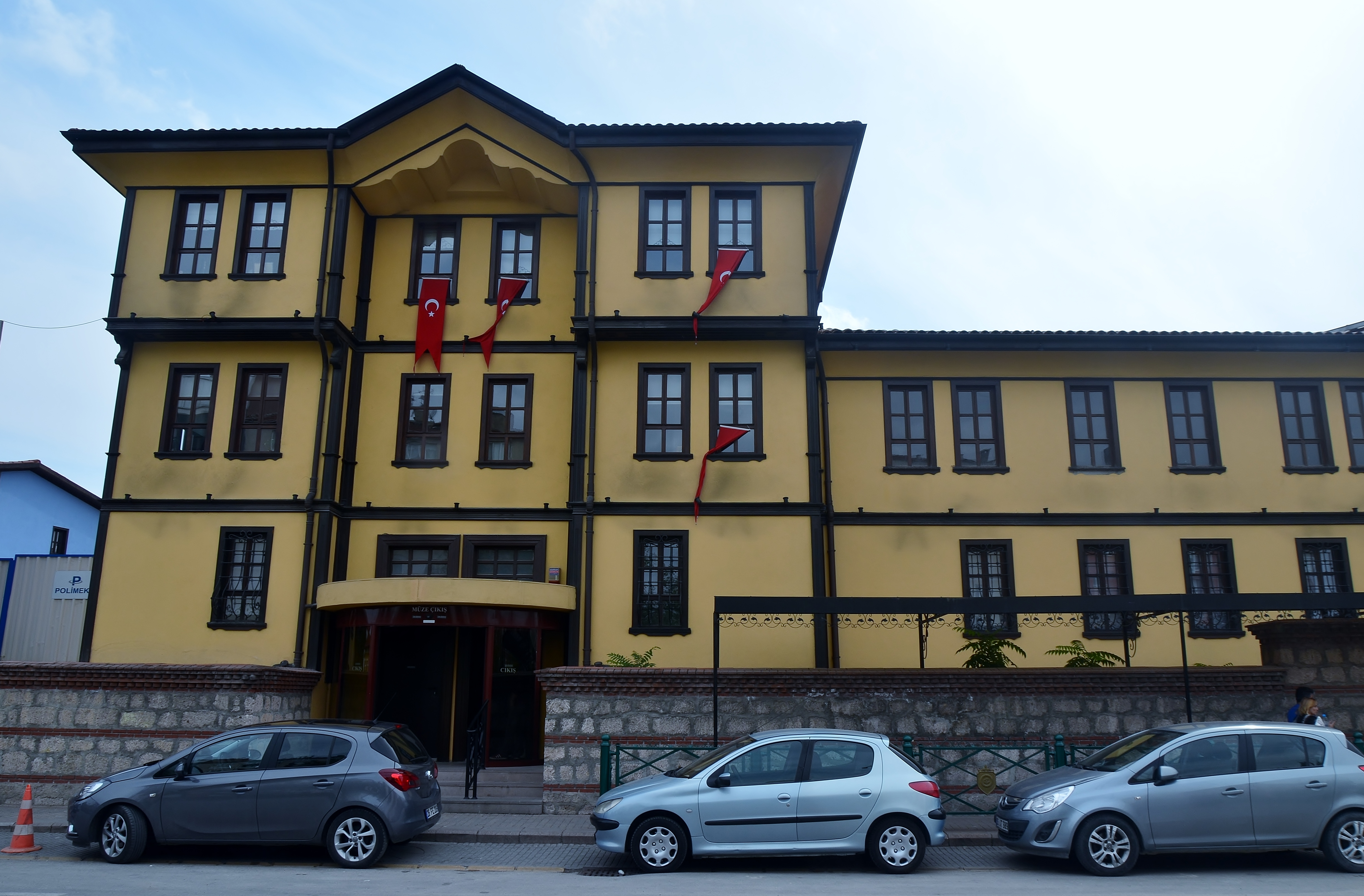
- Museum building

- Yılamz Büyükerşen Wax Museum
- Established: 2013; 13 years ago
- Location: Atatürk Boulevard, Eskişehir, Turkey
- Coordinates: 39°45′54″N 30°31′19″E
- Type: Wax Museum
- Founder: Yılmaz Büyükerşen
- Owner: Eskişehir Municipality

Yılmaz Büyükerşen Wax Museum, also known as Eskişehir Wax Museum, (Turkish: Yılmaz Büyükerşen Balmumu Heykeller Müzesi) is a wax museum in Odunpazarı second level municipality in Greater Eskişehir, Turkey.

The museum is situated on Atatürk Boulevard at 39°45′54″N 30°31′19″E. It is next to various other museums. It was established on 19 May 2013 by Yılmaz Büyükerşen, sculptor and the mayor of Eskişehir Metropolitan Municipality. The museum revenues are to be used in the education of female students and in general students with disabilities.

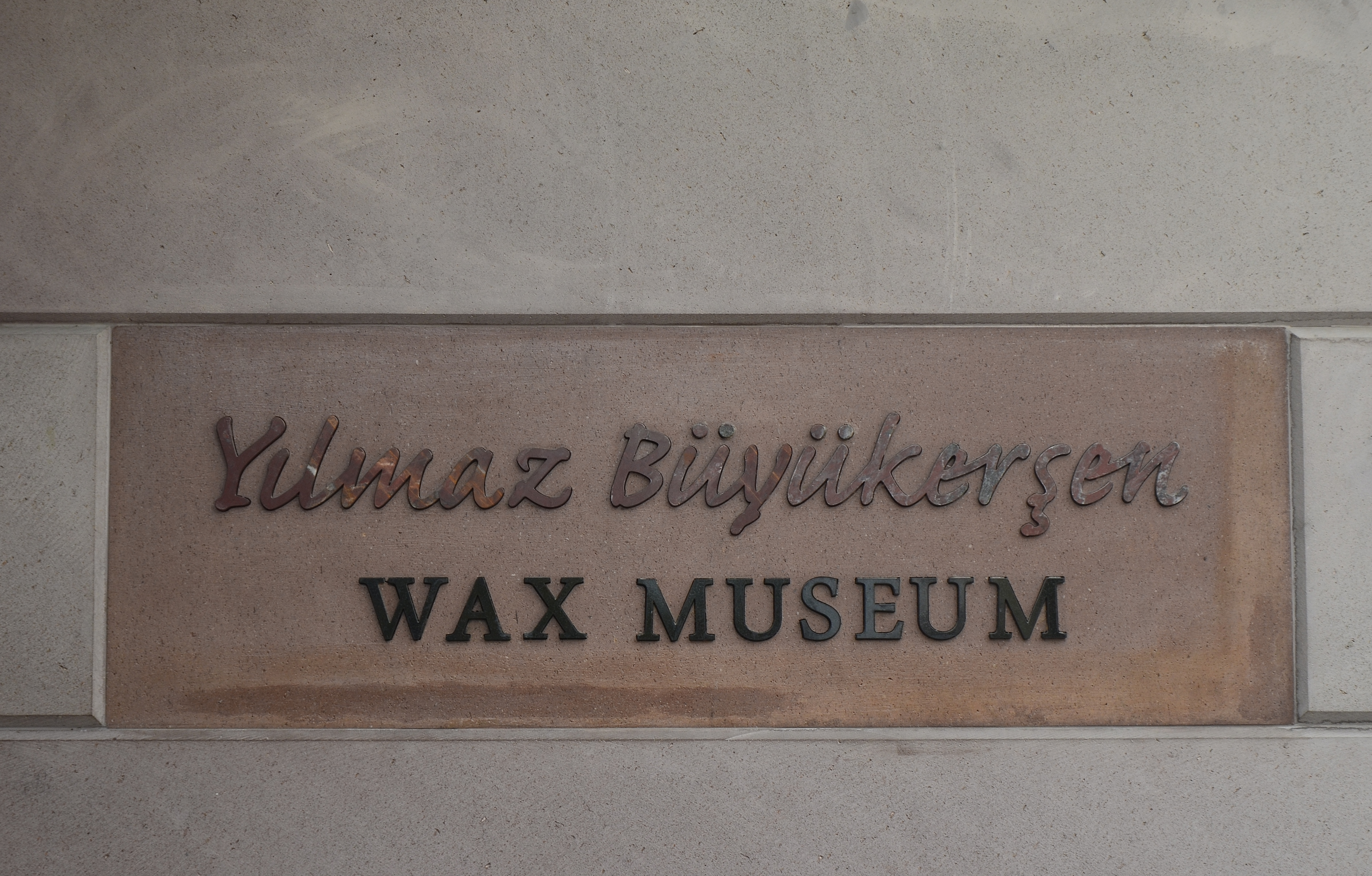
Namesplate of the museum at entrance.

There are 198 wax sculptures exhibited in five halls in the museum. The halls are;

Hall A: Atatürk (founder of Turkey) and his family, Turkish War of Independence, some of the Ottoman sultans
Hall B: Aviation, railroads, press, industry, science, sports, foreign leaders, Turkish actors and other artists
Hall C: Historical characters
Hall D: Democracy (in this hall taking photography is not permitted).
Hall E: Yılmaz Büyükerşen's personal exhibition

Some of the characters depicted are,: Mehmet II (1432–1481), Selim I (1470/1-1520), Süleyman I (1494–1566), Hürrem Sultan (1502/04-1558), Cengiz Topel (1934–1964), Sabiha Gökçen (1913–2001), Cüneyt Arkın (born 1937), Orhan Gencebay (born 1944), Hulusi Kentmen (1912–1993), Barış Manço (1943–1999), Kemal Sunal (1944–2000), Yunus Emre (1238–1320), Battal Gazi (690/5-740), Nasrettin Hoca (13th century), İlber Ortaylı (born 1947), Hıfzı Topuz (born 1923), Ataol Behramoğlu (born 1942), Emin Çölaşan (born 1942), Beyazıt Öztürk (born 1969), İlyas Salman (born 1949), Adile Naşit (1930–1987), Adnan Menderes (1899–1961), Turgut Özal (1927–1993).

== Gallery ==
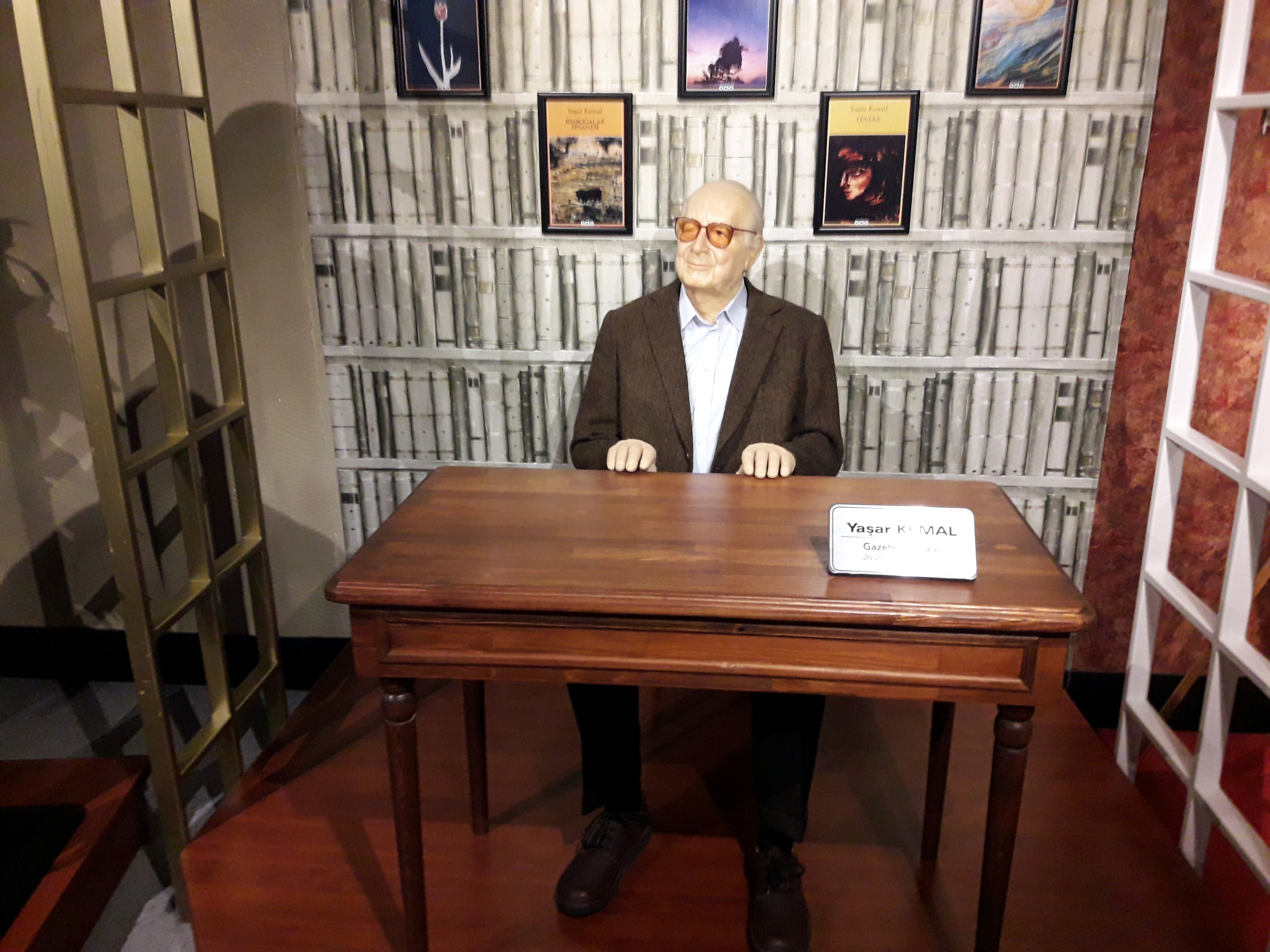
Yaşar Kemal

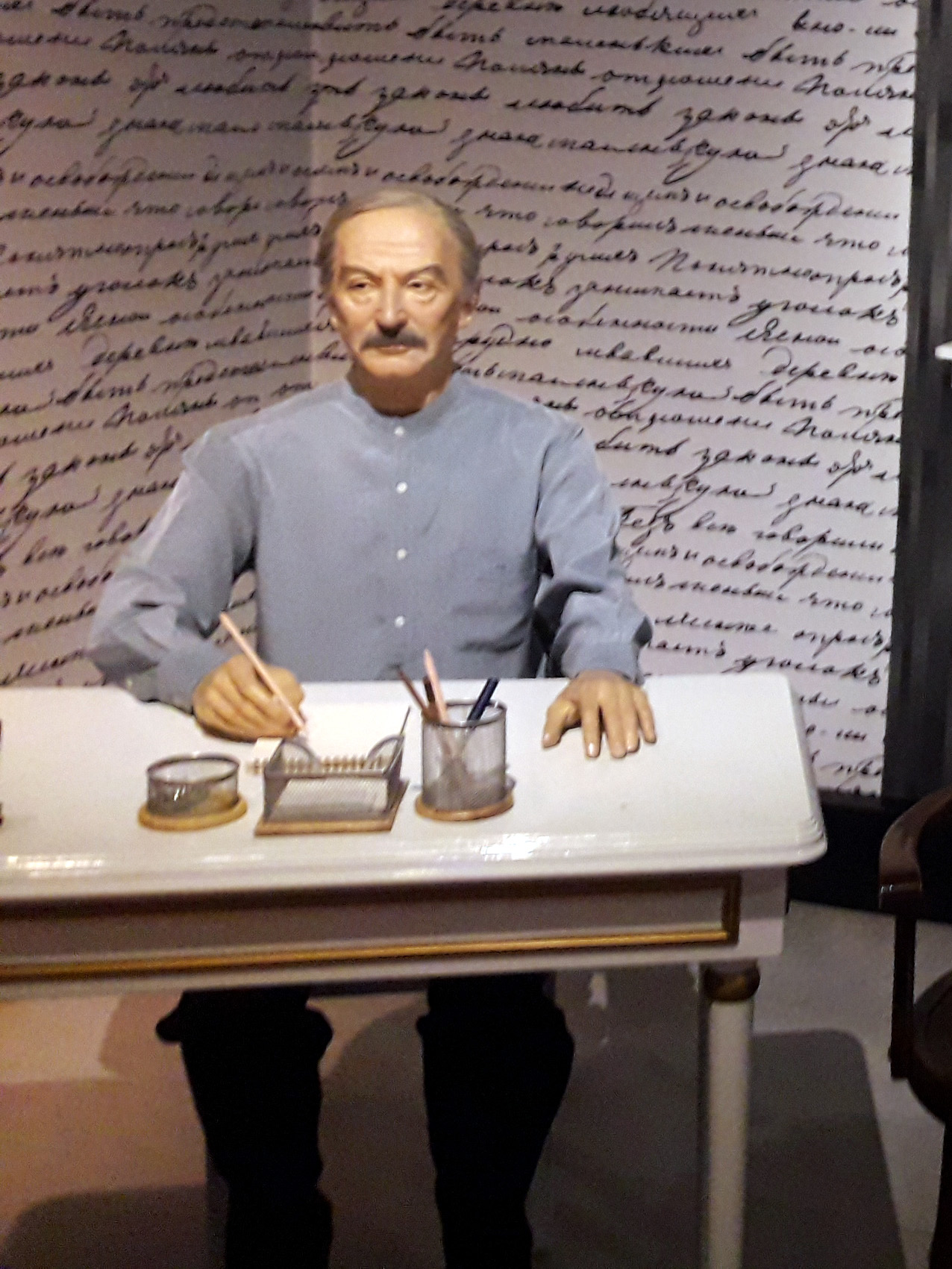
İlhan Selçuk

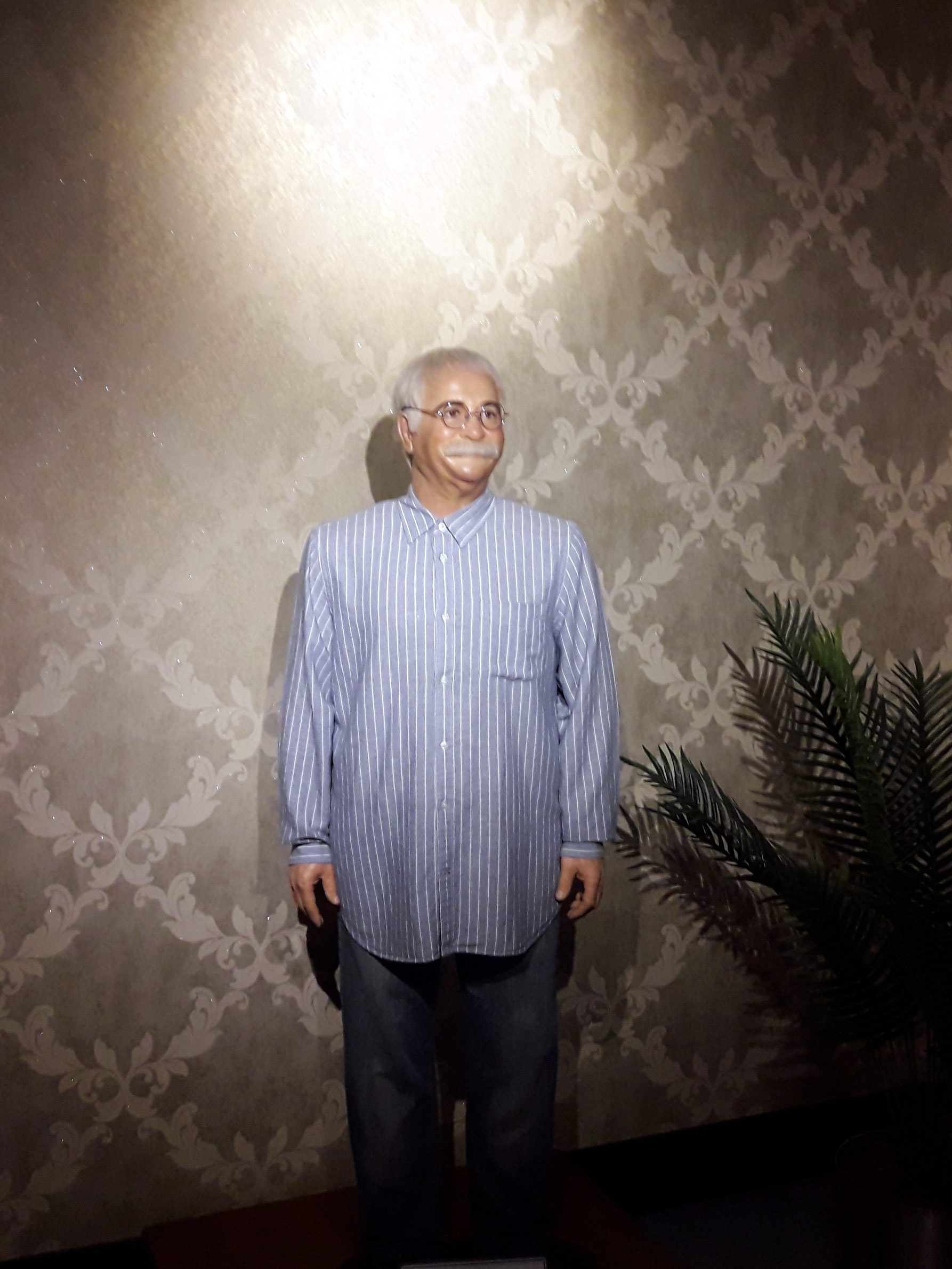
Levent Kırca

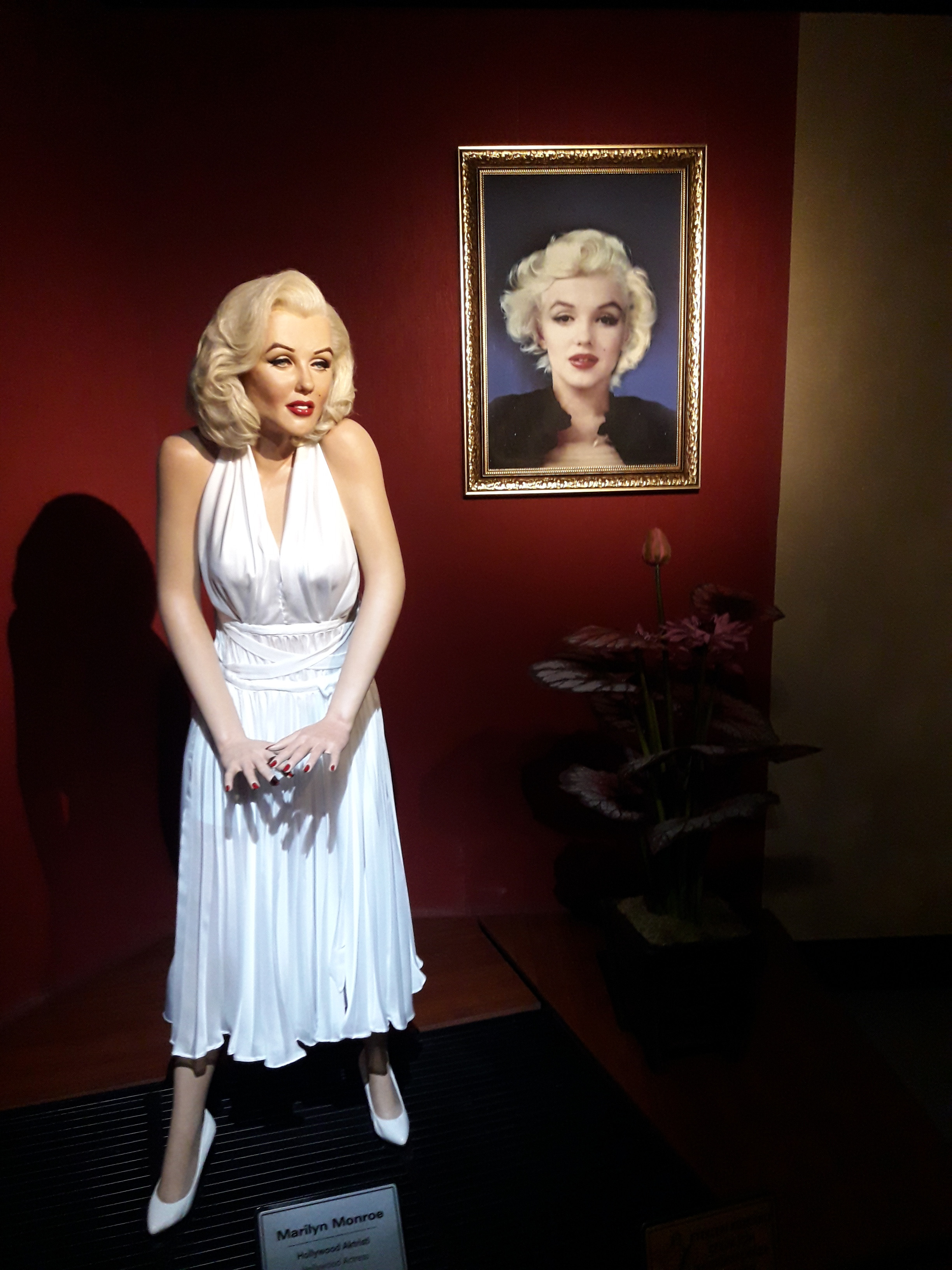
Marilyn Monroe
