= Innovation Party (Turkey) =

Political party in Turkey

Innovation Party Yenilik Partisi
- Abbreviation: YP
- Leader: Öztürk Yılmaz
- General Secretary: Esra Altun Şallı
- Founder: Öztürk Yılmaz
- Founded: 20 July 2020
- Split from: Republican People's Party
- Headquarters: Çankaya, Ankara
- Membership (2026): ▲7,043
- Ideology: Kemalism; Social democracy; Libertarianism; Secularism; Modernism
- Political position: Center to Center-left
- Colors: Blue; Red
- Slogan: Türkiye'ye Yenilik Gelecek ("Innovation will come to Turkey")

Website
- yenilikpartisi.org.tr

The Innovation Party (Turkish: Yenilik Partisi, YP) is a Turkish political party founded under the leadership of Öztürk Yılmaz, also currently serving as its chairman, on 20 July 2020.

== History ==
=== Formation ===
The party founder is Öztürk Yılmaz, who was a member of parliament for the CHP in both 2015 and 2018, who was expelled from the party on 20 November 2018 when he demanded that the adhān (call to prayer) should be in Turkish instead of Arabic. Another reason for his expulsion from the party were statements against the party leader Kemal Kılıçdaroğlu. In 2019 he then announced that he wanted to found his own party. Since its foundation in July 2020 and until May 2023, the party had, with Yılmaz, a seat in the Turkish National Assembly.
