= Türkmentokat, Odunpazarı =

Türkmentokat
- Neighbourhood
- Location in Turkey Türkmentokat (Turkey Central Anatolia)
- Coordinates: 39°40′N 30°47′E
- Country: Turkey
- Province: Eskişehir
- District: Odunpazarı
- Population (2022): 291
- Time zone: UTC+3 (TRT)
- Postal code: 26004
- Area code: 0222

Türkmentokat is a neighbourhood of the municipality and district of Odunpazarı, Eskişehir Province, Turkey. Its population is 291 (2022).

The Battle of Dumlupınar was fought in this area. It is 20 km from Eskişehir city center.
