= Cacabey Medrese =

Madrasa in Kırşehir, Turkey

- Cacabey Medresesi
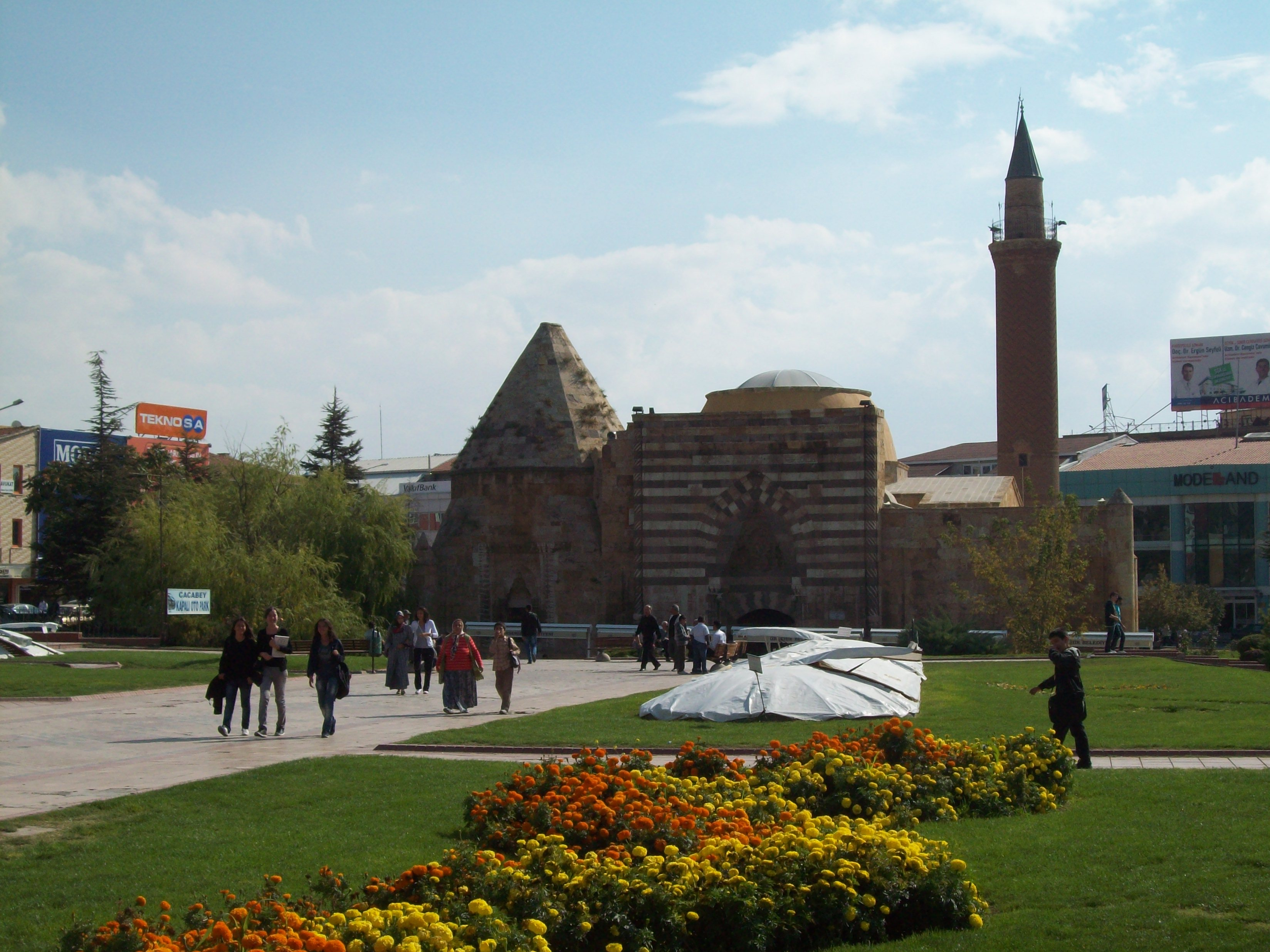
- Interactive map of the Cacabey Medrese area

General information
- Type: Madrasa
- Architectural style: Seljuk architecture
- Location: Kırşehir, Turkey
- Coordinates: 39.1467°N 34.1606°E
- Completed: 1272–1273

Cacabey Medrese (Turkish: Cacabey Medresesi) is a historic Seljuk-era madrasa located in Kırşehir, Turkey. Built between 1272 and 1273 during the reign of the Anatolian Seljuk Sultanate, it originally functioned as an astronomical observatory and educational institution. Today, it serves as a mosque and is one of the most prominent landmarks in central Anatolia.

Cacabey Medrese, one of the Anatolian Seljuk madrasahs, was added to the UNESCO World Heritage Tentative List in 2014.

== History ==
Cacabey Medrese was commissioned by Nur al-Din ibn Jaja, the Seljuk governor of Kırşehir, who was a prominent statesman and patron of science and education. The building was completed in 1272–1273 (Hijri 671) during a period of intellectual and scientific activity in the Seljuk realm. It was particularly dedicated to the teaching of astronomy, making it one of the earliest examples of an observatory-integrated educational complex in the Islamic world.

== Architecture ==
The madrasa exemplifies the stone masonry and ornamental features of Seljuk architecture. The structure consists of a rectangular courtyard surrounded by classrooms and student cells. The portal is richly decorated with muqarnas and geometric carvings. One of its most distinctive features is the minaret and the dome structure which is believed to have served astronomical purposes, such as observing celestial bodies through strategically placed openings.

== Observatory function ==
What sets Cacabey Medrese apart from many other madrasas is its integration of an observatory within the building's layout. Several architectural elements, such as the cylindrical tower and dome, suggest that it was used for sky observations. The Seljuks were known for their interest in astronomy, and this structure reflects the scientific curiosity of the time.

== Modern use ==
In later centuries, the madrasa ceased its educational function and was converted into a mosque. It was restored multiple times, particularly during the Republican era. Today, Cacabey Medrese functions as a mosque and remains open to visitors as a cultural heritage site. It is listed as a protected monument by the Turkish Ministry of Culture and Tourism.

== See also ==
- Astronomy in the medieval Islamic world
