= Edirne (electoral district) =

Electoral district for the Grand National Assembly of Turkey

Coordinates: 37°50′N 34°45′E

- electoral district for the Grand National Assembly of Turkey
- Edirne shown within Turkey
- Province: Edirne
- Electorate: 300,609

Current electoral district
- Created: 1923
- Seats: 4 Historical: 3 (2007–2023)
- Turnout at last election: 89.40%
- Representation
- CHP: 2 / 4
- AK Party: 1 / 4
- İYİ: 1 / 4

Edirne is an electoral district of the Grand National Assembly of Turkey. It elects three members of parliament (deputies) to represent the province of the same name for a four-year term by the D'Hondt method, a party-list proportional representation system.

== Members ==
Population reviews of each electoral district are conducted before each general election, which can lead to certain districts being granted a smaller or greater number of parliamentary seats. Edirne's seats were reduced from four to three in 2011.

MPs for Edirne, 2002 onwards
Election	2002 (22nd Parliament)	2007 (23rd Parliament)	2011 (24th Parliament)	June 2015 (25th Parliament)	November 2015 (26th Parliament)
MP	Necdet Budak; CHP	Bilgin Paçarız; CHP	Kemal Değermendereli; CHP	Erdin Bircan; CHP	
MP	Rasim Çakır; CHP		Recep Gürkan; CHP	Okan Gaytancıoğlu; CHP	
MP	Nejat Gencan; CHP	Necdet Budak; AK Party	Mehmet Müezzinoğlu; AK Party	Şemsettin Emir; AK Party	Rafet Sezen; AK Party
MP	Ali Ayağ; AK Party	Cemalettin Uslu; MHP	No seat		

== General elections ==
=== 2011 ===
2011 general election: Edirne
Party	Candidate	Votes	%	±%
CHP	2 elected 0: 1. Recep Gürkan ✓; 2. Kemal Değirmendereli ✓; 3. Abdülbaki Topal ✗	136,532	51.70	▲15.87
AK Party	1 elected 0: 1. Mehmet Müezzinoğlu ✓; 2. Tuna Bekleviç ✗; 3. Fatma Aksal ✗	80,251	30.40	▲9.68
MHP	None elected ▼1: 1. Cemaleddin Uslu ✗; 2. Gürsel Şimşek ✗; 3. Doğuş Şimşek ✗	35,152	13.31	▼3.52
DP	None elected: 1. Nurhayat Bozkurt ✗; 2. Recep Seçkin Onal ✗; 3. Yavuz Güngör ✗	2,486	0.94	▼8.63
SAADET	None elected: 1. Ali Erhan Demirkıran ✗; 2. Mustafa Kabakçılı ✗; 3. Sinan Tekin ✗	2,417	0.92	▼0.73
HEPAR	None elected: 1. Ahmet Eren Çorbacı ✗; 2. Talip Aydın ✗; 3. Murat Aygün ✗	1,381	0.52	▲0.52
DSP	None elected: 1. Hüseyin Saygı ✗; 2. Kemal Gözübrek ✗; 3. Hayri İdin ✗	1,188	0.45	N/A
HAS Party	None elected: 1. Cemil Çıvan ✗; 2. Mehmet Çolakkol ✗; 3. İbrahim İmamoğlu ✗	1,084	0.41	▲0.41
Labour	None elected: 1. Fevzi Ayber ✗; 2. Hayri Arı ✗; 3. Namık Türkmen ✗	1,050	0.40	▲0.17
DYP	None elected: 1. Zeynep Meltem Güngenci ✗; 2. Hediye Kalem Güler ✗; 3. Yeşim Doğanay ✗	680	0.26	▲0.26
TKP	None elected: 1. Kenan Doğan ✗; 2. İrfan Tunca ✗; 3. Sedat Zımba ✗	430	0.16	▲0.01
Büyük Birlik	None elected: 1. arif Köroğlu ✗; 2. Recep Mermer ✗; 3. Sezgin Merdan ✗	407	0.15	▲0.15
MP	None elected: 1. Necmi Yalın ✗; 2. Yusuf Çetin ✗; 3. Aynur Şentürk ✗	351	0.13	▲0.13
Independent	None elected: Mehmet Saygın Turan ✗	286	0.11	▼0.22
Nationalist Conservative	None elected: 1. Hayri Dirik ✗; 2. Recai Kocatürk ✗; 3. Tevfik Kalemci ✗	267	0.10	▲0.10
Liberal Democrat	None elected: 1. Mahmut Metin Göktürk ✗; 2. Cemal Tanık ✗; 3. Hayrullah Ergün Koç ✗	144	0.05	▲0.05
Total votes		264,106	100.00	
Rejected ballots		4,651	1.73	▲0.78
Turnout		268,747	89.40	▲1.39

=== June 2015 ===
Abbr.	Party	Votes	%
CHP	Republican People's Party	140,848	53.8%
AK Party	Justice and Development Party	63,381	24.2%
MHP	Nationalist Movement Party	41,316	15.8%
HDP	Peoples' Democratic Party	6,955	2.7%
	Other	9,470	3.6%
Total		261,970	
Turnout		87.72%	
source: YSK

=== November 2015 ===
Abbr.	Party	Votes	%
CHP	Republican People's Party	149,278	57%
AK Party	Justice and Development Party	70,648	27%
MHP	Nationalist Movement Party	27,966	10.7%
HDP	Peoples' Democratic Party	5,405	2.1%
	Other	8,595	3.3%
Total		261,892	
Turnout		87.12%	
source: YSK

=== 2018 ===
Abbr.	Party	Votes	%
CHP	Republican People's Party	123,252	46%
AK Party	Justice and Development Party	73,630	27.5%
IYI	Good Party	42,614	15.9%
MHP	Nationalist Movement Party	13,104	4.9%
HDP	Peoples' Democratic Party	8,744	3.3%
	Other	6,733	2.5%
Total		268,077	
Turnout		88.59%	
source: YSK

== Presidential elections ==
=== 2014 ===
2014 presidential election: Edirne
Party	Candidate	Votes	%
Independent	Ekmeleddin İhsanoğlu	156,959	64.96
AK Party	Recep Tayyip Erdoğan	77,768	32.18
HDP	Selahattin Demirtaş	6,913	2.86
Total votes		241,640	100.00
Rejected ballots		4,465	1.81
Turnout		246,105	81.08
Ekmeleddin İhsanoğlu win			
