= Strong Turkey Party =

Political party in Turkey

Strong Turkey Party (Turkish: Güçlü Türkiye Partisi, GTP) is a political party in Turkey and headed by Tuna Beklevic. It was founded on 9 October 2006.
