= Museum of Modern Glass Art, Eskişehir =

Museum in Eskişehir, Turkey

Museum of Modern Glass Art
- Çağdaş Cam Sanatları Müzesi
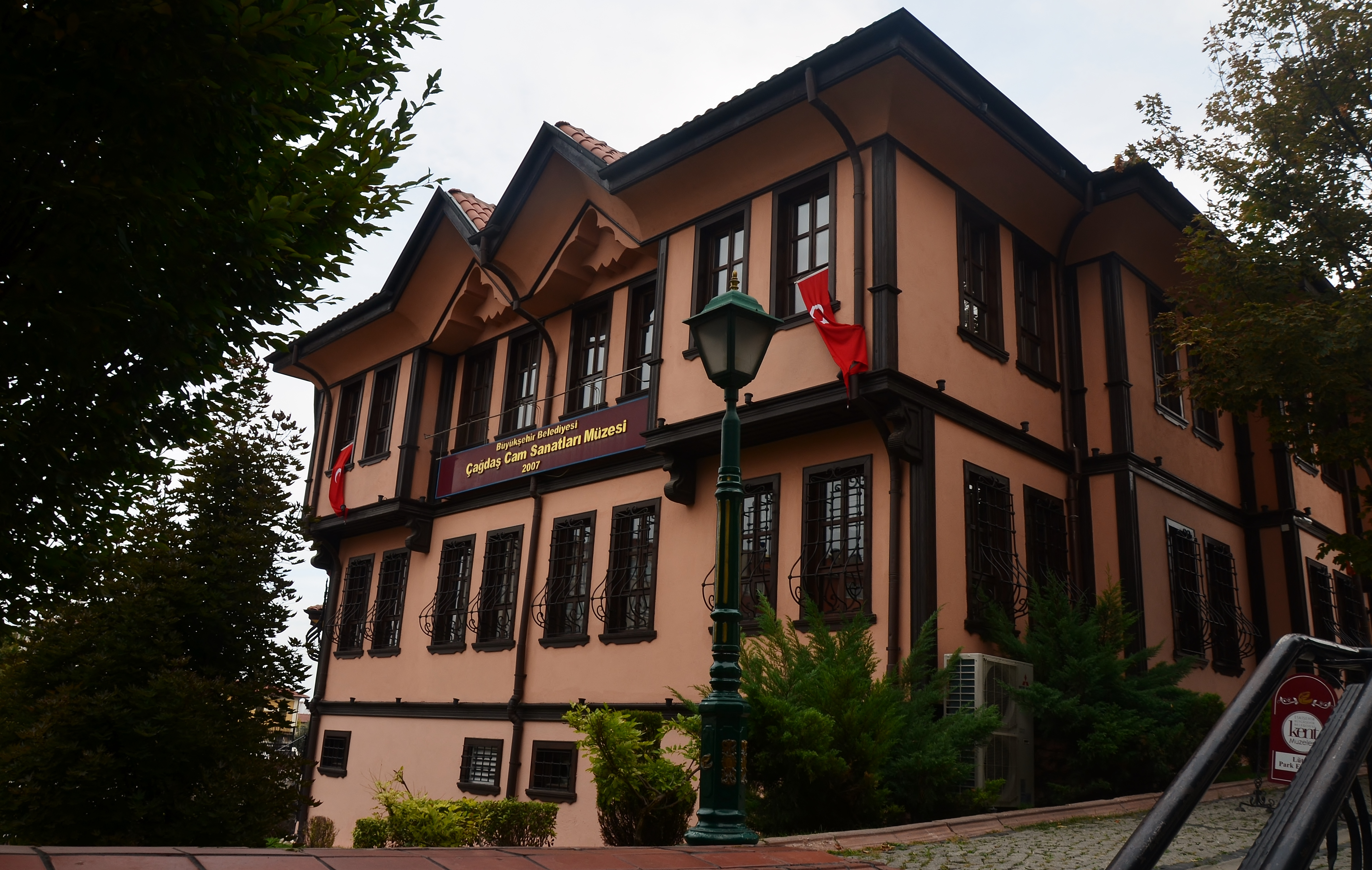
- Museum of Modern Glass Art in Odunpazarı, Eskişehir, Turkey.

- Location of the museum in Turkey.
- Established: December 1, 2007; 18 years ago
- Location: Odunpazarı, Eskişehir, Turkey
- Coordinates: 39°45′54″N 30°31′19″E
- Type: Modern art, glass art
- Founders: Eskişehir Metropolitan Municipality, Anadolu University, Friends of Glass Group
- Owner: Eskişehir Metropolitan Municipality

Museum of Modern Glass Art is a museum dedicated to contemporary glass art in Odunpazarı, Eskişehir, Turkey.

The museum was established with the cooperation of Eskişehir Metropolitan Municipality, Anadolu University and Friends of Glass Group in 2007. It was created through the renovation of three historical houses. It is Turkey's first museum of its kind.

== Exhibits ==
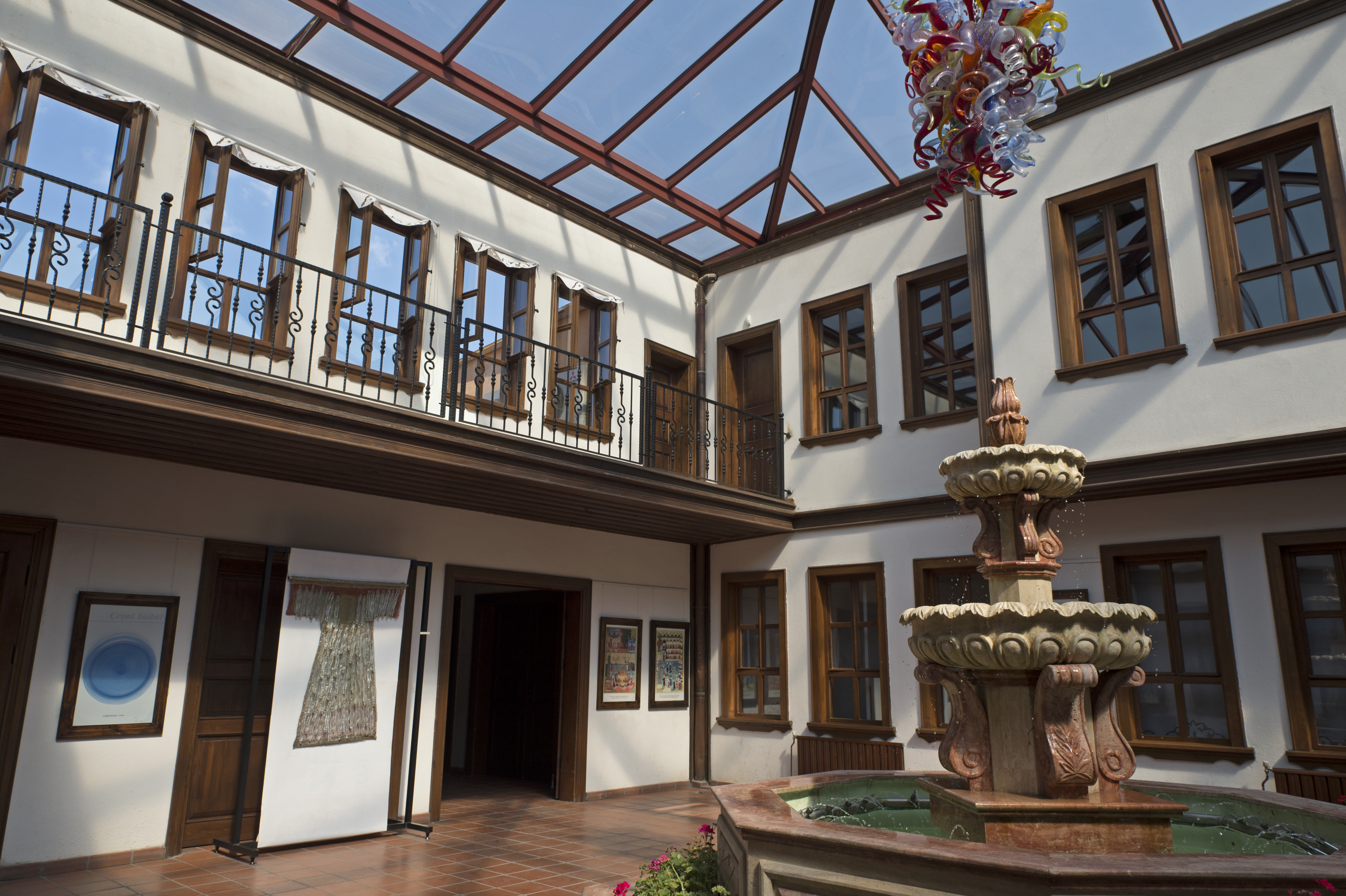
Courtyard hung with a glass sculpture by Dale Chihuly

The museum exhibits works of 58 domestic and 10 foreign artists. It has 125 works by these artists demonstrating a range of techniques for their production. Works donated by Japanese, Polish, Latvian and German artists are also on display at the museum.

The exhibits are displayed in a series of rooms arranged around a central courtyard over two floors. Two of galleries are used for permanent displays, while another is used for temporary exhibition of works by young artists. In addition to the glass exhibits, it also has a glass workshop and a theatre hall. A library and archive centre is also planned for the museum.
