= Alaeddin Mosque (Eskişehir) =

Mosque in Eskişehir, Turkey

- Alaeddin Camii
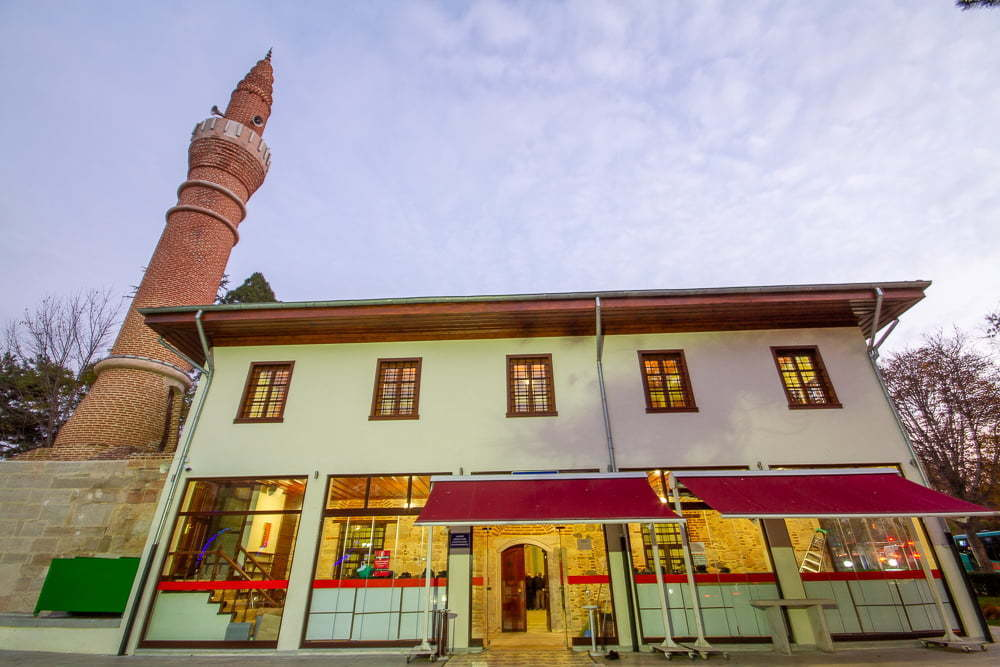

- Location of the mosque in Turkey.

Religion
- Affiliation: Islam
- District: Odunpazarı
- Province: Eskişehir

Location
- Country: Turkey
- Interactive map of Alaeddin Mosque
- Coordinates: 39°46′00″N 30°31′26″E

Architecture
- Funded by: Nur al-Din ibn Jaja
- Established: 1267

Specifications
- Dome dia. (inner): 6.50 m (21.3 ft)
- Minaret: 1
- Materials: Rubble masonry, wood

Alaeddin Mosque, also known as Alaaddin Mosque (Turkish: Alaeddin Camii or Alaaddin Camii) is a historic mosque in Odunpazarı district of Eskişehir Province, Turkey.

Alaeddin Mosque is situated in Alaeddin Park at Odunpazarı, Eskişehir. According to an inscription at the base of its minaret, it was built in 1267, during the reign of Seljuq Sultan of Rûm Gıyaseddin Keyhüsrev III (reigned 1265–1284). It was donated by Nur al-Din ibn Jaja, a follower of Mevlana. It is so one of the oldest buildings in Eskişehir.

The almost-quadratic rectangular-plan mosque is constructed in rubble masonry. An octagonal 6.50 m (21.3 ft)-diameter dome sits in the middle of the flat wooden roof. Entrance to the mosque is at the northern side. A wooden staircase leads to the women's section in the upper floor. The dome's interior is adorned with Quran verses at its border. The mihrab is placed in a niche in the south of the mosque, and features late Ottoman architectural style. The mosque is brightened by big rectangular windows. Two-level window layout is applied at the north and lateral facades, at the women's section and the narthex.

The building completely lost its original construction properties after several restorations. A major alteration took place in 1945. The mosque was closed to worship by a cabinet decree, and was used as an archaeological museum until the establishment of the Eskişehir Eti Archaeology Museum. The mosque was restored lately in 2014.
