= Tayfun Talipoğlu Typewriter Museum =

Turkish museum

- Tayfun Talipoğlu Daktilo Müzesi
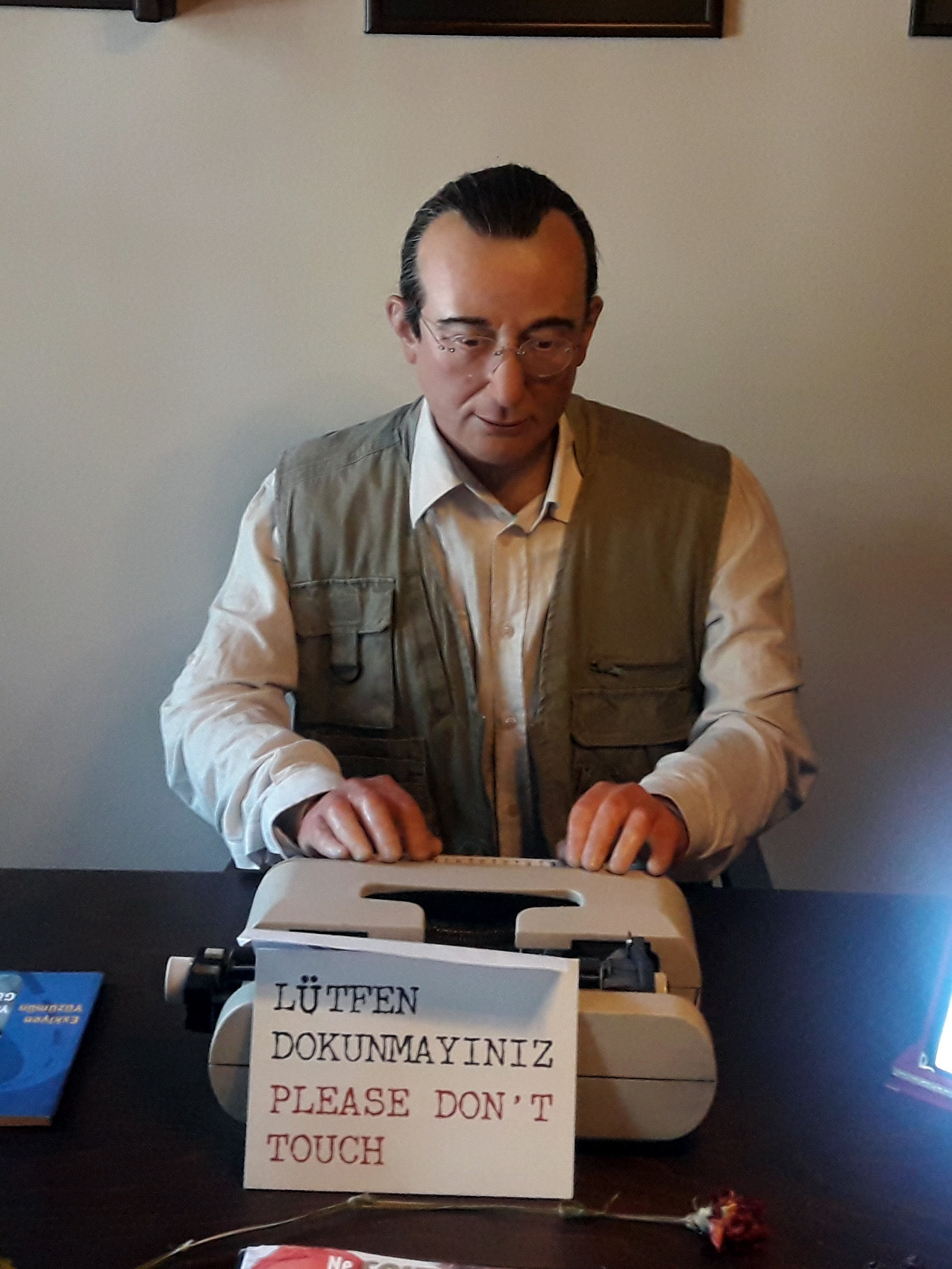
- Tayfun Talipoğlu wax sculpture in the typewriter museum

- Location of the museum in Turkey.
- Established: May 15, 2016; 10 years ago
- Location: Odunpazarı, Eskişehir, Turkey
- Coordinates: 39°45′44″N 30°31′29″E
- Type: Technology
- Collections: more than 50 typewriters
- Founder: Odunpazarı Municipality
- Owner: Odunpazarı Municipality

Tayfun Talipoğlu Typewriter Museum, or shortly Typewriter Museum, (Turkish: Tayfun Talipoğlu Daktilo Müzesi or Daktilo Müzesi) is a technology museum in Odunpazarı, Eskişehir, Turkey exhibiting typewriters.

The Typewriter Museum is the first one of its kind in Turkey. Owned and operated by Odunpazarı Municipality, the museum is situated in the historic Şamlıoğlu Mansion. Inaugurated on May 15, 2016, it is named for the journalist and television producer Tayfun Talipoğlu, who donated a number of typewriters he used. A wax sculpture of him is in the museum. There is also a wax sculpture of the former prime minister Bülent Ecevit (1925–2006) typing on his typewriter, who worked for Turkey's press attaché in London, England. More than fifty typewriters of various makes and models are on display, including products of manufacturers like Olivetti, Remington Rand, Halda, Brother Industries, Alpina and Facit.

The museum is open every day from 10:00 to 17:00 hours local time, but Mondays.
