= Eskişehir Meerschaum Museum =

Museum in Odunpazarı District, Turkey

- Lületaşı Müzesi
- Location of the museum in Turkey.
- Established: 2008; 18 years ago
- Location: Odunpazarı, Eskişehir, Turkey
- Coordinates: 39°45′46″N 30°31′29″E
- Type: Handicraft
- Collections: Meerschaum pipes
- Collection size: 400
- Founder: Odunpazarı Municipality

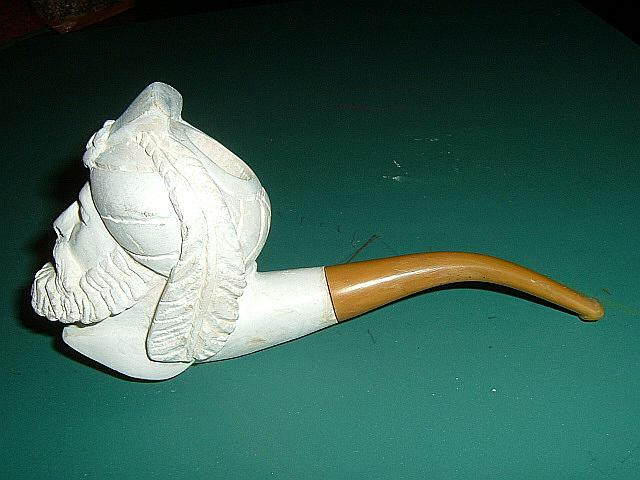
An unused meerschaum pipe.

Eskişehir Meerschaum Museum (Turkish: Lületaşı Müzesi) is a handicraft museum in Odunpazarı district of Eskişehir, Turkey, exhibiting various items handmade of sepiolite (Meerschaum).

Sepiolite or Meerschaum is a soft white clay mineral, which is mainly used to handicraft tobacco pipes called Meerschaum pipes. The opaque and off-white, grey or cream colored mineral is soft when extracted. However, it hardens on exposure to solar heat or when dried in a warm place. This feature allows it to give a permanent shape after carving it at soft state. Meerschaum deposits are found in Eskişehir region, generally at first rank in the world, in depths up to 150 m (490 ft).

The exhibited items of the museum were collected by Eskişehir Governorship during the International Meerschaum Festival, Meerschaum handicraft competitions and exhibits held in Eskişehir since 1998. Around 400 items handmade by 60 artisans were left to Odunpazarı Municipality. The museum was established by Odunpazarı Municipality inside the Kurşunlu Complex at Odunpazarı as the world's only in its kind in 2008.
