= Öztürk Yılmaz =

Turkish diplomat and politician

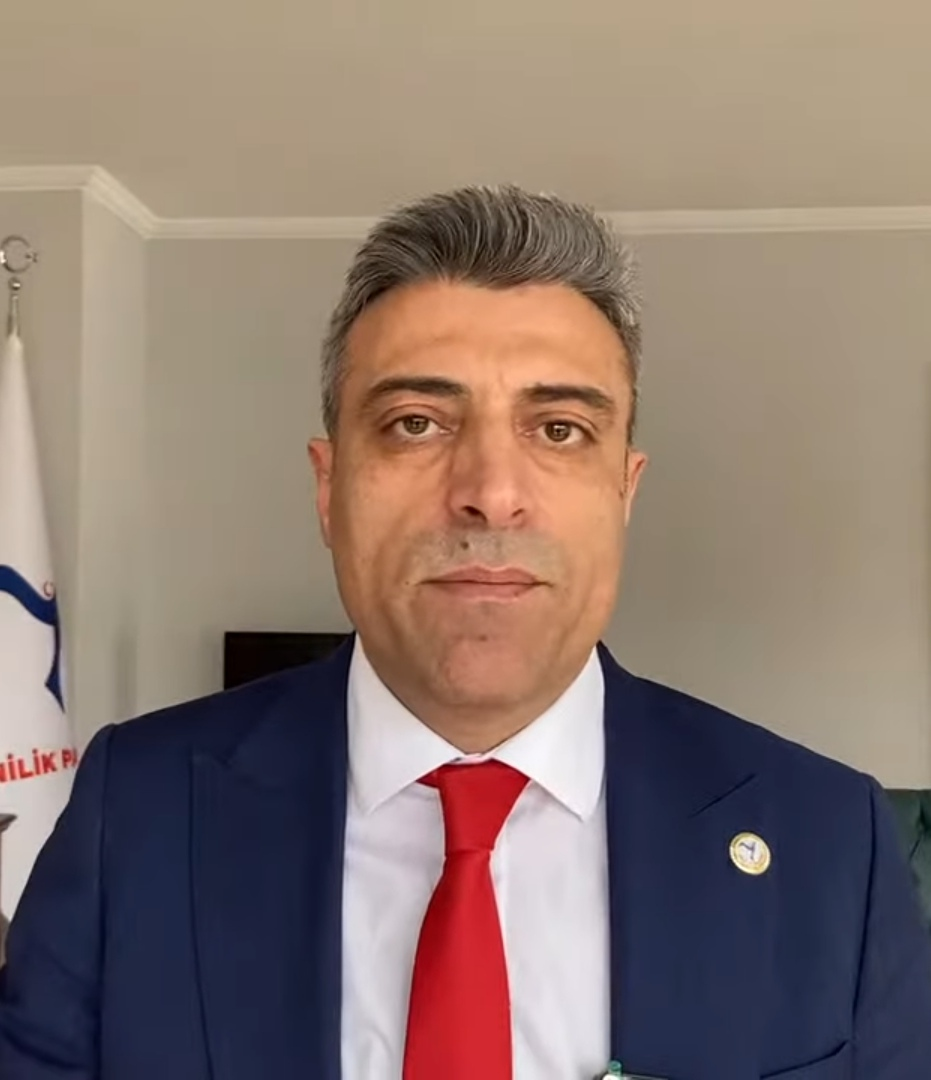

Deputy Leader of the Republican People's Party
- In office 25 January 2016 – 20 November 2018
- Leader: Kemal Kılıçdaroğlu

Member of the Grand National Assembly
- In office 1 November 2015 – 14 May 2023
- Constituency: Ardahan (Nov 2015, 2018)

Personal details
- Born: 19 September 1970 (age 56) Ardahan, Turkey
- Party: Republican People's Party (2015-2018); Independent (2018-2020); Innovation Party(2020-present)
- Education: Middle East Technical University
- Occupation: Diplomat

Öztürk Yılmaz (born 1970) is a Turkish former diplomat and politician. Having served as the Turkish embassy secretary to Kyrgyzstan and Brazil, he was appointed as the Consul General of Turkey to Mosul in 2013. He was taken hostage in June 2014 and held for 101 days along with 48 other diplomats after Islamic State of Iraq and the Levant militants took over the city, being released under undisclosed circumstances by the Turkish National Intelligence Organisation (MİT) on 20 September 2014. He was elected as a Member of Parliament for the electoral district of Ardahan from the Republican People's Party (CHP) in November 2015 general election. In 2018, Yılmaz became an independent. In 2020, Yılmaz founded the Innovation Party.

== Early life and career ==
Öztürk Yılmaz was born in 1970 in Ardahan, completing his early education there before graduating from the Middle East Technical University (ODTÜ) Department of International Relations. He began working for the Ministry of Foreign Affairs in 1996, serving as a manager in the departments responsible for the Balkans, the Organization for Security and Co-operation in Europe, the Middle East, Central Asia and the Caucasus. He completed a master's degree in the Vrije Universiteit Brussel on the topic of European Union integration and development. He is married, has three children and can speak English, Russian and Portuguese.

== Diplomatic career ==
In his overseas diplomatic career, Yılmaz was first appointed as Secretary to the Turkish Ambasssy to Kyrgyzstan and later to Brazil. He also served as an Undersecretary to the Permanent Representation of Turkey to the European Union. On 13 July 2013, he was appointed as the Consul General of Turkey to Mosul, Iraq.

=== ISIL hostage crisis ===
While serving as the Consul General in Mosul while the city was under the occupation of Islamic State of Iraq and the Levant (ISIL) forces, Yılmaz and 48 other diplomatic staff and their family members were taken hostage by ISIL militants in June 2014. After 101 days and alleged negotiations between the government and ISIL, all 49 hostages were released and brought back to Turkey via Syria by the Turkish National Intelligence Organisation (MİT) in September 2014. The circumstances of their release was unspecified, though the government claimed that no operation had been carried out. Opposition politicians and journalists alleged that the government had paid a ransom to the militants to secure their release.

== Political career ==
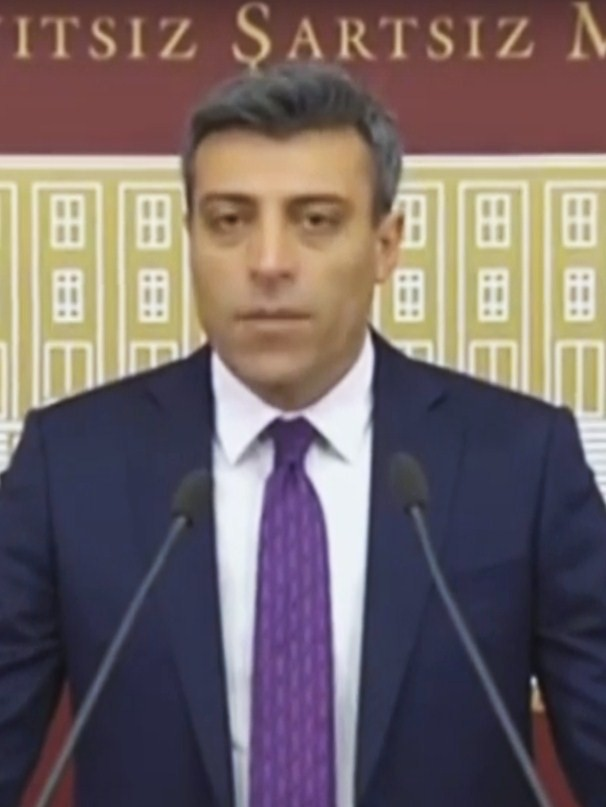
CHP MP Öztürk Yılmaz, 30 December 2016

Although he was appointed as the Ambassador to Tajikistan on 1 September 2015 after he was freed from ISIL, he resigned from this position two days later on 3 September to stand for Parliament in the upcoming November 2015 general election as a Republican People's Party (CHP) candidate. His party of choice came as a surprise to many commentators because of an image of Yılmaz hugging Prime Minister and Justice and Development Party (AKP) leader Ahmet Davutoğlu shortly after being released from captivity in 2014. He was fielded as the CHP's top candidate in his hometown, the electoral district of Ardahan and was elected on 1 November 2015. He has since criticised the Turkish government's decision to send troops to Mosul to train Kurdish fighters against ISIL, an incursion that had resulted in the souring of relations between Turkey and Iraq. He became deputy chairman of the CHP. He is a prominent critic of the military operation Olive Branch in Afrin. On January 25, he said the Free Syrian Army is in fact the al-Qaeda and Turkey should watch the origin of its allies. This led to a wave of detentions of critics of the operation Olive Branch.

== Innovation Party ==
In July 2020, Yılmaz founded the Innovation Party as a centrist Kemalist party.

== See also ==
- Iraq–Turkey relations
- Turkey–ISIL conflict
