= Ardahan (electoral district) =

Electoral district for the Grand National Assembly of Turkey

Coordinates: 37°50′N 34°45′E

- electoral district for the Grand National Assembly of Turkey
- Ardahan shown within Turkey
- Province: Ardahan
- Electorate: 69,160

Current electoral district
- Created: 1995
- Seats: 2
- Turnout at last election: 84.22%
- Representation
- AK Party: 1 / 2
- CHP: 1 / 2

Ardahan is an electoral district of the Grand National Assembly of Turkey. It elects two members of parliament (deputies) to represent the province of the same name for a four-year term by the D'Hondt method, a party-list proportional representation system.

== Members ==
Population reviews of each electoral district are conducted before each general election, which can lead to certain districts being granted a smaller or greater number of parliamentary seats. As one of the smallest electoral districts, Ardahan has consistently elected two MPs since 1999.

MPs for Ardahan, 2002 onwards
Election	2002 (22nd Parliament)	2007 (23rd Parliament)	2011 (24th Parliament)	June 2015 (25th Parliament)	November 2015 (26th Parliament)
MP	Kenan Altun; AK Party	Ertekin Çolak; AK Party	Orhan Atalay; AK Party		
MP	Ensar Öğüt; CHP	Metin Arifağaoğlu; CHP	Ensar Öğüt; CHP	Taşkın Aktaş; HDP	Öztürk Yılmaz; CHP

== General elections ==
=== 2011 ===
2011 general election: Ardahan
Party	Candidate	Votes	%	±%
AK Party	1 elected 0: 1. Orhan Atalay ✓; 2. Orhan Gökdemir ✗	22,831	40.22	▼0.38
CHP	1 elected 0: 1. Ensar Öğüt ✓; 2. Metin Demir ✗	17,476	30.78	▼1.51
Independent	None elected: Yüksel Avşar ✗ Süleyman Koç ✗	7,089	12.49	▲3.21
MHP	None elected: 1. Sebahattin Sarıçam ✗; 2. Övün Çabak ✗	5,651	9.95	▲3.87
Büyük Birlik	None elected: 1. Abdullah Topcu ✗; 2. Sinan Yıldırım ✗	1,666	2.93	▲2.93
DP	None elected: 1. Emin Üstün ✗; 2. Mehmet Baş ✗	439	0.77	▼2.42
DSP	None elected: 1. Fehim Gündüz ✗; 2. İbrahim Sayan ✗	395	0.70	N/A
HAS Party	None elected: 1. Ayhan Akay ✗; 2. Berkant Ezer ✗	309	0.54	▲0.54
SAADET	None elected: 1. Mevlüt Çalışkan ✗; 2. Fatih Yılmaz ✗	259	0.46	▼0.40
TKP	None elected: 1. Ulaş Erdoğan ✗; 2. Ayfer Aktemur ✗	197	0.35	▼1.07
MP	None elected: 1. Ayhan Uğurer ✗; 2. Rahim Aktaş ✗	186	0.33	▲0.33
DYP	None elected: 1. Ekrem Şahin ✗; 2. Ferhat Bindik ✗	128	0.23	▲0.23
Nationalist Conservative	None elected: 1. Zeyni Ejder ✗; 2. Zühal Kalkan ✗	101	0.18	▲0.18
Liberal Democrat	None elected: 1. Döndü İnaldır ✗; 2. Nihat Müştü ✗	45	0.08	▼0.11
HEPAR	No candidates	0	0.00	0.00
Labour	No candidates	0	0.00	0.00
Total votes		56,772	100.00	
Rejected ballots		1,631	2.80	▲1.73
Turnout		58,249	84.22	▲2.05

=== June 2015 ===
Abbr.	Party	Votes	%
HDP	Peoples' Democratic Party	17,096	30.4%
CHP	Republican People's Party	12,494	22.2%
AKP	Justice and Development Party	14,759	26.2%
MHP	Nationalist Movement Party	4,393	7.8%
SP	Felicity Party	561	1%
	Other	6,981	12.4%
Total		56,284	
Turnout		83.90	
source: YSK

=== November 2015 ===
Abbr.	Party	Votes	%
AKP	Justice and Development Party	19,916	36.5%
CHP	Republican People's Party	15,850	29%
HDP	Peoples' Democratic Party	12,113	22.2%
MHP	Nationalist Movement Party	4,857	8.9%
SP	Felicity Party	147	0.3%
	Other	1,713	3.1%
Total		54,596	
Turnout		81.07	
source: YSK

=== 2018 ===
Abbr.	Party	Votes	%
AKP	Justice and Development Party	20,431	36.1%
CHP	Republican People's Party	14,688	25.9%
HDP	Peoples' Democratic Party	13,358	23.6%
MHP	Nationalist Movement Party	3,746	6.6%
IYI	Good Party	2,900	5.1%
SP	Felicity Party	569	1%
	Other	982	1.7%
Total		56,674	
Turnout		84.81	
source: YSK

== Presidential elections ==
=== 2014 ===
2014 presidential election: Ardahan
Party	Candidate	Votes	%
AK Party	Recep Tayyip Erdoğan	20,567	40.69
Independent	Ekmeleddin İhsanoğlu	18,313	36.23
HDP	Selahattin Demirtaş	11,671	23.09
Total votes		50,551	100.00
Rejected ballots		1,122	2.17
Turnout		51,673	73.11
Recep Tayyip Erdoğan win			
