= Leaden Mosque and Complex =

Mosques in Eskişehir, Turkey

- Kurşunlu Camii ve Külliyesi
- The Lead Mosque between 2007 and 2011

- Location of Lead Mosque and Complex in Turkey

Religion
- Affiliation: Islam
- District: Odunpazarı
- Province: Eskişehir Province

Location
- Country: Turkey
- Coordinates: 39°45′46″N 30°31′31″E

Architecture
- Style: Ottoman
- Founder: Çoban Mustafa Pasha
- Completed: 1525

The Leaden Mosque and Complex (Turkish: Kurşunlu Camii ve Külliyesi) is a 16th-century Ottoman mosque and its social complex in Odunpazarı district of Eskişehir, Turkey.

== Mosque ==
The mosque and the complex were commissioned by the Ottoman vizier Çoban Mustafa Pasha, and were built between 1517 and 1525. Although the architect is unknown, it is believed that it was designed by Acem Ali, who was the head architect before Mimar Sinan (c. 1489/1490 – 1588). The mosque is named for its lead-covered (Turkish: Kurşunlu) dome. The mosque is a single-dome, quadratic-plan building having stone masonry walls. The inside of the dome is decorated with hand-carved figures. Marble columns and capitals support pointed-arches of the narthex in the architectural style of the classical period. The narthex is topped with five domes. The column capitals are decorated with muqarnas ornaments. To the mosque belong a shadirvan, a zawiya, a harem, an imaret, a mausoleum of Mevlevi Order sheikhs and two caravanserais.

== Social complex ==
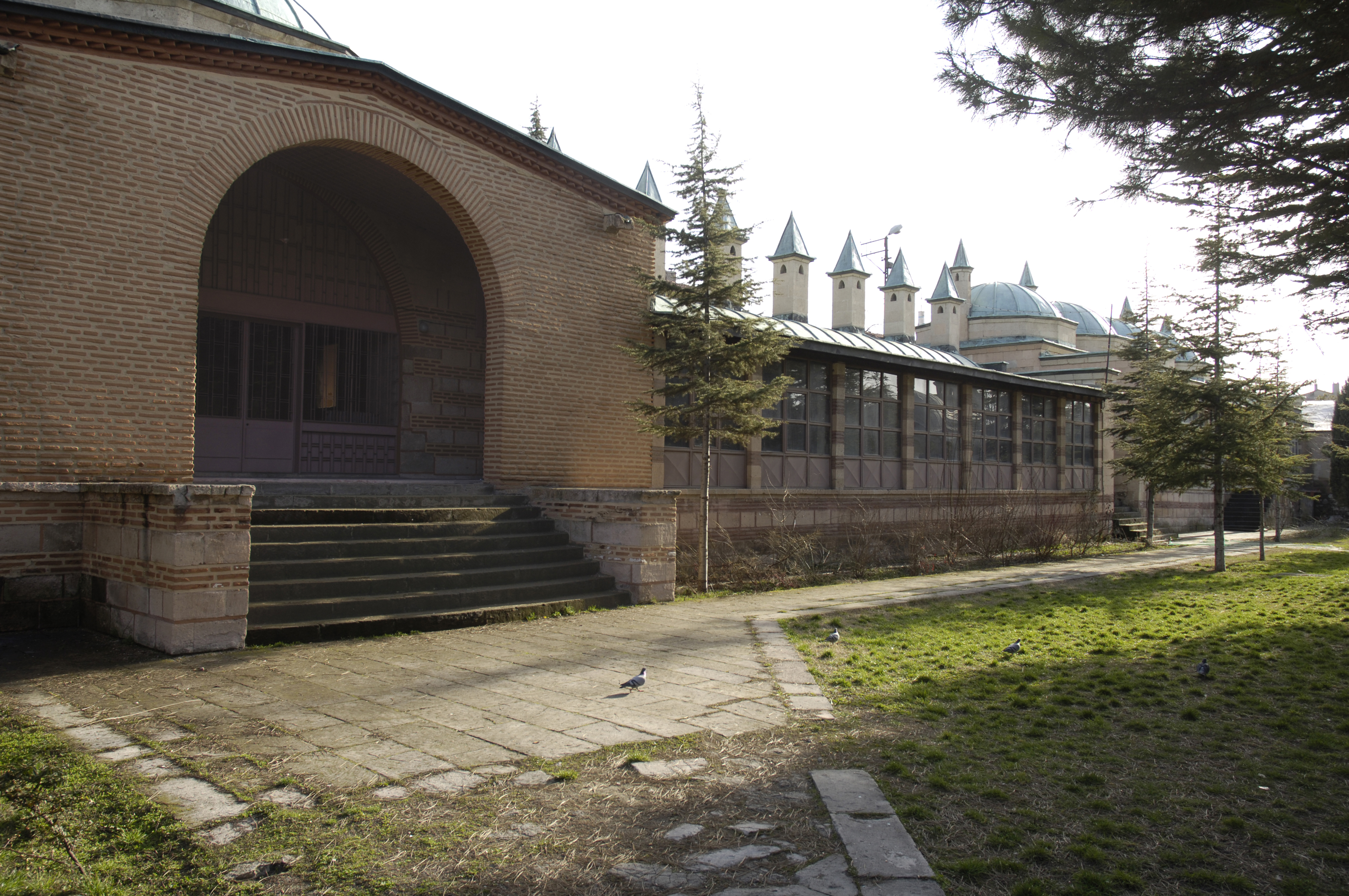
The entrance to the Meerschaum Museum in 2006

A building of social complex, having an inscription, is an annex to the mosque. It consists of seven sections. One of the sections is transformed into a market of arts in Eskişehir. Traditional Turkish arts handcrafted in the market, including primarily meerschaum craftsmanship, calligraphy, paper marbling, manuscript illumination, carpet weaving rugs and silver made crafts and embroidery, can be observed and art items can be acquired.

The Eskişehir Meerschaum Museum is situated inside the social complex across the art market. Access to the museum is free of charge. In the museum, handmade tobacco pipes made of meerschaum and meerschaum pipes are on display.
