= Haluk Pekşen =

Turkish politician and businessman (1961–2022)

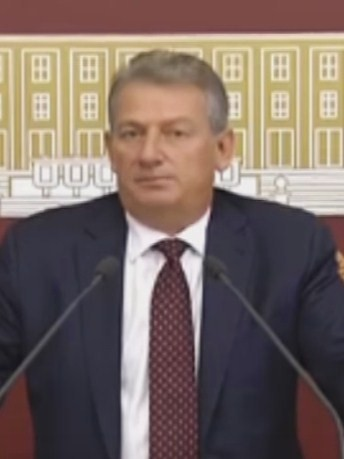

Member of the Grand National Assembly
- In office 7 June 2015 – 7 July 2018
- Constituency: Trabzon (June 2015, Nov 2015)

Personal details
- Born: 11 September 1961 Yokuşlu, Yomra, Trabzon, Turkey
- Died: 16 September 2022 (aged 61)
- Party: Republican People's Party (CHP)
- Spouse: Rukiye Pekşen
- Children: 2
- Education: Istanbul University
- Occupation: Politician, lawyer and businessman
- Profession: Law

Haluk Pekşen (11 September 1961 – 16 September 2022) was a Turkish lawyer, businessman and politician from the Republican People's Party (CHP) who served as the Member of Parliament for Trabzon since 7 June 2015.

Pekşen was lawyer at "Sledgehammer" plot trials and lawsuit for reestablishing of the Confederation of Progressive Trade Unions of Turkey. On September 16, 2022, after a fishbone got stuck in his esophagus, which caused a tear (rupture) in his esophagus, which caused an infection. He was buried in Cebeci Asri Cemetery after the funeral ceremony held in Ankara Kocatepe Mosque on September 18.

== See also ==
- 25th Parliament of Turkey
- 26th Parliament of Turkey
