= Tuna Bekleviç =

Turkish politician

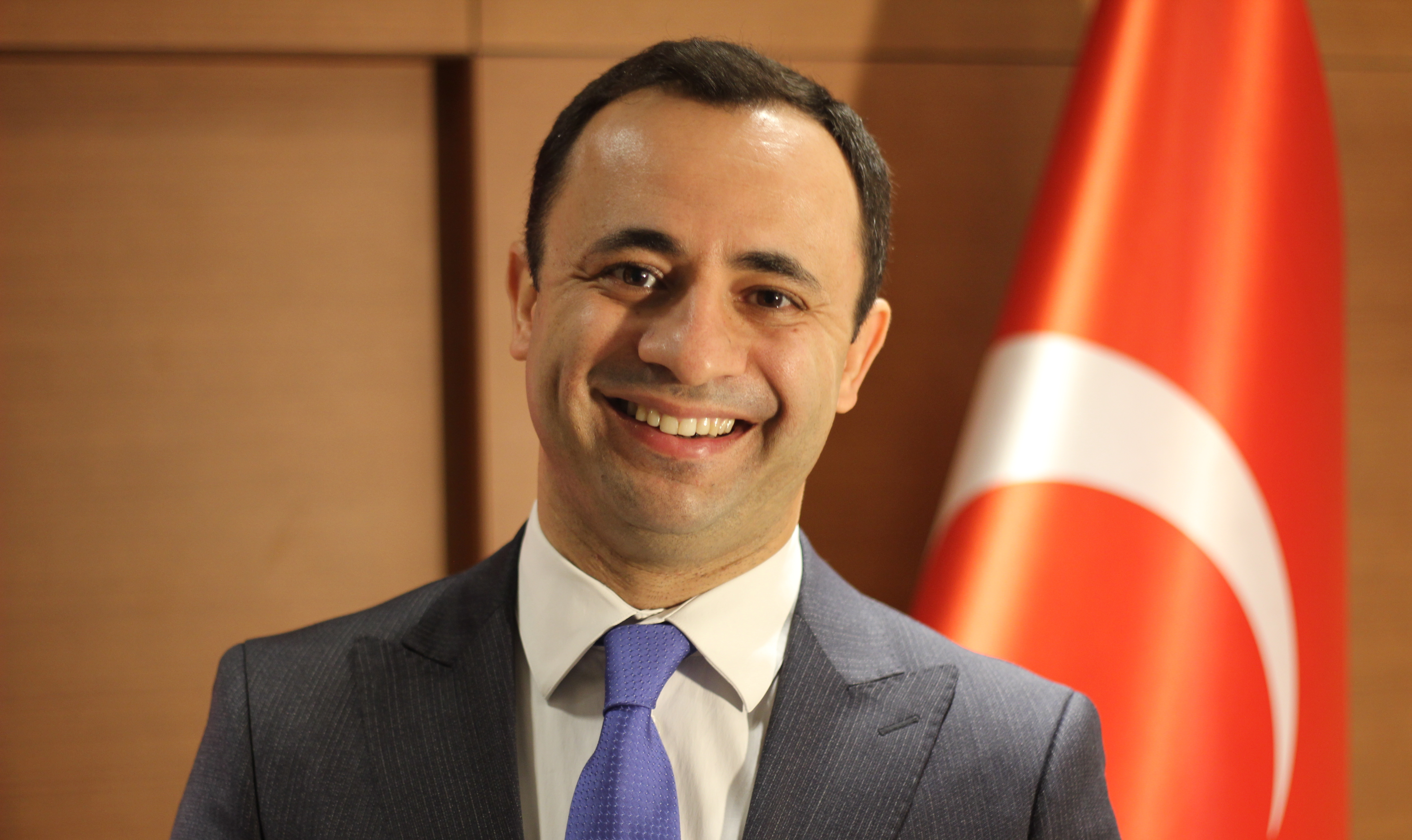

Independent candidate for Presidential Election in Turkey (2018)

Personal details
- Born: 23 January 1977 (age 49) Edirne, Turkey
- Party: Independent
- Spouse: Elif Bekleviç
- Children: 2
- Education: Istanbul Bilgi University, Economics (2002) Washington International Flight Academy, Pilot (2016)
- Occupation: Economist, politician

Tuna Bekleviç (born 23 January 1977) is a Turkish politician and activist. He rallied against the 2017 Referendum in Turkey, and was a candidate in the 2019 presidential election.

Bekleviç had to leave Turkey in 2019 following multiple anonymous threats and persecution by Turkey's authorities.

== Biography ==
Tuna Bekleviç was born in Edirne in 1977.

He is married to Elif Bekleviç and the couple has two children.

Bekleviç graduated from Istanbul Bilgi University School of Economics in 2002. He is a U.S. State Alumnus 2005 (US State Department IVLP Program) He worked as a columnist for the national daily newspaper “Türkiye” between 2009 and 2012.

== Public activism ==
Bekleviç was Chairman of Executive Board in Platform for Turkish Economists during 1999-2005 and Society and Democracy Association between 2004-2006. He was the founder and first chairman of İstanbul Bilgi University Alumni Association in 2005-2006. Bekleviç was the founding leader and Chairman of Guclu Türkiye Partisi (Strong Turkey Political Party) in 2006. The party opened branches in 33 cities but as a result of early elections, the party was unable to run in the 2007 Turkish general election. Tuna Bekleviç helped Erdogan in the 2008 Justice and Development Party closure trial.

Since 2007, Bekleviç has been the founding chairman of International Forum for Democracy and Peace (IFDP) and “Edirne Gönüllüleri.” The movement is based in Edirne, Turkey to mobilize youth participation in local policy. He made a speech in the Parliament of the United Kingdom, representing the IFDP.

In 2010, he established the Turkish-Armenian Friendship Society to mark the first anniversary of the signing of the Armenian-Turkish protocols in Zurich.

In the 2011 general election, he was nominated by the ruling AK Party in Edirne. That year he was appointed adviser to the European Minister (Ministry of European Union Affairs).

== March for Brotherhood ==
Tuna Beklevic walked for 1.058 kilometers from Ankara to the Kurdish majority town of Diyarbakir on the anniversary of the 2017 referendum. Aimed at bringing attention to the pain that the Kurdish population lives in the South Eastern part of Turkey, and the victims of the recent State of Emergency, Tuna walked for 27 days in this journey. In this journey, Tuna met with many civilians, artisans, visited homes and small villages, to listen to the everyday problems that people face. in the meantime early presidential elections were called and Tuna had to retrieve his presidential candidacy in order to finish this walk.

The people of Diyarbakir have organized a welcome for Tuna at the entrance of Diyarbakir, 4.7 km from the final destination of Dort Ayakli Minare in Sur Nevertheless, in this last part the police have intervened and have prevented the people to walk together with Tuna.

Originally from Edirne, during the whole journey Tuna Beklevic has tweeted in Kurdish, to bring more attention to the right of mother-tongue for the Kurdish population of Turkey.

Tuna Beklevic counted one millionth step in Suruc. There he laid down the flowers he had gathered during the whole journey in memoriam for the 34 youngsters who lost their life in Suruc.

== Political career and life in exile ==
After quitting the AK Party, Bekleviç founded the No Party which protested the 2017 referendum. The referendum asked citizens to approve or disapprove the constitutional amendment that altered the country's parliamentary system. Bekleviç opposes Turkey's Afrin operation in Syria

Prior to the referendum, Bekleviç was barred from holding rallies on the grounds that his party was not officially recognized. Even so, Bekleviç traveled around Turkey and used Facebook to hold a virtual rally that attracted close to 70,000 viewers.

Bekleviç declared that he would run for election on 26 September 2017 as an independent presidential candidate in the 2019 Turkish general elections. He announced his “100 steps within first 100 days" program, which includes a return to the parliamentary system, an immediate end to the state of emergency, respect for differences, and strengthening fundamental rights and freedoms. Bekleviç promised to bring the regime reform before the courts and restore the parliamentary system.

Due to his political activity in Turkey, Bekleviç had to flee the country to avoid repressions and imprisonment. The Telegraph also reported that Bekleviç and his family received multiple death and rape threats on Twitter after they left Turkey and re-settled in Washington DC.

== Published works ==
Bekleviç is the author of “Kağızman Modeli’’ published by İstanbul Bilgi University in 2004, “2023-Türkiye'de Bir Grup Genç Siyasetle İlgilenirse Ne Olur?” published by AGL Yayinlari in 2006, “Güçlü Türkiye” published in 2014.
