= Yılmaz Büyükerşen =

Turkish politician

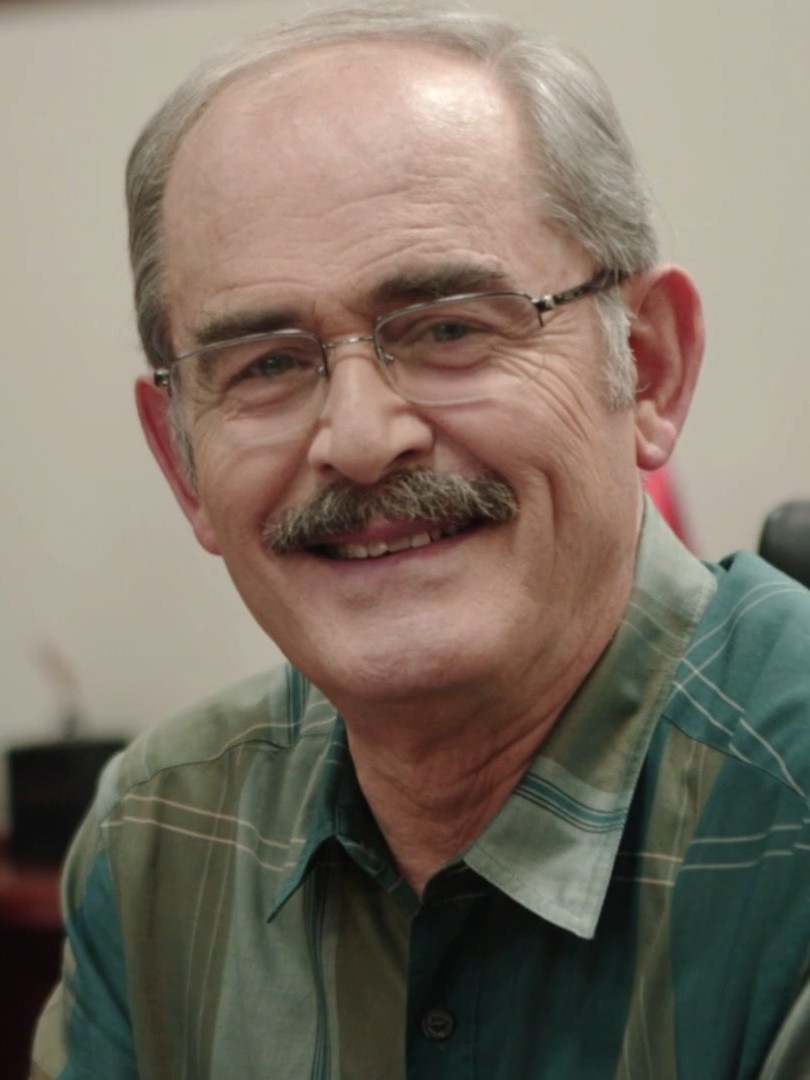

Mayor of Eskişehir
- In office 18 April 1999 – 3 April 2024
- Preceded by: Orhan Soydaş
- Succeeded by: Ayşe Ünlüce

Personal details
- Born: 8 November 1937 (age 88) Eskişehir, Turkey
- Party: Republican People's Party (2011–2026)
- Other political affiliations: Democratic Left Party (1999–2011)
- Spouse: Seyhan Büyükerşen
- Education: Anadolu University
- Awards: French Legion of Honour; Austrian Decoration for Science and Art

Yılmaz Büyükerşen (born 8 November 1937) is a Turkish politician, educator and former mayor of Eskişehir.

== Biography ==
Born to a Crimean Tatar father and Bulgarian immigrant mother. Büyükerşen graduated from the Eskişehir Academy of Economics and Commercial Sciences (later renamed Anadolu University) in 1962. During his academy years, he worked as a reporter, columnist, caricaturist and editor in various newspapers. With his friends from the academy, he established a chamber theatre and later a municipal theatre with funds raised by selling their blood to blood banks.

Following his graduation, he was offered an assistantship at the finance department of the academy. In 1966, he earned his PhD. In 1968, he became associate professor; and in 1973, he became professor. Also in 1973, he prepared a model for open universities in Turkey. In 1976, he was elected as chairman of the Eskişehir Academy of Economics and Commercial Sciences. In July 1998 he was awarded an honorary degree from the British Open University as Doctor of the University. He has also been awarded the Legion of Honour by former French President François Mitterrand, and the Austrian Decoration for Science and Art by former President Kurt Waldheim.

In 1982, with the new Law of Higher Education in Turkey, he was elected rector of Anadolu University by the president of Turkey. After his 5-year term ended, he was elected again in 1987 by President Turgut Özal. Besides this post, he served as a member of the Radio and Television High Council (RTÜK), and was elected to chairmanship of the organisation twice. In 1993, following new laws on RTÜK, his chairmanship ended.

He established the first school of cinema and television in Eskişehir. His focus has been on culture and literature, establishing faculties of literature, Communication Sciences, applied fine arts and also a state conservatory.

Büyükerşen is also the only professional wax sculptor in Turkey. The wax sculpture of Mustafa Kemal Atatürk in Anıtkabir Museum was designed and produced by Büyükerşen. His works are also displayed in the Yılmaz Büyükerşen Wax Museum in Eskişehir.

He is married, with two children and two grandchildren.

== Politics ==
In the 1999 Turkish local elections, he was elected as Mayor of Eskişehir from the Democratic Left Party (DSP), with 44% of the total vote. During his first term, he executed a series of "Urban Development Projects". He also started the construction of Estram, the electrified tram system in Eskişehir.

In the 2004 local elections, he was re-elected with 45% of votes, again with the Democratic Left Party (DSP). Due to his success and high popularity, he was then widely regarded by Turkish media as a possible future leader of the Turkish left.

He was elected for a third term in the 2009 elections. In January 2011, he left the DSP and joined the Republican People's Party (CHP) the following month.

In the 2014 local elections, he was re-elected with 45% of the vote.
