= Odunpazarı =

- District and municipality
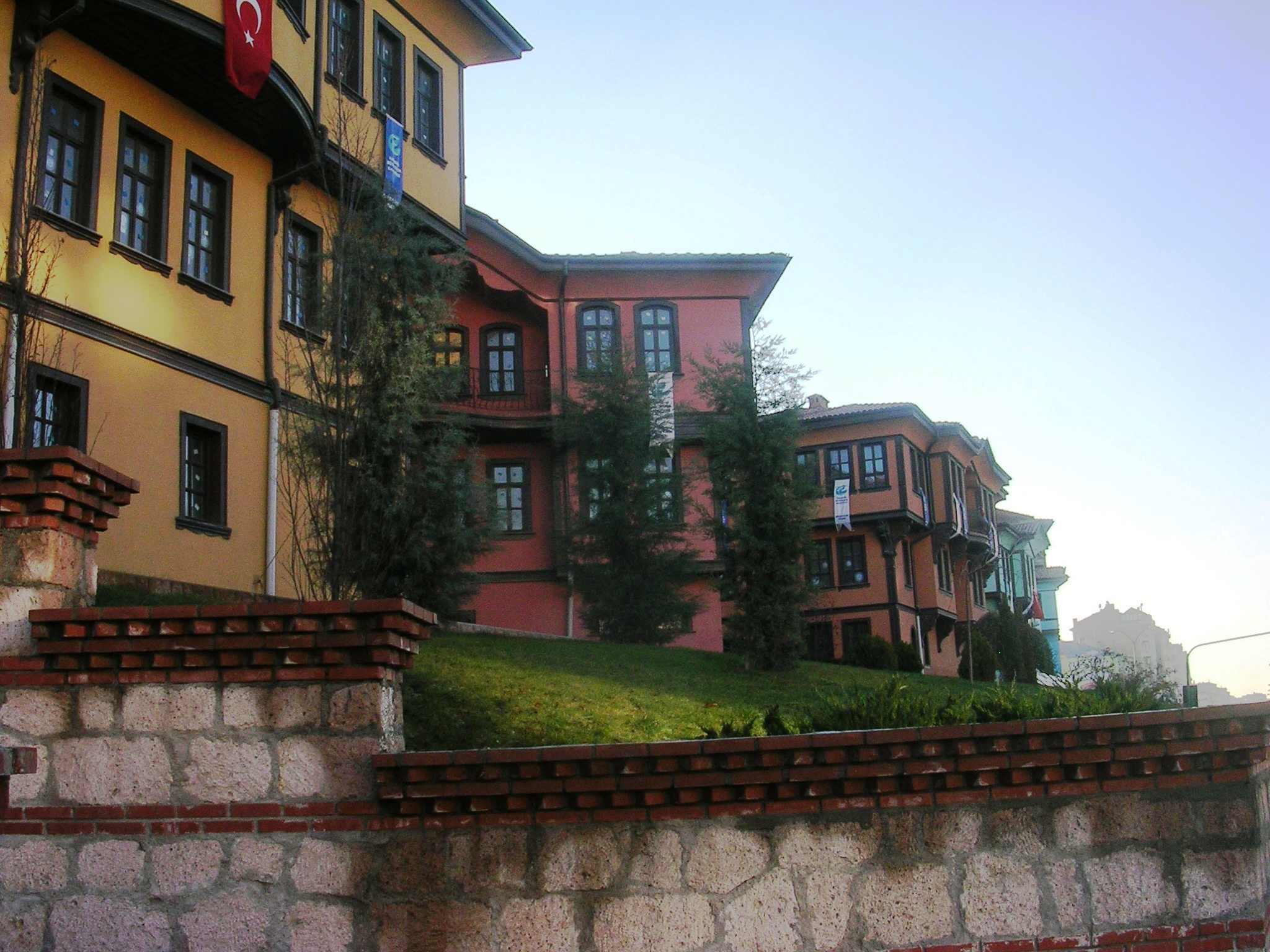
- Old houses in Odunpazarı district

- Logo

- Map showing Odunpazarı District in Eskişehir Province

- Location within Turkey Location within Turkey Central Anatolia
- Coordinates: 39°45′32″N 30°31′33″E
- Country: Turkey
- Province: Eskişehir

Government
  - Mayor: Kazım Kurt (New Party)
- Area: 1,120 km^{2} (430 sq mi)
- Population (2022): 422,423
  - Density: 377/km^{2} (977/sq mi)
- Time zone: UTC+3 (TRT)
- Area code: 0222
- Website: www.odunpazari.bel.tr

Odunpazarı (literally "firewood market" in Turkish) is a municipality and district of Eskişehir Province, Turkey. Its area is 1,120 km², and its population is 422,423 (2022), 47% of the provincial population. Odunpazarı District covers the southern part of Greater Eskişehir, including the historic center, and the adjacent countryside.

In 2008 the district Odunpazarı was created from part of the former central district of Eskişehir, along with the district Tepebaşı. At the 2013 Turkish local government reorganisation, the rural part of the district was integrated into the municipality, the villages becoming neighbourhoods.

== Historic buildings ==
- Alaeddin Mosque
- Kurşunlu Mosque and Complex

== Museums in Odunpazarı ==
- Eskişehir Meerschaum Museum
- Museum of Independence, Eskişehir
- Museum of Modern Glass Art, Eskişehir
- Tayfun Talipoğlu Typewriter Museum
- Yılmaz Büyükerşen Wax Museum
- Odunpazarı Modern Museum

== Sport ==
The Odunpazarı S.K. was promoted to the 2025–26 Turkish Women's Handball Super League.

== Neighbourhoods ==
Neighbourhoods (Mahalle) are small administrative units within the municipalities, and are administered by the muhtar and the Neighborhood Seniors Council consisting of 4 members. Muhtar and the Senior Council are elected for 5 years at the local elections and are not affiliated with political parties. Neighborhoods are not an incorporation therefore do not hold government status. Muhtar, although being elected by the residents, acts merely as an administrator of the district governor. Muhtar can voice the neighborhood issues to the municipal hall together with the Seniors Council.

There are 85 neighbourhoods in Odunpazarı District:

- 71 Evler
- Ağapınar
- Akarbaşı
- Akçağlan
- Akçakaya
- Akcami
- Akkaya
- Akpınar
- Alanönü
- Arifiye
- Aşağı Çağlan
- Aşağıılıca
- Avdan
- Ayvacık
- Büyükdere
- Çamlıca
- Çankaya
- Çavlum
- Cunudiye
- Dede
- Deliklitaş
- Demirli
- Doğankaya
- Emek
- Erenköy
- Eşenkara
- Gökmeydan
- Göztepe
- Gülpınar
- Gültepe
- Gümele
- Gündoğdu
- Harmandalı
- Huzur
- Ihlamurkent
- İmişehir
- İstiklal
- Kalkanlı
- Kanlıpınar
- Karaalan
- Karacahöyük
- Karacaşehir
- Karaçay
- Karahüyük
- Karamustafa
- Karapazar
- Karapınar
- Karatepe
- Kargın
- Kayacık
- Kayapınar
- Kıravdan
- Kireç
- Kırmızıtoprak
- Kurtuluş
- Kuyucak
- Lütfiye
- Musalar
- Orhangazi
- Orta
- Osmangazi
- Paşa
- Sarısungur
- Şarkiye
- Seklice
- Sevinç
- Sultandere
- Sultandere 75. Yıl
- Sümer
- Süpüren
- Türkmentokat
- Uluçayır
- Vadişehir
- Vişnelik
- Yahnikapan
- Yassıhöyük
- Yenidoğan
- Yenikent
- Yenisofça
- Yıldıztepe
- Yukarıçağlan
- Yukarıılıca
- Yukarıkalabak
- Yürükkaracaören
- Yürükkırka
