= Nur al-Din ibn Jaja =

Seljuk Emir of Kırşehir from 1261 to 1277

Nur al-Din Jibril, better known as Nur al-Din ibn Jaja, was a 13th-century emir in the Sultanate of Rum.

== Background and early life ==
While Jibril's father is identified as Baha al-Din Jaja, who was a local emir, the former's life prior to his rise as emir of Kırşehir is largely unknown. The origin of the name "Jaja" is proposed to be of Turkic or Mongolian origin. Though, thirteenth-century historian Izz al-Din ibn Shaddad listed Nur al-Din and his brother as one of the "grandees of Anatolia" separate from the "Mongol chiliarchs and centurions". An endowment deed explicitly mentioned that Nur al-Din understood Arabic without an interpreter, which according to modern historian Judith Pfeiffer, may indicate that Nur al-Din came from Syria, perhaps connected to Syrian Turkmen or Arabs, was a mamluk, or had relevant education at a madrasa (Islamic school). Historian Ibn Bibi attested to the tribe or community led by Jaja's family as jam'iyyat-e pesar-e Jaja (community of sons of Jaja), and the tribe of Jajalu found in Ottoman sources on Kırşehir was likely connected to this family.

== Tenure and death ==
Nur al-Din first appeared in sources in 1261, when Kilij Arslan IV (r. 1249–54, 57–66) was Sultan of Rum. According to Ibn Bibi, Nur al-Din was a camel-rider, who was granted control of Kırşehir as he was favored by vizier Mu'in al-Din Parwana. Shortly into his service, Nur al-Din extinguished the revolt by emir ahur Assad that lasted 5 months. Following the Mongol conquest of Anatolia, Nur al-Din joined the unsuccessful revolt against the Mongol Empire in 1276–77 but was pardoned. Nur al-Din and his brother Siraj al-Din Ismail fell captive in April 1277 when the Mamluk Sultanate defeated the Ilkhanate, successor of the Mongol Empire, in Elbistan. Although they were initially transported to Syria, the brothers were released before the death of the Mamluk Sultan Baybars (r. 1260–77) and were further granted land as iqta' (tax-farm) by Al-Sa'id Baraka (r. 1277–79). Nur al-Din may have died in Syria and later been buried in Kırşehir, where his tomb is located. The inscriptions on his tomb did not survive till the modern day, and Nur al-Din's death year and details on his life after his captivity are unknown.

== Patronage ==
Nur al-Din commissioned the construction of a madrasa, which came to be known as Cacabey Madrasa, in 1272–73, during the reign of Sultan Kaykhusraw III (r. 1266–84), as stated in its inscription. A detailed bilingual Arabic–Mongolian waqf deed (Islamic charitable endowment), dated 10 May 1272, survives in several manuscript copies and outlines the endowment he assigned to the madrasa, including agricultural lands, mills, vineyards, baths, shops, caravanserais, and houses across central Anatolia. These revenues were designated to support the madrasa's teaching activities, an associated lodge, elementary school, hospice, and charitable personnel, as well as two additional foundations on the Kayseri–Kırşehir route and in the village of "Talimekini" near Kayseri. The deed also stipulates regulations governing the conduct and obligations of students, reflecting a structured educational environment.

Later local tradition identified the building with astronomical study, but neither its inscription nor its endowment document mention scientific observation, and modern scholarship attributes such claims to later folklore. The complex fell into disuse in the Ottoman period, was partially converted to a mosque, and underwent modern restoration, after which it continued to function as a place of worship. Adjacent to the entrance stands Nur al-Din's own tomb, further linking his personal legacy to the institution he founded.

== Family ==
Nur al-Din had a son named Baha al-Din Pulad, who was a Mevlevi devotee.

== Bibliography ==
- Eyice, Semavi (1992). "Caca Bey Medresesi". TDV Encyclopedia of Islam, Vol. 6 (Beşi̇r Ağa Cami̇i̇ – Câfer Paşa Tekkesi̇) (in Turkish). Istanbul: Turkiye Diyanet Foundation, Centre for Islamic Studies. pp. 539–541. ISBN 978-975-389-433-3.
- Jackson, Cailah (2 May 2024). Mevlevi Manuscripts, 1268–c. 1400: A Study of the Sources. Springer Nature Switzerland. ISBN 9783031483677. OCLC 1402246241.
- Kucur, Sadi S. (1992). "Cacaoğlu Nûreddin". TDV Encyclopedia of Islam, Vol. 6 (Beşi̇r Ağa Cami̇i̇ – Câfer Paşa Tekkesi̇) (in Turkish). Istanbul: Turkiye Diyanet Foundation, Centre for Islamic Studies. pp. 541–542. ISBN 978-975-389-433-3.
- Pfeiffer, Judith (18 November 2013). "Protecting private property vs negotiating political authority: Nur al-Din b. Jaja and his endowments in thirteenth-century Anatolia". In Peacock, A.C.S; Abdullaeva, Firuza; Hillenbrand, Robert (eds.). Ferdowsi, the Mongols and the History of Iran: Art, Literature and Culture from Early Islam to Qajar Persia. Bloomsbury Publishing. ISBN 9781786734655. OCLC 1029054825.
