= Filiz Kerestecioğlu =

Turkish politician (born 1961)

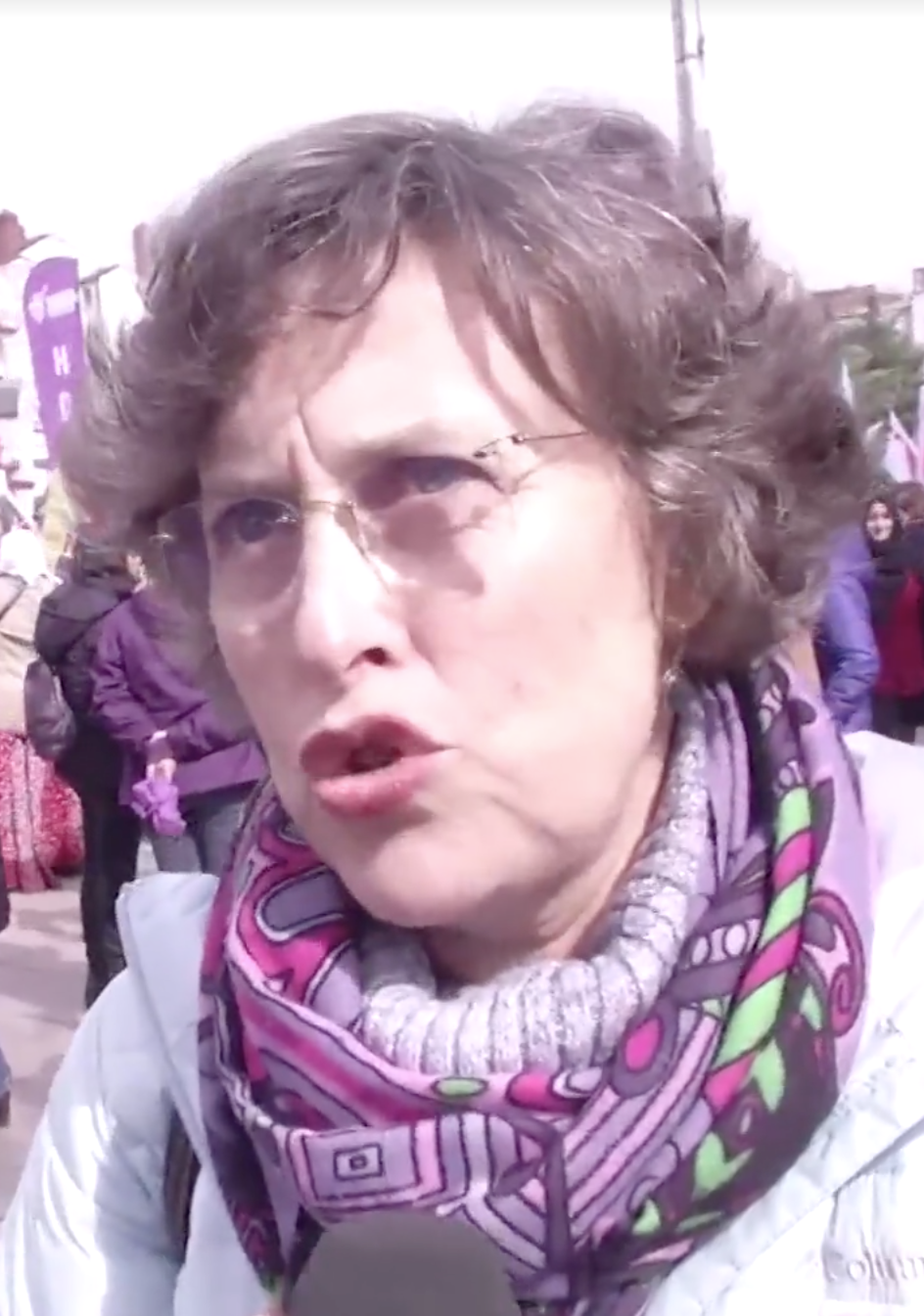

Member of the Grand National Assembly
- In office 23 June 2015 – 14 May 2023
- Constituency: İstanbul (II) (June 2015, Nov 2015); Ankara (I) (2018)

Personal details
- Born: 31 January 1961 (age 65) Gölcük, Turkey
- Party: Peoples' Democratic Party (HDP)
- Education: Ankara University

Filiz Kerestecioğlu Demir (born 31 January 1961) is a Turkish politician from the Peoples' Democratic Party (HDP) who currently serves as a Member of Parliament since the June 2015 general election.

== Early life and career ==
Filiz Kerestecioğlu was born on 31 January 1961 in Gölcük and graduated from Ankara University Faculty of Law in 1984. In 1987, she started working as a freelance lawyer. Between 1991 and 1992, she worked as a representative for the Nokta Magazine in Switzerland, also working as a Turkish and English language teacher there. In 1995, she participated in the production of a documentary called 'Women Exist' and wrote the music and lyrics for the song of the same name. She was a founding member of the Women's Rights Implementation Centre at the İstanbul Bar Association, and worked as the secretary for the Bar Association Foreign Relations Commission. Between 2004 and 2012, she worked as an editor for the Contemporary Law Magazine (Güncel Hukuk).

== Political career ==
As a candidate for the Peoples' Democratic Party, Kerestecioğlu was elected as a Member of Parliament for İstanbul's second electoral district in the June 2015 general election. She was re-elected in the November 2015 snap general election despite her party's fall in the vote share. In

Kerestecioğlu is a member of the Parliamentary Assembly of the Council of Europe (PACE) and currently serves as the third vice president of the PACE Committee on Equality and Non-Discrimination.

On 18 April 2018, following President Recep Tayyip Erdoğan's call for a snap general election, Kerestecioğlu was rumoured to be a potential HDP candidate for the presidential election. She denied a potential presidential run on the same day. But she was re-elected as an MP in the snap elections in June 2018. On the 17 March 2021, the State Prosecutor for the Court of Cassation in Turkey Bekir Şahin filed a lawsuit before the Constitutional Court, demanding for Kerestecioğlu and 686 other politicians of the HDP a five-year ban for a political participation. The lawsuit was filed jointly with a request for the HDP to be shut down due to the parties alleged organizational ties with the Kurdistan Workers' Party (PKK).
