= Caste systems in Africa =

Forms of social stratification found in various African ethnic groups

Caste systems in Africa are a form of social stratification found in numerous ethnic groups, in over fifteen countries, particularly in the Sahel, West Africa, and North Africa. These caste systems feature endogamy, hierarchical status, inherited occupation, membership by birth, pollution concepts and restraints on commensality.

The specifics of the caste systems in Africa vary among the ethnic groups. Some societies have a rigid and strict caste system with embedded slavery, whereas others are more diffuse and complex. Countries in Africa that have societies with caste systems include Mali, Mauritania, Senegal, Gambia, Guinea, Ivory Coast, Niger, Burkina Faso, Cameroon, Liberia, Sudan, Sierra Leone, Nigeria, Chad, Ethiopia, Somalia, Djibouti, Eritrea and others. It is unclear exactly when and how these caste systems developed, some likely emerged sometime between the 9th century and 15th century in various ethnic groups. Others, such as the occupational segregation and caste-based endogamy practiced by the Ari people, have been revealed by advances in archaeogenetics to be among the oldest continuous caste systems in existence.

== East Africa ==
There has been much recent scholarship on caste systems in the Horn of Africa. They have been studied in communities that speak Semitic, Cushitic, and Omotic languages. The term "Manja" or ""Manjo" is found repeatedly. The terminology used by various scholars has varied but they have found consistently found links between social groupings and occupations, often potters, metal workers, weavers, leather workers. This list of sources is incomplete, but contains important sources.

=== Amhara people ===
The social stratification of the Amhara people of Ethiopia includes castes. According to Donald Levine – a professor of sociology specializing in Ethiopian society – the Amhara society has consisted of high-ranking clans, low-ranking clans, caste groups (Weyto caste, artisans), and slaves. The Amhara caste system was hierarchically higher than its lowest slaves strata.

The Amhara caste system consisted of: (1) endogamy, (2) hierarchical status, (3) restraints on commensality, (4) pollution concepts, (5) each caste has had a traditional occupation, and (6) inherited caste membership. This caste system has been a rigid, endogamous and occupationally closed social stratification among Amhara and other Afro-Asiatic-speaking Ethiopian ethnic groups. However, some state it as an economically closed, endogamous class system or as occupational minorities, whereas others such as the historian David Todd state that this system can be unequivocally labelled as caste-based.

=== Borana people ===
The Borana people are found in southern Ethiopia and northeastern Kenya. They have historically had castes, among which the hunters and artisans have constituted the depressed strata. These are endogamous castes each with a specialized inherited occupation, and include a stratum that constitutes outcastes. They are found in virtually every Cushitic or Semitic community of this region.

The lower castes of the Borana people, states Herbert Lewis – a professor of anthropology specializing in East African societies – show no physical differences from the noble castes of Somalia and Somalilands. Other than endogamy and occupational differences between the castes, their ritual, social and political positions are different, as are the beliefs held by each about the nature of the other. For example, the castes have long considered each other as ritually impure, and food prepared by either nobles or artisans castes is considered a taboo to others. Similarly, traditionally, the craftsman and the noble are ritually forbidden to enter the house of the other. Low caste people are expected not to handle farm equipment or cattle.

=== Oromo people ===
The Oromo people are the largest ethnic group in Ethiopia, also found in northern Kenya and Somalia, with an estimated total population of over 35 million.

Like other ethnic groups in East Africa, Oromo people regionally developed social stratification consisting of four hierarchical strata. The highest strata were the nobles called the Borana, below them were the Gabbaro (some 17th to 19th century Ethiopian texts refer them as the dhalatta). Below these two upper castes were the despised castes of artisans, and at the lowest level were the slaves.

In the Islamic Kingdom of Jimma, the Oromo society's caste strata predominantly consisted of endogamous, inherited artisanal occupations. Each caste group has specialized in a particular occupation such as iron working, carpentry, weapon making, pottery, weaving, leather working and hunting.

The castes in the Oromo society have had a designated name, such as Tumtu were smiths, Fuga were potters, Faqi were tanners and leatherworkers, Semmano for weavers, Gagurtu were bee keepers and honey makers, Watta were hunters and foragers. While slaves were an endogamous strata within the Oromo society, they themselves were also victims of slavery. By the 19th century, Oromo slaves were sought after and a major part of slaves sold in Gondar and Gallabat slave markets at Ethiopia–Sudan border, as well as the Massawa and Tajura markets on the Red Sea.

=== Somali people ===
The Somalis are an ethnic group of between 15 and 20 million people, constituting the largest ethnicity in Somalia, many of whom also live in Ethiopia, Kenya, and Djibouti.

They have historically exhibited social stratification that has included embedded castes referred to as Higal (or Higalki, Argobba). The upper noble strata has been called Gob (or Asha), while the lower servile strata have been referred to as Sáb. The three main Somali castes are called Tumal (sometimes spelled Tomal), Midgan and Yibir (sometimes spelled Yebir). These fell outside of the traditional clan structure. The castes have been endogamous, a person born into it inherited its occupation. The Midgan have been the hunters, Tumal were the smiths, pottery and leatherworking caste, and the Yibir have been the saddle and prayer mat makers and magician caste. Below the castes have been the Somali Bantus Jareer community, and these have been descendants of former slaves, including those who were runaway and emancipated slaves.

According to Mohamed Eno and Abdi Kusow, the Somali caste communities are ethnically indistinguishable from each other, but upper castes have stigmatized the lower ones with mythical narratives such as they being of unholy origins or being engaged in dirty occupations. The four strata social system – high lineage, low lineage, caste groups and slaves – found among the Somalis has been common in the Horn of Africa region, states Donald Levine, and is also found among ethnic groups such as Afar, Amhara, Borana, Leqa, Sidamo, Kefa, Janjero and other peoples.

According to Catherine Besteman – a professor of anthropology – the widespread purchase of non-Somali African slaves during the medieval age helped structure the complex status hierarchy among the Somalis. However, adds Besteman, the Somali people from the upper strata have also been egalitarian in matters of clan leadership, while they have included concepts of social status, inferiority and exclusion of Sáb and slaves. In the northern regions where Somalis are traditionally found, states Iaon Lewis, Somali communities have traditionally distinguished between the artisanal Somali castes and their slaves, but in the south they have blurred these distinctions.

The castes among Somali people have also existed in other East African ethnic groups. For instance, cognates to Somali castes have been recorded in 16th century texts among the Oromo people, states Cornelius Jaenen. The table below illustrate some alternate terms for castes mirroring the Somali Madhiban in other ethnic groups that share this region with the Somali people. Similarly, equivalent terms for castes in other northeast and east African ethnic groups mirror other castes such as the Tomal and the Yibir of Somali people.

Castes equivalent to Madhiban in the Horn of Africa
Ethnic group	Caste name	Occupation
Somali	Midgan, Madhiban	hunters, leather tanners
Amhara people	Weyto caste, Faqi	hunters, tanners
Argobba people	Faqin	tanners
Borana people	Watta	hunters, tanners, potters, foragers
Gurage people	Fuga	hunters, woodworkers
Janjero people	Fuga	hunters, potters, tanners
Kefa people	Manjo	hunters, guards
Qemant people	Arabinya	tanners
She people	Kwayeju	hunters
Sidama people	Awacho	tanners

== North Africa ==
=== Moors ===
Moorish societies of the Maghreb were traditionally (and still is, to some extent) stratified. According to Rebecca Popenoe, a professor of anthropology, the Islamic scriptures do not dictate a caste system, and caste systems are not divinely ordained. In the Mauritanian context, the Kafa'ah doctrine has been developed as a justification for considering family status before marriage, annulment of marriages between unequal people, and endogamy.

Moors have owned slaves for centuries. The slaves are traditionally called Haratin and `Abid, and they were the lowest status endogamous castes, largely segregated oasis-dwelling black people, in the Moors society.

The Haratin of Mauritania, states Joseph Hellweg – a professor of anthropology specializing in West African studies – were part of a social caste-like hierarchy that likely developed between 1300 and 1500 CE because of a Bedouin legacy. The "Hassan" monopolized the occupations related to war and politics, the "Zwaya" (Zawaya) the religious roles, the "Bidan" (White Moors) owned property and held slaves (Haratins, Black Moors), and the slaves constituted the lowest of the social strata. Each of these were castes, endogamous, with hereditary occupations and where the upper strata collected tribute (horma) from the lower strata of Mauritanian society, considered them socially inferior, and denied them the right to own land or weapons thereby creating a socio-economically closed system.

Among Hassaniya Arabic speakers in southern Morocco and Mauritania, states Sean Hanretta – a professor of African History, the term Bidan is a "caste synecdoche" that refers to Hassani (warrior) and Zwaya (clerical) clans. In the slave castes, they recognized two layers, the `Abid (slaves) and Haratins (freed slaves). According to Remco Ensel – a professor of anthropology specializing in Maghreb studies – the word "Haratin" in Moroccan is a pejorative that connotes "subordination, disrepute" and in contemporary literature, it is often replaced with "Drawi", "Drawa", "Sahrawi", "Sahrawa" or other regional terms. The Haratins historically lived segregated from the main society, in a rural isolation. Their subjugation regardless of their religion was sometimes ideologically justified by nobles and some Islamic scholars, even though some scholars took a more nuanced view that Muslims can only enslave non-Muslims and they should not enslave other Muslims, states Hamel – a professor of history specializing in African studies. They along with Swasin in Morocco and other northern fringe societies of the Sahara, were a part of a social hierarchy that included the upper strata of nobles, religious specialists and literati, followed by freemen, nomadic pastoral strata and slaves. The Haratin were hierarchically higher than the `Abid (descendant of slaves) at the very bottom, but lower than Ahrar. This hierarchy, states Ensel, has been variously described as ethnic groups, estates, quasi-castes, castes or classes.

=== Tuareg people ===
The Tuareg people are a large Berber ethnic confederation found in North Africa. They principally inhabit the Sahara desert, in a vast area stretching from far southwestern Libya to southern Algeria, Niger, Mali and Burkina Faso. Traditionally nomadic pastoralists, small groups of Tuareg are also found in northern Nigeria. Tuareg society has traditionally featured clan membership, social status and caste hierarchies within each political confederation. These hierarchical systems have included nobles, clerics, craftsmen and unfree strata of people.

In Tuareg hierarchical caste system, the nobles constitute the highest caste. They are known in the Tuareg language as imúšaɣ (Imajaghan, "the proud and free" in the amazigh language). The nobles had a monopoly on carrying arms and camels, were the warriors of the Tuareg regions. They may have achieved their social status by subjugating other Tuareg castes, keeping arms to defend their properties and vassals. They have also collected tribute from their vassals. This warrior nobility has traditionally married within their caste, not to individuals in strata below their own. A collection of tribes, each led by a noble, forms a confederation called amanokal, whose chieftain is elected from among the nobles by the tribal chiefs. The chietain is the overlord during times of war, and receives tribute and taxes from tribes as a sign of their submission to his authority.

The vassal-herdsmen are the second free strata within Tuareg society, occupying a position just below that of the nobles. They are known as ímɣad (Imghad, singular Amghid) in the Tuareg language. Although the vassals were also free, they did not own camels but instead kept donkeys and herds of goats, sheep and oxen. They pastured and tended their own herds as well those owned by the nobles of the confederation. The vassal strata have traditionally paid an annual tiwse, or tribute to the nobles as a part of their status obligations, and also hosted any noble who is traveling through their territory. In late medieval era, states Prasse, this weapon monopoly broke down after regional wars took a heavy toll on the noble warrior strata, and thereafter the vassals carried weapons as well and were recruited as warriors. After the start of the French colonial rule which dislodged the nobles from their powers over war and taxation, the Tuaregs belonging to the noble strata disdained tending cattle and tilling the land, seeking instead warrior or intellectual work.

A semi-noble strata of the Tuareg people has been the endogamous religious clerics, the marabouts (Tuareg: Ineslemen, a loan word that means Muslim in Arabic). After the adoption of Islam, they became integral to the Tuareg social structure. According to Norris, this strata of Muslim clerics has been a sacerdotal caste, which propagated Islam in North Africa and the Sahel between the 7th and the 17th centuries. Adherence to the faith was initially centered around this caste, but later spread to the wider Tuareg community. The marabouts have traditionally been the judges (qadi) and religious leaders (imam) of a Tuareg community.

According to the anthropologist Jeffrey Heath, Tuareg artisans belong to separate endogamous castes known as the Inhædˤæn (Inadan). These have included the blacksmith, jewelers, wood workers and leather artisan castes. They produced and repaired the saddles, tools, household items and other items for the Tuareg community. In Niger and Mali, where the largest Tuareg populations are found, the artisan castes were attached as clients to a family of nobles or vassals, and carried messages over distances for their patron family. They also are the ones who traditionally sacrifice animals during Islamic festivals.

These social strata, like caste systems found in many parts of West Africa, included singers, musicians and story tellers of the Tuareg, who kept their oral traditions. They are called Agguta by Tuareg, have been called upon to sing during ceremonies such as weddings or funerals. The origins of the artisanal castes are unclear. One theory posits a Jewish derivation, a proposal that Prasse calls "a much vexed question". Their association with fire, iron and precious metals and their reputation for being cunning tradesman has led others to treat them with a mix of admiration and distrust.

According to Rasmussen, the Tuareg castes are not only hierarchical, as each caste differs in mutual perception, food and eating behaviors. On this point, she relates an explanation by a smith on why there is endogamy among castes among Tuareg in Niger. The smith explained, "Nobles are like rice, Smiths are like millet, Slaves are like corn."

In the Tuareg areas of Algeria, a distinct tenant-peasant strata lives around oases known as izeggaren (or haratin in Arabic). Traditionally, these local peasants were subservient to the warrior nobles who owned the oasis and the land. The peasants tilled these fields, whose output they gave to the nobles after keeping a fifth part of the produce. Their Tuareg patrons were usually responsible for supplying agricultural tools, seed and clothing. The peasants' origins are also unclear. One theory postulates that they are descendants of ancient people who lived in the Sahara before they were dominated by invading groups. Some speak a Songhay dialect along with Tuareg and Arabic. In contemporary times, these peasant strata have blended in with freed black slaves and farm arable lands together.

According to the historian Starratt, the Tuareg evolved a system of slavery that was highly differentiated. They established strata among their slaves, which determined rules as to the slave's expected behavior, marriageability, inheritance rights if any, and occupation. The Ikelan later became a bonded caste within Tuareg society. According to Heath, the Bella in the Tuareg society were the slave caste whose occupation was rearing and herding livestock such as sheep and goats.

== West Africa ==
=== Fula people ===
The Fula people are one of the largest and a widely dispersed Muslim ethnic group in Sahel and West Africa. They number between 20 and 25 million people in total across many countries of this region, and they have historically featured a caste system.

The Fula caste system has been fairly rigid and has medieval roots. It was well established by the 15th century, and it has survived into modern age. The four major castes, states Martin Kich, in their order of status are "nobility, traders, tradesmen (such as blacksmiths) and descendants of slaves". According to the African Commission on Human and Peoples' Rights, the Fulani people have held on to "a strict caste system".

The upper caste consists of the nobles. Below these are the marabouts or clerics, then the cattle owning Fula people. Below all these are the artisan castes, which includes the blacksmiths, potters, griots, genealogists, woodworkers, and dressmakers. They belong to castes but are not enslaved and are free people. Then there are those castes of captive, slave or serf ancestry: the Maccuɗo, Rimmayɓe, Dimaajo, and less often Ɓaleeɓe, the Fulani equivalent of the Tuareg Ikelan known as Bouzou (Buzu)/Bella in the Hausa and Songhay languages respectively.

The Fulani castes are endogamous in nature, meaning individuals marry only within their caste. This caste system, however, wasn't as elaborate in places like northern Nigeria, Eastern Niger or Cameroon. According to some estimates, by the late 19th century, slaves constituted about 50% of the population of the Fulɓe-ruled Adamawa Emirate, where they were referred to as jeyaɓe (singular jeyado). Though very high, these figures are representative of many other emirates of the Sokoto Caliphate, of which Adamawa formed a part. The castes-based social stratification among the Fula people was widespread and seen across the Sahel, such as Burkina Faso, Niger, Senegal, Guinea, Mali, Nigeria, Sudan, and others.

=== Igbo people ===
The Osu caste system in Nigeria and southern Cameroon of the Igbo people can be traced back to Odinani, the traditional Igbo religion. It is the belief of many Igbo traditionalists that the Osus are people historically owned by deities, and are therefore considered to be a 'living sacrifice', an outcast, untouchable and sub-human (similar to the Roman practice of homo sacer). This system received literary attention when it became a key plot point in No Longer at Ease by Chinua Achebe.

People regarded as modern-day Osu in Igboland are descendants of individuals who volunteered and were sacrificed to the various gods. These fore-fathers pledged themselves and their descendants to these gods. They enjoyed protection and privileges but were segregated from ordinary folks. These Osu people married, fraternized and socialized among themselves. The practice continued to this day. An ordinary Igbo person would not marry or permit any of his relations to marry an Osu person. In a few instances where that has happened, every member of that non-Osu who married an Osu became infested and were regarded as Osu.

It can be said that the only aspect of Igbo life that keeps the Osu segregation intact is marriage. An Osu could and could only marry a fellow Osu, and no more. It is a taboo and abhorrent for an Osu to marry a non-Osu – love or lust being immaterial.

Some suggest that due to the introduction of modernization, the Osu system is gradually leaving Igboland and tradition. The influence of Christianity (specifically Roman Catholicism) has caused Odinani to start slowly disappearing from Igboland. Obinna, in 2012, reports that in the Igbo community – in Enugu and Delta states, and most especially in Anambra and Imo states – Osu caste system remains a social issue. The Osu caste is determined by one's birth into a particular family irrespective of the religion practised by the individual. Once born into the Osu caste, this Nigerian person is an outcast, with limited opportunities or acceptance, regardless of his or her ability or merit. Obinna discusses how this caste system-related identity and power is deployed within government, Church and indigenous communities.

=== Mande people ===
Among the Mande societies in Mali, Senegal, the Gambia, Guinea, Sierra Leone, Liberia, Ivory Coast and Ghana, people are divided by occupation and ethnic ties. The highest hierarchy in the Mande caste system, the Horon (nobles/freeborn), are traditionally farmers, fisherman, warriors and animal breeders, the lowest caste are the Jonow, a "slave" caste, made up of people whose ancestors were enslaved by other Africans during wars. An important feature of this system are castes based on trade, such as blacksmiths and griots.

=== Mandinka people ===
The Mandinka people are a West African ethnic group with an estimated population of eleven million with roots in western Sahel, in Mali, but now widely dispersed. Over 99% of Mandinka are Muslim.

The Mandinka people live primarily in West Africa, particularly in the Gambia and the Guinea where they are the largest ethnic group. Major populations of the Mandinka people also live in Mali, Sierra Leone, Ivory Coast, Senegal, Burkina Faso, Liberia, Guinea-Bissau, Niger and Mauritania. Their traditional society has featured socially stratified castes, from at least the 13th century.

The Mandinka society, states Arnold Hughes – a professor of West African studies and African politics– has been "divided into three endogamous castes – the freeborn (foro), slaves (jongo), and artisans and praise singers (nyamolo). The freeborn castes are primarily farmers, while the slave strata included labor providers to the farmers, as well as leather workers, pottery makers, metal smiths, griots and others. The Mandinka Muslim clerics and scribes have traditionally been a separate endogamous occupational caste called Jakhanke, with their Islamic roots traceable to about the 13th-century.

The Mandinka castes are hereditary, and marriages outside the caste was forbidden. Their caste system is similar to those of other ethnic groups of the African Sahel region, and found across the Mandinka communities such as those in Gambia, Mali, Guinea and other countries.

=== Senufo people ===
The Senufo people are found in a region spanning the northern Ivory Coast, the southeastern Mali and the western Burkina Faso. One sub-group, the Nafana, is found in north-western Ghana.

The Senufo people have traditionally been a socially stratified society that has included castes and slaves. These endogamous divisions are locally called Katioula, and one of the strata in this division includes slaves and descendants of slaves. According to Dolores Richter, the caste system found among Senufo people features "hierarchical ranking including despised lower castes, occupational specificity, ritual complementarity, endogamy, hereditary membership, residential isolation and the political superiority of farmers over artisan castes".

=== Soninke people ===
The Soninke people are a West African ethnic group found in eastern Senegal and its capital Dakar, northwestern Mali and southern Mauritania. Predominantly Muslims, the Soninke were one of the early ethnic groups from Sub-Saharan West Africa to convert to Islam about the 10th century. The contemporary population of Soninke people is estimated to be over 2 million. The cultural practices of Soninke people are similar to the Mandé peoples, and includes social stratification. According to the anthropologist Tal Tamari, the Soninke society became highly stratified after the thirteenth century.

The Soninke strata have included a free category called Horro or Horon, a caste system category called Namaxala or Nyaxamalo, and slaves called Komo. In the Jaara subgroup of the Soninke people, the nobility called Tunkanlenmu was another strata.

The slaves were the largest strata, one at the bottom among the Soninke like other West African ethnic groups, and constituted up to half of the population. The slaves among the Soninke people were hierarchically arranged into three strata. The village slaves were a privileged servile group who lived apart from the village and took orders from the village chief. The domestic slaves lived in with a family and could not be sold. The lowest level among slaves were the trade slaves who could be bought and sold. With time, each of these strata became endogamous, states Daniel Littlefield – a professor of history.

Above the slaves were the castes of Soninke, which too were hereditary, endogamous and had an embedded hierarchical status. They included, for example, the garanke (leather workers) below the fune (bard), the fune below the gesere or jeli (griots, singers), the jeli below the tage or numu (smiths, pottery workers).

=== Susu people ===
The Susu people are a West African ethnic group, one of the Mandé peoples living primarily in Guinea. Influential in Guinea, smaller communities of Susu people are also found in the neighboring Sierra Leone and Guinea-Bissau. The Susu are a patrilineal society, predominantly Muslim, who favor endogamous cross-cousin marriages with polygynous households common. They have a caste system like all Manding-speaking peoples of West Africa, where the artisans such as smiths, carpenters, musicians, jewelers and leatherworkers are separate castes, and believed to have descended from the medieval era slavery.

The Susu people, like other Manding-speaking peoples, have a caste system regionally referred to by terms such as Nyamakala, Naxamala and Galabbolalauba. According to David Conrad and Barbara Frank, the terms and social categories in this caste-based social stratification system of Susu people shows cases of borrowing from Arabic only, but the likelihood is that these terms are linked to Latin, Greek or Aramaic.

The artisans among Susu people such as smiths, carpenters, musicians and bards (Yeliba), jewelers and leatherworkers are separate castes. The Susu people believe that these castes have descended from the medieval era slaves. The Susu castes are not limited to Guinea, but are found in other regions where Susu people live, such as in Sierra Leone where too they are linked to the historic slavery system that existed in the region, states Daniel Harmon. The Susu castes in the regional Muslim communities were prevalent and recorded by sociologists in late 19th and early 20th centuries.

=== Temne people ===
The Temne people are a West African ethnic group. They are predominantly found in the northwestern and central parts of Sierra Leone, as well as the national capital Freetown. Some Temne are also found in Guinea. The Temne constitute the largest ethnic group in Sierra Leone, at 35% of the total population. Temne society consists of patrilineal clans, is predominantly a mix of Muslim and polytheists, and some clans feature castes.

The artisans and musicians in the Temne society have been endogamous caste people. The terminology of this social stratification system and the embedded hierarchy may have been adopted among the Temne from the nearby Mandinka people, Fula people and Susu people. The caste hierarchy and social stratification has been more well established in the northern Islamic parts of Temne territories. The endogamous slave castes were held in Temne clans as agriculture workers and domestic servants, and they formed the lowest subservient layer of the social strata. Enslaved women served as domestic workers, wives and concubines.

=== Toucouleur people ===
The Toucouleur people are a Muslim West African ethnic group found mostly in Futa Toro region of Senegal, with some in Mali and Mauritania. The Toucouleur embraced Islam in the 11th century, their early and strong Islamic heritage is a matter of great pride for them. They have been influential in the spread of Islam to West Africa in the medieval era, later founded the vast Tukulor Empire in the 19th century under Umar Tal that led a religious war against their neighboring ethnic groups and the French colonial forces. The Toucouleur society has been patrilineal, polygynous and with high social stratification that included slavery and caste system.

Toucouleur society is divided into strict and rigid caste hierarchies.

The highest status among the five Toucouleur castes is of the aristocratic leaders and Islamic scholars called Torobe. Below them are the Rimbe, or the administrators, traders and farmers. The Nyenbe are the artisan castes of the Toucouleur society. The fourth caste strata is called the Gallunkobe or the slaves or descendants of slaves "who have been freed". The bottom strata among the Toucouleurs are the Matyube or slaves. The slaves were acquired by raiding pagan ethnic groups or purchased in slave markets, or the status was inherited.

The hierarchical social stratification has been an economically closed system, which historically has meant a marked inequality. Property and land has been exclusively owned by the upper caste members. Occupations and caste memberships are inherited. The Toucouleur castes have been endogamous, segregated and intermarriage has been rare. The clerics among Toucouleur like the Wolof people formed a separate group. The religious leaders were not necessarily endogamous nor an inherited post in Toucouleur people's long history, but it has been rare for lower caste people to become religious specialist, states Rüdiger Seesemann, as they were viewed as not sufficiently adhering to the "clerical standards of piety".

=== Wolof people ===
The Wolof people are a West African Muslim ethnic group found in northwestern Senegal, The Gambia, and southwestern coastal Mauritania. In Senegal, the Wolof are the largest ethnic group (~ 39%), and their combined population exceeds 6 million. The Wolof people, like other West African ethnic groups, have historically maintained a rigid, endogamous social stratification that included nobility, clerics, castes and slaves. The Wolof caste system has existed at least since the 15th century.

The social strata have included a free category called geer, a castes category called nyeenyo or neeno, and a servile category of slaves called jaam. Caste status has been hereditary, and endogamy among the men and women of a particular caste status has been an enduring feature among the Wolof people, states Leonardo Villalón – a professor of political science and African studies. The Wolof's caste status, states Villalón, has been and is a greater barrier to inter-marriage than is either ethnicity or religion in Senegal.

The castes have also been hierarchal, with lowest level being those of griots. Their inherited inferiority has been culturally stated to be close to those of slaves (jaams or kaals). The castes, states David Gamble, were associated with ideas of relative purity-impurity. The leatherworkers, for example, were considered the lowest of the nyenyo because their occupation involving animal skins was considered dirty.

Slaves have historically been a separate, endogamous group in the Wolof society. Slavery was either inherited by birth in the Wolof society, or were kidnapped, purchased as children from desperate parents during difficult times such as a famine, or slavery was imposed by the village elders as a punishment for offenses. By the early 18th-century, all sorts of charges and petty crimes resulted in the accused being punished to the slave strata. Slaves acquired by kidnapping, purchase or as captives of war were called jaam sayor in the Wolof society.

The geer or "freeborn" too had a hierarchical structure. At the top were the royal rulers, below them were the regionally or locally powerful noble lineages who controlled territories and collected tribute, and below them were commoner freeborn called the baadoolo or "lacking power".

=== Zarma people ===
The Zarma people are an ethnic group predominantly found in westernmost Niger also found in significant numbers in the adjacent areas of Nigeria and Benin, along with smaller numbers in Burkina Faso, Ivory Coast and Ghana. The Zarma people are predominantly Muslims of the Maliki-Sunni school, and they live in the arid Sahel lands, along the Niger River valley which is a source of irrigation, forage for cattle herds, and drinking water. The Zarma people have had a history of slave and caste system, like many West African ethnic groups.

The Zarma people have traditionally been a socially stratified society, like the Songhai people, featuring castes, state Jean-Pierre Olivier de Sardan, Tal Tamari and other scholars. According to the medieval and colonial era descriptions, their vocation has been hereditary, and each stratified group has been endogamous. The social stratification embedded slavery, wherein the lowest strata of the population inherited slavery, and second the Zima or priests and Islamic clerics had to be initiated but did not automatically inherit that profession, making the cleric strata a pseudo-caste. According to Ralph Austen – a professor emeritus of African history – the caste system among the Zarma people was not as well developed as the caste system historically found in the African ethnic groups further west to them.

Caste-based servitude
The traditional form of caste-based servitude was still practiced by the Tuareg, Zarma and Arab ethnic minorities.

— Country Report: Niger (2008)
US State Department

The different strata of the Zarma-Songhai people have included the kings and warriors, the scribes, the artisans, the weavers, the hunters, the fishermen, the leather workers and hairdressers (Wanzam), and the domestic slaves (Horso, Bannye). Each caste reveres its own guardian spirit. Some scholars such as John Shoup list these strata in three categories: free (chiefs, farmers and herders), servile (artists, musicians and griots), and the slave class. The servile group were socially required to be endogamous, while the slaves could be emancipated over four generations. The highest social level, states Shoup, claim to have descended from king "Sonni 'Ali Ber" and their modern era hereditary occupation has been Sohance (sorcerer). The traditionally free strata of the Zerma people have owned property and herds, and these have dominated the political system and governments during and after the French colonial rule. Within the stratified social system, the Islamic system of polygynous marriages is a part of the Zarma people tradition, with preferred partners being cross cousins, and a system of ritualistic acceptance between co-wives. This endogamy is similar to other ethnic groups in West Africa.

== Central Africa ==
=== Mandara people ===
The Mandara people are a Central African Muslim ethnic group found in north Cameroon, northeastern Nigeria, and southeastern Chad. They have lived in the mountainous region and valleys north of the Benue River in Cameroon, converted to Islam sometime around the 16th century, and have long been a part of the Mandara Sultanate.

The Mandara society developed into a socially stratified system, with Sultan and royalty, farmers, horse breeders, artisans, iron workers and smiths forming distinct endogamous occupation-inheriting castes. The caste system among the Mandara people integrated the concept that the strata have innate pollution and therefore they are stigmatized, however there is no evidence that their Islamic belief integrated the differences between the socially differentiated castes in their society to have been divinely sanctioned. The Mandara people also featured an endogamous slave strata.

=== Toubou people ===
The Toubou people are an Islamic ethnic group inhabiting northern Chad, southern Libya, northeastern Niger, and northwestern Sudan.

The Toubou people, states Jean Chapelle – a professor of history specializing in Chadian ethnic groups – have been socially stratified with an embedded caste system. The three strata have consisted of the freemen with a right to own property, the artisanal castes and the slaves.

The endogamous caste of Azza (or Aza) among Toubou have the artisanal occupations, such as metal work, leather work, pottery and tailoring, and they have traditionally been despised and segregated by other strata of the Toubou, much like the Hadahid caste in southeastern Chad among the Zaghawa people. Marriage between a member of the blacksmith caste and a member from a different strata of the Toubou people has been culturally unacceptable. The strata locally called Kamadja were the slaves. The language used by the Azza people is a variant of the Tebu language, but mutually intelligible.

=== Zaghawa people ===
The Zaghawa people, also called Beri or Zakhawa, are a Central African Muslim ethnic group of eastern Chad and western Sudan, including Darfur. The Zaghawa are mentioned in classical Arabic language texts by Islamic historians and geographers. The century in which the Zaghawa people adopted Islam has been a subject of debate and little consensus, with estimates ranging from the 13th to the early 17th century.

The Zaghawa society has been socially stratified and has included castes. The upper strata has been of nobles and warriors, below them have been the traders and merchants, below whom have been the artisan castes called the Hadaheed (or Hadahid). These castes have been endogamous, and their inherited occupations have included iron work, hunters, pottery, leatherwork and musicians such as drummers. The artisan work has traditionally been viewed within the Zaghawa society as dirty and of inferior status, being people from different pagan and Jewish roots who slowly assimilated into the Islamic society.

The term "blacksmith" has been a derogatory term in Zaghawa culture, states Anne Haour – a professor of African studies and medieval archaeology– and "if born a blacksmith one will always be a blacksmith". Non-blacksmith castes of Zaghawa neither eat nor associate with the blacksmith castes. The lowest strata has been the slaves. The social stratification and castes such as for the leatherworker strata within the Zaghawa people is similar to those found in nearby Fur people.

== Southern Africa ==
=== Merina people ===
The Merina people are the largest ethnic group in Madagascar. They historically have had a highly stratified caste system. The Merina society emerged in the 15th century in the central high plateau region of Madagascar. Its society, like many ethnic groups in Africa, had two category of people, the free locally called the fotsy, and the serfs or mainty. These were divided into three strata: the Andriana (nobles), the Hova (freemen), and the lowest strata called Andevo (slaves).

Each strata was hierarchically subdivided. The Andriana are divided into six sub-strata, for example, each had an inherited occupation, and were endogamous.

The nineteenth century records show that Andevo or slaves were imported black Africans, and they constituted about a third of the Merina society. The Merina society sold highland slaves to both Muslim and European slave traders on Madagascar coast, as well as bought East African and Mozambique-sourced slaves from them for their own plantations between 1795 and 1895. Marriage and any sexual relations between the upper strata fotsy and the lower strata mainty were a taboo. According to a 2012 report by Gulnara Shahinian – the United Nations' Special Rapporteur on contemporary forms of slavery, the descendants of former slave castes continue to suffer in contemporary Madagascar Merina society, and inter-caste marriages continue to be socially ostracized.

== Chronology ==
The caste systems in Africa have been linked to the a pre-developed trading network, invasions from North Africa and the Middle East after the 7th century, followed by a slavery system that targeted the pagans. According to Susan McIntosh – a professor of anthropology specializing in African societies–archeological evidence shows that Arabs and Berbers had expanded and established an integrated sub-Saharan trade and transport network with West Africa, building upon the pre-existing trade routes through Western Sudan. This trade by 9th to 10th centuries, states McIntosh, included commodities and slaves. The reach of slave trading had extended into the Ghana Empire by the 11th century, and the slave raiding, capture, holding and trading systems became increasingly sophisticated in 13th and 14th century Mali Empire and 16th century Songhai Empire.

As the practice of slavery grew, so did the caste system. Tamari suggests that a corollary of the rising slavery system was the development and growth of the caste system among numerous ethnic groups of Africa by about the 13th century. McIntosh concurs with Tamari's reasoning approach, but disagrees with the dating. McIntosh states that the emergence of caste systems likely occurred much earlier in the West African societies such as Soninke, Mande, Malinke, Wolof, and others. She places the development and spread of castes in these societies to about the 10th century, because the slave capture, slave trade and slave holding by elite families was an established institution in West Africa by then, and slavery created a template for servile relationships and social stratification of human beings.

The linguistic evidence suggests that stratification structure and words relating to caste system and slavery likely were shared between the many ethnic groups, and possibly some others such as the Dogon people of West Africa. However, the linguistic differences between the caste and slave systems between Soninke and northern ethnic groups of Africa such as the Tuareg people and Moors suggests that these evolved separately.

== Comparison between castes of Africa and South Asia ==
Louis Dumont, the 20th-century author famous for his classic Homo Hierarchicus, recognized the social stratification among the ethnic groups in West Africa, but suggested that sociologists should invent a new term for West African social stratification system. Other scholars consider this a bias and isolationist because the West African system shares all elements in Dumont's system, including economic, ritual, spiritual, endogamous, elements of pollution, segregative and spread over a large region. According to Anne Haour – a professor of African studies – some scholars consider the historic caste-like social stratification among African communities to be a pre-Islamic feature while others consider it to be derived from Arab influence.

== See also ==
- Caste system in India
  - Caste-related violence in India
