= Somali clans =

Clans of Somalia

Somali clans (Somali: Qabaa'ilka Soomaalida; Arabic: القبائل الصومالية, romanized: al-Qabā'il al-Sūmāliyya) are patrilineal kinship groups based on agnatic descent of the Somali people.

Tradition and folklore connects the origin of the Somali population by language and way of life, and societal organisations, by customs, and by a feeling of belonging to a broader family among individuals from the Arabian Peninsula.

Somalis are a Muslim ethnoreligious group native to the Horn of Africa. Predominantly of Cushitic ancestry, they are segmented into clan groupings which are important kinship units that play a central part in Somali culture and politics. Clan families are patrilineal and are divided into clans, primary lineages or subclans, and dia-paying kinship groups. The clan symbolise the utmost kinship level. It possesses territorial properties and is commonly governed by a Sultan. Primary lineages are directly derived from the clans, and are exogamous political entities with no officially appointed leader. They constitute the division level that an individual typically indicates they are affiliated with, with the founding forefather reckoned to between six and ten generations.

The Somali people are mainly divided among five patrilineal clans, the Hawiye, Darod, Rahanweyn, Dir, and Isaaq. The average person is able to trace their ancestry generations back. Somali clans in contemporary times have an established official structure in the country's political system, acknowledged by a mathematical formula for equitably distributing seats between the clans in the Federal Parliament of Somalia.

Somali clans were founded by various patriarchs who came to Africa following the emergence of Islam, and they are linked to the propagation of the religion in the Somali Peninsula. The traditions of descent from noble forefathers from Quraysh set the Somalis further apart from other neighbouring ethnic groups.

== Structure ==
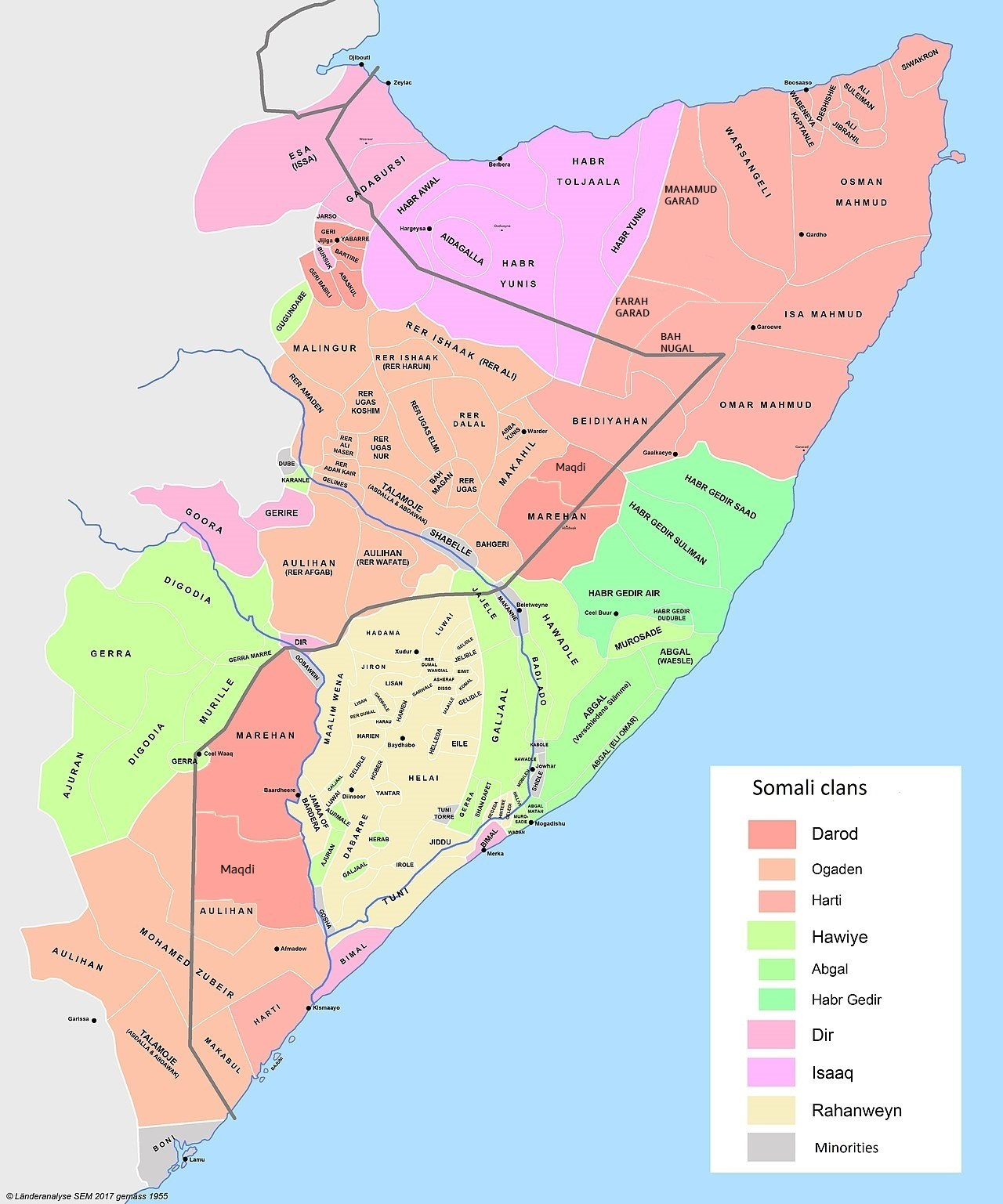
Distribution of the Somali clans in the Horn of Africa.

Somalis historically inhabit a region that extends from the Indian Ocean to the elevated terrains of eastern Ethiopia, and from the Gulf of Aden to the northern regions of Kenya. They represent the most extensive demographic within the Horn of Africa.

From an ethnological perspective, Somalis are classified as living in a segmentary society. This classification indicates that they are subdivided into numerous segments or lineages predicated upon genealogical proximity to a shared ancestor. Layered in all aspects of life, the clan is both a tool for identification and a way of life. Clans define in practice the relationships between all people and actors in Somalia.

The principal organising tenet of the Somali clan system is the concept of patrilineal descent, referred to locally as 'Abtirsi' (lit. 'the counting of fathers'), derived from the Afroasiatic cognate for father, Ab and Tirsi, a Somali term for 'the counting of'. This notion encapsulates a minimal yet collectively recognised framework for understanding the structure and the hierarchy of genealogical relationships among the Somalis, ranging from the four primary clan families to their respective sub-lineages, which represent the most basic acknowledged units.

“It will now be clear that a Somali genealogy is not only a family tree conserving the historical origins of a group. In the sphere of politics, its significance lies in the fact that it represents the political affiliations of individuals and groups. By reference to his ancestors, a man’s relations with others are defined — or at least circumscribed.”

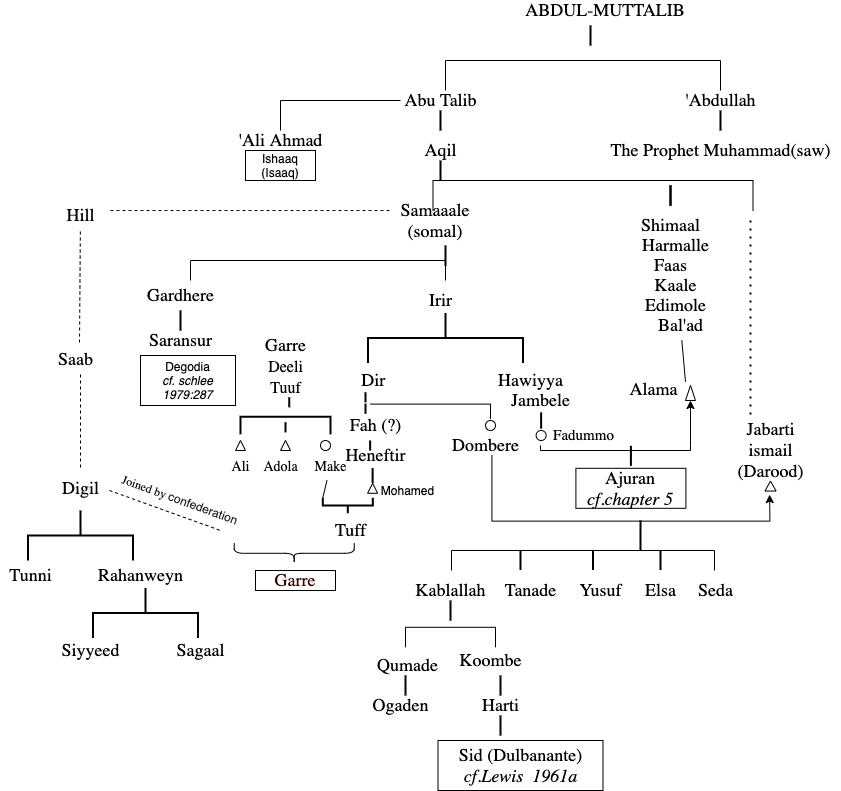
Genealogical tree of Somali clans

The Somali concept of ‘Abtirsi’ refers to a systematically organized lineage-based registry or list of paternal ancestors among Somalis. This lineage starts with the individual’s father and extends to include the grandfather, great-grandfather, and so forth, ultimately culminating at the patriarch of the broader clan-family from which the individual is descended. Although it is feasible to trace lineage beyond this juncture, the patriarch of the clan family, typically an Islamic sheikh denoting the importance of Islam, usually represents the terminus of such genealogical lines. Occasionally, this genealogy may also incorporate 'uterine' connections, which are grouped descendants of the male progenitor through a female spouse, thereby indicating the alliances formed by the descendants of that male ancestor by virtue of a shared mother.

The Somali clan system is structured hierarchically, with five primary tiers of divisions (tol) identified, commencing from the top: the clan-family; the clans; the sub-clans; the lineages; and the sub-lineages or dia-paying groups. Within the latter category, additional levels may be delineated. Over time, the parameters of inclusion undergo alterations, whereby sub-lineages may evolve into lineages. This is attributable to the fluctuations in the growth and decline of lineages and clans. As time progresses and demographic changes transpire, new units may emerge (diverge) from pre-existing ones, while earlier entities are condensed, a process that involves concentrating attention exclusively on prominent individuals within one's genealogical framework often referred to as 'Telescoping'.

"The idea that the relationships must be there if only one can establish them is very powerful. It has the compelling force that great simplifying ideas have: it is so logical that it must be true" (Virginia Luling; 2006: 474)

— Virginia Luling

The terms 'clan-family', 'clan', 'sub-clan', or 'lineage' lack universally recognized equivalents in the Somali language. They are predominantly 'emic' formal designations. Consequently, this may give rise to a growing degree of ambiguity regarding the intermediate segmentation for external observers. Among Somalis, the term for clan is frequently denoted by the Arabic word 'Qabiil'. Thus, some individuals may perceive the endeavor of constructing a comprehensive Somali genealogy as misdirected or fruitless. Conversely, others may find themselves motivated to contemplate the intricacies of clan-line classification or to investigate historical and contemporary relationships among clans, clan names, and their intermingling and amalgamation as influenced by historical and socio-political dynamics.

"Somalis themselves are very much busy with this idea and cherish it as a cultural ideology."

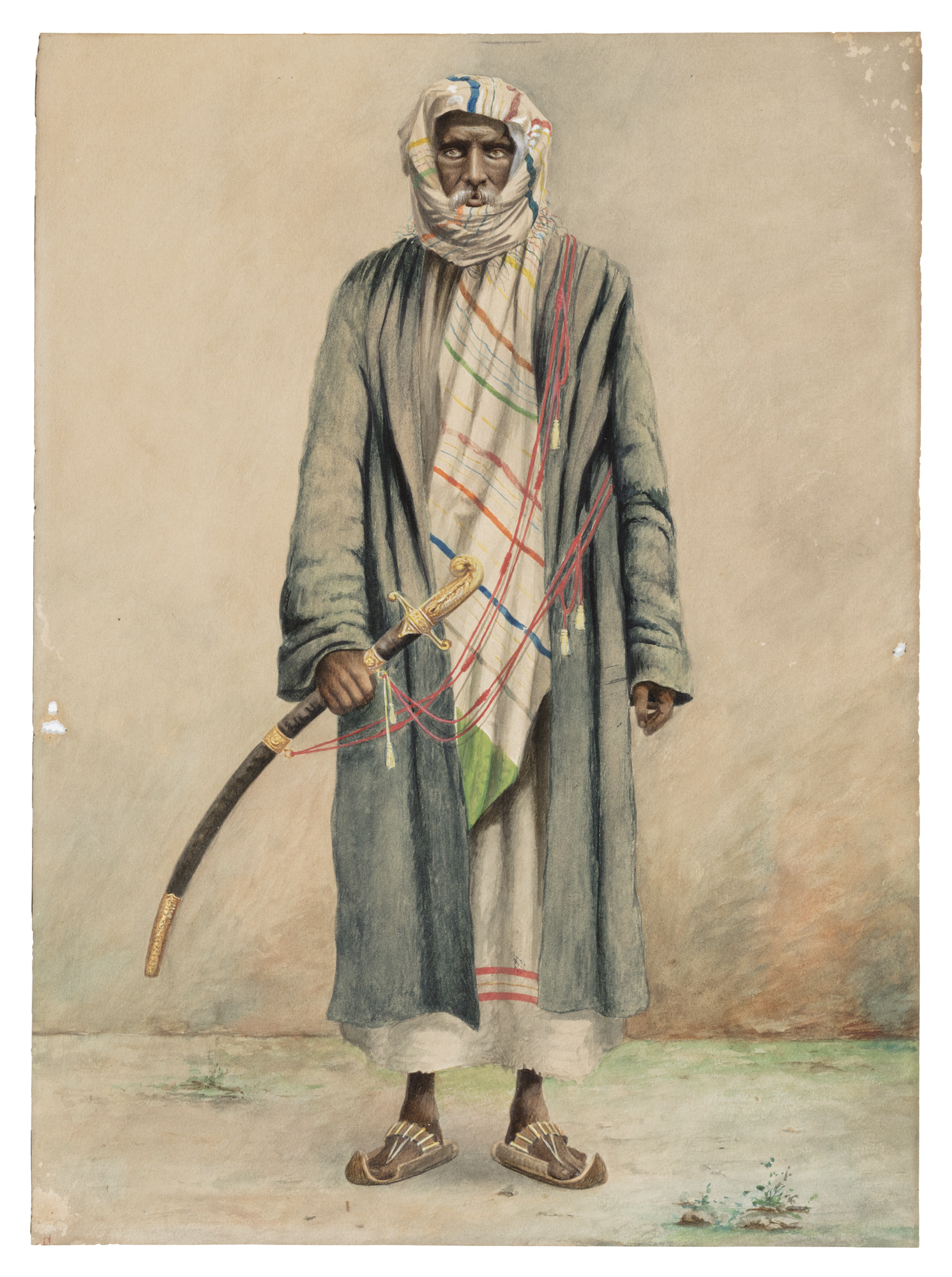
Painting of a portrait of Somali Sultan Yusuf Ali Kenadid by Luigi Robecchi Bricchetti.

The clan represents the highest degree of familial affiliation. It holds territorial properties and is typically overseen by a Sultan. Clans possess ancestral lands, which are associated with the migratory patterns of the Somali populace throughout their historical narrative. Each clan is administered by its designated leader and supported by its council of elders, with land being communally owned and overseen. Various Somali clans utilise distinct titles for their leaders, including Sultan, Emir, Imam, Ughaz, and Garad. Clan leadership may be hereditary, or leaders may be elected by the council of elders composed of representatives from diverse clan lineages. The leaders of these clans fulfill both religious and political responsibilities. Although a historically ingrained socio-cognitive 'schema' exists among many Somalis concerning lineage, which delineates the various clan groups and 'tribes' that occupied specific territories and held (historical) claims therein, constructing an accurate genealogical tree would be unfeasible due to several factors, including the aforementioned 'telescoping.'

Somalis maintain a traditional attachment to territories where their kin are presumed to be more populous. To this day, the majority of Somalis still depend on patrilineal clan relatives for assistance and identification. The degree of assistance rendered by one's clan is contingent upon the level of segmentation. At the more advanced levels of segmentation, particularly at the clan-family tier, there is no longer a guarantee of cohesion or collective action in particular instances. In contemporary Somalia, the clan system exists in tandem with modern forms of societal and political organization. The reconfiguration and reassignment of responsibilities from traditional leaders to the judiciary, such as customary norms and laws, have altered the status and role of leaders within their communities. The Somali clan system is often referred to as an obstacle to the state building efforts in Somalia. The reasoning is aptly captured in this famous Somali proverb:

"Me and my clan against the world; Me and my family against my clan; Me and my brother against my family; Me against my brother."

Certain clans are traditionally classified as noble, referring to their pastoralist way of life, which contrasts with the more sedentary, agro-pastoral communities referred to as Sab. The principal noble clans include the Dir, Darod, Hawiye, and Isaaq. Among these, the Dir and Hawiye trace their agnatic paternal lineage to Samaale, the likely source of the ethnonym Somali, Hawiye descending from Ahmed Bin Abdulrahman Bin Uthman. In contrast, the Darod and Isaaq have separate agnatic traditions of descent from Abdirahman bin Isma'il al-Jabarti and Ishaaq bin Ahmed respectively.

According to oral tradition, Sheikh Darod and Sheikh Ishaaq are asserted to have married women from the Dir clan, thus establishing matrilateral ties with the Samaale main stem. The term Sab refers to agricultural clans such as the Rahanweyn, in contrast to Samaale. Both Samaale and Sab are the children of the father "Hiil" who is the common ancestor of all Somali clans.

== Kinship ==
The traditional political unit among the Somali people has been kinships. Dia-paying groups are groupings of a few small lineages, each consisting of a few hundred to a few thousand members. They trace their foundation to between four and eight generations. Members are socially contracted to support each other in jural and political duties, including paying or receiving dia or blood compensation (mag in Somali). Compensation is obligatory in regards to actions committed by or against a dia-paying group, including blood-compensation in the event of damage, injury or death.

== Social stratification ==
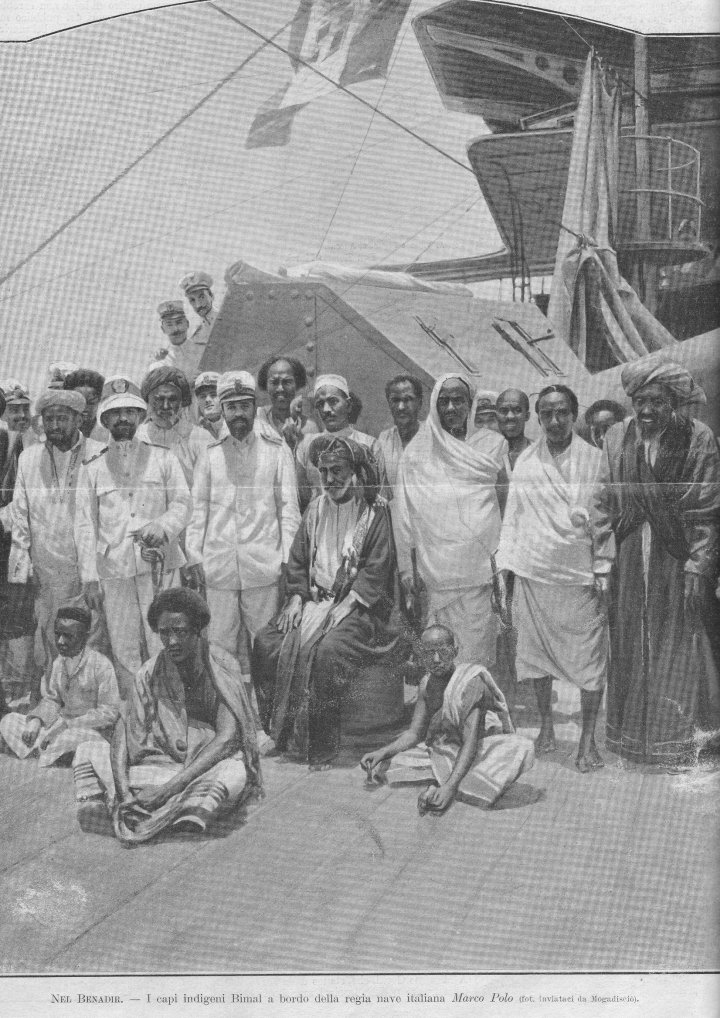
Bimaal elders along with the Bimaal Sultan Ali on board the Marco Polo.

Traditional Somali society, like that of other ethnic groups in the Horn of Africa and the wider region, has long exhibited a system of social stratification. Historian Donald Levine identifies this structure as comprising high-ranking clans, low-ranking clans, caste groups, and slaves. This rigid hierarchy and concepts of lineal purity contrast with the relative egalitarianism in clan leadership and political control.

Noble clans, the Samaale, constituted the upper tier and were known as bilis. The lower tier are the Sab, and are distinguished by their heterogeneous constitution and agropastoral lifestyle as well as some linguistic and cultural differences. The primary distinction between the noble clans and the Sab lies in their lineage structures. The Samaale clans are characterized by their linear purity, tracing descent through a single, unbroken paternal line to a common ancestor, which reinforces their cohesion and social prestige, in contrast to the Sab, who constitute a confederation of multiple, often unrelated lineages brought together through alliance, shared lifestyle, or geographic proximity.

A third stratum within the Somali caste system consisted of artisanal groups, defined by their hereditary occupations and endogamy. Among these groups, the Midgan traditionally served as hunters and performed circumcisions. The Tumal (also spelled Tomal) were smiths and leatherworkers, and the Yibir (also spelled Yebir) were the tanners.

Anthropologist Virginia Luling notes that the northern artisanal caste groups shared the same ethnic origins as their higher-caste kinsmen, closely resembling them in appearance and generally exhibiting the same Caucasoid features typical of ethnic Somalis. Despite this common ancestry and lack of ethnic distinction, noble clans have historically stigmatized these lower status groups, primarily due to their association with occupations considered socially degrading or ritually impure.

Outside the Somali caste system existed enslaved populations of Bantu origin, whose distinct physiognomy and occupational roles set them apart from ethnic Somalis and reinforced their marginal status within the social hierarchy. Ethiopians, especially the Amhara and Tigrayan were also captured and sold to traders from Arabia, India, Greece, and beyond. Oromo subjects were favored due to their features compared to other slaves.

To satisfy the demands of the market for agricultural produce in the Arabian Peninsula and cater to the local needs, Somali clans in the Lower Shabelle region and along the ancient Banaadir coast began the procurement of Bantu slaves from Arab slave traders to provide labor and serve as client farmers for the Somali clans. The primarily Pastoralist clans surrounding the inter-riverine areas settled down not to farm, but to acquire slaves as agricultural laborers. With the growth of the plantation sector, pastoralists could convert part of their wealth in livestock to wealth in slaves, produce for a market, and earn a cash income to reinvest in the pastoral sector.

"The farming was performed by local client-farmers, boon, or low status groups of the dominant Biimaal, Geledle, Hintirre, Murosade, Mobileyn and other predominantly pastoral clans which had established control of small portions of the valley. They produced mainly to serve local markets. Ample, fertile land remained uncultivated, due to a chronic shortage of farm labor. In order to respond to market demands for grain in South Arabia, the local Somali clans of the Lower Shabelle began purchasing slaves from Arab and Swahili slave ships. These slaves came first from Zanzibar (the Zegua or Mushunguli people)."

== Law ==
The customary justice system of Somalis, known as xeer, holds a significant position among the Somali clans, serving as a crucial mechanism for resolving conflicts. Somali clans are organized according to a patriarchal clan-based framework, which is further segmented into sub-clans, lineages, and mag groupings. These groupings are united through familial bonds or contractual agreements. Xeer justice primarily centers around the latter groupings, given their smaller size. Within these units, every member is held accountable for the actions of others and thus shares a portion of any imposed punishment. Under this system, only the victim or their immediate family has the authority to initiate criminal proceedings through xeer mediation. Xeer relies on clan elders who utilize precedent, Sharia law, and mutual verbal agreements between clans to settle disputes and provide resolutions.

== Patronage system ==
The Somali Abban system (lit. 'patron' or 'protector') is a system in Somali society that structured cross clan interactions and dealings with outsiders, especially merchants and foreign travelers. It functioned as a system of tutelage and brokerage, in which a local clan member, known as the Abban, acted as the formal intermediary between a guest, mainly traders or envoys. It ensured safe passage, negotiation of rights, and commercial facilitation across clan boundaries. This arrangement was not optional; it was obligatory and universally observed. No foreigner or non local Somali could operate, move, or conduct trade in Somali territory without securing an Abban, whose role was not only customary but enforced by collective social expectation. Ibn Battuta wrote of his travels to Mogadishu:

"The host then sells his goods for him and buys for him, and if anyone buys anything from him at too low a price or sells to him in the absence of his host, the sale is regarded by them as invalid."

Functionally, the Abban served as an escort, broker, interpreter, and agent for facilitating trade and negotiations, managing all affairs on behalf of his client, from introducing them to clan elders and Sultans, to overseeing every transaction and ensuring the client’s protection. The Abban was also the referee in disputes, holding the authority to negotiate settlements or represent the client in cases of conflict. This extensive role gave the Abban considerable power, as he received a fixed percentage from all commercial dealings and often extracted additional payments from his own clan members during the process. His lodging and food were provided by the guest, and without his permission, a traveler could neither make a march nor purchase any necessary item. Though often viewed with suspicion by foreign observers due to the lack of checks on the Abban’s conduct, the system was seen as indispensable and could not be waived at the whim of a visitor. It was, in essence, the earliest form of transit dues, a cost embedded in the structure of access and mobility.

"It is naturally in the interest of the Abban to mediate as many transactions as possible for his protégé. He meets caravans on the road, establishes relationships with the merchants along the way, and obliges them with promises to sell their goods through him."

Beyond economic matters, the Abban assumed personal and collective responsibility for the safety of his client and their property. As a member of the host, usually the dominant clan in the region where they passed, his protection extended the force of collective clan honor; an attack on the traveler or their caravan was seen as an attack on the Abban’s genealogical unit, his clan, and could therefore trigger inter clan retaliation. In return, the Abban was bound to fight the battles of his client, if necessary, and if he were killed in the process, his tribe was expected to avenge him and compensate the client’s losses. If the client suspected theft, then the Abban would initiate a trial over the suspect. However the client would have to first pay a certain amount as honorarium. This aspect made the system not only a practical arrangement but a morally binding pact grounded in Somali notions of collective responsibility and clan solidarity. The underlying principle of Abbanage therefore rested on a relational logic of mediation, where one party assumed responsibility for managing the outsider’s integration, however temporary it was, into the existing moral and legal framework of Somali society.

The Abban system was not only a mechanism of protection and mediation, but also a lucrative source of wealth for those who occupied the role. Given the commissions from trade, the provision of lodging and food at the guest’s expense, and the expectation of gifts or gratuities, serving as an Abban could bring significant material benefit. As a result, many Abbans cultivated long term relationships with visiting merchants, and in most cases, a merchant would return to the same Abban in future visits.

== Marriage ==
Wedding of the Raxanweyn Geledi Emir of Luuq.

Among Somali clans, in order to strengthen alliance ties, marriage is often to another ethnic Somali from a different clan. In a study of 89 marriages focusing on the Dhulbahante sub-clan, anthropologist I. M. Lewis noted that 62% were with women from the same clan but from differing subclans other than those of their husbands and 33.7% were with women of adjacent clans of other clan families 4.3% were with women of other clans of the same clan family.

Such exogamy is always followed by the dia-paying group and usually adhered to by the primary lineage, whereas marriage to lineal kin falls within the prohibited range. These traditional strictures against consanguineous marriage ruled out the patrilateral first cousin marriages that are favored by Arab Bedouins and specially approved by Islam. These marriages were practiced to a limited degree by certain northern Somali subclans. In areas inhabited by diverse clans, such as the southern Mogadishu area, endogamous marriages also served as a means of ensuring clan solidarity in uncertain socio-political circumstances. This inclination was further spurred on by intensified contact with Arab society in the Gulf, wherein first cousin marriage was preferred. Although politically expedient, such endogamous marriage created tension with the traditional principles within Somali culture.

== Major clans ==
=== Isaaq ===
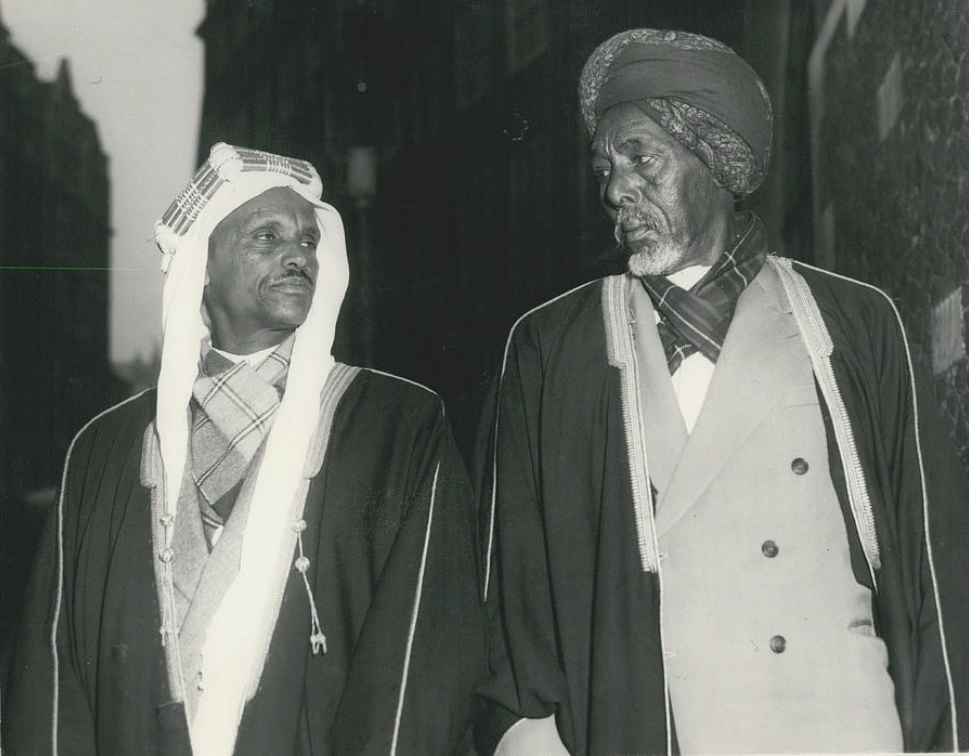
Isaaq Sultans Abdillahi Deria and Abdulrahman Deria in London 1955 to petition for the Haud Reserve Area

The Isaaq (also Ishaq) (Somali: Reer Sheekh Isxaaq; Arabic: اسحاق) are a major Somali clan family. It is one of the largest Somali clan families in the Horn of Africa, with a large and densely populated traditional territory. The Isaaq people claim in a traditional legend to have descended from Sheikh Ishaaq bin Ahmed, an Islamic scholar who traveled to Somaliland in the 12th or 13th century and married two women; one from the local Dir clan and the other from the neighboring Harari people. He is said to have sired eight sons who are the common ancestors of the clans of the Isaaq clan-family. He remained in Maydh until his death. Somali genealogical tradition places the origin of the Isaaq tribe in the 12th or 13th century with the arrival of Ishaaq Bin Ahmed (Sheikh Ishaaq) from Arabia. Sheikh Ishaaq purportedly settled in the coastal town of Maydh in modern-day northeastern Somaliland. Hence, Sheikh Ishaaq married two local women in Somaliland, which left him with eight sons. The Isaaq are typically grouped under the Dir.

=== Darod ===
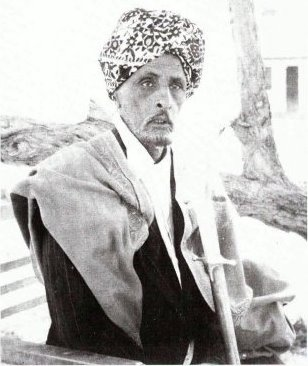
Mohamoud Ali Shire, ruler of the Warsangali Sultanate. Warsangali are a subclan of the Darod.

The Darod (Somali: Daarood, Arabic: دارود) are a Somali clan. The forefather of this clan is Sheikh Abdirahman bin Isma'il al-Jabarti, more commonly known as Daud or Darod. According to early Islamic books and Somali tradition, Aqeel Abu Talib ibn Abd al-Muttalib Al-Qurashi descendant Abdirahman bin Isma'il al-Jabarti (Darod), a son of the Sufi Sheikh Isma'il al-Jabarti of the Qadiriyyah order, fled his homeland in the Arabian Peninsula after an argument with his uncle. During the 10th or 11th century CE, Abdirahman is believed to have then settled in modern-day Sanaag just across the Red Sea and married Dobira, the daughter of the Dir clan chief. This union is said to have given rise to the Darod clan family. Thus, it established matrilateral ties with the Samaale main stem. Darod is the son of the famous Arabian Sheikh, Ismail bin Ibrahim Al-Jabarti, who is buried in the Zabid District of Yemen.

=== Dir ===
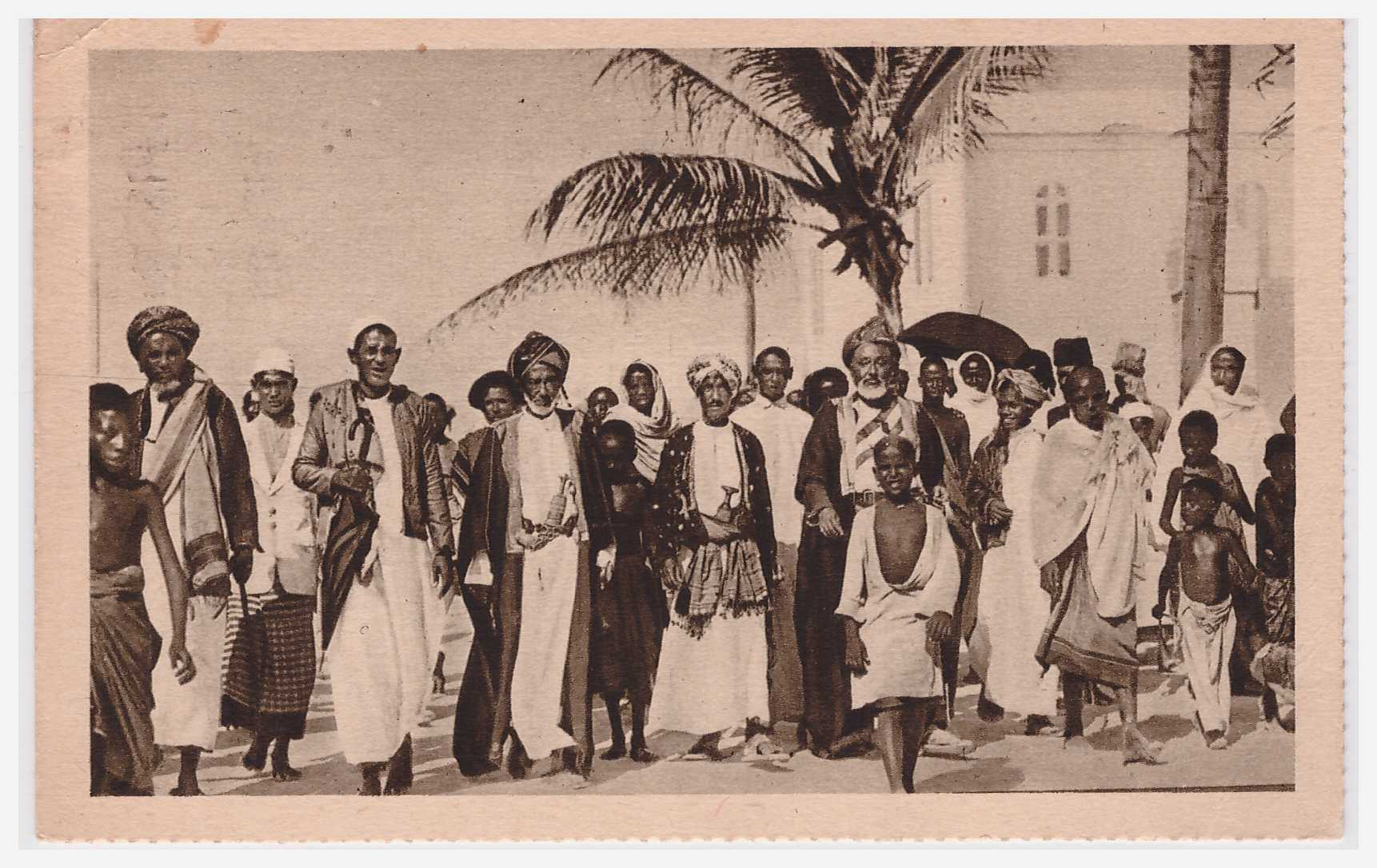
Notable elders belonging to the Bimal clan of the Dir clan family.

The Dir (Somali: Dir) are one of the largest and most prominent Somali clans in the Horn of Africa. They are descended from Hawiye's brother Aji, whose actual name is documented in oral traditions and further supported by Al Idrus's work "History of Somalia" as Ismail. Dir, also known as Abu-Bakr, is regarded as the father-in-law of Darod, the progenitor of the Darod clan as well as Sheikh Isaaq.

=== Hawiye ===
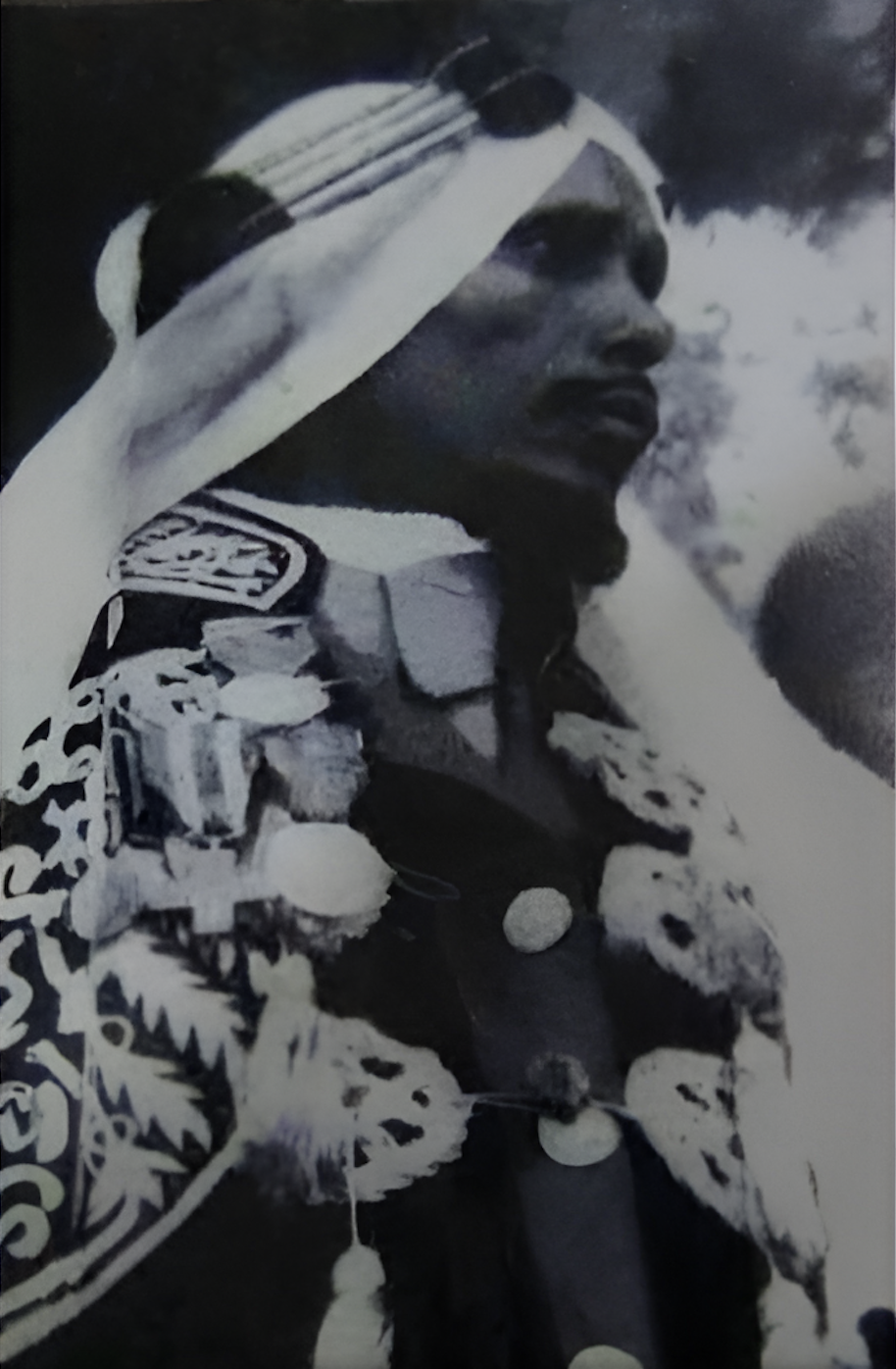
Sultan Olol Dinle of the Hawiye Ajuran Sultanate.

The Hawiye (Somali: Hawiye; Arabic: بنو هوية) are one of the principal and largest of the Somali clans, tracing their lineage back to Sheikh Ahmed Bin Abdulrahman Bin Uthman, also known as Sheikh Hawiye, the eponymous figure of the clan. They are considered the earliest documented clan to have settled in the Somali peninsula, as noted in the 12th century by Al-Idrisi, occupying the regions spanning from Ras Hafun to Merca, which served as their capital. Sheikh Hawiye, also known as Ahmed based on oral traditions and Arabic hagiologies, is renowned as a revered saint and religious figure who bore the epithet "Hawi al 'Uluum", meaning the conservator of knowledge, denoting his mastery of Islamic knowledge. Through the passage of time, this appellation was condensed to just "Hawiyah" or "Hawiye" and subsequently evolved into the ethnonym of his progeny. The genealogy of Sheikh Hawiye, as delineated in these oral narratives, Arabic hagiologies, and indigenous manuscripts, can be traced as follows: Ahmed (Hawiye) Bin Abdulrahman (Irir) Bin Uthman (Samaale) Bin Muhammed Bin Hanbal Bin Mahdi Bin Ahmed Bin Mohammed Bin Aqeel Bin Abu Talib. The tomb of Shiekh Hawiye can be found in Qundhuro, situated within the Haraghe region, which served as his primary residence for the later years of his life as a revered Sheikh who dedicated himself to the propagation of the teachings of Islam. Alongside Shiekh Hawiye rests his eldest son, Karanle, in a burial site. The Hawiye furthered the spread of Islam in the Horn of Africa.

=== Rahanweyn ===
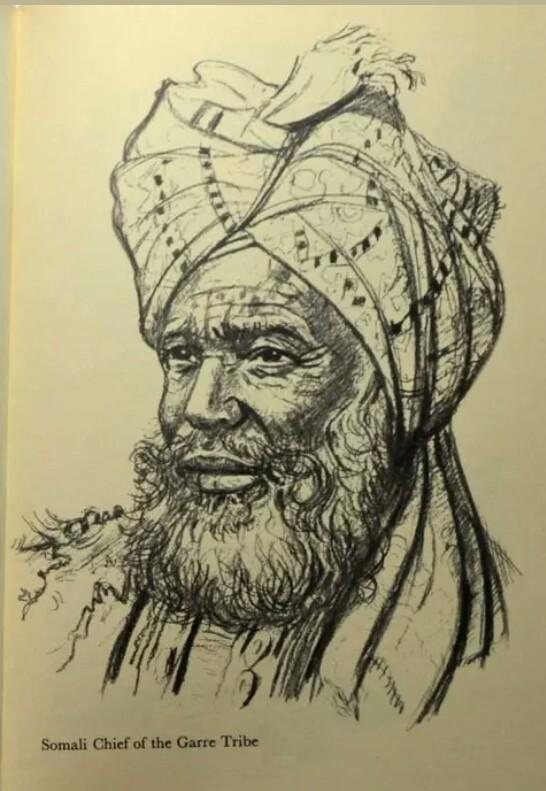
Sultan of the Rahanweyn Garre clan

The Rahanweyn (Maay: Reewin, Somali: Raxanweyn, Arabic: رحنوين), also known as the Digil and Mirifle (Somali: Digil iyo Mirifle) is a major Somali clan. It is one of the major Somali clans in the Horn of Africa, with a large territory in the densely populated fertile valleys of the Jubba and Shebelle rivers and the areas inbetween, which are mainly inhabited by settlers from the Digil and Mirifle lineages.

The name Rahanweyn derives from the name of the ancestor of all Rahanweyn clans, one Ma'd or Mohammed Reewin.

== See also ==
- Benadiri people
