= Muse (clan) =

Somali clan family

Muuse موسى
- Somali clan
- Ethnicity: (Somalia) Somali
- Location: (Somalia) Somalia; Ethiopia; Djibouti
- Descended from: Shaykh Muse
- Population: Unknown
- Branches: Harun Muse; Abokor Muse
- Language: (Somalia) Somali (Arab League) Arabic
- Religion: Sunni Islam

The Muse clan (Somali: Reer Sheekh Muuse) is a Somali clan. Group members live in Somaliland, Ethiopia, Djibouti, and Yemen.

== History ==
Muse was the father of the clan. He was an early follower of the prophet Mohammed. According to his progeny, Shaykh Muse arrived at the coastal land of Somaliland, Mitte, or Maydh. He came from Hadramaut, Yemen. It is believed that his grave is close to Sheikh Isaaq's tomb in Maydh.

It is believed that his biography was lost after his history had been disregarded. Today Shaykh Muse is reputed to be the ancestor of the clan named after him and who venerate him once every year. Sheikh Muse is among the Shaykhs who are venerated in Somaliland and professional shoemaker, haircut, and metalsmith groups also venerate him.

== Clan Tree ==
- Muse
  - Harun Muse
    - Cabdulle Haruun Muuse
      - Rooble
        - Biniin
        - Fahiye
        - Sharmarke
      - Aden
        - Diriye
        - Farrax
      - Caamir Abdulle
        - Sayre Caamir
        - Ismacil Camir
      - Abiib Abdulle
        - Xagga Abiib
        - Yusuf Abiib
      - Bashane Abdulle
        - Qabile Bashan
        - Qadiid Bashan
    - Talaabacae
      - Liiban
      - Ceeleey
      - Odowaa
      - Reer Xildiid
      - Reer Cismaan
      - Reer Dhible
      - Reer Lowge
      - Reer Cilayo (Gureyow)
  - Abokor Muse
    - Jibriil Abokor Muuse
      - Cali Jibril
      - Gambool Jibril
      - Seed-Gaboobe JIbril
    - Osman Abokor Muuse
      - Alamagan Osman
      - Amaadin Osman
      - Shiil Osman

== Notable people ==
- Suldan Abdi Ismail - Suldan of Muse
- Suldan Mohammed Suldan Abdi Ismail - Suldan of Muse
- Sacid Mohammed Mohammud - senator for Federal Parliament of Somalia
- Hussein Ibrahim Buni - vice Minister for the planning of Somaliland
- Mahdi Haji Osman - vice Minister for the health of Somaliland
- Cumar Dhuule - Musician
