= Madhiban =

Gabooye clan family

Madhibaan مطيبان
- Somali/Gabooye clan
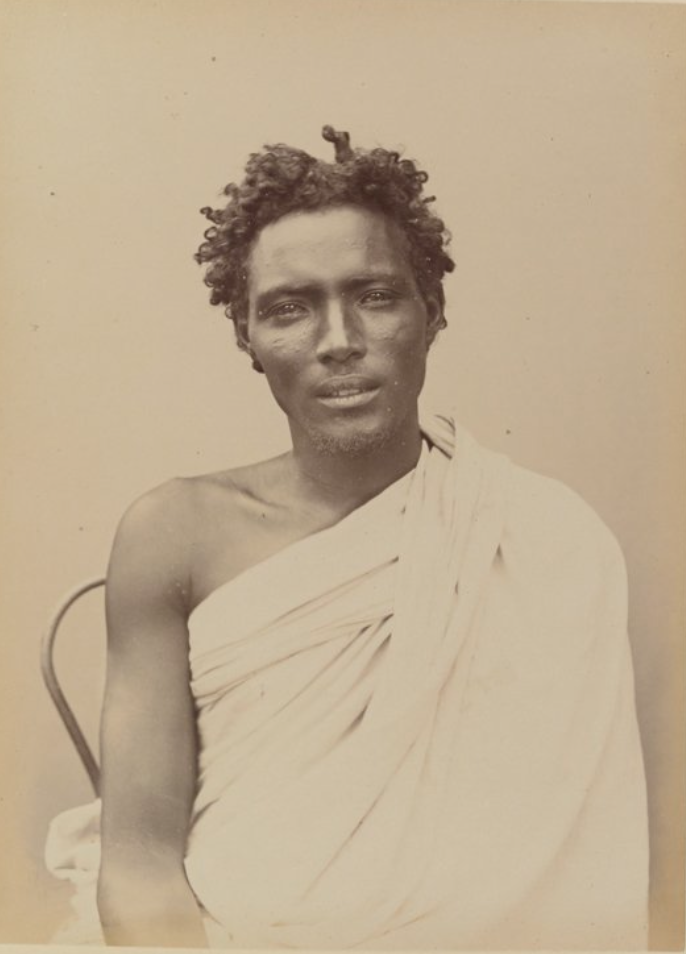
- Hassan Hersi was a 30-year-old Madhibaan man from northern Somalia in 1880.
- Ethnicity: (Somalia) Somali
- Location: Somalia Puntland Djibouti Ethiopia Kenya
- Descended from: Sheikh Madhibe
- Parent tribe: Madhiban
- Branches: Hildiid; Omar; Hussein; Aadan; Mahaad Barre; Si‘id; Sa‘ad; Geedi; Kheyr; Aarsade; Huffane
- Language: (Somalia) Somali (Arab League) Arabic
- Religion: Sunni Islam

The Madhiban (Somali: Madhibaan; Arabic: مطيبان, also spelled ماديبان; alternate spellings: Madeban, Madebaan, Madebban) are a socially and historically marginalized community primarily distributed across the Horn of Africa, with significant populations in northern Somalia (Somaliland, Puntland, and northeastern regions) and communities throughout the Somali-speaking territories of eastern Ethiopia and Djibouti. Scholars from the early twentieth century to the present — including Renato Biasutti, Enrico Cerulli, I. M. Lewis, and Hawa Y. Mire — have proposed that the Madhiban descend from populations that inhabited the region prior to the arrival of Somali nomadic pastoralist groups.

== Identity and Origins ==
The name "Madhibaan" derives from Qof Madhibaan, meaning "the one who doesn't bother others," and traces the clan's paternal lineage to a forefather known as Sheikh Madhibe — it is the community's own name for itself, not a term later adopted in response to "Midgaan," a term entrenched and administratively applied to them under British colonial rule — including in the British Somaliland administration's own 1944 genealogical survey of the protectorate's tribes — and widely regarded as offensive within the community."

The Madhibaan are one of several distinct clans historically grouped under the broader term Gaboye, alongside the Tumaal, the Yibir (also known as Anas), and the Muuse Diriye (also rendered Muse Deriye or Musse Dhariyo). Drawing on Madhibaan oral tradition and colonial-era ethnographic sources, some researchers hold that the Madhibaan and other Gaboye groups descend from hunter-gatherer (indigenous) populations who inhabited the region before the arrival of Somali nomadic pastoralist clans — a claim consistent with the broader anthropological understanding that hunting-and-gathering subsistence generally preceded pastoralism and agriculture.

Historically, the Madhiban practiced hunting, foraging, leatherworking, and traditional crafts as distinct livelihoods, separate from the pastoral livestock economy that defines Somalia's major clan families. They maintain a distinct cultural and linguistic identity, including the use of Af-Caloowe, a sociolect with vocabulary and practices separate from standard Somali.

For centuries, the Madhiban have faced systematic exclusions including restrictions on intermarriage with other Somali communities, exclusion from clan-based protection and arbitration systems (xeer), and social subordination codified in customary law. Despite this marginalization, the Madhiban have maintained their distinct communities and cultural practices across centuries of social and political change, and are increasingly recognized as a distinct cultural and historical group within the Horn of Africa.

Madhiban oral traditions recount narratives of historical displacement and subordination by expanding pastoral societies. Enrico Cerulli, writing in 1959, documented a theory first proposed by Renato Biasutti, suggesting that communities like the Madhiban may represent remnants of pre-Cushitic populations predating the Somali pastoral expansion.

== Madhiban (also known as Gaboye or Baidari) ==
The Madhiban (Madhibaan, also known as Gaboye or Baidari) are a Somali occupational minority group, historically marginalized within Somali society due to their distinct hereditary way of life — traditionally as skilled hunters, artisans, ironworkers, and traditional surgeons and doctors — which set them apart from the region's dominant pastoralist clans. Drawing on generations of knowledge from their traditional hunting grounds, the Madhiban developed expertise in both poison and healing derived from local plants, using arrow poisons made from species such as Acocanthera schimperi and Adenium somalense for hunting, while also applying plant-based knowledge to treat wounds, poisonings, and illness.They are scattered throughout the Horn of Africa, with the majority residing in the northern part of Somalia (Somaliland, North Eastern and Puntland) .

Some scholars have proposed that the Madhiban and other Gaboye groups descend from populations present in the Horn of Africa prior to the region's nomadic Somali pastoralist expansion, though this hypothesis remains a subject of ongoing scholarly debate.

== Colonial Restrictions on Hunting ==
In 1907, the British colonial administration in Somaliland enacted legislation restricting hunting to address overhunting concerns, followed by the establishment of two large game reserves in 1912.

Traditional Madhiban hunting technology included the use of poisoned arrows, tipped with toxins derived from plants such as Acocanthera schimperi and Adenium somalense. This same botanical expertise was also applied medically, both in treating poisoning in humans and livestock and in other traditional remedies (see § Medical history, below).

In March 1901 correspondence to the Marquess of Lansdowne, then Secretary of State for Foreign Affairs, the protectorate's Consul-General, J. Hayes Sadler, wrote that the colonial administration was "not yet in a position to prohibit the killing of game by the tribes in the interior, the Midgans [Madhiban] especially," noting that the Madhiban had "been accustomed from time immemorial to live on the proceeds of the chase." In his 1905 report, Governor Swayne similarly argued that Somali hunting had been practiced for centuries without depleting game populations, attributing the more significant decline instead to the proliferation of modern firearms and unregulated hunting by colonial troops and European sportsmen. By contrast, big-game hunter and memoirist Agnes Herbert offered a conflicting account, writing that Somalis themselves bore significant responsibility for historical elephant depletion through ivory hunting — an illustration of how colonial-era sources on this question frequently disagreed and, at times, shaded their accounts for rhetorical effect.

While colonial authorities cited the Madhiban's traditional dependence on hunting as a reason to delay restricting their hunting practices, the same regulatory framework granted hunting licences to British colonial officers, including a "public officer's licence" available to military officers stationed at Aden who traveled to Somaliland for recreational hunting.

== The Akil System and Resource Control During British Colonial Rule ==
The Akil system formed the customary political structure of Somali pastoral society. An Akil was typically a family head who took a leading role in the tribal assemblies (shir), the councils where governance decisions and disputes were adjudicated; his actual influence depended less on the office itself than on his personal standing and the backing of his family. Akils held authority over three interlocking domains critical to pastoral survival: dispute resolution, including administration of the dia (blood money) compensation system, which fixed restitution "for death at a hundred camels for a man, and fifty for a woman"; control over access to scarce water sources and grazing land, since decisions about "fresh grass and rain pools" determined which families could sustain their herds; and broader authority over resource allocation and territorial matters within the clan structure.

Madhibaan and other Gabooye communities were legally barred from holding Akil authority or participating in shir assemblies, despite possessing specialized knowledge — in water location, land navigation, and resource management — that was itself essential to the pastoral economy. This exclusion was formalized through rigid lineage classification: contemporary colonial-era sources record that "in no circumstances is an Aji of either sex allowed to marry into the Sab division," with the Madhibaan and Gabooye classified as Sab, a lineage grouping barred from clan leadership and territorial authority. The British colonial administration governed indirectly through this existing Akil structure rather than reforming it, formalizing what had been customary practice into official colonial policy and thereby tying resource governance to an authority that specialized, knowledge-holding communities were excluded from by lineage alone. A 2026 study by Zakarie Abdi Bade, based on eighteen months of fieldwork and archival research in Hargeisa, argues more specifically that British colonial policy in the early twentieth century disarticulated pre-existing, interconnected Tumaal and Yibir social structures, which he terms "kingdoms" — a claim from a single recent study that has not yet been widely corroborated in the broader literature.

The economic consequences of this exclusion were severe and long-lasting. According to the Immigration and Refugee Board of Canada, occupational castes such as the Gabooye and Madhibaan were traditionally forbidden from owning land and livestock and from participating in local business, the market economy, or politics. The Somaliland National Human Rights Commission has documented the practical effect of this exclusion: minority-clan members were largely restricted to the lowest-paying occupations — street sweeping, shoemaking and shoe repair, blacksmithing, pottery, and circumcision practice — none of which paid enough to support a decent standard of living. These occupations, while low-status, were nonetheless integral to pastoral and urban economies alike; the IRB further notes that members of these occupational groups speak both local dialects of Somali and their own distinct languages, reflecting linguistic and cultural traditions layered onto their specialized economic role. More recently, the same exclusion has taken a different form: many Gabooye and Madhibaan have lost the monopoly they once held over their traditional trades without gaining comparable access to other employment, leaving many in ongoing economic precarity. This erosion of occupational boundaries has not dissolved the underlying stigma, however. Sources indicate that low status among these groups is rooted primarily in the perceived impurity of ancestry rather than in the occupations themselves, with social exclusion reinforced — but not caused — by compounding factors such as low levels of education.

== Madhiban's genealogical relationship to Somali clan ==
According to Somali affairs analyst Joakim Gundel, dominant nomadic Somali clans label minority groups such as the Madhiban are not seen as clans and as part of an effort to assimilate them into the broader clan structure, rather than in recognition of shared descent.

The Madhibaan clan have been historically recognized as distinct from other Somali groups due to their unique lifestyle, which historians characterize as significantly different from the pastoral norm. This includes a hereditary focus on hunting, ironworking, leatherwork, and traditional medicine, along with a specific dialect that exhibits considerable variation in vocabulary compared to standard Somali. Early scholars, including J.W.C. Kirk and Enrico Cerulli, noted that this dialect was historically kept secret from various Somali groups and observed linguistic connections to the af Harlaad language associated with the Harla community. Recently, linguist Roger Blench has verified the dialect's significant lexical divergence from standard Somali. However, he notes that it remains uncertain whether this divergence signifies a separate linguistic origin or an in-group code constructed upon Somali grammar. This intricate interplay of occupational specialization, linguistic uniqueness, and a well-documented history of exclusion from intermarriage and clan privileges has led to the Madhibaan being perceived as socially distinct from the larger Somali population. Some early ethnographers have posited that this distinction is tied to ancestry from peoples predating the region's pastoral expansion, although this hypothesis continues to be a topic of scholarly debate.

The Madhiban are not documented as being genealogically placed within the lineages of Somali nomadic clans, including the Gorgaarte lineage of the Hawiye, and no shared kinship ties are established in the scholarly record. Scholars including Lewis (1999) Instead characterize Gabooye groups — including the Madhiban, Tumaal, and Yibir — as historically occupying a distinct, caste-like social position, maintained through clientship (sheegad) to patron clans rather than shared ancestry or genealogical descent. and Kusow & Eno (2015)

== Terminology and names ==
=== Self-designation ===
The Madhibaan's own name for themselves is "Madhibaan" (also rendered Madiban), which they interpret as meaning "harmless" or "the one who doesn't bother anyone." Some members of the Madhibaan, Tumaal, and Yibir groups have also referred to themselves as Baidari, one of several localized self-applied names documented across these communities. The related term "Gaboye" is itself old (ancient) — meaning "quiver," the case used for holding arrows, a reflection of the community's traditional association with hunting and archery — and is, considerably less denigrating. In the mid-1990s, prominent members of the Gaboye community promoted its wider adoption across Somali territories, and it has since become widely used, including in public and media contexts.

"Midgaan," by contrast, was never a term of self-identification. It was a degrading exonym applied to the community by other Somalis and by colonial administrators, consistent with its use in colonial-era ethnographic sources such as Kirk (1904). No documented instance exists of the Gaboye using "Midgaan" to refer to themselves.

=== Names applied by others ===
"Midgaan" (also spelled Midgan) is the term most commonly found in historical, colonial-era, and outsider ethnographic literature describing the Madhibaan (Gabooye). Its etymology is debated: Richard Burton interpreted it as meaning "one hand," while other scholars have proposed a derivation from gane ("archer"), reflecting the group's hunting occupation. As already noted, the term is widely regarded as pejorative and has never been used by the Madhibaan or Gaboye as a form of self-identification.

Somali society similarly classified the Madhibaan, along with the Yibir and Tumaal, under the broader term "Sab" — distinguished from the nomadic pastoralist "Aji" clans — a classification that, like "Midgaan," was never adopted by the Gaboye as a self-identification. Academic and sociological literature has also used the terms "occupational outcast group" or "occupational minority" to describe the Madhibaan's position within this caste-like system.

Colonial-era and early Western ethnographic writing — including the accounts of J.W.C. Kirk (1904) and Philipp Paulitschke (1888) — almost exclusively used "Midgan" and "Sab" to describe the Madhibaan and related Gaboye groups, rather than the community's own self-designations. Although "Midgan" predates formal British colonial administration, it was adopted as the standard reference term in British colonial-era ethnographic and administrative writing, and this usage has persisted into contemporary Western legal and administrative documentation — including U.S. and Canadian immigration proceedings and UNHCR/EU asylum guidance — which continue to use "Midgan" as a primary descriptive term even while noting the community's own preferred self-designation is "Gabooye." Early British colonial accounts, including those of Harald Swayne (1903) and J.W.C. Kirk (1905), additionally described the group as an "outcast" or "outcaste" people, and academic, legal, and humanitarian literature has since commonly classified the Madhibaan and other Gaboye groups simply as a "minority" or "minority group."

A 1944 British colonial genealogical survey of the protectorate's tribes illustrates this pattern concretely: under an entry for "Midgan," it lists the Madhibaan and Muuse Deriyo together as a single grouping — "hunters and leather workers, pre-Somali, with all tribes" — though the source provides no further elaboration.

In parts of southern Somalia, "Boon" is used as a regional term for the Madhibaan.

== 1991 Civil War violence ==
During the outbreak of the Somali Civil War in 1991, following the fall of Mohamed Siad Barre's government, Madhiban and other Gaboye communities were targeted by militia forces of the Hawiye clan, including those led by Mohamed Farrah Aideed, who accused them of loyalty to the ousted Barre regime. This resulted in widespread killings, rape, torture, and forced displacement of Madhiban and other Gaboye civilians; Darood clan family militias also attacked minority and outcaste clans during this period. As Gaboye groups exist outside the clan-based systems of arbitration available to major Somali clans, victims of this violence had no recourse for compensation or protection.

In Somaliland, Gaboye communities — including the Madhiban — were reported to have fled their home areas in fear of retaliation by Isaaq-dominated Somali National Movement (SNM) forces, due to perceived low-level support some Gaboye had given to the Barre government prior to its collapse. They were subsequently recognized as among the few groups of bona fide refugees from this period, alongside some Gadabursi sub-clans.

== Origin Narrative: Original Inhabitants and the "Mid-go" Account ==
The theory that the Madhibaan and related occupational groups descend from populations that inhabited the Horn of Africa prior to the Somali pastoralist expansion has a long history in the scholarly literature. Italian anthropologist Renato Biasutti proposed that the Somali occupational castes — the Yibir, Midgan, and Tumal — represent residues of pre-Cushitic populations subsequently conquered by later arrivals; Enrico Cerulli endorsed this view in his 1959 study of the origins of Somalia's lower castes, adding his own linguistic and geographic evidence in support. I.M. Lewis, whose work on Somali clan structure is otherwise associated with the clientship-based ("sheegad") explanation of Gaboye subordination, has separately noted the pre-Islamic, pre-pastoral population theory in his study of Somali popular Islam. A 2025 European Union Agency for Asylum report similarly notes that some Gaboye groups may be among the pre-Islamic, pre-ethnic-Somali populations subjugated by later proto-Somali pastoralist settlement.

A separate oral account, shared with researcher Hawa Y. Mire by Madhibaan elders, holds that the Madhibaan were among the original inhabitants of the Somali territories prior to the arrival of nomadic Somali pastoralist groups. According to this account, after prolonged conflict, the Madhibaan were defeated and placed in a concentration-style encampment. As captives died in this encampment, their captors are said to have called out "mid-go," meaning "one has died" or "one has fallen" — a phrase this account holds to be the origin of the term "Midgaan." Madhibaan clan members who share this narrative use it to assert their historical relationship to the Somali territories and their claims to land.

Mire notes that both the oral archive and colonial-era ethnographic sources contain material suggesting a connection between the Madhibaan and populations predating the arrival of nomadic Somali pastoralists, who are documented as having occupied the region beginning around the 12th and 13th centuries. Some sources link the Madhibaan to the Boon, described in earlier ethnographic literature as connected to pre-Negritic hunter-gatherer populations considered among the first inhabitants of the open terrain of North and East Africa. Mire cautions, however, that what "remains in perpetual question is Madhibaan connection or legitimacy to being Somali," even as both the oral and colonial archives point toward this indigenous connection.

Madhibaan oral tradition itself offers its own account of distinct origins, unconnected to any evolutionary or racial hierarchy: the "mid-go" narrative describes the Madhibaan as a once-distinct people with their own way of life, defeated in conflict by nomadic Somali groups and subsequently assimilating Somali language and much of Somali culture over generations, while remaining socially separate under customary law.

== Theological inconsistency and social context ==
Notably, the myth's premise is inconsistent with mainstream Islamic jurisprudence. The Quran explicitly permits eating normally-forbidden food, including carrion, under genuine necessity (darura) without sin: "But whoever is forced by necessity, neither desiring [it] nor transgressing [its limit], there is no sin upon him. Indeed, Allah is Forgiving and Merciful" (Quran 2:173; see also 5:3, 6:145, 16:115). This necessity exception is agreed upon across all four Sunni schools and Shia jurisprudence, applies specifically to genuine starvation with no halal alternative, and carries no requirement to purge or vomit the food once consumed out of necessity. Under this widely accepted doctrine, an ancestor eating carrion to survive starvation would not be considered sinful or impure, which further supports the scholarly view that the myth functions as a post-hoc social justification rather than a theologically grounded explanation.

== Clan status ==
Unlike the major nomadic Somali clan families, the Gaboye and other minority groups classified as sab — including the Madhibaan — are not considered by dominant nomadic Somali clans to be clans in the genealogical sense. According to Somali affairs analyst Joakim Gundel, dominant nomadic clans nonetheless label these minority groups as clans as part of an effort to assimilate them into the broader Somali clan structure.

== Etymology ==
The name "Madhibaan" is believed to come from the forefather of the Madhibaan people, Sheikh Madhibe, who was known for his peaceful nature and for not troubling anyone. In Somali, "Madhibaan" means "the one who doesn't bother."

The name Midgaan is the primary term used to refer to the Madhibaan people in historical literature. There are different theories about what "Midgaan" means. Richard Burton documented the name as meaning "One (Mid) Hand (gaan). However, it seems more likely that the second part of the term refers to the word gane, plural ganeyyaal, meaning "archer" (cf. also ganayya, "to shoot an arrow").

== Distribution ==
The Madhiban are a part of the Somali ethnic group found in East Africa, particularly in Somalia, Somaliland, and Djibouti.

== Marginalization ==
The Madhibaan people, along with other groups such as Yibir, Tumaal, and Muse, have long faced systemic marginalization within Somali society. Often excluded from the broader concept of "Somaliness," these groups have been subject to Heeb Sooc—a process of social exclusion or "othering" that places them outside the accepted social boundaries. This marginalization is rooted in long-standing cultural stigmas and unfounded myths, leading to their classification as lesser Somalis and second-class citizens.

This pervasive marginalization has affected nearly every aspect of life for the Madhibaan, from social interactions to opportunities for education and employment. Despite changes in Somali society over time, the legacy of these entrenched prejudices continues to impact the Madhibaan and other similar groups, leaving them to navigate a complex landscape of exclusion and limited opportunities.

The Madhibaan people, along with the Yibir and Tumaal, were historically part of the Saab group, while the rest of the Somalis were part of the Aji. This system functioned in a caste-like manner, separating the nomadic Aji from the largely non-nomadic Saab. According to Lee Gunderson, Dennis Murphy Odo, and Reginald D'Silva, the Madhibaan (referred to as Midgan in some texts) have traditionally been treated as a low caste, scorned and reviled within Somali society. A Madhibaan, considered polluting and therefore avoided as taboo, was marginalized and discriminated against in Somali society.

=== Historical ===
Historically, Somali culture has systematically marginalized the Madhibaan people through unwritten laws known as xeer. These laws played a crucial role in maintaining and enforcing the social hierarchy that discriminated against the Madhibaan and other groups such as the Yibir, Tumaal, and Muse. The xeer codified their exclusion from Somali society, denying them representation and basic rights. Madhibaan leaders who attempted to assert their rights or represent their people were often met with violence, and in some cases, were even killed.

The xeer also imposed severe restrictions on what the Madhibaan could own, limiting their access to land, property, and education. These laws dictated how they could live their lives, restricting their opportunities and reinforcing their status as second-class citizens. The pervasive nature of these unwritten laws ensured that the Madhibaan remained marginalized, unable to fully participate in the social, economic, or political life of Somali society.

=== Kacaan ===
Under Somalia's military administration, some Madhiban were appointed to positions within the government to promote integration. The Madhiban have since obtained wider political representation. Their general social status has also improved with the expansion of urban centers.

=== ICU ===
During the brief period in 2006 when the Islamic Courts Union (ICU) controlled southern Somalia, the ICU condemned discrimination against clans like the Madhibaan, Yibir as un-Islamic. A member involved with the ICU, who was a member of these clans, stated, "The best system that can end discrimination (takoor) against us is Islam. Nobody can come to me and say I have a monopoly over the Islamic identity, but one can say you are not clan X because your lineage does not conform to that clan's lineage system."

=== Modern ===
The marginalization of the Madhibaan people continues today, manifesting in several ways including exclusion from government resources, lack of access to education, and widespread discrimination. Madhibaan neighborhoods often receive minimal attention from the government and are excluded from essential resources such as water and education.

A prime example is the Daami neighborhood in Hargeisa, which is predominantly inhabited by the Gabooye including Madhibaan. This area is one of the poorest in Hargeisa and receives scant attention from the government, highlighting how the Madhibaan are systematically excluded from vital resources and support.

The political representation of the Madhibaan is severely limited. In the Somali government, the Madhibaan are classified as part of the 0.5 group, which restricts their political influence to only two seats in parliament. This underrepresentation reflects the broader exclusion of Madhibaan people from key decision-making processes and political power.

== History ==
=== Medieval ===
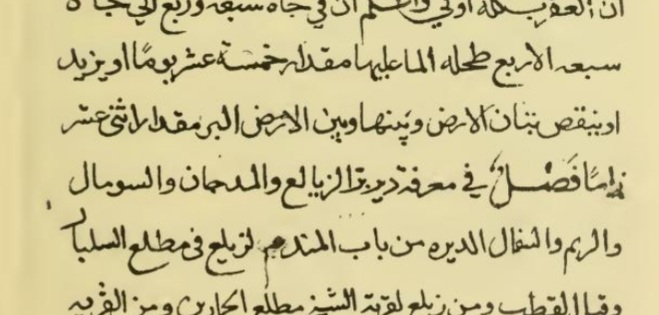
Al madhibaan, Al Somali

The first recorded reference to the Madhibaan people dates back to 1435 in Suleiman's translation of Ibn Majid's writings and poems found in Ababn Majid. In this text, Suleiman identifies the Madhibaan as Al-madhibaan, emphasizing their distinction as a separate nation from the Somali people. He briefly mentions the name Al Somali as well.

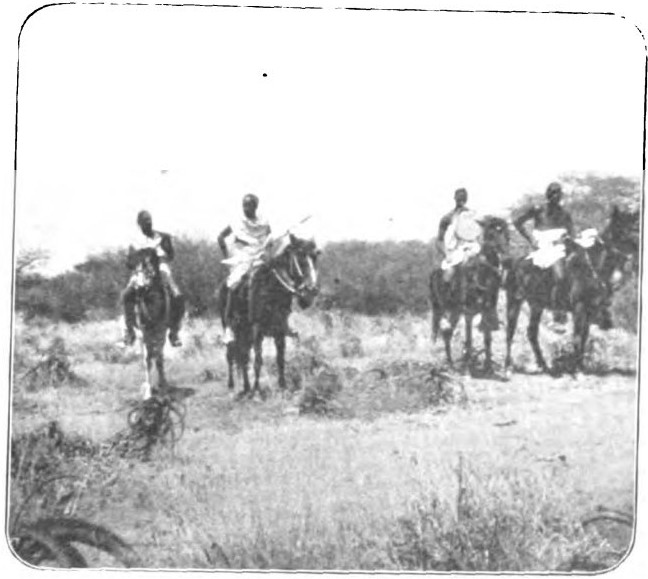
Madhibaan Horsemen

==== Makhzumi dynasty ====
In the year 629 AH (1231 AD), a significant battle occurred between the Madhibaan and the Makhzumi dynasty on a Friday in the month of 'Ashura'. Sultan 'Abdallah was captured in Gidaya after nearly two years. He died in the year 632 AH (1234 AD) on the twentieth night of Ramadan.

=== Medical history ===
The Madhibaan have been integral to Somali society's healthcare practices for centuries. Their medical knowledge, passed down through generations, combines rational, and religious approaches. This blend of practices is common in Somali culture, where both traditional healers and lay practitioners from the Madhibaan tribe, known as wadads, provide medical care.

==== Traditional medical roles ====
The wadad or "doctor" may be a traditional healer with acquired medical knowledge or a layman from the Madhibaan tribe. Surgery, gynaecology, obstetrics, and treatment of infant diseases are primarily in the hands of Madhibaan practitioners. Their womenfolk, in particular, play a crucial role in these fields.

==== Transmission of knowledge ====
The medical lore of the Madhibaan is traditionally passed from father to son or mother to daughter. This knowledge is not confined to a closed circle; it can also be taught to strangers for a fee. For instance, in 1947, a woman named Nuria gained fame for her herbal treatments after receiving instructions in a vision, attracting patients from as far as Aden and Djibouti.

==== Surgical practices ====
Madhibaan surgeons have developed significant expertise in various surgical fields. Their instruments, made of iron with wooden handles, include knives, forceps, gimlets, and scissors. Despite the lack of modern anesthesia, their surgical techniques are advanced. They practice haemostasis with pressure dressings, use myrrh on incisions, and employ thorns as needles with vegetable fibers for stitching.

Wounds are treated by removing foreign bodies, using acacia roots for haemostasis, and dressing with bark. For snake bites, a ligature is applied proximally, the wound is incised and packed with salt. Burns are treated with sugar and oil, while trepanning is performed for skull fractures.

Reported by Gurlt in 1898:

Among the Somal, the Midgan are practical surgeons who treat quickly healing broken bones very well

==== Maternal and infant care ====
Madhibaan women excel in gynaecology, obstetrics, and infant care. They use various herbal treatments and manual techniques for menstrual disturbances, venereal diseases, and other reproductive health issues. For instance, excessive menstrual periods are treated with the gum habab agagi and hot compresses.

==== Poison knowledge ====
The Madhibaan are well-versed in the use of poisonous plants. They use arrow poisons made from plants like Acocanthera schimperi and Adenium somalense for hunting. This knowledge extends to recognizing and treating poisonings in humans and animals.

=== Resistance against colonialism ===
==== Early anti-colonial efforts ====
Madhibaan played a significant role in resisting colonial incursions across various Somali regions during the late 19th and early 20th centuries. Notably, from March 17 to 19, 1891, in the Fafan region, 1,000 Madhibaan men engaged in armed resistance against Italian forces. Using poisoned arrows, the Madhibaan attempted to repel the Italians, though the colonial forces ultimately dispersed the attack with gunfire. This confrontation highlights the early opposition of Somali communities, including the Madhibaan, to foreign domination.

==== Resistance in central and southern Somalia ====
In April 1891, Madhibaan and Tumaal communities in central Somalia resisted colonial movements in the Hobyo region. Reports detail hostile engagements in areas such as Mahai and Vuarsceik, where local groups, described as ironworkers and craftsmen, pursued and harassed Italian forces. Armed with javelins, spears, and arrows, they orchestrated nightly ambushes and engaged in guerrilla tactics, forcing the Italians to hastily retreat.

==== Contributions to the Dervish Movement ====
Madhibaan were integral to the Dervish Movement, led by Mohammed Abdullah Hassan, which sought to unify Somali clans against colonial powers. Within the Dervish structure, Madhibaan occupied key roles:

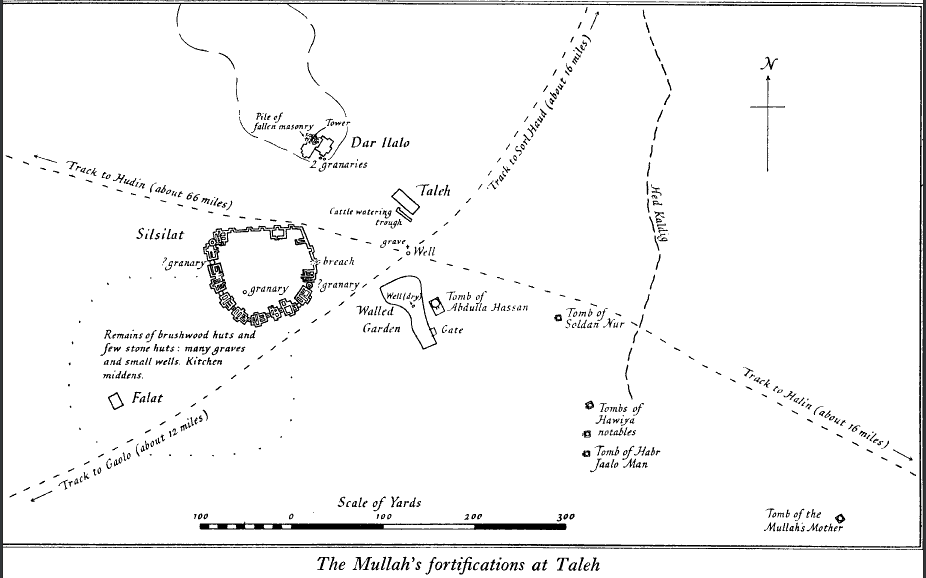
Plan of Taleh Fort

- Gaarhaye: A specialized security unit responsible for safeguarding Dervish territories, predominantly composed of Madhibaan members.
- Bodyguards: Sayyid Mohamed retained a personal guard of Madhibaan archers equipped with poisoned arrows to ensure his safety, reflecting the trust placed in them.
- Military Formation: Madhibaan archers were positioned in the second line of battle formations, supporting the spearmen and cavalry.
- Craftsmen and Medical Practitioners: As weapon smiths and artisans, the Madhibaan, along with the Tumaal, crafted saddles, tassels, and other essential equipment for the Dervish cavalry. They also served as doctors, highlighting their multifaceted contributions to the movement.

=== Madhibaan in Harar ===
Madhibaan have a documented history in the region surrounding Harar, contributing significantly to the city's artisanal, medical, and agricultural traditions.

==== Historical presence ====
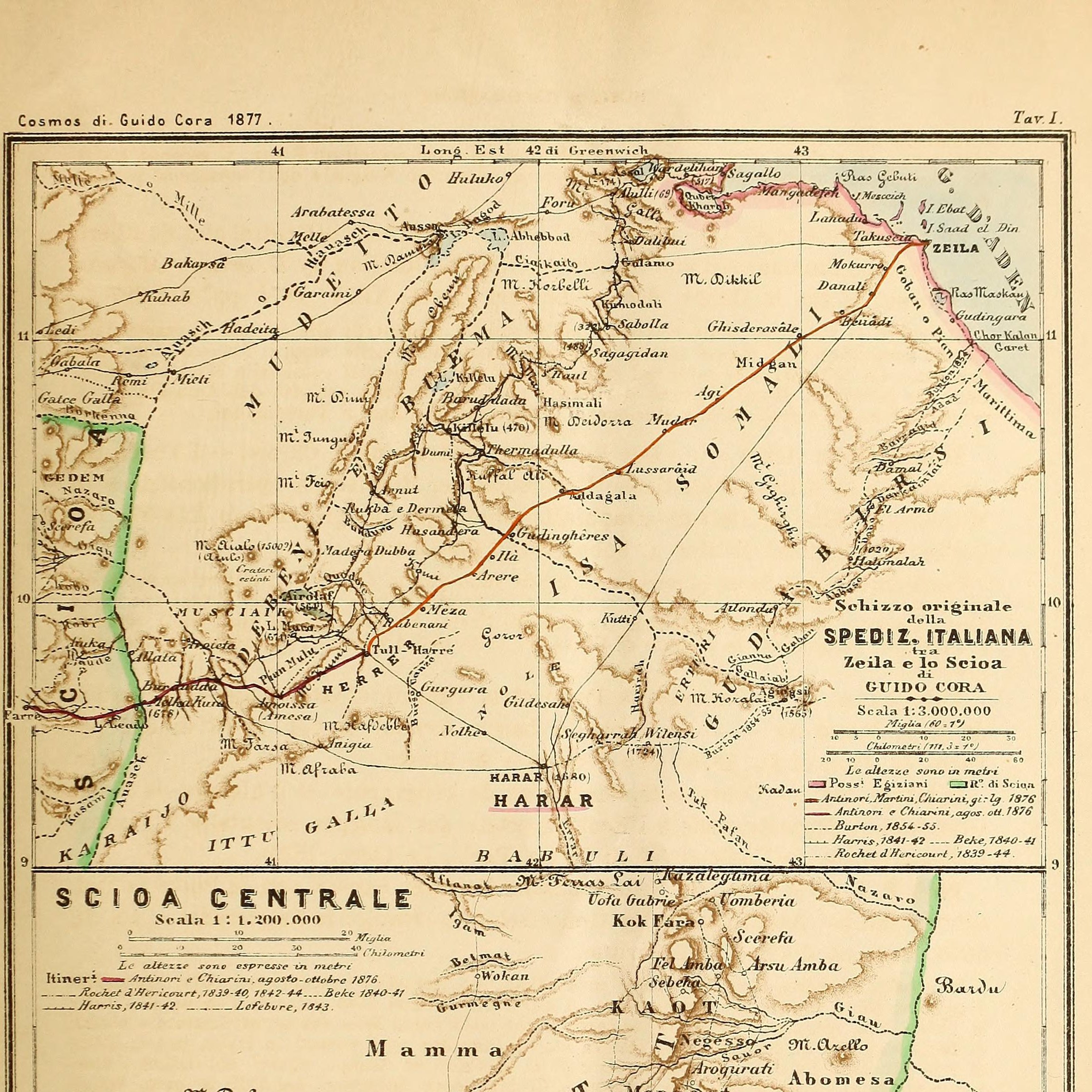
An old map showing the trade routes from Zeila to Harar featuring the Madhibaan clan

Italian scholar Enrico Cerulli documented the remnants of the Harla community living between Harar and Jijiga. This group spoke a Somali dialect resembling that of the Madhibaan, indicating a potential historical link between the two communities. According to the Encyclopaedia Aethiopica, the Harla may have integrated into Somali society while retaining a distinct identity through their unique language, "af Harlaad." Cerulli noted that this language closely resembled the dialects spoken by the Yibir and Madhibaan.

Prior to the conquest of Harar, the Madhibaan and Tumaal people dominated neighborhoods near the city's Badri Bari and Suqutat Bari gates. These districts were known for their artisanal activity, including blacksmithing, which was a hallmark of Madhibaan craftsmanship.

==== Contributions to medicine ====
The Madhibaan of Harar were highly regarded for their medical expertise, particularly in bone-setting. Accounts from travelers and scholars highlight their skill in using plates of copper, lead, and iron for splinting broken bones. A notable story involves a European who sought treatment for a dislocated bone. After unsuccessful attempts by Greek and Italian doctors, a Madhibaan bone-setter in Harar managed to heal him with practiced precision. This anecdote underscores the reputation of Harar's Madhibaan community for their medical knowledge.

==== Artisanship and farming ====
The Madhibaan in Harar were deeply involved in artisanal crafts, including blacksmithing, leatherworking, and other trades. These skills made them integral to the city's economy. Additionally, those living outside the city were engaged in farming, cultivating crops like limes, plantains, and pomegranates. Women from the community often sold ghee, cotton, and other goods along the roadsides, contributing to the region's vibrant marketplace.

==== Demographics ====
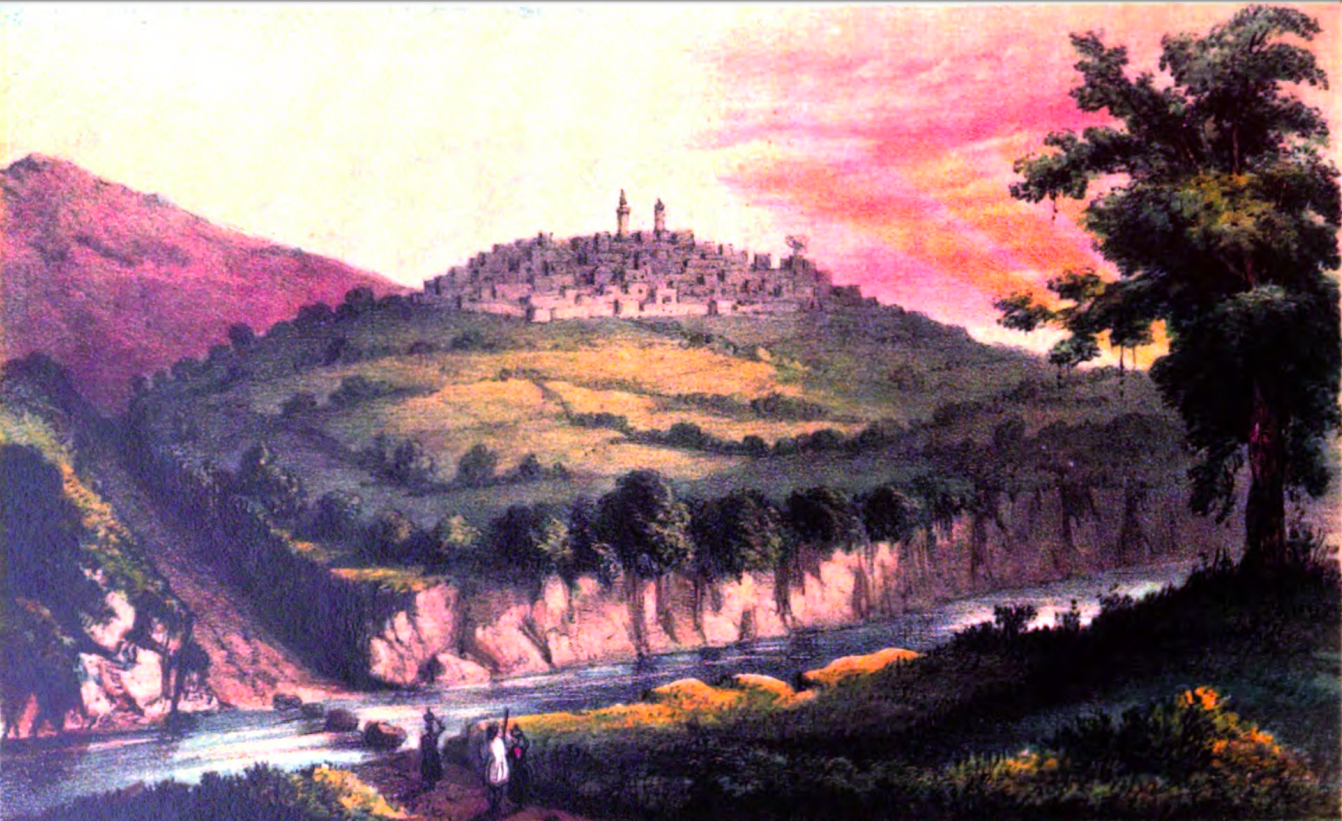
Harar

Madhibaan In Zeila, Harar, Somali Region, and Afar region (1888) reported by Paulitschke

At Zeila, Bia-Kabôba, Dialdésse, and Harar, I had the opportunity to observe Jibêr, Tomâl, and madhibaan individuals in particular, and although I must confess that much larger and more extensive material is required to study this question than is available to me in this respect, I must nevertheless confess that the representatives of the Pariah races seemed to me to be completely different from the Somâl proper, not only socially but also physically.

The Madhibaan individuals I saw at Dialdêssa, a place where the Somâl live quite peacefully alongside the Galla, seemed to me to resemble the latter in shape and appearance, but to have finer and more delicate countenances. Also from the lighter skin color, which I had the opportunity to observe on several Madhibaan, I believe I can deduce their Galla origin. Among the Somäl tribes of the Ogaden, the Madhibaan are said to be present in large numbers and represent small individuals in comparison to the Somâl. Among the Danakil on the Hawas we also find the Madhibaan as experienced hunters.

== Culture ==
=== Af-Caloowe ===
The Madhibaan people, like the Yibir, have a distinct dialect that sets them apart from the mainstream Somali language. Early 20th-century Western linguists classified this dialect as a unique form of Somali. Notably, the Madhibaan and Yibir dialects share a significant number of words, reflecting a close linguistic relationship between these two groups.

Enrico Cerulli documented the language of the Harla community, known as af Harlaad, which bore a resemblance to the dialects spoken by the Madhibaan and Yibir. This linguistic similarity underscores the deep historical connections and cultural exchanges among these marginalized communities.

J.W.C. Kirk, a British infantry officer stationed in British Somaliland, provided a detailed account of the Madhibaan dialect in his 1905 grammar of Somali. Kirk noted that the Madhibaan and Yibir dialects differ significantly from the dominant Somali language, a distinction that serves to maintain secrecy and protect the autonomy of these groups. According to Kirk, the secrecy of their dialects was crucial in preventing the ruling class from exerting total dominance over the subservient clans.

Kirk repeatedly emphasized the importance of this secrecy, urging readers not to disclose the details of the Madhibaan dialect to any Somali not of Yibir or Madhibaan descent. This sentiment was echoed by the German linguist Adolf Walter Schleicher in his 1892 grammar of the Somali language, highlighting the ongoing need to preserve the confidentiality of these unique linguistic forms.

In more recent times, linguist Roger Blench, referencing Kirk, noted that the dialects of the Madhibaan and Yibir differ substantially in lexicon from standard Somali. However, it remains unclear whether this divergence is due to a distinct linguistic code or if it represents entirely separate languages.

== Notable Madhiban ==
=== Politicians ===
- Ahmed Ashkir Botan – politician
- Bashir Mohamed Jama – politician and military officer

=== Musicians ===
- Maryam Mursal – singer
- Mohamed Sulayman Tubeec – singer, songwriter
- Shey Mire Dacar – musician

== Groups ==
- United Somali Roots: Founded 1991, represents Somali indigenous groups, non-violence organization
- Gaarhaye, was the ninth-largest of the eleven constitutive Darawiish administrative division; it was exclusively Madhiban.
