= Ahmed Ashkir Botan =

Somali Professor, Minister of Higher Education and Culture(1978-1982)

Mohamed Ashkir Botan
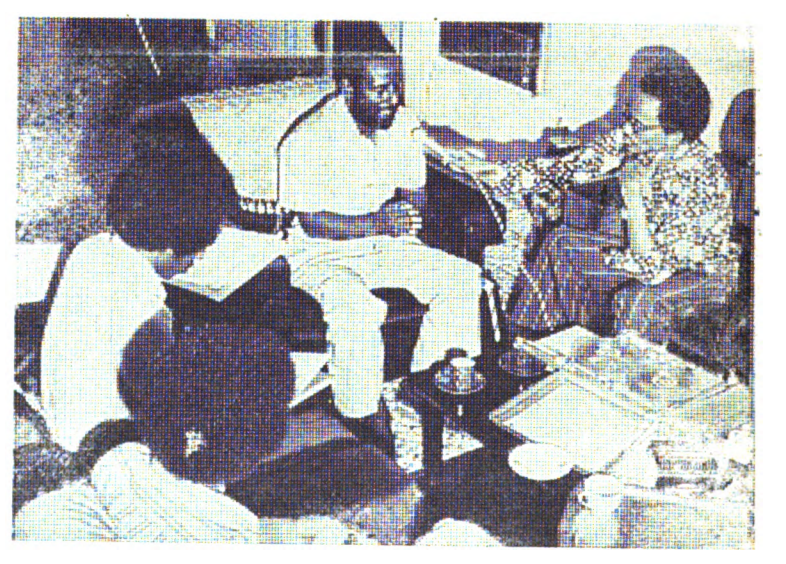
- Dr. Mohamed giving an interview in 1979.

President of Somali National University
- In office 1970–1977

Minister of Culture and Higher Education of Somali Revolutionary Socialist Party
- In office 1978–1982
- Preceded by: Umar Arteh Ghalib
- Succeeded by: Abdiqasim Salad

Chairman of the Bureau for Central Committee Affairs of Somali Revolutionary Socialist Party
- In office 1983–1990

Personal details
- Born: 1934 (age 91–92) Dhusamreb, Somalia
- Education: Somali National University

Mohamed Ashkir Botan (Somali Mohamed Ashkir Bootaan; Arabic: أحمد أشكر بوتان) was a prominent Somali politician, academic, and statesman. He served as the President of the Somali National University from 1967 to 1977 and later held the position of Minister of Culture and Higher Education of the Somali Revolutionary Socialist Party from 1978 to 1982. Botan also chaired the Technical Committee that drafted the Somali Constitution in 1979. From 1985 to 1990, he was the Chairman of the Bureau for Central Committee Affairs and the Head of the Secretariat of the Central Committee within the Somali Revolutionary Socialist Party.

== Career ==
Ahmed Ashkir Botan began his career as a professor at the Somali National University, where he contributed significantly to the country's higher education system. In 1970, he became the President of Somali National University, a position he held until 1978. During his presidency, Botan was instrumental in expanding the university's academic reach and solidifying its role as a leading educational institution in Somalia.

In 1978, Botan was appointed Minister of Culture and Higher Education, succeeding Omar Arteh Ghalib. He held this position until 1982, during which he focused on educational reforms and the preservation of Somali cultural heritage, ensuring that the educational system aligned with the country's social values and national objectives.

In 1979, Ahmed Ashkir Botan served as the Chairman of the Technical Committee responsible for drafting the Somali Constitution. In this role, he led efforts to create a legal framework that reflected the cultural values and aspirations of the Somali people. The draft constitution aimed to promote unity, social justice, and economic development while establishing a socialist framework. Botan's leadership facilitated constructive dialogue within the committee, allowing for the incorporation of national identity and governance principles. Although the constitution was not fully implemented, it became a foundational document influencing subsequent legal and political developments in Somalia.

Alongside his work in academia and government, Botan held several positions within the Somali Revolutionary Socialist Party (SRSP). He was a member of the SRSP Central Committee and served as Chairman of the Bureau for Central Committee Affairs from 1983 to 1990. He also held the position of Head of the Secretariat of the Central Committee (CC)from 1984 to 1990, overseeing the party's administrative functions and internal operations.

Botan's contributions to both education and politics have been recognized as essential to Somalia's development, particularly during the transformative years of the post-colonial era.

=== The delegation of 1978 ===
In 1978, a significant delegation led by Minister of Higher Education and Culture Ahmed Ashkir Botan visited China. On the evening of the 21st, they were hosted by Minister of Education Liu Xiyao. Minister Liu praised the friendship and unity between the Chinese and Somali peoples in the struggle against hegemony, imperialism, and proliferation, and expressed his hope to exchange and learn from the rich experiences of those involved in education and culture in Somalia:

The delegation led by Minister of Higher Education and Culture Ahmed Ashkir Botan was hosted by Minister of Education Liu Xiyao on the evening of the 21st. Minister Liu praised the friendship and unity between the Chinese and Somali peoples in the struggle against hegemony, imperialism and proliferation, and expressed his hope to exchange and learn from the rich experiences of those involved in education and culture in Somalia.

=== The delegation of 1985 ===
In 1985, a delegation from the Somali Revolutionary Socialist Party, consisting of five members and led by Ahmed Ashkir Botan, the Central Committee Secretary-General and Assistant Secretary-General, arrived in Beijing on April 29 at the invitation of the Chinese delegation. On the evening of May 1, Qian Liren, Director of the International Department of the Chinese Communist Party, met with the delegation and hosted a banquet.
