= Tomal =

Artisanal caste among Somali people

Tomal / Tumal
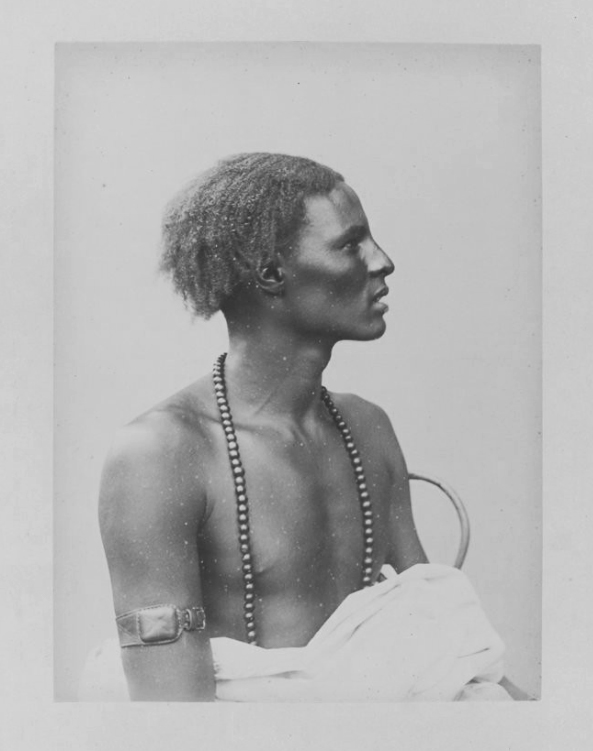
- Handullah Abdi a 20 year old Tumal man

Regions with significant populations
- Somalia, Ethiopia, Djibouti, Kenya

Languages
- Somali

Religion
- Islam

Related ethnic groups
- Dir, Hawiye, Darod, Isaaq, Rahanweyn and other Somali people

The Tomal, also known as Tumal or Tumaal, is an artisanal caste among Somali people. Their traditional hereditary occupation has been as smiths and leather production, and they have been endogamous.

The Tomal have been one of the low status castes or outcasts among the Somalis, along with Madhiban and others. They have historically faced discrimination, restrictions, harassment and prejudice from other social strata of the Somali people.

== Discussion ==
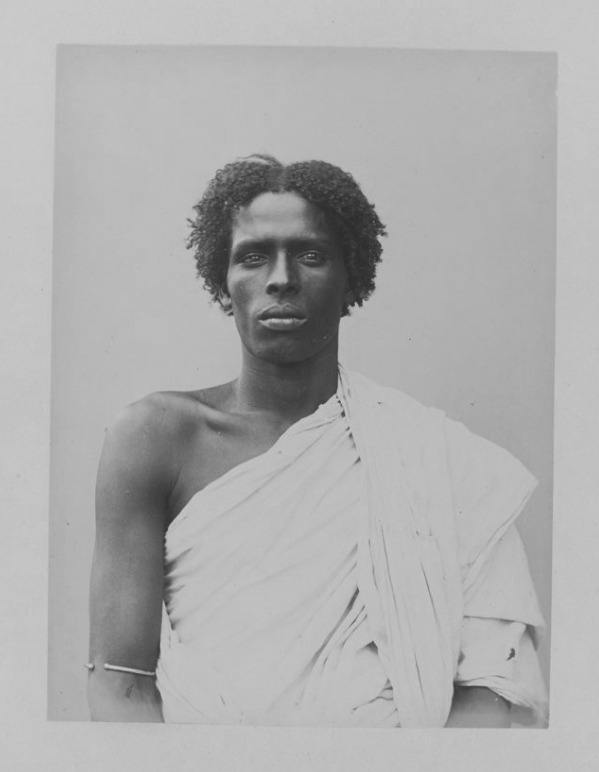
20 year old Tumal man Egal Mohamud photographed in 1890 by Rolande Bonaparte

According to the folklore tradition of the Somali people, Tomal and other low castes arose from unholy origins. They were historically smiths who worked various metals, and some also were leather workers (producing and processing animal skin). They may be, states Peter Bridges, pre-Somali Bushmen-like natives who lived in these lands. They are one of a castes within the Sab lineage among the Somali, but they are not the Bantu-related slave strata of the Somali people.

According to Richard Francis Burton, the colonial era Somali ethnographer describing his observations in the northern Somali country, the Tomal were also known as Handad probably a corruption of Haddad which in Arabic means "ironworkers". They were considered vile because they had intermarried with the servile group within the Somali society, and their work with metal and fire was presumed to make them following the path of David and close to witchcraft. These people, states Burton, were also found and reviled in Al-Yaman.

Later scholarship, such as by Heather Marie Akou – a professor of History specializing in Near East Cultures, states that per mythical narrative Tomals had intermarried with Midgans, and have been the talented descendants of nomads in the Horn of Africa. The Tomal caste has been notable for their everyday dress, where they traditionally carry a hand crafted long spear called waran as walking stick, and a hidden dagger called bilawi in a leather belt.

According to Teshale Tibebu – a professor of History specializing on Ethiopia and Horn of Africa, the Tomal along with Mijan and Yibir castes have traditionally been considered as ritually impure using Islamic rationalization, and other caste members of the Somali society would never marry a member of the Tomal, Mijan and Yibir castes. Incidental reports of prejudicial comments against the Tomal by other Somali people, in contemporary society include they being called "nasab-dhiman", or "ignoble outcast".

== Cognate castes in the Horn of Africa ==
The Tomal caste is not an exception limited to the Somali ethnic group, and equivalent cognate caste is found in numerous ethnic groups in Horn of Africa and the rest of East Africa.

According to Donald Levine – a professor of Sociology specializing in Ethiopian and Horn of Africa studies, similar caste groups in different languages and ethnic groups have been integral part of societies of this region. These strata have featured all the defining characteristics of caste, states Levine, characteristics such as "endogamy, hierarchy, status, concepts of pollution, restraints on commensality, a traditional occupation and membership by birth".

In East African ethnic groups, such as the Oromo people, caste structure with cognates to Tomal have been recorded in 16th century texts, states Cornelius Jaenen. The table below illustrate some alternate terms for castes mirroring the Tomal in other ethnic groups that share this region with the Somali people.

Castes equivalent to Tomal in Horn of Africa
Ethnic group	Caste name	Occupation
Somali	Tomal, Tumal	smiths
Agew of Lasra	Tebib	smiths
Amhara people	Teyb, Gafat	smiths, potters
Tigre people	Tebib	smiths
Argobba people	Qetqech	smiths
Borana people	Tumtu	smiths, potters, weavers
Gurage people	Nefwra	smiths
Sidama people	Tunicho	smiths
Burji people	Tumtu	smiths
Kefa people	Qemmo	smiths
Konso people	Hauda	smiths, potters, weavers, tanners

== Notable Tumal ==
- Mohamed Ali Samatar was a Somali politician and lieutenant general.
- Maxamed Cali Waji He is a famous journalist, writer and media person in Somaliland.
- Shiekh Mohamed Guuleed Kaarshe, Islamic scholar and former minister of religion in Somalia in 1980s
