= Yibir =

Caste group of Somali people

Regions with significant populations
- Somalia

Languages
- Somali, Arabic

Religion
- Sunni Islam

Related ethnic groups
- Somali people

The Yibir, also referred to as the Yibbir, the Yebir, or the Yibro, are a caste of Somali people. They have traditionally been endogamous. Their hereditary occupations have been magic making, leather work, the dispensing of traditional medicine and the making of amulets. They belong to the Sab clan and sometimes referred to as a minority clan, they perform menial tasks.

The Somali tradition holds that the Yibir are descendants of Mohammad Hanif of Hargeysa. Mohammad Hanif acquired a reputation as a pagan magician, according to Somali folklore, he was defeated by Yusuf bin Ahmad al-Kawneyn. According to this myth, the rest of the Somali society has ever since paid a small gift to a Yibir after childbirth, as a form of blood compensation.

The Yibir have a language (a dialect of Somali) they keep secret from the ruling Somali clans. Although Muslims and ethnically similar to other Somalis, the Yibir caste has been traditionally denigrated, demeaned and discriminated against by higher social strata of the Somali society.

== History ==
=== Foundation ===
The foundational for the Yibir involves one Shaykh Yusuf bin Ahmad al-Kawneyn, also known as Aw Barkhadle (Blessed Father), associated as one of those who brought Islam to Somalia from Arabia. The story goes that when Barkhadle first arrived in the northern Somali region, he was confronted by pagan Mohamed Hanif (also pejoratively known as Bu'ur Ba'ayer). The two leaders then decided to settle the issue of legitimacy between them via a test of mystical strength. Barkhadle challenged Hanif to traverse a small hill near Dogor, an area situated some 20 miles north of the regional capital of Hargeisa. Hanif twice successfully accomplished this task asked of him. However, during Hanif's third demonstration of his powers, Barkhadle "invoked the superior might of God and imprisoned his rival for ever within the mountain." Orthodox Islam thus prevailed over the old pagan cult. An alternate version states that Barkhadle murdered the pagan Hanif.

Hanif's descendants, goes the legend, subsequently demanded blood money or diyya from Barkhadle for the death of their leader and in perpetuity. Barkhadle granted them their wish. This myth underlies the Somali practice of offering gifts to Yibir who come to give amulets and bless newborn children and newlywed couples. Ever since, Somali have adhered to the custom of samanyo or samayo ("birth gift"), payment made to the Yibir by their Somali patrons.

One of the versions of the story is recorded in Yibir and translated into English by John William Carnegie Kirk. In 1921, Major H. Rayne, a district-commissioner in British Somaliland, also recounts the story, using it as a preface to an anecdote about a Somali who had just become a father and asked him for money to pay a passing Yibir.

=== Origins and identity claims ===
Some Somalis and outside observers have described the Yibir as being of possible Jewish or Hebrew origin, citing the etymological resemblance between the word Yibir and the Hebrew ʿIbrîm (Hebrews). Some individual Yibir have referenced Hebrew ancestry in oral accounts.

However, the primary academic study dedicated to the Yibir explicitly concludes that Jewish descent is "improbable" (improbables descendants de Juifs) and that comparisons between the Yibir and Hebrews "appear highly suspect" (paraissent hautement suspects). The Yibir leader Ahmed Jama Hersi, speaking in 2000, described his people's own oral history as arriving as Arabic-speaking teachers over 1,000 years ago, and did not claim Jewish ancestry. The Immigration and Refugee Board of Canada noted multiple competing origin theories including possible Tzigane descent, and concluded that further information was unavailable.

Despite these disputed origin claims, the overwhelming majority of the Yibir, like the Somali population in general, adhere to Islam. Their perceived difference from mainstream Somali society has been offered as an explanation for the Yibir occupying a subordinate position in Somali society.

== Social status ==
According to Teshale Tibebu – a professor of History specializing on Ethiopia and Horn of Africa, the Yibir along with Mijan and Tomal castes have traditionally been considered as ritually impure, and other caste members of the Somali society would never marry a member of the Tomal, Mijan and Yibir castes. They were, for many years, denied basic rights and opportunities for education.

== Occupation ==
The Yibir traditionally were itinerant magicians. Their occupation in the Somalia have been similar to those of Dushan in southern Arabia, both being jesters in the employ of the chiefs. The Yibir also crafted hardas (amulets) containing verses from the Quran, prayer mats and leather goods such as saddles. These amulets have been in demand as protection from harm and illness during childbirth and other rites of passage.

The Yibir are skilled workers who engage themselves in the various jobs that city dwellers do, unlike the Somali nomads, their livelihood depends on their skills which requires them to make crafts and other object the Somali communities need. Traditionally, Yibirs are known for their religious rituals. When a child is born in Somalia, a person from the Yibir caste is invited to bless the child by giving a Quranic verse-containing amulet for protection, and in return the Yibir receives a payment for conducting the ceremony, then an amulet is placed on the child's neck to protect the child from evil eyes and any malicious acts. These amulets are traditionally worn by children everyday, in the superstitious belief of their protective powers, even when these children are allowed to run naked.

== Contemporary situation ==
Yibir have a reputation for magic; one of their traditional functions is to bless the newborn and the newly married. In return for these blessings they receive gifts, a continual repayment for the killing of Mohammed Hanif. They subsist in two different ways—by being attached to noble Somali families, or by (cyclically) visiting different households. The payments they receive, called samanyo (described by an English scholar as a "tax"), also function to forestall the fear of a possible cursing of the (Somali) host by the Yibir soothsayer or magician; though the Yibir are the "smallest and most despised" clan of the sab, they are thought to have the strongest magic. Persistently refusing to give a gift on the occasion of a birth invites the curse of the Yibir, which is supposed to result in a violent death for the refusing party or a deformed new-born. Another of the Yibir's believed supernatural characteristics is that when they die they vanish: no one, according to Somali tradition, "has ever seen the grave of a Yibir", a quality possibly derived from the disappearance of their ancestor, Hanif. Hanfili the spouse of Hanif is stated to have her mausoleum in the city of Harar which receives frequent visitors, talismans are made from the tree near the grave.

There has been no census count and estimates about the Yibir community vary. In 2000, Ahmad Jama Hersi who is a Kenyan resident, guessed that 25,000 Yibir lived in Somalia and neighboring countries.

== Language ==
The language of the Yibir (like that of the Madhiban) is described by early 20th century Western linguists as a dialect of the Somali language. Yibir and Madhiban are similar and share a number of words. Enrico Cerulli published some data on this Harla community's language, called af Harlaad, which resembled the Somali languages spoken by the Yibir and Madhiban low-caste groups.

J.W.C. Kirk, a British infantry officer stationed in British Somaliland, published a grammar of Somali with an account of the Yibir and Midgan (i.e. Madhiban) dialects in 1905 and commented on the difference of the two dialects from the dominant Somali language. According to his sources, the difference is necessary to maintain a secrecy and keep the ruling class from total dominance of the subservient clans:

Each tribe has its own dialect, which has hitherto been kept as a solemn secret from the rest of the world. They still insist upon secrecy from Somalis, and made me promise not to divulge to their hereditary enemies what they were quite willing to explain to the white man.

I, therefore, rely upon any who may read this not to disclose to any Somali what I have been allowed to write down for the benefit of the Sirkal, but if any other officer of an enquiring disposition wishes to pursue the subject, he should be acquainted with the Somali language, which all the Sab know, and discuss these things with one of them.

Kirk stresses this desire for secrecy repeatedly: "Therefore I must ask any who may read this and who may sojourn in the country, not to repeat what I give here to any Somali, not of Yibir or Midgan birth"; a similar note was sounded by the German linguist Adolf Walter Schleicher in his 1892 grammar of the Somali language.

In more recent times, the linguist Roger Blench, referencing Kirk, has similarly indicated that the Yibir and Madhiban dialects both "differ substantially in lexicon from standard Somali". However, he remarks that it remains unknown whether this linguistic divergence is due to some sort of difference in code or is instead indicative of distinct languages.

== Cognate castes in Horn of Africa ==
The Yibir caste is not an exception limited to the Somali ethnic group, and equivalent cognate caste is found in numerous ethnic groups in Horn of Africa and East Africa. According to Donald Levine – a professor of Sociology specializing in Ethiopian and Horn of Africa studies, similar caste groups in different languages and ethnic groups have been integral part of societies of this region. These strata have featured all the defining characteristics of caste, states Levine, characteristics such as "endogamy, hierarchy, status, concepts of pollution, restraints on commensality, a traditional occupation and membership by birth".

In east African ethnic groups, such as the Oromo people, cognates to Somali castes have been recorded in 16th century texts, states Cornelius Jaenen. Among Cushitic-speaking Bako people and others in the Horn of Africa, a similar despise and isolation has been targeted against a caste of negroid-origin people for magic and ritual services such as blessing babies, circumcision, and burying the dead.

The "Watta" people who are hunter gatherers among the Oromo people are also despised and occupy lowest strata in society.
