= Porsuk =

Porsuk (literally "badger" is a Turkish word that may refer to:

== Places ==
- Porsuk, Çarşamba, a village in the district of Çarşamba, Samsun Province, Turkey
- Porsuk, Pasinler, a village in the district of Pasinler, Erzurum Province, Turkey
- Porsuk, Sivas, a village in the central (Sivas) district of Sivas Province, Turkey
- Porsuk, Ulukışla, a village in Ulukışla district Niğde Province, Turkey

== Other uses ==
- Porsuk Dam, on the Porsuk river in Eskişehir Province, Turkey
- Porsuk River, a stream in Eskişehir Province, Turkey
- Porsuk Sports Hall, a multi-purpose venue in Eskişehir, Turkey
