= Hasan Polatkan Airport =

Hasan Polatkan Airport Hasan Polatkan Havalimanı
- IATA: AOE; ICAO: LTBY

Summary
- Airport type: Public
- Operator: Eskişehir Technical University
- Serves: Eskişehir, Turkey
- Location: Tepebaşı, Eskişehir, Turkey
- Opened: 1989; 37 years ago
- Elevation AMSL: 2,588 ft (789 m)
- Coordinates: 39°48′36″N 30°31′10″E
- Website: https://hph.eskisehir.edu.tr/tr/

Map
- Location of airport in Turkey

Runways
| Direction | Length | | Surface |
| Direction | ft | m | Surface |
|---|---|---|---|
| 27/09 | 9,843 | 3,000 | Concrete |

Statistics (2025)
- Annual passenger capacity: 500,000
- Passengers: 110,564
- Passenger change 2024–25: ▼1%
- Aircraft movements: 3,858
- Movements change 2024–25: ▼31%

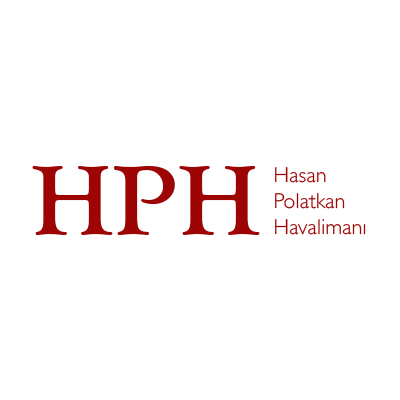
Hasan Polatkan Airport Logo

Hasan Polatkan Airport (IATA: AOE, ICAO: LTBY) (Turkish: Hasan Polatkan Havalimanı) is an international airport that serves the city of Eskişehir. Located within the Faculty of Aeronautics and Astronautics, Eskişehir Technical University.

== History ==
Hasan Polatkan Airport was opened to air traffic with its original name of “Anadolu Airport” for the first time in March 1989. Opening of Eskişehir Hasan Polatkan Airport to traffic is based on the establishment of Civil Aviation Vocational Highschool (SHMYO), which is the foundation of Eskişehir Technical University, Faculty of Aeronautics and Astronautics, in 1986. While the basic mission of the airport opened to traffic with the name “Eskişehir Anadolu Airport” in 1989 was to conduct the educational activities of Flight Training and Air Traffic Control Departments of SHMYO, over years, air transport service has also become possible for the people of the region.

The airport primarily aimed to meet training activities of the Faculty of Aeronautics and Astronautics and national and international air travel demand that may occur in Eskişehir and the surrounding provinces.

The stakeholders of Eskişehir Hasan Polatkan Airport have always been aware of the potential of this airport in air transportation, although its main mission is seen as aviation training. In this context, upon the intense demands of people living in Eskişehir and its close regions, our compatriots in Belgium, non-governmental organizations and the business world, the Airport was brought to the appropriate standards for international flights in 2005 by initiating necessary studies by the University. Consequently the Airport was declared as a temporary air border crossing with Ministry Approval dated September 9, 2005. Also, the same year, the first international flights started on the Eskişehir-Brussels line. The Airport serves not only Eskişehir but also the region within the scope of aviation activities like scheduled and unscheduled passenger transport, patient transport, fire fighting, flights of government officials and air taxi besides training flights since 1989 when it opened to traffic.

== Airlines and destinations ==
The following airlines operate regular scheduled and charter flights at Eskişehir Airport:

| Airlines | Destinations |
|---|---|
| Corendon Airlines | Seasonal: Brussels |
| SunExpress | Brussels |
| TUI fly Belgium | Brussels; Seasonal: Ostend/Bruges |

== Statistics ==
Eskişehir–Hasan Polatkan Airport passenger traffic statistics
| Year (months) | Domestic | % change | International | % change | Total | % change |
|---|---|---|---|---|---|---|
| 2025 | - | - | 110,564 | ▼1% | 110,564 | ▼1% |
| 2024 | - | ▼100% | 113,535 | ▲20% | 113,535 | ▲20% |
| 2023 | 57 | ▼88% | 93,105 | ▼14% | 93,162 | ▼15% |
| 2022 | 456 | ▲351% | 108,554 | ▲9% | 109,010 | ▲9% |
| 2021 | 101 | ▲29% | 99,514 | ▲95% | 99,615 | ▲95% |
| 2020 | 78 | ▼88% | 51,080 | ▼42% | 51,158 | ▼43% |
| 2019 | 657 | ▼17% | 88,365 | ▼10% | 89,022 | ▼10% |
| 2018 | 787 | ▼56% | 98,544 | ▲26% | 99,331 | ▲14% |
| 2017 | 1,808 | ▲71% | 78,240 | ▲41% | 80,048 | ▲42% |
| 2016 | 1,057 | ▼56% | 55,397 | ▲12% | 56,454 | ▲9% |
| 2015 | 2,389 | ▼3% | 49,536 | ▼14% | 51,925 | ▲13% |
| 2014 | 2,459 | ▲26% | 43,413 | ▲34% | 45,872 | ▲33% |
| 2013 | 1,955 | ▼34% | 32,445 | ▼27% | 34,400 | ▼27% |
| 2012 | 2,940 | ▼76% | 44,288 | ▲45% | 47,228 | ▲10% |
| 2011 | 12,508 | ▼55% | 30,530 | ▼15% | 43,038 | ▼32% |
| 2010 | 27,650 | ▼31% | 35,960 | ▼6% | 63,610 | ▼19% |
| 2009 | 39,994 | ▲14% | 38,329 | ▲267% | 78,323 | ▲72% |
| 2008 | 35,037 | ▲165% | 10,440 | ▲361% | 45,477 | ▲193% |
| 2007 | 13,212 | Steady | 2,292 | Steady | 15,504 | Steady |

== See also ==
- Eskişehir Airport

== Name Change ==
In 2017, the airport name was changed officially to Hasan Polatkan Airport (its prior name was Anadolu University Airport)
