= Eskişehir =

- Metropolitan municipality
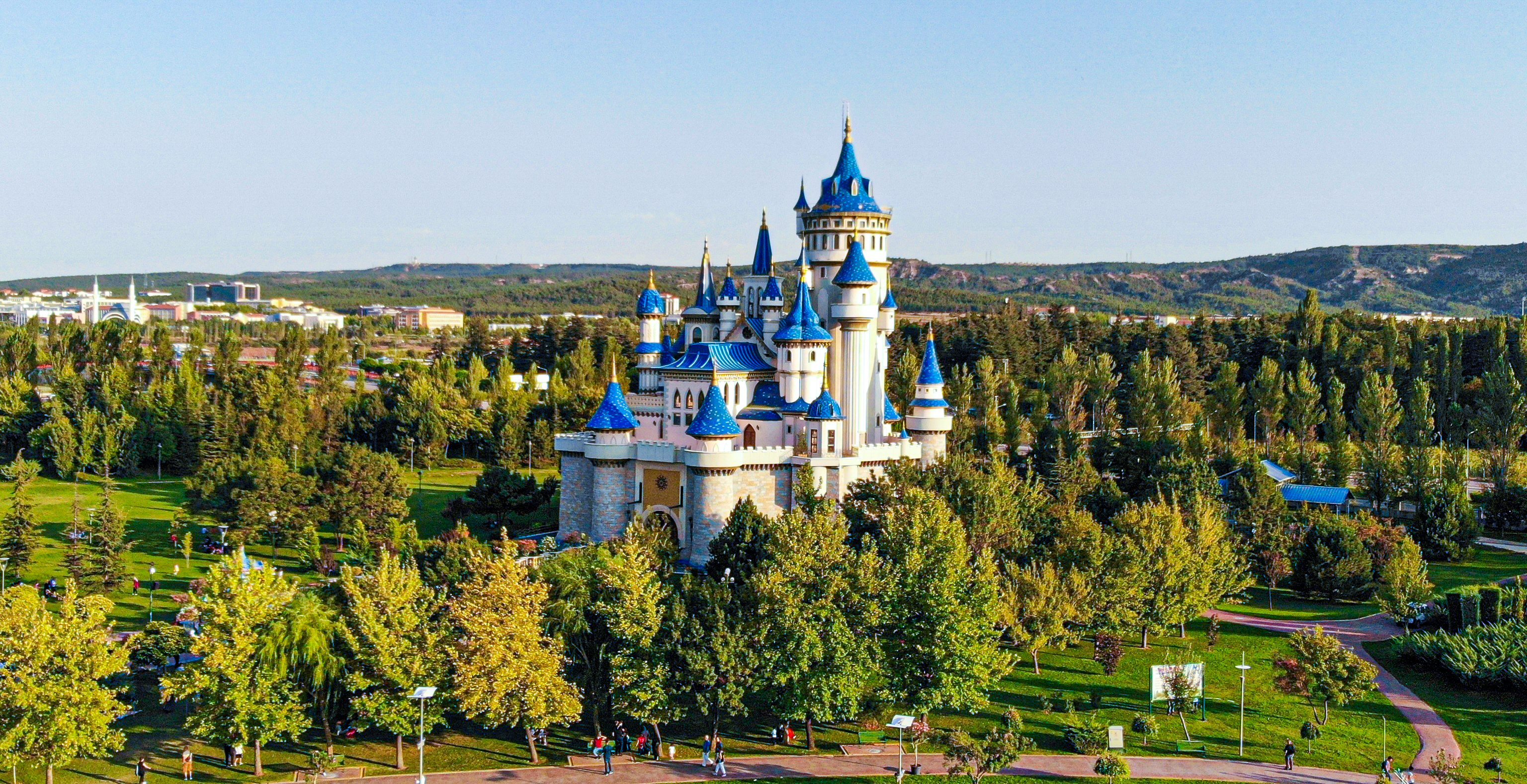
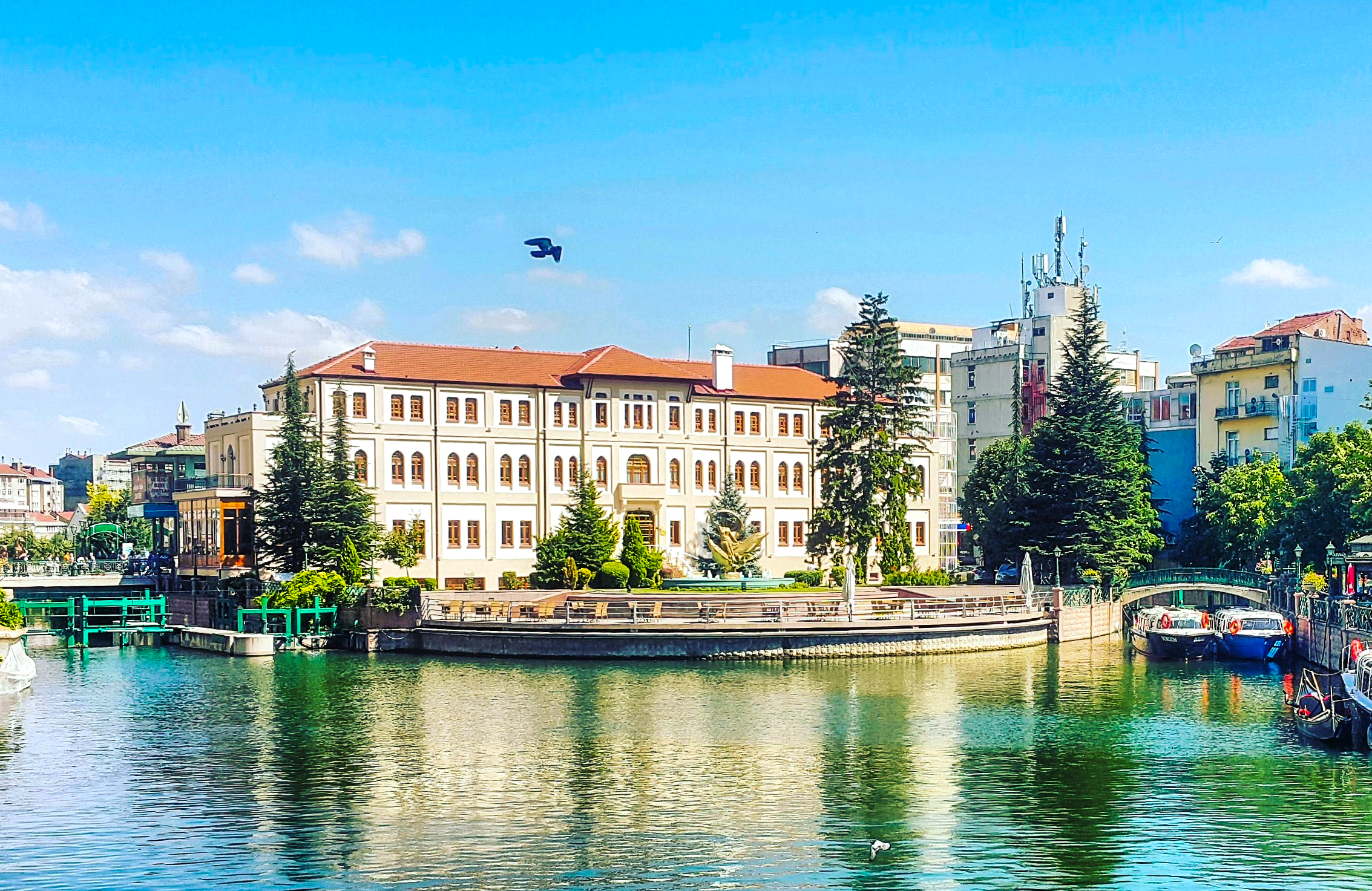
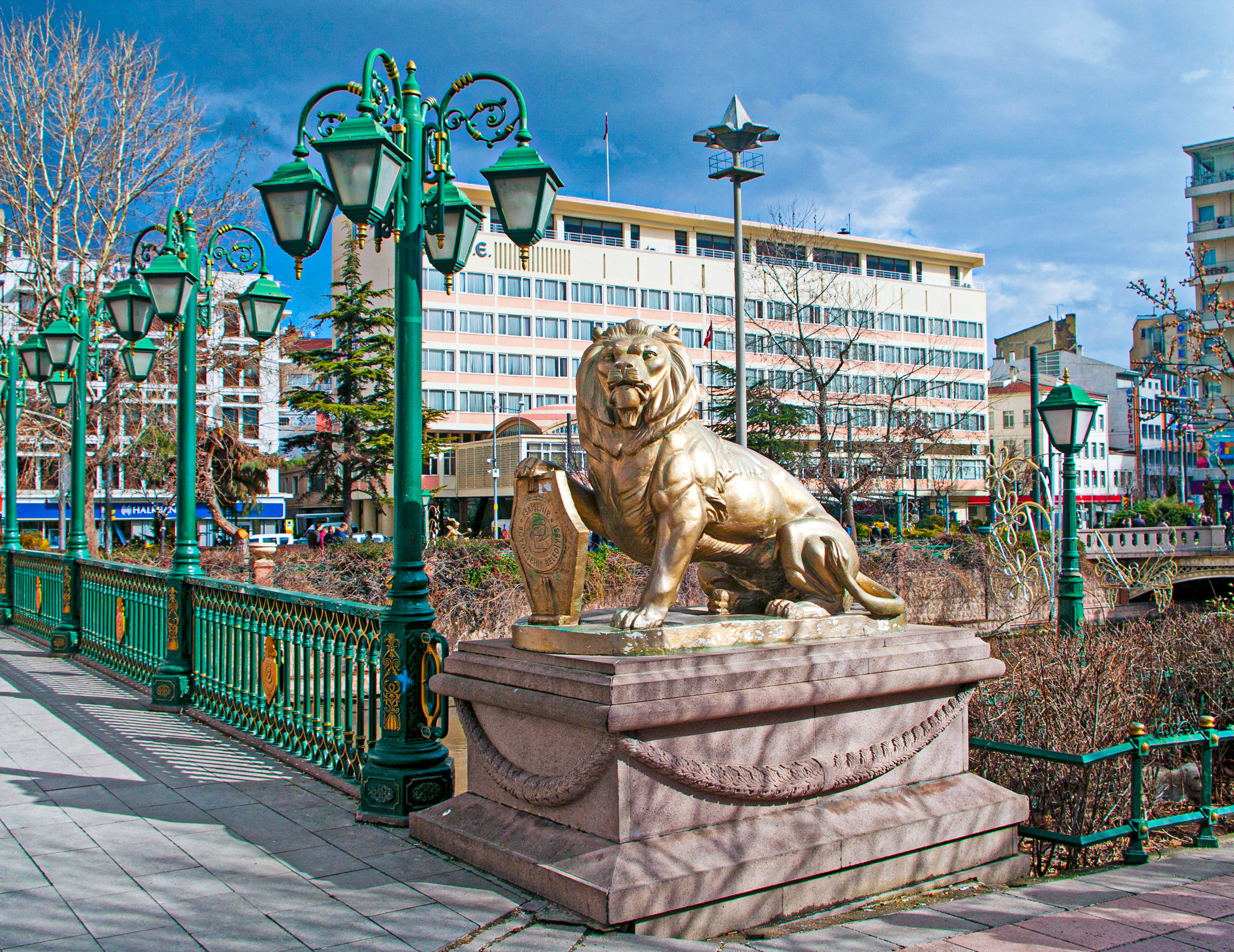
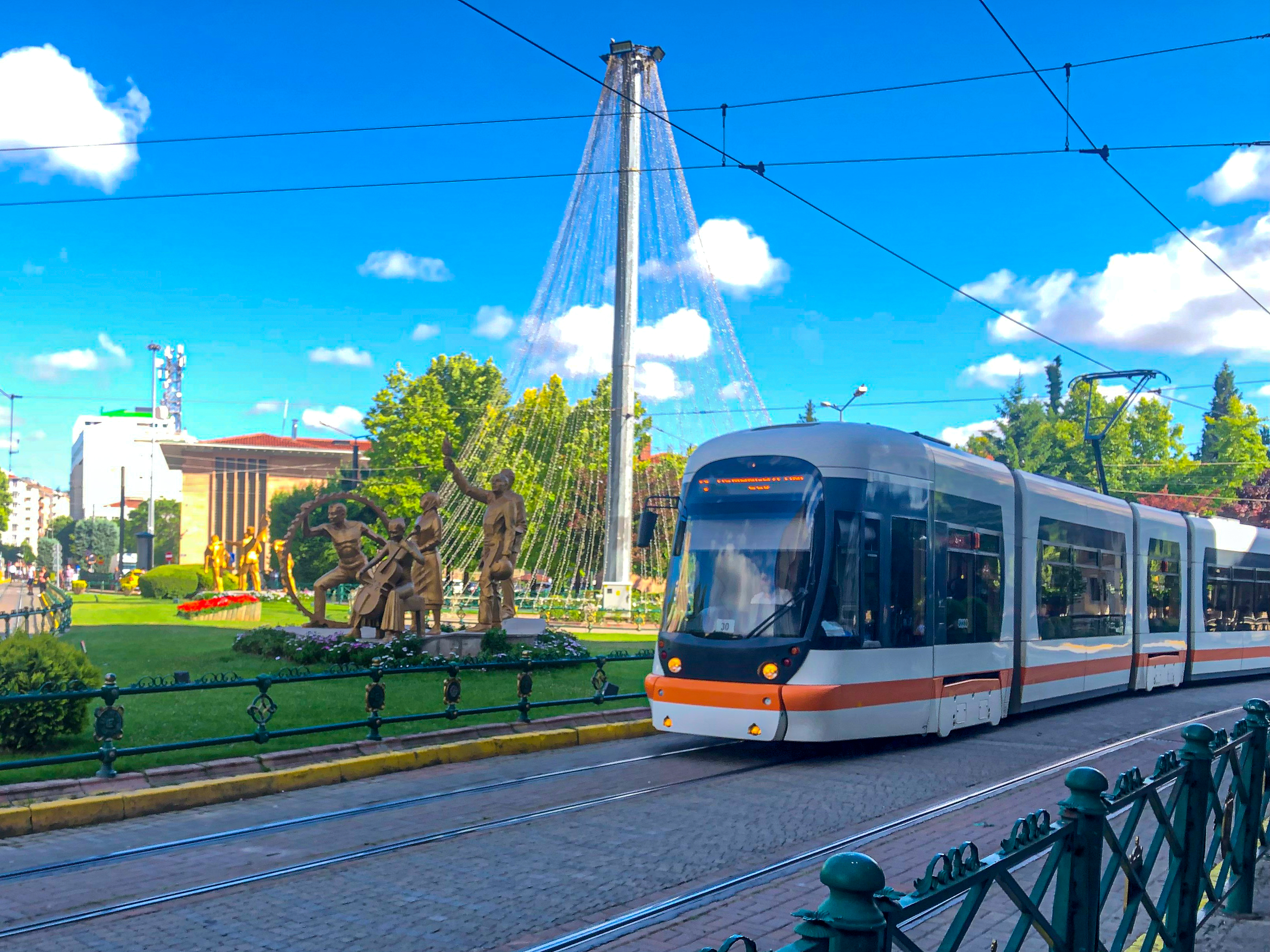
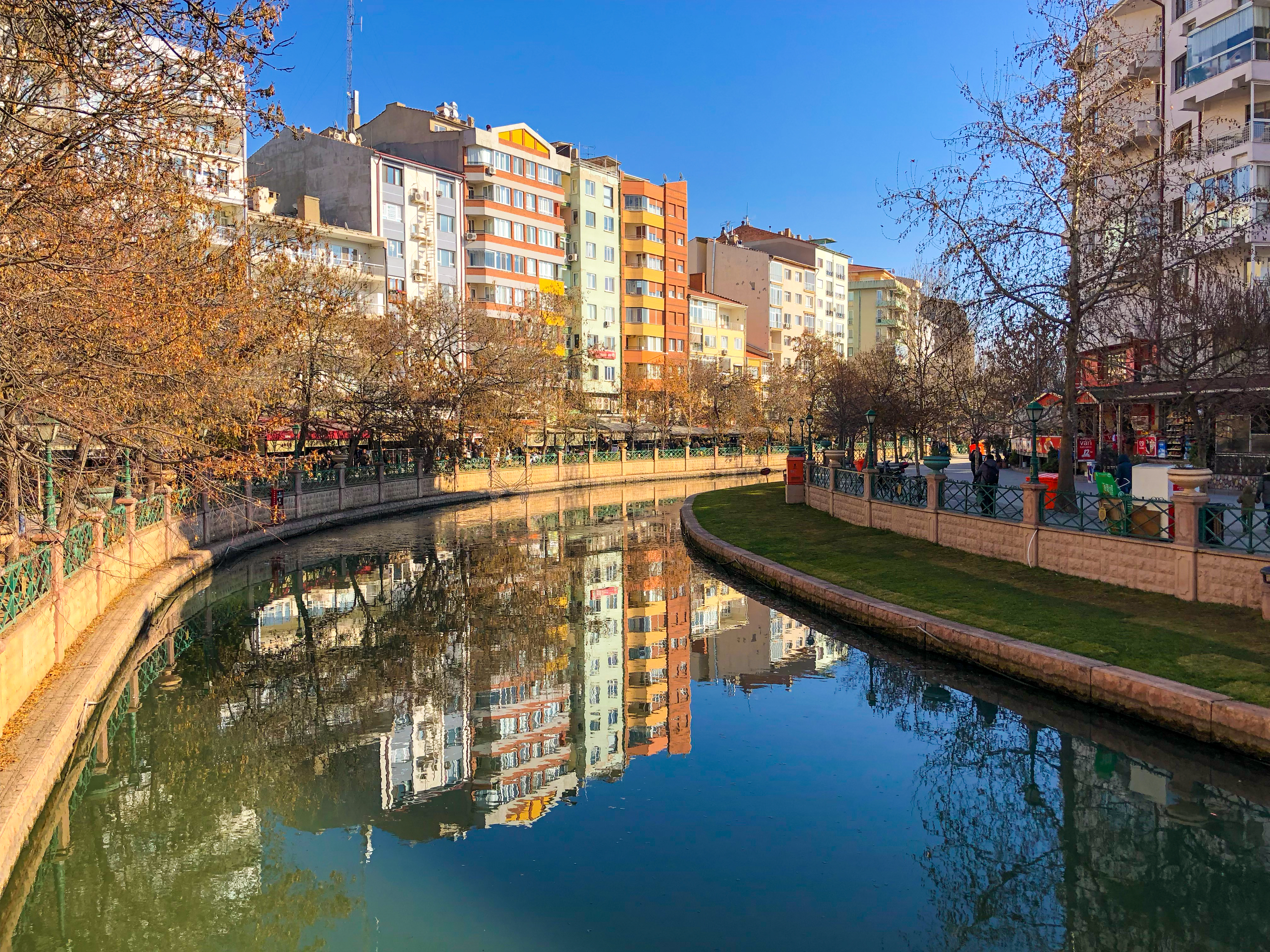
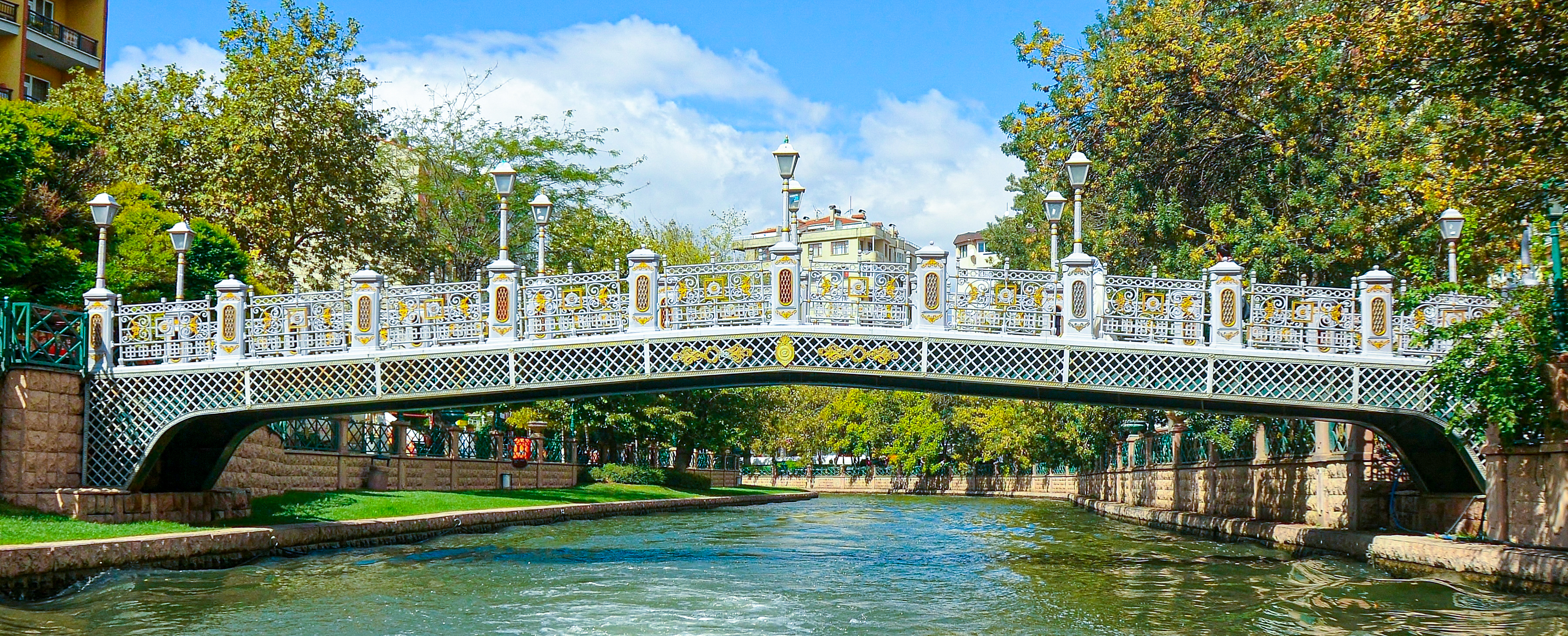
- Clockwise from top: Eskişehir Fairy Tale Castle in Sazova Park, Lion Statue in Eskişehir, Porsuk River, Porsuk Bridge, Eskişehir Tram, Eskişehir Municipality

- Emblem of Eskişehir Metropolitan Municipality

- Location within Turkey Location within Asia Location within the world
- Coordinates: 39°46′17″N 30°31′06″E
- Country: Turkey
- Region: Central Anatolia
- Province: Eskişehir

Government
  - Metropolitan Mayor: Ayşe Ünlüce (YENİ)

Area
  - Metropolitan municipality: 2,678.00 km^{2} (1,033.98 sq mi)
- Elevation: 788 m (2,585 ft)

Population (2024)
  - Metropolitan municipality: 921 630
  - Density: 335/km^{2} (870/sq mi)
  - Urban: 821 315

GDP
  - Metropolitan municipality: TRY 749.52 billion US$ 14.994 billion (2025)
  - Per capita: TRY 530.834; US$ 16,175 (2025)
- Time zone: UTC+3 (TRT)
- Postal code: 26 xxx
- Area code: (+90) 222
- Registration plate: 26
- Website: www.eskisehir-bld.gov.tr

Eskişehir (US: /ˌɛskɪʃəˈhɪər/ ES-kish-ə-HEER, Turkish: [esˈciʃehiɾ]; from eski 'old' and şehir 'city') is a city in northwestern Turkey and the capital of the Eskişehir Province. The urban population of the city is 821,315 (Odunpazarı + Tepebaşı), with a metropolitan population of 921,630.

The city is located on the banks of the Porsuk River, 792 m above sea level, where it overlooks the fertile Phrygian Valley. In the nearby hills one can find hot springs. The city is 233 km (145 mi) to the west of Ankara, 330 km (205 mi) to the southeast of Istanbul and 78 km (48 mi) to the northeast of Kütahya. It is located in the vicinity of the ancient city of Dorylaeum.

Known as a university town, it houses Eskişehir Technical University, Eskişehir Osmangazi University, and Anadolu University. The province covers an area of 2,678 km^{2} (1,034 sq mi).

== Etymology ==
The name Eskişehir can be literally translated as 'Old City' in Turkish. The name has been documented in Ottoman records since the late 15th century.

== History ==
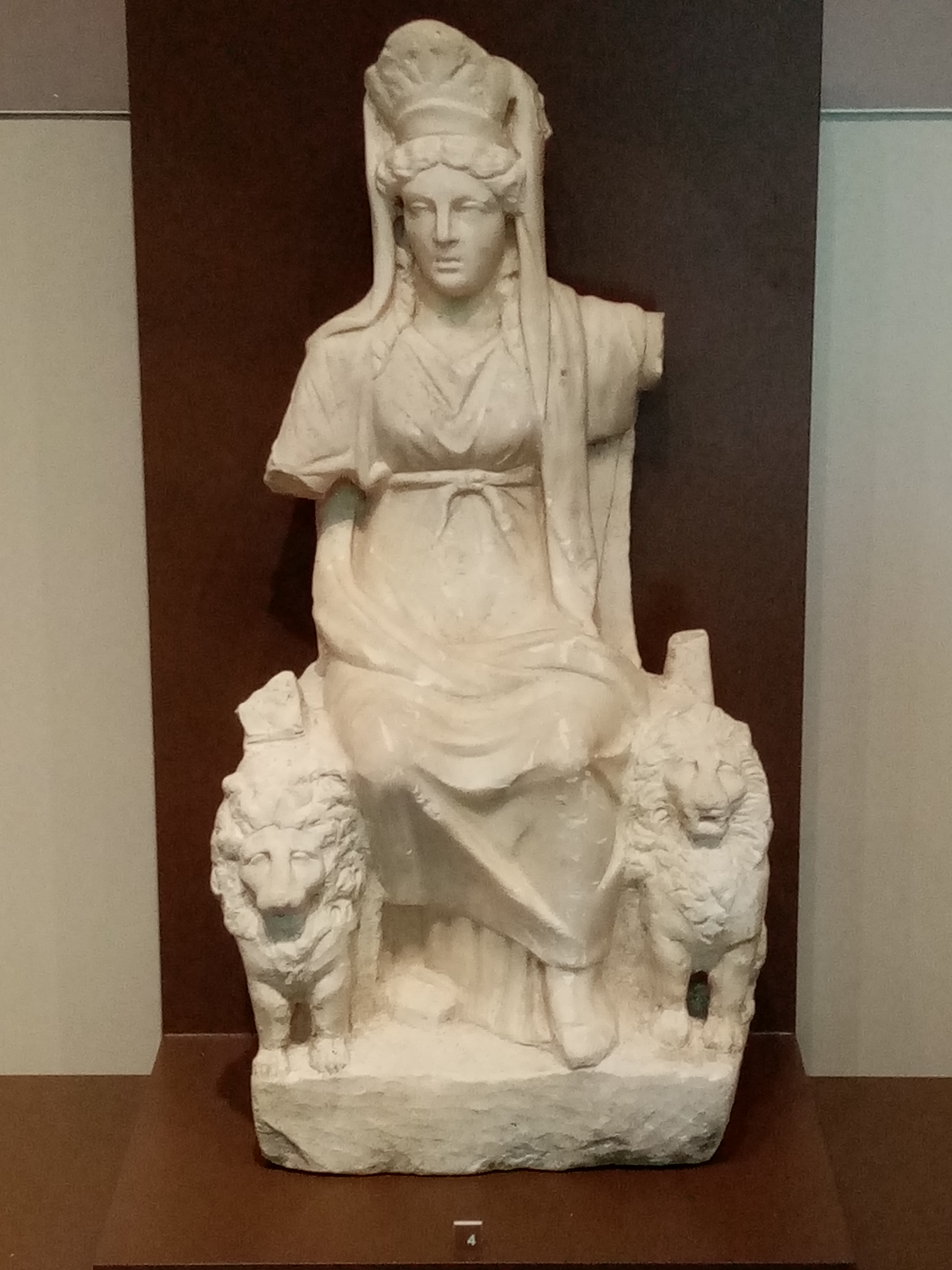
Cybele Statue (30 BC - 395 AD) excavated from the Ancient City of Pessinus exhibited in the Eskişehir Archeology Museum.

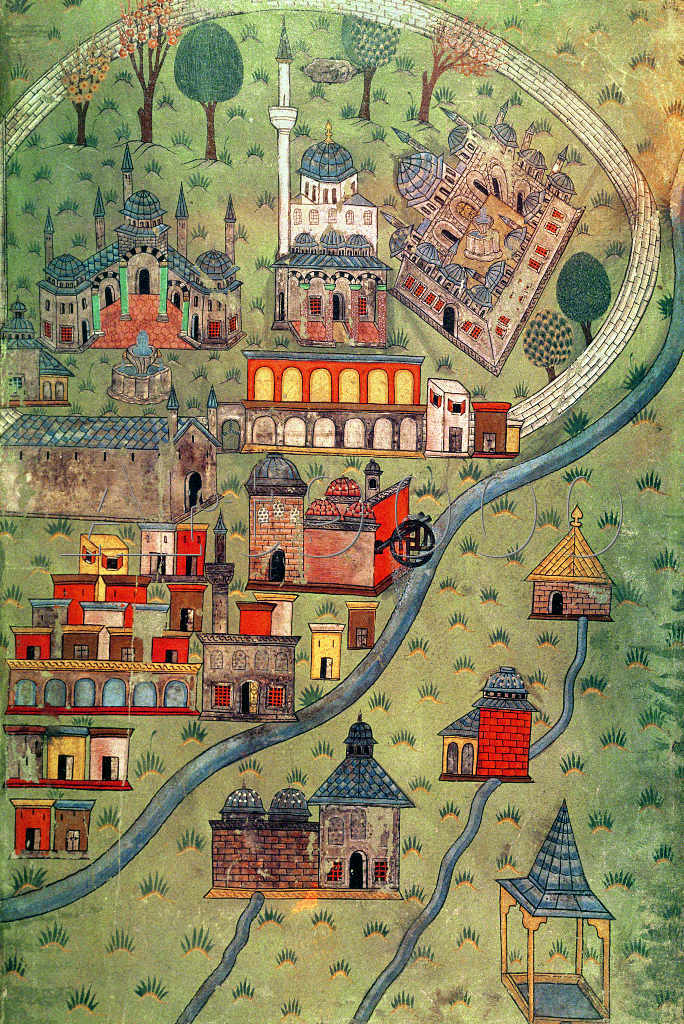
Miniature view of Eskişehir in the 16th century during the Ottoman Empire.

The city was founded by the Phrygians around 1000 BC, although it has been estimated that the site could be older. The current city lies about a mile from the ancient Phrygian city of Dorylaeum. Many Phrygian artifacts and sculptures are on display in the city's archeological museum. There is also a museum of meerschaum stone, whose production remains notable in the city for the production of quality meerschaum pipes. In the 4th century the city moved about 10 km northeast, from Karacahisar to Şehirhöyük.

After Constantine the Great legalized Christianity in the Roman Empire, multiple bishops started to hold office in Dorylaeum, like Eusebius, who opossed the teachings of Nestorius and Eutyches. In the 11th century, Dorylaeum produced rich harvests of grain and the rivers close to the city were a great source for fish. The villages around the city were densely populated and Dorylaeum itself was embellished with stoas, fountains, and houses of illustrious citizens.

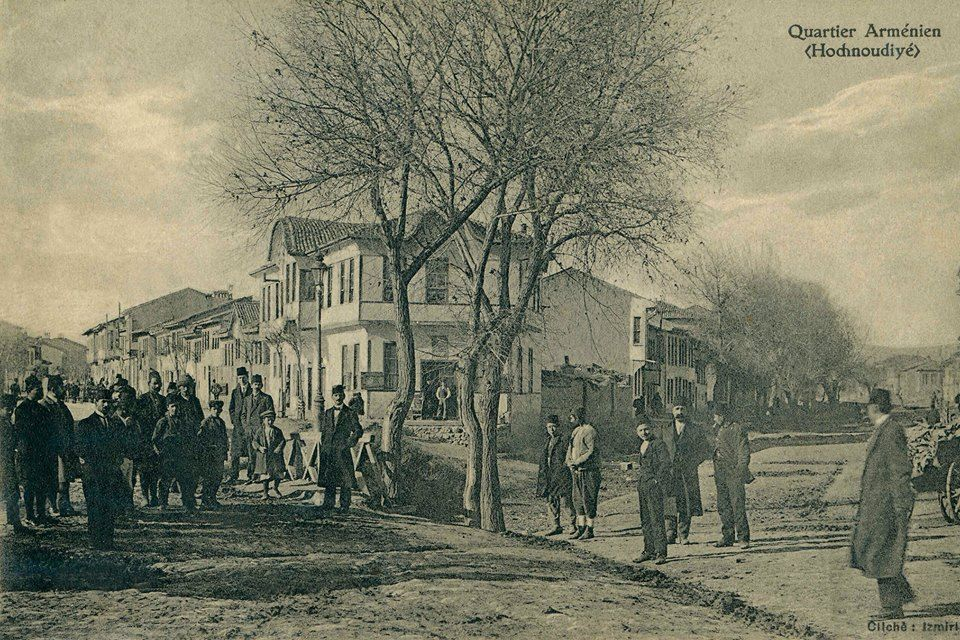
Hoşnut, also known as Hoşnudiye Armenian and Greek district of Eskişehir.

After the Seljuks conquered the city from the Byzantines, the city became known as Sultanönü. In 1097, it was the site of the significant Battle of Dorylaeum of the First Crusade, in which the Crusaders defeated the Seljuk Turkish sultan Kilij Arslan I. The city later fell to the Seljuks in the 13th century.

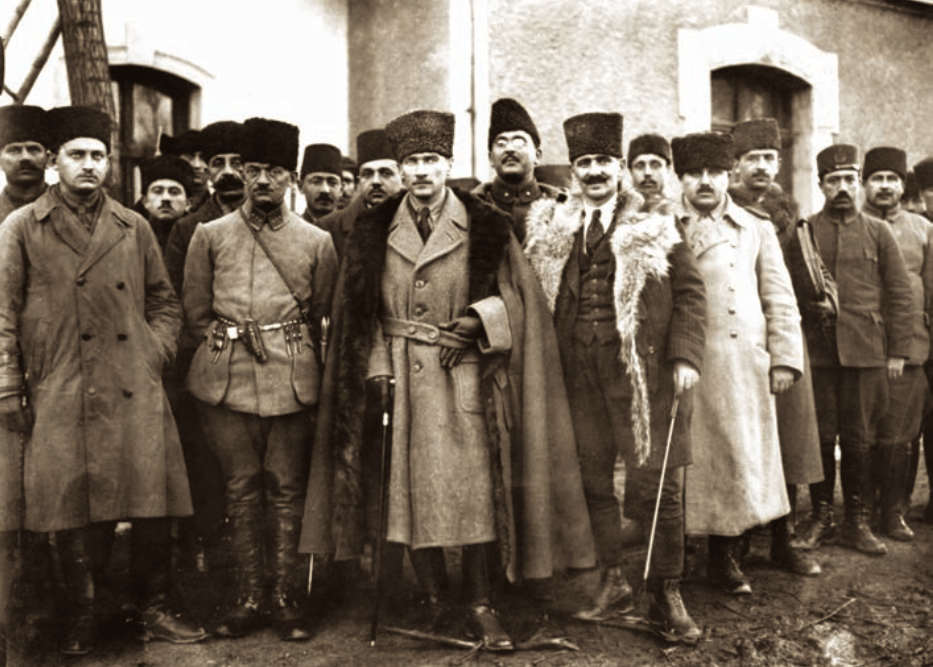
Speaker of the Turkish Grand National Assembly Mustafa Kemal inspecting the Western Front, Eskişehir, December 4, 1920.

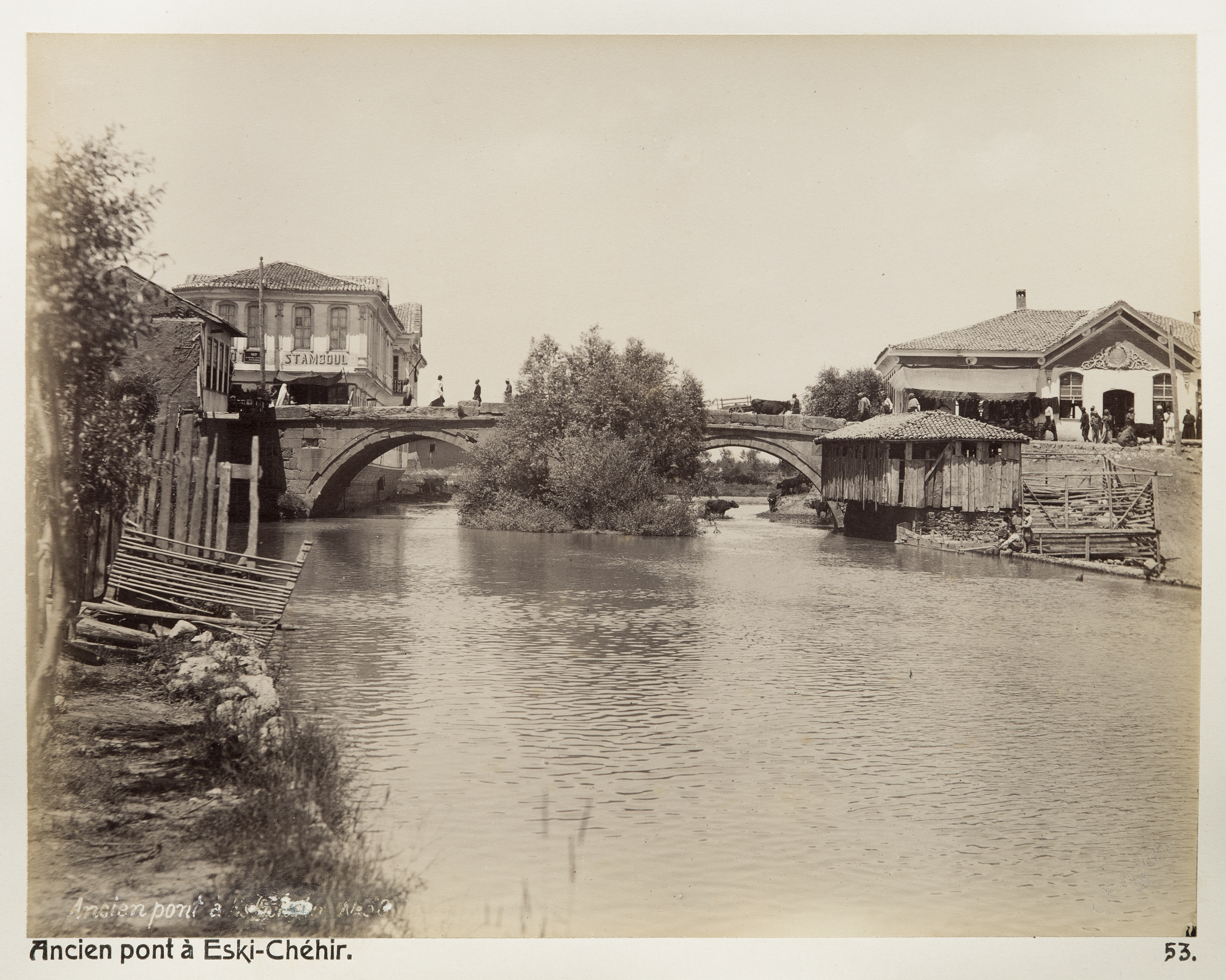
Bridge in Eskichéhir, Image from the von Hallwyl family's journey through Asia Minor and Turkey 27 April - 20 June 1901 - Hallwyl Museum.

From 1867-1922, Eskişehir was part of the Hüdavendigâr vilayet. In 1921, it was captured by the invading Greek Army. Eskişehir holds the title of Cultural Capital of the Turkish World and UNESCO Capital of Intangible Cultural Heritage in 2013.

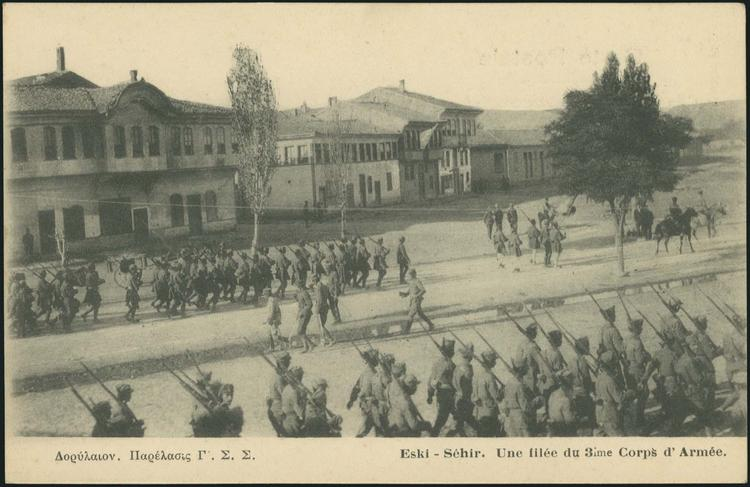
Eskişehir, 1921. Parade of the III Greek Army Corps

== Economy ==
Traditionally dependent on flour milling and brickyards, the city expanded with the building of railway workshops in 1894 for work on the Berlin–Baghdad railway.

As of 1920, Eskişehir was one of the major locations for meerschaum mining. At that time, most of the mining sites were owned by the state.

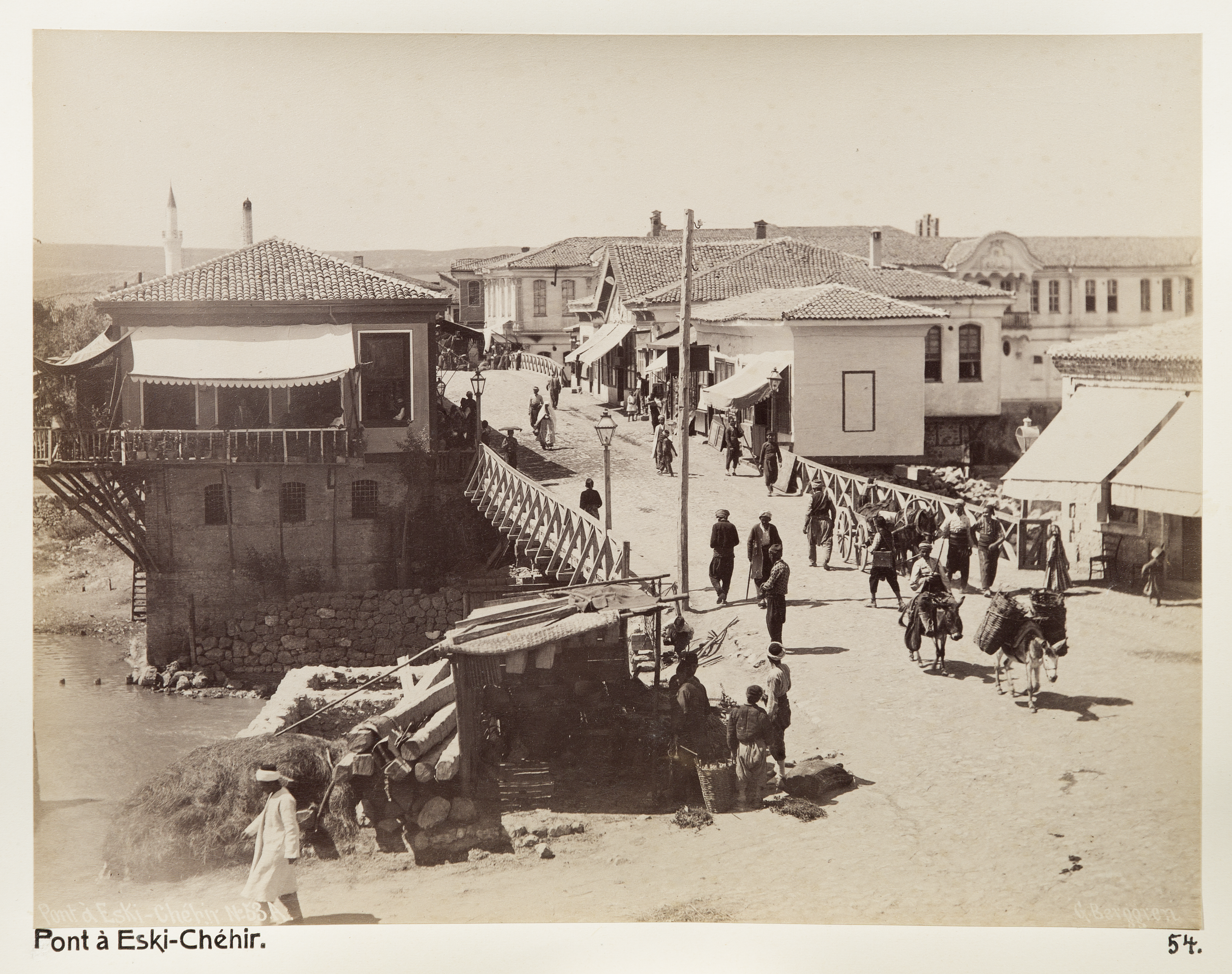
Image from the von Hallwyl family's journey through Asia Minor and Turkey 27 April - 20 June 1901 - Hallwyl Museum.

Devrim, the first Turkish automobile, was produced in 1961 at the TÜLOMSAŞ factory in Eskişehir. Devrim was never put into mass production and stayed a concept study; it can be viewed in the TÜLOMSAŞ factory in Eskişehir. In addition to production, the first Turkish steam powered locomotive called Karakurt was produced at the TÜLOMSAŞ factory in 1961. Eskişehir was also the site of Turkey's first aviation industry (Aeronautical Supply Maintenance Centre) and its air base was the command centre of Turkey's first Tactical Air Force headquarters on NATO's southern flank during the Cold War.

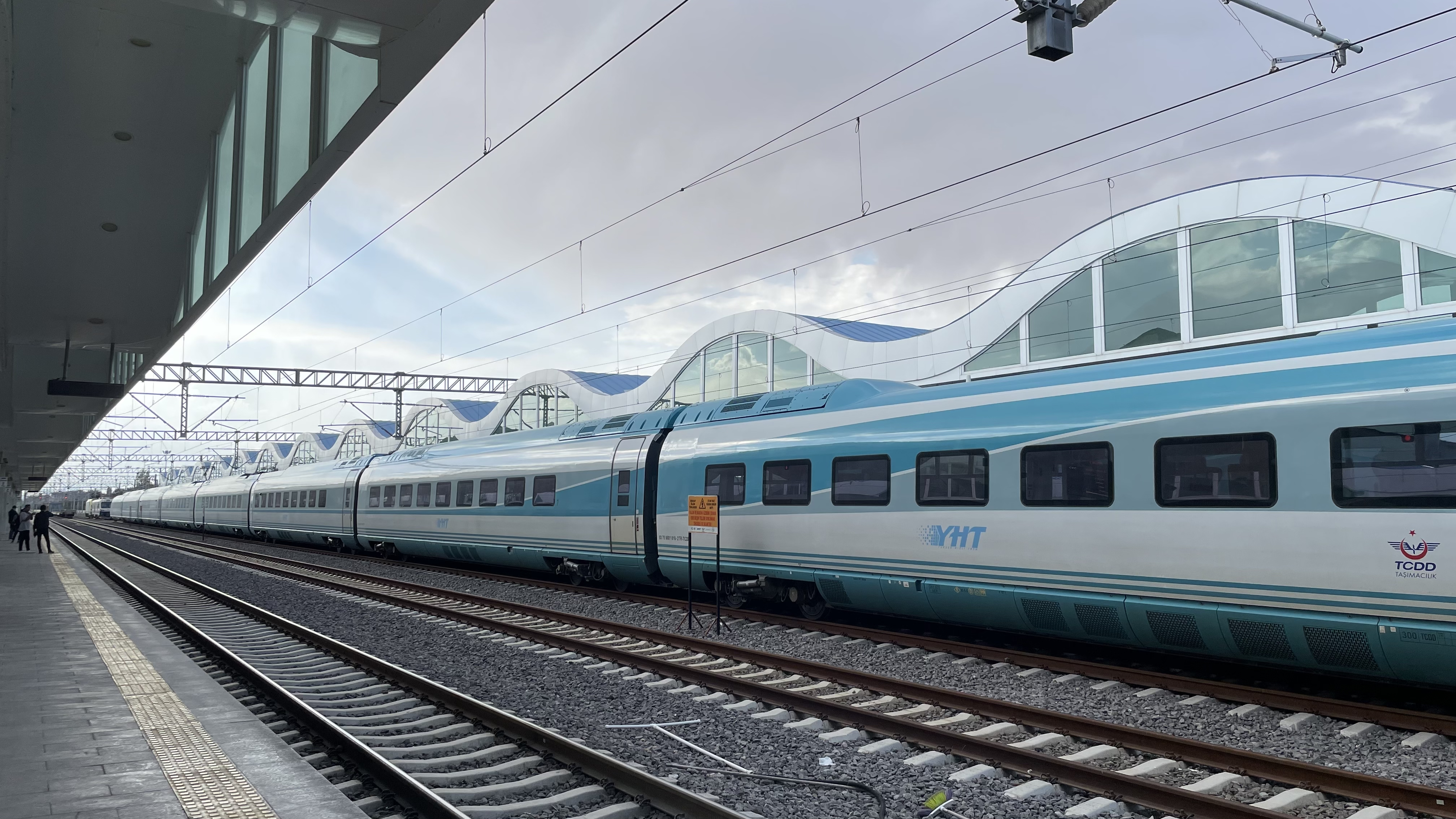
Eskişehir railway station

Eskişehir produces trucks, home appliances, railway locomotives, fighter aircraft engines, agricultural equipment, textiles, brick, cement, chemicals, processed meerschaum, and refined sugar. Eti, one of Turkey's largest food brands (mostly producing biscuits, chocolate, and candy), is based in Eskişehir. Arçelik, a major Turkish home appliances and consumer electronics manufacturer, has one of its production plants in Eskişehir. Eskişehir was the first stage of High-speed rail in Turkey from Ankara. This service improved the travel and commerce between Eskişehir and Ankara, thanks to reduced journey time. GKN, a major global automotive supplier for passenger and commercial car powertrain systems, has a plant in Eskişehir.

The city is served by the Hasan Polatkan Airport.

== Education ==
There are three universities in Eskişehir. These are the Anadolu University, Eskişehir Osmangazi University, and the Eskişehir Technical University, which is the first university in the world that gained the privilege of managing airports. Anadolu University, in addition to its on-campus studies, started open university courses through TV broadcasts in the 1980s, allowing access to tertiary education for thousands of students who otherwise would not have been able to benefit from any.

== Culture ==
The city has a significant population of Turkic Crimean Tatars. It also attracted ethnic Turks emigrating from Balkan countries such as Bulgaria, Romania, Bosnia, North Macedonia, and the Sandžak region of Serbia, who contributed to the development of the city's metalworking industries.

In 2013, Eskişehir hosted the inaugural Turkvision Song Contest, which aims to highlight music and artists from various Turkic-speaking regions. The city is also home to the Dünya Müzeleri Müzesi or Museum of World Museums.

Other museums in the city are Eti Archaeology Museum, Aviation Museum, Meerschaum Museum, Museum of Independence, Museum of Modern Glass Art, Tayfun Talipoğlu Typewriter Museum, Yılmaz Büyükerşen Wax Museum, and the Odunpazarı Modern Museum.

== Attractions ==
Most of modern-day Eskişehir was rebuilt after the Turkish War of Independence (1919–1923), but a number of historic buildings remain, such as the Kurşunlu Mosque. The archaeological site of the ancient Phrygian city of Dorylaeum is close to Eskişehir. The city is noted for its natural hot sulphur springs.

== Sports ==
Association football club Eskişehirspor, founded in 1965, plays in the TFF Second League after being relegated during the 2021-22 TFF First League. It plays its home games in the New Eskişehir Stadium.

== Geography ==
Eskişehir is situated on the banks of Porsuk River, which flows into the Sakarya River. Porsuk Dam, located near the Eskişehir-Kütahya border, controls the flow of the water in the river.

=== Climate ===
Köppen map of Eskişehir Province and surrounding regions:
- BSk
- Dsb

Eskişehir has a cold semi-arid climate (BSk) under the Köppen climate classification, and a temperate continental climate (Dc) under the Trewartha climate classification. The city features cold, snowy winters and warm, dry summers. Rainfall occurs mostly during the spring and autumn. Due to Eskişehir's high altitude and its dry summers, nightly temperatures in the summer months are cool. Precipitation levels are low, but precipitation can be observed throughout the year.

Climate data for Eskişehir (1991–2020, extremes 1928–2023)
Month	Jan	Feb	Mar	Apr	May	Jun	Jul	Aug	Sep	Oct	Nov	Dec	Year
Record high °C (°F)	20.3 (68.5)	21.8 (71.2)	28.1 (82.6)	31.1 (88.0)	35.0 (95.0)	36.8 (98.2)	40.6 (105.1)	41.6 (106.9)	38.4 (101.1)	34.2 (93.6)	27.1 (80.8)	21.4 (70.5)	41.6 (106.9)
Mean daily maximum °C (°F)	3.9 (39.0)	6.8 (44.2)	12.1 (53.8)	17.0 (62.6)	22.2 (72.0)	26.5 (79.7)	29.8 (85.6)	29.9 (85.8)	26.1 (79.0)	20.2 (68.4)	12.6 (54.7)	6.1 (43.0)	17.8 (64.0)
Daily mean °C (°F)	−0.1 (31.8)	1.5 (34.7)	5.4 (41.7)	9.9 (49.8)	14.8 (58.6)	18.9 (66.0)	21.9 (71.4)	21.9 (71.4)	17.5 (63.5)	12.1 (53.8)	5.8 (42.4)	1.7 (35.1)	10.9 (51.7)
Mean daily minimum °C (°F)	−4.0 (24.8)	−3.4 (25.9)	−0.8 (30.6)	2.8 (37.0)	7.2 (45.0)	11.0 (51.8)	13.6 (56.5)	13.6 (56.5)	9.1 (48.4)	5.0 (41.0)	0.0 (32.0)	−2.0 (28.4)	4.3 (39.8)
Record low °C (°F)	−27.8 (−18.0)	−28.6 (−19.5)	−12.0 (10.4)	−10.4 (13.3)	−2.2 (28.0)	0.5 (32.9)	5.0 (41.0)	4.8 (40.6)	−2.0 (28.4)	−6.8 (19.8)	−12.2 (10.0)	−19.2 (−2.6)	−28.6 (−19.5)
Average precipitation mm (inches)	33.0 (1.30)	28.2 (1.11)	29.9 (1.18)	44.1 (1.74)	42.3 (1.67)	24.2 (0.95)	15.0 (0.59)	11.2 (0.44)	17.2 (0.68)	35.0 (1.38)	33.4 (1.31)	42.4 (1.67)	355.9 (14.02)
Average precipitation days	9	8.6	8.8	8.33	7.23	4.83	2.43	2.13	3.3	6.33	6.77	9.43	77.18
Average snowy days	10.16	6.88	3.84	0.72	0	0	0	0	0	0	1.44	5.04	28.08
Mean monthly sunshine hours	80.6	110.2	164.3	192	254.2	297	350.3	319.3	261	189.1	135	74.4	2,427.4
Mean daily sunshine hours	2.6	3.9	5.3	6.4	8.2	9.9	11.3	10.3	8.7	6.1	4.5	2.4	6.6
Source: Turkish State Meteorological Service, Meteomanz(snowy days 2000-2024)

== Gallery ==
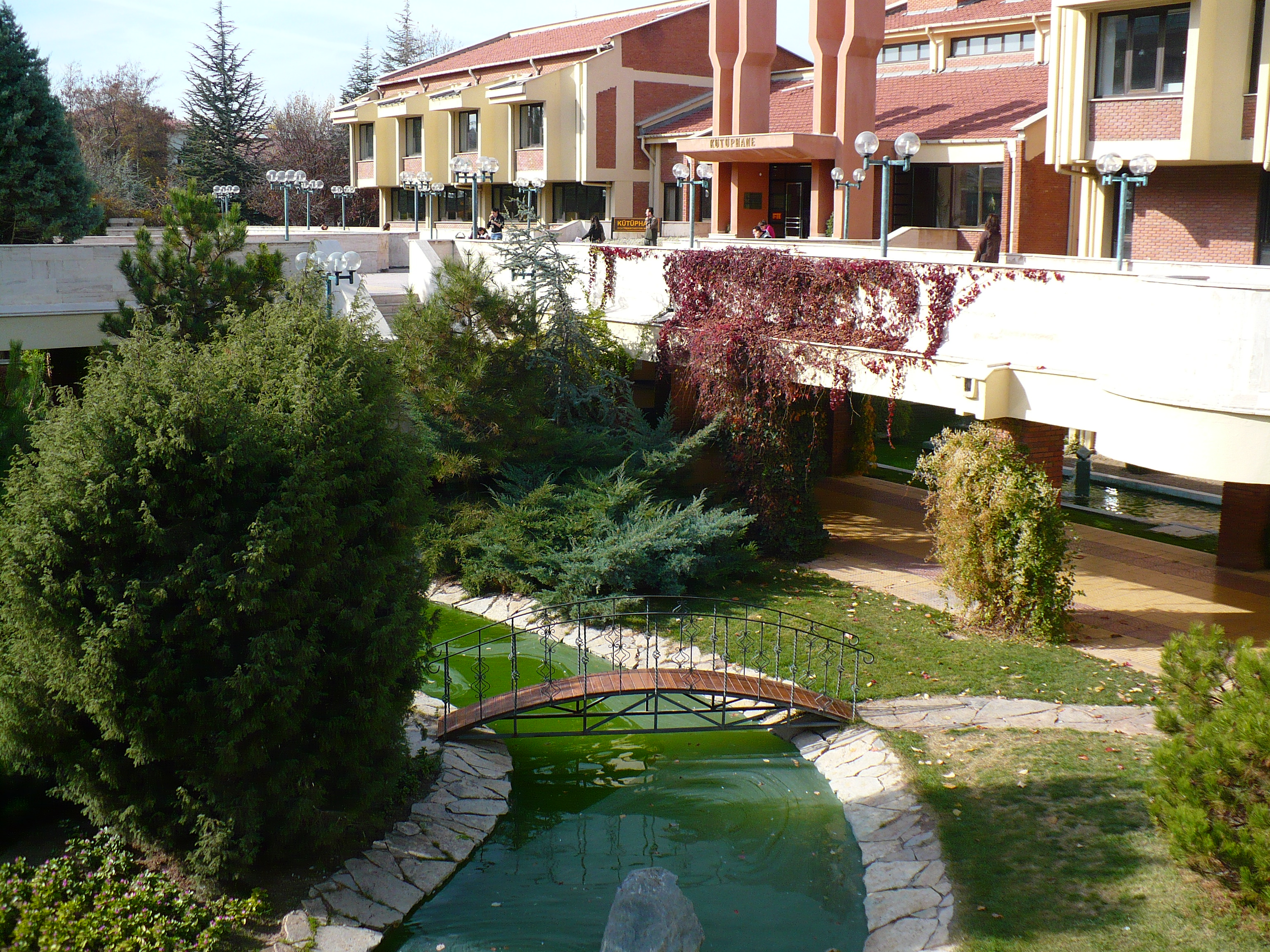
Library of the Anadolu University

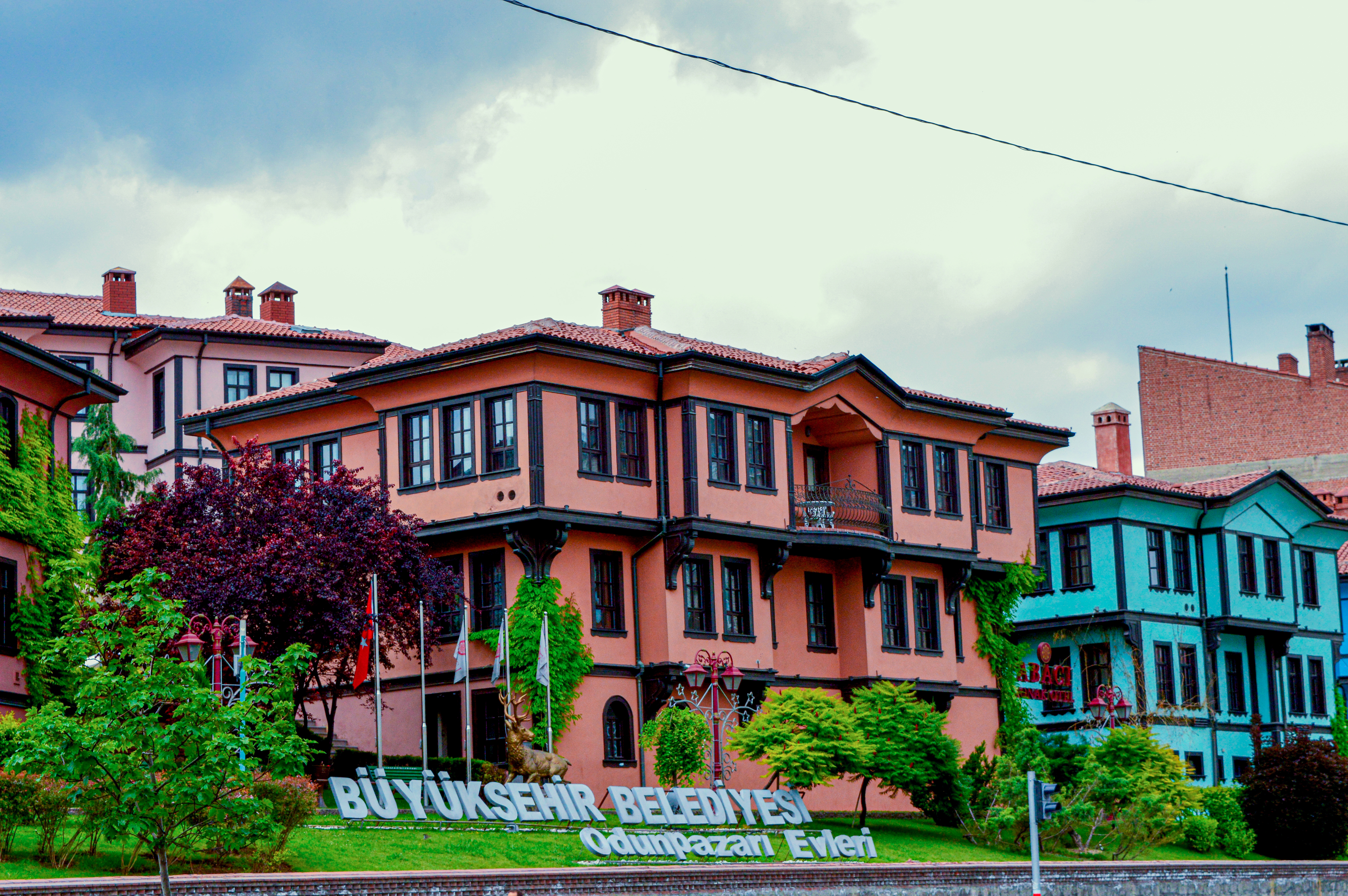
Ottoman architecture in Odunpazarı, Eskişehir

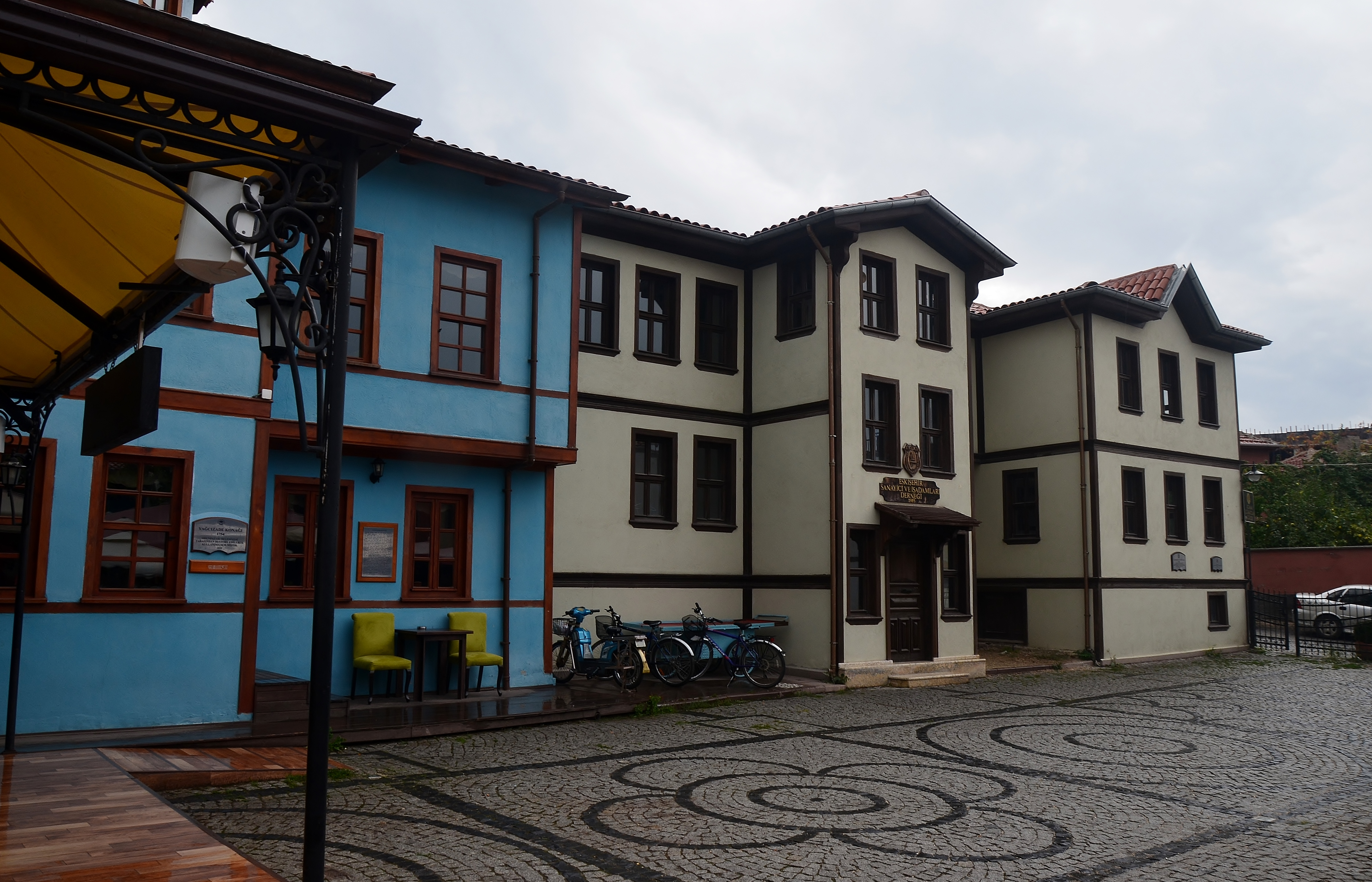
Streets of Odunpazarı, Eskişehir

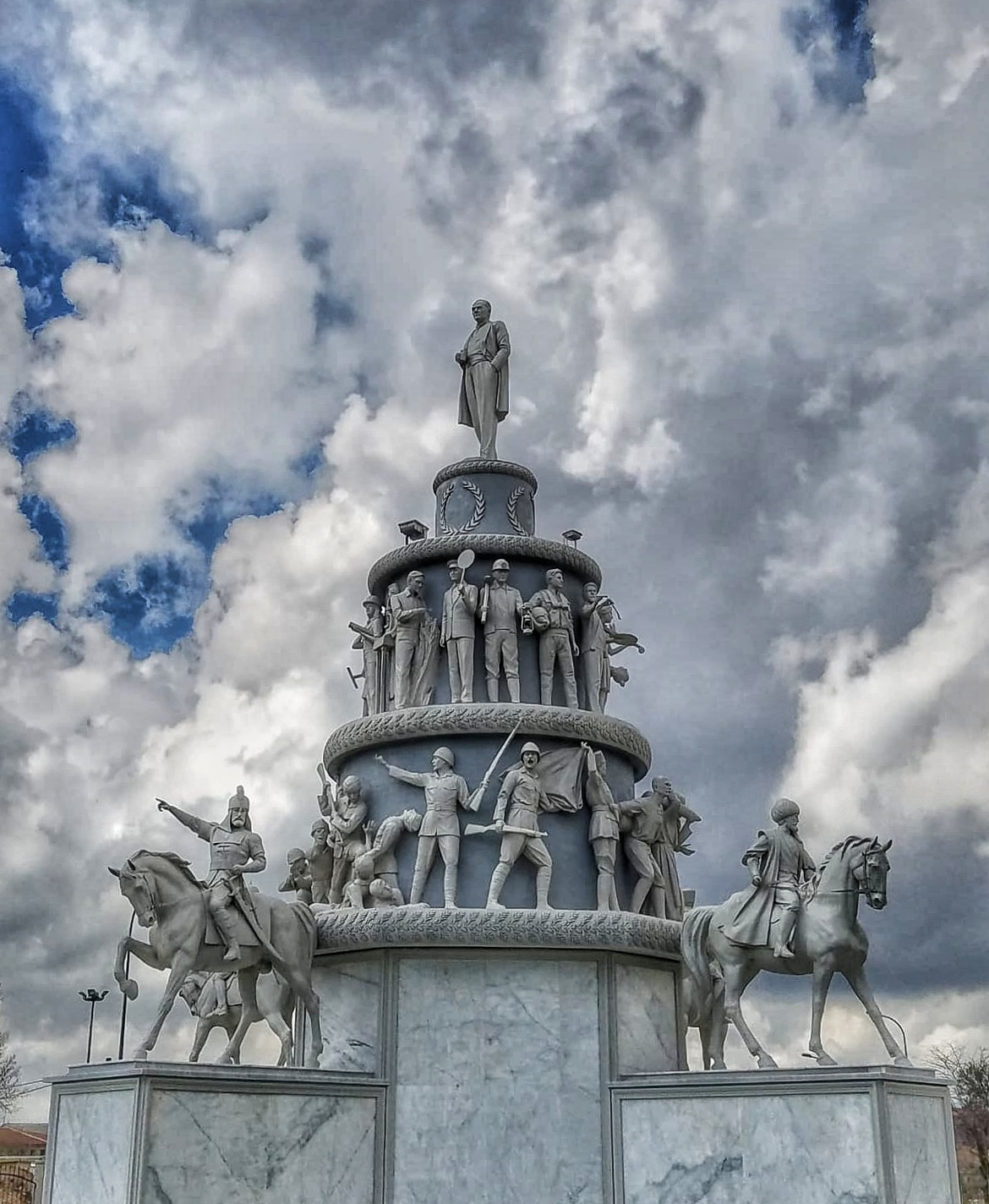
Ulus Monument in the city representing Mustafa Kemal Atatürk

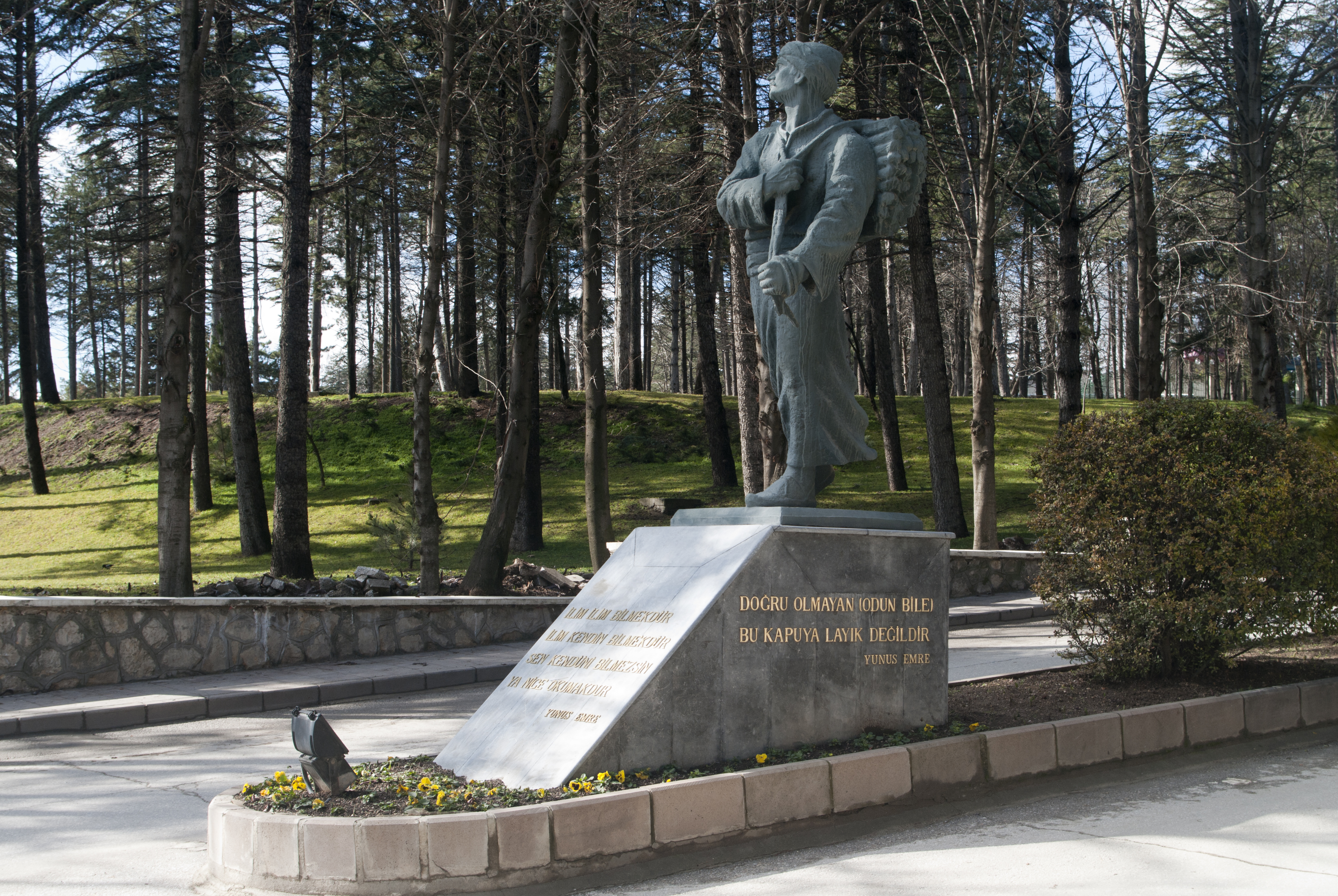
Statue of Yunus Emre in Eskişehir.

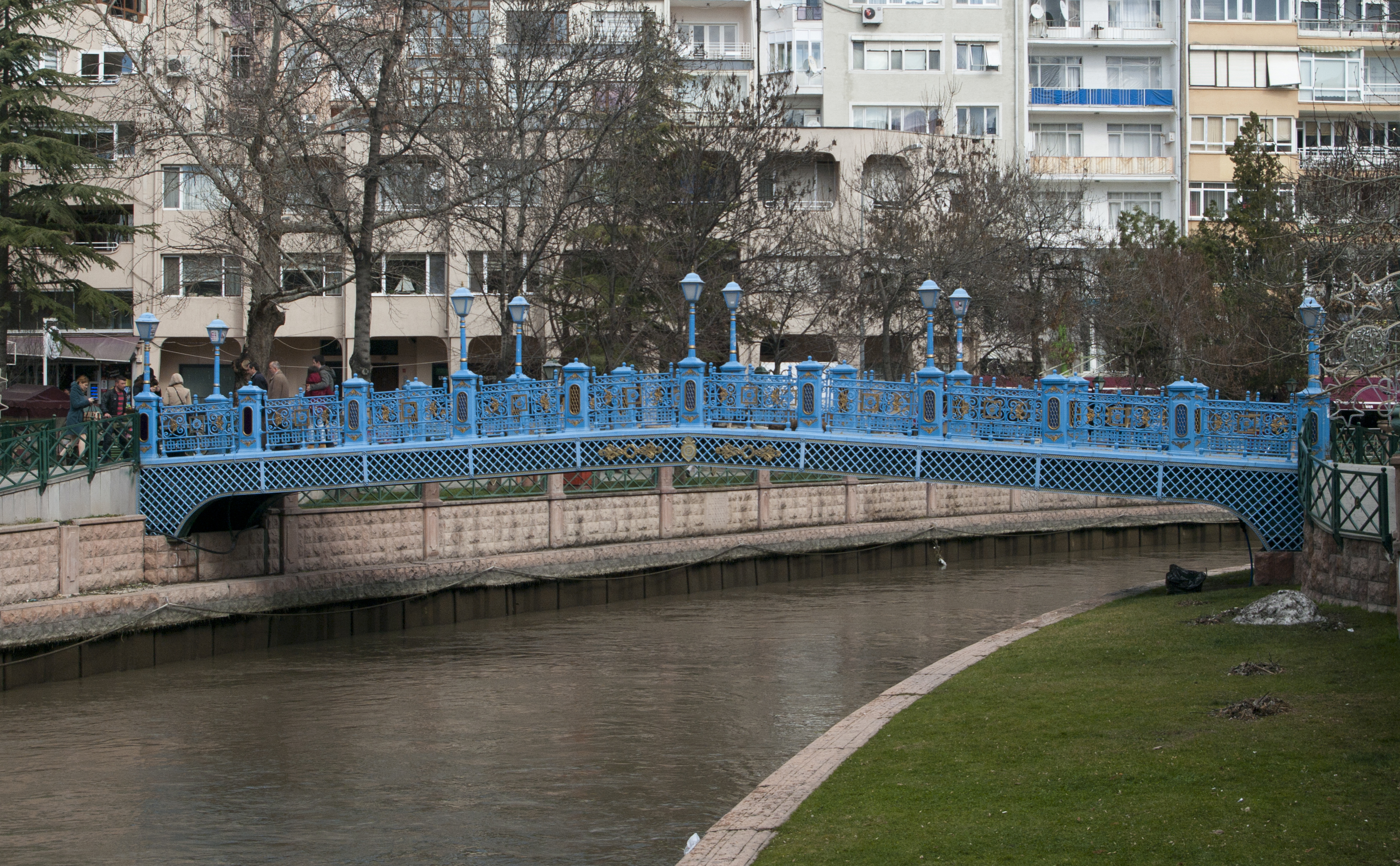
One of Eskişehir's many bridges across the Porsuk River.

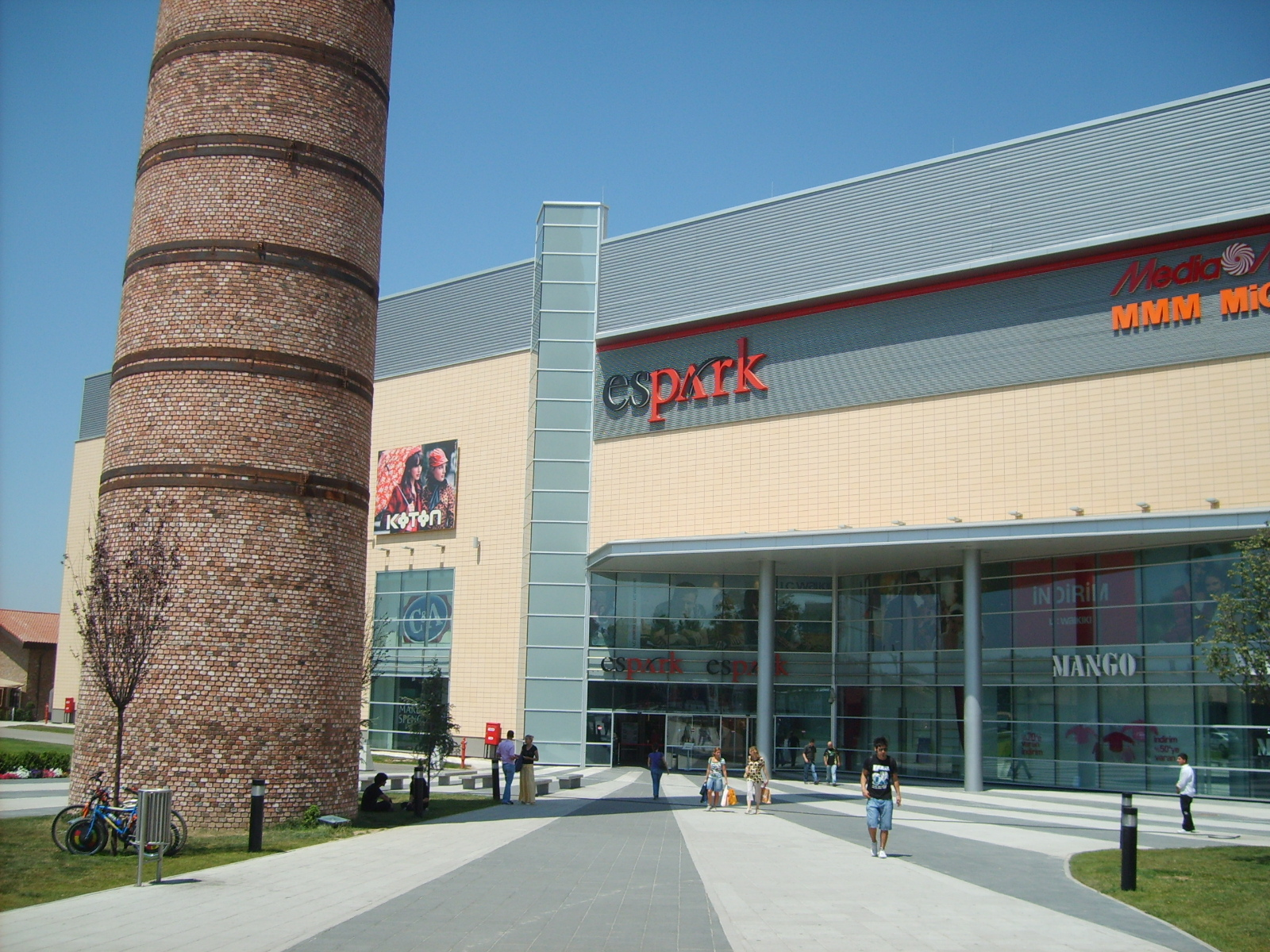
A shopping mall in Eskişehir

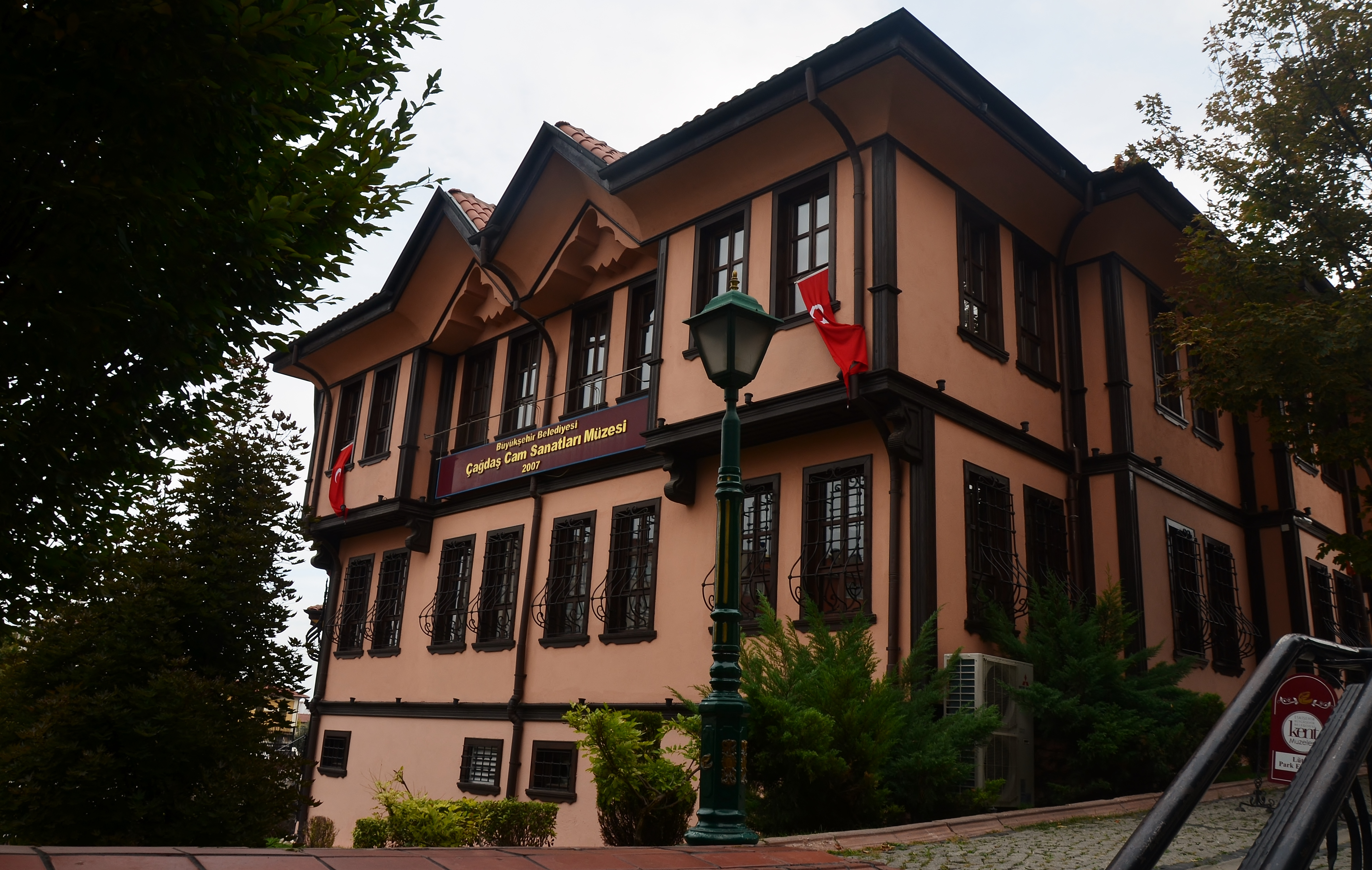
Eskişehir Modern Glass Art Museum

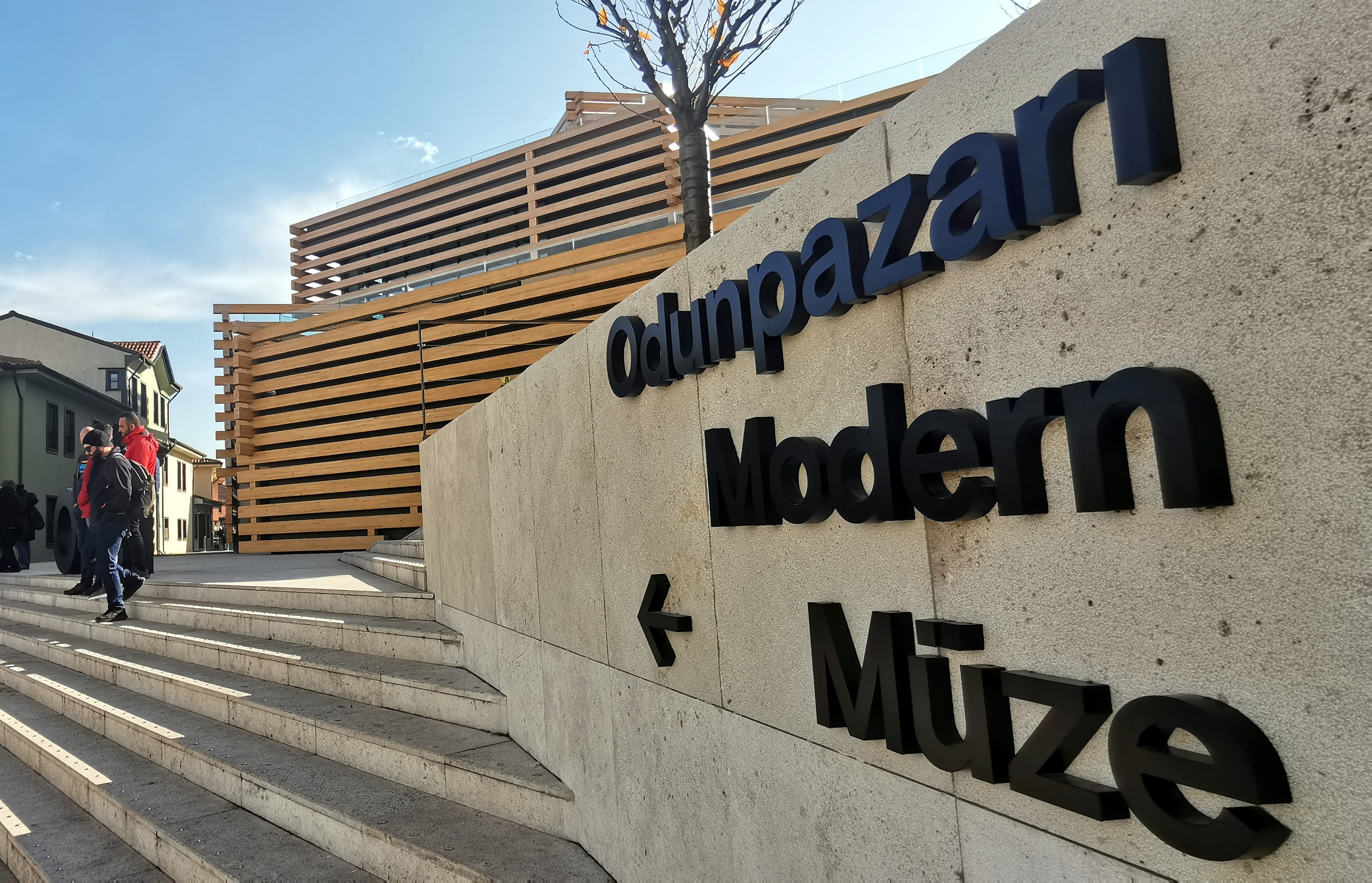
Odunpazarı Modern Arts Museum by the architect Kengo Kuma.

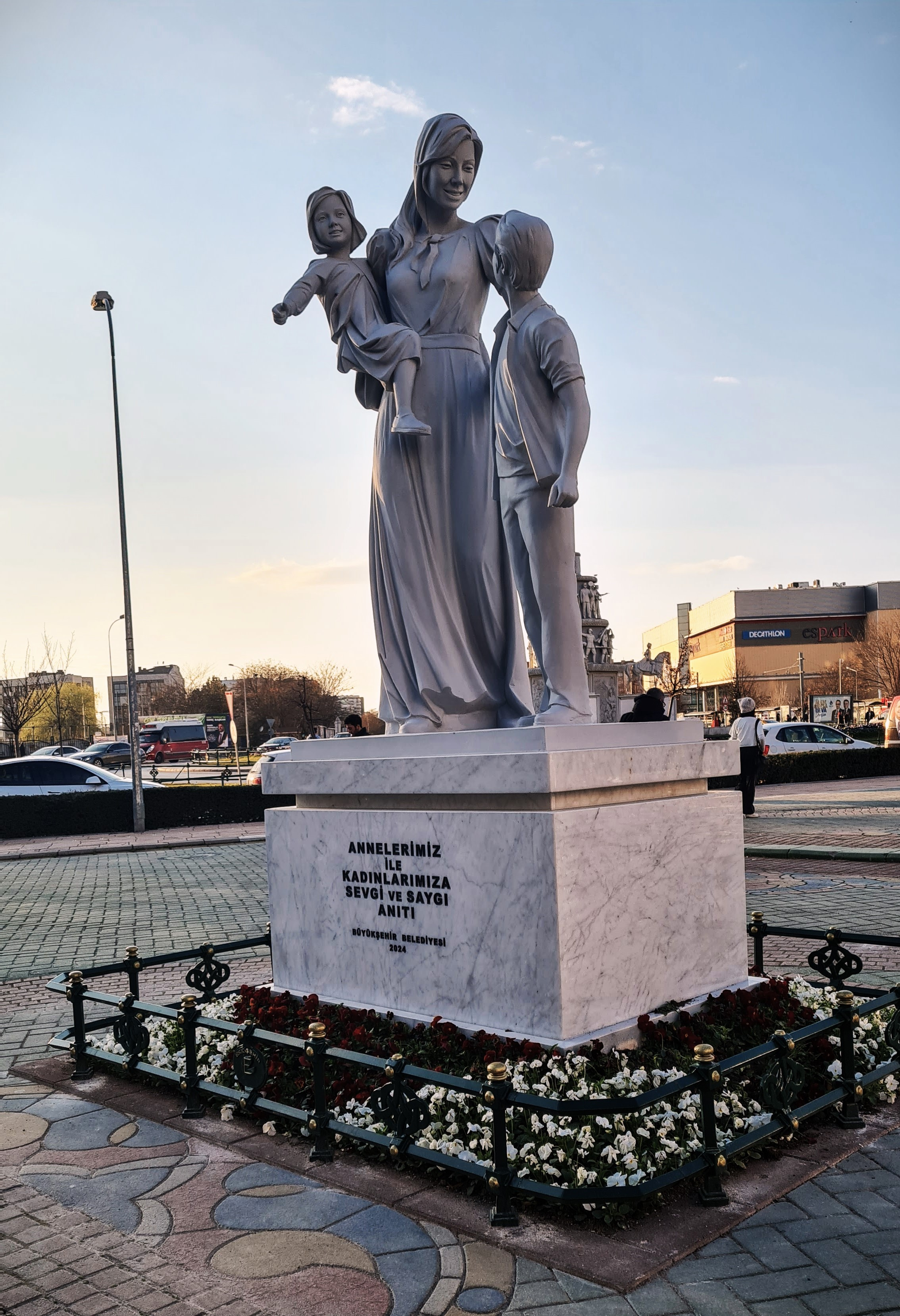
Eskişehir respect monument.

== Notable natives ==
- Eusebius of Dorylaeum – 5th-century bishop
- Battal Gazi – 8th-century Muslim saint buried in Seyitgazi
- Nikephoros Melissenos – 11th century Byzantine aristocrat, magistros, doux of Triaditza, usurper and Caesar
- Yunus Emre – 13th-century Turkish folk poet
- Adil Giray Pişiriçi – Crimean Khan, Ottoman Empire 1881–1941
- Sabrettin Giray Pişiriçi - Son of the Crimean Khan, Ottoman Empire Adil Giray Pişiriçi 1923-1976 Ağapınarı, Eskişehir Turkey
- Sheik Edebali – 13th century religious leader, spiritual founder of the Ottoman Empire
- Behiç Erkin - Turkish Schindler, first director (1920–1926) of the Turkish State Railways, Minister of Public Works (1926–1928), Turkish Ambassador (Budapest 1928–1939, Paris and Vichy 1939-1943)
- Yakup Satar - last Turkish veteran of the First World War
- Fahrettin Kerim Gökay - Professor, former mayor of Istanbul (1949–1957), former Turkish ambassador (Bern), former minister of state
- Yılmaz Büyükerşen - Professor, Reporter, Columnist, Caricaturist, Editor, former rector of Anadolu University, former member of RTYK, Professional Wax Sculptor
- Cüneyt Arkın - Actor, Director, Producer, Martial Artist, Doctor in Medicine
- Nuri Alço - Actor, Director, Producer
- Eqrem Çabej - Linguist and scholar
- Melis Birkan - Actress
- Zeki Sezer - former Leader of the Democratic Left Party DSP, Chemical Engineer, Minister of State (57th government)
- Hasan Polatkan - Politician
- Mehmet Terzi - Long-Distance Runner
- Gamze Bulut - Mid-Distance Runner
- Zeki Önder Özen - Football Manager
- Ömer Çatkıç - Football Goalkeeper
- Neslihan Demir Darnel - Volleyball Player
- İpek Şenoğlu - Tennis Player
- Ersan İlyasova - Basketball Player
- Kerem Gönlüm - Basketball Player
- Ceyhun Yıldızoğlu - Basketball Coach
- Asya (singer) - Pop Singer, Song-Writer
- Tuna Kiremitçi - Author, Poet, Columnist, Composer
- Enis Batur - Author, Lecturer
- Alper Erturk - Professor at Georgia Institute of Technology
- Gürer Aykal - Conductor, adjunct professor at Bilkent University
- Banu Avar - Writer and journalist
- Mete Erpek (Joker) - Rapper
- Meryem Boz - Volleyball Player
- Sertan Saltan - Artist and winner of 2011 BP Young Artist Award

== International relations ==
Eskişehir is twinned with:

- Shymkent, Kazakhstan (since 2018)
- (United States) Lansing, Michigan, US (since 2024)
- Cluj Napoca, Romania (since 2020)
- Changzhou, China (since 2009)
- Frankfurt am Main, Germany (since 2013)
- Kazan, Tatarstan, Russia (since 1995)
- North Nicosia, Northern Cyprus (since 2016)
- Kyrenia, Northern Cyprus (since 2016)
- Linz, Austria (since 2012)
- Bozüyük, Turkey (since 2025)
- Bilecik, Turkey (since 2025)
- Bodrum, Turkey (since 2010)
- Paju, South Korea (since 2007)
- Saint-Josse-ten-Noode, Belgium (since 2014)

== See also ==
- Anadolu University
- Boron
- Eskişehir Osmangazi University
- Meerschaum
- Türkvizyon Song Contest 2013
- Holy Trinity Church, Eskişehir
