= Eskişehir Eti Archaeology Museum =

- Eskişehir Eti Arkeoloji Müzesi
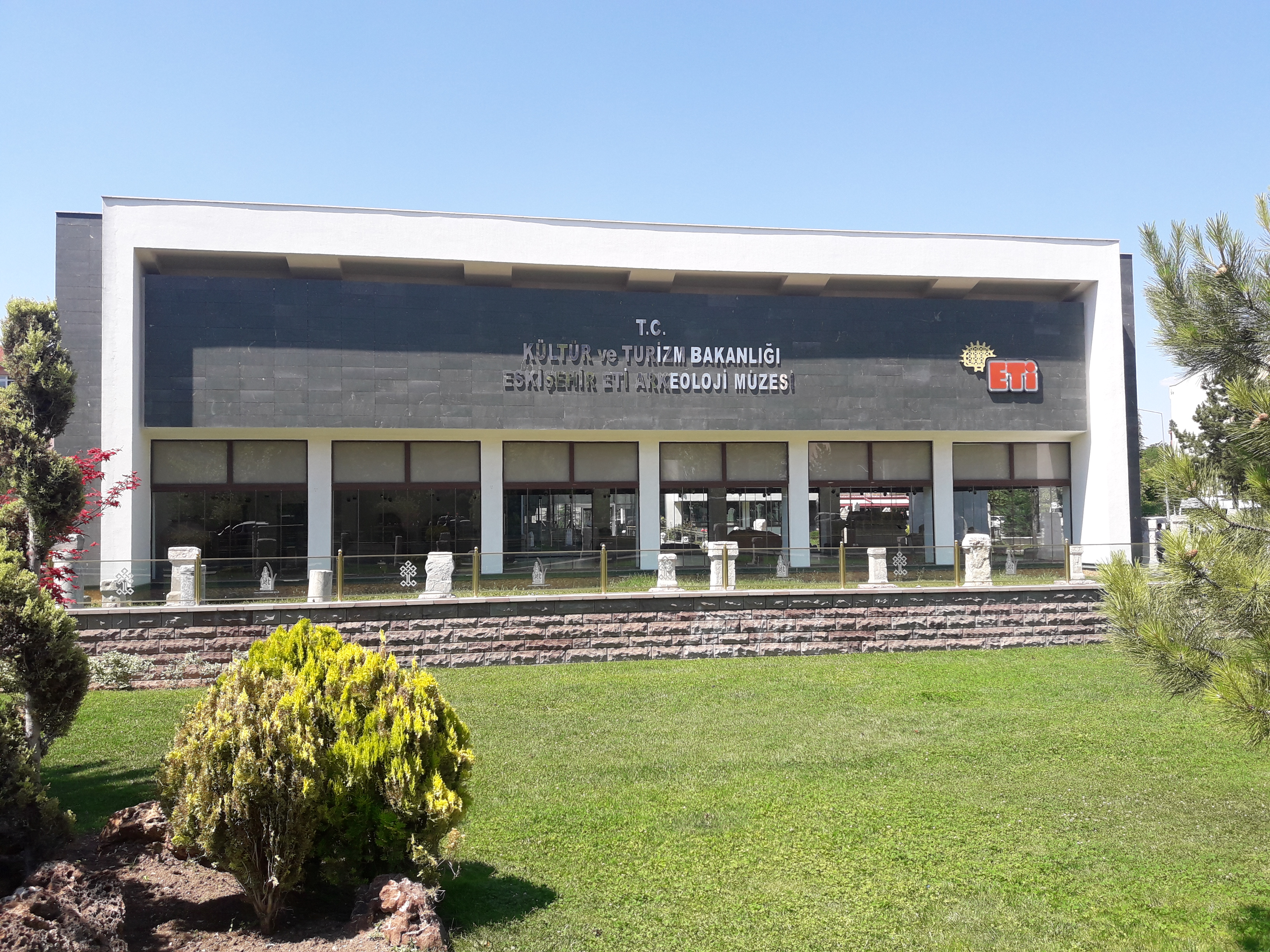
- Eskişehir Eti Archaeology Museum building

- Location of the museum in Turkey.
- Established: 1974; 52 years ago
- Type: Archaeology museum
- Collections: Neolithic, Chalcolithic, Bronze Age, Hittite, Phrygian, Hellenistic, Roman, Byzantine and Ottoman
- Collection size: 2,000 exhibited 20,500 stocks
- Owner: Ministry of Culture and Tourism

Eskişehir Eti Archaeology Museum, a.k.a. Eskişehir Archaeology Museum (Turkish: Eskişehir Eti Arkeoloji Müzesi), is a national archaeology museum in Eskişehir, Turkey. It was established in 1974.

== Location ==
The museum is located in the center of Eskişehir on Atatürk Boulevard at 39°45′57″N 30°30′48″E. The street to the east of the museum is Müze Street named after the museum.

== Background ==
The museum was initially established in 1966 in the Kurşunlu Complex, a religious complex building, which is about 1 km (0.62 mi) east of the current location. In 1974, the museum moved to its own building. As this building became insufficient, a new building was constructed, which was financed and donated by ETİ Food Industry, a cookie producer based in Eskişehir. On 28 May 2011, the museum was reopened in its new and larger building.

== Museum building ==
The total area of the museum, including the building and the yard, is 3,000 m^{2} (32,000 sq ft). The building consists of three blocks. One block is reserved for the administration and auxiliary services such as library, laboratory, photo lab, etc. The basement of the two other blocks are stock rooms. The ground floor of one block is a conference hall and the ground floor of the other block is multipurpose art gallery. The museum exhibition halls are situated in the upper floors of both blocks.

== Collection ==
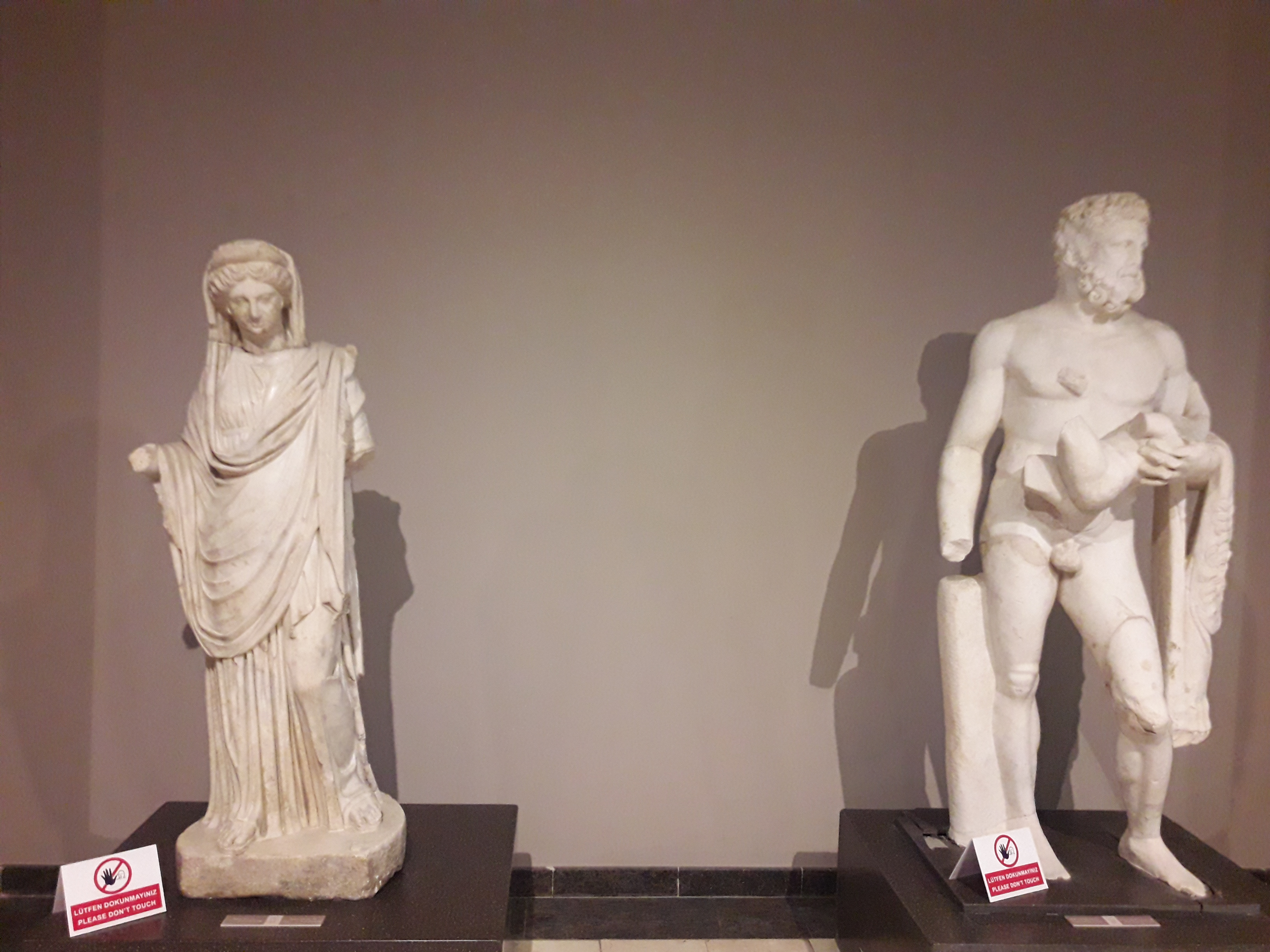
Eskişehir Eti Archaeology Museum

The exhibited items span Neolithic, Chalcolithic, Bronze Age, Hittite, Phrygian, Hellenistic, Roman, Byzantine and Ottoman periods. There are marble sculptures and figurines, steles, earthenware, metallic and glass gadgets for daily use, idols, ornaments, weapons etc. There is also an elephant tusk in the natural history section of the museum.
