= Sertan Saltan =

US-based Turkish artist

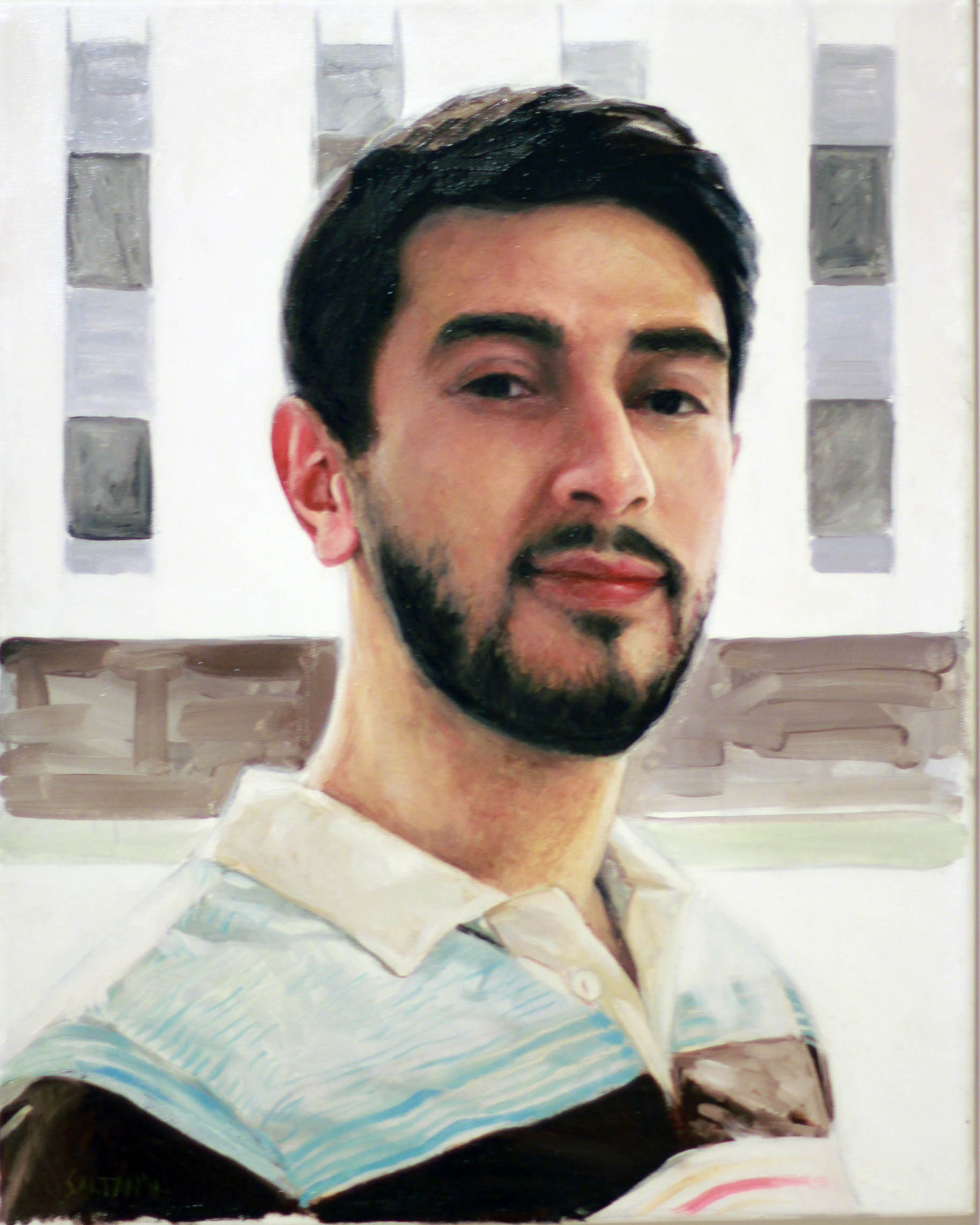
- Self-portrait
- Born: September 17, 1982 (age 43); Eskişehir, Turkey
- Education: Fashion Institute of Technology
- Notable work: "Mrs. Cerna"
- Style: Naturalistic
- Awards: BP Portrait Award 2011 (Young Artist)
- Website: www.sertansaltan.com Sertan Saltan on X

Sertan Saltan is a Denmark based Turkish artist whose work was acclaimed by international media after his winning of the BP Young Artist Award in 2011.

== Early life ==
Saltan was born in Eskişehir, Turkey on 17 September 1982. He was publicized as the 'Best young artist of England' by the Turkish media such as Sabah (newspaper) and 'Dogan Haber Ajansi' a major news agency in Turkey.

== Career ==
His work focuses on portraits, typically using oils as the primary media. He studied painting with Teymur Rzayev, a naturalistic painter, at his atelier in Istanbul before moving to the United States in 2006 to continue his studies at the Fashion Institute of Technology where he attained a Bachelor of Fine Arts degree in 2008. His work has been influenced by both Eastern and Western cultures. Mr. Saltan had several exhibitions in Turkey and the UK. Most recently he won the 'Young Artist Award' overall in the 2011 BP Portrait Award which is given to the top talented artists in their field from 2372 entries. He was also honored by the Commander of the Turkish Navy for his contributions to the naval exhibition in 2006.

== Public exhibitions ==
- BP Portrait Award, The National Portrait Gallery, London, 2011,
- Wolverhampton Art Gallery, Wolverhampton, 2011
- Aberdeen Art Gallery, Aberdeen, 2011-2012
- Istanbul Naval Museum, Istanbul, 2006
