= Dünya Müzeleri Müzesi =

Museum of World Museums
- Dünya Müzeleri Müzesi
- Established: 2013
- Location: Eskişehir, Turkey
- Coordinates: 39.779514°N 30.527262°E
- Website: www.dunyamuzelerimuzesi.com

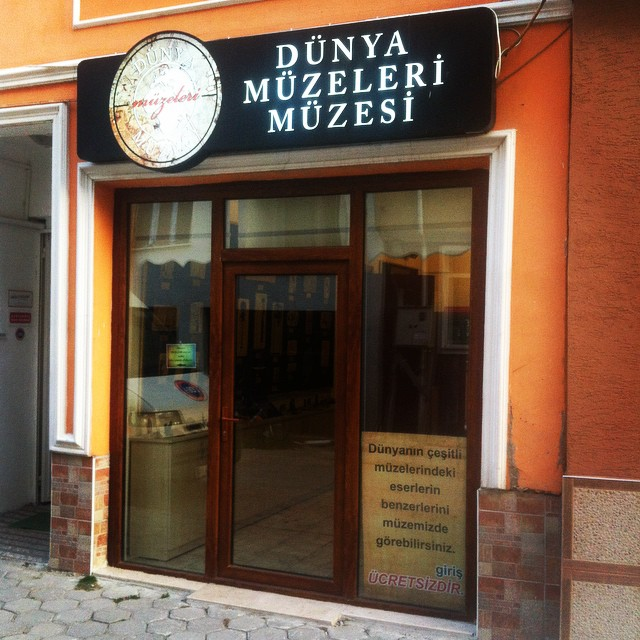

Museum of World Museums (Turkish: Dünya Müzeleri Müzesi) is a museum in Eskişehir, Turkey that displays reproductions whose originals appear in several historical areas and museums of the world. It has been established by the Aktiffelsefe Yeni Yüksektepe Kültür Derneği, a local cultural organization, and inaugurated on 8 May 2013, at Işıklar Mahallesi, Gültuğrul sokak No: 6. In its first year, the museum has been visited by more than 2000 people.

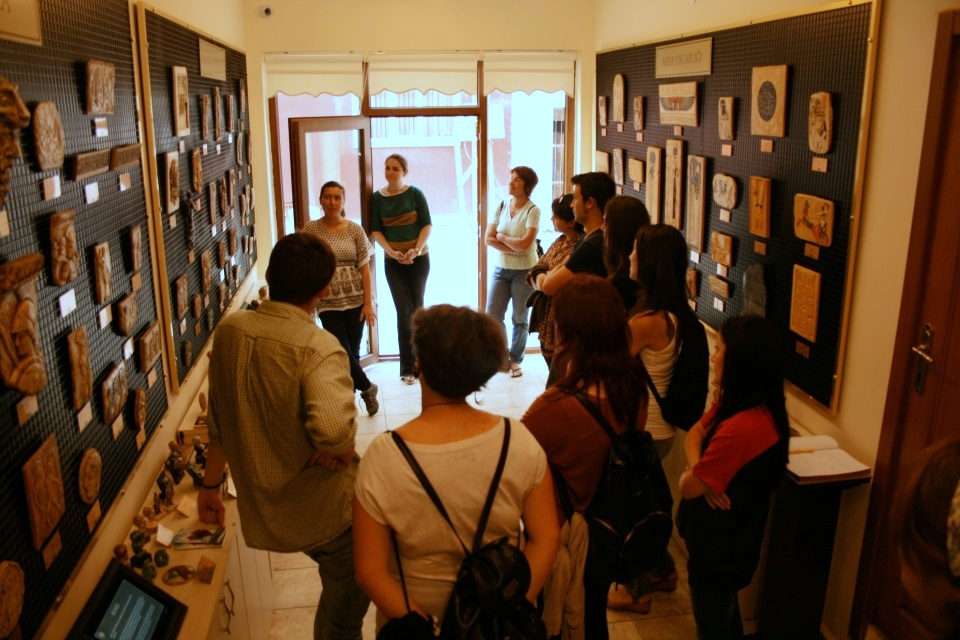

The collection of the Museum of World Museums contains more than 300 reproductions whose originals belong to 12 ancient civilizations and are exhibited in 28 museums and 20 historical sites from all around the world. The collection has also 15 pieces from Eskişehir. In the museum, the pieces are made by volunteers of Aktiffelsefe and also available to buy. Two of the three galleries of museum are used to exhibit the permanent collection of the museum; the other gallery is the garden of the building where the MuseCafe serves. There are also interactive areas such as presentations giving information about the ancient civilizations and the pieces, ancient play areas and a wheel of virtues.

The museum is open every day between the hours of 10:00 - 21:00 and is free to visit. Visitors are guided by volunteers of Aktiffelsefe. Sometimes several activities such as conferences, workshops and exhibitions about ancient civilizations, mythology, history etc. are organized by the volunteers of Aktiffelsefe.
