= Holy Trinity Church, Eskişehir =

Historical Armenian Apostolic temple

Coordinates: 39.7771°N 30.5191°E

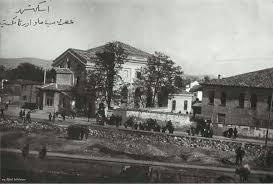
The building when it was a church

The Holy Trinity Church (Turkish: Kutsal Üçlü Ermeni Kilisesi, Armenian: Սուրբ Երրորդություն եկեղեցի) or Surp Yerrortut'yun Church is a historical Armenian Apostolic temple in the former Armenian quarter called Hoshnudiye (nowadays Tepebaşı) of the Western Turkish town of Eskishehir. It was turned into an adult theater after the Armenians of the town were deported and killed during the Armenian genocide.

The church was built in the 19th century. After the Armenian genocide in 1915, the church was sold by the Turkish state and used as the Asri Cinema of 1945 which showed sex movies only after 1974. A restoration plan started in 2009. The church building is currently used as the Zübeyde Hanım Cultural Centre named after the mother of the founding father of Turkey, Mustafa Kemal Atatürk.

== Sources ==
- "Eskişehir'de Hırant Dink Anıldı" (in Turkish). 18 January 2015. (in Turkish)
- "İşte çözemediğimiz problem" (in Turkish). 5 November 2008. (in Turkish)
