= Eskişehir Technical University =

Public university in Eskişehir, Turkey

Coordinates: 39.81590°N 30.53155°E

- Eskişehir Teknik Üniversitesi
- Other name: ESTU
- Motto in English: 1- Innovation for Future 2- We are as strong as our graduates
- Type: State university, Technical university
- Established: 2018
- Academic staff: 660+
- Students: 12000+
- Location: Eskişehir, Turkey
- Language: English (100%), English (30%), Turkish (100%)
- Colours: Red, white and grey
- Website: www.eskisehir.edu.tr

Eskişehir Technical University (ESTU) is a state technical university in Turkey. On May 18, 2018, it started to provide education in Eskişehir with five faculties, three institutes and two vocational schools in two different campuses. As of 2019, the university continues its education with 1,317 staff and more than 12,000 students.

The university is the only university in Turkey that provides piloting training by the state.

Thanks to the Hasan Polatkan Airport it contains, it is one of the largest universities in Turkey. The university has the world's first licensed university airport with its operating license in 2007.

The only center in Turkey where seismic isolators can be tested is at ESTU. ESTU Seismic Isolator Center is also one of the top 5 centers in the world. ESTU is one of the rare universities that offer pilot training, and the piloting program is among the departments that accept students with the highest score.

== History ==
Eskişehir Technical University was founded with the transfer of various educational units of Anadolu University. The Law No. 7141 published in the Official Gazette of the Republic of Turkey numbered 30425 on May 18, 2018.

== Academic Units ==
There are 5 faculties: Faculty of Engineering, Faculty of Aviation and Space Sciences, Faculty of Science, Faculty of Architecture and Design, and Faculty of Sports Sciences. There are 3 institutes, namely Institute of Graduate Education, Institute of Transportation Sciences, Institute of Earth and Space Sciences. There are 2 vocational schools, namely Porsuk Vocational School and Transportation Vocational School.

Iki Eylul campus is 5 kilometers from the city center. Hasan Polatkan Airport is also on this campus. The control of this airport belongs to Eskişehir Technical University.

=== Faculties ===
==== Faculty of Engineering ====
It was established in 1970 as "Eskişehir State Engineering-Architecture Academy". In 1983, it was named "Faculty of Engineering and Architecture". In 1993, it was transferred to Osmangazi University with the infrastructure, machinery and equipment of the faculty. It was renewed in 1994 and started education again. In 2012, the department of architecture within the faculty was separated and the name of the faculty was changed to "Engineering Faculty".

- Electrical and Electronics Engineering (English)
- Computer Engineering (English)
- Materials Science and Engineering (English)
- Industrial Engineering
- Environmental Engineering
- Chemical Engineering
- Civil Engineering
- Mechanical Engineering
- Aeronautical Engineering (English)

===== Faculty of Engineering Interdisciplinary Programs =====
- Mechatronics
- Sustainable Clean Energy
- Autonomous Vehicles Technology
- Artificial Intelligence and Machine Learning
- Software and Optimization

==== Faculty of Aeronautics and Astronautics ====
It was established in 1986 as 'Civil Aviation Vocational School'. It was renamed 'Civil Aviation College' in 1992. In 2012, it was named 'Faculty of Aviation and Space Sciences'.

- Flight Training
- Avionics
- Airframe and Powerplant Maintenance
- Aviation Management
- Air Traffic Control
- Aerospace Engineering (English)

==== Faculty of Science ====
- Mathematics
- Physics
- Chemistry
- Biology
- Statistics
- Information Security Technology (English)
- Information Systems and Technologies (English)

===== Faculty of Science Interdisciplinary Programs =====
- Business Analytics
- Chemical, Biological, Radiological and Nuclear (CBRN) Defense
- Nanoscience

==== Faculty of Architecture and Design ====
Architecture department was separated from the Faculty of Engineering and Architecture. It was established in 2011 as "Faculty of Architecture and Design".

- Interior Design
- Architecture
- Industrial Architecture
- Textile and Fashion Design

==== Faculty of Sport Sciences ====
It was established in 1993 as the "School of Physical Education and Sports". In 2013, it was renamed as "Faculty of Sports Sciences".

- Coach Training in Sports
- Physical Education and Sports Teaching
- Recreation and Sports
- Sports Management

=== School of Foreign Languages ===
==== Basic Foreign Languages ====
Preparatory training is given in English, German and French. The preparatory program is compulsory in departments where education is given in a foreign language. Departments providing education in Turkish can optionally receive preparatory education.

==== Modern Foreign Languages ====
While continuing their academic education, students can study Japanese, Chinese, Spanish, Italian, Russian, French, German and English at different levels.

=== Institutes ===
==== Graduate School of Education ====
It was established in 2019

- Electrical and Electronics Engineering
- Flight Training
- Advanced Technologies
- Computer Engineering
- Environmental Engineering
- Industrial Engineering
- Civil Engineering
- Mechanical Engineering
- Materials Science and Engineering
- Biology
- Industrial Arts
- Physics
- Aviation Electrics and Electronics
- Air Traffic Control
- Statistics
- Chemistry
- Chemical Engineering
- Mathematics
- Architecture
- Ceramic Engineering
- Civil Aviation
- Airframe and Powerplant Maintenance
- Remote Sensing and Geographic Information Systems
- Earth Sciences
- Interior Architecture
- Fashion and Textile Design
- Rail Systems Engineering
- Physical Education and Sports
- Sports Management
- Logistics Management
- Movement and Training Sciences
- Aviation Management

==== Institute of Transportation Sciences ====
It was established in 1993 as "Transportation Economics Research Institute". In 2012, it was named "Institute of Transportation Sciences". It is the first and only institute working in this field.

==== Institute of Earth and Space Sciences ====
In 1989, Remote Sensing and Geographic Information Systems studies started. It was established in 1993 as "Satellite and Space Sciences Research Institute". In 2012, it was named "Institute of Earth and Space Sciences".

- Geodesy and Geographic Information Technologies
- Satellite and Space Sciences
- Earth Sciences and Earthquake Engineering

=== Vocational Schools ===
==== Porsuk Vocational School ====
- Printing and Publishing Technologies
- Computer Programming
- Generation, Transmission and Distri.of Ele
- Radio and Television Technology
- Mechatronich
- Unmanned Aerial Vehicle Technology and Operations
- Mechanical Drawing and Construction
- Graphic Design
- Building Inspection

==== Vocational School of Transportation ====
- Logistics
- Railroad Electric and Electronics
- Railroad Machine Technology
- Railroad Construction
- Rail Transport Mechanic Training
- Civil Aviation Cabin Services
- Railroad Transportation Management
- Transportation and Traffic Services

== Student Teams and Clubs ==
There are 18 student clubs at the university.

There are 5 engineering teams, namely Hidroana, ESTU Solar Team, ESTU UAV, Autonomous Vehicle Team and RovsTech, which carry out R&D studies. These engineering teams have achieved degrees in various national and international competitions.

=== Student Engineering Teams ===
Student Engineering Teams
Student Engineering Teams	Explanation
ESTU UAV (Unmanned Aerial Vehicle)	This team tries to develop unmanned aerial vehicles. This team participates in competitions.
ESTU Solar Team (Solar Powered Vehicle Kit)	This team tries to develop electric vehicles using solar energy. This team participates in competitions.
Hydroana (Hydrogen & Electric Vehicle Kit)	This team tries to develop electric vehicles using hydrogen. This team participates in competitions.
Autonomous Vehicle Kit	This team tries to develop autonomous vehicles. This team participates in competitions.
RovsTech (Unmanned Underwater Autonomous Vehicle Project Team)	This team tries to develop underwater autonomous vehicles. This team participates in competitions.

=== Student Clubs ===
Student clubs
Club Names	Explanation
Eskişehir Technical University Student Branch Club (IEEE)	The aim of the IEEE Eskişehir Technical University Student Branch club is to conduct studies on the development of engineering theory and practice in electrical, electronics, computer, automation, telecommunications, social and many other fields.
Defense Industry and Technologies Club (SASTEK)	They organize activities to increase the interest in Defense Industry products and to direct students to this field.
Industry and Productivity Club	They organize seminars and start-up events with regional and country companies or important people belonging to those companies.
European Electrical Engineering Students Club (EESTEC)	They participate in engineering and workshops in Europe and organize trips to Europe.
Firefly Club	The club organizes social events based on Atatürk's Principles. In addition, they bring high school students together with the university and give preliminary information before university.
Environment and Sustainability Club	Carries out activities related to the environment.
Dance club	They perform dance activities.
Erasmus Club	They organize activities that help the students participating in the Erasmus Program to socialize and organize.
Photography Club	They do photography related activities.
Career and Entrepreneurship Club	They carry out studies related to seminars and events related to Career and Entrepreneurship.
Chemistry and Technologies Club	It is a club that shares information about chemistry and organizes events.
Motorsports Club	It was established to increase interest in motorsports.
Recreation and Activity Club	Social, environmental, education, social, health, sports, culture, art, financial literacy.
Data Science Club	A club where individuals who want to improve themselves in terms of Software, Machine Learning and Programming come together.
Art Activities Club	It is a group where individuals who are interested in art gather together and do activities.
Civil Aviation Club	It aims to raise awareness in terms of Civil Aviation.
Sports and Life Club	It aims to contribute to the development of talented and resourceful individuals in its own department dealing with sports.
Design Club	It is a club that aims to offer internship opportunities to students in the field of Architecture and Design.

== Academies Established With The Cooperation of ESTU and Industry ==
=== ESTU - Ford Otosan Academy ===
ESTU - Ford Otosan Academy was established with the protocol signed between Eskişehir Technical University and Ford Otosan Eskişehir.

=== ESTU - Alp Havacılık Academy ===
Eskişehir Technical University and Alp Aviation Industry and Trade Inc. ESTU - Alp Aviation Academy was established with the protocol signed between.

=== ESTU - Basarsoft Academy ===
Eskişehir Technical University and Başarsoft Bilgi Teknolojileri A.Ş. ESTU - Başarsoft Academy was established with the protocol signed between.

=== ESTU - Netcad Academy ===
Eskişehir Technical University and Netcad Yazılım A.Ş. ESTU - Netcad Academy was established with the protocol signed between.

=== ESTU - Vitra Academy ===
ESTU - Vitra Academy was established with the protocol signed between Eskişehir Technical University and Eczacıbaşı - Vitra.

== Campuses ==
Eskisehir Technical University; It serves on a total area of 5,696,400 m2, including İki Eylül Campus, Porsuk Campus, and Borabey Campus. In addition, within the Anadolu University Campus area, there are the service buildings of the Faculty of Science and Architecture and Design, and the Nanoboyut Research Laboratory. ESTU is one of only two universities on a global scale with its own airport on campus.

=== İki Eylül Campus ===
Iki Eylul Campus is located in the north of the city and 5 km away from the city. The total area of the campus is 4.530.000 m2, of which 273.330 m2 is green space.

Units located at İki Eylül Campus;

- Faculty of Aeronautics and Astronautics,
- Engineering faculty,
- Sports Science Faculty,
- Graduate Education Institute,
- Earth and Space Sciences Institute,
- School of Foreign Languages,
- Open and Distance Education Application and Research Center (ESTUZEM),
- Environmental Problems Application and Research Center (ÇEVMER),
- Advanced Technologies Application and Research Center (ITAM),
- Civil Aviation Research and Application Center,
- Hasan Polatkan Airport, Terminal Block, Tower and Hangars,
- Academic Club,
- Medico Social Center,
- Student and Staff Dining Halls,
- Outdoor sports facility (a tartan track and a turf football field),
- Indoor sports facility (5,000-seat gym and branch halls).

=== Porsuk Campus ===
Porsuk campus is located in the city center and has a total area of 20,700 m2. 13,977 m2 of this is green area and the rest consists of the college building, social spaces and sports facilities.

Units located in the Porsuk Campus:

- Porsuk Vocational School
- Transportation Vocational School,
- Institute of Transport Sciences.

=== Borabey Campus ===
The total area of the Borabey campus is 1,145,700 m2.

== Sports Facilities ==
=== Eskişehir Technical University Sports Hall ===
It has a closed area of 22,800 square meters and a capacity of 5003 spectators. In addition to academic and sports events within the university, it hosts national and international competitions and organizations.

Basketball, Volleyball and Handball competitions are held in the gym. There is a hall where archery athletes can train.

There is a fitness center with an area of 614 square meters.

The sauna, which was put into use in 2014, has a capacity of 12 people. In this section, there are 2 dressing rooms, 2 relaxation rooms and 1 massage room.

=== The Sports Facility of The Faculty of Sport Sciences ===
There are 11 different indoor sports halls in the sports facility, which has an indoor area of 4110 square meters. These halls; It consists of a multi-purpose sports hall (basketball, handball, volleyball), artistic gymnasium, rhythmic gymnastics hall, badminton hall, table tennis hall, folk dance hall, billiards hall, massage hall, fitness-conditioning hall and squash hall.

There is an athletics track in compliance with IAAF standards. There is a football stadium with a seating capacity of 12527 and an indoor sports hall with a seating capacity of 5025.

=== Porsuk Sports Hall ===
Porsuk Sports Hall has 220 square meters of indoor sports area. It is a sports facility where university club teams and infrastructure volleyball activities of the Turkish Volleyball Federation are carried out.

== ESTU Media ==
=== ESTU Aktif ===
ESTÜ Aktif is an e-newspaper regularly published by Eskişehir Technical University. Instructors and students take an active role in the preparation of the newspaper. It is published regularly on the 1st and 15th of each month.

=== Radyo ESTU ===
Radyo ESTU is the radio of Eskişehir Technical University.

=== ESTU Bülten ===
ESTU Bülten is the monthly publication of Eskişehir Technical University, where it shares its studies and scientific research.

== Hasan Polatkan Airport ==
It is operated by Eskişehir Technical University. The airport was opened to traffic in 1989. It went down in history as the world's first licensed university airport with the operating license it received in 2007.

Within Hasan Polatkan Airport;

- Eskişehir Technical University flight trainings
- VIP/CIP flights
- Air taxi and ambulance flights
- Training flights of private flight schools
- Scheduled/non-scheduled domestic passenger transport flights
- Scheduled/non-scheduled international passenger transport flights

being carried out.
