= Porsuk River =

River in Turkey

Coordinates: 39°42′N 31°59′E

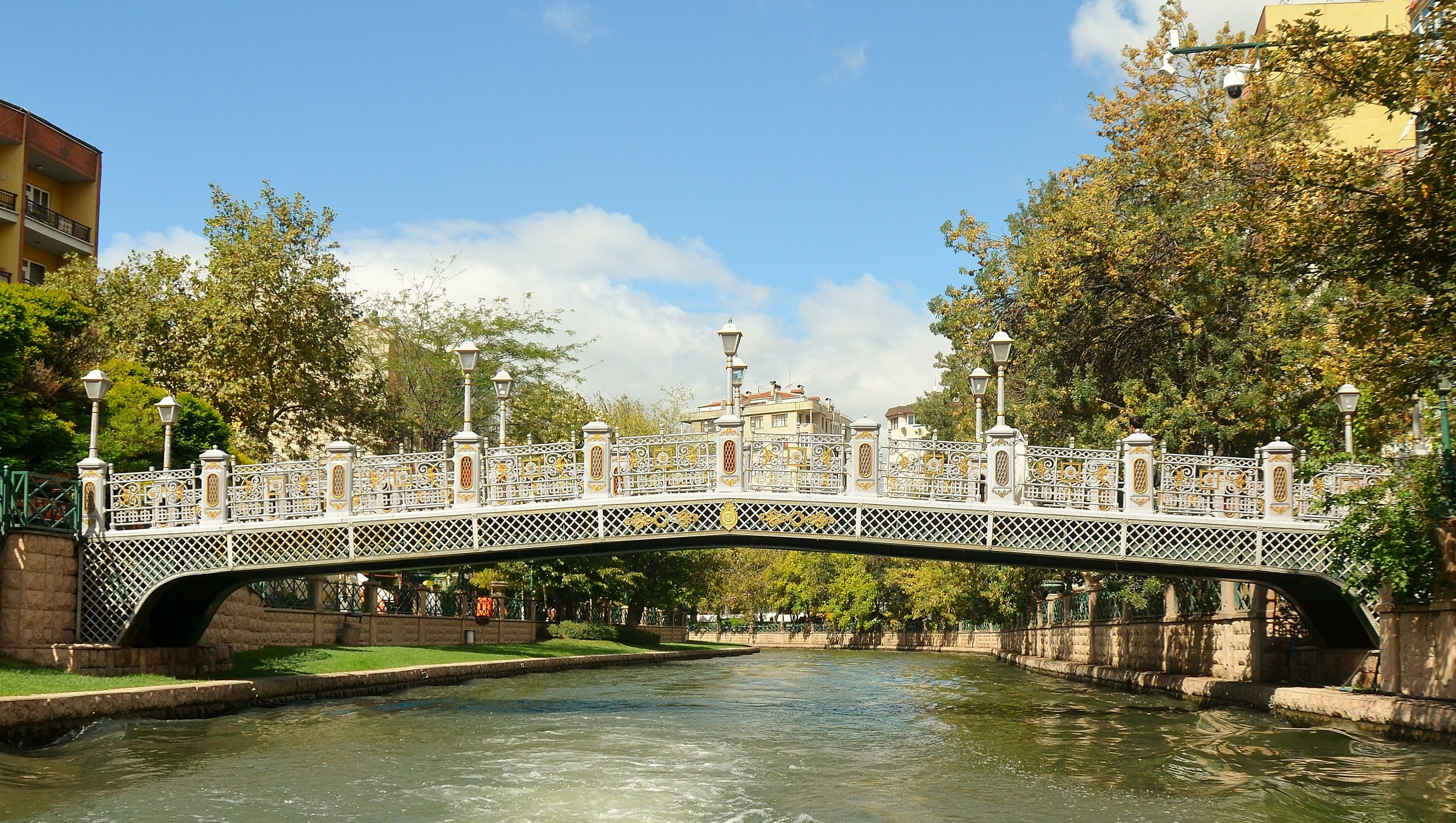
Bridge over Porsuk River in Eskişehir

The Porsuk or Kocasu-Porsuk River (Turkish: Porsuk Çayı, Kocasu-Porsuk Çayı), the ancient Tembris, is a river in Turkey, that flows for 448 km (278 mi). The city of Eskişehir is located on the banks of this river. The river is dammed by the Porsuk dam, forming large reservoirs. The Porsuk flows into the Sakarya River near the town of Polatlı, ancient Gordium.

== See also ==
- List of rivers of Turkey
