= Porsuk Dam =

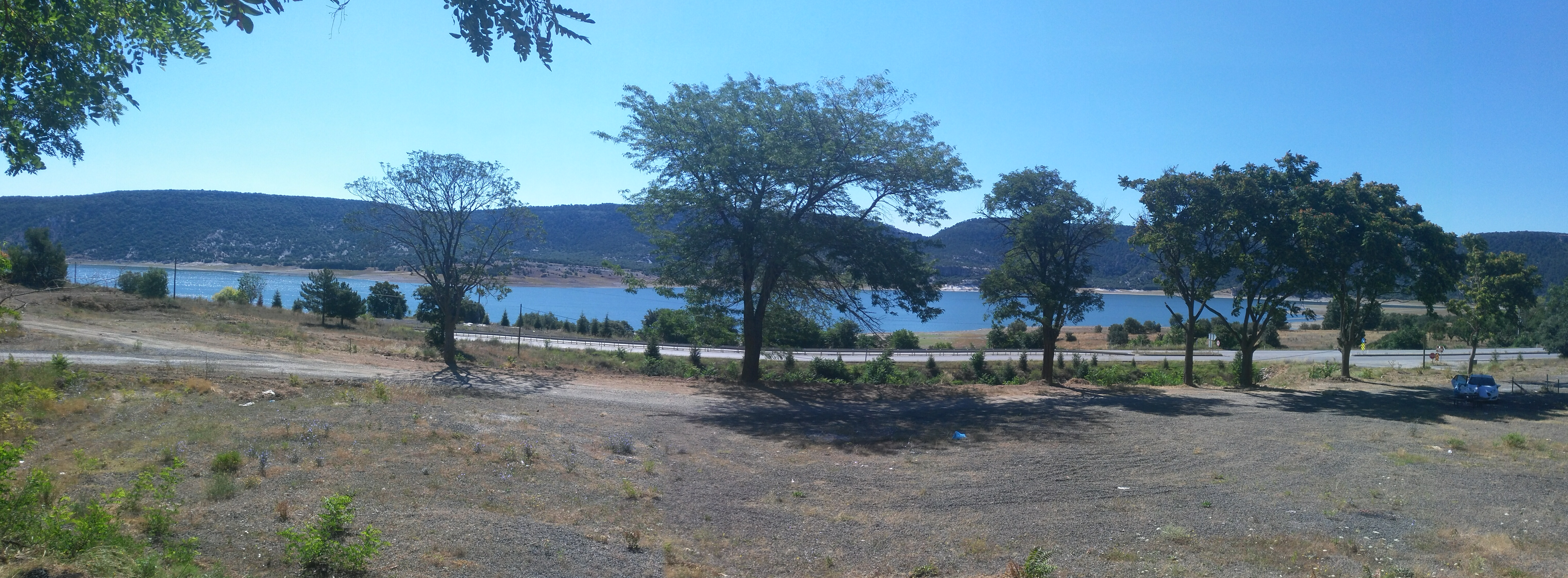

- Location within Turkey
- Location: Turkey
- Coordinates: 39.6355°N 30.2794°E
- Construction began: 1947

Dam and spillways
- Type of dam: Fill dam
- Height: 1,631 ft (497 m)
- Dam volume: 431 hm3 (431.000.000 m3)

Porsuk Dam is a dam in Turkey. The dam on the Porsuk River is located on the border of Eskişehir and Kutahya.

The development was backed by the Turkish State Hydraulic Works.

== See also ==
- List of dams and reservoirs in Turkey
