= Murusade =

Somali clan family

بنو مرسل Murusade
- Hawiye Somali Clan
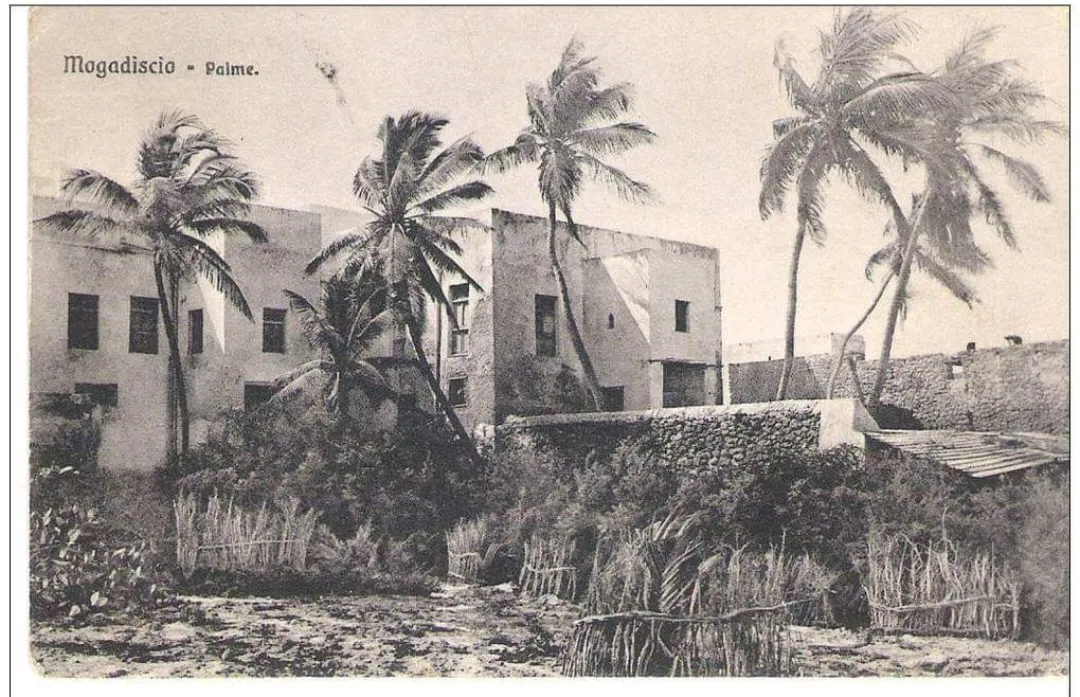
- Ethnicity: (Somalia) Somali
- Location: Somalia
- Descended From: Sheikh Ahmed Bin Abdulrahman Bin Uthman
- Parent tribe: Karanle
- Branches: Sabti: Abu Bakr Sabti; Abdalla Sabti; Idinle Sabti; Ibrahim Sabti; Foorculus: Mohamed Foorculus; Ahmed Foorculus; Ebakar Foolculus
- Language: (Somalia) Somali (Arab League) Arabic, specifically Somali Arabic
- Religion: Sunni Islam

The Murusade (Somali: Murursade, Mursal; Arabic: مرسذه ,مرسل), commonly referred to as Mursal, are a Somali sub-clan belonging to the Karanle branch of the larger Hawiye clan family. They are primarily located in central Somalia, particularly in the regions of Galgaduud, Lower Shabelle, Middle Shabelle, and the Banaadir.

Traditionally, the Mursal were nomadic pastoralists, coastal dwellers, merchants, and farmers. Historically regarded as an affluent and influential clan, they are recognized as among the earliest inhabitants of Mogadishu, the capital city of Somalia.

== Origins and etymology ==
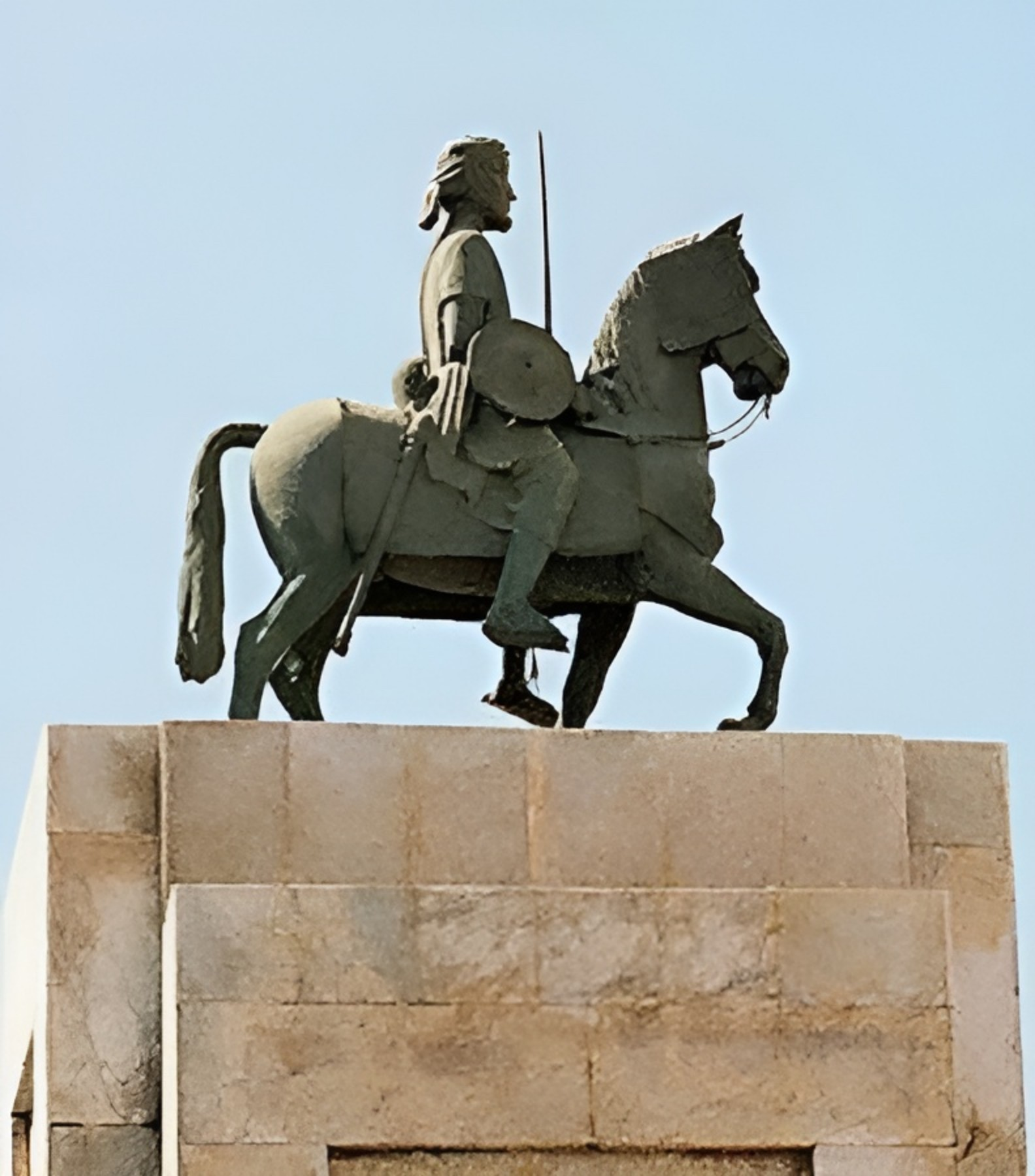
A monument of Imam Ahmad ibn Ibrahim al-Ghazi in Mogadishu, Somali Imām and General of the 'Adal Sultanate, Ruler of Harar and Conqueror of Ethiopia. Member of the Seexawle Karanle brother of Murusade.

The Murusade are a sub-clan of the Karanle branch within the larger Hawiye clan family. The Hawiye trace their lineage to Irir, one of the sons of Samaale, and the Murusade therefore maintain close genealogical ties with other Samaale-descended clans. The name Murursade means spiteful, sulking, or angry in Somali.

As part of the Karanle branch, the Murusade share ancestry with several other sub-clans, including the Gidir, Kaariye, and Sixawle. According to clan traditions, Murusade, their ancestor, was the youngest son of Karan. Tradition further holds that he shared the same mother as Sixawle and their sister Faduma, while Gidir and Kaariye were born to a different mother. Murusade, whose personal name was Mursal, was also known by the epithet Waadere Karanle, a reference to Adere, an alternative name for the city of Harar, where he was born. He had a sister named Faay. Following the death of their father, Mursal is said to have migrated northward and settled in north-central Somalia, distancing himself from other Karanle clans.

Historically, the Karanle played an important role in resisting foreign incursions into the Greater Somalia region, particularly along the contested frontiers between Somali and Abyssinian spheres of influence.

A historical description illustrates the wealth and resilience of the Karanle:

"Gum, myrrh, ostrich feathers, ivory, incense abound in Karanle; they don't grow the coffee they get from the Galla. They have camels, cattle, sheep and horses in fair quantities....They [the Karanle] alone, led by Omar-Abdi, had the courage to face the 15 thousand Amhara raiders in the Ogaden."

The Karanle are regarded as the maternal ancestors of several prominent Somali clan families, including Hiraab, the Bimal, and certain Ogaden sub-clans.

"The mother of Hirabä was Faduma Karanlä."

— Enrico Cerulli, How a Hawiye Tribe used to Live

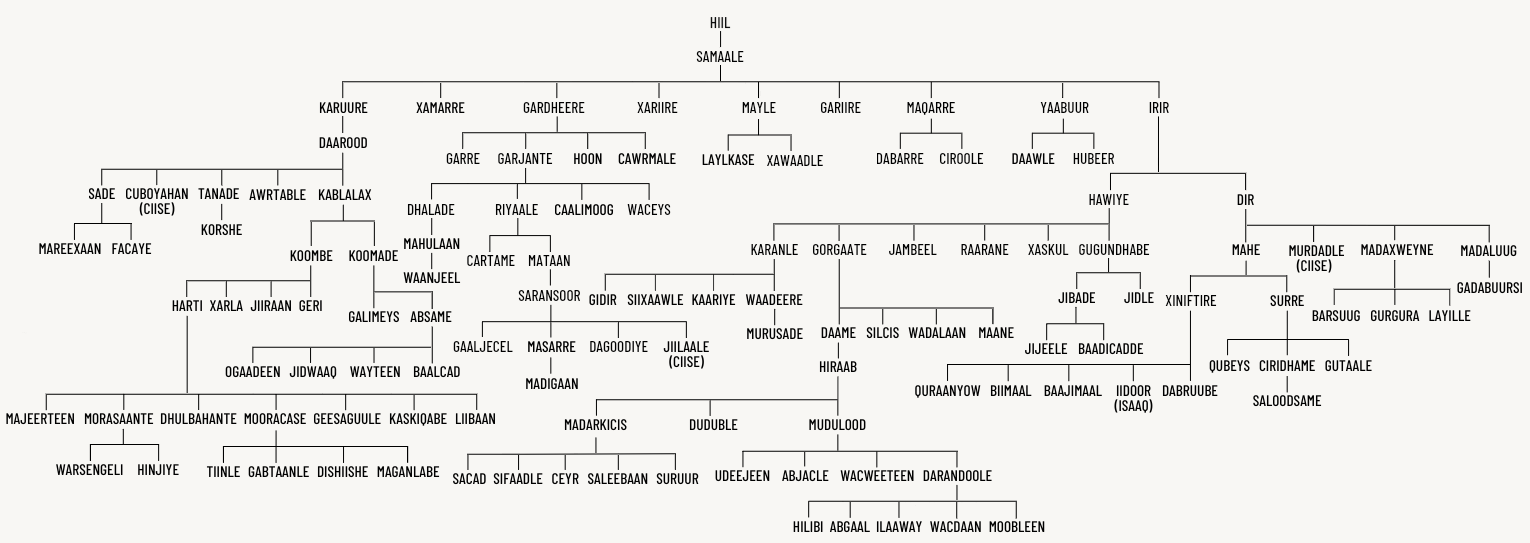
Genealogical tree of Somali clans

Originating from a background of nomadic agro-pastoralism, the Murusade have established a broad geographic presence across the central regions of Somalia. Their influence has played a notable role in the historical, political, and economic development of these areas. Of particular importance is their strong presence in the El-Buur district, a mining town with continuous habitation since at least the 13th century. El-Buur served as a significant economic center during the Ajuran Sultanate and in subsequent periods. The district was historically prized for its rich deposits of minerals and natural resources, notably sepiolite and salt, which were extensively extracted and exported. These materials held substantial cultural and economic value, being essential in the production of traditional Somali crafts such as dabqaad (also known as unsi), ceramics, and jewelry, among other artisanal goods.

In Mogadishu, the Murusade form a significant portion of the population, particularly alongside the Abgaal clan. Historically, territorial distinctions between the Murusade and Abgaal were relatively well defined. However, as Mogadishu evolved into Somalia's capital and attracted large waves of internal migration, new land tenure policies were implemented by successive governments. These reforms often led to the redistribution of land, at times compelling the Murusade to relinquish parts of their ancestral territory.

Today, the Murusade are recognized for their entrepreneurial activity, with many members engaged in commerce across Somalia. Notably, they are associated with the founding and leadership of major Somali-owned enterprises, including Hormuud Telecom.

== History ==
=== Medieval era ===
The Murusade have a commercial history that dates back along the ancient Banaadir coast and central Somalia. Throughout history, they have demonstrated a strong proclivity towards mercantilism and various forms of commerce, actively engaging in a wide array of economic pursuits. These activities ranged from nomadic pastoralism in the arid deserts of central Somalia to agricultural practices along the fertile lands surrounding the Shebelle River, including the small but documented use of slave client labor. According to the "Middle Jubba Study on Governance" published in 1999:

"The farming was performed by local client-farmers, boon, or low-status groups of the dominant Biimaal, Geledle, Hintirre, Murosade, Mobileyn, and other predominantly pastoral clans that had established control of small portions of the valley. The primary purpose of their production was at chronic shortage of farm labor left ample, fertile land uncultivated. c shortage of farm labor. In order to respond to market demands for grain in South Arabia, the local Somali clans of the Lower Shabelle began purchasing slaves from Arab and Swahili slave ships. These slaves came first from Zanzibar (the Zegua or Mushunguli people)."

Moreover, the Murusade have been actively involved in trade within bustling urban hubs and settlements located along the Banaadir coast, including the city of Mogadishu, where they were among the earliest settlers.

The Murusade Merchants had established extensive and intricate relationships with a multitude of sultanates and kingdoms situated along the Baanaadir coast, showcasing the reputation they had established over generations. This strong reputation resulted in the appointment of Murusade judges and representatives in the courts of these entities, most notably in the Ajuran Sultanate. The title of the clan was per the namesake of their genealogical ancestor, Garfuul. A famous proverb that still survives from this era says, "Garqaad Gareen Ajuuraan baa leh, Garnaqsi Garfuul Karanlaa leh."

The Murusade's inclination towards mercantilism propelled them to venture further south along the Banaadir coast, thereby granting them access to additional markets in the southern regions, particularly in bustling cities like Merca and Barawe, ultimately leading to a period of unprecedented prosperity. Southerly migration along the Banaadir coast caused the Murusade clan to become somewhat dispersed. I. M. Lewis provides a highly valuable reference to this as well as their presence along the Banaadir coast, stating:

"The Murosade, who have become detached in the process of tribal movement, are found in small groups in the region of Merca and, in a larger body, below the Shebelle around Afgoi. They are essentially pastoralists, although they practice some cultivation, and in the Merca region, they are engaged in the caravan trade."

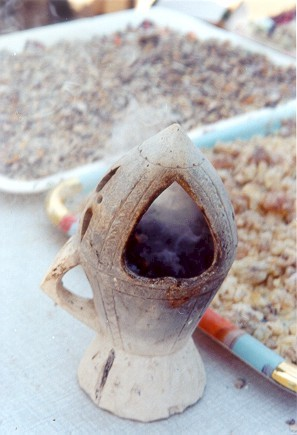
Dabqaad, a traditional stone-made incense burner mined in the country of the Murusade

The clan also maintained strong ties with their Karanle counterparts located within and surrounding the emirate of Harar, as well as its predecessor, the Ifat Sultanate and Adal Sultanate. This can be seen today in descendants of the Ethiopian Karanle subclans inhabiting southern Somalia for generations with their kinsmen – the Italian census of 1931 counts the Sihawle as a Murursade-affiliated clan inhabiting parts of Luuq district and they also can be found in small numbers in Mogadishu, while the Murursade subclan, the Muusetuur, can be found in Dire Dawa and Harar. These connections were effectively employed to ease their participation in commercial caravans originating from the northern territories. The primary purpose of these caravans was to transport and export a diverse range of locally made traditional Somali handicrafts. Among these handicrafts was the famous dabqaad, also recognized as unsi, as well as various items like incense burners, pottery, clay ovens, and jewellery, among a plethora of other traditional Somali handicrafts. These products were procured from El-Buur, a notable Murusade settlement, which served as the clan's main trading hub in central and northern Somalia. It was from this hub that they obtained significant quantities of economically valuable minerals such as sepiolite, quartz, muscovite, microcline, and goethite, in addition to other commodities like livestock, Ivory, Sorghum, Ghee, Salt, Hides, and Gold among others.

==== Banaadir Coast ====
As the Murusade clan expanded in size, they initiated a migration away from their traditional territory located in the northern-central region of Somalia, moving towards the southern regions in the company of other Hawiye clans. The Hawiye, to which the Murusade belong, hold the distinction of being the earliest Somali clan to be documented in historical records. The historical accounts trace their presence back to the 12th century, portraying them as a significant Muslim community that resided in the area ranging from Merca to Ras Hafun, encompassing the fertile lands along the "Nile of Mogadishu," known as the Webi Shebelle. Subsequent writings by Arab scholars further reinforce the prominence of the Hawiye clan, linking them to key locations such as Merca and the lower Shabelle valley. Of particular note is Merca, which is specifically identified as the "capital of Hawiye country," boasting a multitude of more than 50 settlements within its boundaries. The historical trajectory of the Murusade clan's migration aligns with the broader movement of the Hawiye clans, underscoring their shared history and cultural heritage. This journey signifies not only a physical relocation but also a symbolic continuation of the legacy and influence of the Hawiye clan across different regions of Somalia.

"Since sections of the Hawiyya were migrating southward before and during Ahmed's jihad, it is not inconceivable that they brought certain theocratic notions with them. Indeed, the Ajuran maintained a wakil (governor) in the region around Qallafo. This area was not only the traditional Hawiyya homeland, but also stood midway geographically between the emirates of Harar and the Benaadir, an ideal link for the transmission of political and religious ideas."

===== Mogadishu =====
Mogadishu has a rich historical background that stretches back centuries. It served as the capital of the Sultanate of Mogadishu from the 9th to the 13th century, controlling the trade from Somalia to the Indian Ocean. Subsequently, it came under the rule of the Ajuran Sultanate in the 13th century, a significant player in the maritime trade along the medieval Silk Road. The Murusade clan in agreement with others, argues to be one of the original inhabitants of Mogadishu, having settled there sometime over a millennium ago.

According to Sheikh Mahamed Ahmed Sheikh Mahamud, a Banaadiri theologian and scholar of Banaadiri history:

"Some of the earliest Somalis from the interior to interact with the Xamari were the Abgal-Reer Mataan, except the Yaquub of the Harti, who settled in Shingani. Additionally, the Is-Xijwaq settled at Gubta. Later, the Muse Abkood, Habar Ceyno, and Hillabi Mohamed from the Murasade (Hawiye) also arrived. These Hawiye groups were collectively referred to as the Xamar Daye, while the Xamari identified themselves as such."

Ishijwaaq, Muse Abkood, Habar Ceyno, and Hilibi Mohammed are all sub-clans of the Murusade clan. At a certain point in Mogadishu's history, elders from different factions gathered to address the rising behavioral issues in the community. This led to the establishment of cooperatives, known as iskaashatooyin. It was also decided that the town would be divided into four zones or quarters, with residents being collectively known by the name of their respective zone. Dhabar Weyne, one of these zones located near the coast, was predominantly inhabited by members of the Murusade clan. During their time there, this clan played a vital role in the city's economy by forming alliances with various clans and participating in commercial activities. Positioned strategically at the port of Xamar, they took advantage of access to lucrative markets in the Arabian Peninsula, thereby contributing to the city's economic growth. The Murusade, alongside the Yaquub, are also listed as long-time native inhabitants, and a stand-alone (non-confederacy) in the ancient Mogadishu districts of Shingani, Hamarweyne, and Hamar Jajab in the earliest Italian census takes of Mogadishu at the turn of the 20th century.

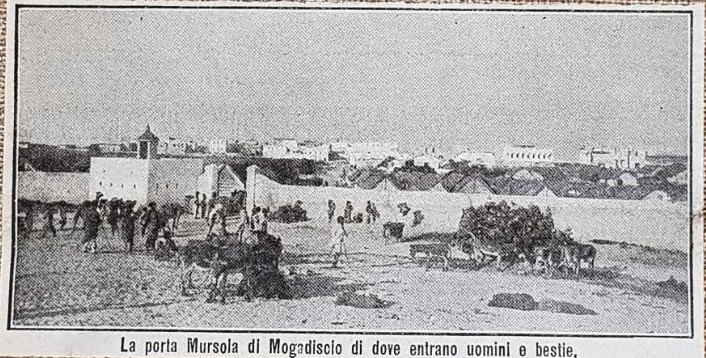
The Murusade gate of the old city of Mogadishu.

Their impact on the city was profound, as indicated by the symbolic gesture of dedicating one of the four original gateways of the ancient city in their honor. Accounts of Mogadishu's gate by Italian colonial officer Giuseppe Stefanini in May 1913:

"A wall surrounds all the city and opens itself to the outside through four doors [gates]: one towards the sea on the north east side going to Itala and Obbia [Adala and Hobbiyo]; the Gardens door [possibly near the Arba‟- Rukun mosque and garden]; the Market door, from which are the roads leading to the interior and, particularly, to Afgoi, the Scidle and the Dafet [Afgooye, Jowhar and Dafet]; and finally, the Mursola door to the south, leading towards Gesira, Merca and Brava [Jesira, Marka and Baraawe]"

===== Merca =====
Murusade mostly operated outside confederacies and engaged in the caravan trade in the Benadir coastal cities and towns like Bulo Mareer and Merca, some small subclans like the Ibrahim Sabti also migrated there and created aliases like the Shukeerere, a group identified as traders along the Banaadir coast, with significant populations in Merca, where they held a prominent position as one of the 12 Koofid. The term "Koofi" denotes a hat and is symbolic of the 12 elders or clan leaders who serve as representatives of the Merca community. Furthermore, the Shukeerere community had a presence in other Banaadir towns like Mogadishu, where they predominantly resided in the Morshe cooperative.

==== Ajuran Sultanate ====
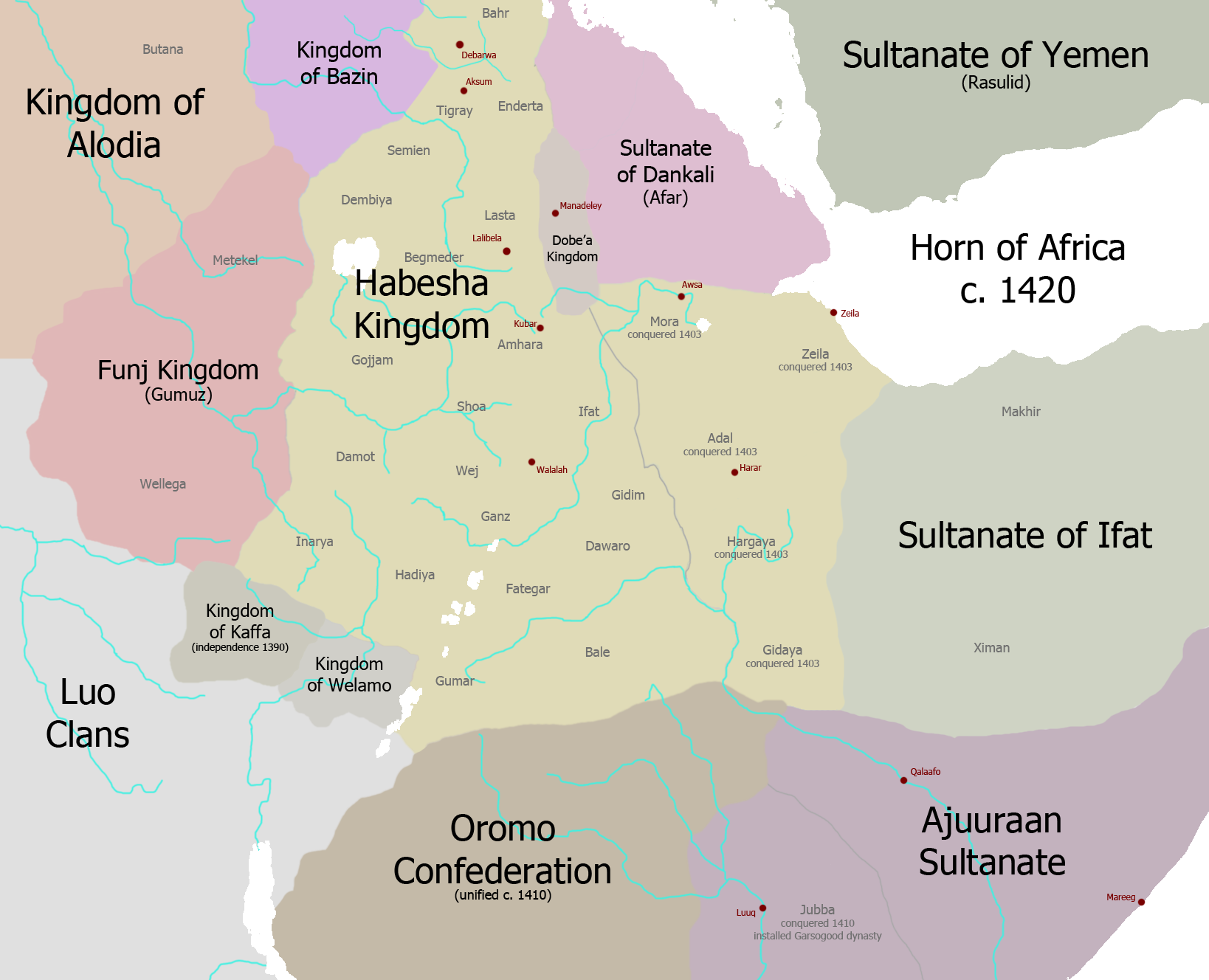
Map of the Horn Of Africa in 1430 showing the Ajuran Sultanate

In the years leading to the 13th century, the Hawiye clan, including the Murusade, found themselves under the leadership of the Ajuuran Sultanate, which was led by the Ajuran (clan), another Hawiye subclan of the Garen Jambelle Hawiye clan family and instrumental in establishing the Ajuuran Sultanate, a powerful entity that held sway over vast territories encompassing much of southern Somalia and parts of eastern Ethiopia. This sultanate's reach extended from the northern town of Hobyo to the western region of Qelafo, and farther down to the southern city of Kismayo. To solidify their control and authority, the Ajuran rulers strategically leveraged a network of Hawiye clans, including the Murusade, relying on their support to maintain Ajuuran supremacy across the land. Notably, it was during the reign of the Ajuuran Sultanate that the Murusade town of El-Buur flourished and emerged as a significant local trading center. Enrico Cerulli states:

"In historical terms, a theocratic ideology superimposed on an extensive network of Hawiyya-affiliated clans helped uphold Ajuran dominance over a wide region."

The Ajuran Sultanate collapsed in the 17th century primarily due to their implementation of excessive taxes on their populace, which led to the Hawiye initiating a rebellion and defeating the Ajuran Sultanate. Subsequently, the Hawiye became key figures in a new influx of Somali migrants, who were in search of safety and new opportunities elsewhere.

The Ajuran returned back to Ethiopia to rejoin older Ajuran lineages as well as the Karanle, demonstrating the long ties between both clans despite the turbulent history, intermarriage, and political alliances in the face of Oromo and Ethiopian incursions persisted.

The Somali race of Neciasciar (a village in central Oromia) is represented by the Gurra, with few Hauia elements. The Caranle and the Agiuran, who immigrated there 30 years ago and who have a considerable influence on the social life of the Arsi; the Caranle especially came there to Islamize them, but ended up merging with them in a process of mutual assimilation, causing the Arsi to lose their religious heritage. It is therefore the work of the Caranle that today the Arsi of Neciasciar are Muslims, a modest minority is still pagan, but everything suggests that this is disappearing to embrace Islamism.

==== Hiraab Imamate ====
Within this successor group of migrants were the Murusade, who traveled southwards alongside the Hiraab clan, who would go on to establish the Hiraab Imamate as a successor to the now defunct Ajuran Sultanate. The long standing relationship between the Hiraab and the Murusade, dating back to the foundations of Hawiye, prospered during this initial era. Key subclans of the Yaquub were born to women of the Murusade clan. The Murusade played a key role in defeating the Ajuran along the Shabelle River. I.M Lewis states:

"The Ajuran influence was considerable and the pressure which they exerted to the south-east contributed to the collapse of the Muzaffar dynasty of Mogadishu. Other tribes of the Hawiya family now began to appear in the south. The Herab and Murosade defeated the Ajuran and settled along the Shebelle."

According to Roland Marchal in his 1997 Studies On Governance, commenting on the established Murursade sections of the Benadir region and Mogadishu city:

"Historically, the Murusade community, like in other districts of the region, was part of the Hiraab. The situation had changed by the beginning of this century when the Hiraab denomination shifted to Hawiye, maybe because of the number of Hawiye (though non- Hiraab) settling in the region."

==== Geledi Sultanate ====
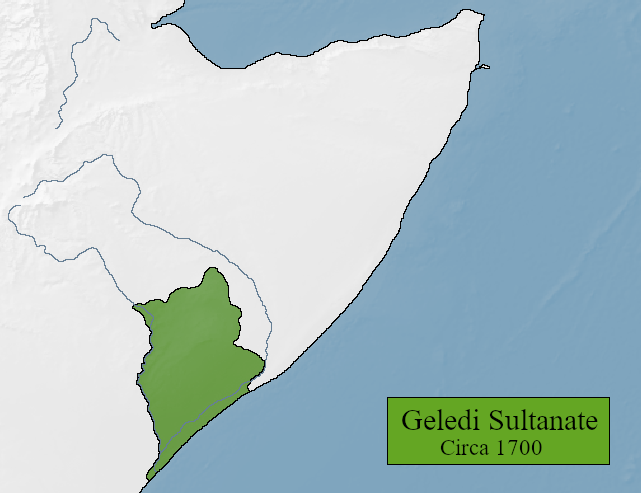
Geledi Sultanate. Circa 1700

Following the collapse of the Ajuuran Sultanate and the subsequent migrations of the Hawiye in the lower Shabelle region, this particular era witnessed a significant increase in inter-Hawiye conflicts that were predominantly fought along clan divisions. The Murusade clan found themselves embroiled in the midst of this turmoil, engaging in numerous battles to secure power and territory within the Shebelle region, particularly facing off against the Mudulood sub-clan of the Hawiye clan. Moreover, the Murusade were also involved in clashes with the Galla residing on the upper banks of the Jubba River during this period, leading to a significant incursion across the river in close proximity to the city of Sindassi near Barawa. Subsequently, the Murusade made the decision to migrate towards the northern regions, where a majority of their skirmishes against the Mudulood sub-clan took place, further intensifying the conflicts in the area. This series of events during the time period following the Ajuuran collapse underscores the intricate web of power struggles, territorial disputes, and inter-ethnic confrontations that characterized the historical landscape of the lower Shabelle region. Colucci states;

"Among the Garanle tribes, only the Uadaris were included within the ancient borders of the Benadir Colony, especially represented by the Murisada or Mursola, bordering the Obbia region and the middle Shabelle. According to Colucci, a compact group occupies the villages of Demeràle, Gumurei and Màgle: originally they were in Torre and Sindassi (Brava), but defeated by the Galla, they emigrated to the north. They fought against the Hauìa Uadan and they defeated them six times, but they were then defeated and had to retreat to Balad, where, encountering with other Hauìa, the Mobilèn, succeeded well three times to beat them, but then suffered from them too a defeat and they fell back on Gheledi, welcomed as alifa by Sultan Jusuf Mahmud and occupied the lands where they still are today. To the Garanle tribe the Murisadas also belong, descended, to what they claim, from Northern Somalia to right bank of the Shebelle, south of the Mobilèn. "

The Murusade were welcomed as 'Halifa' or allies by the Sultanate of Geledi, led by Sultan Yusuf Mahamud Ibrahim, who was looking to form partnerships to counter neighboring clans like the Wa'daan, the Hubeer and the Biimaal. By the close of the 17th century, the Ajuran Sultanate was experiencing a decline, causing various vassals to either gain independence or become part of emerging Somali powers. One of these emerging powers was the Silcis Sultanate, which started to assert its authority over the Afgooye region. Initially vassals, the Geledi and the Wa'adan rebelled against and expelled the Silcis by the turn of the 18th century. Subsequently, the two clans established an alliance, later joined by the Murusade, who were granted land in the northeast of the Geledi Sultanate, including Afgooye, where they founded parts of the town quarters and its important offices. They also founded several other towns, taking Jareer groups as clients in order to farm the fields along the banks of the river. The Murusade fought heavily in the Geledi Conquest of Bardere in 1843, defeating the Jamaa'at in order to restore the ivory trade station inside its citadel that connected routes to Barawe. These three clans, collectively known as Geledi, formed a unified social and political entity over the following centuries, culminating in conflicts with the Italians. The primary factions within this coalition, namely the Murusade and the Wa'adan, were deemed crucial allies. Despite being part of the Geledi Sultanate, they maintained their distinct identities, engaging in the exchange of bloodwealth and other legal compensations as a united polity. They were, however, regarded as equals by the Geledi, who sought their counsel prior to making decisions.

"From time to time a general assembly, kulun, of the entire Geledi clan, was held. Such an assembly would be ordered by the sultan; any man could come who wished, but it was necessary that all the lineages should be represented....There was an attempt to hold a general kulun at the election of 1964, to choose whom the clan would elect as deputy. The sultan refused to ratify it unless the Wa'adan and Murusade were also called."

=== Early modern period ===
==== Battles against the Portuguese ====
The Murusade, as one of the principal clans of the Banadir coast, engaged in conflicts with the Portuguese empire, which aimed to dominate trade routes along the east African coast and the Red Sea. Mentions of the clan group are found in Portuguese references dating back to the 16th century.

At the time, the Murusade resided near Barawa, Sindassi, Torre, and Barawe, and aligned themselves with the Ajuran to resist the Portuguese forces.

The Murusade are also noted to have participated in attacks against the city of Barawa during this time.

"Historically, the case of Brava is closer to that of Merka, where the Zanzibarite Arabs of the city formed an alliance with the Tunni, a Digil clan, to repel the assaults of the Hawiye communities in the hinterland, the Abgal, the Murosade and the Wadan. Brava was the object of many of these battles and was successfully coveted by the Portuguese (in the 17th century), the Omanis (in the 17th century), the Egyptians (in 1875) and the Italians (in 1885), each one forming roots."

==== Italian Somaliland ====
The Murusade are one of the principal clans of the ancient Banaadir coast, also declared as the "Benadir Colony" by the Italians when they arrived, and it span from Mudug to Jubaland. Due to this, despite the fact that the Sultan of the clan, Mudei Hassan of the Hilibi sub-clan, had officially signed a protectorate agreement with the Italians, On December 27, 1894, in Mogadishu, certain branches of the clan residing in some of the southern areas, which were significantly distanced from the direct authority of the Sultan and the clan elders, persisted in engaging in conflicts against the Italian forces. This was particularly evident in the case of branches that had established strategic alliances with the aforementioned Geledi Sultanate, thereby strengthening their resistance efforts. The alliance formed by the Geledi, Wa'adan, and Murusade factions emerged as a pivotal and influential force that actively opposed the Italian presence in the region.

===== Battle of Lafoole =====
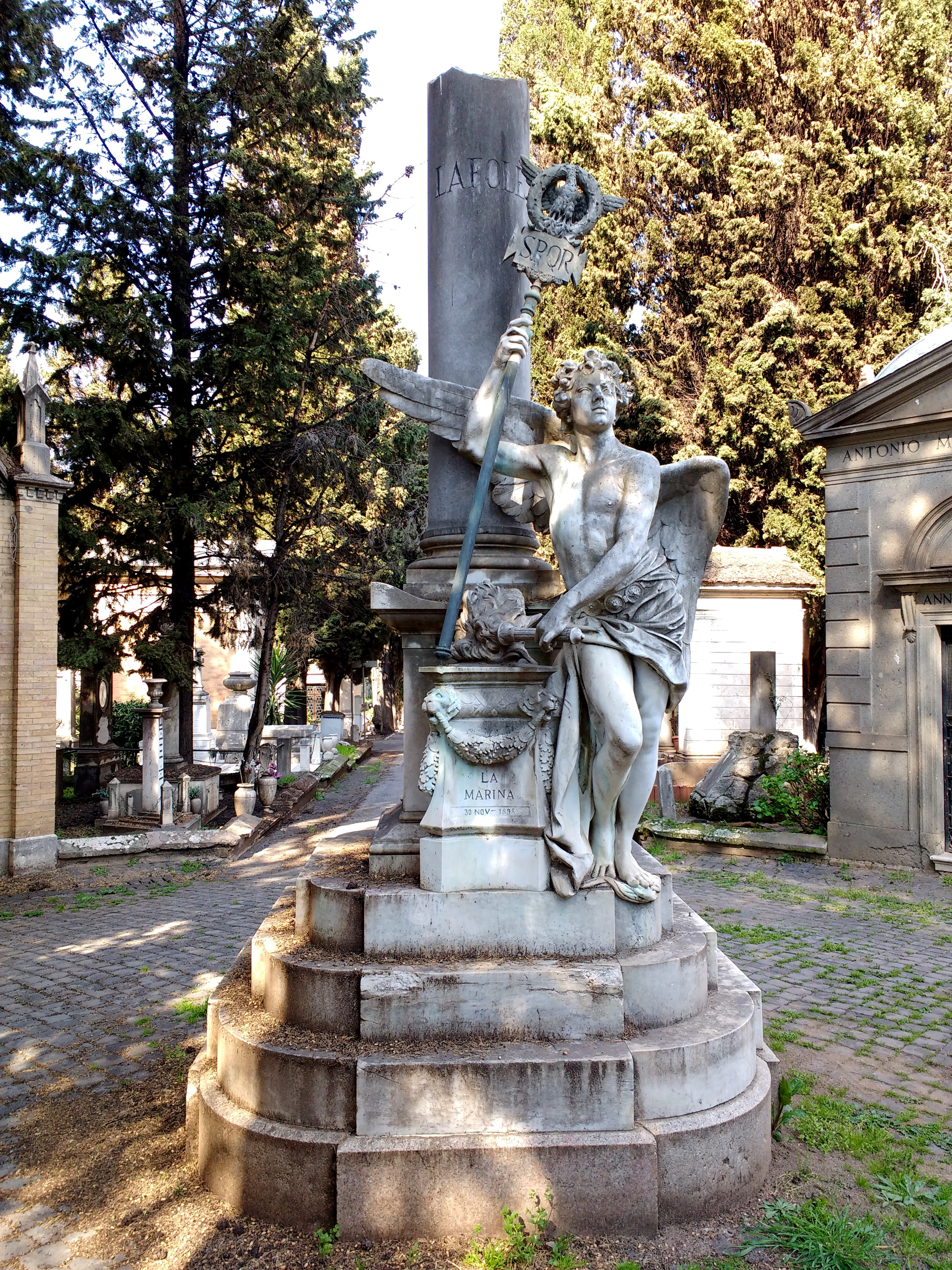
Memorial to the fallen Italian soldiers at Lafoole

On November 25, 1896, the Italian government authorized an expedition to explore the inland areas. This authorization was eagerly anticipated by Cecchi, the main architect of Italian colonialism in Africa, serving the Governor General of the overall colonial mission, who was determined to finalize agreements with the influential Sultan of Geledi, whom he believed to be pivotal to Italy's plans for Somalia. However, it became apparent that the Sultan did not accurately represent the sentiments of the local population, who vehemently opposed Italian expansion in the region. After establishing their camp at Lafoole in the evening, the expedition group was unexpectedly ambushed, leading to a fierce confrontation. Despite this initial attack, it did not definitively halt the progress of the expedition. The following morning, a renewed and more intense assault took place, ultimately resulting in the decisive defeat of the Italian expedition, with only three survivors left to recount the harrowing defeat that they suffered including the death of Cecchi, mourned in Italy. Lee V. Cassanelli states:

"Geledi’s long-time allies the Wa'adan had apparently acted independently at Lafoole; and they had been assisted by a handful of warriors from the Murursade"

Following the humiliating defeat of the Italian forces, commonly referred to as the 'Lafoole Massacre', 'Axad Shiikhi' (the Year of Cecchi) in local accounts and "Adwa Part Two" in the Italian media - referring to the similar Italian defeat suffered in Ethiopia months prior at the hands of Menelik, also considered the first premodern victory of colored natives over a white army, a subsequent series of retaliatory actions took place. Approximately five months after the Lafoole incident, Sorrentino, supported by reinforcements from two Eritrean companies, led an aggressive response against the Murusade and other tribes associated with the defeat at Lafoole. This retribution involved the destruction of Lafoole, the bombardment of the coastal village of Nimow from the sea, and subsequent assaults on several other villages connected to the Geledi and Murusade clans. The aftermath of these events significantly impacted Italian colonial ambitions, influencing both their morale and strategic objectives.

"It was the first colonial attempt to penetrate the interior with a military contingent, and it ended disastrously for the Italians. "

As a consequence of the Lafole war and the decades-long Italian incursions into the Shabelle saw El Buur (a demonym for a large Italian centre for areas up to and including parts of Dusamareb and ElDheer) forming the first and largest district under the Webi Shebeli Regional Commission of the Benadir Colony since 1889, border groups of the Murusade also came into contact with the dervishes and the Hobyo Sultanate, allying with the former and opposing the latter.

Members of the Bimal, Geledi, Hintera, Murosade and Abgal clans made the trek to the Nogal, the travellers were provided with some 80 guns and a message of encouragement to be given to Haji Abdi Abikar Gafle.

The contact between the Mullist cause and the dissenting Bimal leaders and other Benadir clans more hostile to us worried not only the Italian colonial authorities, given that the possibility of an alliance in that direction would have inflamed the northern border of the Benadir colony, whose instability was also caused by the numerous clashes between the subjects of Obbia and the Habr Ghidr, Uasle and the Mursala. In this regard, Cerrina Feroni spared no harsh words on the work of the regent Cappello on the occasion of his last mission on the southern Somali coast, judged "unsatisfactory" and indeed such as to accutisize all existing disputes.

The Murusade, in conjunction with a coalition formed by various clans, would go on to thwart Italian advancements into the inland areas of the inter-riverine region, effectively maintaining a line of defense for over two decades.

=== Modern period ===
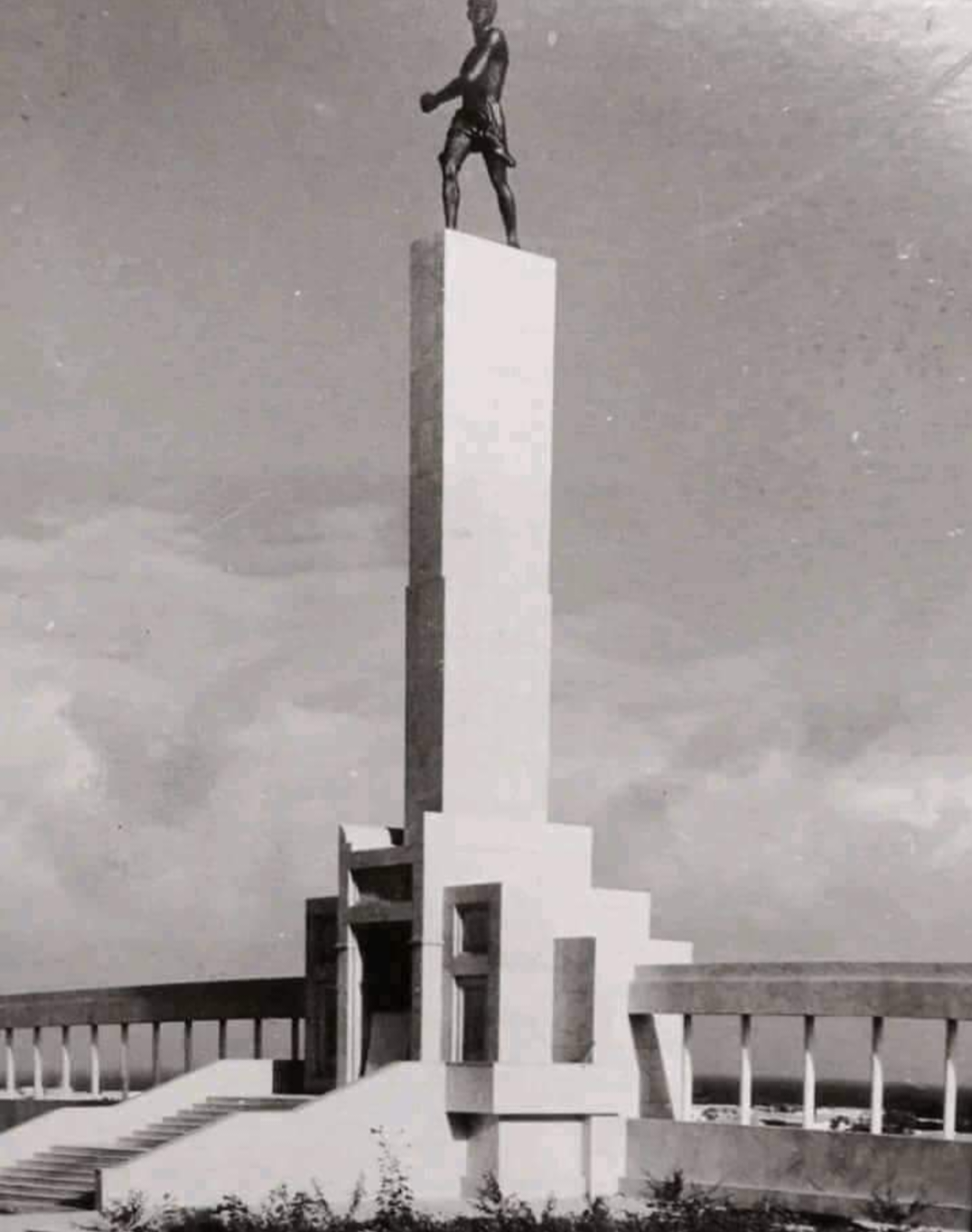
Dhagaxtuur Monument (1949)

==== Somali Republic ====
In 1949, following the conclusion of the British military administration, Italian Somaliland transitioned into a United Nations trusteeship named the Trust Territory of Somaliland under Italian administration.

This trusteeship lasted for a decade, spanning from 1950 to 1960, during which legislative elections occurred in 1956 and 1959. In May 1954, local elections took place in the Trust Territory of Somaliland to select representatives for 35 municipalities. The Murusade community overwhelmingly backed the Somali Youth League, although some individuals were influenced by the SAU, who exploited the discord between the Murusade, Abgaal and the Habar Gidir-Saleeban, with the Habar Gidir-Sa'ad.

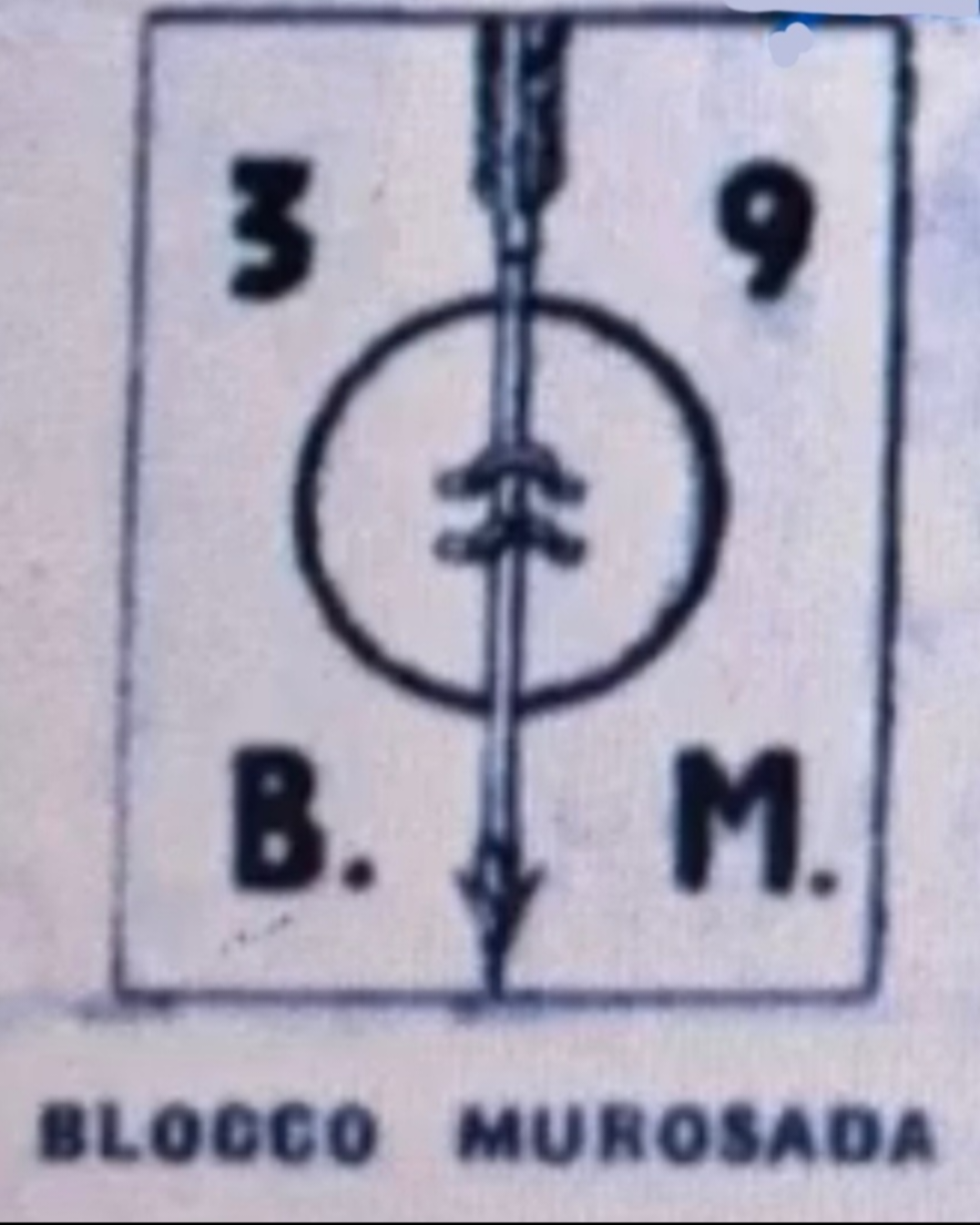
Local Murusade bloc political party from 1954-1969 with the clan's traditional alias 3&9

Additionally, following the return of Italy to manage Somalia in 1950 leading to the proliferation of clan-based interests in the political scene, the Murusade established a local clan party, known as the "Blocco Murusada" (the Murusade bloc), a party that participated in Municipal elections and secured some electoral support. It would go on to last until the last elections of 1969, participating in the elections of March that year and headquartered in Gubta.

=== Somali Rebellion (1986-1991) ===
Following the Ogaden war in 1977, the popularity of Somalia's president Mohammed Siad Barre began to diminish, leading to widespread discontent among his generals which resulted in an attempted coup d'état on April 10, 1978, led by Colonel Mohamed Osman Irro and 16 other men including one Murusade. In an attempt to retain his authority, Barre's administration started to exhibit increasingly totalitarian tendencies. Initially, the Murusade clan showed support for Barre's government due to the privileges they enjoyed, enabling their businesses to flourish and making the clan wealthier. The Murusade clan was described as privileged during this period. The Murusade clan had a significant influence in key economic sectors, with a near monopoly over the country's fourth largest export. However, towards the end of the 1980s, the relationship between the Murusade clan and Barre deteriorated due to heightened totalitarian violence by Barre's regime against the Somali people.

At this critical juncture, Barre, apprehensive of a potential uprising from the Murusade clan, resorted to issuing threats in order to maintain control over them.

"the Murusade and the Majeerteen clan members, ambitious as they were, deemed a danger to the security and safety of Siad Barre and had to be dispersed once and for all."

Barre had started with targeting wealthy Murusade businessmen operating in Kenya right under the nose of President Daniel Arap Moi, a then-friend of Barre, who wished to see his Somali rivals extradited or deported, causing some businessmen to relocate to Uganda or hide in the countryside of Northeastern Kenya and back into Somalia or Ethiopia.

"Harassment and deportations of Somali businessmen had been occurring months before the screening, particularly targeting the Habr Gedir and Murusade clans of the Hawiye clan family as well as the Isaaq and Harti clan families. Businessmen were targeted for a number of reasons. As the screening continued, it became a tool for rivals seeking to settle disputes; there were rumours that the screening ended in part because it was threatening those close to the Kenyan Somali politicians in the office of the President."

Another incident took place in July 1989, wherein Barre dispatched notable Murusade businessmen to Hargeisa to witness the devastation he had inflicted upon its residents, serving as a thinly disguised warning to deter the Murusade from further challenging his authority.

"In Mogadishu, the regime did not spare Isaaqs. On 15 July 1989, 47 Isaaq civilians in Mogadishu were taken from their homes to Jazira Beach west of the city and were summarily executed. 159 The execution was reportedly well- planned. For instance, after the regime's genocidal act against the Isaaq people Barre sent leading Hawiye businessmen to Hargeisa to observe its destruction, thereafter, reminding the Abgal and Murusade traders that Mogadishu was their goof [private land] and armed opposition against his regime meant that he was ready to destroy Mogadishu as well."

Despite the threats, by the late 1980s, the Murusade clan altered their position and aligned with the opposition. Ali Mohammed Osoble, known as Ali Wardhigley, a member of the Murusade clan, former commissioner MP for Mogadishu and the only anti-Barre figure in Somalia since the first day of the October Revolution to not work under his auspices, Wardhigleh served on the committees of SODAF, SSDF and was later appointee of the Vice-Chairman of the SNM from 1984 to 1987. Subsequently, he founded the United Somali Congress in Rome on January 7, 1989, in response to severe actions taken against the Hawiye clan by the government of Mohamed Siad Barre. In 1989 at the house of Ali Geedi Shadoor, a former member of the last civilian parliament, the USC deliberated and reached an agreement to divide power among the Hawiye clans. The Murusade were to be responsible for foreign affairs. Between 1989 until his eventual ouster in 1991, President Barre initiated extensive crackdowns and used force against the Hawiye in their regions in Southern and Central Somalia.

==== Civil war ====
In January 1991, USC rebels emerged victorious over the Red Berets, who were Barre's specialized forces, resulting in the collapse of Barre's control over the government. Despite this triumph, the USC was unsuccessful in negotiating a political agreement with other rebel factions such as the SNM, SPM, and the SSDF. Additionally, internal divisions arose within the USC leadership when Ali Mahdi Muhammad was appointed interim President. Subsequently, the USC faction divided into two rival groups within the Hawiye clan, one led by Mahdi, supported by the Abgaals, and the other by Aideed, supported by the Habar Gidir. The USC originally agreed to grant the Murusade control over the seaport, with their hired clan militia band known as "Ashaamud". Other USC clans took possession of the airport, Villa Somalia, and the city's entry zones.

Although the Murusade initially remained neutral during the first couple of months of the conflict, the clan acted as guarantors for non-Hawiye politicians in Ali Mahdi's newly declared government in Hotel Weheliye, guarded with tanks according to Abdi Farah Juha's interview with senators from Puntland, however not long after, a section of the Murusade in Mogadishu were drawn into the conflict following a sudden assault or ambush by Aideed's forces on the green line area dividing the SNA and the SSA zones, an area dominated by the Murusade in January 1992, resulting in the loss of numerous innocent lives, looted assets and properties. According to Robert Oakley, the last US Ambassador to Somalia, the Murusade who inhabited the green line and elsewhere in the town, suffered heavily from shelling directed from the Abgaal and the Habr Gedir at each other on either sides of the line. The Habar Gidir Militia, following Aideed, who accused the Murusade of arming the Abgaal, discovered substantial amounts of money hidden in boxes and cartons within Murusade businesses, prompting them and other Somali clans to adopt the pejorative tribal slang 'Kuwaiti' to refer to the Murusade in reference to the affluent Gulf nation attacked for their oil during the Gulf War a few years prior. A famous shirib that quotes this incident is recited "Maal jeclaa oo maar necebaa ma Kuwayd baa".

Following the attacks, the Murusade clan entered the war in a prolonged tit-for-tat with Aideed's SNA, targeting his compounds and bases until 1994 before politically aligning closer with Mahdi. However, later disagreements with the Abgaal, lead to confrontations between the two clans in October 1994. Hostilities in a number of locations continued sporadically into September 1995 spilling into the famous Bermuda central district of Mogadishu, an ungovernable and distinct area of the city outside the realms of Mahdi and Aidid, in which the Abgaal and Murusade frequently tussled and fought over despite the unity prior to this under the command of Colonel Ismail Yassin (the Habr Eno Militia leader) to successfully prevent Aideed's allied SNA incursions into Bermuda, strategically located at the heart of the city overseeing the seaport and airport. The Abgaal fighting the Murusade was eventually settled in 1995 when the two clans brokered a peace agreement. This was also immortalised in the documentary film "Bermuda Road Warriors of Mogadishu" aired on TV in the 1990s.

Though numerous ceasefires and settlement negotiations of returned properties took place between the Abgaal, Hawadle, Habr Gedir and Murusade from 1992 to 1995, the interference of the UN/US peacekeeping mission jockeying between the clans' political and territorial disputes forced the Murusade to regularly retaliate in their own fashion, shooting at their rivals commercial ships approaching Mogadishu Port in order to keep prices artificially high for the food that was in the market, they also blocked convoys going from Mogadishu to contested areas.

However, the Murusade were excluded from a March 1992 UN ceasefire, which led to much discontent within the clan. As a measure of retaliation against the United Nations, who had negotiated the ceasefire, the Murusade militia forced the first UN ship that tried to land in Mogadishu back to Mombasa.

Long time Horn of African analyst Matt Bryden, echoes a similar sentiment commenting on the Mogadishu Civil War, "The Murosade are central to the Muqdisho problem and there is no solution possible without them. The Murosade remain a vital third force in Muqdisho, whose mass has the potential to shift the political and military balance one way or another".

Other isolated conflicts surrounding the El Bur and El Dher districts of Galgaduud had also occurred sporadically in this period with the clan defending its territories against their mainly Hawiye neighbours of the Habr Gedir, Abgaal, Hawadle and Duduble.

=== Post-civil war ===
Since 2000 at the start of the 21st century when Somalia slowly began to recover with the establishment of transitional institutions and governing systems supported by Djibouti, the Murusade had maintained some degree of prominence in the differing fields of all things Somali. Abdulkadir Yahya Ali, a well-loved peacemaker from this clan was instrumental in establishing the Centre for Dialogue and Research (CRD), a think tank that saw workshops focusing on peace, development, and NGO activity. The archaic warlords of the 90s had simmered down following the death of Aideed, with his one-time comrade Mohamed Qanyare Afrah who defected to the SNA to become Aidid's deputy in 1994 before embarking on a major trajectory, serving not only as the last chairman of the USC but also led the warlord alliance under the names of G8 and the Alliance for the Restoration of Peace and Counter-Terrorism (ARPCT). Qanyare negotiated governing frameworks with then President Abdiqasim Salad Hassan, with a fruitful succession of governments elected till today. Following the rise of the Islamic Courts Union however, some lineages of the Murusade, radicalised by the events that saw the dissolution of the ICU at the hands of the United States and Ethiopia, particularly in the central regions, have kept a long allegiance with Al-Shabaab, in opposition to Ethiopia, AMISOM and the rival Sufi paramilitary self-titled the Ahlu Sunna Waljama'a.

Though not currently backed with high level state regional interests, the Murusade are prominent in Banaadir politics with members in Galmudug, South West State and Hirshabelle. The Murusade politicians are also a regular feature in the presidential elections, having participated from 2004 to 2026 with a position in the top four candidates.

== Leaders and traditions ==
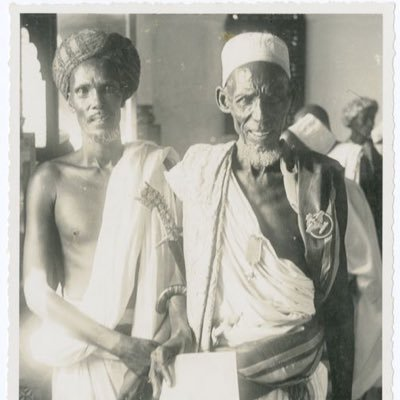
Capo Mahadalle Yarow of the Hilivi section of Murusade in Mogadishu 1939 with his son

Current Sultan (Habar Maxamed): Sultan Haji Hassan Ahmed Sabriye "Gardheer"

Current Ughaz (Habar Cayno): Ugaas Abdullahi Ugaas Haashi Ugaas Faracadde

Current Isloow (Habar Idinle): Islow Socdaal Islow Abtidoon Islow Geedi

Current Nabadoon (Abakar): Nabadoon Iimaan Nabadoon Dilaxoow Nabadoon Jimcaale Nabadoon Gacal

According to author Abdukadir Osman (Aroma), in his book Taangiga Tigreega, the first Ugaas of the clan 300 years ago was Shiikh Xabbad Yabaroow, of the Habar Cayno subclan, who established his leadership by fighting in the overthrow of the Ajuran Sultanate according to some, "with weapons and bees". The Ugaas established a new division of labour for the 7 tribal lineages of the clan with each lineage given a part of the Qur'an to recite in commemoration of this new society. Hence, the Habar Maxamad who are the eldest, were granted the military class. The Habar Cayno, son of an Abgaal chieftainess, remained the longest elected and current traditional class. While the Majabe Sabti were granted the wealth and political power, the Abdalla Sabdi were pledged to become the educated and religious leaders of the clan. The Ugaas also coined the Saddex iyo Sagaal as an internal blood-money paying structure which was eventually adopted as a nickname. Thus the Murusade remained united upon these systems for generations.

When the Murusade went to War, they would use the 'three and nine' strategy to suss out non-clansmen. After they had gained a notoriety for ambushing and avenging against their enemies under the covers of darkness, they appeared in Somali mythology - known as Qori ismaris (he who rubs a stick), the Murusade were likened to wild predators (Afarqooble) who could shapeshift into humans at night. A common occurrence of these conflicts happened in Wardhiigley (the valley of blood) district of Mogadishu. Prior to being renamed Warta Nabada District (the Valley of Peace) by President Sharif Sheikh Ahmed, the area was a traditional battle ground between forces of the Abgaal and the Murusade for many generations, with various lines of poetry recited to remember the many victories and losses incurred. In Enrico Cerulli's study on the vaunts of subclans in southern Somalia, he mentions the following passage drawn from lines of local poetry;

“The wild beasts appeared and the Murúsada flung themselves upon them”

The verse refers to the belief in folklore that the Murúsada were werewolves; and thus here they seem to have stolen the ferocity of the wild beasts.

Besides the mercantilism long practised as a trade and a skill, the Murusade are also known as equestrians who breed high-quality horses in the Galgaduud region, especially in Ceelbuur, whose horses were employed in the Custodial Corps and the National Police Force. Though horses were only kept on certain occasions such as in times of war, business, festivals etc and not in general times of peace due to its inconvenience to camels and travel expenses, a fair number are wild horses who aren't captive or domesticated, free to roam the countryside most of the year, similar to the feral horses of Kundudo of ancient Karanle settlement. The town of Derri in Galgaduud, which homes some of the largest herd of horses in Somalia, was twin-named after the ancient Derri of Hararghe region, a strategic fort town surrounded by the horses of Kundudo mountains used in the times of Imam Ahmed Gurey. The long Karanle tradition of horses and affinity for ancient wealth in horses and camels can still be reflected in the clan's current interests in the Capital owning and supplying some of the countries top private airports, malls, hotels, automotives (Fiat) and storage facilities, making them a prosperous subclan in Somalia.

== Distribution ==
The Murusade clan predominantly resides in the central and southern regions of Somalia particularly in Galgaduud and Mudug which fall under the Galmudug state of Somalia, in addition to Banaadir, Lower Shabelle and Middle Shabelle, as well as to varying extents in Bay and Bakool.

Within Galgaduud, the Murusade primarily inhabit the central El-Buur and Galhareeri districts which are two of the five districts in the region, constituting the majority. They are also present in the adjacent El Dher district, constituting the predominant population in the northeastern sector of the district, extending down from El-Buur through the inland areas, including towns such as Bargaan, and proceeding southward towards the coastline of the Indian Ocean. Furthermore, the Murusade also inhabit the neighbouring Mudug region, particularly Harardhere and Hobyo.

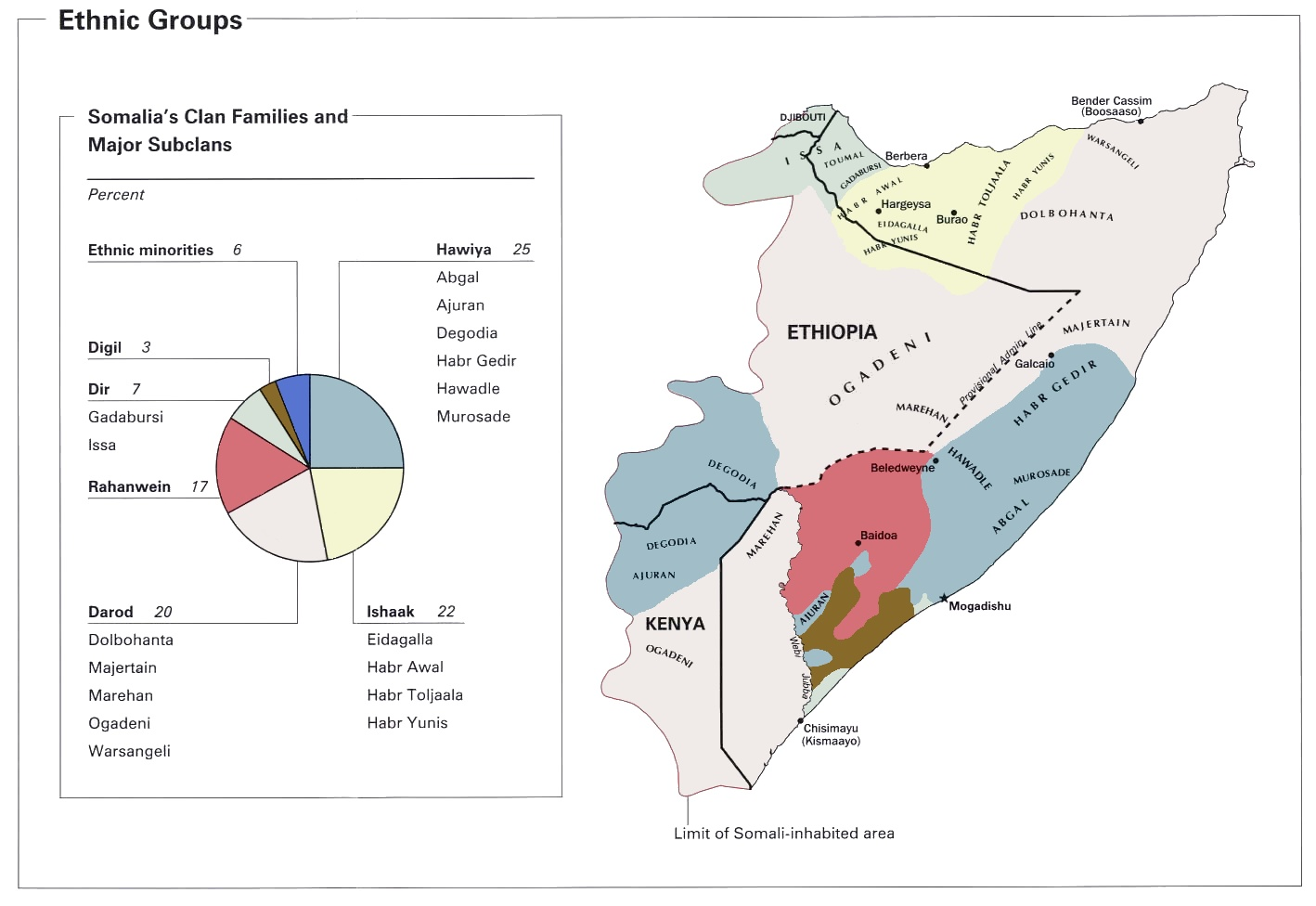
Distribution of Somali clans including the Murusade

In Banaadir, the Murusade are predominantly clustered around the national capital Mogadishu also, forming some of the earliest inhabitants of the city. They mainly inhabit the districts of Daynille, Hodan, Hawle-Wadag and Warta-Nabada but can also be found in other districts. The Murusade clan has established itself as a prominent force in these regions, transforming them into crucial centers that serve as epicenters of activity for a sizable community. This community is deeply engaged in the process of molding and influencing the social, economic, and political fabric of the city. Through their active involvement, the Murusade clan has played a pivotal role in nurturing the advancement and progress of Mogadishu, making it an even more vibrant and dynamic metropolis.

In Lower Shabelle, their communities can be found stretching down from the Dayniile district in Benaadir along the coast, most notably in Afgoye, Merca, Qoryooley, and Barawe, among others.

I.M Lewis (1995) states about the Murusade presence in Lower Shabelle:

The Murosade, who have become detached in the process of tribal movement, are found in small groups in the region of Merca and, in a larger body, below the Shebelle around Afgoi. They are essentially pastoralists although they practise some cultivation, and in the Merca region are engaged in the caravan trade.

== Branches ==
Murusade branches

The Murusade are divided into two main surviving branches, the Sabti and the Foor'ulus. The following listing is a genealogy of the Murusade clan, starting with Samaale, the ancestor and forefather of the Somali clans. However, some lineages are omitted.

Samaale
  - Irir
    - Hawiye (Sheikh Ahmed)
      - Karanle
        - Gidir Karanle
        - Sexawle Karanle
        - Karaiye Karanle
        - Mursal Karanle (Murusade)
          - Khalibar
            - Wacayle
              - Makahan
                - Garfuul
                  - Himyar
                    - Haylah
                      - Warwaaq
                        - Jiilaal
                          - Wacsalah
                            - Sabti
                              - Majabe Sabti
                                - Abu Bakr
                                  - Israfiil Abakar
                                    - Hasanle
                                      - Mohammed Mahmuud
                                      - Carif Mahmuud
                                      - Omar Mahmuud
                                      - Siicow Mahamuud
                                    - Gabood
                                      - Abu Bakar Wasuge
                                        - Mahamuud Abakar
                                        - Ahmed Gaab
                                        - Jim'ale
                                      - Mahamuud Wasuge
                                      - Mataan Wasuge
                                      - Gurey
                                        - Hassan Gurey
                                    - Dhaleey
                                      - Adam Cigalle
                                      - Mahmuud Wehiliye
                                      - Ali Abdalle Dhaleey
                                  - Codweyne Abakar
                                    - Hussein Coodweyne
                                      - Dhilaay (Muuse)
                                      - Muusetuur (Axmed)
                                      - Najac Kaboole
                                        - Mahamuud
                                        - Ali
                                      - Mohammed Hassan
                                    - Mahamuud
                                      - Hashane
                                        - Mohammed Cigalle (Dhagaweyne)
                                          - Osman
                                          - Jibriil
                                          - Mahamuud
                                          - Ahmed
                                          - Ali
                                          - Omar
                                          - Amanle
                                          - Saldhale
                                          - Jim'ale
                                        - Adam Cigalle
                                          - Basoy Aadan
                                          - Jale Aadan
                                          - Samatar Aadan
                                          - Jabiiq Aadan
                                        - Amaanle
                                      - Ibrahim
                                        - Gondaale
                                        - Dirir
                                  - Saeed
                                    - Tuurweyne Saeed
                                    - Abdirahmaan Saeed
                                    - Aadan Saeed
                                    - Rooble Saeed
                                - Habar Idinle
                                  - Ayansame
                                    - Hassan
                                      - Dumaal
                                        - Muhammed Ali
                                        - Ahmed Ibrahim
                                    - Hussein
                                      - Hassan Gadaf
                                        - Adan Sultan
                                          - Abdullahi Adan Sultan
                                          - Cadow Adan
                                          - Musa Adan
                                  - Gumacade
                              - Ibrahim Sabti
                              - Abdalla Sabti
                                - Absuge Hassan
                                  - Mohammed Yar
                                    - Adan gaab
                                    - Hassan caad
                                    - Abu-bakr Mohammed
                                  - Mahamuud Faqaay
                                    - Ahmed Musa
                                    - Osman Musa
                                      - Isse Osman
                                      - Roble Osman
                                    - Ali Musa
                                    - Hagaleey
                                - Ilkaguduud Hassa
                                  - Muse Gurey
                                  - Xareed
                                  - Caraale
                                  - Baane
                            - Foorculus
                              - Habar Mohamed
                                - Mohammed Foorculus(Hilibi, Bah Sheikhaal)
                                  - Qanyare Ishijwaaq
                                    - Tolweyne Qanyare
                                      - Mahamed Wehiliye
                                      - Abakar
                                        - Xuursho Abakar
                                          - Ali xurshoow
                                            - Maxamed faqay
                                            - Xalane Faqay
                                            - Cumar Faqay
                                            - Abdi Faqay
                                          - Cabdulle xurshoow
                                          - ismaan xurshoow
                                        - Hassan Abakar
                                        - Gaab Abakar
                                      - Ali Omar
                                      - Saaberey
                                      - Mataan Ali
                                    - Yabar Qanyare
                                      - Cigalle
                                      - Ali
                                      - Aden
                                      - Reer Farah
                                  - Hassan Ishijwaaq
                                    - Ciligaab
                                    - Cisman Mahamed
                                      - Hassan Adde
                                    - Ahaalow
                                  - Omar Ishijwaaq
                                    - Ma'alin Cigalle
                                    - Abdalla Cigalle
                                    - Mataan Cigalle
                                    - Hassan Cigalle
                                - Ahmed Mohammed (Daguuro, Bah Ajuran
                                  - Bah Maqafaad
                                    - Faqay
                                    - Isse
                                    - Hassan
                                  - Bah Muse
                                    - Da'ale
                                    - Afeey
                                    - Geedow
                                  - Bah Roon
                                    - Osman
                                    - Duje
                                    - Abdi Dhagey
                                    - Arablawe
                              - Habar Ceyno (Abakar, Bah Abgaal)
                                - Mahadle
                                - Mahammed
                                  - Sharey
                                - Yebedhaalo
                                - Ogoliye
                                  - Cindif
                                  - Yirird
                                - Tashiil
                                  - Ali
                                    - Tolweyne Ali
                                      - Omar Faqi Hassan
                                      - Aalim Reer Ugaas
                                    - yabar Ali
                                    - Omar Ali
                                      - Adan
                                      - Shareey
                                      - Ali
                                    - Ali
                                      - Gadafley
                                      - Khilaaf
                                        - Ahmed
                                        - Idris
                                        - Aflah
                                  - Irba
                                    - Abdalla Irba
                                      - Idriis Irba
                                      - Jimcaale Cariif
                                      - Saleebaan Irba
                                      - Huud Irba
                                    - Habar yaabiye
                                      - Jibraael
                                      - Qardabo

== Notable people ==
- Hassan Ali Khaire: former prime minister of Somalia and Presidential candidate.
- Mohammed Afrah Qanyare: former faction leader, Politician and Businessman. (Deceased)
- Abdirahman Janaqow: Deputy Leader of the Islamic Courts Union
- General Mohammed Sheikh Osman: former general and politician. Served as Minister of Finance and was one of the 25 member executive supreme revolutionary council that governed the Somali Democratic Republic.(Deceased)
- Hassan Moalim: Current minister of Constitution and Justice. Chairman of Daljir party.
- Ali Mohamed Osoble: Member of parliament, Co-founder of the USC and vice-chairman of the SNM. (Deceased)
- Abdulkadir Yahya Ali: a peace activist known for his work through his own Centre for Research and Dialogue.
- Abdirahman Yusuf Hussein Aynte: politician and journalist. worked for the BBC, VOA and Al Jazeera English. Former Minister of Planning and International Cooperation and former Senior Advisor to the President of Somalia.
- Hiirey Qasim Wehelie: Prominent politician and businessman, served as governor and district commissioner in several regions and as Minister of Housing and Urban Development.
- Ahmed Mahdi Gindhish: 19th Century Poet and Sheikh.
- Omar Muhammad Farah: former chairman of Ahlu Sunna Waljama'a paramilitary, son of a famous scholar in central Somalia (Deceased)
- Mohamed Hassan Xaad: First and current chairman of the elders council of the Hawiye Somali clan family formed to represent the Hawiye clan and advocate for their interests.
- Ali Mohamed Rage: Spokesman and Deputy leader of Al-Shabaab.
- Mohammed Moallim Hassan: former politician and minister of fishery and marine resources.
