= Ali Mohamed Rage =

Spokesperson for Al-Shabaab (2009–present)

- Cali Maxamed Raage علي محمد راجي
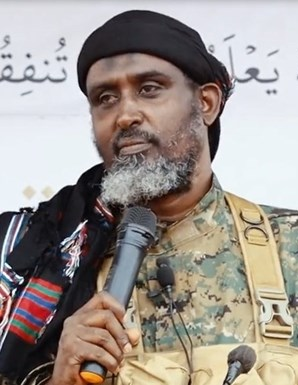
- Ali Mohamed Rage speaking at a graduation ceremony for new Al-Shabaab recruits in September 2022

Official Spokesperson of Al-Shabaab
- Incumbent
- Assumed office 21 May 2009
- Preceded by: Mukhtar Robow

Personal details
- Born: 1966 (age 59–60) Mogadishu, Somalia
- Nickname: Ali Dheere

Military service
- Allegiance: Al-Itihaad al-Islamiya (Unknown–1997); Al-Qaeda: Al-Shabaab (2006–Present)
- Rank: Official Spokesperson of Al Shabaab
- Battles/wars: Somali Civil War: War in Somalia

Ali Mohamed Rage, commonly known as Ali Dheere, is the head spokesman for the Somali militant group Al-Shabaab, and a member of the group’s supreme council.

== Early life ==
Accounts of Ali Mohamed Rage's origins differ. According to Garowe Online he was born in Hawaldag district of Mogadishu during 1966. BBC Somali reported that he was born near the town of El Buur in Galguduud. He is a member of the Murusade sub clan of the Hawiye.

Rage was one of the early youth members of Al-Ittihaad Al-Islaamiya (AIAI), and participated in the groups wars against the United Somali Congress and the Somali Salvation Democratic Front during 1992. He also participated in the 1996–1997 AIAI/Ethiopia war in the Gedo region. Following the dissolution of AIAI in 1997, Rage moved to Mogadishu and became a teacher at Al-Harameyn school. During the rise of the Islamic Courts in Banaadir region, he worked as a trader at a pharmacy in the Bakaara Market and spent his time off assisting Islamic Courts activities.

== Al-Shabaab ==
During the Ethiopian occupation of Somalia, Al-Shabaab’s top spokesman had been Mukhtar Robow. Following a dispute between Robow and the Emir of Al-Shabaab Ahmed Godane during 2009, Rage was made the groups spokes person. He was allegedly chosen by Godane to prevent defections and assure the loyalty Shabaab's Murusade clan fighters. He also serves as the head of the groups 'Office of Education'. In an interview with journalists, he would justify Al-Shabaab's targeting of hotels as legitimate military targets. During the 2011 East Africa drought, he would claim in an interview with Channel 4 News that there was no famine in the Bakool and Lower Shabelle regions. Soon after the start of the Kenya's 2011 Operation Linda Nchi, Rage would publicly warn “We shall come into Kenya if you do not go back.”

In March 2014, the Kenyan Defence Forces claimed to kill Rage. In August 2019, the Somali National Army (SNA) claimed to inflict critical injuries on him during a raid using Somali special forces. October 2022, the SNA also incorrectly claimed that they had killed Rage.

In 2021, the United States marked Rage as a 'Specifically Designated Global Terrorist' and in 2023, put a five million dollar reward for any information leading to his arrest.
