= Meerschaum pipe =

Smoking pipe made from the mineral sepiolite

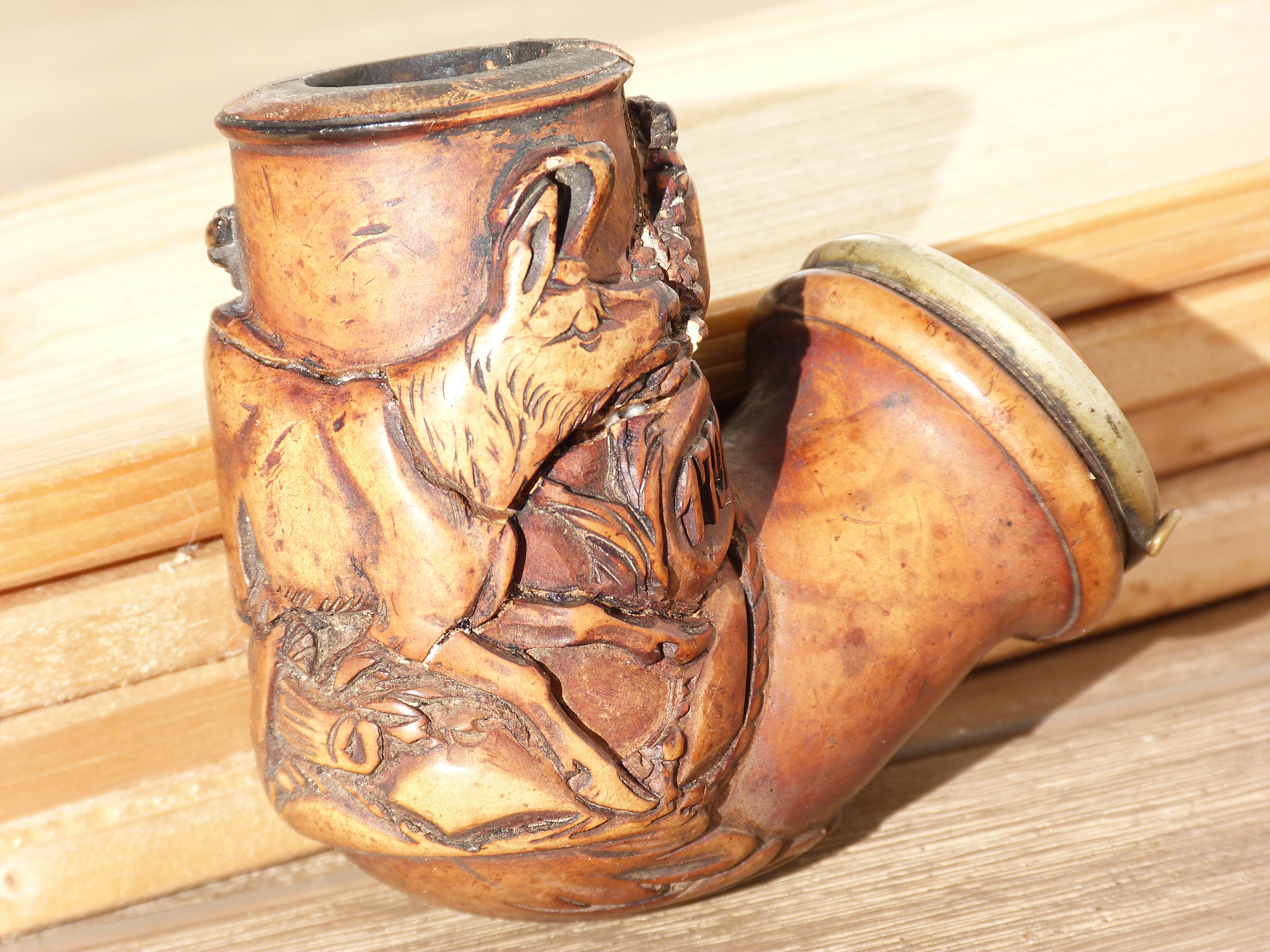
Pipe carved from meerschaum – Buda, Hungary, 1791

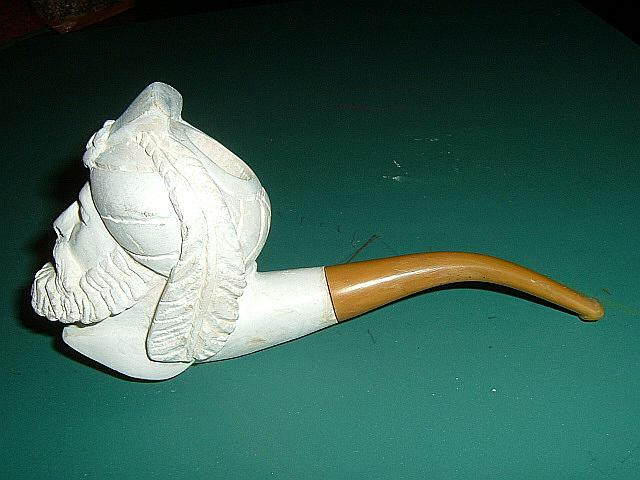
A smoking pipe carved from meerschaum and unsmoked

A meerschaum pipe is a smoking pipe made from the mineral sepiolite, also known as meerschaum. Meerschaum (German pronunciation: [ˈmeːɐ̯ʃaʊ̯m], German for "sea foam") is sometimes found floating on the Black Sea and is rather suggestive of sea foam (hence the German origin of the name, as well as the French name for the same substance, écume de mer).

== History ==
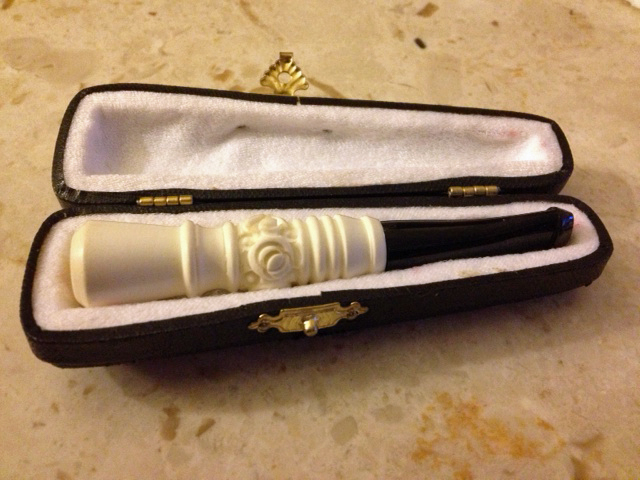
A meerschaum cigarette holder from Turkey

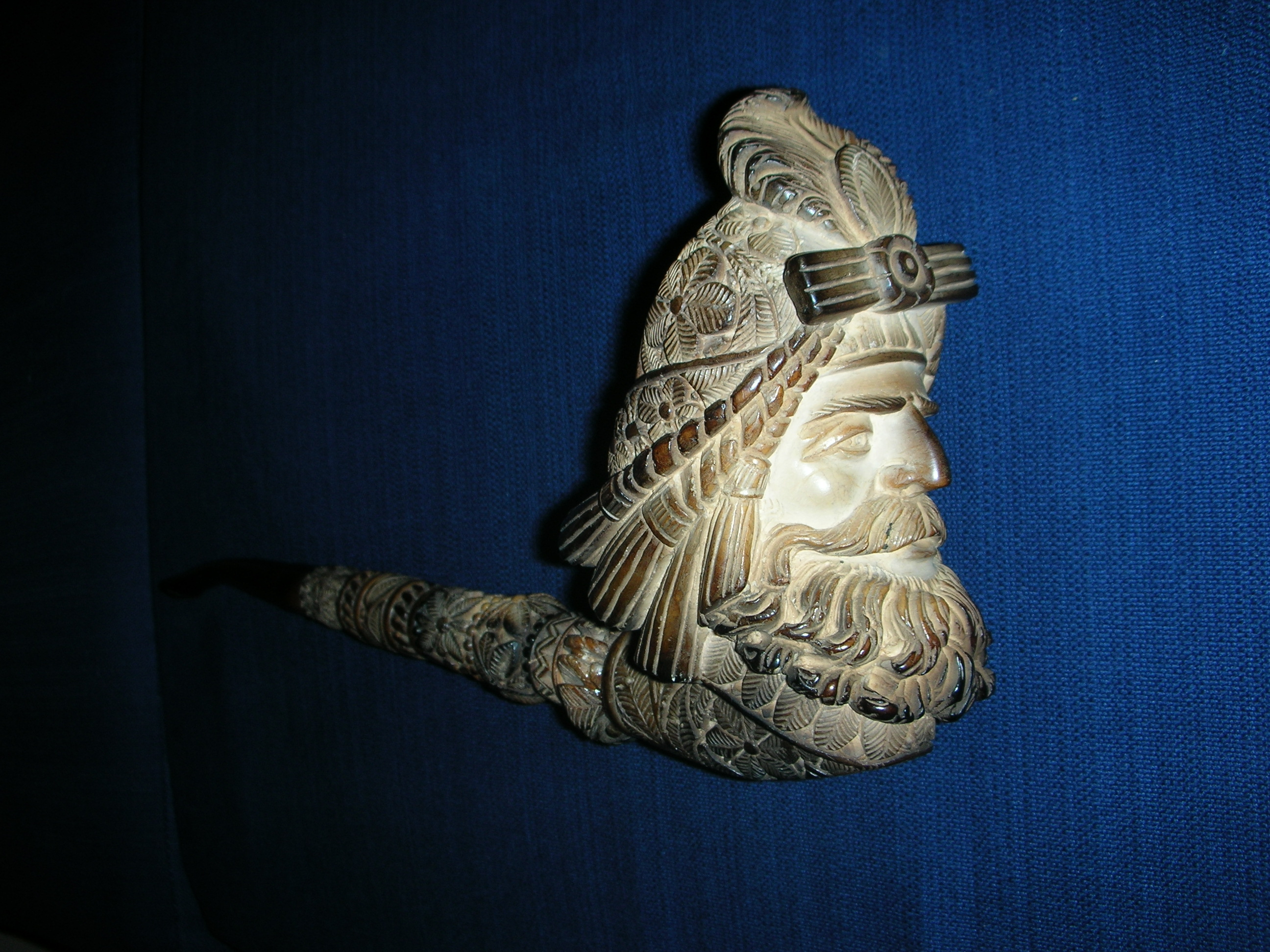
Meerschaum pipes may develop rich coloring from both age and use, which cannot be rushed as in this example.

The first recorded use of meerschaum for making pipes was around 1723. It quickly became prized as the perfect material for providing a cool, dry, flavorful smoke. Because of the porous nature of meerschaum, moisture and tobacco tar are drawn deep into the stone. Meerschaum became a premium substitute for the clay pipes of the day and remains prized to this day, although since the mid-1800s briar pipes have become the most common pipes for smoking.

The use of briar wood, beginning in the early 1820s, greatly reduced demand for clay pipes and, to a lesser degree, meerschaum pipes. The qualities of meerschaum were combined with those of briar pipes by lining briar pipes with meerschaum bowls. Some smokers believe that meerschaum-lined briar pipes give the porosity and sweet-smoking qualities of meerschaum along with the heat-absorbing qualities and durability of briar. However, meerschaum must be cool before a pipe can be cleaned, and briar must be rested after a few days of smoking, so the combination comes with some of the drawbacks of both materials. The thinness of the lining can affect how long a pipe lasts and some smokers do not clean out their pipes, causing the meerschaum to crack.

== Characteristics ==
Meerschaum does not burn and floats in water. It softens when wet, but hardens again when dried. Meerschaum, which expels moisture due to its porous structure, is therefore used in pipe making. When smoked, meerschaum pipes gradually change color, and old meerschaum pipes will turn incremental shades of yellow, orange, red, and amber from the base on up. When prepared for use as a pipe, the natural nodules are first scraped to remove the red earthy matrix, then dried, again scraped and polished with wax. The crudely shaped masses thus prepared are turned and carved, smoothed with glass-paper, heated in wax or stearine, and finally polished with bone-ash.

== Worldwide use ==
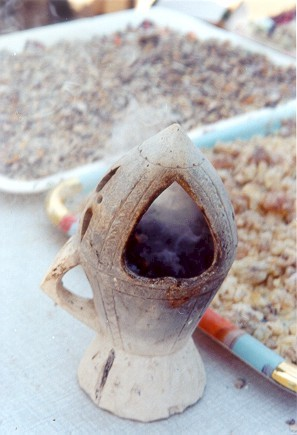
The dabqaad, a traditional incense burner in Somalia and Djibouti made from meerschaum

Carved Turkish meerschaum products were traditionally made in manufacturing centers such as Vienna. Since the 1970s, though, Turkey has banned the exportation of meerschaum nodules, trying to set up a local meerschaum industry. The once famous manufacturers have therefore disappeared and European pipe producers turned to others sources for their pipes.

Another variation of meerschaum pipe is the calabash pipe made iconic by William Gillette's stage portrayal of Sherlock Holmes. The calabash is a gourd similar to a squash, grown specifically for use in pipes. The shape is determined as the gourd grows by placing small blocks under the stem, forcing it into a gentle curve. The mature gourd is cut and dried, then fitted with a cork gasket to receive a meerschaum bowl. The finished pipe offers one of the coolest, driest smokes available.

In Somalia and Djibouti, meerschaum is used to make the dabqaad, a traditional incense burner. The mineral is mined in the district of El Buur, the latter of which serves as a center for quarrying. El Buur is also the place of origin of the local pipe-making industry.

== Similar materials ==
Imitations are made in plaster of Paris and other preparations.

The soft, white, earthy mineral from Långbanshyttan, in Värmland, Sweden, known as aphrodite (Greek: sea foam), is closely related to meerschaum. It is a synonym for the smectite clay: stevensite.

== In popular culture ==
Edgar Allan Poe mentions it in the opening sentence of The Purloined Letter.

In the 2004 film National Treasure, the second clue to the treasure is found hidden inside a meerschaum pipe. Later on in the film, the tobacco holder of said pipe acts as a key to opening the treasure vault.

In Samuel Beckett's 1957 one-act play Endgame, while Hamm is narrating the story of the day when he adopted Clov, he mentions how he was smoking a meerschaum pipe, after lighting it with a vesta.

In 1958, the popular American television sitcom Leave It to Beaver, season 2, episode 9, featured third-grader Theodore "Beaver" Cleaver and his friend Larry Mondello smoking a meerschaum pipe recently sent from Germany as a gift to Beaver's father. They are discovered because of the telltale discoloration of the pipe's bowl.

In the Dungeons & Dragons Forgotten Realms campaign setting, the legendary wizard Elminster is known for smoking a meerschaum pipe.
