= Battle of Deynile =

2011 Somali Civil War battle

- Part of the Somali Civil War (2009–present)
Date	20 October 2011
Location	Deynile Neighborhood of Mogadishu, Somalia
Result	al-Shabaab victory

Belligerents
Burundi	Al-Shabaab

Commanders and leaders
(Burundi) Egdi Hatungimana †	Abu Omar

Casualties and losses
(Burundi) 63 killed (per locals); 76–150 (per al-Shabaab); 10 killed, 2 injured (per AMISOM)	Unknown

The Battle of Deynile took place between Burundian troops in AMISOM against al-Shabaab in the Dayniile neighborhood of the Somali capital of Mogadishu, where Burundian troops launched a failed offensive on the neighborhood.

== Battle ==
Shortly after the shelling stopped, the Burundian army began to move in towards the district of Dayniile. Al-Shabab became aware of the army's movements when they were informed by reconnaissance teams, which gave them enough time to prepare for a possible ground assault. When Burundian troops moved in along their tanks and armored personnel carriers, they fell into an ambush by al-Shabab militants where fighting lasted for six full hours, until the military offensive was repulsed. Residents claimed the bodies of 70 soldiers were taken from the battle and brought into al-Shabab-controlled El-Maan area into the town of Alamada, 18 kilometers (11 miles) outside the capital, where the bodies were on public display to journalists and civilians. One witness recalled counted the bodies of 63 Burundian soldiers, all of whom were dead with bullet shots to the head or shoulders, and brought by trucks from Dayniile. No Somali soldiers were reported killed during the battle, with all the dead coming from Burundian forces.

== Aftermath ==
In all, during the initial battle al-Shabab claimed they have killed 150 Burundian soldiers but only have the bodies of 76 in their custody, the largest casualty loss for African forces in Somalia. The African Union dismissed the claims of the displayed row of dead soldiers bodies being AU troops, saying al-Shabab was trying to spread propaganda and in reality, only 10 Burundian soldiers were killed and two went missing in the battle.
