= Mohamed Hassan Xaad =

Nabadoon Maxamed Xasan Xaad (born 1940) better known as Nabadoon Xaad is the current chairman of the elders council of the Hawiye Somali clan family. He hails from the Mursall K. (Karanle) clan, subclan Habar Cayno.

== Career ==
Nabadoon Xaad begin his career in peacemaking at the onset of the Somali Civil War, working closely with Abdulkadir Yahya Ali. In 2006/2007, the Nabadoon along with 60 or so other elders, formed the Hawiye clan unity and peace council with himself as chairman, designed to advocate for the Hawiye clan in the face of political upheaval and conflict of interests between the different politicians and also to mitigate relations with other fellow Somali clans.

Nabadoon Xaad took on a prominent role during the Ethiopian-led War in Somalia (2006-2009), oscillating between advocacy for compensating the war damages, defending ones territory and calling for ceasefires. He has also long been a voice against the insurgency and terror campaign led by Hizbul Shabaab.
