= Omar Muhammad Farah =

Omar Sheikh Muhammad Farah
- Born: 1975; El Buur, Somalia
- Died: 16 May 2012 (aged 36–37); Mudug, Somalia
- Resting place: Salgadud, Galkayo, Somalia

Sheikh Omar Sheikh Muhammad Farah (Somali: Cumar Sheekh Maxamed Faarax) (1975 – 26 May 2012) was the chairman of Ahlu Sunna Waljama'a from 22 February 2009 to 18 April 2010.

Sheikh Omar, from the Murusade Hilibi subclan, was the son of Sheikh Muhammad Farah Ulusow (1895-1992) who was a 20th century scholarly figure in Central Somalia. He had taught Fiqh alongside household names like Sheikh Aden Dheere and Sheikh Yusuf Direed.

From 18 April 2010, Sheikh Omar has been defense secretary as well as the operation commander in Benadir region for Ahlu Sunna Waljama'a.

Later (since October 2010) he has been lobbying for Somali youth not to join any militias and not to be misguided.

== Death ==
On 26 May 2012 Sheikh Omar was injured in a road accident between Dagari and Galkayo in the Mudug region of Somalia. He was taken to a hospital in Galkayo where he died the same day. He was buried on 27 May in Salgadud graveyard in Galkayo.

Preceded by Unknown	Chairman of Ahlu Sunna Waljama'a; 22 February 2009 – 18 April 2010	Succeeded by Sheikh Ibrahim Sheikh Hassan
