= Herei Gassim Wehelie =

- حيري قاسم وهلي
- Born: 1929; Mogadishu, Somalia
- Died: November 11, 2012 (aged 82–83); Mogadishu
- Occupations: Businessman and politician
- Writing career
- Period: 1929–2012

Herei Gassim Wehelie (Somali: Xiireey Qaasim Weheliye) (1929 – November 11, 2012), was a Somali politician and prominent businessman. He was the founder and the owner of Bail Detergent Factory in Mogadishu, a company that manufactured and distributed laundry detergent and was the only business of its kind in Somalia at the time. In addition to his business achievements, He served as governor and district commissioner in several provinces in Somalia in the 1960s and also served as the Minister of Housing and Urban Development in the self-proclaimed government of Mohamed Farrah Aidid 1995–1996

== Early years ==
Herei was born in Mogadishu, Italian Somaliland in 1929 to a Murusade, Abdalla Sabdi family. He was educated in Switzerland and the United States in the 1950s. Herei graduated from University of Geneva (Université de Genève) in Geneva, Switzerland, with a degree in Politics and Public Administration in 1956. In the same year, he went to the United States where he pursued post-graduate education in the Industrialization of Developing Countries
