= Mohamed Qanyare Afrah =

Somali faction leader and politician (1941–2019)

Mohamed Qanyare Afrah محمد قنيري افرح

Minister of Security
- In office May 1995 – July 2008
- Preceded by: Ibrahim Omar Shaaweye
- Succeeded by: Mohamed Nur

Personal details
- Born: 1 August 1941 Somalia Ceelbuur
- Died: 29 June 2019 (aged 81) Nairobi, Kenya
- Other political affiliations: United Somali Congress
- Occupation: Political activist

Mohamed Qanyare Afrah (Somali: Maxamed Qanyare Afrax, Arabic: محمد افراح قنياري}(1941–2019) was a Somali faction leader and politician who was based south of Mogadishu in the Daynile District. He came in third position in Somalia's first election as a federal country on 10 October 2004 and was subsequently appointed minister of public security in the government of Prime Minister Ali Mohammed Ghedi, He served as minister of security in 2006 but was dismissed after ignoring calls by the Prime Minister Ali Mohammed Ghedi to stop fighting forces of the Islamist Courts. He continued to participate actively in Somali political affairs being reelected to the first post transitional federal parliament of Somalia as a member of parliament, he resigned from his seat representing his (Murusade) clan in the summer of 2013, his seat in the Federal Parliament of Somalia was taken over by his son Cabdiweli Mohamed Qanyare.

== Personal life ==
Mr. Qanyare Afrah joined the Somali Police Force after Somali independence in 1960, he rose to the level of Police Corporal before fleeing into exile in neighboring Kenya in the 1970s. In Kenya his brother Hassan Qanyare Afrah a well established business man who had built Speedways Trans - Africa a road haulage company, that grew into one of the preeminent commercial transportation enterprises in East and Central Africa of the 1970s and 1980s, invested in and became a shareholder in Mohamed Qanyare truck haulage company. In exile Mohamed Qanyare was a noted critic of the regime of Somali dictator Siad Barre, financially supporting different opposition movements against the former dictator, this support led to him being declared persona non-grata by the then President of the Republic of Kenya and close personal friend of Siad Barre and Daniel arap Moi.

== Somali Civil War ==
=== United Somali Congress ===
Qanyare was one of the founding members and financiers of the United Somali Congress (USC) created in Rome Italy on 26 January 1987, he had been from the start a strong supporter of the legitimacy of the self proclaimed government of Ali Mahdi and was a key facilitator of the splinter faction known as the "USC Mahdi," because of their following of Ali Mahdi Mohamed of (Mudulood) clan. The USC Mahdi faction was distinct from another branch run by Mohamed Farah Aideed, but he eventually changed sides serving as Minister of Interior in the so-called "Salbalaar" government administration set up by the USC/SNA faction led by Mohamed Farah Aideed.

During the early period of the civil war between 1993 and 1999 Qanyare was an active participant in several peace conference's held in Egypt, Ethiopia & Kenya, he was considered to be a fairly well established warlord, who derived income from several checkpoints around the main Bakaraa market commercial area of Mogadishu, as well as taxing the activities of the Dayniile airstrip, one of the many airstrips around the city of Mogadishu open at that time due to the closure of the main airport, as well as being a shareholder in the El-Ma'an port. used by Mogadishu businesses in lieu of the decade long closure of the main Mogadishu port.

=== Transitional National Government ===
In February 2001, Qanyare was persuaded to join the Transitional National Government (TNG). He served as the fisheries minister. In 2004, he was a presidential hopeful, but lost to Abdullahi Yusuf Ahmed.

=== Transitional Federal Government ===
In December 2004, Qanyare was appointed the position of Security Minister in the Transitional Federal Government (TFG). At the time, he was described as "one of Somalia's most heavily armed politicians" having a 2,000 man militia with dozens of technicals. He was also described as "a prominent businessman who runs an airstrip near the capital used by international aid agencies and importers of the stimulant leaf qat grown in Kenya and chewed by Somali men."

On 8 November 2005, a noticeable rift in the TFG was reported when Qanyare, along with fellow fraction leader and Commerce Minister Muss Sudi Yalahow, refused to meet with Prime Minister Ali Mohamed Gedi until the capital was relocated to Mogadishu. At the time, Jowhar, the seat of rival fraction leader Mohammed Dheere, was being considered as a capital seat instead because it was less violent. In early February 2006, Qanyare was pushing an alternate proposal to move the government seat to Baidoa, which irked Dheere greatly.

Qanyare later lost his post after entering into battle with the Islamic Courts Union (ICU) in the Second Battle of Mogadishu.

=== Alliance for the Restoration of Peace and Counter-Terrorism (ARPCT) ===
Mohamed Qanyare was a member of the Alliance for the Restoration of Peace and Counter-Terrorism (ARPCT), a group of Mogadishu warlords who sought to counter the growing influence of the ICU. The group was funded by the US CIA. Intermittent fighting between the ARPCT and rivals, including the Islamic Courts Union (ICU) took place early in 2006, such as a four-day battle which concluded on 27 March 2006.

=== Second Battle of Mogadishu ===
From May to June 2006, the ARPCT fought with the ICU for control over the ruined capital. The ARPCT lost and Qanyare and other warlords were forced to flee or capitulate to the ICU.

In June, Qanyare and his forces were forced out of the Deyniile neighbourhood. Garam-Garam was the "chief Commander of the militiamen loyal to Mohamed Qanyare" until he surrendered after the Second Battle of Mogadishu. Qanyare was the only warlord in Somalia who have never been supported by Ethiopia. In any regard, after the battle, Qanyare stayed in Somalia while all other warlords defected to Ethiopia.

For Qanyare's disobedience acting against the TFG government in entering into the conflict with the ICU, Qanyare along with other warlords were relieved of their government posts.

=== Return to Somalia ===
In July 2006, after regrouping a force of 150 men in Derri in central Somalia and escaping an assassination attempt by the ICU, Qanyare joined the TFG government at Baidoa to seek safe haven. Mohamed Dooli was mentioned as one of Qanyare's militia commanders at this time. Islamists bristled at the news.

=== Return to Mogadishu ===
On 29 December after the Fall of Mogadishu to the government, Mohamed Qanyare returned to the capital and made a plea for the federal government to not disarm the militias. On 31 December, surrounded in headquarters compound by a dozen technicals, he claimed to have 1,500 men under his command, and asserted government control over Mogadishu was an illusion.

=== Disarmament of militia ===
In January 2007, Qanyare Afrah, along with Muse Sudi Yalahow were the first warlords of Mogadishu to disarm, turning over their weapons and committing their militiamen to the government, though some of Suudi's arms remained in other locations controlled by Qanyare and Mohamed Dhere. The arms were accepted by the chief commander of the government army, Along with General: Brise and Naji and other dignitaries.

== Later years and death ==
As of 2014 Qanyare Afrah was living in semi-retirement in the Kenyan capital Nairobi. He died in Mogadishu on 29 June 2019.
