= Abdalla Sabti =

Abdalla Sabti عبد الله السبتي
- Hawiye Somali Clan
- Ethnicity: (Somalia) Somali
- Location: Somalia
- Descended from: Sheikh Ahmed Bin Abdulrahman Bin Uthman
- Parent tribe: Sabti
- Branches: Absuge: Mohammed; Mohammud; Ilkaguduud: Baane ilkagaduud; Xareed ilkagaduud; Caraale ilkagaduud; Muse (Gurey) ilkagaduud
- Language: (Somalia) Somali (Arab League) Arabic
- Religion: Sunni Islam

Abdalla Sabti (Somali: Cabdalle Sabdi, also spelled Cabdalla Sabdi; Arabic: عبد الله السبتي) are a Somali clan belonging to the larger Murusade clan, which itself belongs to the larger Karanle branch of the Hawiye clan. Its members live in Banaadir, Galgaduud and Lower Shebelle.

== Clan tree ==
Murusade branches including the Abdalla Sabti

The ِAbdalla Sabti are subdivided among Abdalla's two children. The following is a full genealogical list starting with Samaale, the forefather of the Somali clans; some names are, however, omitted.

Samaale
  - Irir
    - Hawiye (Sheikh Ahmed)
      - Karanle
        - Gidir Karanle
        - Sexawle Karanle
        - Karaiye Karanle
        - Mursal Karanle (Murusade)
          - Khalibar
            - Wacayle
              - Makahan
                - Garfuul
                  - Himyar
                    - Haylah
                      - Warwaaq
                        - Jiilaal
                          - Wacsalah
                            - Sabti
                              - Abdalla Sabti
                                - Absuge
                                  - Mohammed Yar
                                    - Adan gaab
                                    - Hassan caad
                                    - Abu-bakr Mohammed
                                  - Mahamuud Faqaay
                                    - Ahmed Musa
                                    - Osman Musa
                                      - Isse Osman
                                      - Roble Osman
                                    - Ali Musa
                                    - Hagaleey
                                - Ilkaguduud
                                  - Baane
                                  - Caraale
                                  - Xareed
                                  - Muuse Gurey
                                  - Caraale

== Prominent members of Abdalla Sabdi clan ==
- Abdulkadir Yahya Ali, A renowned peace activist.
- Mohamed Moallim Hassan, a politician who served as the minister of fishery and marine resources of the Transitional Federal Government (TFG) of Somalia from 12 November 2010 to 19 June 2011.
- Mohamed Nur Ga'al, a politician who served as Minister of state for foreign affairs under prime minister Abdi Farah Shirdon December 2012 to December 2013. Ga'al has also been the Galmudug Parliament speaker since January 17, 2020.
- Mariam Arif Gassim, member of Somali parliament since 2000. She is the author of the books "Somalia: clan vs. nation" and "Hostages: The people who kidnapped themselves" Maryam is also a business woman and hotelier.
- Herei Gassim Wehelie, One of the Somalia's most popular businessmen in the pre-civil war era running the famous soup and detergent factory in Mogadishu which was known as Bail. A Well known politician who served as governor and district commissioner in several provinces in Somalia in the 1960s and also served as the minister of housing and urban development in the self-proclaimed government of Mohamed Farrah Aidid 1995-1996
- Elian Yahye, A Young Somali Dutch activist and current Netherland youth representative for the United Nations.
- Abdulkadir Mohamed Mohamud, Also known as Caanaboore (Anabore), the deputy mayor and deputy governor of Banaadir regional administration since November 14, 2020.
