= Ahmed Mahdi Gindhish =

Somali poet

Ahmed Mahdi Gindhish (1818–1905) was a Somali poet and religious figure.

== Biography ==
He was born in Geladi in the Somali Region region of Ethiopia. He belonged to the Murusade Abakar tribe of Galgaduud.

Gindhish gained a reputation as a wise and religious peace maker, who exhorts his listeners and his relatives across the warring Somali clans to follow Muslim virtues - his awareness surrounding threats from Menelik and the Europeans, of the time of uncertainty, chaos and the later Colonial influence - to avoid the divine punishments of wrongdoers. His biographers wrote the book "Baaris ka fog siyaasad", translated to "Research removed from politics", discussing his life and poetry.
