= Mohamed Moallim Hassan =

Mohamed Moallim Hassan محمد معلم حسن
- Born: Mogadishu, Somalia
- Citizenship: Somali, British
- Occupation: Politician

Mohamed Moallim Hassan (Somali: Maxamed Macalin Xasan, Arabic: محمد معلم حسن) is a Somali politician. He was the Minister of Fishery and Marine Resources of the Transitional Federal Government (TFG) of Somalia from 12 November 2010 until 19 June 2011. When the former Somali prime minister Mohamed Abdullahi Farmajo resigned in June 2011, Moallim Hassan lost his ministerial position, and he was later appointed by president Sharif Sheikh Ahmed as his chief of staff. When president Hassan Sheikh Mohamud came into the power in September 2012, he replaced Mohamed with Kamal Dahir Gutale.

Moallim Hassan is from the Abdalla Sabdi sub-clan of the Murusade clan.

== See also ==
- Abdalla Sabdi
