= 1954 Italian Somaliland local elections =

Local elections were held in Trust Territory of Somaliland in May 1954 to elect members of 35 municipalities. The Somali Youth League won just over half of the 281 seats up for election.

== Campaign ==
A total of 15 parties and organisations contested the elections:

Party	Geographical reach	Clan status	Municipalities contested
Somali Youth League	National	Inter-clan	34
Somali African Union	National	Inter-clan	22
Hizbia Digil and Mirifle	Regional	Clan-based	15
Somali Progressive League	National	Inter-clan	12
Somali National Union	National	Inter-clan	7
Benadir Youth Union	Regional	Inter-clan	5
Somali National League	Local	Inter-clan	1
Abgalia	Local	Clan-based	1
Abgal Youth Association	Local	Clan-based	1
Ancora	Local	Clan-based	1
Leopardo	Local	Clan-based	1
Murosada Bloc	Local	Clan-based	1
Palma	Local	Clan-based	1
Six Shidle	Local	Clan-based	1
Somali Democratic Union	Local	Clan-based	1

== Results ==
Party	Votes	%	Seats
Somali Youth League	17,982	47.70	141
Hizbia Digil and Mirifle	8,198	21.75	57
Somali National Union	2,273	6.03	5
Six Shidle	954	2.53	8
Other parties	8,290	21.99	70
Total	37,697	100.00	281
Source: Sternberger et al.
