= Hubeer =

Somali clan

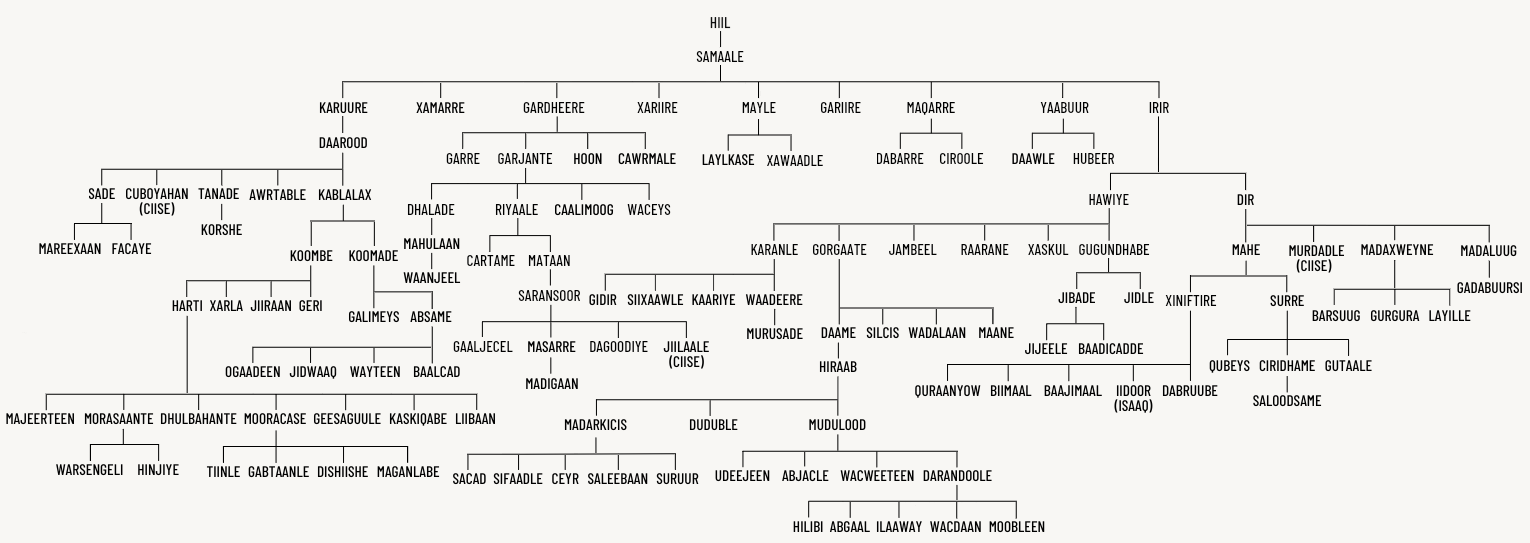
Genealogical tree of Somali clans

Hubeer is a Somali clan, Settled in the regions of Bay (Qansahdere & Baidoa districts), Lower Shabelle (Wanle Weyn district), Gedo (Bardere district) and Lower Juba (Kismayo & Afmadow districts). The assassinated Somali Minister of Public Works Abbas Abdullahi Sheikh Siraji was a member of Hubeer clan. Other prominent figures of this clan include Prof. Hussein Iman, one of the top Somalia agronomists, Dr. Abdirahman Mohamed Omar, former Attorney General before the civil war, Prof. Mohamed Ali Nur known as Prof. Dhakalow who is the father of scientific subjects (Math, Physics, Chemistry and Biology) in Somalia education field. Samaan Mohamed Sheik Dahir former MP (Chairman of Finance Committee of Somalia Parliament) and state minisrer for agriculture, Mohamud Abdi Hassan (Begos) former MP, state minister and deputy minister for foreign affairs, Sheik Ahmed Abdullahi Hussein (Sheik Fanah) former MP and state minister for Justice, Eng. Sadaq Abdullahi Abdi former minister for public works and MP, Malaaq Hassan Shurre Mohamud, former chairman of Digil and Mirifle traditional leaders (Chief of the chieves).

Though Hubeer is associated politically with Digil and Mirifle clans or Rahanwein, genealogically Hubeer descended from Yahabur Samaale which is one of the two major clans of Somali ethnic, the other one being Darod.
