= Howlwadaag, Mogadishu =

Hawle Wadag
- Neighbourhood
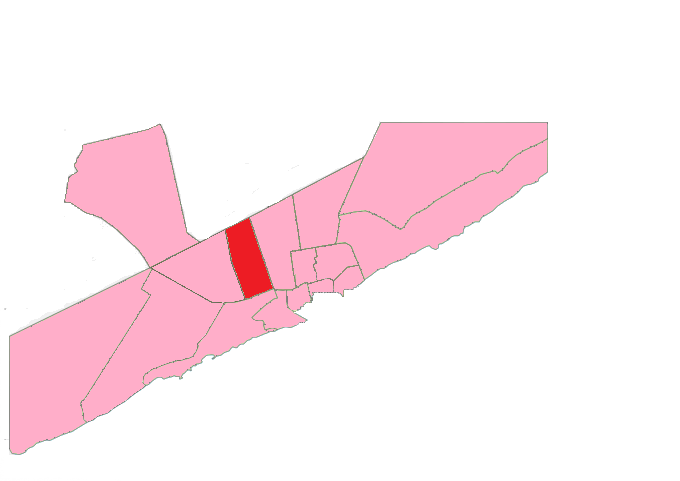
- Coordinates: 2.0333°N 45.3500°E
- Country: Somalia
- Region: Banaadir
- City: Mogadishu
- Time zone: UTC+3 (EAT)

Hawle Wadag Neighbourhood (Somali: Howlwadaag) is a neighbourhood in the central Banaadir region of Somalia. A neighborhood in north-central Mogadishu, the Bakaara Market is located here.

This neighbourhood is inhabited by the Murusade clan. In 2009 around area of Howlwadaag was an operation base by Al-Shabaab who harassed the civilians and attacked AMISOM from here whose defensive line was at the Sayyid Hassan statue site. This statue featured the Sayyid positioned on the Hiin Faniin, a Suleiman horse.
