= Daynile, Mogadishu =

Daynile
- Neighbourhood
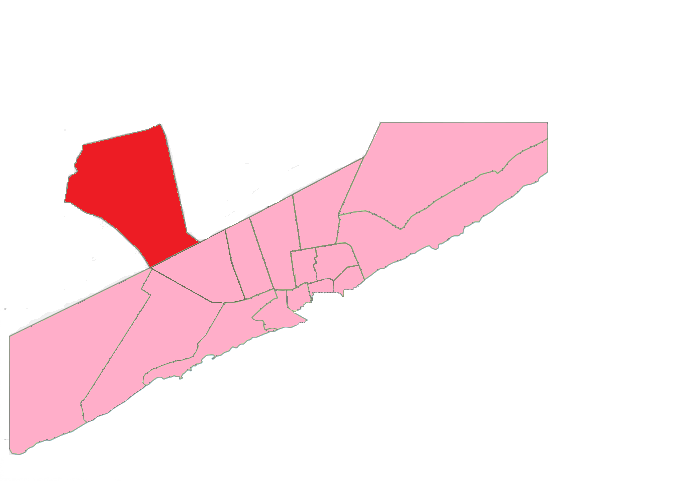
- Country: Somalia
- Region: Banaadir
- City: Mogadishu
- Time zone: UTC+3 (EAT)

Daynile Neighbourhood (Somali: Dayniile) is a neighbourhood in the southeastern Mogadishu city of Banaadir region in Somalia. It includes the northern outskirts of the national capital, Mogadishu. It is one of the traditional strongholds of the Murusade clan.

Journalist Robert Scahill writes that in early January 2003, and for some years before, Mohamed Afrah Qanyare controlled the Daynile airstrip, a few kilometres north of Mogadishu. His security force guarded its perimeter and land mines were laid in the 'bush' around it. Qanyare was wone of the most powerful warlords after the fall of Barre, and the airfield was used for importing khat into the country (Scahill, Dirty Wars, Nation Books, New York, 2013, 118). Eventually he helped the U.S. form the Alliance for the Restoration of Peace and Counter-Terrorism.
