= Sepiolite =

Soft and porous white magnesium phyllosilicate clay

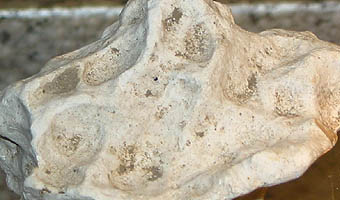

General
- Category: Phyllosilicate minerals
- Formula: Mg_{4}Si_{6}O_{15}(OH)_{2}·6H_{2}O
- IMA symbol: Sep
- Strunz classification: 9.EE.25
- Dana classification: 74.03.01b.01 Palygorskite-sepiolite group
- Crystal system: Orthorhombic
- Crystal class: Dipyramidal (mmm); H-M symbol: (2/m 2/m 2/m)
- Space group: Pnna
- Unit cell: a = 5.21 Å, b = 26.73 Å c = 13.5 Å; Z = 4

Identification
- Color: Grayish white, white, white with a yellowish or reddish tinge; bluish green
- Crystal habit: Compact nodular, earthy, clayey, massive; rarely fine fibrous along [001]
- Mohs scale hardness: 2
- Luster: Dull, earthy
- Streak: White
- Diaphaneity: Opaque
- Specific gravity: 2; dry porous masses float on water
- Optical properties: Biaxial (-)
- Refractive index: n_{α} = 1.520 n_{β} = 1.520 n_{γ} = 1.530
- Birefringence: δ = 0.010
- 2V angle: Measured: 20° to 70°, Calculated: 18°

Sepiolite, also known in English by the German loanword meerschaum (/ˈmɪərʃɔːm/ MEER-shawm, /-ʃəm/ -shəm; German: [ˈmeːɐ̯ʃaʊm]; meaning "sea foam"), is a soft white clay mineral, often used to make tobacco pipes (known as meerschaum pipes). A complex magnesium silicate, a typical chemical formula for which is Mg_{4}Si_{6}O_{15}(OH)_{2}·6H_{2}O, it can be present in fibrous, fine-particulate, and solid forms.

The fibrous clay minerals have been shown to exist as a continuous polysomatic series where the endmembers are sepiolite and palygorskite; there is a continuous variation in chemical composition from sepiolite, the most magnesic and trioctahedral endmember, to palygorskite, the least magnesic, most Al- and Fe-bearing, most dioctahedral endmember.

Originally named Meerschaum by Abraham Gottlob Werner in 1788, it was named sepiolite by Ernst Friedrich Glocker in 1847 for an occurrence in Bettolino, Baldissero Canavese, Torino Province, Piedmont, Italy. The name comes from Greek sepion (σήπιον), meaning "cuttlebone" (the porous internal shell of the cuttlefish), + lithos (λίθος), meaning stone, after a perceived resemblance of this mineral to cuttlebone. Because of its low relative density and its high porosity, it may float upon water, hence its German name: it is sometimes found floating on the Black Sea and rather suggestive of sea-foam, hence the German origin of the name as well as of the French name for the same substance, écume de mer.

== Characteristics ==
Sepiolite is opaque and off-white, grey or cream colour, breaking with a conchoidal or fine earthy fracture, and occasionally fibrous in texture. Due to the fact it can be readily scratched with the finger nail, its hardness is ranked at about 2 on the Mohs scale. The specific gravity varies from 0.988 to 1.279, but the porosity of the mineral may lead to error. Sepiolite is a hydrous magnesium silicate having the chemical formula Mg_{4}Si_{6}O_{15}(OH)_{2}·6H_{2}O.

Sepiolite can be identified in hand specimen by applying a drop of a saturated solution of methyl orange on the sample. A positive test result for sepiolite turns purple. This can distinguish calcite from sepiolite in the field: sepiolite reacts to change the methyl orange to a shade of purple where calcite remains orange.

When first extracted, sepiolite is soft. However, it hardens on exposure to sun heat or when dried in a warm room. Sepiolite can be distinguished from silica or calcite-cemented material by slaking: calcite-cemented material slakes in acid, and silica-cemented material slakes in alkali or alternating acid/alkali. Sepiolite-cemented material has been termed "sepiocrete" as calcrete, silcrete or ferricrete is used to refer to materials cemented by calcite, silica or iron . Soils that contain significant quantities of sepiolite may be more appropriately termed "sepiolitic" or "petrosepiolitic" depending on the degree of cementation.

Stabilization of nanosepiolite suspensions was improved using mechanical dispersion and bio-based and synthetic polyelectrolytes. Surface energy and nanoroughness were studied in two sepiolite samples.

== Location ==
From the perspective of its use as an absorbent, the main producing country is Spain. The Spanish deposits represent about half of the world's reserves of this mineral. The most important deposits, currently being exploited, are located in the provinces of Madrid, Toledo, and Zaragoza provinces. The best-known deposits of the material used in the manufacture of pipes and decorative objects (meerschaum) is obtained chiefly from the plain of Eskişehir in Turkey, between Istanbul and Ankara. It occurs there in irregular nodular masses, in alluvial deposits, which are extensively worked for its extraction. It is said that in this district, there are 4000 shafts leading to horizontal galleries for extraction of the sepiolite. The principal workings are at Sepetçi Ocağı and Kemikçi Ocağı, about 20 miles southeast of Eskişehir. The mineral is associated with magnesite (magnesium carbonate), the primitive source of both minerals being a serpentine.

Sepiolite is also found, though less abundantly, in Greece, as at Thebes, and in the islands of Euboea and Samos. It occurs also in serpentine at Hrubschitz near Kromau in Moravia. Additionally, sepiolite is found to a limited extent at certain localities in France, and is known in Morocco. In the United States, it occurs in serpentine in Pennsylvania, South Carolina and Utah. In Somalia it is mined in the El Buur district.

Sepiolite occurs as a secondary mineral associated with serpentine. It can occur as a precipitate in arid environments. It may be associated with dolomite and opal.

Owing to its fibrous mineral nature, sepiolite veins may contain the hazardous material asbestos; however, this is true of only a very rare form of sepiolite, as the two are formed in very different environments. Even where asbestos is not present, sepiolite is often mistaken for it. Careful analytical techniques such as X-ray diffraction (XRD) are able to easily distinguish the two.

Carved Turkish meerschaum products traditionally were made in manufacturing centers such as Vienna. Since the 1970s, though, Turkey has banned the exportation of meerschaum nodules, trying to set up a local meerschaum industry. The once famous manufacturers have therefore disappeared and European pipe producers turned to other sources for their pipes.

In the African Great Lakes region, large deposits of meerschaum were found in Tanganyika. The main deposit comes from the Amboseli basin surrounding the Lake Amboseli. Tanganyika Meerschaum is normally stained in shades of brown, black and yellow, and is considered to be somewhat inferior to Meerschaum from Turkey. The raw material was primarily mined by the Tanganyika Meerschaum Corporation and uncounted pipemakers throughout the world were supplied with Amboseli Meerschaum.

Significant quantities of sepiolite occur in soils of the arid west of South Africa. There is a geographic variation from the sepiolite-containing soils at the coast to palygorskite-containing soils inland that mirrors the sepiolite-palygorskite compositional continuum from sepiolite, the most magnesic and trioctahedral endmember at the coast, to palygorskite, the least magnesic endmember farthest inland. There are many instances of cemented sepiolite layers. The positive environment effect in the arid region is that sepiolite increases plant available water in the sandy soils. A negative effect is that the cemented sepiolite causes considerable geotechnical and geometallurgical difficulty for extracting the heavy minerals from the sepiolite-rich sands.

== Applications ==
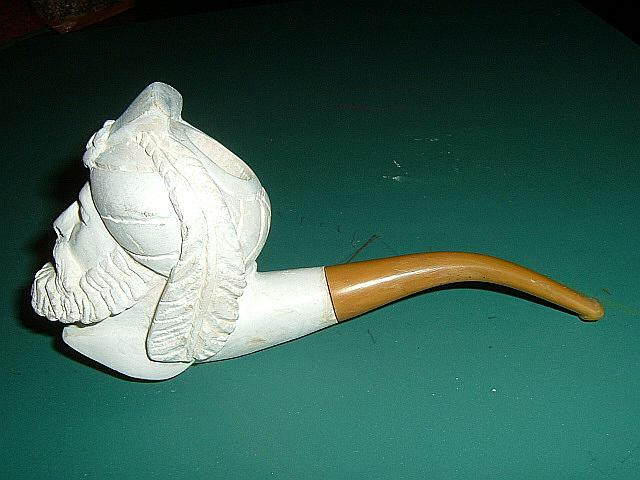
A smoking pipe carved from meerschaum

=== Carved pipes ===
Meerschaum has occasionally been used as a substitute for soapstone, fuller's earth, and as a building material; but its chief use is for smoking pipes and cigarette holders. The first recorded use of meerschaum for making pipes was around 1723 and quickly became prized as the perfect material for providing a cool, dry, flavourful smoke. The porous nature of meerschaum draws moisture and tobacco tar into the stone. Meerschaum became a premium substitute for the clay pipes of the day and remains prized to this day, though since the mid-1800s briar pipes have become the most common pipes for smoking.

When smoked, meerschaum pipes gradually change colour, and old meerschaums will turn incremental shades of yellow, orange, red, and amber from the base up. When prepared for use as a pipe, the natural nodules are first scraped to remove the red earthy matrix, then dried, again scraped and polished with wax. The crudely shaped masses thus prepared are turned and carved, smoothed with glass-paper, heated in wax or stearine, and finally polished with bone ash, etc.

=== Other uses and substitutes ===
Sepiolite is renowned industrially for its water-holding and sorptive capacities. It is a common ingredient in cat litter and in agricultural applications such as seed coatings. Sepiolite increases plant available water in sandy soil.

In Somalia and Djibouti, sepiolite is used to make the dabqaad, a traditional incense burner. The mineral is mined in the town of El Buur, the latter of which serves as a center for quarrying. El Buur is also the place of origin of the local pipe-making industry.

Imitations are made in plaster of Paris treated with paraffin and dyed with two types of coloured tree resins; Gamborge and Dragon's blood. Other methods of imitation are said to employ potatoes in the process.

The soft, white, earthy mineral from Långbanshyttan, in Värmland, Sweden, known as aphrodite (Greek: sea foam), is closely related to sepiolite.

In construction, sepiolite can be used in lime mortars as water reservoir.

Processes for bacterial transformation based on the Yoshida effect can utilize sepiolite as an acicular nanofiber. The Yoshida effect is the transfer of DNA to a bacterial cell using a mineral fibre that is a few billionths of a meter thick, essentially using the fibre as a tool to physically transfer the genetic material.

== See also ==
- Attapulgite – A magnesium aluminium phyllosilicate mineral
- Palygorskite – Magnesium aluminium phyllosilicate mineral
- Talc – Phyllosilicate mineral in the pyrophyllite-talc group
