= Abdulkadir Yahya Ali =

Somali peace activist (1957–2005)

Abdulkadir Yahya Ali عبدالقدر يحيي علي
- Born: April 23,1957; Mogadishu, Somalia
- Died: 12 July 2005 (aged 67–68); Mogadishu, Somalia
- Occupation: Peace activist
- Children: 6
- Writing career
- Period: 1957–2005
- Notable works: co-founder and director of the Centre for Peace and Dialogue in Mogadishu
- Literary movement: peace activism

Abdikadir Yahya Ali (Somali: Cabdiqaadir Yaxye Cali) (23 April 1957 – 12 July 2005), was a Somali peace activist, known for his work through his own Centre for Research and Dialogue. He was formerly an employee of the Embassy of the United States in Mogadishu.

Yahya worked as an independent consultant giving advice and administrative support to the International Crisis Group. He had devoted many years to foster peace and reconciliation in Somalia and was widely respected by his people and by many in the international community.

Abdikadir Yahya Ali hailed from the Abdalla Sabdi sub-clan of Murusade, a branch of the main Hawiye clan.

== Death ==
On 12 July 2005, Yahya was shot and killed at his house by a group of roughly 05-10 assassins, who used a ladder to scale the back wall of his compound. Yahye’s guards, some of them sleeping, were taken by surprise and handcuffed. Some of the men made their way to a second-floor bedroom and woke Yahya and his wife. They demanded valuables and took Yahye's laptop. Then, they led Yahya to a corridor where they executed him. He was shot with an AK-47 and then in the head with a pistol.

== See also ==
- List of peace activists
- List of Somalis
