= Dabqaad =

East African incense burner

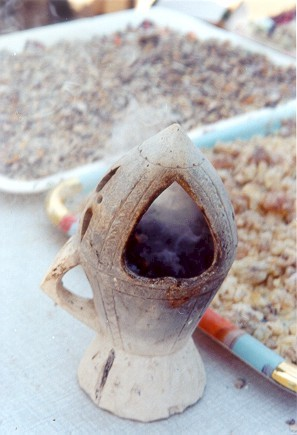
The dabqaad, a popular censer in Somalia and Djibouti.

The dabqaad (Somali for "fire raiser"), also known as girgire, is a Somali incense burner, or censer. With either one or two handles, it is commonly used in Somalia, Ethiopia and Djibouti.

== Usage and production ==
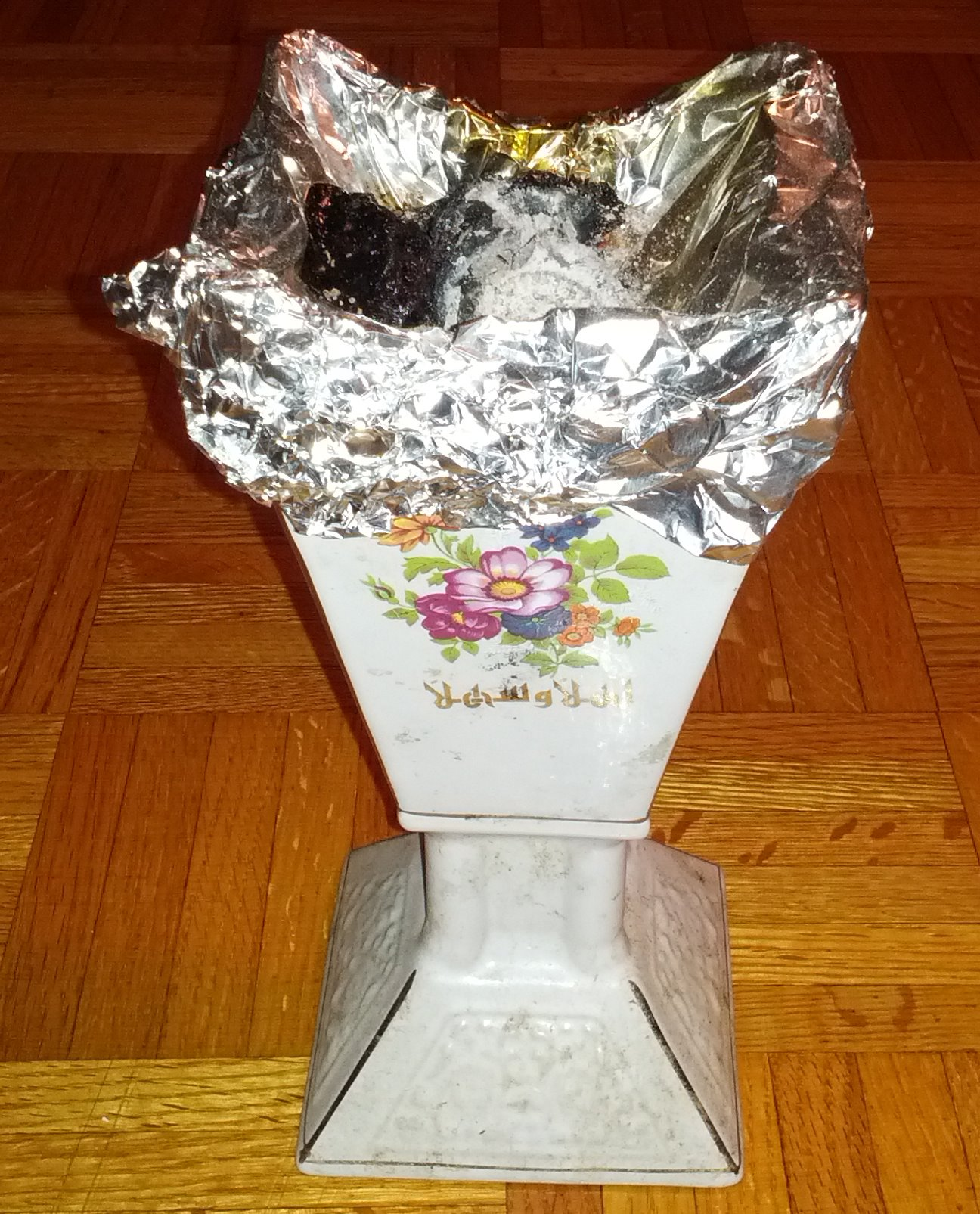
A modern metallic design dabqaad.

Dabqaads are traditionally used to perfume homes after large meals and/or during special occasions, such as when one is expecting guests.

Frankincense (foox/fooh) or a prepared incense (uunsi), is placed on top of hot charcoal inside an incense burner, the dabqaad. It then burns for about ten minutes. This keeps the house fragrant for hours.

The dabqaad pot is made from a white clay or soapstone found in specific areas of Somalia. Meerschaum (sepiolite) is used to make the dabqaad, with the district of El Buur serving as a center for quarrying. El Buur is also the place of origin of the local pipe-making industry. The ancient Egyptian pharaoh Hatshepsut was very fond of the incense when she went on her expedition to the ancient Land of Punt.

Somalis living in the West often obtain their dabqaads from the Horn of Africa, in person or through relatives.

== See also ==
- Bukhoor
- Mabkhara
