= El Buur =

Ceel Buur
- Town
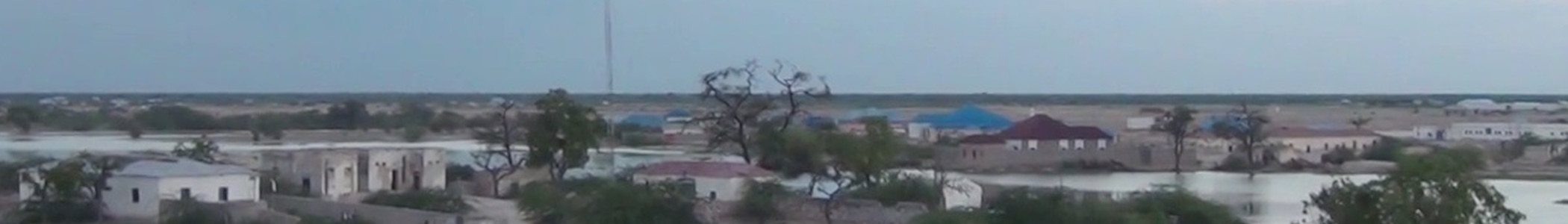
- Ceel Buur skyline

- Location in Galmudug somalia.
- Coordinates: 4°41′06″N 46°37′03″E
- Somalia: Somalia
- State: Galmudug
- Region: Galguduud

Population (2022)
  - Total: 130,023
- Time zone: UTC+3 (EAT)

Ceel Buur (Somali: Ceelbuur) is a City located in the region of Galguduud in central Somalia it is inhabited by the Murusade subclan of the Hawiye.

== History ==
Ceel Buur has been inhabited by the Murusade clan since at least the 13th century. During the Ajuran Sultanate it served as a local commercial hub.

The area is particularly noted as a center for quarrying. Here, meerschaum (sepiolite), was used to make the Somali people's trademark Dabqaad incense burner, is mined. El Buur is also the site of the local pipe-making industry.

During the early colonial era, Ceel Buur would form one of seven residencies of the Upper Shabelle region which included Balad, Villagio Duca Degli Abruzzi, Buloburti, Bugda, Bud-Bud and a Commissioner at Mahaddai. These had formed part of one of the four administrative regional divisions with seven residents each under southern Somalia called the Benadir colony. It became the site of battles between rebels loyal to Sheikh Mohamed Farah Rage From hilibi Mohamed sub clan Murusade and Sheikh Hassan Barsane and Italian troops. In 1926 when the ceel Buur Zone was named the first district of the newly formed Mudug Region, Captain Franco Carolei, the appointed Italian governor, would be assassinated by a young Abdulle Irrobe, Gelle Galaal and several rebel groups in a daring anti-colonial uprising.

It is traditionally majority inhabited by the Murusade sub clan of larger Hawiye clan.

In 1975, construction on CEEl Buur Airfield' would begin with the aid of technicians from the Soviet Union.

=== Civil War ===
In 1990 a hospital was constructed in El Buur, but never became fully operational due to the civil war that began soon after. On 23 July 1990, El Buur would be captured by the United Somali Congress (USC) and the town would become a base for the rebels. In November 1990, two Somali Air Force pilots would fly a Marchetti SF.260 and defect to the USC at the rebel base in El Buur. By December 1990 the town operated as the headquarters for Mohamed Qanyare Afrah and the USC during its offensive to topple the government of Siad Barre.

Following the large scale Ethiopian intervention in late 2006 and the collapse of the Islamic Courts Union (ICU), residents from the people residing in the El Buur formed a governing committee with representatives from all people in order to address lawlessness.

On August 25, 2023, the Somali National Army, alongside local militias led by Colonel Ismael Abdi Malik successfully ousted the terrorist group Al-Shabaab from CEEl Buur town. The capture of CEEL Buur in the Galmadug Federal Member State marks one of the most significant victories in the first phase of the government's offensive. This is due to towns strategic position in central Somalia and its importance to the terrorist group. The success of the offensive arises from a rare collaboration between the army and the macawisley militia. . "Victory to all Somalis. CEEl Buur district, a major al Shabaab stronghold, has fallen into the hands of Somali forces this hour. The forces are inside the town now," said Ibrahim Sheikh Muhydin, Somalia's army chief, in a speech broadcast live on Facebook.
