= 28th Parliament of Turkey =

Legislature of Turkey (2023–present)

- 2 June 2023 – current
- Speaker(s): Numan Kurtulmuş, AKP
- Deputy Speakers: Yusuf Beyazıt, AKP; Tekin Bingöl, YENİ Party; Celal Adan, MHP; Pervin Buldan, DEM
- MPs: 600
- Election: 14 May 2023
- Status: AKP minority government (with support from MHP, HÜDA PAR and DSP)
- Parties (at start) (Composition shown above): AKP (268); CHP (169); YSP (61); MHP (50); İYİ (43); YRP (5); TİP (4)
- Parties (at end): AKP (281); YENİ Party (90); DEM (56); MHP (46); CHP (44); İYİ (26); New Path (20); YRP (3); HÜDA PAR (4); TİP (3); DBP (2); EMEP (2); DP (1); SAADET (1); DSP (1); Independent (12); Empty (8)
- Presidents: Recep Tayyip Erdoğan
- Government(s): 67th

The 28th Parliament of Turkey was elected at the 2023 Turkish parliamentary election. It succeeded the 27th Parliament of Turkey in May 2023. The 600 members, elected through proportional representation from 87 electoral districts of Turkey, are shown below.

== Composition ==
Party	Elected	Current	Change	Current structure
Justice and Development Party	268	281	▲13	
New Party	0	90	▲90	
Peoples' Equality and Democracy Party	61	56	▼5	
Nationalist Movement Party	50	46	▼4	
Republican People's Party	169	44	▼125	
Good Party	43	26	▼17	
New Path	0	20	▲20	
New Welfare Party	5	3	▼2	
Free Cause Party	0	4	▲4	
Workers' Party of Turkey	4	3	▼1	
Democratic Regions Party	0	2	▲2	
Labour Party	0	2	▲2	
Democrat Party	0	1	▲1	
Felicity Party	0	1	▲1	
Democratic Left Party	0	1	▲1	
Independent	0	12	▲12	
Total	600	592	▼8	

== Changes ==
=== Changed parties due to electoral alliance ===
Member	Before	After
Önder Aksakal	Justice and Development Party	Democratic Left Party
Serkan Ramanlı	Justice and Development Party	Free Cause Party
Şehzade Demir	Justice and Development Party	Free Cause Party
Zekeriya Yapıcıoğlu	Justice and Development Party	Free Cause Party
Faruk Dinç	Justice and Development Party	Free Cause Party
Sadullah Kısacık	Republican People's Party	Democracy and Progress Party
Sadullah Ergin	Republican People's Party	Democracy and Progress Party
İdris Şahin	Republican People's Party	Democracy and Progress Party
Burak Dalgın	Republican People's Party	Democracy and Progress Party
Ertuğrul Kaya	Republican People's Party	Democracy and Progress Party
Elif Esen	Republican People's Party	Democracy and Progress Party
Hasan Karal	Republican People's Party	Democracy and Progress Party
Evrim Rızvanoğlu	Republican People's Party	Democracy and Progress Party
Mustafa Yeneroğlu	Republican People's Party	Democracy and Progress Party
Medeni Yılmaz	Republican People's Party	Democracy and Progress Party
Seda Kaya Ösen	Republican People's Party	Democracy and Progress Party
İrfan Karatutlu	Republican People's Party	Democracy and Progress Party
Selma Aliye Kavaf	Republican People's Party	Democracy and Progress Party
Mehmet Emin Ekmen	Republican People's Party	Democracy and Progress Party
Cem Avşar	Republican People's Party	Democracy and Progress Party
Mustafa Nedim Yamalı	Republican People's Party	Future Party
Serap Yazıcı Özbudun	Republican People's Party	Future Party
Cemalettin Kani Torun	Republican People's Party	Future Party
Sema Silkin Ün	Republican People's Party	Future Party
Selim Temurci	Republican People's Party	Future Party
İsa Mesih Şahin	Republican People's Party	Future Party
Doğan Demir	Republican People's Party	Future Party
Mustafa Bilici	Republican People's Party	Future Party
Hasan Ekici	Republican People's Party	Future Party
Selçuk Özdağ	Republican People's Party	Future Party
Mesut Doğan	Republican People's Party	Felicity Party
Şerafettin Kılıç	Republican People's Party	Felicity Party
Mehmet Atmaca	Republican People's Party	Felicity Party
Necmettin Çalışkan	Republican People's Party	Felicity Party
Birol Aydın	Republican People's Party	Felicity Party
Mustafa Kaya	Republican People's Party	Felicity Party
Bülent Kaya	Republican People's Party	Felicity Party
Mahmut Arıkan	Republican People's Party	Felicity Party
Hasan Bitmez	Republican People's Party	Felicity Party
Mehmet Karaman	Republican People's Party	Felicity Party
Cemal Enginyurt	Republican People's Party	Democrat Party
Haydar Altıntaş	Republican People's Party	Democrat Party
Mehmet Salih Uzun	Republican People's Party	Democrat Party
Ahmet Ersagun Yücel	Republican People's Party	Good Party
Mustafa Sarıgül	Republican People's Party	Party for Change in Turkey
Salihe Aydeniz	Green Left Party (The party later changed its name to the Peoples' Equality and Democracy Party.)	Democratic Regions Party
Keskin Bayındır	Green Left Party (The party later changed its name to the Peoples' Equality and Democracy Party.)	Democratic Regions Party
Sevda Karaca Demir	Green Left Party (The party later changed its name to the Peoples' Equality and Democracy Party.)	Labour Party
İskender Bayhan	Green Left Party (The party later changed its name to the Peoples' Equality and Democracy Party.)	Labour Party
Mithat Sancar	Green Left Party (The party later changed its name to the Peoples' Equality and Democracy Party.)	Peoples' Democratic Party
Pervin Buldan	Green Left Party (The party later changed its name to the Peoples' Equality and Democracy Party.)	Peoples' Democratic Party

=== Switched parties ===
- Mustafa Sarıgül (TDP → CHP)
- Mithat Sancar (HDP → DEM)
- Pervin Buldan (HDP → DEM)
- İdris Nebi Hatipoğlu (Good Party → Independent → AKP)
- Çiğdem Kılıçgün Uçar (DEM → DBP)
- Salihe Aydeniz (DBP → DEM)
- Suat Pamukçu (YRP → Independent → AKP)
- Ayşe Sibel Yanıkömeroğlu (Good Party → Independent → CHP)
- Aykut Kaya (Good Party → Independent → CHP)
- Seyithan İzsiz (Good Party → Independent → AKP)
- Ahmet Ersagun Yücel (Good Party → Independent → AKP)
- Bilal Bilici (Good Party → Independent → CHP)
- Dursun Ataş (Good Party → Independent → AKP)
- Ümit Özlale (Good Party → Independent → CHP)
- Mustafa Nedim Yamalı (Future Party → Independent → AKP)
- Ertuğrul Kaya (DEVA → SAADET)
- Mehmet Emin Ekmen (DEVA → SAADET)
- Kürşad Zorlu (Good Party → Independent → AKP)
- Selma Aliye Kavaf (DEVA → Independent → CHP)
- Cemal Enginyurt (DP → Independent → CHP)
- Mehmet Salih Uzun (DP → Independent → CHP)
- Serap Yazıcı Özbudun (Future Party → Independent → AKP)
- Mehmet Selim Ensarioğlu (Good Party → Independent → AKP)
- Ünal Karaman (Good Party → Independent → AKP)
- Hasan Ekici (Future Party → Independent → AKP)
- Seda Kaya Ösen (DEVA → Independent → CHP)
- Evrim Rızvanoğlu (DEVA → Independent → CHP)
- Cem Avşar (DEVA → Independent → CHP)
- Doğan Demir (New Path → Independent → CHP)
- İsa Mesih Şahin (Future Party → Independent → AKP)
- Hasan Ufuk Çakır (CHP → Independent → AKP)
- İrfan Karatutlu (New Path → Independent → AKP)
- Burak Dalgın (DEVA → Independent → Good Party)
- Ersin Beyaz (Good Party → Independent → AKP)
- Nimet Özdemir (Good Party → Independent → CHP → Independent → AKP)
- Mehmet Mustafa Gürban (Good Party → Independent → AKP)
- Ömer Karakaş (Good Party → Independent → AKP)
- Mustafa Bilici (New Path → Independent → AKP)
- Ali Fazıl Kasap (CHP → SAADET → CHP → New Path)
- Ali Yüksel (YRP → New Path)
- Cemalettin Kani Torun (New Path → Independent → AKP)

=== Became independent ===
- Koray Aydın (Good Party)
- Ahmet Zenbilci (AKP)
- Hasan Basri Sönmez (MHP)
- İsmail Akgül (MHP)
- Mustafa Demir (MHP)
- Mustafa Yeneroğlu (DEVA)
- Selim Temurci (Future Party)
- Ramazan Kaşlı (MHP)
- Ümit Dikbayır (Good Party → Independent → CHP → Independent)
- Adnan Beker (Good Party → Independent → CHP → Independent)
- Ahmet Eşref Fakıbaba (Good Party)
- Mustafa Sarıgül (New Party)

=== Those who resigned from their parties and returned ===
- On December 10, 2023, Nationalist Movement Party Kocaeli MP Saffet Sancaklı announced that he resigned from his party. He returned to MHP on April 15, 2024.
- Elected in the 2023 general elections as an Ankara MP from the İYİ Party, Yüksel Arslan resigned from the party on December 21, 2023 following the decision of then İYİ Party Chairwoman Meral Akşener to enter the 2024 local elections without an alliance and returned to the İYİ Party on April 9, 2025.
- On September 28, 2024, CHP Edirne MP Ediz Ün resigned from his party, He announced his return on July 30, 2026.

=== Establishment of a joint group between the Felicity Party and the Future Party ===
On 6 July 2023, 10 deputies from the Future Party (Mustafa Nedim Yamalı, Serap Yazıcı Özbudun, Cemalettin Kani Torun, Sema Silkin Ün, Selim Temurci, İsa Mesih Şahin, Doğan Demir, Mustafa Bilici, Hasan Ekici and Selçuk Özdağ) agreed to establish a joint group in the parliament with the Felicity Party.

On 16 December 2023, CHP member Ali Fazıl Kasap joined the Felicity Party so they could keep their parliament group after the death of one of their members.

=== Establishment of a joint group between Felicity Party, Democracy and Progress Party and Future Party ===
Member	Before	After
Birol Aydın	Felicity Party	New Path
Bülent Kaya	Felicity Party	New Path
Cemalettin Kani Torun	Felicity Party	New Path
Sema Silkin Ün	Felicity Party	New Path
Doğan Demir	Felicity Party	New Path
Mustafa Bilici	Felicity Party	New Path
Hasan Ekici	Felicity Party	New Path
Selçuk Özdağ	Felicity Party	New Path
Ertuğrul Kaya	Felicity Party	New Path
Mehmet Atmaca	Felicity Party	New Path
Mehmet Karaman	Felicity Party	New Path
Mehmet Emin Ekmen	Felicity Party	New Path
Mesut Doğan	Felicity Party	New Path
Mustafa Kaya	Felicity Party	New Path
Necmettin Çalışkan	Felicity Party	New Path
Serap Yazıcı Özbudun	Felicity Party	New Path
Şerafettin Kılıç	Felicity Party	New Path
Cem Avşar	Democracy and Progress Party	New Path
Elif Esen	Democracy and Progress Party	New Path
Hasan Karal	Democracy and Progress Party	New Path
İdris Şahin	Democracy and Progress Party	New Path
İrfan Karatutlu	Democracy and Progress Party	New Path
Medeni Yılmaz	Democracy and Progress Party	New Path
Sadullah Ergin	Democracy and Progress Party	New Path
Sadullah Kısacık	Democracy and Progress Party	New Path

On January 10, 2025, 17 MPs from the Felicity Party and 8 deputies from the Democracy and Progress Party united in New Path to establish a common group in the parliament.

==== Those who did not join the New Path group ====
- Mahmut Arıkan (SAADET)
- Selim Temurci (SAADET → Future Party)
- İsa Mesih Şahin (SAADET → Future Party)
- Evrim Rızvanoğlu (DEVA)
- Seda Kaya Ösen (DEVA)

=== The Formation of the New Party ===
- Ahmet Vehbi Bakırlıoğlu
- Ali Gökçek
- Ali Mahir Başarır
- Aliye Coşar
- Aliye Timisi Ersever
- Asu Kaya
- Aşkın Genç
- Ayça Taşkent
- Ayhan Barut
- Aykut Kaya
- Aylin Yaman
- Ayşe Sibel Yanıkömeroğlu
- Barış Karadeniz
- Bekir Başevirgen
- Bilal Bilici
- Burhanettin Bulut
- Bülent Tezcan
- Cavit Arı
- Cemal Enginyurt
- Cumhur Uzun
- Deniz Yavuzyılmaz
- Deniz Yücel
- Doğan Demir
- Ednan Arslan
- Elvan Işık Gezmiş
- Ensar Aytekin
- Evrim Karakoz
- Evrim Rızvanoğlu
- Eylem Ertuğ Ertuğrul
- Fahri Özkan
- Fethi Açıkel
- Gamze Taşcıer
- Gizem Özcan
- Gökan Zeybek
- Gökçe Gökçen
- Gökhan Günaydın
- Harun Özgür Yıldızlı
- Hasan Öztürk
- İbrahim Arslan
- İsmail Atakan Ünver
- İsmet Güneşhan
- İzzet Akbulut
- Kayıhan Pala
- Mahmut Tanal
- Mehmet Tahtasız
- Melih Meriç
- Metin İlhan
- Murat Bakan
- Murat Çan
- Murat Emir
- Mustafa Erdem
- Mustafa Sarıgül
- Mühip Kanko
- Nail Çiler
- Namık Tan
- Nurhayat Altaca Kayışoğlu
- Okan Konuralp
- Orhan Sümer
- Özgür Ceylan
- Özgür Erdem İncesu
- Özgür Karabat
- Özgür Özel
- Reşat Karagöz
- Salih Uzun
- Seda Kaya Ösen
- Servet Mullaoğlu
- Seyit Torun
- Sezgin Tanrıkulu
- Sibel Suiçmez
- Suat Özçağdaş
- Süleyman Bülbül
- Süreyya Öneş Derici
- Şeref Arpacı
- Tahsin Ocaklı
- Talat Dinçer
- Talih Özcan
- Tekin Bingöl
- Tuncay Özkan
- Turan Taşkın Özer
- Türkan Elçi
- Uğur Bayraktutan
- Ulaş Karasu
- Umut Akdoğan
- Utku Çakırözer
- Ümit Özlale
- Veli Ağbaba
- Yalım Halıcı
- Yaşar Tüzün
- Yunus Emre
- Yüksel Taşkın
- Zeynel Emre

Following the 2026 Republican People’s Party crisis of absolute nullity, the New Party was founded on July 24, 2026, under the leadership of Özgür Özel. Of the 135 MPs from the Republican People's Party, 91 joined the New Party.

=== Death of Members ===
- On 12 December 2023, Felicity Party deputy Hasan Bitmez suffered a heart attack during a parliament meeting. He died two days later, on 14 December.
- On 3 May 2025, DEM Party deputy Sırrı Süreyya Önder died at Florence Nightingale Hospital where he was being treated for multiple organ failure.

=== Unable to begin their duties ===
The Hatay deputy for the TİP, Can Atalay is currently imprisoned due to his suspected involvement in the Gezi Park protests and is therefore unable to take part in the parliament. Can Atalay lost his MP status on January 30, 2024 due to his imprisonment.

=== Resigned from their duties ===
- Burcu Köksal (CHP)
- Abdurrahman Tutdere (CHP)
- Ahmet Önal (CHP)
- Hasan Baltacı (CHP)

The listed MP's have resigned from their positions following the 2024 Turkish local elections in which they have emerged victorious in their respective cities.

- Murat Kurum (AKP) | Resigned after being appointed as Minister of Environment, Urbanisation and Climate Change.

== Members ==
Constituency	Member	Political party	Change
Adana	Ömer Çelik	Justice and Development Party	
Adana	Ahmet Zenbilci	Justice and Development Party	Independent
Adana	Sunay Karamık	Justice and Development Party	
Adana	Abdullah Doğru	Justice and Development Party	
Adana	Faruk Aytek	Justice and Development Party	
Adana	Orhan Sümer	Republican People's Party	New Party
Adana	Müzeyyen Şevkin	Republican People's Party	
Adana	Burhanettin Bulut	Republican People's Party	New Party
Adana	Sadullah Kısacık	Republican People's Party	New Path
Adana	Ayhan Barut	Republican People's Party	New Party
Adana	Muharrem Varlı	Nationalist Movement Party	
Adana	Ayşe Sibel Ersoy	Nationalist Movement Party	
Adana	Ayyüce Türkeş Taş	Good Party	
Adana	Bilal Bilici	Good Party	New Party
Adana	Tülay Hatimoğulları Oruç	Peoples' Equality and Democracy Party	
Adıyaman	Resul Kurt	Justice and Development Party	
Adıyaman	İshak Şan	Justice and Development Party	
Adıyaman	Mustafa Alkayış	Justice and Development Party	
Adıyaman	Hüseyin Özhan	Justice and Development Party	
Adıyaman	Abdurrahman Tutdere	Republican People's Party	Resignation
Afyonkarahisar	Ali Özkaya	Justice and Development Party	
Afyonkarahisar	İbrahim Yurdunuseven	Justice and Development Party	
Afyonkarahisar	Hasan Arslan	Justice and Development Party	
Afyonkarahisar	Burcu Koksal	Republican People's Party	Resignation
Afyonkarahisar	Mehmet Taytak	Nationalist Movement Party	
Afyonkarahisar	Hakan Şeref Olgun	Good Party	
Ağrı	Sırrı Sakık	Peoples' Equality and Democracy Party	
Ağrı	Nejla Demir	Peoples' Equality and Democracy Party	
Ağrı	Heval Bozdağ	Peoples' Equality and Democracy Party	
Ağrı	Ruken Kilerci	Justice and Development Party	
Aksaray	Cengiz Aydoğdu	Justice and Development Party	
Aksaray	Hüseyin Altınsoy	Justice and Development Party	
Aksaray	Ramazan Kaşlı	Nationalist Movement Party	Independent
Aksaray	Turan Yaldır	Good Party	
Amasya	Haluk İpek	Justice and Development Party	
Amasya	Hasan Çilez	Justice and Development Party	
Amasya	Reşat Karagöz	Republican People's Party	New Party
Ankara (I)	Gamze Taşcıer	Republican People's Party	New Party
Ankara (I)	Deniz Demir	Republican People's Party	
Ankara (I)	Okan Konuralp	Republican People's Party	New Party
Ankara (I)	Sadullah Ergin	Republican People's Party	New Path
Ankara (I)	Mustafa Nedim Yamalı	Republican People's Party	Justice and Development Party
Ankara (I)	Aliye Timisi Ersever	Republican People's Party	New Party
Ankara (I)	Tuğrul Türkeş	Justice and Development Party	
Ankara (I)	Jülide Sarıeroğlu	Justice and Development Party	
Ankara (I)	Murat Alparslan	Justice and Development Party	
Ankara (I)	Zehranur Aydemir	Justice and Development Party	
Ankara (I)	Koray Aydın	Good Party	Independent
Ankara (I)	Ahmet Eşref Fakıbaba	Good Party	Independent
Ankara (I)	Mevlüt Karakaya	Nationalist Movement Party	
Ankara (II)	Vedat Bilgin	Justice and Development Party	
Ankara (II)	Lütfiye Selva Çam	Justice and Development Party	
Ankara (II)	Orhan Yegin	Justice and Development Party	
Ankara (II)	Zeynep Yıldız	Justice and Development Party	
Ankara (II)	Osman Gökçek	Justice and Development Party	
Ankara (II)	Kurtcan Çelebi	Justice and Development Party	
Ankara (II)	Murat Emir	Republican People's Party	New Party
Ankara (II)	İdris Şahin	Republican People's Party	New Path
Ankara (II)	Semra Dinçer	Republican People's Party	
Ankara (II)	Sadir Durmaz	Nationalist Movement Party	
Ankara (II)	Adnan Beker	Good Party	Independent
Ankara (III)	Fuat Oktay	Justice and Development Party	
Ankara (III)	Leyla Şahin Usta	Justice and Development Party	
Ankara (III)	Ömer İleri	Justice and Development Party	
Ankara (III)	Asuman Erdoğan	Justice and Development Party	
Ankara (III)	Ahmet Fethan Baykoç	Justice and Development Party	
Ankara (III)	Tekin Bingöl	Republican People's Party	New Party
Ankara (III)	Umut Akdoğan	Republican People's Party	New Party
Ankara (III)	Mesut Doğan	Republican People's Party	New Path
Ankara (III)	Aylin Yaman	Republican People's Party	New Party
Ankara (III)	Yüksel Arslan	Good Party	
Ankara (III)	Kürşad Zorlu	Good Party	Justice and Development Party
Ankara (III)	Yaşar Yıldırım	Nationalist Movement Party	
Antalya	Mevlüt Çavuşoğlu	Justice and Development Party	
Antalya	Mustafa Köse	Justice and Development Party	
Antalya	Tuba Vural Çokal	Justice and Development Party	
Antalya	Kemal Çelik	Justice and Development Party	
Antalya	Atay Uslu	Justice and Development Party	
Antalya	İbrahim Ethem Taş	Justice and Development Party	
Antalya	Sururi Çorabatır	Republican People's Party	
Antalya	Cavit Arı	Republican People's Party	New Party
Antalya	Aliye Coşar	Republican People's Party	New Party
Antalya	Serap Yazıcı Özbudun	Republican People's Party	Justice and Development Party
Antalya	Şerafettin Kılıç	Republican People's Party	New Path
Antalya	Mustafa Erdem	Republican People's Party	New Party
Antalya	Abdurrahman Başkan	Nationalist Movement Party	
Antalya	Hilmi Durgun	Nationalist Movement Party	
Antalya	Uğur Poyraz	Good Party	
Antalya	Aykut Kaya	Good Party	New Party
Antalya	Saruhan Oluç	Peoples' Equality and Democracy Party	
Ardahan	Kaan Koç	Justice and Development Party	
Ardahan	Özgür Erdem İncesu	Republican People's Party	New Party
Artvin	Faruk Çelik	Justice and Development Party	
Artvin	Uğur Bayraktutan	Republican People's Party	New Party
Aydın	Bülent Tezcan	Republican People's Party	New Party
Aydın	Hüseyin Yıldız	Republican People's Party	
Aydın	Süleyman Bülbül	Republican People's Party	New Party
Aydın	Evrim Karakoz	Republican People's Party	New Party
Aydın	Mustafa Savaş	Justice and Development Party	
Aydın	Seda Sarıbaş	Justice and Development Party	
Aydın	Ömer Özmen	Justice and Development Party	
Aydın	Ömer Karakaş	Good Party	Justice and Development Party
Balıkesir	İsmail Ok	Justice and Development Party	
Balıkesir	Belgin Uygur	Justice and Development Party	
Balıkesir	Mustafa Canbey	Justice and Development Party	
Balıkesir	Ali Taylan Öztaylan	Justice and Development Party	
Balıkesir	Ensar Aytekin	Republican People's Party	New Party
Balıkesir	Serkan Sarı	Republican People's Party	
Balıkesir	Burak Dalgın	Republican People's Party	Good Party
Balıkesir	Ekrem Gökay Yüksel	Nationalist Movement Party	
Balıkesir	Turhan Çömez	Good Party	
Bartın	Yusuf Ziya Aldatmaz	Justice and Development Party	
Bartın	Aysu Bankoğlu	Republican People's Party	
Batman	Keskin Bayındır	Peoples' Equality and Democracy Party	Democratic Regions Party
Batman	Zeynep Oduncu	Peoples' Equality and Democracy Party	
Batman	Mehmet Rüştü Tiryaki	Peoples' Equality and Democracy Party	
Batman	Ferhat Nasıroğlu	Justice and Development Party	
Batman	Serkan Ramanlı	Justice and Development Party	Free Cause Party
Bayburt	Orhan Ateş	Justice and Development Party	
Bilecik	Halil Eldemir	Justice and Development Party	
Bilecik	Yaşar Tüzün	Republican People's Party	New Party
Bingöl	Feyzi Berdibek	Justice and Development Party	
Bingöl	Zeki Korkutata	Justice and Development Party	
Bingöl	Ömer Faruk Hülakü	Peoples' Equality and Democracy Party	
Bitlis	Hüseyin Olan	Peoples' Equality and Democracy Party	
Bitlis	Semra Çağlar Gökalp	Peoples' Equality and Democracy Party	
Bitlis	Turan Bedirhanoğlu	Justice and Development Party	
Bolu	Yüksel Coşkunyürek	Justice and Development Party	
Bolu	Türker Ateş	Republican People's Party	
Bolu	İsmail Akgül	Nationalist Movement Party	Independent
Burdur	Adem Korkmaz	Justice and Development Party	
Burdur	Mustafa Oğuz	Justice and Development Party	
Burdur	İzzet Akbulut	Republican People's Party	New Party
Bursa (I)	Efkan Ala	Justice and Development Party	
Bursa (I)	Refik Özen	Justice and Development Party	
Bursa (I)	Ahmet Kılıç	Justice and Development Party	
Bursa (I)	Emine Yavuz Gözgeç	Justice and Development Party	
Bursa (I)	Mustafa Yavuz	Justice and Development Party	
Bursa (I)	Kayıhan Pala	Republican People's Party	New Party
Bursa (I)	Nurhayat Altaca Kayışoğlu	Republican People's Party	New Party
Bursa (I)	Mehmet Atmaca	Republican People's Party	New Path
Bursa (I)	İsmet Büyükataman	Nationalist Movement Party	
Bursa (I)	Yüksel Selçuk Türkoğlu	Good Party	
Bursa (II)	Mustafa Varank	Justice and Development Party	
Bursa (II)	Ayhan Salman	Justice and Development Party	
Bursa (II)	Osman Mesten	Justice and Development Party	
Bursa (II)	Emel Gözükara Durmaz	Justice and Development Party	
Bursa (II)	Muhammet Müfit Aydın	Justice and Development Party	
Bursa (II)	Hasan Öztürk	Republican People's Party	New Party
Bursa (II)	Cemalettin Kani Torun	Republican People's Party	Justice and Development Party
Bursa (II)	Orhan Sarıbal	Republican People's Party	
Bursa (II)	Fevzi Zırhlıoğlu	Nationalist Movement Party	
Bursa (II)	Hasan Toktaş	Good Party	
Çanakkale	İsmet Güneşhan	Republican People's Party	New Party
Çanakkale	Özgür Ceylan	Republican People's Party	New Party
Çanakkale	Ayhan Gider	Justice and Development Party	
Çanakkale	Rıdvan Uz	Good Party	
Çankırı	Muhammet Emin Akbaşoğlu	Justice and Development Party	
Çankırı	Pelin Yılık	Nationalist Movement Party	
Çorum	Yusuf Ahlatçı	Justice and Development Party	
Çorum	Oğuzhan Kaya	Justice and Development Party	
Çorum	Mehmet Tahtasız	Republican People's Party	New Party
Çorum	Vahit Kayrıcı	Nationalist Movement Party	
Denizli	Cahit Özkan	Justice and Development Party	
Denizli	Şahin Tin	Justice and Development Party	
Denizli	Nilgün Ök	Justice and Development Party	
Denizli	Gülizar Biçer Karaca	Republican People's Party	
Denizli	Şeref Arpacı	Republican People's Party	New Party
Denizli	Sema Silkin Ün	Republican People's Party	New Path
Denizli	Yasin Öztürk	Good Party	
Diyarbakır	Berdan Öztürk	Peoples' Equality and Democracy Party	
Diyarbakır	Halide Türkoğlu	Peoples' Equality and Democracy Party	
Diyarbakır	Osman Cengiz Çandar	Peoples' Equality and Democracy Party	
Diyarbakır	Adalet Kaya	Peoples' Equality and Democracy Party	
Diyarbakır	Serhat Eren	Peoples' Equality and Democracy Party	
Diyarbakır	Sevilay Çelenk Özen	Peoples' Equality and Democracy Party	
Diyarbakır	Mehmet Kamaç	Peoples' Equality and Democracy Party	
Diyarbakır	Ceylan Akça Cupolo	Peoples' Equality and Democracy Party	
Diyarbakır	Mehmet Galip Ensarioğlu	Justice and Development Party	
Diyarbakır	Mehmet Sait Yaz	Justice and Development Party	
Diyarbakır	Suna Kepolu Ataman	Justice and Development Party	
Diyarbakır	Sezgin Tanrıkulu	Republican People's Party	New Party
Düzce	Ayşe Keşir	Justice and Development Party	
Düzce	Ercan Öztürk	Justice and Development Party	
Düzce	Talih Özcan	Republican People's Party	New Party
Edirne	Ediz Un	Republican People's Party	
Edirne	Ahmet Baran Yazgan	Republican People's Party	
Edirne	Fatma Aksal	Justice and Development Party	
Edirne	Mehmet Akalin	Good Party	
Elazığ	Erol Keles	Justice and Development Party	
Elazığ	Ejder Açıkkapı	Justice and Development Party	
Elazığ	Mahmut Ridvan Nazirli	Justice and Development Party	
Elazığ	Gürsel Erol	Republican People's Party	
Elazığ	Semih Işıkver	Nationalist Movement Party	
Erzincan	Suleyman Karaman	Justice and Development Party	
Erzincan	Mustafa Sarıgül	Republican People's Party	Independent
Erzurum	Selami Altınok	Justice and Development Party	
Erzurum	Fatma Öncü	Justice and Development Party	
Erzurum	Mehmet Emin Oz	Justice and Development Party	
Erzurum	Abdurrahim Firat	Justice and Development Party	
Erzurum	Kamil Aydın	Nationalist Movement Party	
Erzurum	Meral Danış Beştaş	Peoples' Equality and Democracy Party	
Eskişehir	Utku Çakırözer	Republican People's Party	New Party
Eskişehir	Jale Nur Süllü	Republican People's Party	
Eskişehir	İbrahim Arslan	Republican People's Party	New Party
Eskişehir	Fatih Donmez	Justice and Development Party	
Eskişehir	Aysen Gurcan	Justice and Development Party	
Eskişehir	İdris Nebi Hatipoğlu	Good Party	Justice and Development Party
Gaziantep	Abdulhamit Gül	Justice and Development Party	
Gaziantep	Mehmet Eyup Özkeçeci	Justice and Development Party	
Gaziantep	Ali Şahin	Justice and Development Party	
Gaziantep	Derya Bakbak	Justice and Development Party	
Gaziantep	Mesut Bozatli	Justice and Development Party	
Gaziantep	Şehzade Demir	Justice and Development Party	Free Cause Party
Gaziantep	İrfan Çelikaslan	Justice and Development Party	
Gaziantep	Bünyamin Bozdeyik	Justice and Development Party	
Gaziantep	Hasan Ozturkmen	Republican People's Party	
Gaziantep	Melih Meric	Republican People's Party	New Party
Gaziantep	Ertuğrul Kaya	Republican People's Party	New Path
Gaziantep	Sermet Atay	Nationalist Movement Party	
Gaziantep	Mehmet Mustafa Gurban	Good Party	Justice and Development Party
Gaziantep	Sevda Karaca Demir	Peoples' Equality and Democracy Party	Labour Party
Giresun	Nazim Elmas	Justice and Development Party	
Giresun	Ali Temür	Justice and Development Party	
Giresun	Elvan Işık Gezmiş	Republican People's Party	New Party
Giresun	Ertugrul Gazi Konal	Nationalist Movement Party	
Gümüşhane	Celalettin Kose	Justice and Development Party	
Gümüşhane	Musa Küçük	Nationalist Movement Party	
Hakkari	Vezir Coşkun Parlak	Peoples' Equality and Democracy Party	
Hakkari	Öznur Bartin	Peoples' Equality and Democracy Party	
Hakkari	Onur Düşünmez	Peoples' Equality and Democracy Party	
Hatay	Adem Yeşildal	Justice and Development Party	
Hatay	Abdulkadir Özel	Justice and Development Party	
Hatay	Hüseyin Yayman	Justice and Development Party	
Hatay	Kemal Karahan	Justice and Development Party	
Hatay	Mehmet Güzelmansur	Republican People's Party	
Hatay	Nermin Yıldırım Kara	Republican People's Party	
Hatay	Servet Mullaoğlu	Republican People's Party	New Party
Hatay	Necmettin Çalışkan	Republican People's Party	New Path
Hatay	Lütfi Kaşıkçı	Nationalist Movement Party	
Hatay	Adnan Şefik Çirkin	Good Party	
Hatay	Şerafettin Can Atalay (imprisoned)	Workers' Party of Turkey	Lost MP status
Iğdır	Cantürk Alagöz	Justice and Development Party	
Iğdır	Yılmaz Hun	Peoples' Equality and Democracy Party	
Isparta	Mehmet Uğur Gökgöz	Justice and Development Party	
Isparta	Osman Zabun	Justice and Development Party	
Isparta	Hikmet Yalım Halıcı	Republican People's Party	New Party
Isparta	Hasan Basri Sönmez	Nationalist Movement Party	Independent
İstanbul (I)	Murat Kurum	Justice and Development Party	Resignation
İstanbul (I)	Erkan Kandemir	Justice and Development Party	
İstanbul (I)	Hasan Turan	Justice and Development Party	
İstanbul (I)	Müşerref Pervin Tuba Durgut	Justice and Development Party	
İstanbul (I)	Hulusi Şentürk	Justice and Development Party	
İstanbul (I)	Mustafa Hulki Cevizoğlu	Justice and Development Party	
İstanbul (I)	Tuğba Işık Ercan	Justice and Development Party	
İstanbul (I)	İsmail Erdem	Justice and Development Party	
İstanbul (I)	Yahya Çelik	Justice and Development Party	
İstanbul (I)	Behiye Eker	Justice and Development Party	
İstanbul (I)	Serkan Bayram	Justice and Development Party	
İstanbul (I)	Ümmügülşen Öztürk	Justice and Development Party	
İstanbul (I)	Azmi Ekinci	Justice and Development Party	
İstanbul (I)	Nurettin Alan	Justice and Development Party	
İstanbul (I)	Oğuz Kaan Salıcı	Republican People's Party	
İstanbul (I)	Gamze Akkuş İlgezdi	Republican People's Party	
İstanbul (I)	Fethi Açıkel	Republican People's Party	New Party
İstanbul (I)	Gökhan Günaydın	Republican People's Party	New Party
İstanbul (I)	Birol Aydın	Republican People's Party	New Path
İstanbul (I)	Ahmet Ersagun Yücel	Republican People's Party	Justice and Development Party
İstanbul (I)	Elif Esen	Republican People's Party	New Path
İstanbul (I)	Hasan Karal	Republican People's Party	New Path
İstanbul (I)	Cemal Enginyurt	Republican People's Party	New Party
İstanbul (I)	Selim Temurci	Republican People's Party	Independent
İstanbul (I)	Ali Gökçek	Republican People's Party	New Party
İstanbul (I)	Suat Özçağdaş	Republican People's Party	New Party
İstanbul (I)	Nimet Özdemir	Good Party	Justice and Development Party
İstanbul (I)	Burak Akburak	Good Party	
İstanbul (I)	Mustafa Cihan Paçacı	Good Party	
İstanbul (I)	Edip Semih Yalçın	Nationalist Movement Party	
İstanbul (I)	İzzet Ulvi Yönter	Nationalist Movement Party	
İstanbul (I)	Sırrı Süreyya Önder	Peoples' Equality and Democracy Party	Death
İstanbul (I)	Keziban Konukcu Kok	Peoples' Equality and Democracy Party	
İstanbul (I)	Sera Kadıgil	Workers' Party of Turkey	
İstanbul (I)	Suat Pamukçu	New Welfare Party	Justice and Development Party
İstanbul (II)	Süleyman Soylu	Justice and Development Party	
İstanbul (II)	Halit Yerebakan	Justice and Development Party	
İstanbul (II)	Rabia İlhan	Justice and Development Party	
İstanbul (II)	Önder Aksakal	Justice and Development Party	Democratic Left Party
İstanbul (II)	Mustafa Demir	Justice and Development Party	
İstanbul (II)	İsmail Emrah Karayel	Justice and Development Party	
İstanbul (II)	Zafer Sırakaya	Justice and Development Party	
İstanbul (II)	Büşra Paker	Justice and Development Party	
İstanbul (II)	Sevan Sıvacıoğlu	Justice and Development Party	
İstanbul (II)	Derya Ayaydın	Justice and Development Party	
İstanbul (II)	Adem Yıldırım	Justice and Development Party	
İstanbul (II)	Sena Nur Çelik	Justice and Development Party	
İstanbul (II)	Namik Tan	Republican People's Party	New Party
İstanbul (II)	Yunus Emre	Republican People's Party	New Party
İstanbul (II)	Gökan Zeybek	Republican People's Party	New Party
İstanbul (II)	Enis Berberoğlu	Republican People's Party	
İstanbul (II)	Yüksel Mansur Kılınç	Republican People's Party	
İstanbul (II)	Mustafa Kaya	Republican People's Party	New Path
İstanbul (II)	İsa Mesih Şahin	Republican People's Party	Justice and Development Party
İstanbul (II)	Evrim Rızvanoğlu	Republican People's Party	New Party
İstanbul (II)	Mehmet Satuk Buğra Kavuncu	Good Party	
İstanbul (II)	Mehmet Selim Ensarioğlu	Good Party	Justice and Development Party
İstanbul (II)	Cengiz Çiçek	Peoples' Equality and Democracy Party	
İstanbul (II)	Özgül Saki	Peoples' Equality and Democracy Party	
İstanbul (II)	Celal Adan	Nationalist Movement Party	
İstanbul (II)	Ahmet Şık	Workers' Party of Turkey	
İstanbul (II)	Muhammed Ali Fatih Erbakan	New Welfare Party	
İstanbul (III)	Numan Kurtulmuş	Justice and Development Party	
İstanbul (III)	Özlem Zengin	Justice and Development Party	
İstanbul (III)	Cüneyt Yüksel	Justice and Development Party	
İstanbul (III)	Zekeriya Yapıcıoğlu	Justice and Development Party	Free Cause Party
İstanbul (III)	Halis Dalkılıç	Justice and Development Party	
İstanbul (III)	Rümeysa Kadak	Justice and Development Party	
İstanbul (III)	Oğuz Üçüncü	Justice and Development Party	
İstanbul (III)	Bayram Şenocak	Justice and Development Party	
İstanbul (III)	Şamil Ayrım	Justice and Development Party	
İstanbul (III)	Seda Gören Bölük	Justice and Development Party	
İstanbul (III)	Nilhan Ayan	Justice and Development Party	
İstanbul (III)	Yıldız Konal Süslü	Justice and Development Party	
İstanbul (III)	Şengül Karslı	Justice and Development Party	
İstanbul (III)	Yücel Arzen Hacıoğulları	Justice and Development Party	
İstanbul (III)	Engin Altay	Republican People's Party	
İstanbul (III)	Erdoğan Toprak	Republican People's Party	
İstanbul (III)	Türkan Elçi	Republican People's Party	New Party
İstanbul (III)	İlhan Kesici	Republican People's Party	
İstanbul (III)	Zeynel Emre	Republican People's Party	New Party
İstanbul (III)	Mustafa Yeneroğlu	Republican People's Party	Independent
İstanbul (III)	Medeni Yılmaz	Republican People's Party	New Path
İstanbul (III)	Bülent Kaya	Republican People's Party	New Path
İstanbul (III)	Doğan Demir	Republican People's Party	New Party
İstanbul (III)	Özgür Karabat	Republican People's Party	New Party
İstanbul (III)	Turan Taşkın Özer	Republican People's Party	New Party
İstanbul (III)	Çiğdem Kılıçgün Uçar	Peoples' Equality and Democracy Party	Democratic Regions Party
İstanbul (III)	İskender Bayhan	Peoples' Equality and Democracy Party	Labour Party
İstanbul (III)	Çiçek Otlu	Peoples' Equality and Democracy Party	
İstanbul (III)	Celal Fırat	Peoples' Equality and Democracy Party	
İstanbul (III)	Ersin Beyaz	Good Party	Justice and Development Party
İstanbul (III)	Seyithan İzsiz	Good Party	Justice and Development Party
İstanbul (III)	Ayşe Sibel Yanıkömeroğlu	Good Party	New Party
İstanbul (III)	Feti Yıldız	Nationalist Movement Party	
İstanbul (III)	İsmail Faruk Aksu	Nationalist Movement Party	
İstanbul (III)	Erkan Baş	Workers' Party of Turkey	
İstanbul (III)	Doğan Bekin	New Welfare Party	
İzmir (I)	Yüksel Taşkın	Republican People's Party	New Party
İzmir (I)	Tuncay Özkan	Republican People's Party	New Party
İzmir (I)	Sevda Erdan Kılıç	Republican People's Party	
İzmir (I)	Murat Bakan	Republican People's Party	New Party
İzmir (I)	Ednan Arslan	Republican People's Party	New Party
İzmir (I)	Seda Kaya Ösen	Republican People's Party	New Party
İzmir (I)	Haydar Altıntaş	Republican People's Party	Democrat Party
İzmir (I)	Mehmet Muharrem Kasapoğlu	Justice and Development Party	
İzmir (I)	Mahmut Atilla Kaya	Justice and Development Party	
İzmir (I)	Şebnem Bursalı	Justice and Development Party	
İzmir (I)	Mehmet Ali Çelebi	Justice and Development Party	
İzmir (I)	Müsavat Dervişoğlu	Good Party	
İzmir (I)	Ümit Özlale	Good Party	New Party
İzmir (I)	Burcugül Çubuk	Peoples' Equality and Democracy Party	
İzmir (II)	Gökçe Gökçen	Republican People's Party	New Party
İzmir (II)	Rıfat Turuntay Nalbantoğlu	Republican People's Party	
İzmir (II)	Rahmi Aşkın Türeli	Republican People's Party	
İzmir (II)	Mahir Polat	Republican People's Party	
İzmir (II)	Mehmet Salih Uzun	Republican People's Party	New Party
İzmir (II)	Deniz Yücel	Republican People's Party	New Party
İzmir (II)	Mustafa Bilici	Republican People's Party	Justice and Development Party
İzmir (II)	Eyyüp Kadir İnan	Justice and Development Party	
İzmir (II)	Alpay Özalan	Justice and Development Party	
İzmir (II)	Ceyda Bölünmez Çankırı	Justice and Development Party	
İzmir (II)	Yaşar Kırkpınar	Justice and Development Party	
İzmir (II)	Tamer Osmanağaoğlu	Nationalist Movement Party	
İzmir (II)	Hüsmen Kırkpınar	Good Party	
İzmir (II)	İbrahim Akın	Peoples' Equality and Democracy Party	
Kahramanmaraş	Vahit Kirişci	Justice and Development Party	
Kahramanmaraş	Ömer Oruç Bilal Debgici	Justice and Development Party	
Kahramanmaraş	Mevlüt Kurt	Justice and Development Party	
Kahramanmaraş	Tuba Köksal	Justice and Development Party	
Kahramanmaraş	Mehmet Şahin	Justice and Development Party	
Kahramanmaraş	Ali Öztunç	Republican People's Party	
Kahramanmaraş	İrfan Karatutlu	Republican People's Party	Justice and Development Party
Kahramanmaraş	Zuhal Karakoç Dora	Nationalist Movement Party	
Karabük	Cem Şahin	Justice and Development Party	
Karabük	Durmuş Ali Keskinkılıç	Justice and Development Party	
Karabük	Cevdet Akay	Republican People's Party	
Karaman	Selman Oğuzhan Eser	Justice and Development Party	
Karaman	Osman Sağlam	Justice and Development Party	
Karaman	İsmail Atakan Ünver	Republican People's Party	New Party
Kars	Adem Çalkın	Justice and Development Party	
Kars	İnan Akgün Alp	Republican People's Party	
Kars	Gülüstan Kılıç Koçyiğit	Peoples' Equality and Democracy Party	
Kastamonu	Halil Uluay	Justice and Development Party	
Kastamonu	Fatma Serap Ekmekci	Justice and Development Party	
Kastamonu	Hasan Baltacı	Republican People's Party	Resignation
Kayseri	Hulusi Akar	Justice and Development Party	
Kayseri	Ayşe Böhürler	Justice and Development Party	
Kayseri	Şaban Çopuroğlu	Justice and Development Party	
Kayseri	Murat Cahid Cıngı	Justice and Development Party	
Kayseri	Sayın Bayar Özsoy	Justice and Development Party	
Kayseri	Aşkın Genç	Republican People's Party	New Party
Kayseri	Mahmut Arıkan	Republican People's Party	Felicity Party
Kayseri	İsmail Özdemir	Nationalist Movement Party	
Kayseri	Mustafa Baki Ersoy	Nationalist Movement Party	
Kayseri	Dursun Ataş	Good Party	Justice and Development Party
Kırıkkale	Mustafa Kaplan	Justice and Development Party	
Kırıkkale	Ahmet Önal	Republican People's Party	Resignation
Kırıkkale	Halil Öztürk	Nationalist Movement Party	
Kırklareli	Vecdi Gündoğdu	Republican People's Party	
Kırklareli	Fahri Özkan	Republican People's Party	New Party
Kırklareli	Ahmet Gökhan Sarıçam	Justice and Development Party	
Kırşehir	Necmettin Erkan	Justice and Development Party	
Kırşehir	Metin İlhan	Republican People's Party	New Party
Kilis	Ahmet Salih Dal	Justice and Development Party	
Kilis	Mustafa Demir	Nationalist Movement Party	Independent
Kocaeli	Sadettin Hülagü	Justice and Development Party	
Kocaeli	Radiye Sezer Katırcıoğlu	Justice and Development Party	
Kocaeli	Veysal Tipioğlu	Justice and Development Party	
Kocaeli	Mehmet Akif Yılmaz	Justice and Development Party	
Kocaeli	Cemil Yaman	Justice and Development Party	
Kocaeli	Sami Çakır	Justice and Development Party	
Kocaeli	Mühip Kanko	Republican People's Party	New Party
Kocaeli	Harun Özgür Yıldızlı	Republican People's Party	New Party
Kocaeli	Hasan Bitmez	Republican People's Party	Death
Kocaeli	Nail Çiler	Republican People's Party	New Party
Kocaeli	Saffet Sancaklı	Nationalist Movement Party	
Kocaeli	Lütfü Türkkan	Good Party	
Kocaeli	Ömer Faruk Gergerlioğlu	Peoples' Equality and Democracy Party	
Kocaeli	Mehmet Aşıla	New Welfare Party	
Konya	Tahir Akyurek	Justice and Development Party	
Konya	Orhan Erdem	Justice and Development Party	
Konya	Selman Özboyacı	Justice and Development Party	
Konya	Meryem Göka	Justice and Development Party	
Konya	Abdullah Ağralı	Justice and Development Party	
Konya	Mehmet Baykan	Justice and Development Party	
Konya	Ziya Altunyıldız	Justice and Development Party	
Konya	Latif Selvi	Justice and Development Party	
Konya	Mustafa Hakkı Özer	Justice and Development Party	
Konya	Barış Bektaş	Republican People's Party	
Konya	Hasan Ekici	Republican People's Party	Justice and Development Party
Konya	Mustafa Kalaycı	Nationalist Movement Party	
Konya	Konur Alp Koçak	Nationalist Movement Party	
Konya	Ünal Karaman	Good Party	Justice and Development Party
Konya	Ali Yüksel	New Welfare Party	New Path
Kütahya	Adil Biçer	Justice and Development Party	
Kütahya	İsmail Çağlar Bayırcı	Justice and Development Party	
Kütahya	Mehmet Demir	Justice and Development Party	
Kütahya	Ali Fazıl Kasap	Republican People's Party	New Path
Kütahya	Ahmet Erbaş	Nationalist Movement Party	
Malatya	Bülent Tüfenkci	Justice and Development Party	
Malatya	İhsan Koca	Justice and Development Party	
Malatya	İnanç Siraç Kara Ölmeztoprak	Justice and Development Party	
Malatya	Abdurrahman Babacan	Justice and Development Party	
Malatya	Veli Ağbaba	Republican People's Party	New Party
Malatya	Mehmet Celal Fendoğlu	Nationalist Movement Party	
Manisa	Bahadır Yenişehirlioğlu	Justice and Development Party	
Manisa	Murat Baybatur	Justice and Development Party	
Manisa	Tamer Akkal	Justice and Development Party	
Manisa	Ahmet Mücahit Arınç	Justice and Development Party	
Manisa	Özgür Özel	Republican People's Party	New Party
Manisa	Ahmet Vehbi Bakırlıoğlu	Republican People's Party	New Party
Manisa	Bekir Başevirgen	Republican People's Party	New Party
Manisa	Selma Aliye Kavaf	Republican People's Party	
Manisa	Erkan Akçay	Nationalist Movement Party	
Manisa	Şenol Sunat	Good Party	
Mardin	Salihe Aydeniz	Peoples' Equality and Democracy Party	
Mardin	Kamuran Tanhan	Peoples' Equality and Democracy Party	
Mardin	Beritan Güneş Altın	Peoples' Equality and Democracy Party	
Mardin	George Aslan	Peoples' Equality and Democracy Party	
Mardin	Faruk Kılınç	Justice and Development Party	
Mardin	Muhammed Adak	Justice and Development Party	
Mersin	Ali Mahir Başarır	Republican People's Party	New Party
Mersin	Gülcan Kış	Republican People's Party	
Mersin	Mehmet Emin Ekmen	Republican People's Party	New Path
Mersin	Talat Dinçer	Republican People's Party	New Party
Mersin	Hasan Ufuk Çakır	Republican People's Party	Justice and Development Party
Mersin	Nureddin Nebati	Justice and Development Party	
Mersin	Ali Kıratlı	Justice and Development Party	
Mersin	Havva Sibel Söylemez	Justice and Development Party	
Mersin	Faruk Dinç	Justice and Development Party	Free Cause Party
Mersin	Levent Uysal	Nationalist Movement Party	
Mersin	Burhanettin Kocamaz	Good Party	
Mersin	Ali Bozan	Peoples' Equality and Democracy Party	
Mersin	Perihan Koca	Peoples' Equality and Democracy Party	
Muğla	Cumhur Uzun	Republican People's Party	New Party
Muğla	Gizem Özcan	Republican People's Party	New Party
Muğla	Süreyya Öneş Derici	Republican People's Party	New Party
Muğla	Selçuk Özdağ	Republican People's Party	New Path
Muğla	Kadem Mete	Justice and Development Party	
Muğla	Yakup Otgöz	Justice and Development Party	
Muğla	Metin Ergün	Good Party	
Muş	Sezai Temelli	Peoples' Equality and Democracy Party	
Muş	Sümeyye Boz	Peoples' Equality and Democracy Party	
Muş	Mehmet Emin Şimşek	Justice and Development Party	
Nevşehir	Süleyman Özgün	Justice and Development Party	
Nevşehir	Emre Çalışkan	Justice and Development Party	
Nevşehir	Filiz Kılıç	Nationalist Movement Party	
Niğde	Cevahir Uzkurt	Justice and Development Party	
Niğde	Ömer Fethi Gürer	Republican People's Party	
Niğde	Cumali İnce	Nationalist Movement Party	
Ordu	Mahmut Ozer	Justice and Development Party	
Ordu	İbrahim Ufuk Kaynak	Justice and Development Party	
Ordu	Mustafa Hamarat	Justice and Development Party	
Ordu	Seyit Torun	Republican People's Party	New Party
Ordu	Mustafa Adıgüzel	Republican People's Party	
Ordu	Naci Şanlıtürk	Nationalist Movement Party	
Osmaniye	Derya Yanik	Justice and Development Party	
Osmaniye	Seydi Gülsoy	Justice and Development Party	
Osmaniye	Asu Kaya	Republican People's Party	New Party
Osmaniye	Devlet Bahceli	Nationalist Movement Party	
Rize	Muhammed Avcı	Justice and Development Party	
Rize	Harun Mertoğlu	Justice and Development Party	
Rize	Tahsin Ocaklı	Republican People's Party	New Party
Sakarya	Lütfi Bayraktar	Justice and Development Party	
Sakarya	Çiğdem Erdoğan Atabek	Justice and Development Party	
Sakarya	Ali İnci	Justice and Development Party	
Sakarya	Ertuğrul Kocacık	Justice and Development Party	
Sakarya	Murat Kaya	Justice and Development Party	
Sakarya	Ayça Taşkent	Republican People's Party	New Party
Sakarya	Muhammet Levent Bülbül	Nationalist Movement Party	
Sakarya	Ümit Dikbayır	Good Party	Independent
Samsun	Mehmet Muş	Justice and Development Party	
Samsun	Çiğdem Karaaslan	Justice and Development Party	
Samsun	Yusuf Ziya Yılmaz	Justice and Development Party	
Samsun	Orhan Kırcalı	Justice and Development Party	
Samsun	Ersan Aksu	Justice and Development Party	
Samsun	Murat Çan	Republican People's Party	New Party
Samsun	Mehmet Karaman	Republican People's Party	New Path
Samsun	İlyas Topsakal	Nationalist Movement Party	
Samsun	Erhan Usta	Good Party	
Siirt	Tuncer Bakirhan	Peoples' Equality and Democracy Party	
Siirt	Sabahat Erdoğan Sarıtaş	Peoples' Equality and Democracy Party	
Siirt	Mervan Gül	Justice and Development Party	
Sinop	Nazım Maviş	Justice and Development Party	
Sinop	Barış Karadeniz	Republican People's Party	New Party
Sivas	Abdullah Güler	Justice and Development Party	
Sivas	Hakan Aksu	Justice and Development Party	
Sivas	Rukiye Toy	Justice and Development Party	
Sivas	Ulaş Karasu	Republican People's Party	New Party
Sivas	Ahmet Özyürek	Nationalist Movement Party	
Şanlıurfa	Bekir Bozdag	Justice and Development Party	
Şanlıurfa	Abdulkadir Emin Önen	Justice and Development Party	
Şanlıurfa	Abdürrahim Dusak	Justice and Development Party	
Şanlıurfa	Mehmet Ali Cevheri	Justice and Development Party	
Şanlıurfa	Cevahir Asuman Yazmacı	Justice and Development Party	
Şanlıurfa	İbrahim Eyyüpoğlu	Justice and Development Party	
Şanlıurfa	Hikmet Başak	Justice and Development Party	
Şanlıurfa	Mehmet Faruk Pınarbaşı	Justice and Development Party	
Şanlıurfa	Mithat Sancar	Peoples' Equality and Democracy Party	
Şanlıurfa	Ömer Öcalan	Peoples' Equality and Democracy Party	
Şanlıurfa	Dilan Kunt Ayan	Peoples' Equality and Democracy Party	
Şanlıurfa	Ferit Şenyaşar	Peoples' Equality and Democracy Party	
Şanlıurfa	Mahmut Tanal	Republican People's Party	New Party
Şanlıurfa	İbrahim Özyavuz	Nationalist Movement Party	
Şırnak	Newroz Uysal Aslan	Peoples' Equality and Democracy Party	
Şırnak	Mehmet Zeki İrmez	Peoples' Equality and Democracy Party	
Şırnak	Aysegul Dogan	Peoples' Equality and Democracy Party	
Şırnak	Arslan Tatar	Justice and Development Party	
Tekirdağ	Faik Öztrak	Republican People's Party	
Tekirdağ	İlhami Özcan Aygun	Republican People's Party	
Tekirdağ	Cem Avşar	Republican People's Party	
Tekirdağ	Nurten Yontar	Republican People's Party	
Tekirdağ	Mestan Özcan	Justice and Development Party	
Tekirdağ	Gökhan Diktaş	Justice and Development Party	
Tekirdağ	Çiğdem Koncagül	Justice and Development Party	
Tekirdağ	Selcan Hamşıoğlu	Good Party	
Tokat	Yusuf Beyazıt	Justice and Development Party	
Tokat	Mustafa Arslan	Justice and Development Party	
Tokat	Cüneyt Aldemir	Justice and Development Party	
Tokat	Kadim Durmaz	Republican People's Party	
Tokat	Yücel Bulut	Nationalist Movement Party	
Trabzon	Adil Karaismailoğlu	Justice and Development Party	
Trabzon	Mustafa Şen	Justice and Development Party	
Trabzon	Yılmaz Büyükaydın	Justice and Development Party	
Trabzon	Vehbi Koç	Justice and Development Party	
Trabzon	Sibel Suiçmez	Republican People's Party	New Party
Trabzon	Yavuz Aydın	Good Party	
Tunceli	Ayten Kordu	Peoples' Equality and Democracy Party	
Uşak	İsmail Güneş	Justice and Development Party	
Uşak	Fahrettin Tuğrul	Justice and Development Party	
Uşak	Ali Karaoba	Republican People's Party	
Van	Pervin Buldan	Peoples' Equality and Democracy Party	
Van	Zülküf Uçar	Peoples' Equality and Democracy Party	
Van	Gülcan Kaçmaz Sayyiğit	Peoples' Equality and Democracy Party	
Van	Sinan Çiftyürek	Peoples' Equality and Democracy Party	
Van	Gülderen Varli	Peoples' Equality and Democracy Party	
Van	Mahmut Dindar	Peoples' Equality and Democracy Party	
Van	Burhan Kayatürk	Justice and Development Party	
Van	Kayhan Türkmenoğlu	Justice and Development Party	
Yalova	Ahmet Büyükgümüş	Justice and Development Party	
Yalova	Meliha Akyol	Justice and Development Party	
Yalova	Tahsin Becan	Republican People's Party	
Yozgat	Abdulkadir Akgül	Justice and Development Party	
Yozgat	Süleyman Şahan	Justice and Development Party	
Yozgat	İbrahim Ethem Sedef	Nationalist Movement Party	
Yozgat	Lütfullah Kayalar	Good Party	
Zonguldak	Muammer Avcı	Justice and Development Party	
Zonguldak	Saffet Bozkurt	Justice and Development Party	
Zonguldak	Ahmet Çolakoğlu	Justice and Development Party	
Zonguldak	Deniz Yavuzyılmaz	Republican People's Party	New Party
Zonguldak	Eylem Ertuğ Ertuğrul	Republican People's Party	New Party
