= Kazakhstan through the Eyes of Foreign Media =

Kazakhstani international annual contest

Kazakhstan through the Eyes of Foreign Media is an international annual grand contest organized by the Government of Kazakhstan through the Kazakh Foreign Ministry to promote positive, objective, and creative depictions of Kazakhstan by foreign authors, experts, writers and journalists in various media houses since 2014.

== Overview ==
The competition encourages works from both traditional and digital platforms, including social media, focusing on Culture, Economy, History,CICA, KazAid, IT and Digital Transformation, AI, Cryptocurrency and Tourism.

It is established to encourage foreign authors, experts, writers, journalists, bloggers, and content creators to produce accurate, interesting, and insightful materials about Kazakhstan.

== Format and theme ==
Entries can include articles, videos, podcasts, and social media content published on foreign platforms.

The contest accepts submissions on various topics, such as Economy, International Relations, Culture, Traditions, History, Tourism, CICA, KazAid, IT and Digital Transformation, AI, Cryptocurrency and Modern Society.

== Jury ==
A panel of experts, including representatives from the Kazakh Foreign Ministry, Chief Editors' Club, and other Kazakh government bodies, evaluates the entries.

== Winners of 2014 ==
S.No	Name	Country	Topic
1.	Neil Marks	Guyana	Society
2.	Sibylle Greindl	Belgium	Economy
3.	Norshazlina Nor’azman	Malaysia	Trade
4.	Hussain Ahmad	Qatar	Economy
5.	Svetlana Ostrovskaya	Ukraine	Culture

== Winners of 2015 ==
S.No	Name	Country	Topic
1.	Alo Khodjaev	Uzbekistan	Economy
2.	Bartosz Mendyk	Poland	History
3.	Evelin Armella	Argentina	Travel
4.	Ahmed Abdu Tarabek	Egypt	Society
5.	Marwan Zubaidi	Indonesia	Tourism

== Winners of 2016 ==
S.No	Name	Country	Topic
1.	Marina Nabatnikovav	Russia	Trade
2.	Pauline Gavrilov	France	Energy
3.	Douglas Burton	United States	Education
4.	Mohammad Ghazal	Jordan	Peace
5.	Kürşad Zorlu	Turkey	International Relations

== Winners of 2017 ==
S.No	Name	Country	Topic
1.	Parvana Sultanova	Azerbaijan	
2.	Ilaria Capitanio	Italy	
3.	Joel Lee	South Korea	
4.	Udi Shaham	Israel	
5.	Thomas Taylor	Canada	

== Winners of 2018 ==
S.No	Name	Country	Topic
1.	Gilly Pickup	United Kingdom	History
2.	Sasha Lipovtsev	United States	Tourism
3.	Inderveer Singh	India	History
4.	Ayman Abdelhafez al-Zaban	Jordan	Economy
5.	Editorial team of Uza	Uzbekistan	International Relations

== Winners of 2021 ==
S.No	Name	Country	Topic
1.	Nikolajus Zukovas	Lithuania	Politics
2.	Vladimir Bacisin	Slovenia	Modern Society
3.	Tony Ruprecht	Canada	Kazakhstan
4.	Inga Cernei-Kelner	Canada	Kazakhstan
5.	Tsolmon Bat-Erdene	Mongolia	Tourism

== Winners of 2022 ==
S.No	Name	Country	Topic
1.	Tristan Hughes	United Kingdom	History
2.	Gulbaat Rtskhiladze	Georgia	International Relations
3.	Donovan Mackenzie	Canada	Politics
4.	Sanjay Kumar	South Korea	CICA
5.	Driss Lacoubi	Morocco	International Relations
6.	Emrah Kaya	Turkey	Modern Society
7.	Khalid Almutairi	Kuwait	Tourism

== Winners of 2023 ==
S.No	Name	Country	Topic
1.	Jose Puglisi	Spain	International Relations
2.	Askar Yakubov	Uzbekistan	International Relations
3.	Xuan Nguyen Phan Huong	Vietnam	History
4.	Gosaye Feyissa Nateyi	Ethiopia	
5.	Filippo Tenti	Italy	Tourism
6.	Ravichandran Rajamanickam	Malaysia	Peace and Security
7.	Nargiz Mammadova	Azerbaijan	CICA
8.	Canada Eurasia Chamber of Commerce	Canada	Education

== Winners of 2024 ==
S.No	Name	Country	Topic
1.	Milton Atanazio	Brazil	
2.	Daniela Bricca	Italy	
3.	Elena Kosolapova	Azerbaijan	International Relations
4.	Katsuhiro Asagiri	Japan	
5.	Fatma Megahed	Egypt	SCO
6.	Yolanda Garcia	Spain	Tourism
7.	Alexander Gasyuk	Russia	CICA
8.	Ermek Aktanov	Kyrgyzstan	Sports

== Winners of 2025 ==
S.No	Name	Country	Topic
1.	Muhammad Ali Pasha	Pakistan	IT and Digitalization
2.	Derya Soysal	Belgium	Economy (Cryptocurrency)
3.	Akpanbetova Arukhan	Uzbekistan	Culture, History, and Traditions
4.	Matt Fitzgerald	United States	Sports
5.	Marina Mkrtchyan	Armenia	Tourism
