= Aykut Kaya =

Aykut Kaya may refer to:

- Aykut Kaya (karateka)
- Aykut Kaya (politician)
