= Sumayyah (disambiguation) =

Sumayya was a companion (sahabiyyah) of prophet Muhammad.

Sumayyah is also an Arabic-origin feminine name and may refer to:

== People ==
=== Sumayyah ===
- Sumayyah bint Khayyat (c.550-c.615), first Muslim to become a martyr

=== Sümeyye ===
The Turkish version of Sumayyah.

- Sümeyye Aydoğan (born 1999 Turkish actress, singer and model
- Sümeyye Boyacı (born 2003), Turkish female Paralympic swimmer
- Sümeyye Boz (born 1985), Turkish anthropologist a politician
- Sümeyye Durdu (born 2007), Turkish handball player
- Sümeyye Erdoğan (born 1985), Turkish President Recep Tayyip Erdoğan's daughter
- Sümeyye Manz (born 1989), Turkish-German taekwondo practitioner
- Sümeyye Özcan (Paralympian) (born 1992), Turkish Paralympian athlete and goalball player

== Places ==
- Sumay-ye Beradust District, a district in Urmia County, West Azerbaijan Province, Iran
- Sumay-ye Jonubi Rural District, a rural district in Urmia County, West Azerbaijan Province, Iran
- Sumay-ye Shomali Rural District, a rural district in Sumay-ye Beradust District, Urmia County, West Azerbaijan Province, Iran
