= Sümeyye =

Sümeyye is a common feminine Turkish given name. Notable people with the name include:

- Sümeyye Aydoğan (born 1999), Turkish actress, singer and model
- Sümeyye Boyacı (born 2003), Turkish Paralympic swimmer
- Sümeyye Boz (born 1985), Turkish anthropologist, former municipality worker and politician
- Sümeyye Durdu (born 2007), Turkish women's handballer
- Sümeyye Erdoğan (born 1985), Turkish businesswoman and the daughter of President Recep Tayyip Erdoğan
- Sumeyye Manz (born 1989), German taekwondo practitioner of Turkish descent
- Sümeyye Özcan (Paralympian) (born 1992), Turkish female middle-distance runner and goalball player in the B1 class
- Sümeyye Özcan (footballer) (born 2001), Turkish Liechtensteiner footballer

== See also ==
- Sümeyye Özcan
