= Rabia İlhan =

Turkish lawyer and politician (born 1981)

Member of the Grand National Assembly of Turkey
- Incumbent
- Assumed office 2 June 2023
- Constituency: İstanbul (II)

Personal details
- Born: 1981 (age 44–45) Kastamonu
- Party: Justice and Development Party
- Children: 2
- Education: University of Bremen

Rabia İlhan (born 1981) is a Turkish lawyer and politician. She is an Istanbul MP for the Justice and Development Party in the 28th term of the Grand National Assembly of Turkey.

== Life and career ==
She was born in Kastamonu in 1981. She graduated from Istanbul University Faculty of Law in 2003. She then completed her master's degree in European Union Law at Bremen University and her doctorate in Public Private Partnership Law in the European Union and Turkey. She ran for Istanbul MP in the June 2015 Turkish general election. She served as the Head of the Electoral Affairs Unit of the Istanbul Provincial Women's Branch of her party for three years between 2015 and 2018. She served as the Deputy Provincial Chairperson of the AKP Istanbul organization. She has been serving as the Head of the AKP Istanbul Provincial Women's Branch since 2019. İlhan, who was elected as an AKP MP for Istanbul in the elections held on 14 May 2023.

== Parliamentary responsibilities ==
On 14 June 2023 İlhan was elected as a secretary member (kâtip üye) of the Constitutional Commission. She continued to hold this position in the 28th Parliament. She also serves on the Joint Commission composed of members of the Constitutional and Justice Commissions, a Parliamentary body comprising members of the Constitutional and Justice Commission.

== Personal life ==
İlhan is married and has two children.

== See also ==
- 28th Parliament of Turkey
