= Cem Avşar =

Turkish politician and businessman

Cem Avşar MP

Member of the Grand National Assembly
- Incumbent
- Assumed office 2 June 2023
- Constituency: Tekirdağ (2023)

Personal details
- Born: 1988 (age 37–38) Bakırköy, Istanbul, Turkey
- Party: Republican People's Party (2025-present)
- Other political affiliations: Democracy and Progress Party (2020-2025); New Path (2025)
- Education: Anglia Ruskin University
- Occupation: Politician, businessman

Cem Avşar (born 1988) is a Turkish politician and businessman. He is one of the founding members of the Democracy and Progress Party (DEVA). He entered the 28th term of the Grand National Assembly of Turkey as a Tekirdağ deputy.

== Biography ==
Avşar was born in 1988 in Bakırköy, Istanbul. His family is from Malatya. He studied economics in Berlin and at Anglia Ruskin University in Cambridge. He worked in the construction and tourism sector. He made investments in Çerkezköy and Çorlu regions of Tekirdağ. In 2019, he became the president of Cem Foundation.

In 2020, he became one of the founding members of the Democracy and Progress Party (DEVA). He was appointed as the Chief Advisor in the party administration in 2021, and as the Head of Local Governments and Urbanism Policies in the Central Executive Board in 2022.

In the 2023 Turkish general elections, he became a 3rd place deputy candidate from the CHP list within the Nation Alliance quota from Tekirdağ province; he entered the TBMM as a 28th term deputy. On 27 June 2025, he resigned from the DEVA Party. On 23 July 2025, he joined the CHP.
