= Adem Çalkın =

Turkish businessperson and politician

Adem Çalkın MP

Member of the Grand National Assembly
- Incumbent
- Assumed office 2 June 2023
- Constituency: Kars (2023)

Personal details
- Born: February 21, 1981 (age 44); Kars, Turkey
- Political party: Justice and Development Party
- Education: Atatürk University

Adem Çalkın (born February 21, 1981) Turkish businessman and politician. He is the 28th term deputy of the Justice and Development Party (Adalet ve Kalkınma Partisi).

== Biography ==
Between 2012 and 2015, he served in various positions in Kars Provincial Presidency of Justice and Development Party. In 2015, he was elected as AK Party Kars Provincial Chairman.

In 2022, he resigned from his post as provincial chairman and became a parliamentary candidate in the May 2023 Turkish General Elections.

He was elected as the 28th term deputy of the Justice and Development Party, Kars. He served in the TBMM Industry, Trade, Energy, Natural Resources, Information and Technology Commission.
