= Şehzade Demir =

Turkish politician

Member of the Grand National Assembly
- Incumbent
- Assumed office 2 June 2023
- Constituency: Muş (2023–present)

Personal details
- Born: 1 January 1973 (age 53) Korkut, Muş, Turkey
- Party: Green Left Party (YSP) (current) Peoples' Democratic Party (HDP) (former)
- Children: 2
- Education: Ankara University
- Profession: Politician

Şehzade Demir (born 1 January 1973) is a Turkish politician. He is a founding member of the Green Left Party and was elected as a Member of the Grand National Assembly of Turkey for the province of Muş during the 2023 general election.

== Early life and education ==
Şehzade Demir was born on 1 January 1973 in Korkut district of Muş Province. He is of Kurdish ethnicity. Demir graduated from Ankara University.

== Career ==
Demir began his political career with the Pro-Kurdish rights movement. He was a founding member of the Peoples' Democratic Party (Turkish: Halkların Demokratik Partisi, HDP), established in 2012. He held several positions within the HDP, serving as a Provincial Co-chair in Muş and later as a member of the party's Central Executive Committee (MYK).

In the lead-up to the 2023 general election, the HDP, facing the threat of closure by Turkey's Constitutional Court, decided to contest the election under the banner of the Green Left Party (Turkish: Yeşil Sol Parti, YSP). Demir became a founding member of the YSP's parliamentary group. He was placed first on the YSP's candidate list for Muş Province. Demir was elected to the 28th Parliament of Turkey. He is a member of the Green Left Party parliamentary group. Demir serves as a member on the National Education, Culture, Youth and Sports Committee of the parliament.
