= Ekrem Gökay Yüksel =

Turkish politician (born 1981)

Ekrem Gökay Yüksel MP

Member of the Grand National Assembly
- Incumbent
- Assumed office 2 June 2023
- Constituency: Balıkesir (2023)

Personal details
- Born: 1981 (age 43–44); Balıkesir, Turkey
- Political party: Nationalist Movement Party

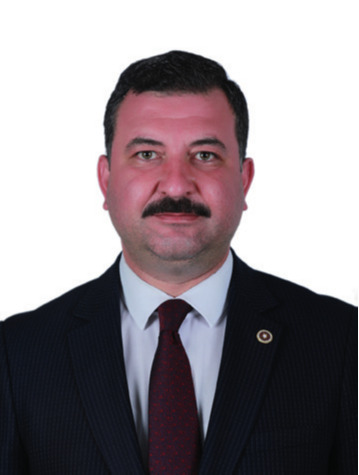
Ekrem Gökay Yüksel

Ekrem Gökay Yüksel (born 1981) is a Turkish politician. He is a Nationalist Movement Party (MHP) Balıkesir deputy in the 28th term of the Grand National Assembly of Turkey.

== Biography ==
He was born in Balıkesir in 1981. He has been interested in politics since his secondary education years. He served as the Balıkesir Chairman of the Grey Wolves for 9 years and as the Balıkesir Provincial Chairman of the Nationalist Movement Party between 2019 and 2023. He left this position to participate in the 2023 elections.

In the 2023 general elections, he participated as MHP 1st place Balıkesir MP candidate. He became Balıkesir MP in the 28th term of the Grand National Assembly of Turkey. He took part in the Environment Commission.
