= Ertuğrul Kaya =

Turkish politician

Member of the Grand National Assembly of Turkey
- Incumbent
- Assumed office 2 June 2023
- Constituency: Samsun (2023–present)

Personal details
- Born: 1 January 1962 (age 64) Samsun, Turkey
- Party: Justice and Development Party (2001–2020); Democracy and Progress Party (2020–present); Felicity Party (2024–2025, parliamentary group); New Path (from 2025)
- Education: Ankara University Faculty of Law
- Profession: Lawyer, Politician

Ertuğrul Kaya (born 1962) is a Turkish politician and a member of the Grand National Assembly of Turkey for the Justice and Development Party. He was elected from the province of Samsun in the 2023 Turkish general election. Kaya entered the 2023 general election as a candidate for the Justice and Development Party in Samsun. The AKP contested the election as the leading party of the People's Alliance. He was successfully elected as a Member of Parliament for the 28th Parliament of Turkey.
