= Gizem Özcan =

Turkish lawyer and politician (born 1990)

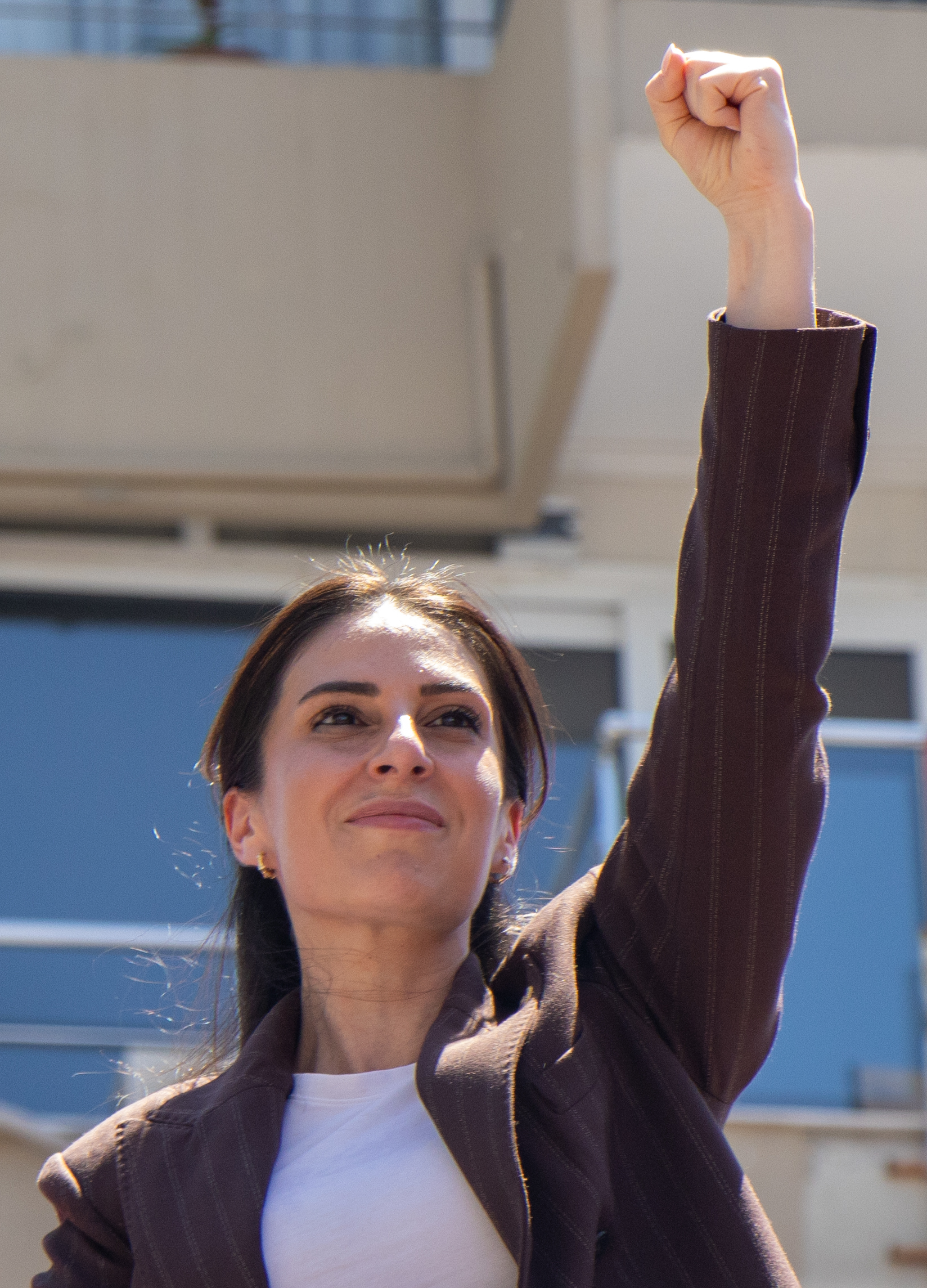
- Özcan in 2026

Member of the Grand National Assembly
- Incumbent
- Assumed office 2 June 2023
- Constituency: Muğla

Personal details
- Born: 10 November 1990 (age 35) Marmaris, Muğla, Turkey
- Party: New Party (since 2026)
- Education: Law
- Alma mater: Başkent University

Gizem Özcan (born 10 November 1990) is a Turkish politician serving as a member of the Grand National Assembly since 2023. She has served as Vice Chairperson in charge of Legal and Election Affairs of the New Party since 2026.

== Politician career ==
Özcan entered politics, and served on the executive board of the Republican People's Party (CHP) Marmaris District Organization in 2015. She represented the party on the district election board and the Human Rights Commission established under the District Governorship. She has been an active member of various civil society organizations. She was elected to the provincial executive board at the 2020 CHP Muğla Provincial Congress, and served as a Provincial vİce Chair. She served as a delegate at the 37th Ordinary Convention. She waselected to the 28th Parliament of Turkey as a Deputy of Muğla by the CHP.

=== New Party ===
In July 2026, she transferred to the New Party (YP) following its establishment. She was elected to the ten-seat Central Executive Board, and became Vice Chairperson in charge of Legal and Election Affairs.

== Personal life ==
Özcan was born to Naciye and İsmet in Marmaris, Muğla, Turkey on 10 November 1990.

She completed her primary and secondary education in her hometown. After graduating from Halıcı Ahmet Urkay Anatolian high school, shefinished her undergraduate studies in the Faculty of Law at Başkent University in Ankara on a scholarship. Following her graduation, she began practicing law.

She is married and has two children.
