= Seda Gören Bölük =

Turkish politician (born 1983)

Seda Gören Bölük (born 1983) is a Turkish politician and member of the Justice and Development Party. She has served as a member of the Grand National Assembly of Turkey since 2023 Turkish parliamentary election representing Istanbul (III).

== Early life and education ==
Gören Bölük was born in Istanbul in 1983. She attended Saint Benoît French High School and studied International Relations in Galatasaray University. She subsequently studied at the Institute of Political studies in Lille as part of the Erasmus programme. She received a Master's degree in European Policies from the Institute of Political Studies in Strasbourg as a Jean Monnet scholar.

== Political career ==
Gören Bölük began her political career as a member of the Esenyurt Municipal Council following the 2009 local election. She subsequently held several positions within AK party's organization including positions in its Women's Branch. In 2015 she was elected to the Central Decision and administrative board of the Ak party woman's branch. She later served in positions related to civil society and public relation and foreign relations. In 2018 she was reelected and was appointed as head of organization of the AK party women's branch.

== Parliament career ==
Gören Bölük was elected to the Grand National Assembly in the 2023 general election as an Ak Party candidate from Istanbul's 3rd electoral district. She has served on the Commission on Equal Opportunities for women and men and as member of the Parliamentary Assembly of the council of Europe. She also chaired the Turkey-France Parliamentary Friendship Group.

== See also ==
- 28th Parliament of Turkey
