= Ali Mahir Başarır =

Turkish politician (born 1974)

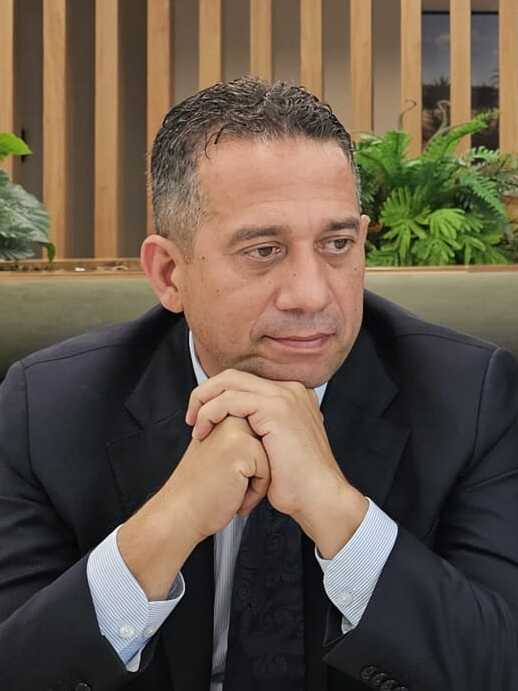
- Başarır, 2024

Deputy Chairman of the Republican People's Party
- Incumbent
- Assumed office 3 June 2023
- Preceded by: Engin Özkoç

Grand National Assembly of Turkey 27th and 28th Term Deputy
- Incumbent
- Assumed office 7 July 2018
- Constituency: 2018 – Mersin; 2023 – Mersin

Personal details
- Born: 3 September 1975 (age 50) Tarsus, Mersin, Turkey
- Party: Republican People's Party
- Spouse: Sebla Öztürk Başarır (m. 2015)
- Children: 2
- Education: Marmara University

Ali Mahir Başarır (born 3 September 1975) is a Turkish politician and lawyer. He is a member of parliament for Mersin from the Republican People's Party.

== Life ==
Ali Mahir Başarır was born on 3 September 1975 in Tarsus, Mersin . Başarır graduated from Marmara University Faculty of Law and completed his master's degree in Public Law at the same university. After graduating from university, he started his business life as a freelance lawyer in Istanbul. Later, he worked as a manager in Maltepe Sports Club and Kartal Sports Club.

After the 1980 Turkish coup d'état, the Republican People's Party was shut down and upon its reopening in 1992, he took part in the Tarsus district organisation and started active political life. Başarır, who was a candidate for Mersin MP for the first time in the 2011 general elections, was elected as Mersin MP in the 24 June 2018 general elections and entered the parliament.

Başarır, a member of Association for the Support of Contemporary Life and Hatay Businessmen and Bureaucrats Association (HATIAB), is married to Sebla Öztürk Başarır and has two children.

== New Party ==
The 38th Ordinary Congress in November 2023 and the 21st Extraordinary Congress in April 2025 of the Republican People's Party (CHP) were ordered by a court to be annulled due to a ruling of "absolute nullity" issued in the lawsuit. As a result of the court order, interim suspension of the elected party leader Özgür Özel and the party leadership occurred, and Kemal Kılıçdaroğlu and the party bodies existing prior to the congress were restored and continued to perform their duties. As the court-appointed leadership did not set an appropriate early new congress date, the founding of a new party became inevitable for a fraction of the party. 91 CHP parliamentarians, among them Başarır, resigned from their party, and founded the New Party on 24 July 2026.
