= Derya Ayaydın =

Turkish politician (born 1988)

Member of the Grand National Assembly of Turkey
- Incumbent
- Assumed office 14 May 2023
- Constituency: Istanbul II

Personal details
- Born: 1988 (age 37–38)
- Party: Justice and Development Party

Derya Ayaydın (born 1988) is a Turkish politician from the Justice and Development Party who was elected to the Grand National Assembly of Turkey from Istanbul II in the 2023 Turkish parliamentary election.

She is the daughter of Aydın Ayaydın, who was a member of Parliament between 1999–2002 and 2011–15.
