= Faruk Aytek =

Turkish engineer and politician

Member of the Grand National Assembly of Turkey
- Incumbent
- Assumed office 7 July 2018
- Constituency: Ankara

Personal details
- Party: Nationalist Movement Party
- Education: Gazi University
- Occupation: Politician, engineer

Faruk Aytek is a Turkish engineer and politician who has served as a Member of Parliament (MP) in the Grand National Assembly of Turkey since 2018.

== Career ==
Aytek was first elected as an MP for Ankara in the 2018 Turkish general election, representing the Nationalist Movement Party (MHP). He was re-elected for a second term in the 2023 Turkish general election.

Aytek is a graduate of Gazi University's Faculty of Engineering and Architecture.
