= Dursun Ataş =

Turkish soldier and politician

Dursun Ataş MP

Member of the Grand National Assembly
- Incumbent
- Assumed office 7 July 2018
- Constituency: Kayseri (2018, 2023)

Mayor of Pınarbaşı
- In office 2009–2018

Personal details
- Born: 1 October 1966 (age 59) Pınarbaşı, Kayseri, Turkey
- Party: Justice and Development Party (2024-present)
- Other political affiliations: Nationalist Movement Party (2009-2017); Good Party (2017-2024)
- Education: Turkish Air NCO Higher Vocational School
- Occupation: Politician, soldier

Dursun Ataş (1 October 1966, Pınarbaşı, Kayseri, Turkey) is a Turkish soldier and politician.

== Biography ==
In 1987, he graduated from the Air Technical School as an Air Petty Officer and started his duty, after serving 20 years at various levels of the Turkish Air Force, he retired in 2007 and worked as a manager in the family company between 2007 and 2009. Between 2009 and 2018, he served as Mayor of Pınarbaşı Municipality, resigned from MHP in 2017 and joined İYİ Party. In the 2018 general elections in Turkey, he resigned from the mayor's office to become a parliamentary candidate. He is a 27th term Kayseri MP. In the 2019 local elections, he ran for the mayorship of Kayseri Metropolitan Municipality as a joint candidate of the Nation Alliance. He is married and has three children. He is a 28th term Kayseri MP. He resigned from the Good Party with the statement he made. He joined the Justice and Development Party on October 30, 2024.
