= Faruk Dinç =

Turkish politician and lawyer

Member of the Grand National Assembly of Turkey
- Incumbent
- Assumed office 7 July 2018
- Constituency: Samsun (2018–present)

Personal details
- Born: 2 March 1987 (age 39) Bafra, Samsun, Turkey
- Party: Republican People's Party (CHP)
- Education: Ankara University Bilkent University
- Profession: Lawyer, Politician

Faruk Dinç (born 2 March 1987) is a Turkish politician, lawyer, and a member of the Grand National Assembly of Turkey for the opposition Republican People's Party. He was first elected from the province of Samsun in the 2018 general election.

== Early life and education ==
Faruk Dinç was born on 2 March 1987 in the Bafra district of Samsun Province. He completed his primary and secondary education in Bafra. Dinç then attended Ankara University, graduating from the Faculty of Law. He subsequently earned a Master of Laws (LL.M.) degree from Bilkent University.

== Career ==
Before entering politics, Dinç worked as a lawyer. He is a member of the Ankara Bar Association. Dinç began his political career with the Republican People's Party. He has served in various capacities within the party's youth and local organizations. He was first elected as a Member of Parliament for Samsun in the 2018 Turkish general election. He was re-elected for a second term in the 2023 Turkish general election. He serves as a member of the Justice Committee in the parliament. He has previously served on the Planning and Budget Committee.

== Controversy ==
In February 2025, Dinç attracted public attention and criticism for remarks made during a press conference at the Grand National Assembly. As an MP for the Islamist HÜDA PAR party, he called on the Turkish state to block access to the social media platform TikTok, which he described as a national security threat and a cause of "moral erosion." In his statement, Dinç specifically targeted LGBTI+ people, using the term "deviants" while arguing the platform broadcast "propaganda of LGBT deviants" and "obscene content." Linking his demand to the government's declaration of 2025 as the "Year of the Family," Dinç stated it was the state's duty to protect youth and the family structure from such platforms, which he claimed distracted youth from national civilizational values.
