= Zeynep Oduncu =

Turkish politician (born 1987)

Zeynep Oduncu (born 1987, Gerçüs, Turkey) is a former Kurdish politician of the Democratic Regions Party (DBP) and the Democratic People's Party (HDP). Since June 2023, she is a member of the Grand National Assembly of Turkey for the Peoples' Equality and Democracy Party (DEM Party).

== Early life and education ==
Zeynep Oduncu was born 1 January 1989 in Gercüş, where she also attended high school.

== Political career ==
Since 2014, Zeynep Oduncu became a co-mayor of Gercüs, alongside Abdülkerim Kaya. In September 2015 she was shortly detained together with several other politicians of the DBP politicians in Batman. In November 2016, she was dismissed from the Municipal Council of Gerçüs by the Ministry of the Interior. The same month and the next the police raided her house in Gerçüs. In December 2016 Oduncu and her co-mayor Abdulkerim Kaya were detained and a trustee was appointed to the Gerçüs municipality. In May 2022, she was shortly detained within a group of women politicians of the HDP. In the electoral campaign towards the elections of 2023, she emphasized the importance of a solution to the Kurdish question, that Kurds do not want to be felt marginalized due to their identity. On an other side, she also focused on health and environmental issues. In the parliamentary elections of May 2023, she was elected to the Grand National Assembly of Turkey representing Batman for the YSP.
