= Burhanettin Bulut =

Turkish politician (born 1970)

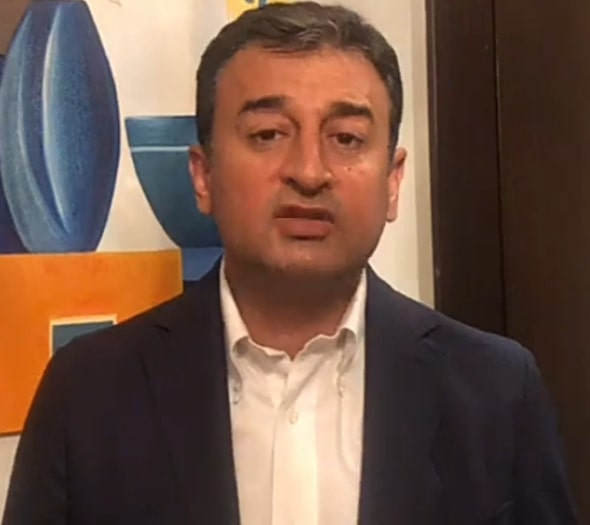
- Bulut in 2020

Member of the Grand National Assembly
- Incumbent
- Assumed office 7 July 2018
- Constituency: Adana

Personal details
- Born: 25 August 1970 (age 55)
- Party: Republican People's Party

Burhanettin Bulut (born 25 August 1970) is a Turkish politician serving as a member of the Grand National Assembly since 2018. He has served as deputy chairman of the Republican People's Party since 2023.

== Early life and career ==
Burhanettin Bulut was born in 1970 in Bitlis. He graduated from the Ege University Faculty of Pharmacy in 1992. In 1993, he opened a pharmacy in Adana and continued working as a pharmacist.

He was a founding member of the executive board of the Çukurova City Council.

== Political career ==
Bulut became active in the provincial and district organizations of the Republican People's Party (CHP) from 1999. In the 30 March 2014 local elections, he was elected as a member of the Çukurova Municipal Council. He resigned from this position after being appointed as the CHP Adana Provincial Chair.

In the 24 June 2018 general election, Bulut was elected as a CHP member of the Grand National Assembly of Turkey. He served on the Grand National Assembly's Health, Family, Labour and Social Affairs Committee.
