= Ayhan Barut =

Turkish businessman and politician

Member of the Grand National Assembly of Turkey
- Incumbent
- Assumed office 7 July 2018
- Constituency: Eskişehir

Personal details
- Party: Republican People's Party
- Education: Anadolu University
- Occupation: Politician, businessman

Ayhan Barut is a Turkish businessman and politician who has served as a member of Parliament (MP) in the Grand National Assembly of Turkey since 2018. Barut was first elected as an MP for Eskişehir in the 2018 Turkish general election, representing the Republican People's Party (CHP). He was re-elected for a second term in the 2023 Turkish general election.

Barut is a graduate of Anadolu University.
