= Sema Silkin Ün =

Turkish civil engineer and politician

Member of the Grand National Assembly of Turkey
- Incumbent
- Assumed office 7 July 2018
- Constituency: Istanbul

Personal details
- Party: HDP
- Education: Anadolu University
- Occupation: Politician, civil engineer

Sema Silkin Ün is a Turkish civil engineer and politician who has served as a Member of Parliament in the Grand National Assembly of Turkey since 2018. Ün was elected as an MP for Istanbul in the 2018 Turkish general election, representing the Peoples' Democratic Party (HDP). She was a candidate for re-election for the HDP from Istanbul in the 2023 Turkish general election. Ün is a graduate of Anadolu University's Faculty of Engineering and Architecture. She has worked as a civil engineer.
