= Eyyüp Kadir İnan =

Turkish politician (born 1993)

Member of the Grand National Assembly
- Incumbent
- Assumed office 2 June 2023
- Constituency: İzmir (II)

Personal details
- Born: 1993 (age 32–33)
- Party: Justice and Development Party

Eyyüp Kadir İnan (born 1993) is a Turkish politician serving as a member of the Grand National Assembly since 2023. He has served as secretary general of the Justice and Development Party since 2025. From 2021 to 2025, he served as chairman of the Justice and Development Party Youth.

== Biography ==
İnan was born in Konak in 1993. He studied political science and public administration at Gediz University. He then received a master's degree in political science and international relations at Bahçeşehir University.

== Career ==
İnan began his political career in 2010, as a member of the Izmir provincial executive board of the Justice and Development Party AKP youth branches. He subsequently served as the Izmir Youth Branches vice president responsible for universities and election affairs, and as a member of the central decision and executive board (MKYK) of the party's Grand National Assembly during this period. From 2018-2021, İnan served as chairman of AK party's Youth Branches its 6th Ordinary Congress. He held this position until 27 January 2025, when he handed over the chairmanship at the 7th Ordinary Congress.

In the 2023 general election, İnan was elected as an AK Party member of parliament for İzmir. He became a member of the 28th parliament and has participated in parliamentary proceedings and committee work including discissions concerning the establishment of Family and Youth Fund.

At the AK Party's 8th Ordinary Congress on 24 February 2025, Inan was elected to the party's MKYK and subsequently appointed general secretary. He has continued to serve as the party's general secretary while representing Izmir in the Grand National Assembly.

== Personal life ==
Inan is married and has two children.
