= Deniz Yavuzyılmaz =

Turkish politician (born 1979)

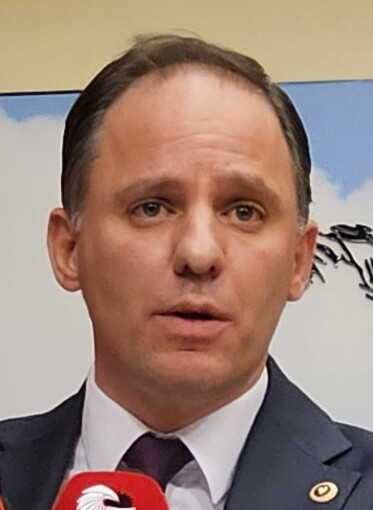
- Yavuzyılmaz in 2024

Member of the Grand National Assembly
- Incumbent
- Assumed office 7 July 2018
- Constituency: Zonguldak

Personal details
- Born: 15 June 1979 (age 46)
- Party: Republican People's Party

Deniz Yavuzyılmaz (born 15 June 1979) is a Turkish politician serving as a member of the Grand National Assembly since 2018. He has served as deputy chairman of the Republican People's Party since 2023.
