= Yunus Emre (politician) =

Turkish politician (born 1982)

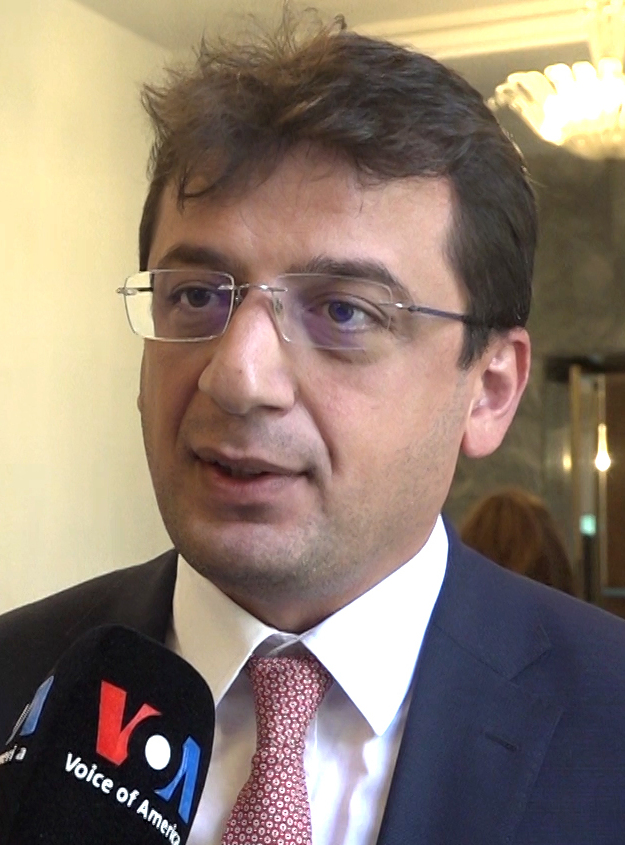
- Emre in 2023

Member of the Grand National Assembly
- Incumbent
- Assumed office 7 July 2018
- Constituency: Istanbul

Personal details
- Born: 1982 (age 43–44)
- Party: New Party (since 2026)

Yunus Emre (born 1982) is a Turkish politician serving as a member of the Grand National Assembly since the year 2018. He has served as secretary general of the New Party since 2026.
