= Ulaş Karasu =

Turkish politician (born 1980)

Member of the Grand National Assembly
- Incumbent
- Assumed office 7 July 2018
- Constituency: Sivas

Personal details
- Born: 1980 (age 45–46)
- Party: Republican People's Party

Ulaş Karasu (born 1980) is a Turkish politician serving as a member of the Grand National Assembly since 2018. He has served as deputy chairman of the Republican People's Party since 2023.
