= İdris Şahin =

Turkish politician

İdris Şahin MP

Member of the Grand National Assembly
- Incumbent
- Assumed office 2 June 2023
- In office 28 June 2011 – 15 April 2015

Personal details
- Party: Justice and Development Party (2002–2019); Democracy and Progress Party (2020–present); New Path (from 2025)

İdris Şahin (born 1964) is a Turkish politician and a member of the Grand National Assembly of Turkey for the New Welfare Party. He was elected to represent the province of Samsun during the 2023 Turkish general election.
