= İsa Mesih Şahin =

Turkish politician

Member of the Grand National Assembly of Turkey
- Incumbent
- Assumed office 7 July 2018
- Constituency: Mardin

Personal details
- Party: Justice and Development Party (2003–2019 ; from 2026)
- Other political affiliations: Future Party (2019–2025); Felicity Party (2023–2025, parliamentary group); New Path (2025)
- Occupation: Politician

İsa Mesih Şahin is a Turkish politician who has served as a member of Parliament in the Grand National Assembly of Turkey since 2018. Şahin was first elected as an MP for Mardin in the 2018 Turkish general election, representing the Justice and Development Party. He was re-elected for a second term in the 2023 Turkish general election.
