= Aykut Kaya (politician) =

Turkish politician

Aykut Kaya is a Turkish politician from the Good Party. In the 2023 Turkish parliamentary election, he was elected to the Grand National Assembly from Antalya. Aykut Kaya was born in Kayseri in 1978. He completed his primary and secondary education in Manavgat district of Antalya. He completed his higher education by graduating from the Business Administration Department at Anadolu University. On May 31, 2024, he announced his resignation from Good Party. On June 4, 2024, he joined the CHP.

== See also ==
- 28th Parliament of Turkey
