= Adem Yıldırım =

Turkish politician (born 1973)

Adem Yıldırım (born 1973) is a Turkish politician from the Justice and Development Party who was elected to the Grand National Assembly of Turkey from Istanbul in the 2023 Turkish parliamentary election.
