= Ahmet Zenbilci =

Turkish politician (born 1966)

Ahmet Zenbilci MP

Member of the Grand National Assembly from Adana
- Incumbent
- Assumed office 7 July 2018
- Constituency: Adana (2018, 2023)

Personal details
- Born: 1 October 1966 (age 58); Adana, Turkey
- Political party: Justice and Development Party (AKP) (2004-2024); Independent (2024-present)

Ahmet Zenbilci (born 1 October 1966 in Adana, Turkey) is a Turkish politician and member of the Turkish Parliament. He is a deputy for Adana. He announced his resignation from his party on 30 September 2024.
