= Mehmet Emin Ekmen =

Turkish politician

Member of the Grand National Assembly of Turkey
- Incumbent
- Assumed office 2 June 2023
- Constituency: Ankara
- In office 23 July 2007 – 23 April 2011

Personal details
- Party: Justice and Development Party (2001–2020); Democracy and Progress Party (2020–present); New Path (from 2025)
- Occupation: Politician

Mehmet Emin Ekmen is a Turkish politician who has served as a Member of Parliament in the Grand National Assembly of Turkey since 2018. Ekmen was first elected as an MP for Ankara in the 2018 Turkish general election, representing the İYİ Party. He was re-elected for a second term in the 2023 Turkish general election.
