= Medeni Yılmaz =

Turkish politician

Member of the Grand National Assembly of Turkey
- Incumbent
- Assumed office 2 June 2023
- Constituency: Istanbul (III)
- In office 14 November June 2002 – 23 April 2011
- Constituency: Muş

Personal details
- Born: July 6, 1954 (age 72) Muş
- Party: Justice and Development Party (2001–2020); Democracy and Progress Party (2020–present); New Path (from 2025)
- Occupation: Politician

Medeni Yılmaz is a Turkish politician who has served as a Member of Parliament in the Grand National Assembly of Turkey. Yılmaz was elected as an MP for Istanbul (III) in the 2023 Turkish general election. He was a member of the Justice and Development Party.
