= Levent Uysal =

Turkish businessman, entrepreneur and politician

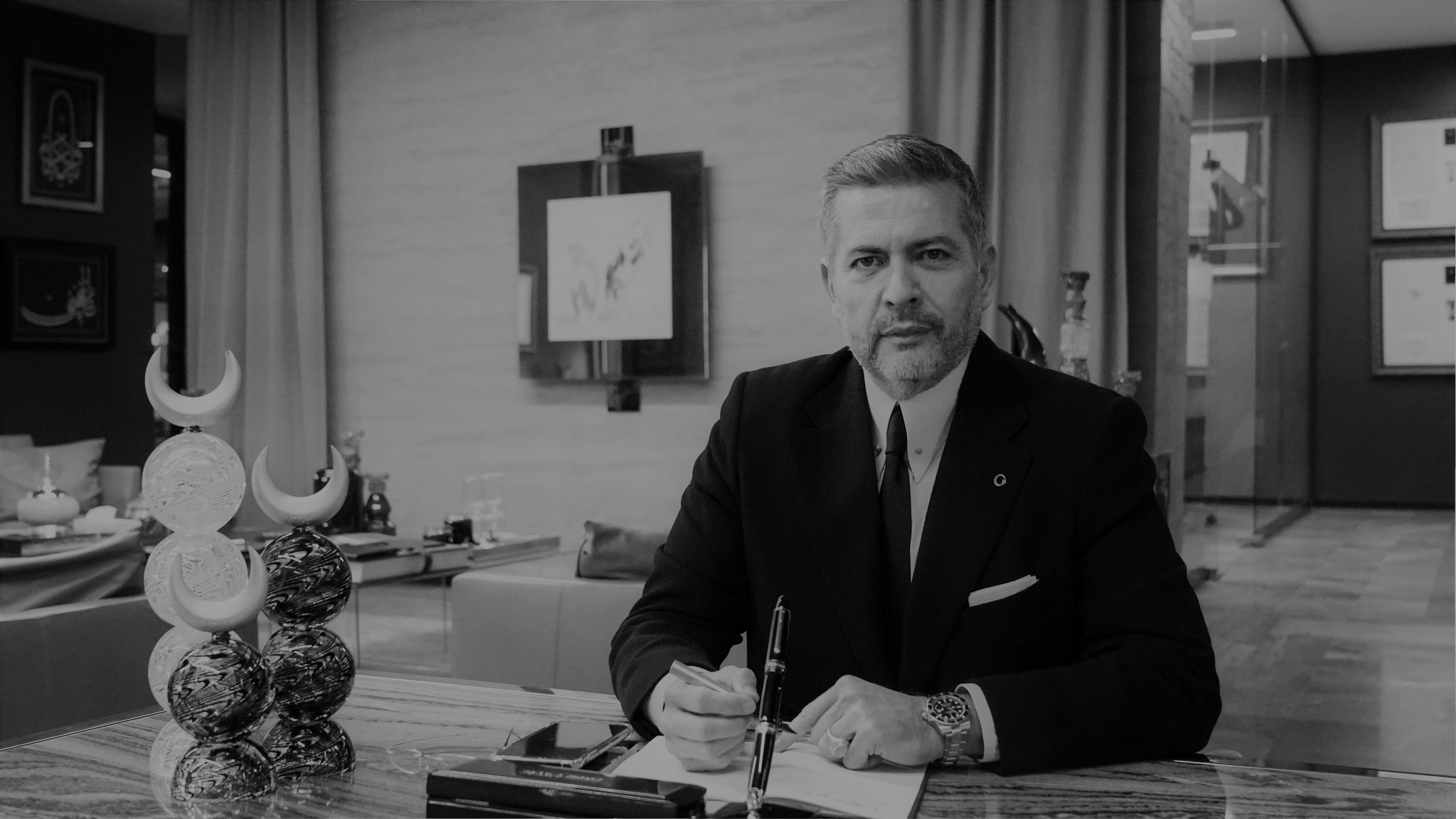
- Born: 1969 (age 56–57); Atlanta
- Citizenship: Turkey
- Years active: 2010-present
- Political party: MHP

Levent Uysal (born 1969, Atlanta) is a Turkish businessman, entrepreneur and politician. He is a 28th term MHP Mersin deputy of the Grand National Assembly of Turkey.
