= Gamze Taşcıer =

Turkish pharmacist and politician

Gamze Taşcıer (born 10 December 1982) is a Turkish pharmacist and politician from the Republican People's Party.

She represents Ankara (I) in the Grand National Assembly of Turkey.
