= Orhan Sümer =

Turkish academic and politician

Member of the Grand National Assembly of Turkey
- Incumbent
- Assumed office 7 July 2018
- Constituency: Tokat

Personal details
- Party: Justice and Development Party (Turkey)
- Education: Gazi University
- Occupation: Politician, academic

Orhan Sümer is a Turkish academic and politician who has served as a Member of Parliament (MP) in the Grand National Assembly of Turkey since 2018. Sümer was first elected as an MP for Tokat in the 2018 Turkish general election, representing the Justice and Development Party (AK Party). He was re-elected for a second term in the 2023 Turkish general election. Sümer is a graduate of Gazi University's Faculty of Education. He worked as an academic, serving as a faculty member and later as the Dean of the Faculty of Education at Gaziosmanpaşa University.
