= Nurhayat Altaca Kayışoğlu =

Turkish lawyer and politician (born 1978)

Member of the Grand National Assembly
- Incumbent
- Assumed office 7 June 2015
- Constituency: Bursa

Personal details
- Born: Nurhayat Altaca; 10 November 1978 (age 47) Pertek, Tunceli, Turkey
- Party: New Party (since 2026)
- Other political affiliations: 2005–2010 Social Democratic People's Party (SHP); 2010–2026 Republican People's Party (CHP)
- Education: Law (Ankara University, Law School); Political science and International relations (Selçuk University)

Nurhayat Altaca Kayışoğlu (born 10 November 1978) is a Turkish lawyer and politician. She worked as a freelance lawyer. Later, she entered politics, and was elected to the parliament. She was a member of the Republican People's Party (CHP) before she transferred to the New Party (YP).

== Lawyer career ==
In 2001, Altaca Kayışoğlu started working as a freelance lawyer registered with the Bursa Bar Association. In 2006, she was elected to the Board of Directors of the Bursa Bar Association as its youngest member, and served for two terms. She served as a human rights educator for the Union of Turkish Bar Associations, and was active in numerous civil society organizations.

== Politician career ==
Altaca Kayışoğlu entered politics joining the Social Democratic People's Party (SHP). In 2005, she was elected as a member of the SHP Provincial Executive Board.

She joined the Republican People's Party (CHP) when the SHP was dissolved in 2010. At the June 2015 Turkish general election, she won a seat as a Deputy of Bursa in the 25th Parliament of Turkey. During the 26th and 27th terms, she served as a member of the Grand National Assembly of Turkey (TBMM) Constitutional Commission, the Turkish Group of the Parliamentary Assembly of Turkic-Speaking Countries (TURKPA), the European Union Harmonization Commission and as a Clerk Membe of the Bureau of the TBMM. She was also a member of the Party Assembly.

=== New Party ===
In July 2026, she transferred to the New Party (YP) following its establishment. She was elected to the ten-seat Central Executive Board, and became vice president in charge of International Organizations.

== Personal life ==
Altaca Kayışoğlu was born to Çiçek and Hasan Hüseyin in Pertek, Tunceli, eastern Turkey in 1978.

She entered Ankara University Law School at the age of sixteen. She was involved in political activities during her university education. After graduation in 1999, she studied at Selçuk University in Konya, and earned a Master's degree in PPolitical science and International relations.

She is married and has a child.
