= Nimet Özdemir =

Turkish businessperson, entrepreneur and politician (born 1970)

Nimet Özdemir MP

Member of the Grand National Assembly
- Incumbent
- Assumed office 2 June 2023
- Constituency: İstanbul (I) (2023)

Personal details
- Born: 1970 (age 55–56) Develi, Kayseri
- Party: Good Party (2017-2024); Republican People's Party (2024-2026); Justice and Development Party (2026–present)

Nimet Özdemir (b. 1970, Develi, Kayseri), is a Turkish businessperson, entrepreneur and politician. 28th term deputy of the AKP in the Grand National Assembly of Turkey.

In the 2023 Turkish general elections, she became a candidate for the 1st place deputy from Istanbul and she was elected as a deputy of Istanbul in the 28th term of the Grand National Assembly of Turkey.

On July 24, 2024, she resigned from İYİ Party. On October 8, 2024, she joined the CHP. She resigned from the CHP on June 17, 2026 and joined the AKP on June 24, 2026.
