= Seda Kaya Ösen =

Turkish politician

Member of the Grand National Assembly of Turkey
- Incumbent
- Assumed office 2 June 2023
- Constituency: İzmir (I) (2023)

DEVA Party İzmir Provincial President
- In office 12 October 2020 – 16 March 2023
- Preceded by: Mehmet Ali Sarızeybek
- Succeeded by: Egemen Pamukçu (acting); Serap Karaosmanoğlu (officially)

Personal details
- Born: Seda Kaya; 9 September 1979 (age 47) Karşıyaka, İzmir, Turkey
- Party: New Party (2026-present)
- Other political affiliations: Democracy and Progress Party (2020-2025); Republican People's Party (2025-2026)
- Education: American Collegiate Institute; Koç University (Bachelor's degree); İzmir University of Economics (Master's degree)
- Occupation: Politician

Seda Kaya Ösen (born 9 September 1979) is a Turkish politician who has served as a Member of Parliament in the Grand National Assembly of Turkey since 2023. Ösen was elected as an MP for İzmir in the 2023 Turkish general election, representing the Republican People's Party.
