= Murat Bakan =

Turkish politician

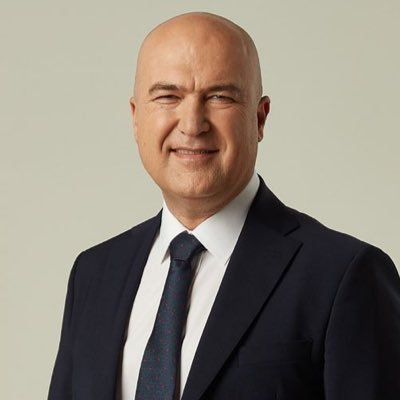

Member of the Grand National Assembly of Turkey
- Incumbent
- Assumed office 1 November 2015
- Constituency: İzmir

Personal details
- Born: 10 January 1972 (age 54) Turkey
- Party: YENİ Party
- Occupation: Politician and lawyer

Murat Bakan (born 10 January 1972, in Ankara) is a Turkish politician and lawyer. He was first elected to the Grand National Assembly of Turkey (TBMM) as a Member of Parliament for İzmir from the Republican People’s Party (CHP) in the 2015 general elections. He served as an İzmir MP during the 26th and 27th legislative terms and continues his service in the 28th term. Throughout his parliamentary tenure, he has been a member of the Committee on Internal Affairs, the Committee on National Defense and the Environment Committee, and has also served as the CHP Spokesperson for the Environment Committee.

At the CHP’s 38th Ordinary Congress held in 2023, he was elected to the Party Assembly and appointed as the Deputy Chairperson responsible for the Ministry of Interior. He was re-elected to the Party Assembly at the CHP’s 39th Ordinary Congress. He served as a member of the TBMM Committee on National Solidarity, Brotherhood and Democracy. Mr. Bakan was currently serving as the Chair of the Internal Affairs Policy Council at the Republican People’s Party (CHP).

Murat Bakan resigned from the Republican People's Party (CHP) and joined the YENİ Party, which was founded on 24 July 2026. He is a member of the Founding Board and the Party Council of the YENİ Party.

== Life and career ==
Murat Bakan was born on 10 January 1972, in Ankara, where his father, a non-commissioned officer, was stationed. He began his primary education at Ankara Bayrak Garrison Primary School and completed his secondary and high school education in İzmir. After graduating from Dokuz Eylül University Faculty of Law, he worked as an independent lawyer alongside his spouse, Selin Ercoşkun Bakan, who is also a lawyer. They have one son, Yiğit Kemal Bakan. Bakan has been actively involved in civil society and has taken part in numerous national and international projects. He served in various roles within city councils, becoming the founding president of the Karabağlar City Council and the first spokesperson of the İzmir City Councils Union. He is also among the founders of the Turkish City Councils Platform. Additionally, as an amateur pilot, he holds flight licenses in the gyrocopter and ultralight categories.

== Political career ==
Murat Bakan has held numerous positions in local government and within the party. Some of his roles include:

• Candidate for Municipal Council Member in the 2004 Local Elections

• Parliamentary Candidate for İzmir’s 2nd District in the 2007 General Elections

• Chair of the İzmir Provincial Election Coordination Board for the 2009 Local Elections

• Founding President of Karabağlar City Council (2009–2013)

• Member of Karabağlar Municipal Council (2009–2014)

• CHP Group Deputy Chairperson in Karabağlar Municipal Council (2010–2012)

• Chair of Karabağlar Municipal Council’s Legal Committee (2009–2013)

• Member of İzmir Metropolitan Municipal Council (2009–2014)

• CHP Group Spokesperson in İzmir Metropolitan Municipal Council (2009–2014)

• Chair of İzmir Metropolitan Municipal Council’s Legal Committee (2012–2014)

• Delegate of CHP’s 32nd Ordinary Congress

• Member of the Technical Bylaw Committee for CHP’s 16th Extraordinary Congress

• Congress Officer responsible for the Presidency Council at the 17th and 18th Extraordinary Congresses

• Founder, first-term Spokesperson, and Honorary Member of the İzmir City Councils Union

• Founding Member of the Turkish City Councils Platform

Within the TBMM, he has served as a member of the Committee on Internal Affairs and the Committee on National Defense during the 26th term, and as a member of the Environment Committee and the Parliamentary Research Commission on Minimizing the Impacts of Climate Change and Ensuring Efficient Use of Water Resources during the 27th term.

Continuing his parliamentary duties in the 28th term, Bakan also served as the CHP’s Deputy Chairperson responsible for the Ministry of Interior within the party’s shadow cabinet. He was re-elected to the Party Assembly at the CHP’s 39th Ordinary Congress and served as a member of the TBMM Committee on National Solidarity, Brotherhood and Democracy.

Murat Bakan resigned from the Republican People's Party (CHP) and joined the YENİ Party, which was founded on 24 July 2026. He is a member of the Founding Board and the Party Council of the YENİ Party.
