= Aylin Yaman =

Turkish physician and politician (born 1967)

Member of the Grand National Assembly
- Incumbent
- Assumed office 14 May 2023
- Constituency: Ankara (1st electoral district)

Personal details
- Born: 10 November 1967 (age 58) Ankara, Turkey
- Party: New Party (since 2026)
- Other political affiliations: 2015–2026 Republican People's Party (CHP)
- Education: Medicine
- Alma mater: Ankara University

Aylin Yaman (born 10 November 1967) is a Turkish physician and politician. She worked as a physician and healthcare executive. Later, she entered politics, and became a member of the parliament. She was a member of the Republican People's Party before she transferred to the New Party.

== Physician career ==
In 2000,Yaman started to work as a physician and healthcare executive joining the management team at Ankara Güven Hospital. After serving as Director of Patient Services, Director of Institutional Services, Quality Coordinator, and Deputy Chief Physician, she held the position of Chief Physician from 2008 to 2013. She became the General Manager of Güven Hospital in 2013. In 2018, she joined the executive board of Güven Health Group, subsequently serving as the chair of the executive board from 2019 to 2020. She was honored with the "Most Successful Healthcare Executive of the Year" award by Hospital Manager Magazine in 2015, and the "Most Efficient Hospital Administrator of the Year" award by the Turkish Industrialists and Businessmen Foundation in 2017.

== Politician career ==
In 2015, Yaman entered politics joining the Republican People's Party (CHP). She ran for a seat in the parliament at the 2018 Turkish general election. She was elected as a member of the Party Assembly at the 37th Ordinary Congress of the CHP held in 2020. She has served on the COVID-19 Advisory Board, the Human Rights Working Group, the Science Platform's Elderly Policies Group, the Ankara Provincial Health Board, the Sports Board's Scientific Committee, and the Çankaya Tradesmen Desk. She contributed to the organization of the Health Forum, as well as workshops on social policies for the elderly, policies for persons with disabilities, and policies for children. Her areas of interest include health policies, international hospital accreditation systems, elderly care systems and centers, human resources in healthcare, insurance systems, health tourism, and medical device management systems. At the 2023 Turkish general election held on 14 May, she was elected as Deputy of Ankara (1st electoral district) for the CHP to the Grand National Assembly. In June 2023, she was elected as a member of the Central Executive Board, and was appointed Vice Chairperson in charge of Social Policies.

=== New Party ===
In July 2026, she transferred to the New Party (YP) following its establishment. She was elected to the ten-seat Central Executive Board, and became vice president in charge of Public Relations.

== Personal life ==
Yaman was born to Gülsüm and Hızır in Ankara on 10 November 1967.

She completed her primary education at Çankaya Primary School and her middle and high school education at TED Ankara College. In 1985, she entered Ankara University Faculty of Medicine, and graduated in 1991. She completed her specialization in the Department of Physiology at the same faculty in 1996.

She worked as a research assistant in the Department of Physiology at the same university, and became a specialist in physiology in 1996. During her time as a research assistant, she went to the United States in 1995, and spent three months as an observer in the Department of Hematology at Wayne State University in Detroit, Michigan.

She is married, and has two children.
