= Selim Temurci =

Turkish politician

Member of the Grand National Assembly of Turkey
- Incumbent
- Assumed office 14 May 2023
- Constituency: Istanbul

Personal details
- Party: Independent
- Occupation: Politician

Selim Temurci is a Turkish politician who has served as a member of parliament in the Grand National Assembly of Turkey since 2023. Temurci was elected as an MP for Istanbul in the 2023 Turkish general election, and currently independent since 2025.
