= Hasan Karal =

Turkish politician (born 1965)

Member of the Grand National Assembly of Turkey
- Incumbent
- Assumed office 2 June 2023
- Constituency: Samsun (2023–present)

Personal details
- Born: 1965 (age 60–61) Samsun, Turkey
- Party: Justice and Development Party (2001–2020); Democracy and Progress Party (2020–present); New Path (from 2025)
- Education: Gazi University
- Occupation: Politician, Public Administrator

Hasan Karal is a Turkish politician and a member of the Grand National Assembly of Turkey for the Justice and Development Party. He was elected from the province of Samsun in the 2023 Turkish general election. Karal was elected during 2023 Turkish general election as a candidate for the Justice and Development Party representing Samsun a Member of Parliament. He serves a member of the Planning and Budget Committee.
