= Deniz Yücel (politician) =

Turkish politician and lawyer

Deniz Yücel MP
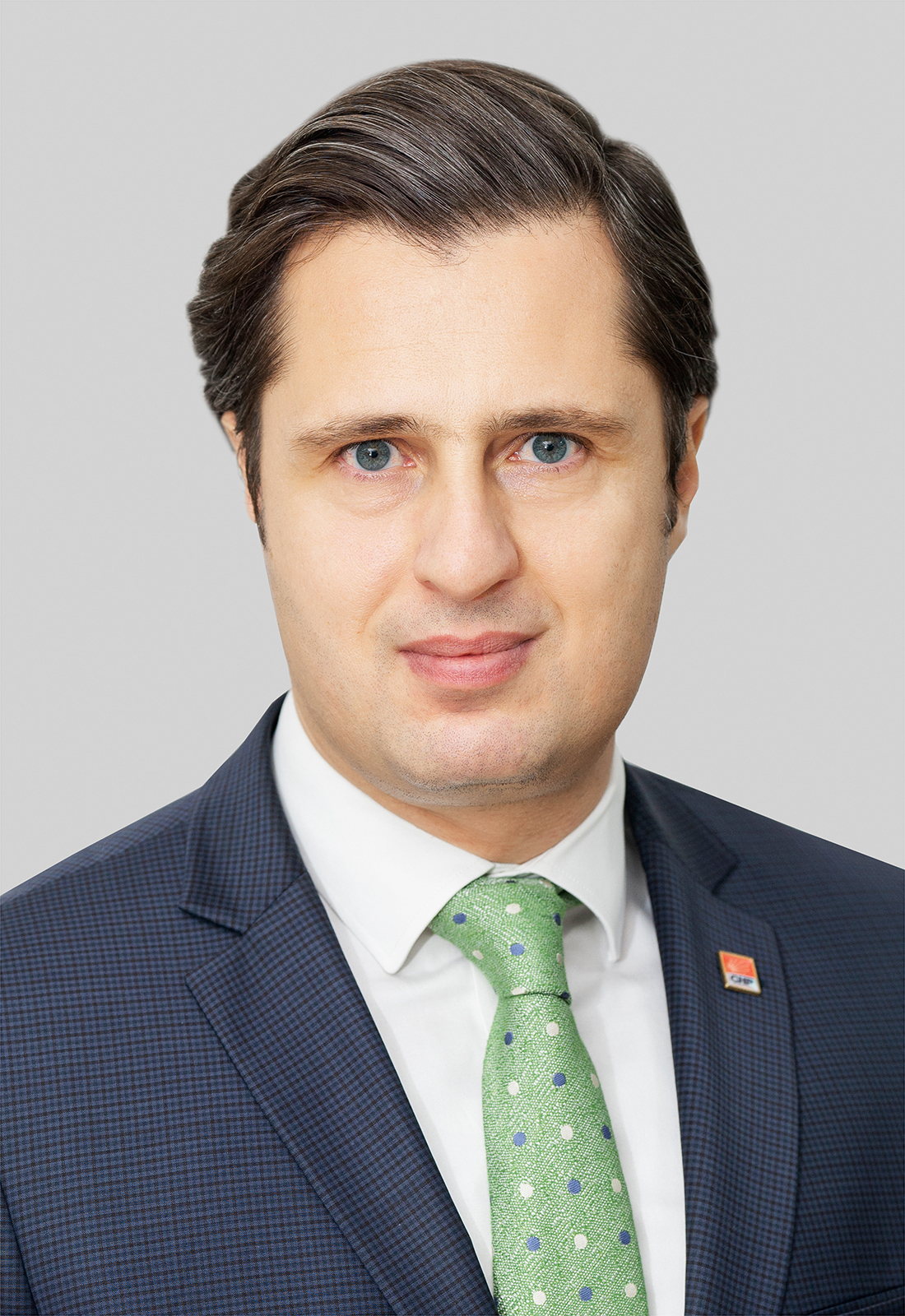

Spokesperson of the Republican People's Party
- Incumbent
- Assumed office 11 November 2023
- Leader: Özgür Özel
- Preceded by: Faik Öztrak

Member of the Grand National Assembly
- Incumbent
- Assumed office 2 June 2023
- Constituency: İzmir (II) (2023)

Personal details
- Born: 12 October 1977 (age 48) İzmir, Turkey
- Party: Republican People's Party (1999–present)
- Education: Dokuz Eylül University
- Occupation: Politician, lawyer

Deniz Yücel (born 12 October 1977, İzmir, Turkey) is a Turkish politician and lawyer.

== Biography ==
Deniz Yücel was born on 12 October 1977 in Izmir. His father Esen Yücel is a lawyer. He graduated from Izmir Atatürk High School in 1995 and Dokuz Eylül University Faculty of Law in 2000. In 2001, he registered with the Izmir Bar Association and started working as a freelance lawyer.

Yücel joined the Republican People's Party in 1999. After the 2014 local elections in Turkey, he entered the Izmir Metropolitan Municipality Assembly from Buca and became CHP group spokesperson. He was elected provincial chairman at the CHP Izmir provincial congresses held on January 7, 2018, and February 8, 2020. On December 26, 2022, he resigned as provincial chairman to run for parliament. In the 2023 general elections in Turkey, he was elected as an MP from Izmir 2nd district. On May 25, 2023, he received his deputy mandate and took office.

== New Party ==
The 38th Ordinary Congress in November 2023 and the 21st Extraordinary Congress in April 2025 of the Republican People's Party (CHP) were ordered by a court to be annulled due to a ruling of "absolute nullity" issued in the lawsuit. As a result of the court order, interim suspension of the elected party leader Özgür Özel and the party leadership occurred, and Kemal Kılıçdaroğlu and the party bodies existing prior to the congress were restored and continued to perform their duties. As the court-appointed leadership did not set an appropriate early new congress date, the founding of a new party became inevitable for a fraction of the party. 91 CHP parliamentarians, among them Yücel, resigned from their party, and founded the New Party on 24 July 2026.

== Personal life ==
Yücel is married to Gönenç Bilgen Yücel and has two children. He speaks English fluently.
