= Burak Dalgın =

Turkish politician

Member of the Grand National Assembly of Turkey
- Incumbent
- Assumed office 2 June 2023
- Constituency: Balıkesir (2023–present)

Personal details
- Born: Bursa, Turkey
- Party: Democracy and Progress Party (2020–2025); Independent (2025–2026); Good Party (2026–present)
- Education: Boğaziçi University
- Profession: Mechanical engineer, manager, politician

Burak Dalgın is a Turkish politician who has served as a member of the Grand National Assembly of Turkey since 2023. He was elected in 2023 as a member of the Democracy and Progress Party running on Republican People's Party's list.

== Early life and career ==
Burak Dalgın attended Boğaziçi University, where he studied mechanical engineering and graduated in 1999. Later between year 2002 to 2004, he went to Boston and obtained his master's degree in business administration at Harvard Business School in Boston.

Dalgın began his political career with the Democracy and Progress Party, found by Ali Babacan, serving as its deputy chairman. He was first elected to the parliament in the 2023 general election, representing the province of Balıkesir. In early 2026, Dalgın resigned from the Democracy and Progress Party and later joined Good Party.

== Controversy ==
=== Parliamentary question drafted by AI ===
In June 2024, it was discovered that Burak Dalgın parliamentary questions he submitted to the minister of industry and technology was prepared using the artificial intelligence, ChatGPT. In a subsequent interview, Dalgın defended the use of ChatGPT, stating that AI is a critical tool for the future and that his action was intended to practically demonstrate the technology's potential in the legislative process. He argued that the focus should remain on the substantive policy questions raised in the motion, rather than the tool used to draft them.
