= Adalet Kaya =

Turkish politician

Adalet Kaya (1977, Kulp, Turkey) is the president of the Rosa Women's Organization and a politician for the Peoples' Equality and Democracy Party (DEM Party). She was elected to the Grand National Assembly of Turkey in the parliamentary elections of May 2023.

== Early life and education ==
Adalet Kaya was born in 1977 in Kulp in the Province of Diyarbakir into a family of five siblings. Her father was a driver between Diyarbakir and Kulp and her mother was a housewife. The family had a small garden and also held some cattle. She was raised in Kulp where she also attended secondary school. By 1993, following street protests and a conflict with the Kurdish Hezbollah, she and her relatives was forced to move to Diyarbakir. There she attended the Fatih high school before she began studying economics at the Ankara University in 1995. She graduated in 2000 and is pleased with her received education, which according to her does not compare to the education provided today.

== Professional life ==
Following her graduation, Adalet Kaya received work at the Ministry of National Education after passing the Public Personnel Selection Exam. She served as a parliamentary advisor for two terms. Following the local election of 2014, she was employed in the municipally of Mardin. There she was involved in establishing a higher number of women employees through the zipper system. After the municipality was seized by a trustee and the mayor dismissed in 2016, Adalet Kaya was also dismissed. She then moved back to her families house in Diyarbakir. In Diyarbakir she established the Rosa Women's Organization after the lifting of the state of emergency in December 2018.

=== Prosecution ===
Between May and August 2020 she was arrested due to an investigation into the activities of the Rosa Women's Organization. According to a secret witness, the organization was established to recruit members for the Kurdistan Workers' Party (PKK).

== Political life ==
In the parliamentary elections of May 2023, Adalet Kaya was elected to the Grand National Assembly of Turkey, representing Diyarbakir for the YSP.
