= Barış Bektaş =

Turkish politician (born 1976)

Barış Mete (born 25 December 1975) is a Turkish politician from the Republican People's Party who has been a Deputy for Konya in the Grand National Assembly of Turkey since 2023. He was born in Seydişehir.

== Life ==
Barış Bektaş was born in Seydişehir in 1976. He completed his primary school education in Seydişehir Ortakaraören and his secondary and high school education at Meram Anatolian High School. In 1999, he graduated from Istanbul University Faculty of Law. He started to work as a freelance lawyer affiliated to Konya Bar Association.

== Political life ==
He served as the Selçuklu District Chairman of the Republican People's Party and as a member of the Statute Commission at the 35th Ordinary Congress. On January 13, 2018, he was elected as Konya Provincial Chairman of the Republican People's Party.

In the 2023 Turkish General Elections, he resigned as provincial chairman to run for parliamentary candidate. After the election, he was elected as CHP Konya deputy for the 28th term of the Grand National Assembly of Turkey. He took part in the TBMM Constitution Commission.
