= Mustafa Nedim Yamalı =

Turkish politician

Member of the Grand National Assembly of Turkey
- Incumbent
- Assumed office 14 May 2023
- Constituency: İzmir

Personal details
- Party: Justice and Development Party (2003–2019 ; from 2024)
- Other political affiliations: Future Party (2019–2024); Felicity Party (2023–2024, parliamentary group)
- Occupation: Politician

Mustafa Nedim Yamalı is a Turkish politician who has served as a Member of Parliament in the Grand National Assembly of Turkey since 2023. Yamalı was elected as an MP for İzmir in the 2023 Turkish general election, representing the Justice and Development Party (AK Party).
