= Ensar Aytekin =

Turkish financial advisor and politician (born 1972)

- Incumbent
- Assumed office 24 June 2018
- Constituency: Balıkesir

Personal details
- Born: 7 April 1972 (age 54) Çıldır, Ardahan, Turkey
- Party: New Party (since 2026)

Ensar Aytekin (born 7 April 1972) is a Turkish politician and former financial advisor. He has served as a member of the Grand National Assembly for Balıkesir since 2018, initially for the Republican People's Party before transferring to the New Party in 2026.

== Politician career ==
Aytekin served as Deputy of Balıkesir for the Republican People's Party (CHP) from 2018.

=== New Party ===
In July 2026, he transferred to the New Party (YP) following its establishment. He was elected to the ten-seat Central Executive Board, and was appointed Vice Chairman in charge of Organisations.[2]

== Personal life ==
Aytekin was born in Çıldır, Ardahan, Turkey on 7 April 1972. He completed primary and secondary education in Ardahan. After graduating from Kars Commercial High School, he completed his studies at the Faculty of Economics at Anadolu University.
