= Ali Bozan =

Turkish lawyer

Ali Bozan (born 1978, in Adiyaman, Turkey) is a lawyer and politician. He is a former politician of the Democratic Society Party (DTP) and since June 2023, a member of the Grand National Assembly of Turkey representing the Green Left Party (YSP).

== Early life and education ==
Ali Bozan was born in Adiyaman in 1978 and moved with his family to Mersin in 1984. He attended primary school and high school in Mersin. Following he studied law at the Dokuz Eylül University in Izmir.

== Professional career ==
Ali Bozan became a member of the Mersin Bar association and his defendants include journalists of the newspaper Evrensel or Aysel Tugluk, a politician of the Peoples' Democratic Party (HDP) whom he represents in the Kobani trial.

== Political career ==
In 2006 he became the head of the Mersin branch of the DTP. The same year, he was charged with terrorist propaganda for having attended a funeral of militants of the Kurdistan Workers' Party (PKK) and deemed the Turkish police officers who kill children terrorists. In 2006 he was arrested for two months and later released pending trial. As a result of the closure case of the DTP that concluded in 2009, Bozan was banned from political office for five years. Bozan eventually began to serve his prison sentence due to the terror related charge of 2006 in 2010. He was released in 2012.

Ali Bozan eventually appealed to the European Court of Human Rights (ECHR), which in 2020 ruled that there was a violation article 10 of the European convention of Human Rights regarding freedom of speech and Turkey was condemned to pay a penalty of 6'€500 to Bozan. In October 2017 he was arrested for a few days together with other layers from the Mersin Bar Association. He was investigated for terror related charges over the possession of a book about Kurds in Rojava by Fehim Tastekin. In the parliamentary elections of May 2023, Ali Bozan was elected to the Grand National Assembly of Turkey representing the YSP for Mersin.
