= Sunay Karamık =

Turkish politician

Member of the Grand National Assembly of Turkey
- Incumbent
- Assumed office 14 May 2023
- Constituency: Manisa

Personal details
- Party: Justice and Development Party (Turkey)
- Occupation: Politician

Sunay Karamık is a Turkish politician who has served as a Member of Parliament in the Grand National Assembly of Turkey since 2023. Karamık was elected as an MP for Manisa in the 2023 Turkish general election, representing the Justice and Development Party (AK Party).
