= Evrim Rızvanoğlu =

Turkish politician

Member of the Grand National Assembly of Turkey
- Incumbent
- Assumed office 2 June 2023
- Constituency: Istanbul (III)

Member of the Planning and Budget Committee

Personal details
- Party: New Party (from 2026)
- Other political affiliations: Democracy and Progress Party (2020–2025); Republican People's Party (2025–2026)
- Occupation: Politician, sociologist

Evrim Rızvanoğlu is a Turkish politician who has served as a Member of Parliament in the Grand National Assembly of Turkey.

== Career ==
She currently serves as a member of the Equality of Opportunity for Women and Men Committee in the Parliament of Turkey.
