= Ali Fazıl Kasap =

Turkish politician and physician (born 1965)

Member of the Grand National Assembly of Turkey
- Incumbent
- Assumed office 8 July 2018

Personal details
- Party: Republican People's Party (from 2015)
- Other political affiliations: Felicity Party (2025, parliamentary group); New Path (from 2026, parliamentary group)

Ali Fazıl Kasap (born 3 June 1965) is a Turkish politician and physician. He is a member of the Grand National Assembly of Turkey since 2018.

== Life and career ==
He was born on February 1, 1965, in Şeyhler, in Emet district of Kütahya. He completed his primary and secondary education in Kütahya. Kasap graduated from the Dokuz Eylül University Faculty of Medicine.

In the 2018 Turkish general election, Kasap was elected to the Grand National Assembly of Turkey. He is representing Kütahya as a CHP member. He was reelected in 2023. After Hasan Bitmez died and Felicity and Future Alliance parliamentary group was briefly collapsed due to parliamentary rules, he switched parties as the will of the CHP. After Felicity and Future Alliance ended and formed the New Path (which has a large number of MPs), Kasap returned to CHP.
