= Ahmet Ersagun Yücel =

Turkish politician (born 1972)

Ahmet Ersagun Yücel MP

Member of the Grand National Assembly
- Incumbent
- Assumed office 2 June 2023
- Constituency: İstanbul (I) (2023)

Personal details
- Born: 1972 (age 53–54) Osmaniye, Turkey
- Party: Good Party (2017-2024); Justice and Development Party (2024-present)
- Education: Yıldız Technical University

Ahmet Ersagun Yücel (1972, Osmaniye, Turkey) is a Turkish politician. He is one of the founding members of the Good Party in 2017. In the 2023 general elections in Turkey, he was elected Istanbul deputy.

== Biography ==
He was born in 1972 in Osmaniye. After completing his university education at Yıldız Technical University, Faculty of Fine Arts, Serigraphy Department, he went to the US. She studied advertising and marketing at New York University; he completed his master's degree in business administration and marketing at Newport University in California.

From 1995 to 1998 he worked as a manager at Rifle Jeans and Calvin Klein Jeans textile companies. In 1999, he became the general manager of TAV Airports. In 2002, he was appointed as the general secretary of TAV Holding and in 2009 as a member of the board of directors of TAV Airports. In 2017, he resigned from TAV Holding after taking part in the establishment of the İyi Party.

After the 2019 local elections, he worked as the general manager of İZBELCOM (Izmir Municipality Environmental Protection Improvement Consultancy and Project Services Company) and then he became the general manager of İZDOĞA A.Ş. After serving as the general manager of this company for four years, he resigned from this position to run for parliamentary candidate in the 2023 Turkish general elections.

== Political career ==
He is one of the founding members of the Good Party in 2017. He served as a member of the party's General Advisory Board and Vice President.

In the 2023 Turkish General Elections, he became the 6th place deputy candidate from the Republican People's Party list from the National Alliance quota in Istanbul 1st electoral district. He entered the 28th term as an MP in the TBMM. He served as a member of the European Union Harmonisation Commission in the Parliament.
