= Cemalettin Kani Torun =

Turkish medical doctor and politician

- In office 14 May 2023 – 14 May 2028
- Constituency: Bursa

Personal details
- Born: 5 July 1959 (age 67) Ardanuç, Artvin, Turkey
- Party: Future Party
- Education: Cerrahpaşa Faculty of Medicine
- Occupation: Politician, medical doctor

Cemalettin Kani Torun (born 1959, Ardanuç) is a Turkish medical doctor, ambassador, and politician.

He graduated from Bursa Erkek Lisesi and the Cerrahpaşa Faculty of Medicine at Istanbul University. After completing his medical education, he worked as a physician in various provinces of Turkey. In 1996, he went to the United Kingdom to conduct research and became one of the founding members of the volunteer organization Doctors Worldwide (Yeryüzü Doktorları). After serving in leadership positions within the organization for 13 years, he was appointed as the Ambassador of Turkey to Somalia in 2011 and held this post until 2014.

In 2014, he was appointed Chief Advisor to the Prime Minister and served in this role until the 2015 general elections. In the 2015 parliamentary elections, he was elected as a Member of Parliament for Bursa from the Justice and Development Party (AK Party) and served as Deputy Chair of the Foreign Affairs Commission in the Grand National Assembly of Turkey.

He did not apply for candidacy in the June 2018 general elections.

In 2019, he became one of the founding members of the Future Party (Gelecek Partisi). In the 2023 general elections, he was elected again as a Member of Parliament for Bursa representing the Future Party. He currently continues his work as a member of the Turkish delegation to the Parliamentary Assembly of the Council of Europe.

He is married and has five children.
