= Serkan Sarı =

Turkish politician

Member of the Grand National Assembly of Turkey
- Incumbent
- Assumed office 14 May 2023
- Constituency: Manisa

Personal details
- Party: Republican People's Party
- Education: Anadolu University
- Occupation: Politician

Serkan Sarı is a Turkish politician who has served as a member of Parliament in the Grand National Assembly of Turkey since 2023. Sarı was elected as an MP for Manisa in the 2023 Turkish general election, representing the Republican People's Party.

Sarı is a graduate of Anadolu University's Faculty of Business Administration.
