= Özgür Karabat =

Turkish politician (born 1974)

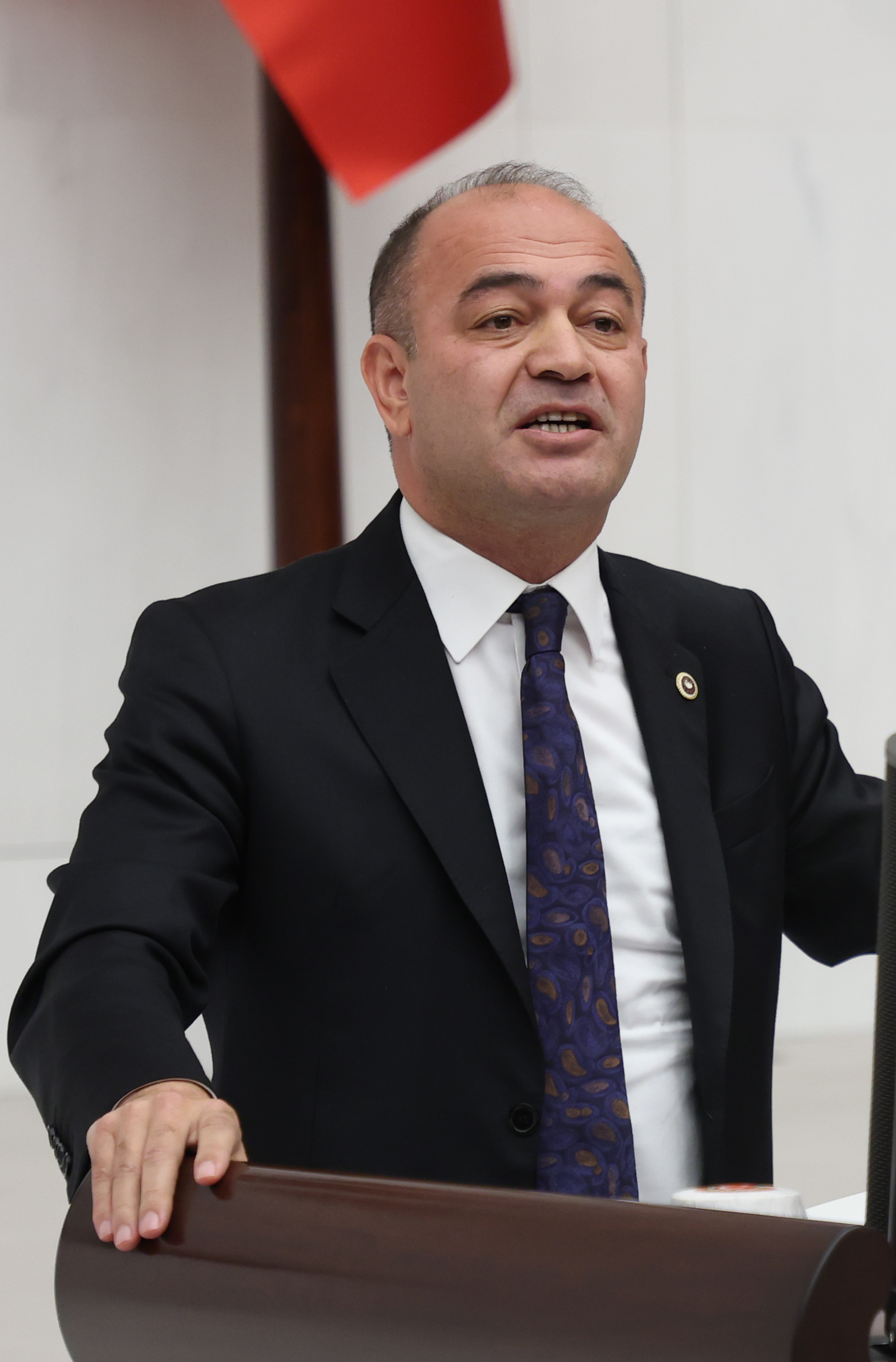
- Karabat in 2024

Member of the Grand National Assembly
- Incumbent
- Assumed office 7 July 2018
- Constituency: Istanbul

Personal details
- Born: 1 May 1974 (age 52)
- Party: Republican People's Party

Özgür Karabat (born 1 May 1974) is a Turkish politician serving as a member of the Grand National Assembly since 2018. He has served as deputy chairman of the Republican People's Party since 2023. In July 2026 he left the Republican People's Party. He is a founding member of the New Party.
