= İrfan Karatutlu =

Turkish politician

Member of the Grand National Assembly of Turkey
- Incumbent
- Assumed office 2 June 2023
- Constituency: İzmir

Personal details
- Party: Justice and Development Party (until 2020 ; from 2026)
- Other political affiliations: Democracy and Progress Party (2020–2026); New Path (2025–2026)
- Occupation: Politician

İrfan Karatutlu is a Turkish politician who has served as a Member of Parliament in the Grand National Assembly of Turkey since 2023. Karatutlu was elected as an MP for İzmir in the 2023 Turkish general election, representing the Justice and Development Party.
