= Elif Esen =

Turkish politician

Member of the Grand National Assembly of Turkey
- Incumbent
- Assumed office 2 June 2023
- Constituency: Muğla (2023–present)

Personal details
- Born: 1981 (age 44–45)
- Party: Democracy and Progress Party (2020–present); New Path (from 2025)
- Education: Dokuz Eylül University
- Occupation: Politician, Craftsman

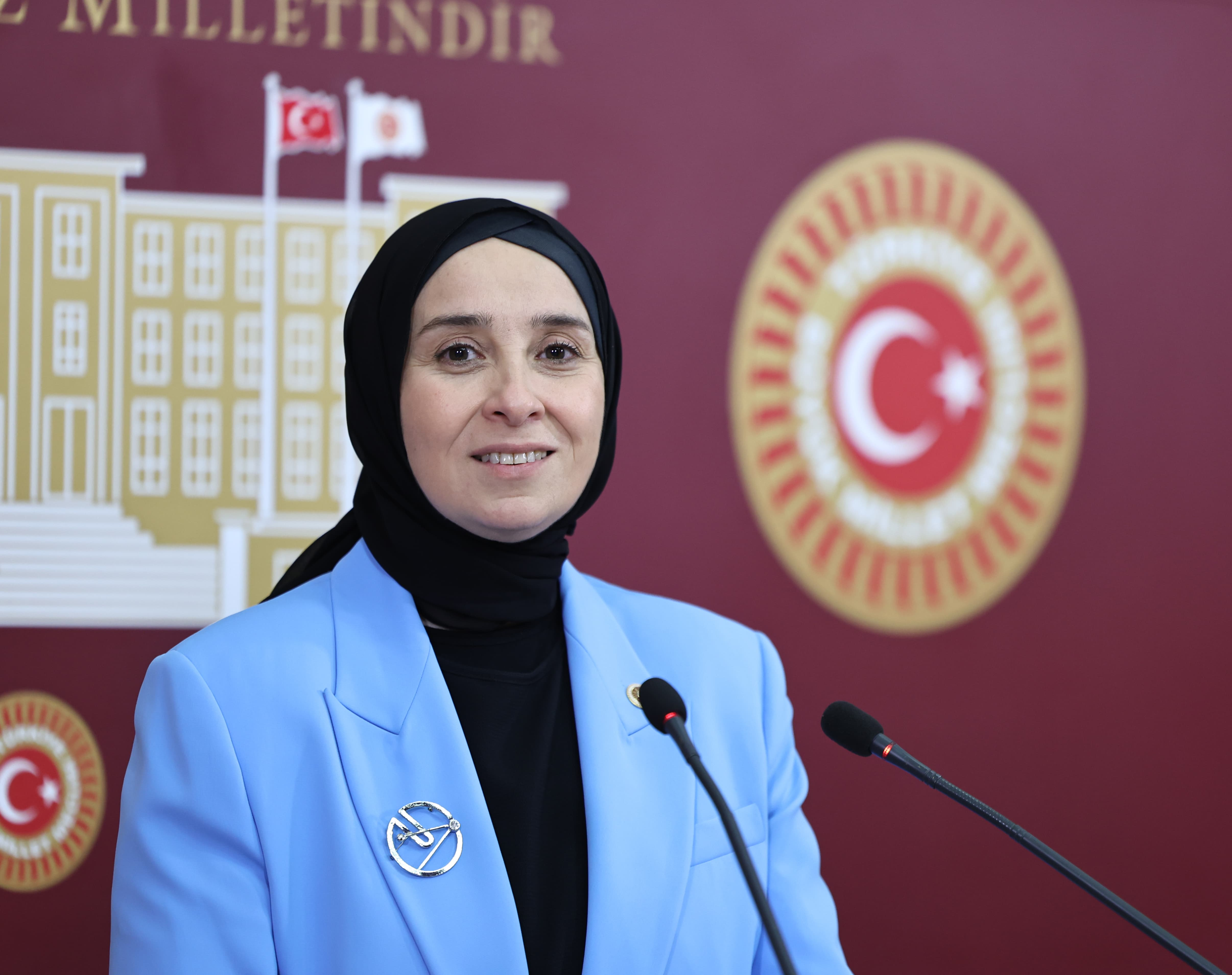

Elif Esen is a Turkish politician and a member of the Grand National Assembly of Turkey for the main opposition Republican People's Party. She was elected from the province of Muğla during the 2023 Turkish general election. Esen serves on the National Education, Culture, Youth and Sports Committee in the parliament.
