= Doğan Demir =

Turkish politician

Member of the Grand National Assembly of Turkey
- Incumbent
- Assumed office 7 July 2018
- Constituency: İzmir

Personal details
- Born: 1973 (age 52–53) Varto, Muş, Turkey
- Party: New Party (from 2026)
- Other political affiliations: Future Party (2019–2025); Felicity Party (2023–2025, parliamentary group); New Path (2025); Republican People's Party (2025–2026)
- Occupation: Politician

Doğan Demir (born 1973) is a Turkish politician who has served as a member of Parliament in the Grand National Assembly of Turkey since 2018. Demir was first elected as an MP for İzmir in the 2018 Turkish general election, representing the Republican People's Party. He was re-elected for a second term in the 2023 Turkish general election.

== New Party ==
The 38th Ordinary Congress in November 2023 and the 21st Extraordinary Congress in April 2025 of the Republican People's Party (CHP) were ordered by a court to be annulled due to a ruling of "absolute nullity" issued in the lawsuit. As a result of the court order, interim suspension of the elected party leader Özgür Özel and the party leadership occurred, and Kemal Kılıçdaroğlu and the party bodies existing prior to the congress were restored and continued to perform their duties. As the court-appointed leadership did not set an appropriate early new congress date, the founding of a new party became inevitable for a fraction of the party. 91 CHP parliamentarians, among them Demir, resigned from their party, and founded the New Party on 24 July 2026.

== Personal life ==
Demir was born to Derdi and Hüseyin in Varto, Muş, Turkey in 1973.
