= Kürşad Zorlu =

Turkish politician (born 1977)

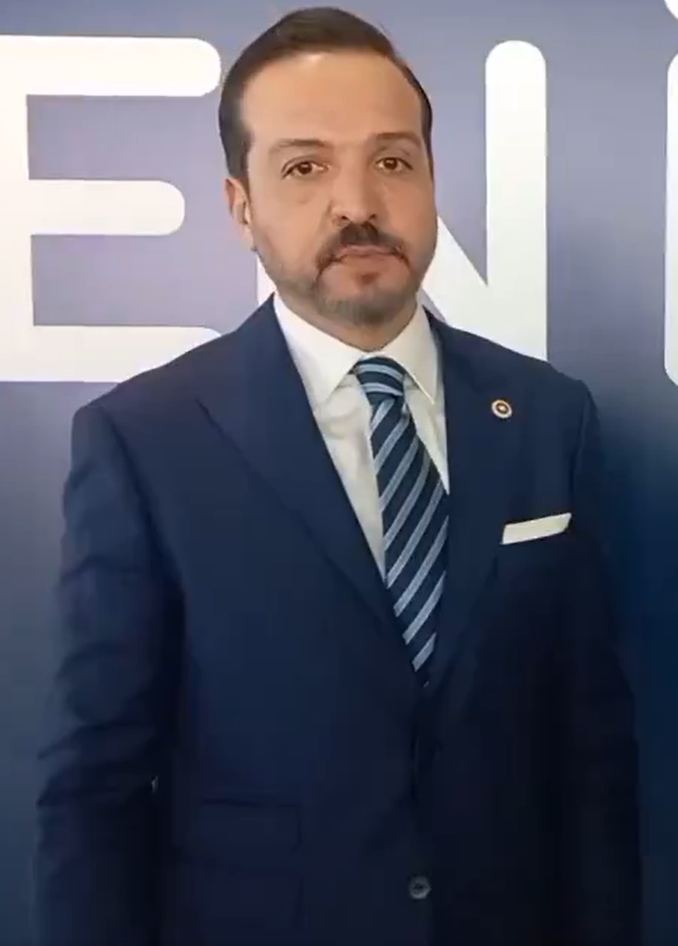
- Zorlu in 2024

Member of the Grand National Assembly
- Incumbent
- Assumed office 2 June 2023
- Constituency: Ankara

Personal details
- Born: 9 April 1977 (age 49)
- Party: Justice and Development Party (since 2025)
- Other political affiliations: Good Party (2022–2025)

Kürşad Zorlu (born 9 April 1977) is a Turkish politician serving as a member of the Grand National Assembly since 2023. From 2022 to 2024, he served as spokesperson of the Good Party.
