= Sümeyye Boz =

Anthropologist

Sümeyye Boz, 2023

Sümeyye Boz (born 1985) is an anthropologist, former municipality worker and a politician of the Green Left Party (YSP). Since June 2023, she is a member of the Grand National Assembly of Turkey, representing Mus for the YSP.

== Early life and education ==
She was born in 1985 and graduated from the Cumhurryet University in Sivas in anthropology and followed up on her studies at the same university taking on studies in social science. In September 2015 she was employed at the Municipality of Ipekyolu, Van as a training coordinator for women's affairs. As such, she was involved in a training course in memory of the International Day for the Elimination of Violence against Women. She was dismissed following a trustee replaced the elected mayor. In 2019, she was the director of youth and sports also in the Municipality of Ipekyolu, but she was dismissed again after the Mayor was replaced with a trustee.

== Political career ==
During her election campaign she focused on the agricultural development of Mus. In the parliamentary elections of May 2023, she was elected into the Grand Assembly of Turkey representing Mus for the (YSP).
