= List of populated places in Sinop Province =

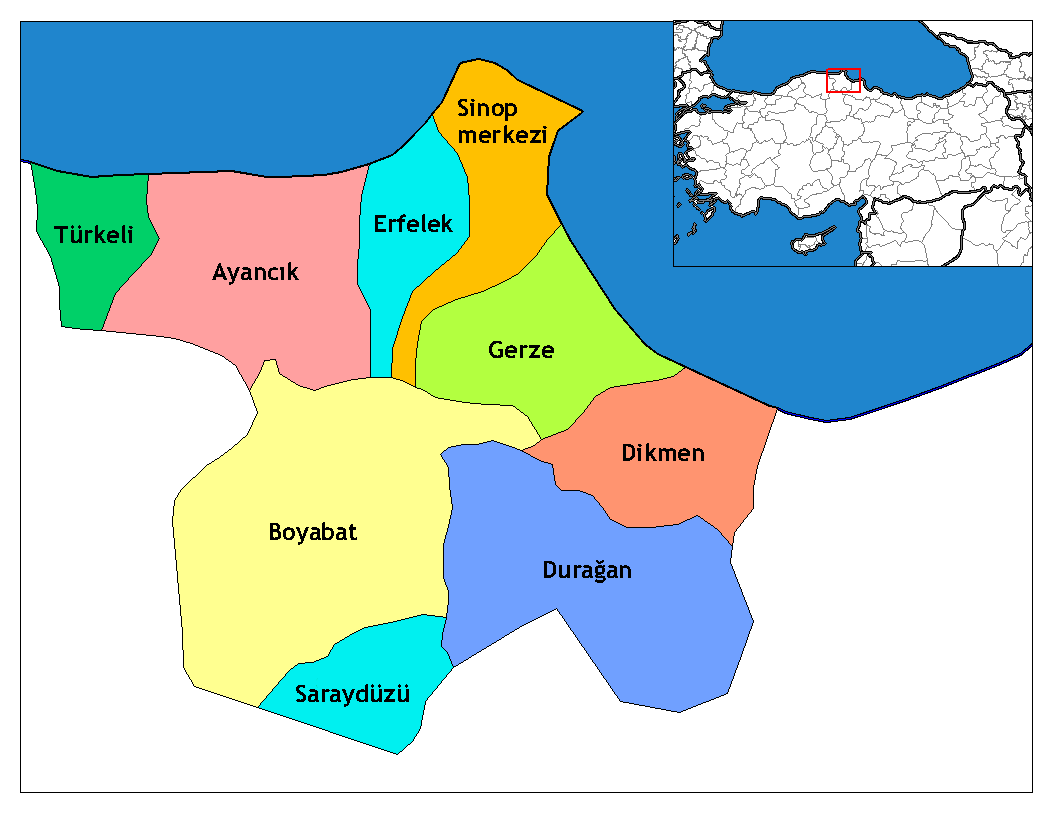
Sinop Province

Below is the list of populated places in Sinop Province, Turkey by the districts. In the following lists first place in each list is the administrative center of the district

== Sinop ==
- Sinop
- Abalı, Sinop
- Ahmetyeri, Sinop
- Akbaş, Sinop
- Alasökü, Sinop
- Aloğlu, Sinop
- Avdan, Sinop
- Bektaşağa, Sinop
- Bostancılı, Sinop
- Çakıldak, Sinop
- Çiftlik, Sinop
- Çobanlar, Sinop
- Demirci, Sinop
- Dibekli, Sinop
- Dizdaroğlu, Sinop
- Erikli, Sinop
- Eymir, Sinop
- Fidanlık, Sinop
- Göller, Sinop
- Göllü, Sinop
- Hacıoğlu, Sinop
- Kabalı, Sinop
- Karapınar, Sinop
- Kılıçlı, Sinop
- Kirençukuru, Sinop
- Korucuk, Sinop
- Kozcuğaz, Sinop
- Lala, Sinop
- Melikşah, Sinop
- Mertoğlu, Sinop
- Oğuzeli, Sinop
- Ordu, Sinop
- Osmaniye, Sinop
- Sarıkum, Sinop
- Sazlı, Sinop
- Sinecan, Sinop
- Şamlıoğlu, Sinop
- Tangaloğlu, Sinop
- Taşmanlı, Sinop
- Taypaklı, Sinop
- Tıngıroğlu, Sinop
- Uzungürgen, Sinop
- Yalı, Sinop

== Ayancık ==
- Ayancık
- Abdülkadirköy, Ayancık
- Ağaçlı, Ayancık
- Akçakese, Ayancık
- Akören, Ayancık
- Aliköy, Ayancık
- Armutluyazı, Ayancık
- Aşağıköy, Ayancık
- Avdullu, Ayancık
- Aygördü, Ayancık
- Babaçay, Ayancık
- Babaköy, Ayancık
- Bahçeli, Ayancık
- Bakırlı, Ayancık
- Bakırlızaviye, Ayancık
- Belpınar, Ayancık
- Büyükdüz, Ayancık
- Büyükpınar, Ayancık
- Çamyayla, Ayancık
- Çaybaşı, Ayancık
- Çaylıoğlu, Ayancık
- Davutlu, Ayancık
- Dedeağaç, Ayancık
- Dereköy, Ayancık
- Dibekli, Ayancık
- Doğanlı, Ayancık
- Dolay, Ayancık
- Erdemli, Ayancık
- Erikli, Ayancık
- Fındıklı, Ayancık
- Göldağı, Ayancık
- Gölköy, Ayancık
- Gürpınar, Ayancık
- Gürsökü, Ayancık
- Hacılı, Ayancık
- Hacıoğlu, Ayancık
- Hatip, Ayancık
- Hüseyinbey, Ayancık
- İnaltı, Ayancık
- Kaldırayak, Ayancık
- Karakestane, Ayancık
- Karapınar, Ayancık
- Kestanelik, Ayancık
- Kızılcakaya, Ayancık
- Kozcuğaz, Ayancık
- Kozsökü, Ayancık
- Köseyakası, Ayancık
- Kurtköy, Ayancık
- Kütükköy, Ayancık
- Maden, Ayancık
- Mestan, Ayancık
- Mustafakemalpaşa, Ayancık
- Ortalık, Ayancık
- Otmanlı, Ayancık
- Ömerdüz, Ayancık
- Pazarcık, Ayancık
- Sofu, Ayancık
- Söküçayırı, Ayancık
- Sulusökü, Ayancık
- Tarakçı, Ayancık
- Tepecik, Ayancık
- Tevfikiye, Ayancık
- Topağaç, Ayancık
- Türkmen, Ayancık
- Uzunçam, Ayancık
- Ünlüce, Ayancık
- Yarenler, Ayancık
- Yemişen, Ayancık
- Yenice, Ayancık
- Yenigüler, Ayancık
- Yeşilyurt, Ayancık
- Zaviye, Ayancık

== Boyabat ==
- Boyabat
- Akçakese, Boyabat
- Akyürük, Boyabat
- Alibeyli, Boyabat
- Ardıç, Boyabat
- Arıoğlu, Boyabat
- Aşağıseyricek, Boyabat
- Aşıklı, Boyabat
- Aydoğan, Boyabat
- Bağlıca, Boyabat
- Bayamca, Boyabat
- Bektaş, Boyabat
- Bengübelen, Boyabat
- Benişli, Boyabat
- Binerli, Boyabat
- Boyalı, Boyabat
- Bölüklü, Boyabat
- Bürüm, Boyabat
- Büyükkaraağaç, Boyabat
- Cemalettinköy, Boyabat
- Curkuşlar, Boyabat
- Çaltu, Boyabat
- Çarşak, Boyabat
- Çatpınar, Boyabat
- Çattepe, Boyabat
- Çaybaşı, Boyabat
- Çeşnigir, Boyabat
- Çorak, Boyabat
- Çukurhan, Boyabat
- Çulhalı, Boyabat
- Dağtabaklı, Boyabat
- Darıözü, Boyabat
- Daylı, Boyabat
- Dereçatı, Boyabat
- Dodurga, Boyabat
- Doğrul, Boyabat
- Doğuca, Boyabat
- Düzkaraağaç, Boyabat
- Edil, Boyabat
- Eğlence, Boyabat
- Ekinören, Boyabat
- Emiroğlu, Boyabat
- Engilekin, Boyabat
- Erkeç, Boyabat
- Esengazili, Boyabat
- Esentepe, Boyabat
- Gazideresi, Boyabat
- Gazideretabaklı, Boyabat
- Gökçeağaçsakızı, Boyabat
- Gökçukur, Boyabat
- Göve, Boyabat
- Günpınar, Boyabat
- Hacıahmetli, Boyabat
- Hamzalı, Boyabat
- Ilıcaköy, Boyabat
- İmamlı, Boyabat
- İsaoğlu, Boyabat
- Kadınlı, Boyabat
- Karacaören, Boyabat
- Karamusalı, Boyabat
- Kartaloğlu, Boyabat
- Kavacık, Boyabat
- Kavak, Boyabat
- Kayaboğazı, Boyabat
- Keseköy, Boyabat
- Kılıçlı, Boyabat
- Killik, Boyabat
- Koçak, Boyabat
- Kovaçayır, Boyabat
- Kozanlı, Boyabat
- Kozkule, Boyabat
- Köprücek, Boyabat
- Kurtlu, Boyabat
- Kurusaray, Boyabat
- Kuyucakpınar, Boyabat
- Kuzveren, Boyabat
- Mahmutlu, Boyabat
- Maruf, Boyabat
- Marufalınca, Boyabat
- Muratlı, Boyabat
- Oğlakçılar, Boyabat
- Okçumehmetli, Boyabat
- Osmanköy, Boyabat
- Ömerköy, Boyabat
- Ören, Boyabat
- Paşalıoğlu, Boyabat
- Pirefendideresi, Boyabat
- Salar, Boyabat
- Sarıağaççayı, Boyabat
- Sarıyer, Boyabat
- Şıhlar, Boyabat
- Şıhlı, Boyabat
- Taşhanlı, Boyabat
- Tekke, Boyabat
- Tırnalı, Boyabat
- Uzunçay, Boyabat
- Yabanlı, Boyabat
- Yaylacık, Boyabat
- Yazıköy, Boyabat
- Yenicamili, Boyabat
- Yenikayalı, Boyabat
- Yeniköy, Boyabat
- Yenimehmetli, Boyabat
- Yeşilçam, Boyabat
- Yeşilköy, Boyabat
- Yeşilyörük, Boyabat
- Yeşilyurt, Boyabat
- Yukarıseyricek, Boyabat

== Durağan ==
- Durağan
- Akbel, Durağan
- Akçaalan, Durağan
- Akçabük, Durağan
- Akpınar, Durağan
- Alpaşalı, Durağan
- Alpuğan, Durağan
- Aşağıalınca, Durağan
- Aşağıkaracaören, Durağan
- Ayvacık, Durağan
- Başağaç, Durağan
- Bayat, Durağan
- Beyardıç, Durağan
- Beybükü, Durağan
- Boyabükü, Durağan
- Boyalıca, Durağan
- Cevizlibağ, Durağan
- Çaltucak, Durağan
- Çamlıca, Durağan
- Çampaşasakızı, Durağan
- Çandağı, Durağan
- Çayağzı, Durağan
- Çerçiler, Durağan
- Çorakyüzü, Durağan
- Çöve, Durağan
- Dağdelen, Durağan
- Dereli, Durağan
- Emirtolu, Durağan
- Erduası, Durağan
- Erenköy, Durağan
- Gökçebelen, Durağan
- Gökdoğan, Durağan
- Gölalan, Durağan
- Gölgerişi, Durağan
- Güngören, Durağan
- Gürpınar, Durağan
- Hacımahmutlu, Durağan
- Hacıoğlan, Durağan
- İncir, Durağan
- Kaplangı, Durağan
- Karagüney, Durağan
- Karataş, Durağan
- Kavaklı, Durağan
- Kemerbahçe, Durağan
- Kılıçaslan, Durağan
- Kızılcapelit, Durağan
- Kirencik, Durağan
- Köklen, Durağan
- Köseli, Durağan
- Kuz, Durağan
- Kuzuluk, Durağan
- Olucak, Durağan
- Olukbaşı, Durağan
- Ortaköy, Durağan
- Salarkolu, Durağan
- Sarıkadı, Durağan
- Sarıyar, Durağan
- Sarnıkalıncası, Durağan
- Sofular, Durağan
- Ulupınar, Durağan
- Uzunöz, Durağan
- Yağbasan, Durağan
- Yalnızkavak, Durağan
- Yanalak, Durağan
- Yandak, Durağan
- Yassıalan, Durağan
- Yemişen, Durağan
- Yeniköy, Durağan
- Yeşilkent, Durağan
- Yeşilyurt, Durağan
- Yukarıkaracaören, Durağan

== Erfelek ==
- Erfelek
- Abdurrahmanpaşa, Erfelek
- Akcaçam, Erfelek
- Akcasöğüt, Erfelek
- Avlağasökü, Erfelek
- Aydınlar, Erfelek
- Balıfakı, Erfelek
- Başaran, Erfelek
- Çayırköy, Erfelek
- Dağyeri, Erfelek
- Değirmencili, Erfelek
- Dereköy, Erfelek
- Emirhalil, Erfelek
- Gökçebel, Erfelek
- Gümüşsuyu, Erfelek
- Güven, Erfelek
- Hacılar, Erfelek
- Hamidiye, Erfelek
- Hasandere, Erfelek
- Himmetoğlu, Erfelek
- Horzum, Erfelek
- Hürremşah, Erfelek
- İncirpınarı, Erfelek
- İnesökü, Erfelek
- Kaldırayak, Erfelek
- Karacaköy, Erfelek
- Karaoğlu, Erfelek
- Kazmasökü, Erfelek
- Kızılcaelma, Erfelek
- Kızılcaot, Erfelek
- Kirazlık, Erfelek
- Kurcalı, Erfelek
- Mescitdüzü, Erfelek
- Meydan, Erfelek
- Ormantepe, Erfelek
- Salı, Erfelek
- Sarıboğa, Erfelek
- Selbeyi, Erfelek
- Soğucalı, Erfelek
- Sorgun, Erfelek
- Şerefiye, Erfelek
- Tatlıca, Erfelek
- Tekke, Erfelek
- Tombul, Erfelek
- Veysel, Erfelek
- Yeniçam, Erfelek
- Yeniköy, Erfelek

== Gerze ==
- Gerze
- Abdaloğlu, Gerze
- Acısu, Gerze
- Akgüney, Gerze
- Akkıraç, Gerze
- Altınyayla, Gerze
- Başsökü, Gerze
- Belören, Gerze
- Bolalı, Gerze
- Boyalı, Gerze
- Boyalıca, Gerze
- Çağlayan, Gerze
- Çakallı, Gerze
- Çırnık, Gerze
- Gürsökü, Gerze
- Güzelyurt, Gerze
- Hacıselli, Gerze
- Hıdırlı, Gerze
- Hizarçayı, Gerze
- Kabanlar, Gerze
- Kahramaneli, Gerze
- Karlı, Gerze
- Kızılcalı, Gerze
- Kirençukuru, Gerze
- Kuzsökü, Gerze
- Mahmuttırı, Gerze
- Pirahmet, Gerze
- Sarımsak, Gerze
- Sarıyer, Gerze
- Sarnıç, Gerze
- Sazak, Gerze
- Sorkun, Gerze
- Şeyhli, Gerze
- Tatlıcak, Gerze
- Tepealtı, Gerze
- Tokuşlar, Gerze
- Türkmen, Gerze
- Türkmenlioğlu, Gerze
- Yakadibi, Gerze
- Yamacık, Gerze
- Yaykıl, Gerze
- Yenikent, Gerze
- Yuvalı, Gerze

== Türkeli ==
- Türkeli
- Akçabük, Türkeli
- Alagöz, Türkeli
- Ayaz, Türkeli
- Çatakgeriş, Türkeli
- Çatakgüney, Türkeli
- Çatakörencik, Türkeli
- Direkli, Türkeli
- Düz, Türkeli
- Düzler, Türkeli
- Gaziler, Türkeli
- Gencek, Türkeli
- Gökçealan, Türkeli
- Gündoğdu, Türkeli
- Güzelkent, Türkeli
- Hacı, Türkeli
- Hamamlı, Türkeli
- Işıklı, Türkeli
- Karabey, Türkeli
- Kayabaşı, Türkeli
- Kuşçular, Türkeli
- Kuz, Türkeli
- Oymayaka, Türkeli
- Sarmaşık, Türkeli
- Satı, Türkeli
- Sazkışla, Türkeli
- Taçahmet, Türkeli
- Taşgüney, Türkeli
- Turhan, Türkeli
- Yapraklı, Türkeli
- Yazıcı, Türkeli
- Yeşiloba, Türkeli
- Yusuflu, Türkeli

== Dikmen ==
- Dikmen
- Akçakese, Dikmen
- Babalıoğlu, Dikmen
- Bucak, Dikmen
- Büyükdağ, Dikmen
- Büyükkızık, Dikmen
- Çanakçı, Dikmen
- Çevikli, Dikmen
- Çorak, Dikmen
- Çukurcaalan, Dikmen
- Dağköy, Dikmen
- Dudaş, Dikmen
- Dumanlı, Dikmen
- Göllü, Dikmen
- Görümcek, Dikmen
- Kadıköy, Dikmen
- Karaağaç, Dikmen
- Karakoyun, Dikmen
- Kerim, Dikmen
- Kuzalan, Dikmen
- Küçükkızık, Dikmen
- Küplüce, Dikmen
- Saray, Dikmen
- Şeyhhüseyin, Dikmen
- Üçpınar, Dikmen
- Usta Köy
- Yakuplu, Dikmen
- Yaykın, Dikmen
- Yaylabeyi, Dikmen
- Yeniköy, Dikmen
- Yukarıçekmez, Dikmen
- Yumaklı, Dikmen

== Saraydüzü ==
- Saraydüzü
- Akbelen, Saraydüzü
- Arım, Saraydüzü
- Asarcıkcamili, Saraydüzü
- Asarcıkhacıköy, Saraydüzü
- Asarcıkkayalı, Saraydüzü
- Asarcıkkazaklı, Saraydüzü
- Aşağıakpınar, Saraydüzü
- Aşağıdarıçay, Saraydüzü
- Avluca, Saraydüzü
- Bahçeköy, Saraydüzü
- Bahşaşlı, Saraydüzü
- Başekin, Saraydüzü
- Cumakayalı, Saraydüzü
- Cumaköy, Saraydüzü
- Cumatabaklı, Saraydüzü
- Çalpınar, Saraydüzü
- Çampaşalı, Saraydüzü
- Çorman, Saraydüzü
- Fakılı, Saraydüzü
- Göynükören, Saraydüzü
- Hacıçay, Saraydüzü
- Hanoğlu, Saraydüzü
- Karaçaygöleti, Saraydüzü
- Korucuk, Saraydüzü
- Tepeköy, Saraydüzü
- Uluköy, Saraydüzü
- Yalmansaray, Saraydüzü
- Yaylacılı, Saraydüzü
- Yenice, Saraydüzü
- Yukarıakpınar, Saraydüzü
- Yukarıarım, Saraydüzü
- Zaimköy, Saraydüzü
