= Sinop =

Sinop can refer to:

- Sinop, Turkey, a city on the Black Sea
  - Sinop Nuclear Power Plant, was planned in 2013, but cancelled in 2018
  - Battle of Sinop, 1853 naval battle in the Sinop port
    - Russian ship Sinop, Russian ships named after the battle
- Sinop Province, the province in Turkey of which the above city is the capital
  - Sinop District, the province's capital district
  - Sinop (electoral district), the province's electoral district
- Sinop, Mato Grosso, a city in Mato Grosso state, Brazil
- Sinop (grasshopper), a genus of grasshoppers in the family Acrididae
- Sinop (crater), a small crater on Mars

== See also ==
- Sinope (disambiguation)
