= Barış Karadeniz =

Turkish politician (born 1975)

Barış Karadeniz MP

Member of the Grand National Assembly
- Incumbent
- Assumed office 7 June 2015
- Constituency: Sinop (June 2015, Nov 2015, 2018, 2023)

Personal details
- Party: Republican People's Party (CHP)
- Education: Muğla University
- Occupation: Politician

Barış Karadeniz (born 27 August 1975) is a Turkish politician from the Republican People's Party (CHP), who has served as a Member of parliament for Sinop since 7 June 2015.

== Biography ==
Barış Karadeniz was born on 27 August 1975 in Sinop Province, Turkey to Cemil Karadeniz and his wife Hatice. After completing his primary, secondary, and high-school education in Sinop, he graduated from the Muğla University's Faculty of Economics and Administrative Sciences, Department of Economics. After his military service, he worked as a teacher in Bektaşağa and Türkeli in 2000 and 2001. In 2003, he founded a public accountant office with his friend. Karadeniz is married and can speak semi-fluent English.

Karadeniz began his political career in the Social Democratic Populist Party (SHP) in 1994, first as a member of the party's youth wing. After SHP merged with Republican People's Party (CHP), he continued his political career in the CHP. In the local elections of 29 March 2009, Karadeniz was elected Mayor of Sinop Central District before resigning to contest a seat in the Grand National Assembly of Turkey (TBMM) in the forthcoming general election.

Barış Karadeniz was elected as a CHP Member of Parliament for the electoral district of Sinop in the June 2015 general election and was re-elected in November 2015. He is member of several Non-governmental organizations including Atatürkist Thought Association (ADD), Association for Supporting Contemporary Life, Antinuclear Platform, SAYK, SİNOFF, and ALDER.

== See also ==
- 26th Parliament of Turkey
