= Dikmen (disambiguation) =

Dikmen is a town of Sinop Province, Turkey.

Dikmen (Turkish: a conical hill) may refer to:

== People ==
- Dikmen (surname)

== Places ==
- Dikmen District, a district of Sinop Province, Turkey
- Dikmen, Aksaray, a village in the district of Aksaray, Aksaray Province, Turkey
- Dikmen, Akseki, a village in the district of Akseki, Antalya Province, Turkey
- Dikmen, Beypazarı, a village in the district of Beypazarı, Ankara Province, Turkey
- Dikmen, Biga
- Dikmen, Gerede, a village in the district of Gerede, Bolu Province, Turkey
- Dikmen, İliç
- Dikmen, Karacasu, a village in the district of Karacasu, Aydın Province, Turkey
- Dikmen, Mardin, a town in the district of Kızıltepe, Mardin Province, Turkey
- Dikmen, Manavgat, a village in the district of Manavgat, Antalya Province, Turkey
- Dikmen, Serik, a village in the district of Serik, Antalya Province, Turkey
- Dikmen, Sivrice
- Dikmen, Cyprus, Turkish name of the Cypriot village of Dikomo
