= Yaylacılı, Saraydüzü =

Yaylacılı
- Village
- Location within Turkey
- Coordinates: 41°15′43″N 34°51′58″E
- Country: Turkey
- Province: Sinop
- District: Saraydüzü
- Population (2022): 143
- Time zone: UTC+3 (TRT)

Yaylacılı is a village in the Saraydüzü District of Sinop Province, Turkey. Its population is 143 (2022). It is in the Kızılırmak ("red river") valley near Saraydüzü.

== History ==
The village has a semi-nomadic, tribal origin. The economy before 1940 was based on sheep and goat herds grazing during the winter on the snow-free slopes of the Kızılırmak valley, and in summers in "Kaşlı Yayla"—summer green mountain pastures six hours march to the north-northwest 41.2163°N 34.7325°E). The villagers also practiced subsistence farming, growing grains and fruits on the south-facing slopes of the valley.

Soldiers from the village died at the Dardanelles front in WWI.

Rice-growing in Yaylacılı started in 1937 in the unused river valley two years after a communal decision following the construction of an irrigation canal, which was built for the village in exchange for a share of the produce from the irrigated lands equitably divided among the villagers. The irrigation entrepreneur was "Şamlı Hüseyin (Yayla)", a native of the village who trained as a teacher in Damascus and later worked as a shopkeeper in Boyabat.

The wet farming of rice as a cash crop became a good source of income and other river valley communities nearby copied the irrigation scheme. Yaylacılı became the richest village in the vicinity due to the first mover advantage and due to a wider valley bottom in front of the village. This land was irrigated later by several additional canals and farmed even more intensively.

In 1958 the Turkish government started evaluating the valley for the possible construction of a hydroelectric dam and power station. The dam threat was there for 50 years. Construction began in 2008.

The 150-house village and its rice fields were inundated in 2012 by waters of the Boyabat hydroelectric dam. Some of the inhabitants settled on the new shore approximately 150 m. higher than the original location (41°16′N 34°53′E) and a few kilometers northwestwards. Other inhabitants moved over the ridge to the north at Çalca (41.284°N 34.852°E), Elicek (41.297°N 34.852°E), or further afield to Tepeköy (41.325°N 34.835°E) and Boyabat.

== Population ==
Population has been steadily shrinking in expectation of the dam but also because of the effectivization of rice farming.

Historical population
Year	Pop.	±% p.a.
1990	662	—
1997	375	−7.80%
2007	268	−3.30%
2012	116	−15.42%
2017	127	+1.83%
2022	143	+2.40%
Source: 1990 census, 1997 census and TÜIK (2007-2022)
