= Yasemin Özata Çetinkaya =

Turkish civil servant

Governor of Sinop
- In office February 16, 2015 – July 16, 2016
- Preceded by: Yavuz Selim Köşger
- Succeeded by: Kemal Cirit

Personal details
- Born: Yasemin Özata; 1976 (age 49–50) Ankara, Turkey
- Education: Ankara University Faculty of Political Sciences; Black Sea Technical University

Yasemin Özata Çetinkaya (born Yasemin Özata in 1976) is a Turkish civil servant. She served as the Governor of Sinop from February 16, 2015 until July 16, 2016, when she was removed from office and her husband, a colonel in the Turkish Army, was arrested for allegedly taking part in the 2016 Turkish coup d'état attempt.

Born 1976 in Ankara, she completed her primary and secondary education in her hometown. In 1996, she graduated with a Bachelor's degree in Public administration from Ankara University's Faculty of Political Sciences.

She joined Ministry of the Interior, and began her career as a candidate district governor in Kırıkkale. During this term, she attended a language course for eight months in the United Kingdom. After returning home, she was appointed vice district governor in Gönen, Isparta. After earning a Master's degree from Ankara University, Özata was promoted to district governor status, and served in Kalkandere, Rize, Hamur, Ağrı and Gölpazarı, Bilecik. Between 2008-2011, she was the vice governor in Batman Province, from 2011 to 2013 district governor of Hacılar, Kayseri and between 2013 and 2015 district governor in Talas, Kayseri. In 2012, she obtained a PhD degree in Economics from the Black Sea Technical University.

On February 16, 2015, she was appointed governor of Sinop Province, and took office on March 6, 2015. She became so the third ever female province governor in Turkey.

Özata is married to an officer of the Turkish Army. They have three daughters.
