= Türkeli (disambiguation) =

Türkeli is a town in Turkey. Türkeli may also refer to:

== People ==
- Kıznaz Türkeli, Turkish politician
- Gonca Türkeli-Dehnert (born 1975), German administrative lawyer

== Other uses ==
- Türkeli District, district in Turkey
- Türkeli Feneri, lighthouse in Turkey
