= Boyabat Castle =

Castle in Boyabat, Sinop Province, Turkey

Coordinates: 41.4659°N 34.7614°E

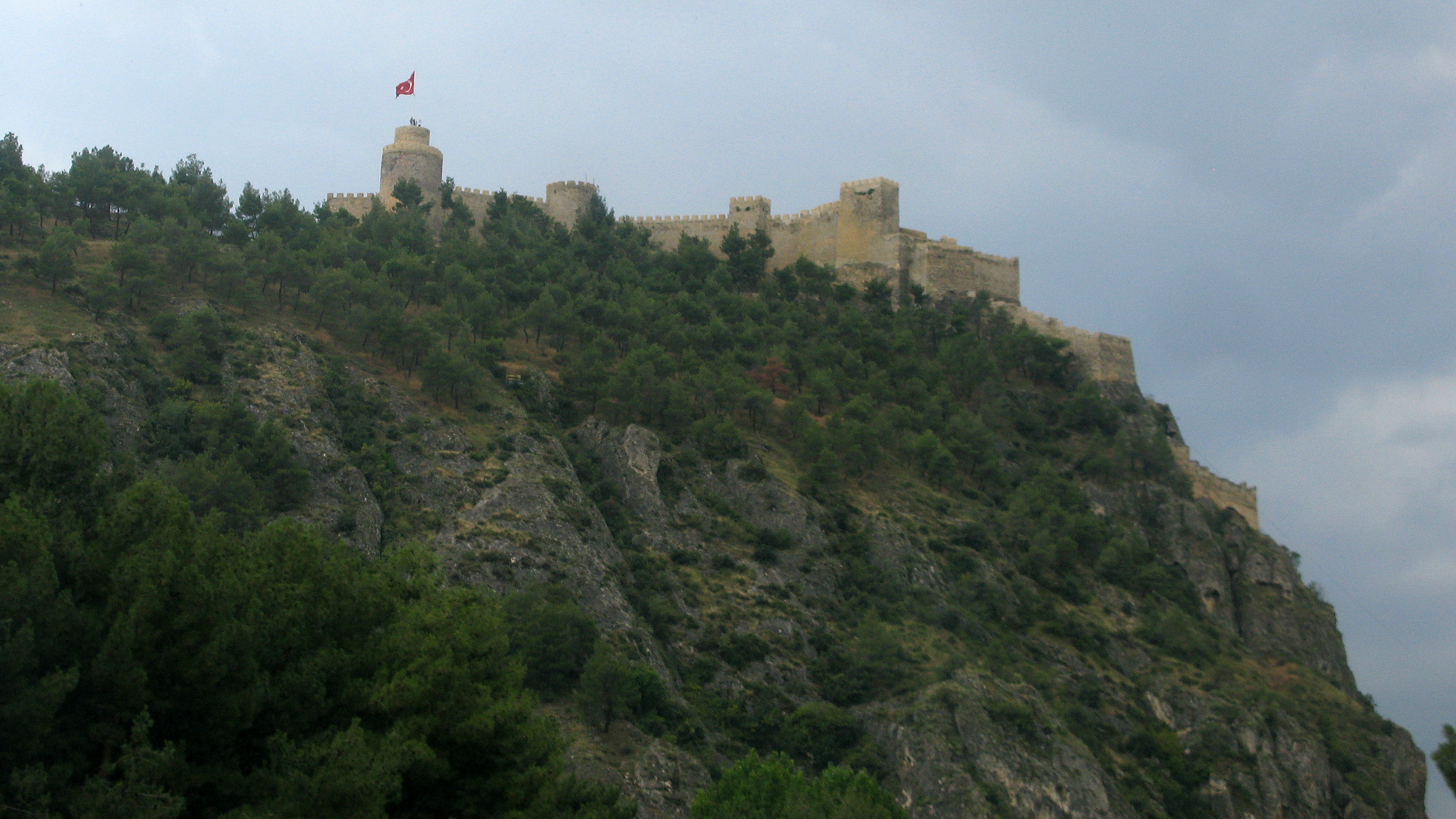
The Castle of Boyabat on top of a hill

Boyabat Castle, is a castle in the town of Boyabat, Sinop Province, Turkey built by the Paphlagonians in antiquity and reconstructed under Roman, Byzantine, and Ottoman rule. The castle functions as a museum today.

== Castle ==
Kazdere/Gazidere, a tributary of Gökirmak, cuts the rock that the Boyabat Castle is perched on with a dramatic pair of vertical walls. The wall on the castle side has a window on the rock face illuminating descending tunnels to a newly discovered large underground city from Roman times. The tunnels may also have served for water supply and safe passage during siege.

The castle, which probably has not been in serious use since around 1300 A.D. but may be as old as 2800 years, overlooks the Gökırmak valley. This valley is long and lies parallel with the Black Sea coast. Together with the similarly placed Yeşilırmak (river) valley further east, it forms a natural east–west pathway used since the antiquity as a trade route, possibly as part of the silk road. The castle may have served to protect this trade route. Being a suitable distance from Durağan, Hanönü and Taşköprü, it may have provided safe stop for caravans.

The older history of the area may have started from Bronze Age, and it may have been ruled by Kaskians, Hittites, Paphlagonians, Persians, Lydians, Pontus kingdom, and Romans.

The area has since it has been captured by Gazi Gümüshtigin, the second leader of the Danishmends, a vassal of the Seljuq Sultanate of Rum, few decades after the Battle of Manzikert (1071) been under the rule of several Turkish states (Danishmends, Seljuq Turks, Pervaneoğulları, Jandarids), Ottoman Empire and Turkish Republic and has been spared from major military conflicts and battles on its territory for at least 500 years.

In the late 19th and early 20th century, Boyabat was part of the Kastamonu Vilayet of the Ottoman Empire.
