= Engin Altay =

Turkish politician (born 1963)

Engin Altay MP
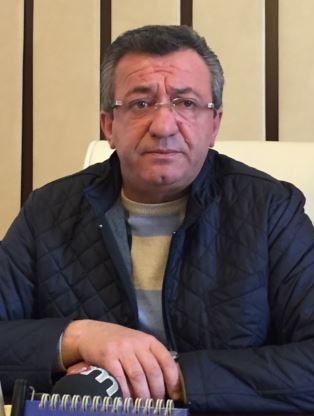

Parliamentary group leader of the Republican People's Party
- In office 26 June 2013 – 3 June 2023
- Leader: Kemal Kılıçdaroğlu
- Preceded by: Emine Ülker Tarhan
- Succeeded by: Burcu Köksal

Member of the Grand National Assembly
- Incumbent
- Assumed office 3 November 2002
- Constituency: Sinop (2002, 2007, 2011); İstanbul (III) (June 2015, Nov 2015, 2018, 2023)

Personal details
- Born: 15 December 1963 (age 62) Erfelek, Sinop Province, Turkey
- Party: Republican People's Party
- Education: Dokuz Eylül University

Engin Altay (born 15 December 1963) is a Turkish politician from the Republican People's Party (CHP) who serves as a Member of Parliament for the electoral district of Sinop since the 2002. He was re-elected in 2007, 2011, June 2015 and November 2015. On 30 June 2011, Altay was elected as one of the three CHP parliamentary group leaders, serving alongside Muharrem İnce, Akif Hamzaçebi and later Levent Gök.

== Early life and career ==
Born and raised in Sinop, Altay was educated at Dokuz Eylül University and became a teacher in various districts in the provinces of Sinop and Sivas. He briefly served as deputy mayor for the town of Erfelek for a year before resigning in order to contest the 2002 general election. He won a seat in his hometown of Sinop. In parliament, he was a member of the Human Rights Commission as well as the Education, Youth, Culture and Sport committees. He led the Turkey-Mongolia partnership commission for four years.

Having served as a member of the CHP party council and central executive committee, Altay was elected parliamentary group leader in 2013 after his predecessor Emine Ülker Tarhan stood down. He has been at the forefront of efforts to bring AKP government ministers accused of corruption to court and received both praise and criticism for throwing a copy of the parliamentary by-laws at speaker Cemil Çiçek during the swearing in ceremony of Recep Tayyip Erdoğan.

He is married with one child and can speak English at a semi-fluent level.

== See also ==
- Muharrem İnce
- Sinop (electoral district)
