= Hamsilos Bay =

Black Sea bay in Sinop, Turkey

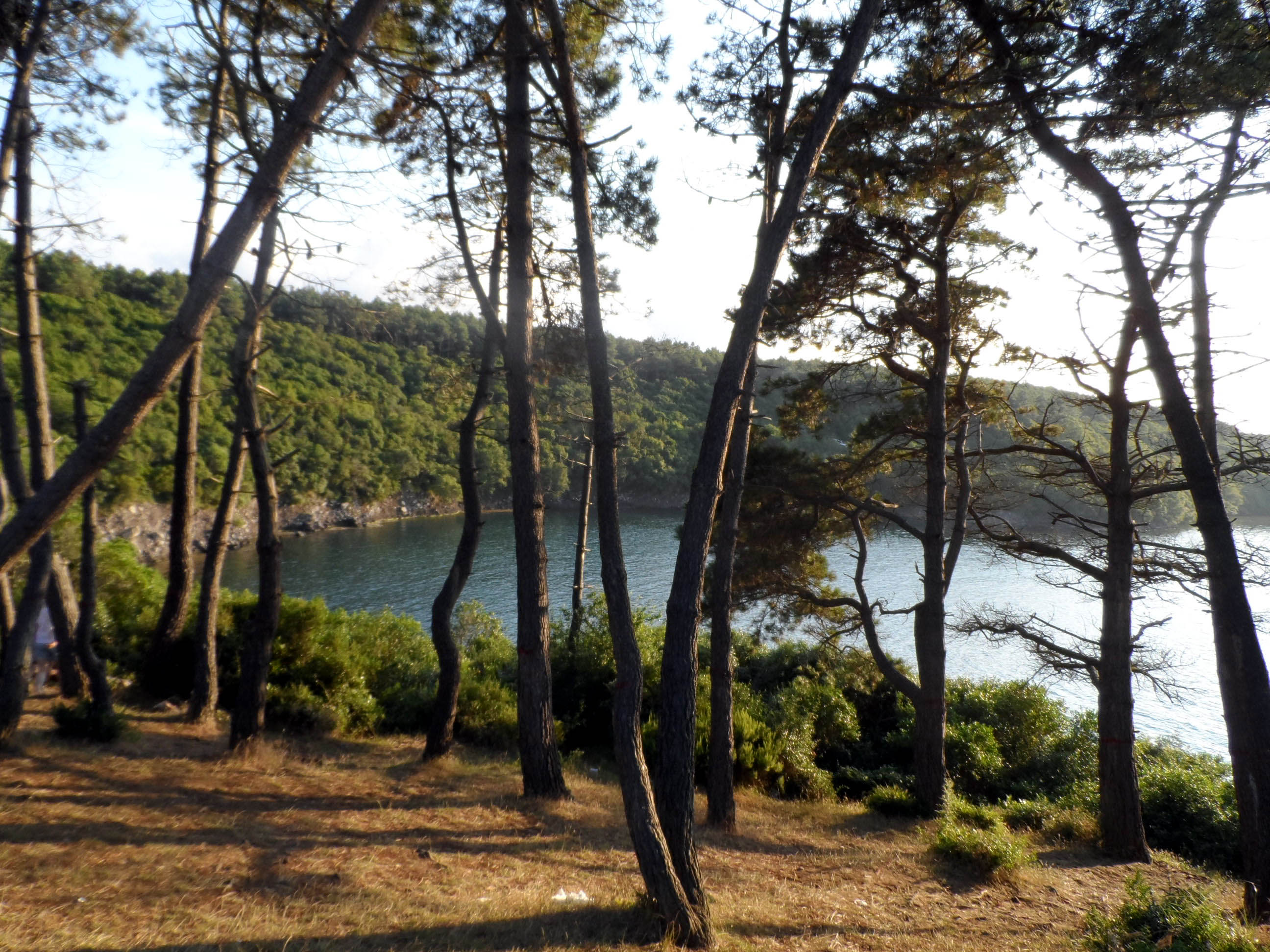
Hamsilos Bay in Sinop Province, Turkey

Hamsilos Bay (also called Hamsalos) is a Black Sea bay in Sinop Province, the northernmost tip of Turkey.

== Geography ==
Hamsilos Bay at 42°03′40″N 35°02′36″E is to the west of Sinop, and to the east of İnceburun Lighthouse. The highway distance to Sinop is 11 kilometres (6.8 mi). It is situated at the west end of Akliman, a long beach which is a popular excursion spot for the Sinop citizens. The width of the bay is about 250 metres (820 ft) facing to east.

== The fjord ==
Hamsilos Bay is popularly called “the only fjord of Turkey”. However in fact there are no fjords in Turkey and Hamsilos is only a cove with a peculiar shape. On a map, it resembles an elephant head. It is famed to be a beautiful spot where the forests meet the sea. In the past it was considered as a natural harbor for marine vessels.

== Nature park ==
Hamsilos as well as the neighboring Akliman are declared a nature park in 2007. Its area is 67.9 hectares (168 acres). But there are concerns about the future of the park because of the planned Sinop Nuclear Power Plant to the south of the Hamsilos Bay.
