= Saraydüzü Dam =

- Interactive map of Saraydüzü Dam
- Location: Turkey
- Construction began: 1994
- Opening date: 2001

Saraydüzü Dam is a dam in Sinop Province, Turkey, built between 1994 and 2001. The development was backed by the Turkish State Hydraulic Works.

== See also ==
- List of dams and reservoirs in Turkey
