= Colussa =

Ancient Greek city

Coordinates: 41°56′51″N 34°16′17″E

Colussa or Koloussa (Ancient Greek: Κόλουσσα) was an ancient Greek city on the Black Sea coast of ancient Paphlagonia.

Its site is located near Güllüsu in Sinop Province, Turkey.
