= Yenikent =

Yenikent may refer to:

- Yenikent, Aksaray, village in Aksaray Province, Turkey
- Yenikent, Gerze, village in Sinop Province, Turkey

== See also ==
- Jankent
