= Çamyayla, Ayancık =

Çamyayla
- Village
- Location within Turkey
- Coordinates: 41.857°N 34.555°E
- Country: Turkey
- Province: Sinop
- District: Ayancık
- Population (2022): 88
- Time zone: UTC+3 (TRT)

Çamyayla is a village in the Ayancık District of Sinop Province, Turkey. Its population is 88 (2022). The village economy is based on agriculture and animal husbandry. It is 72 km from Sinop and 13 km from Ayancık.

== Population ==
Historical population
Year	Pop.	±% p.a.
1997	182	—
2007	114	−4.57%
2012	92	−4.20%
2017	69	−5.59%
2022	88	+4.98%
Source: 1997 census and TÜIK (2007-2022)
