= Korucuk =

Korucuk in Turkish means small forest and it may refer to

- Korucuk a village in Anamur district of Mersin Province
- Korucuk a village in Gülnar district of Mersin Province
- Korucuk a village in the central district of Sinop Province
- Korucuk, Pasinler
- Korucuk, Seben
