= Güzelkent, Sinop =

Güzelkent Helaldı
- Village
- Location within Turkey
- Coordinates: 41°57′N 34°24′E
- Country: Turkey
- Province: Sinop
- District: Türkeli
- Elevation: 10 m (33 ft)
- Population (2022): 920
- Time zone: UTC+3 (TRT)
- Postal code: 57910
- Area code: 0368

Güzelkent is a village in Türkeli District of Sinop Province, Turkey. Its population is 920 (2022). Before the 2013 reorganisation, it was a town (belde). It is a coastal town of Black Sea. It is 5 kilometres (3.1 mi) east of Türkeli. According to old maps, there was a Greek town named Colussa near the current Güzelkent. Later a Turkish village named Helaldı was founded. After merging with other nearby villages Heladı was renamed as Güzelkent and was made a seat of township in 1989. The main economic activities of the town are fishing and light industry based on forestry.
