= Sinope =

Sinope may refer to:

== Places ==
- Sinop, Turkey, a city on the Black Sea, historically known as Sinope
- Sinop Province, an administrative division of Turkey
- Nea Sinopi, a village in Greece
- Sinope, Leicestershire, a hamlet in the Midlands of England

== Battles ==
- Siege of Sinope, a battle during the late history of the Byzantine Empire
- Battle of Sinop, 1853 naval battle in the Sinop port

== Other ==
- Sinope (mythology), in Greek mythology, daughter of Asopus
- Sinope (moon), a moon of the planet Jupiter
- Sinope (moth), a moth genus
- Sinope Gospels, fragment of a 6th-century illuminated manuscript

== See also ==
- Sinop (disambiguation)
