= Görümcek =

Settlement in Turkey

- Village
- Location within Turkey
- Coordinates: 41°38′53″N 35°09′23″E
- Country: Turkey
- Province: Sinop
- District: Dikmen
- Population (2022): 79
- Time zone: UTC+3 (TRT)

Görümcek is a village in the Dikmen District of Sinop Province, Turkey. Its population is 79 (2022). The village also contains the hamlets Ustaköy and Ötemahalle.
