= Durağan District =

District of Sinop Province, Turkey

- District
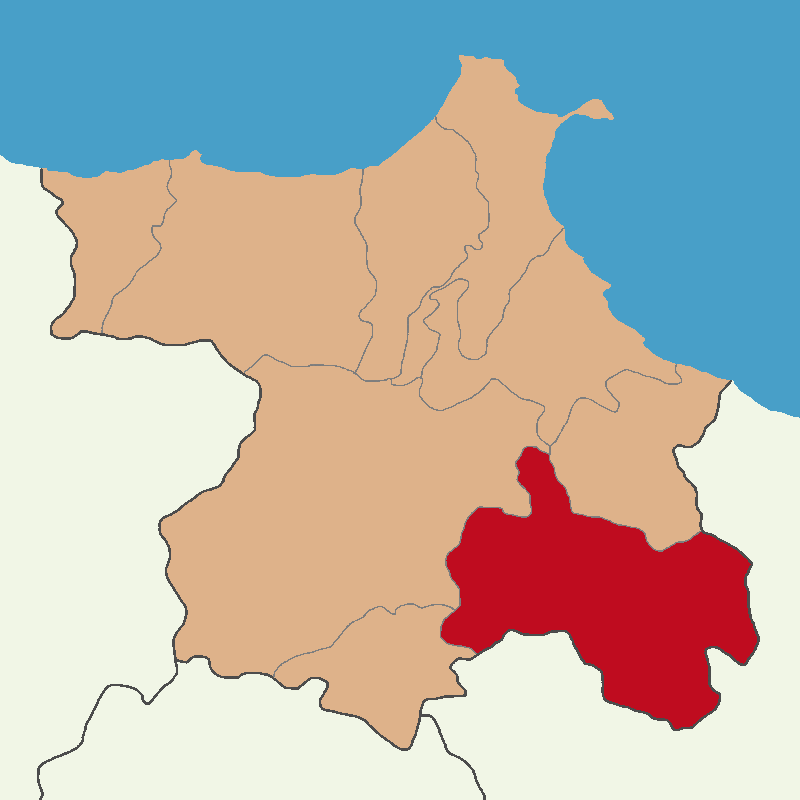
- Map showing Durağan District in Sinop Province

- Location in Turkey
- Coordinates: 41°25′N 35°03′E
- Country: Turkey
- Province: Sinop
- Seat: Durağan

Government
  - Kaymakam: Soner Erol
- Area: 995 km^{2} (384 sq mi)
- Population (2022): 16,832
  - Density: 17/km^{2} (44/sq mi)
- Time zone: UTC+3 (TRT)
- Website: www.duragan.gov.tr

Durağan District is a district of the Sinop Province of Turkey. Its seat is the town of Durağan. Its area is 995 km^{2}, and its population is 16,832 (2022).

== Composition ==
There is one municipality in Durağan District:

- Durağan

There are 69 villages in Durağan District:

- Akbel
- Akçaalan
- Akçabük
- Akpınar
- Alpaşalı
- Alpuğan
- Aşağıalınca
- Aşağıkaracaören
- Ayvacık
- Başağaç
- Bayat
- Beyardıç
- Beybükü
- Boyabükü
- Boyalıca
- Çaltucak
- Çamlıca
- Çampaşasakızı
- Çandağı
- Çayağzı
- Çerçiler
- Cevizlibağ
- Çorakyüzü
- Çöve
- Dağdelen
- Dereli
- Emirtolu
- Erduası
- Erenköy
- Gökçebelen
- Gökdoğan
- Gölalan
- Gölgerişi
- Güngören
- Gürpınar
- Hacımahmutlu
- Hacıoğlan
- İncir
- Kaplangı
- Karagüney
- Karataş
- Kavaklı
- Kemerbahçe
- Kılıçaslan
- Kirencik
- Kızılcapelit
- Köklen
- Köseli
- Kuz
- Kuzuluk
- Olucak
- Olukbaşı
- Ortaköy
- Salarkolu
- Sarıkadı
- Sarıyar
- Sarnıkalıncası
- Sofular
- Ulupınar
- Uzunöz
- Yağbasan
- Yalnızkavak
- Yanalak
- Yassıalan
- Yemişen
- Yeniköy
- Yeşilkent
- Yeşilyurt
- Yukarıkaracaören
