= Yenikent, Gerze =

Yenikent Gürsüfet
- Village
- Location within Turkey
- Coordinates: 41°43′N 35°14′E
- Country: Turkey
- Province: Sinop
- District: Gerze
- Elevation: 240 m (790 ft)
- Population (2022): 839
- Time zone: UTC+3 (TRT)
- Postal code: 57600
- Area code: 0368

Yenikent (formerly Gürsüfet) is a village in Gerze District of Sinop Province, Turkey. Its population is 839 (2022). Before the 2013 reorganisation, it was a town (belde). It is on Turkish state highway D.010 which connects Sinop to Samsun. Distance to Gerze is 12 kilometres (7.5 mi). The former name of the settlement refers to people who escaped from Georgia during the Russo-Turkish War (1877-1878). The settlement was declared a seat of township in 1990. But because of emigration to cities the population of the town has since been decreased.
