= Ayancık District =

District of Sinop Province, Turkey

- District
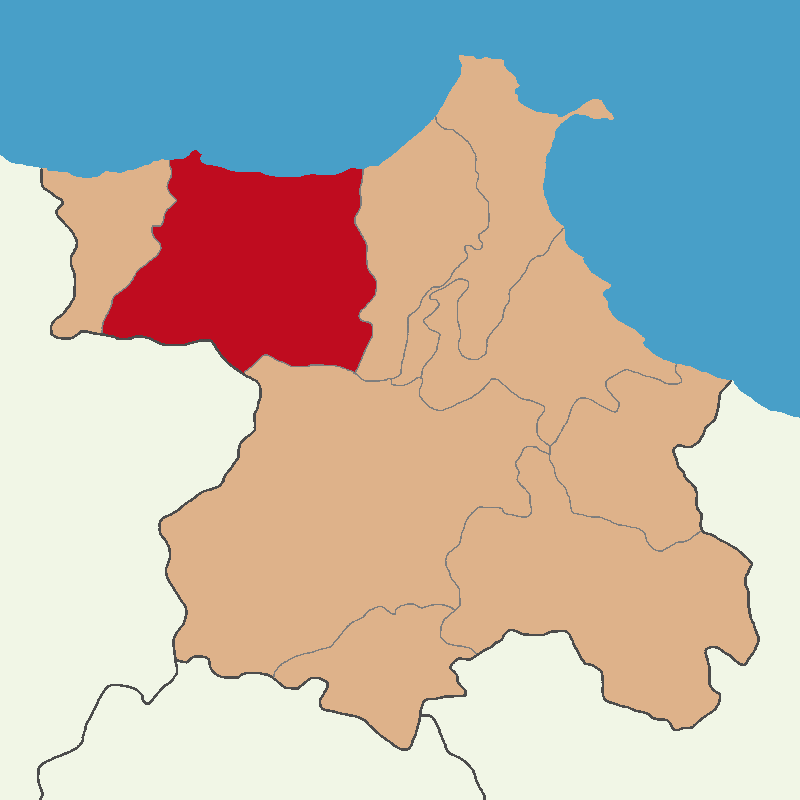
- Map showing Ayancık District in Sinop Province

- Location in Turkey
- Coordinates: 41°57′N 34°35′E
- Country: Turkey
- Province: Sinop
- Seat: Ayancık

Government
  - Kaymakam: Recep Hasar
- Area: 862 km^{2} (333 sq mi)
- Population (2022): 23,923
  - Density: 28/km^{2} (72/sq mi)
- Time zone: UTC+3 (TRT)
- Website: www.ayancik.gov.tr

Ayancık District is a district of the Sinop Province of Turkey. Its seat is the town of Ayancık. Its area is 862 km^{2}, and its population is 23,923 (2022).

== Composition ==
There is one municipality in Ayancık District:

- Ayancık

There are 71 villages in Ayancık District:

- Abdülkadirköy
- Ağaçlı
- Akçakese
- Akören
- Aliköy
- Armutluyazı
- Aşağıköy
- Avdullu
- Aygördü
- Babaçay
- Babaköy
- Bahçeli
- Bakırlı
- Bakırlızaviye
- Belpınar
- Büyükdüz
- Büyükpınar
- Çamyayla
- Çaybaşı
- Çaylıoğlu
- Davutlu
- Dedeağaç
- Dereköy
- Dibekli
- Doğanlı
- Dolay
- Erdemli
- Erikli
- Fındıklı
- Göldağı
- Gölköy
- Gülpınar
- Gürsökü
- Hacılı
- Hacıoğlu
- Hatip
- Hüseyinbey
- İnaltı
- Kaldırayak
- Karakestane
- Karapınar
- Kestanelik
- Kızılcakaya
- Köseyakası
- Kozcuğaz
- Kozsökü
- Kurtköy
- Kütükköy
- Maden
- Mestan
- Mustafakemalpaşa
- Ömerdüz
- Ortalık
- Otmanlı
- Pazarcık
- Sofu
- Söküçayırı
- Sulusökü
- Tarakçı
- Tepecik
- Tevfikiye
- Topağaç
- Türkmen
- Ünlüce
- Uzunçam
- Yarenler
- Yemişen
- Yenice
- Yenigüler
- Yeşilyurt
- Zaviye
