= Erfelek District =

District of Sinop Province, Turkey

- District
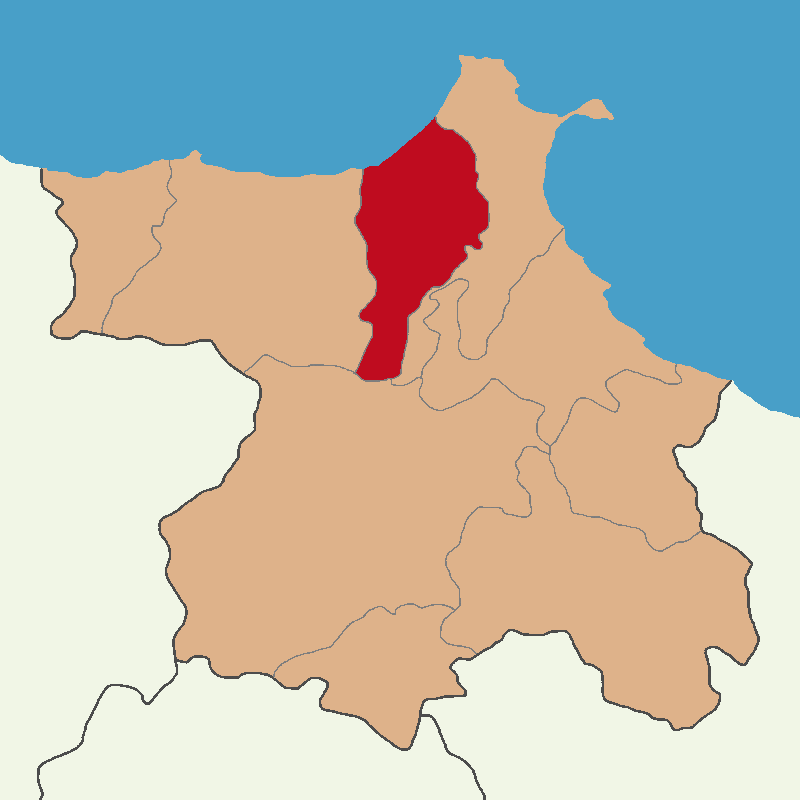
- Map showing Erfelek District in Sinop Province

- Location in Turkey
- Coordinates: 41°53′N 34°55′E
- Country: Turkey
- Province: Sinop
- Seat: Erfelek

Government
  - Kaymakam: Mustafa Düzgün
- Area: 412 km^{2} (159 sq mi)
- Population (2022): 12,363
  - Density: 30.0/km^{2} (77.7/sq mi)
- Time zone: UTC+3 (TRT)
- Website: www.erfelek.gov.tr

Erfelek District is a district of the Sinop Province of Turkey. Its seat is the town of Erfelek. Its area is 412 km^{2}, and its population is 12,363 (2022).

== Composition ==
There is one municipality in Erfelek District:

- Erfelek

There are 46 villages in Erfelek District:

- Abdurrahmanpaşa
- Ahmetmuhipdıranas
- Akçaçam
- Akçasöğüt
- Avlağısökü
- Aydınlar
- Balıfakı
- Başaran
- Çayırköy
- Dağyeri
- Değirmencili
- Dereköy
- Emirhalil
- Gökçebel
- Gümüşsuyu
- Güven
- Hacılar
- Hamidiye
- Hasandere
- Himmetoğlu
- Horzum
- Hürremşah
- İncirpınar
- İnesökü
- Kaldırayak
- Karacaköy
- Kazmasökü
- Kirazlık
- Kızılcaelma
- Kızılcaot
- Kurcalı
- Mescitdüzü
- Meydan
- Ormantepe
- Salı
- Sarıboğa
- Selbeyi
- Şerefiye
- Soğucalı
- Sorgun
- Tatlıca
- Tekke
- Tombul
- Veysel
- Yeniçam
- Yeniköy
