= Saraydüzü District =

District of Sinop Province, Turkey

- District
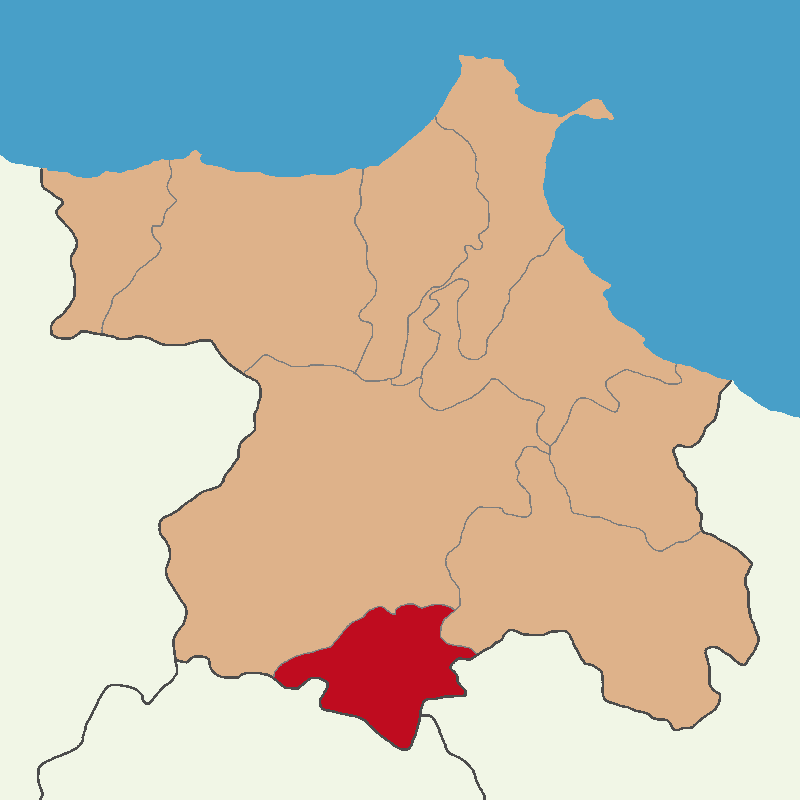
- Map showing Saraydüzü District in Sinop Province

- Location in Turkey
- Coordinates: 41°20′N 34°51′E
- Country: Turkey
- Province: Sinop
- Seat: Saraydüzü

Government
  - Kaymakam: Tugay Kalkanlı
- Area: 334 km^{2} (129 sq mi)
- Population (2022): 5,523
  - Density: 17/km^{2} (43/sq mi)
- Time zone: UTC+3 (TRT)
- Website: www.sarayduzu.gov.tr

Saraydüzü District is a district of the Sinop Province of Turkey. Its seat is the town of Saraydüzü. Its area is 334 km^{2}, and its population is 5,523 (2022).

== Composition ==
There is one municipality in Saraydüzü District:

- Saraydüzü

There are 31 villages in Saraydüzü District:

- Akbelen
- Arım
- Aşağı Akpınar
- Asarcıkcamili
- Asarcıkhacıköy
- Asarcıkkayalı
- Asarcıkkazaklı
- Avluca
- Bahçeköy
- Bahşaşlı
- Başekin
- Çalpınar
- Çampaşalı
- Çorman
- Cumakayalı
- Cumaköy
- Cumatabaklı
- Fakılı
- Göynükören
- Hacıçay
- Hanoğlu
- Karaçaygöleti
- Korucuk
- Tepeköy
- Uluköy
- Yalmansaray
- Yaylacılı
- Yenice
- Yukarı Akpınar
- Yukarıarım
- Zaimköy
