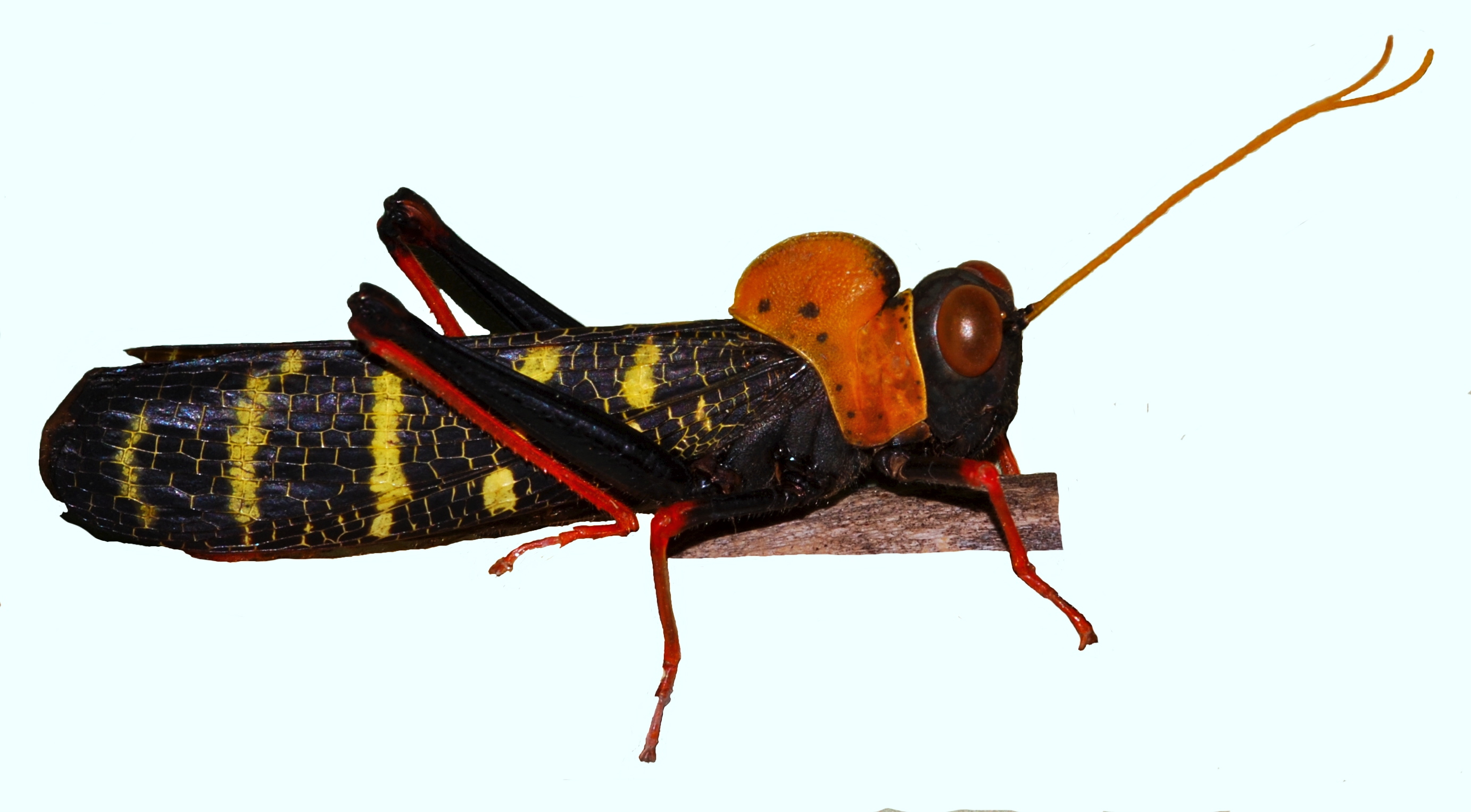
- Monachidium lunum

Scientific classification
- Kingdom: Animalia
- Phylum: Arthropoda
- Clade: Pancrustacea
- Class: Insecta
- Order: Orthoptera
- Suborder: Caelifera
- Family: Acrididae
- Subfamily: Copiocerinae; Brunner von Wattenwyl, 1893

= Copiocerinae =

Subfamily of grasshoppers

Copiocerinae is a subfamily of short-horned grasshoppers in the family Acrididae. There are at least 20 genera in Copiocerinae, found in southern North America, Central America, and South America.

== Tribes and genera ==
There are three tribes in Copiocerinae:

=== Aleuasini ===
Auth: Brunner von Wattenwyl, 1893

1. Aleuas Stål, 1878^{c g}
2. Zygoclistron Rehn, 1905^{c g}

=== Clematodini ===
Auth: Rehn & Eades, 1961

1. Apoxitettix Descamps, 1984^{c g}
2. Bucephalacris Giglio-Tos, 1894^{c g}
3. Clematodes Scudder, 1900^{i c g b}
4. Dellia Stål, 1878^{c g}

=== Copiocerini ===
Auth: Brunner von Wattenwyl, 1893

1. Adimantus Stål, 1878^{c g}
2. Antiphon Stål, 1878^{c g}
3. Caenacris Amédégnato & Descamps, 1979^{c g}
4. Chlorohippus Bruner, 1911^{c g}
5. Contacris Amédégnato & Descamps, 1979^{c g}
6. Copiocera Burmeister, 1838^{c g}
7. Copiocerina Descamps, 1978^{c g}
8. Copiotettix Descamps, 1984^{c g}
9. Cyphacris Gerstaecker, 1889^{c g}
10. Episcopotettix Rehn, 1903^{c g}
11. Eumecacris Descamps & Amédégnato, 1972^{c g}
12. Hippacris Scudder, 1875^{c g}
13. Monachidium Serville, 1831^{c g}
14. Oncolopha Stål, 1873^{c g}
15. Opshomala Serville, 1831^{c g}
16. Sinop Descamps, 1984

Data sources: i = ITIS, c = Catalogue of Life, g = GBIF, b = Bugguide.net
