= İnceburun Lighthouse =

Lighthouse in the province of Sinop, Turkey

İnceburum Lighthouse İnceburun Feneri
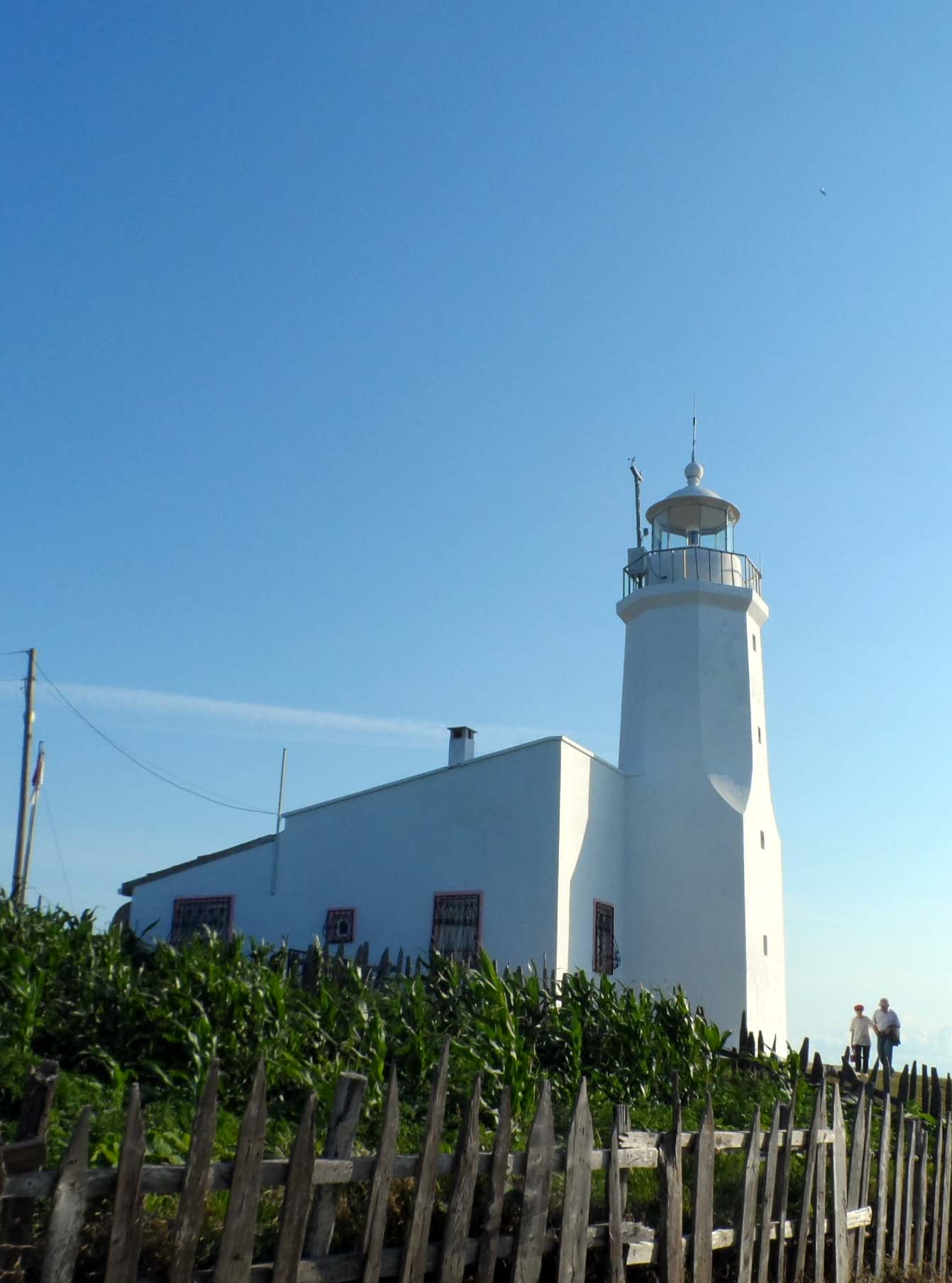
- İnceburun Lighthouse in Sinop Province, Turkey
- Location: Sinop, Turkey
- Coordinates: 42°05′49″N 34°56′42″E

Tower
- Constructed: 1863
- Construction: Stone tower
- Height: 12 m (39 ft)
- Shape: Octagonal prism above square plan base
- Markings: White tower and lantern
- Operator: Directorate General of Coastal Safety

Light
- Focal height: 26 m (85 ft)
- Range: 18 nmi (33 km; 21 mi)
- Characteristic: Fl (4) W 20s.
- Turkey no.: TUR-005, TR-10310

İnceburun Lighthouse (Turkish: İnceburun Feneri) is an active lighthouse on the Black Sea coast in Sinop Province, Turkey.

The masonry lighthouse was constructed in 1863 on İnceburun (lit. 'Sharp Cape'), on the cliffs of the northernmost point of Anatolia. It is situated about 25 km (16 mi) northwest of Sinop. The 12 m (39 ft)-tall lighthouse tower with a gallery around the lantern room has the form of an octagonal prism in the upper half sitting on a square-plan base, and is white painted. A one-story keeper's house is attached to it, and three additional buildings belong to the light station. At a focal height of 26 m (85 ft), it flashes white four times every 20 seconds.

The lighthouse is accessible but the tower is closed to the public. The lighthouse keeping is served by Family Çilesiz, who do the job in fifth generation.
