= Boyabat =

- Municipality
- Location within Turkey
- Coordinates: 41°27′55″N 34°46′15″E
- Country: Turkey
- Province: Sinop
- District: Boyabat

Government
  - Mayor: Hasan Kara (YRP)
- Elevation: 330 m (1,080 ft)
- Population (2022): 29,093
- Time zone: UTC+3 (TRT)
- Postal code: 57200
- Area code: 0368
- Climate: Cfb
- Website: www.boyabat.bel.tr

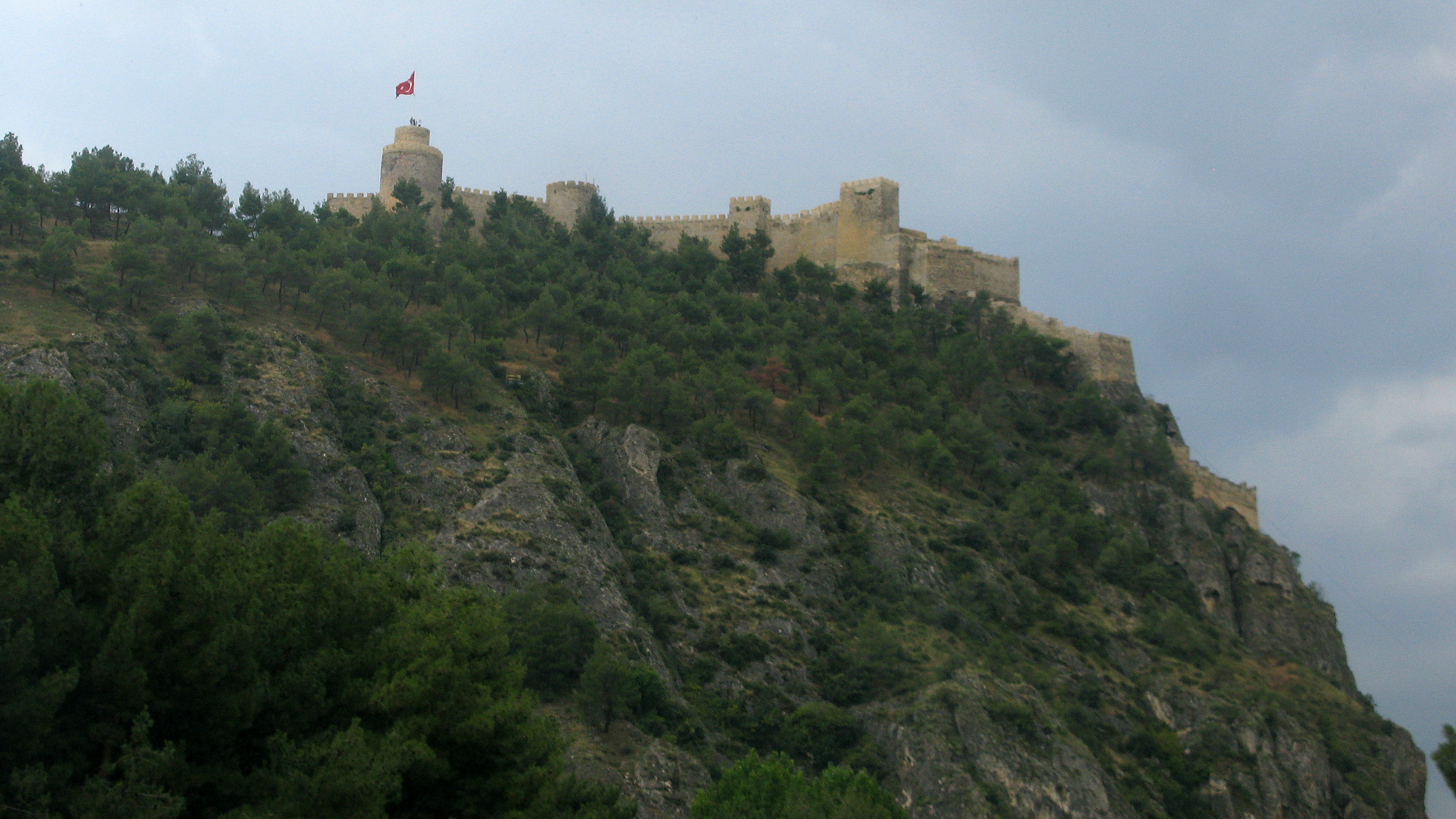
Boyabat Castle

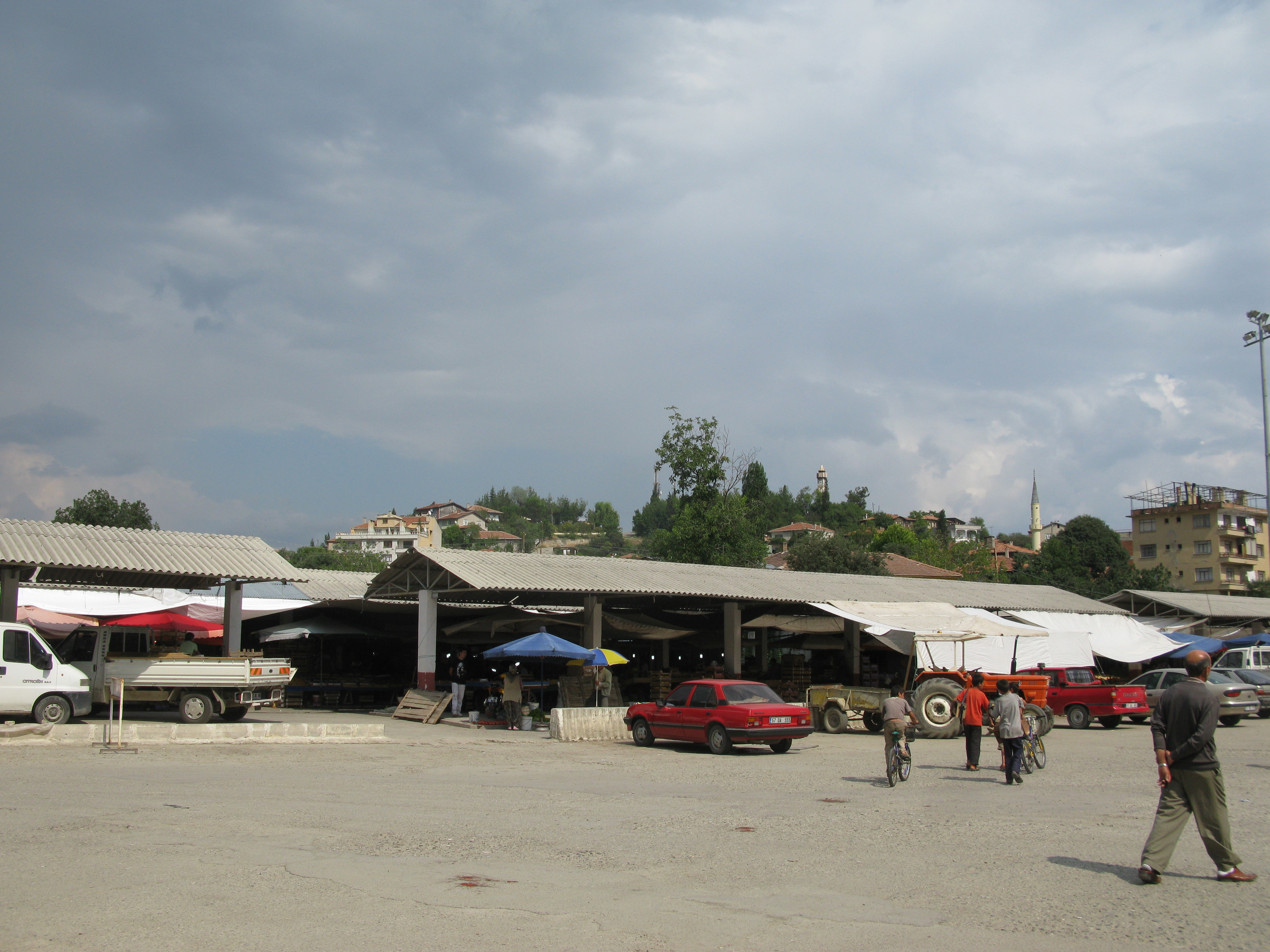
Market of Boyabat

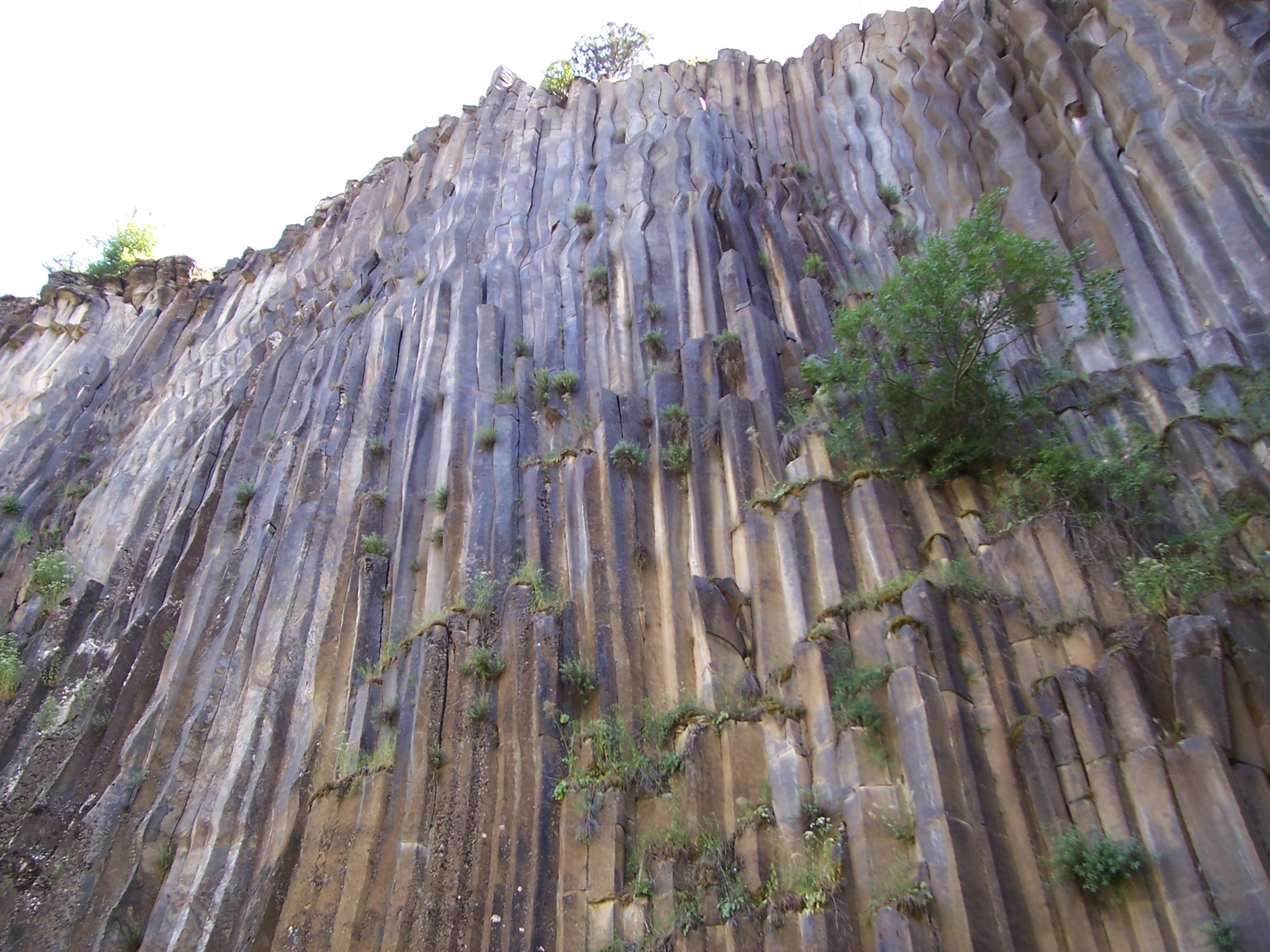
Basalt columns in Boyabat

Boyabat is a town in Sinop Province in the Black Sea region of Turkey. It is the seat of Boyabat District. Its population is 29,093 (2022). The mayor is Hasan Kara (YRP).

The town is in the Gökırmak ("blue river") valley, a river valley parallel to the Black Sea coast, located 100 km south of Sinop over the coastal mountain range, Isfendiyar Mountains.

The town is the trade hub for over a hundred villages around it. Of larger centers nearby, up the Gökırmak valley to the west are Taşköprü, and Kastamonu; down the Gökırmak and later Kızılırmak ("red river") valley to the east you find Durağan, Havza, Vezirköprü, and Samsun.

== Name ==
The name Boyabat is said to consist of "boy" which means border and the Persian suffix "abad" (آباد) which means built/cultivated town/agricultural landscape. It bears witness to the fact that the border between the Byzantine Empire and the empire of the Seljuk Turks was once here.

== History ==
Boyabat town was built below an imposing castle which probably has not been in serious use since around 1300 A.D. but may be as old as 2800 years. Kazdere/Gazidere, a tributary of Gök River, passes through the town. It cuts the rock that the castle is perched on with a dramatic pair of vertical walls. The wall on the castle side has a window on the rock face illuminating descending tunnels to a newly discovered large underground city from Roman times. The tunnels may also have served for water supply and safe passage during siege.

The castle overlooks the Gökırmak valley. This valley is long and lies parallel with the Black Sea coast. Together with the similarly placed Yeşilırmak (river) valley further east, it forms a natural east-west pathway used since the antiquity as a trade route, possibly as part of the silk road. The castle may have served to protect this trade route. Being a suitable distance from Durağan, Hanönü and Taşköprü, it may have provided safe stop for caravans.

The older history of Boyabat may have started from Bronze Age, and it may have been ruled by Kaskians, Hittites, Paphlagonians, Persians, Lydians, Pontus kingdom, and Romans. It served as a border castle between Lydia (later Roman Empire) and the Pontus kingdom a thousand year before it was again a border between Seljuqs and Byzantians.

Since it has been captured a few decades after the Battle of Manzikert (1071) by Gazi Gümüshtigin, the second leader of the Danishmends - a wassal of the Seljuq Sultanate of Rum - the area has been under the rule of several Turkish states (Danishmends, Seljuq Turks, Pervaneoğulları, Jandarids, Ottoman Empire, Turkish Republic) and has been spared from military conflicts and battles on its territory during the last 500 years.

In the late 19th and early 20th century, Boyabat was part of the Kastamonu Vilayet of the Ottoman Empire.

== Today ==
The main income source of the area is agriculture, animal husbandry, and some forest related activities. Of agricultural produce Boyabat is renowned for its rice. Rice fields cover the bottom of Gökirmak and Kizilirmak valleys.

The town boasts some local industry, notably brick, tiles, and ceramic production, unhusking and polishing of rice, and tanning.

Mondays a weekly bazaar is held in Boyabat center and the town overflows with farmers and merchants of the area. A larger several days long yearly event "Panayır" (fair) is held in autumn (starting the second Wednesday of October) just outside town center. It lasts several days and attracts participants from a much larger area.

The local character of Boyabat is reflected in the characteristic old houses below the castle, handwoven traditional scarves popular among the farmer ladies and woodprint scarves among town ladies. Davul and zurna music is the hallmark of weddings. They lead processions through the town carrying gifts to the wedding house. On arrival, the drummer in full traditional drummer outfit performs a drumplaying dance to the music of zurna. Another Boyabat tradition kept alive is the whole grilled lamb kebab served in special restaurants. Village weddings and the Panayır (fair) also include a wrestling championship performed to the tune of davul and zurna, playing non-stop epic "Köroğlu" melodies (typically in five eight rhythm) in the background.

Like every other similar town in Turkey, a large number of people originating from Boyabat now live in large metropolitan centers, mainly Istanbul some 650 km or a 10 hours bus ride away.

During the latest decades Boyabat town itself has also expanded greatly by the building of apartment blocks. The plan of the city is altered by a wide thoroughfare which also attracted arenas of business out from the old shopping district.

The countryside around has also seen dramatic changes. A belt of planted pine forests, a dry canal diverting flash floods away from town center, factories on the plains west of the town etc.

The construction of the Boyabat Dam on the Kızıl River near Duragan (operational since 2012), a tunnel to avoid the highest peak of the mountain pass towards Sinop (operational since 2009) were major infrastructure projects in the area.

== Notable natives ==
- Yusuf Kemal Tengirşenk (1873–1976): Foreign minister of Turkey
- Tayyareci Nuri Bey (1890–1914): Piloting pioneer
- Salih Zeki Bey (1864–1921): Mathematics professor
- Melih Kabasakal Footballer
