= Clematodes vanduzeei =

Scientific classification
- Kingdom: Animalia
- Phylum: Arthropoda
- Clade: Pancrustacea
- Class: Insecta
- Order: Orthoptera
- Suborder: Caelifera
- Family: Acrididae
- Tribe: Clematodini
- Genus: Clematodes
- Species: C. vanduzeei

Binomial name
- Clematodes vanduzeei Hebard, 1923

Species of grasshopper

Clematodes vanduzeei, the papago creosotebush grasshopper, is a species of short-horned grasshopper in the family Acrididae. It is found in North America.

== Subspecies ==
These two subspecies belong to the species Clematodes vanduzeei:

- Clematodes vanduzeei papago Rehn & Eades, 1961
- Clematodes vanduzeei vanduzeei Hebard, 1923
