= Boyabat District =

District of Sinop Province, Turkey

- District
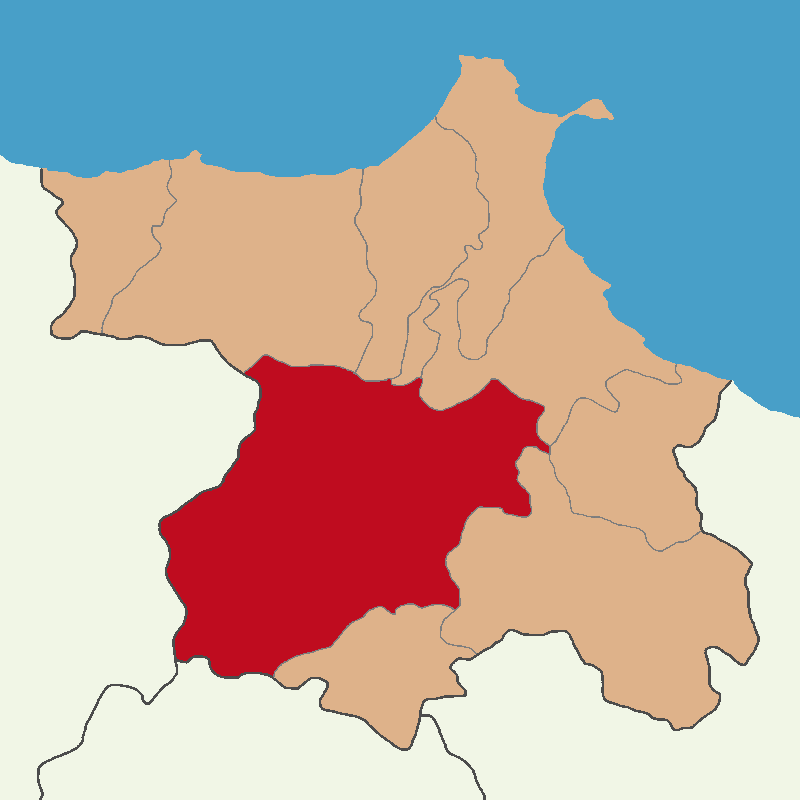
- Map showing Boyabat District in Sinop Province

- Location in Turkey
- Coordinates: 41°28′N 34°46′E
- Country: Turkey
- Province: Sinop
- Seat: Boyabat

Government
  - Kaymakam: Enver Yılmaz
- Area: 1,512 km^{2} (584 sq mi)
- Population (2022): 44,502
  - Density: 29/km^{2} (76/sq mi)
- Time zone: UTC+3 (TRT)
- Website: www.boyabat.gov.tr

Boyabat District is a district of the Sinop Province of Turkey. Its seat is the town of Boyabat. Its area is 1,512 km^{2}, and its population is 44,502 (2022).

== Composition ==
There is one municipality in Boyabat District:

- Boyabat

There are 107 villages in Boyabat District:

- Akçakese
- Akyürük
- Alibeyli
- Ardıç
- Arıoğlu
- Aşağı Seyricek
- Aşıklı
- Aydoğan
- Bağlıca
- Bayamca
- Bektaş
- Bengübelen
- Benişli
- Binerli
- Bölüklü
- Boyalı
- Bürüm
- Büyükkaraağaç
- Çaltı
- Çarşak
- Çatpınar
- Çattepe
- Çaybaşı
- Cemalettinköy
- Çeşnigir
- Çorak
- Çukurhan
- Çulhalı
- Çurkuşlar
- Dağtabaklı
- Darıözü
- Daylı
- Dereçatı
- Dodurga
- Doğrul
- Doğuca
- Düzkaraağaç
- Edil
- Eğlence
- Ekinören
- Emiroğlu
- Engilekin
- Erkeç
- Esengazili
- Esentepe
- Gazidere
- Gazideretabaklı
- Gökçeağaçsakızı
- Gökçukur
- Göve
- Günpınar
- Hacıahmetli
- Hamzalı
- Ilıcaköy
- İmamlı
- İsaoğlu
- Kadınlı
- Karacaören
- Karamusalı
- Kartaloğlu
- Kavacık
- Kavak
- Kayaboğazı
- Keseköy
- Kılıçlı
- Killik
- Koçak
- Köprücek
- Kovaçayır
- Kozanlı
- Kozkule
- Kurtlu
- Kurusaray
- Kuyucakpınar
- Kuzveren
- Mahmutlu
- Maruf
- Marufalınca
- Muratlı
- Oğlakçılar
- Okçumehmetli
- Ömerköy
- Ören
- Osmanköy
- Paşalıoğlu
- Pehlivanlar
- Pirefendideresi
- Salar
- Sarıağaççayı
- Sarıyar
- Şeyhler
- Şeyhli
- Taşhanlı
- Tekke
- Tırnalı
- Uzunçay
- Yabanlı
- Yaylacık
- Yazıköy
- Yenicamili
- Yenikayalı
- Yeniköy
- Yenimehmetli
- Yeşilçam
- Yeşilköy
- Yeşilyurt
- Yukarı Seyricek
