= Çatakgeriş, Türkeli =

Çatakgeriş
- Village
- Location in Turkey
- Coordinates: 41°48′30″N 34°19′43″E
- Country: Turkey
- Province: Sinop
- District: Türkeli
- Population (2022): 119
- Time zone: UTC+3 (TRT)

Çatakgeriş is a village in the Türkeli District of Sinop Province, Turkey. Its population is 119 (2022). It is 130 km from Sinop and 30 km from Türkeli.

== Population ==
Historical population
Year	Pop.	±% p.a.
1997	208	—
2007	73	−9.94%
2012	76	+0.81%
2017	93	+4.12%
2022	119	+5.05%
Source: 1997 census and TÜIK (2007-2022)
