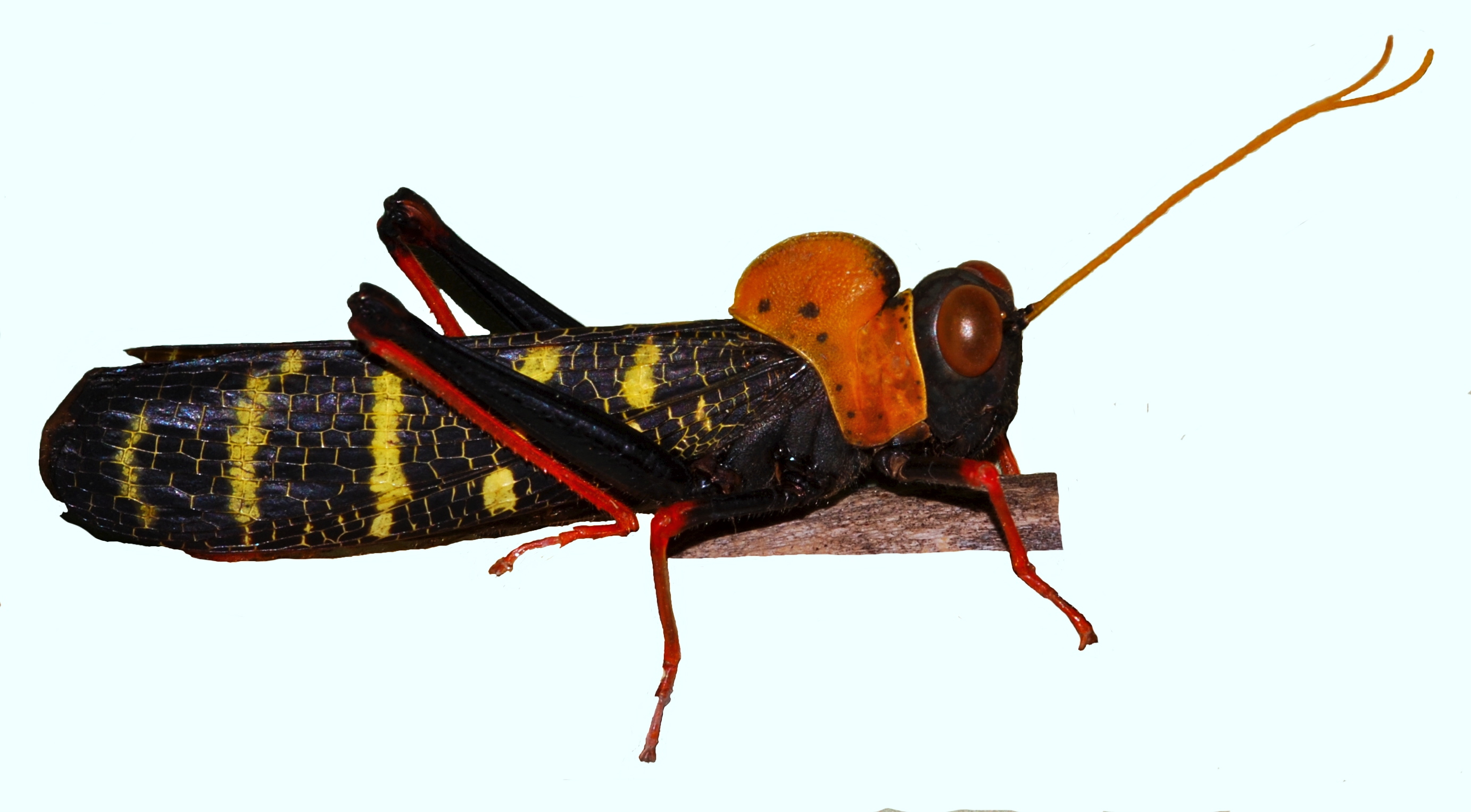
- Male
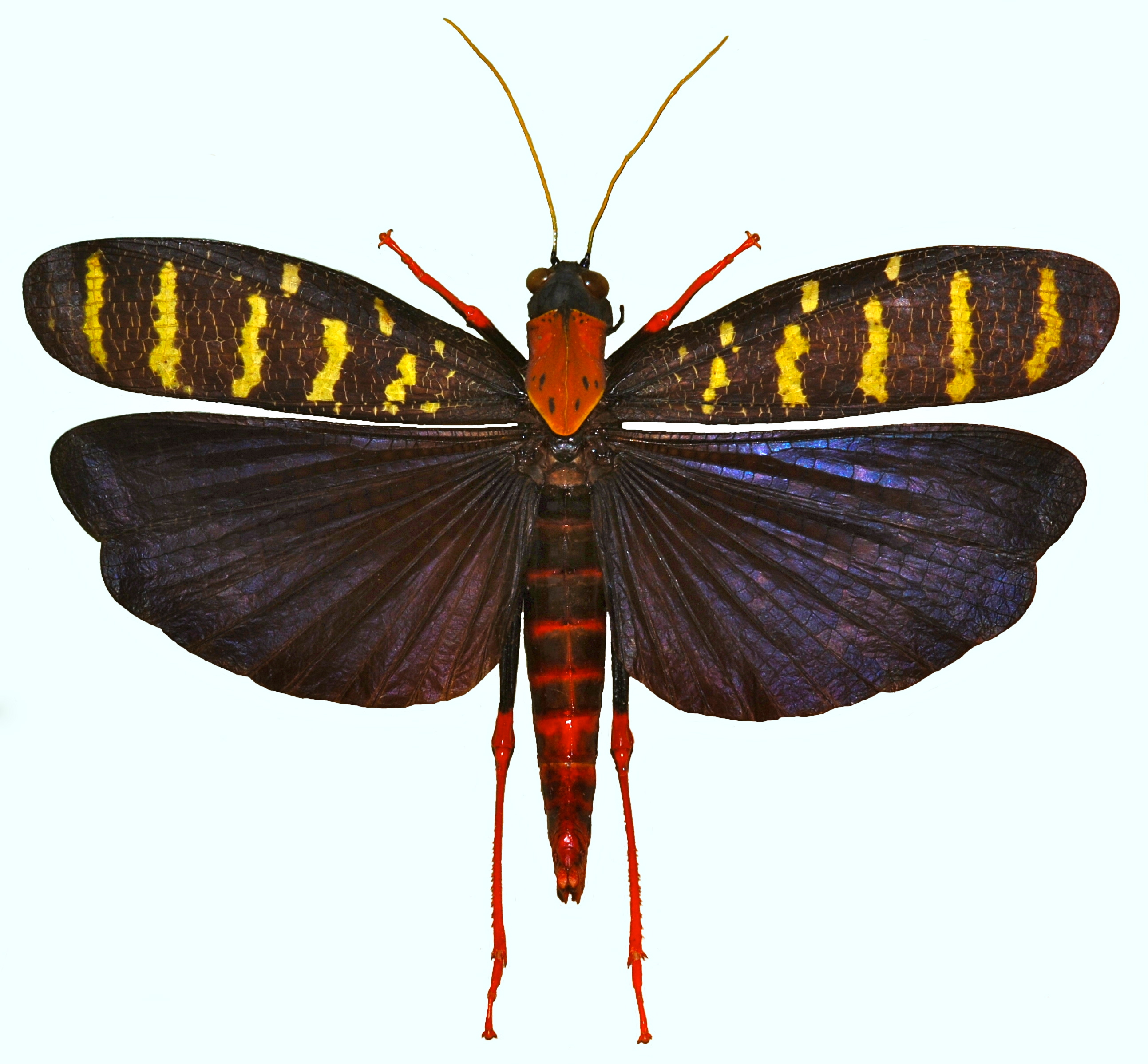
- Female

Scientific classification
- Kingdom: Animalia
- Phylum: Arthropoda
- Clade: Pancrustacea
- Class: Insecta
- Order: Orthoptera
- Suborder: Caelifera
- Family: Acrididae
- Tribe: Copiocerini
- Genus: Monachidium; Serville, 1831
- Species: M. lunum

Binomial name
- Monachidium lunum (Johannson, 1763)

Synonyms
- Acrydium lunum (Johannson, 1763); Gryllus lunus Johannson, 1763; Gryllus mithras Lichtenstein, 1796; Gryllus vexillatus Stoll, C., 1813; Monachidium cristaflammea Perty, J.A.M., 1832; Monachidium flavipes Serville, 1831; Monachidium lunus (Johannson, 1763); Monachidium lunus cristaflammea Perty, J.A.M., 1832; Rhomalea opulentum Gerstaecker, 1889

= Monachidium =

Genus of grasshoppers

Monachidium is a genus of grasshopper belonging to the family Acrididae, containing a single species, the fairly large and aposematically colored Monachidium lunum from tropical South America.

== Description ==
Monachidium lunum is native to the eastern and central Amazon in Brazil and the Guianas. It is a fairly large species, typically around 6 cm (2.4 in) long. These grasshoppers have a bright and contrasting aposematic color pattern. The prothorax is bulbous and high. The head is black and the prothorax is orange or black. The elytra are blackish opaque, with transversal yellow bands. The wings are very dark blue, sometimes metallic violet. The abdomen is red and black. Antennae are yellow. Legs and tarsi are red.
