= Carussa =

Town in ancient Paphlagonia

Coordinates: 41°48′36″N 35°09′32″E

Carussa or Karoussa (Ancient Greek: Κάρουσσα), also spelt as Carusa or Karousa (Καροῦσα), also known as Polichnion, was a Greek trading place (emporium) on the Black Sea coast of ancient Paphlagonia, south of Sinope, and 150 stadia from it. It is also mentioned in the Periplus of Pseudo-Scylax as a Greek city; and by Pliny the Elder. It was a member of the Delian League as it appears in tribute lists of ancient Athens.

It is located near Gerze in Asiatic Turkey.
