= Clematodes larreae =

Scientific classification
- Kingdom: Animalia
- Phylum: Arthropoda
- Clade: Pancrustacea
- Class: Insecta
- Order: Orthoptera
- Suborder: Caelifera
- Family: Acrididae
- Genus: Clematodes
- Species: C. larreae

Binomial name
- Clematodes larreae Cockerell, 1901

Species of grasshopper

Clematodes larreae, the gray creosotebush grasshopper, is a species of short-horned grasshopper in the family Acrididae. It is found in North America.
