= Gerze District =

District of Sinop Province, Turkey

- District
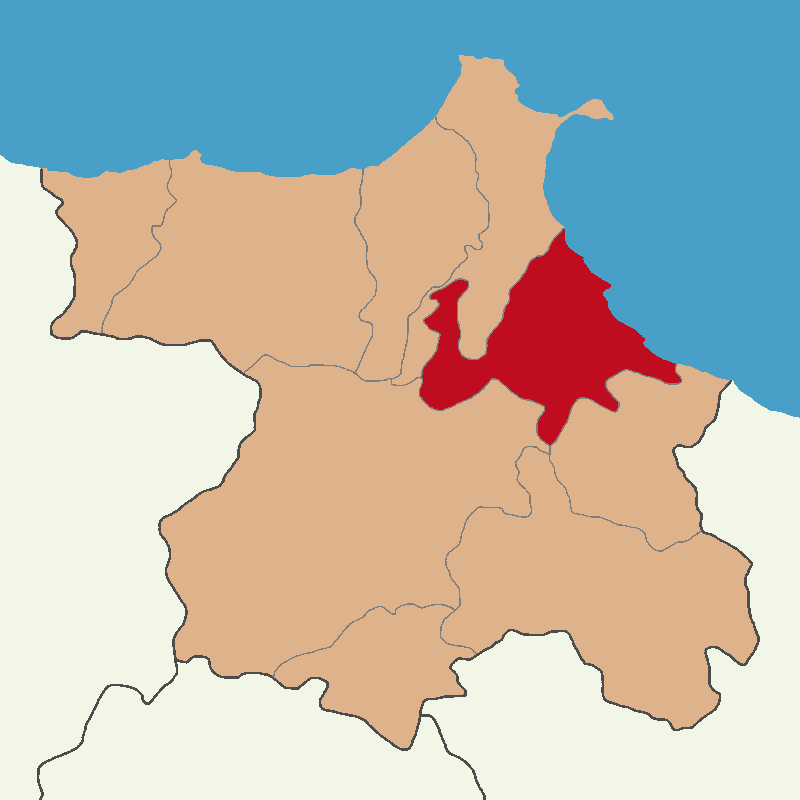
- Map showing Gerze District in Sinop Province

- Location in Turkey
- Coordinates: 41°46′N 35°10′E
- Country: Turkey
- Province: Sinop
- Seat: Gerze

Government
  - Kaymakam: Feyza Nur Kılıç
- Area: 487 km^{2} (188 sq mi)
- Population (2022): 27,967
  - Density: 57.4/km^{2} (149/sq mi)
- Time zone: UTC+3 (TRT)
- Website: www.gerze.gov.tr

Gerze District is a district of the Sinop Province of Turkey. Its seat is the town of Gerze. Its area is 487 km^{2}, and its population is 27,967 (2022).

== Composition ==
There is one municipality in Gerze District:

- Gerze

There are 43 villages in Gerze District:

- Abdaloğlu
- Acısu
- Akgüney
- Akkıraç
- Altınyayla
- Başsökü
- Belören
- Bolalı
- Boyalı
- Boyalıca
- Çağlayan
- Çakallı
- Çeçe
- Çırnık
- Gürsökü
- Güzelyurt
- Hacıselli
- Hıdırlı
- Hizarçayı
- Kabanlar
- Kahramaneli
- Karlı
- Kirençukuru
- Kızılcalı
- Kuzsökü
- Mahmuttırı
- Pirahmet
- Sarımsak
- Sarıyer
- Sarnıçköy
- Sazak
- Şeyhli
- Sorkun
- Tatlıcak
- Tepealtı
- Tokuşlar
- Türkmen
- Türkmenlioğlu
- Yakadibi
- Yamacık
- Yaykıl
- Yenikent
- Yuvalı
