= Ören, Boyabat =

Ören
- Village
- Location within Turkey
- Coordinates: 41°25′04″N 34°39′37″E
- Country: Turkey
- Province: Sinop
- District: Boyabat
- Population (2022): 47
- Time zone: UTC+3 (TRT)

Ören (formerly: Kumarlı) is a village in the Boyabat District of Sinop Province, Turkey. Its population is 47 (2022).
