= Clematodes =

Scientific classification
- Kingdom: Animalia
- Phylum: Arthropoda
- Clade: Pancrustacea
- Class: Insecta
- Order: Orthoptera
- Suborder: Caelifera
- Family: Acrididae
- Subfamily: Copiocerinae
- Tribe: Clematodini
- Genus: Clematodes; Scudder, 1900

Genus of grasshoppers

Clematodes is a genus of North American short-horned grasshoppers in the family Acrididae. There are two described species in Clematodes.

== Species ==
These two species belong to the genus Clematodes:

- Clematodes larreae Cockerell, 1901 (gray creosotebush grasshopper)
- Clematodes vanduzeei Hebard, 1923 (papago creosotebush grasshopper)
