= Dikmen =

- Municipality
- Location within Turkey
- Coordinates: 41°38′20″N 35°15′53″E
- Country: Turkey
- Province: Sinop
- District: Dikmen

Government
  - Mayor: Adnan Acar (AKP)
- Population (2022): 1,230
- Time zone: UTC+3 (TRT)
- Postal code: 57660
- Area code: 0368
- Climate: Cfb
- Website: www.dikmen.bel.tr

Dikmen is a town in Sinop Province in the Black Sea region of Turkey. It is the seat of Dikmen District. Its population is 1,230 (2022).
