= Gerze, Sinop =

Gerze
- Municipality
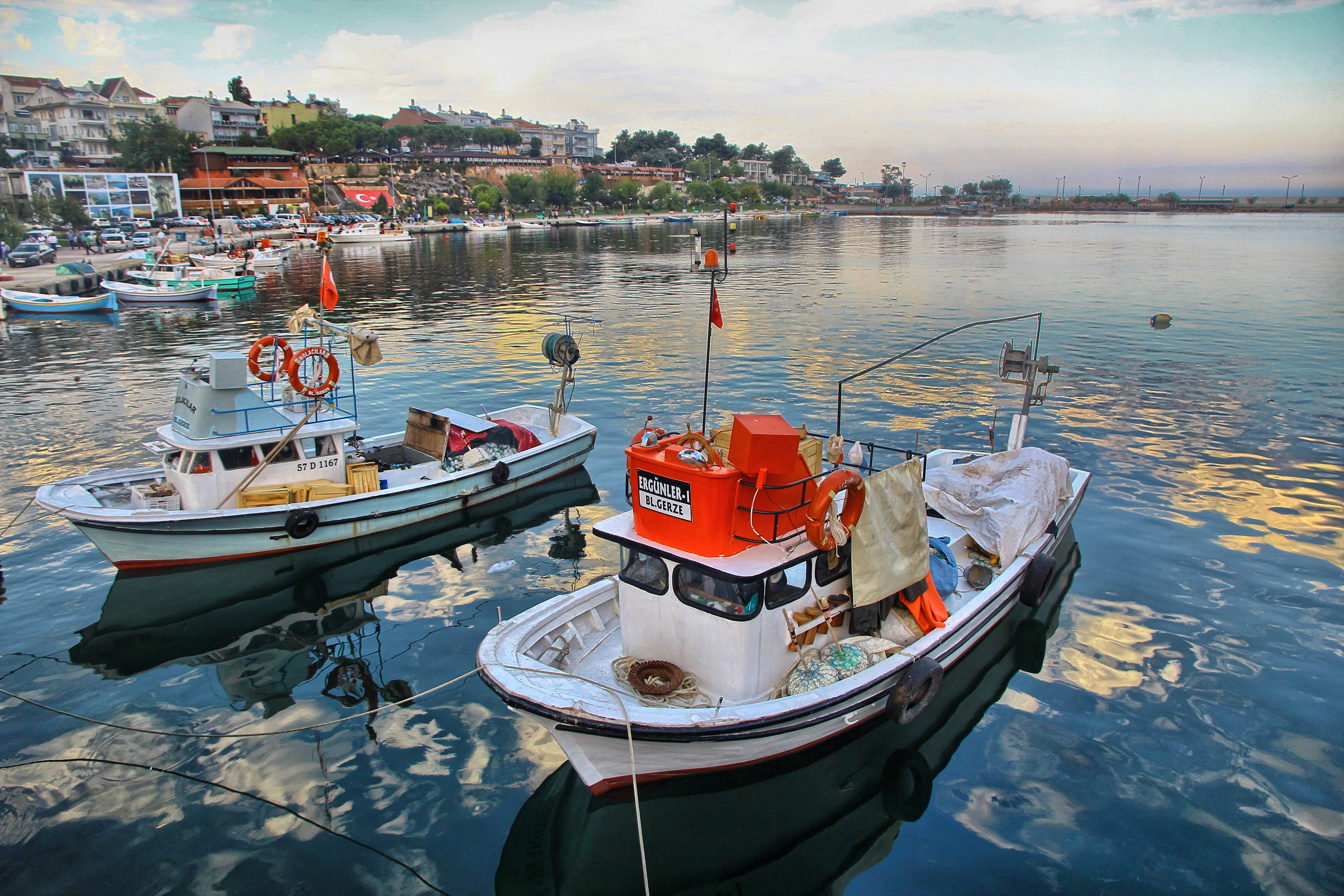

- Location within Turkey
- Coordinates: 41°48′20″N 35°11′53″E
- Country: Turkey
- Province: Sinop
- District: Gerze

Government
  - Mayor: Osman BELOVACIKLI (CHP)
- Population (2022): 19,144
- Time zone: UTC+3 (TRT)
- Postal code: 57600
- Area code: 0368
- Climate: Cfa
- Website: www.gerze.bel.tr

Gerze is a town in Sinop Province in the Black Sea region of Turkey. It is the seat of Gerze District. Its population is 19,144 (2022). It is 49 km east of Sinop and 140 km west of Samsun. It was first settled by the Ionians and was known in antiquity as Carusa. In 2012, the region was subjected to protests and controversy around the proposed construction of a coal power plant, a project that was later withdrawn by the government after a negative environmental impact assessment.

== Region ==
The Çeçe Sultan Tomb, a pilgrimage place, is 15 km from the town. The date of its construction is unknown. The region is noted for its traditional domestic architecture. The regions of Değirmenler and İdemli, and Gazhane Bay are popular excursion places.

In 2017, it was declared a Cittaslow.
