= Governor of Sinop =

Governor of a Turkish Province

Governor of Sinop Sinop Valiliği
- Logo of the Governor of Sinop
- Incumbent; Mustafa Özarslan since August 10, 2023
- Appointer: President of Turkey; On the recommendation of the Turkish government
- Term length: No set term length or limit
- Inaugural holder: Nizamettin Atakur; 1923
- Website: Office of the Governor

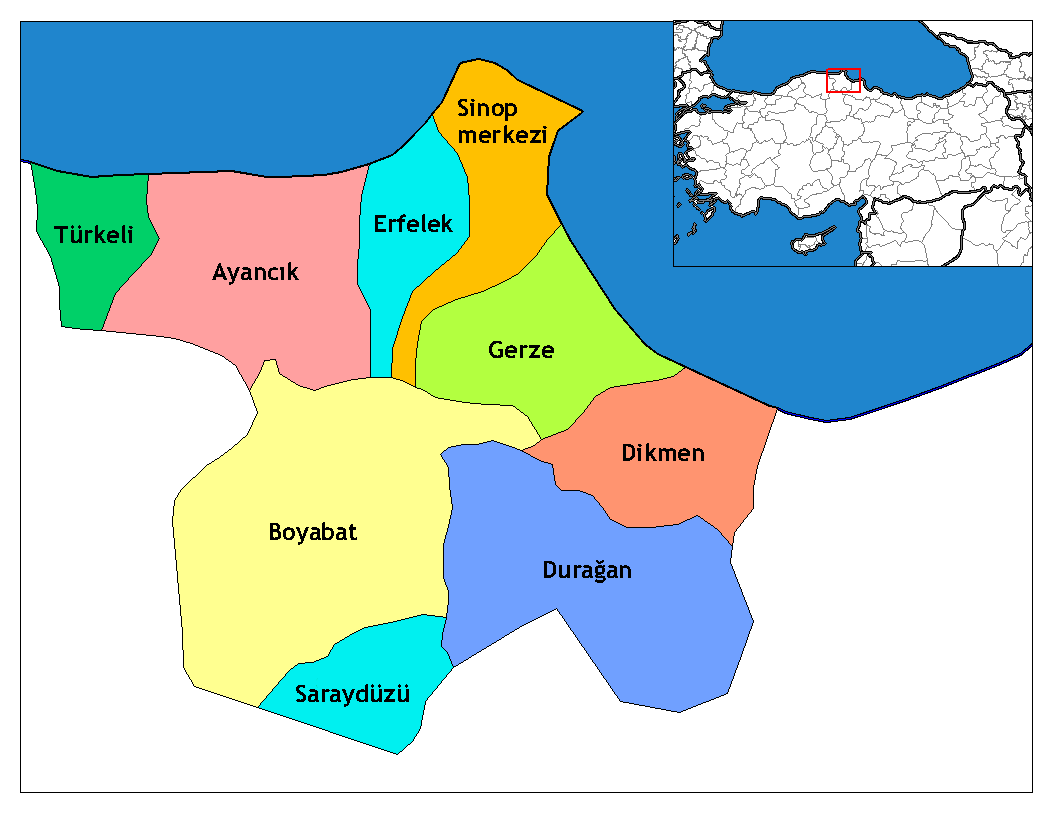
Map of the Province of Sinop, showing the provincial districts.

The Governor of Sinop (Turkish: Sinop Valiliği) is responsible for the implementation of government legislation within Sinop Province, Turkey. The governorship is a civil service office appointed by the government of Turkey. The Governor is also the most senior commander of both the Sinop provincial police force and the Sinop Gendarmerie.

== Appointment ==
The Governor of Sinop is appointed by the President of Turkey, who confirms the appointment after recommendation from the Turkish Government. The Ministry of the Interior first considers and puts forward possible candidates for approval by the cabinet. The Governor of Sinop is therefore not a directly elected position and instead functions as the most senior civil servant in the Province of Sinop.

=== Term limits ===
The Governor is not limited by any term limits and does not serve for a set length of time. Instead, the Governor serves at the pleasure of the Government, which can appoint or reposition the Governor whenever it sees fit. Such decisions are again made by the cabinet of Turkey. The Governor of Sinop, as a civil servant, may not have any close connections or prior experience in Sinop Province. It is not unusual for Governors to alternate between several different Provinces during their bureaucratic career.

== Functions ==
The Governor of Sinop has both bureaucratic functions and influence over local government. The main role of the Governor is to oversee the implementation of decisions by government ministries, constitutional requirements and legislation passed by Grand National Assembly within the provincial borders. The Governor also has the power to reassign, remove or appoint officials a certain number of public offices and has the right to alter the role of certain public institutions if they see fit. Governors are also the most senior public official within the Province, meaning that they preside over any public ceremonies or provincial celebrations being held due to a national holiday. As the commander of the provincial police and Gendarmerie forces, the Governor can also take decisions designed to limit civil disobedience and preserve public order. Although mayors of municipalities and councillors are elected during local elections, the Governor has the right to re-organise or to inspect the proceedings of local government despite being an unelected position.

== List of governors of Sinop ==
- Süleyman Necmi Selmen (1922)
- Zihni Orhon (1922–1923)
- Nizamettin Atakur (1923–1926)
- İbrahim Ethem Aykut (1927–1928)
- Abdulhak Savaş (1933–1935)
- Süreyya Yurdakul (1935–1937)
- Mehmet Naci Kıcıman (1937–1941)
- Salih Rıza Kılıç (1941–1946)
- Sait Kemalî Atay (1946–1948)
- Refik Şahinbaş (1948–1950)
- Nazım Üner (1950–1952)
- Ali Rıza Yaradanakul (1952–1953)
- Eşref Ayhan (1953–1954)
- Hadi Ömür (1954–1955)
- Sait Kemalî Atay (1955–1960)
- Yakup Yücel (1960)
- Sadi Kâzım Süer (1960–1961)
- Cezmi Kartay (1961–1962)
- Ahmet Sadullah Verel (1962–1964)
- Mehmet Aldan (1964–1966)
- Ali Rıza Yaradanakul (1966–1968)
- Fahri Centel (1968–1970)
- Mustafa Kemal Demirtaş (1970–1972)
- Sabahattin Çakmakoğlu (1972–1975)
- Fikret Turgut Sayın (1975–1978)
- Yılmaz Ergun (1978–1979)
- Kenan Güven (1979–1981)
- Hasan Bamyacı (1981–1984)
- M. İlyas Aksoy (1985–1991)
- Adnan Darendeliler (1991–1992)
- Sami Sönmez (1992–1996)
- İsmail Dokuzoğlu (1996–1999)
- Selahattin Başar (1999–2000)
- Ayhan Nasuhbeyoğlu (2000–2001)
- Zeki Şanal (2003–2009)
- Mustafa Hakan Güvençer (2009–2011)
- Ahmet Cengiz (2011–2013)
- Yavuz Selim Köşger (2013–2015)
- Hasan İpek (2016–2018)
- Köksal Şakalar (2018–2020)
- Erol Karaömeroğlu (2020–2023)
- Mustafa Özarslan (2023–)

== See also ==
- Governor (Turkey)
- Sinop Province
- Ministry of the Interior (Turkey)
