= Sinop gracilifemur =

Scientific classification
- Kingdom: Animalia
- Phylum: Arthropoda
- Clade: Pancrustacea
- Class: Insecta
- Order: Orthoptera
- Suborder: Caelifera
- Family: Acrididae
- Subfamily: Copiocerinae
- Tribe: Copiocerini
- Genus: Sinop; Descamps, 1984
- Species: S. gracilifemur

Binomial name
- Sinop gracilifemur Descamps, 1984

Genus of grasshoppers

Sinop gracilifemur is a species of grasshoppers belonging to the tribe Copiocerini. It is the only species in the genus Sinop. It occurs in Brazil.
