= Korucuk, Sinop =

Korucuk
- Neighbourhood
- Location in Turkey
- Coordinates: 42°00′N 35°06′E
- Country: Turkey
- Province: Sinop
- District: Sinop
- Municipality: Sinop
- Elevation: 75 m (246 ft)
- Population (2022): 3,080
- Time zone: UTC+3 (TRT)
- Postal code: 57000
- Area code: 0368

Korucuk is a neighbourhood of the city Sinop of Sinop Province, Turkey. Its population is 3,080 (2022). It is situated only 3 kilometres (1.9 mi) west of the isthmus where the city of Sinop situated. It is so close to Sinop that it is about to merge to the city. A part of Sinop University as well as the bus terminal of Sinop are in Korucuk.
