= Türkeli District =

District of Sinop Province, Turkey

- District
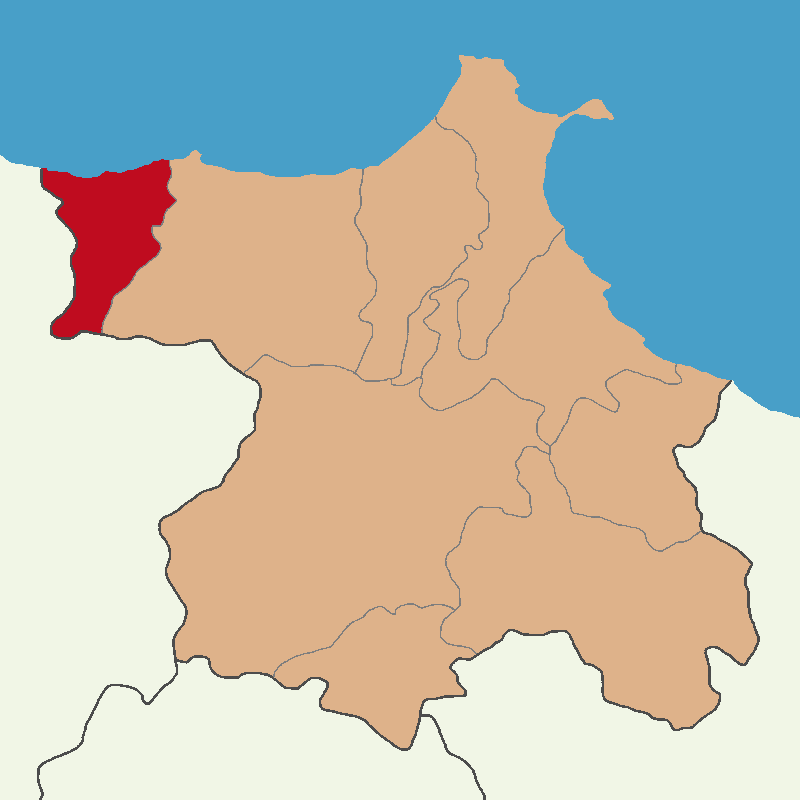
- Map showing Türkeli District in Sinop Province

- Location in Turkey
- Coordinates: 41°55′N 34°20′E
- Country: Turkey
- Province: Sinop
- Seat: Türkeli

Government
  - Kaymakam: Mesut Ozan Yılmaz
- Area: 263 km^{2} (102 sq mi)
- Population (2022): 16,006
  - Density: 61/km^{2} (160/sq mi)
- Time zone: UTC+3 (TRT)
- Website: www.turkeli.gov.tr

Türkeli District is a district of the Sinop Province of Turkey. Its seat is the town of Türkeli. Its area is 263 km^{2}, and its population is 16,006 (2022). Türkeli is one of the districts of Sinop Province that produces walnuts.

== Composition ==
There is one municipality in Türkeli District:

- Türkeli

There are 33 villages in Türkeli District:

- Akçabük
- Alagöz
- Ayaz
- Çatakgeriş
- Çatakgüney
- Çatakörencik
- Direkli
- Düzköy
- Düzler
- Gaziler
- Gencek
- Gökçealan
- Gündoğdu
- Güzelkent
- Hacıköy
- Hamamlı
- Işıklı
- Karabey
- Kayabaşı
- Keş
- Kuşçular
- Kuzköy
- Oymayaka
- Sarmaşık
- Satıköy
- Sazkışla
- Taçahmet
- Taşgüney
- Turhan
- Yapraklı
- Yazıcı
- Yeşiloba
- Yusuflu
