= Ayancık =

- Municipality
- Location within Turkey
- Coordinates: 41°57′N 34°35′E
- Country: Turkey
- Province: Sinop
- District: Ayancık

Government
  - Mayor: Hayrettin Kaya (CHP)
- Population (2022): 13,277
- Time zone: UTC+3 (TRT)
- Postal code: 57400
- Area code: 0368
- Climate: Cfa
- Website: www.ayancik.bel.tr

Ayancık is a town in Sinop Province in the Black Sea region of Turkey. It is the seat of Ayancık District. Its population is 13,277 (2022). The mayor is Hayrettin Kaya (CHP).

== History ==
In the late 19th and early 20th century, Ayancık was part of the Kastamonu Vilayet of the Ottoman Empire. Being the most ideal hilltop in Sinop, Ayancık was the site of a US military radar station from 1951 to 1992 during the Cold War. The radar was finally shut down in 1999 due to its technological obsolescence, and many of the locals migrated to Germany due to unemployment.
