= Sinop (electoral district) =

Electoral district for the Grand National Assembly of Turkey

Coordinates: 41°40′N 35°00′E

- electoral district for the Grand National Assembly of Turkey
- Sinop shown within Turkey
- Province: Sinop
- Electorate: 151,004

Current electoral district
- Created: 1920
- Seats: 2 Historical: 3 (1973-2011) 4 (1961-1973) 6 (1954-1961)
- MPs: List: Mehmet Ersoy AK Party Engin Altay CHP
- Turnout at last election: 86.15%
- Representation
- AK Party: 1 / 2
- CHP: 1 / 2

Sinop is an electoral district of the Grand National Assembly of Turkey. It elects two members of parliament (deputies) to represent the province of the same name for a four-year term by the D'Hondt method, a party-list proportional representation system.

== Members ==
Population reviews of each electoral district are conducted before each general election, which can lead to certain districts being granted a smaller or greater number of parliamentary seats. The number of seats allocated to Sinop has gradually fallen over the last half-century from a high of six in the 1950s to just two seats today.

MPs for Sinop, 1999 onwards
Seat	1999 (21st parliament)	2002 (22nd parliament)	2007 (23rd parliament)	2011 (24th parliament)	June 2015 (25th parliament)
MP	Yaşar Topçu; DYP	Cahit Can; AK Party	Abdurrahman Dodurgalı; AK Party	Mehmet Ersoy; AK Party	Cengiz Tokmak; AK Party
MP	Metin Bostancıoğlu; DSP	Engin Altay; CHP			Barış Karadeniz; CHP
MP	Kadir Bozkurt; Motherland	Mustafa Öztürk; AK Party	Kadir Tıngıroğlu; AK Party	Seat abolished	

== General elections ==
=== 2011 ===
General Election 2011: Sinop
Party	Candidate	Votes	%	±%
AK Party	1 elected ▼1: 1. Mehmet Ersoy ✓; 2. İbrahim Felek ✗	69,587	54.92	▲10.88
CHP	1 elected 0: 1. Engin Altay ✓; 2. Abdullah Şişek ✗	39,264	30.99	▲6.63
MHP	None elected: 1. Metin Oktay Fındık ✗; 2. Nazım Demiray ✗	10,486	8.28	▼4.04
SAADET	None elected: 1. Hüseyin Cavit Üçüncüoğlu ✗; 2. İsmail Teziç ✗	1,445	1.14	▼0.71
HAS Party	None elected: 1. Recep Büyükkayıkçı ✗; 2. Hüseyin Şen ✗	1,336	1.05	▲1.05
DP	None elected: 1. Rahmi Özdemir ✗; 2. Hamdi Kabaer ✗	1,000	0.79	▼8.28
HEPAR	None elected: 1. Fehmi Arslan ✗; 2. Kemal Yılmaz ✗	971	0.77	▲0.77
DSP	None elected: 1. Davut Çalhan ✗; 2. Hilmi Kara ✗	538	0.42	N/A
Labour	None elected: 1. Yaşar Aydın ✗; 2. Ekrem Yıldırım ✗	496	0.39	▼0.07
Büyük Birlik	None elected: 1. Ali Doğan ✗; 2. Ahmet Çetin ✗	402	0.32	▲0.32
DYP	None elected: 1. Gürhan Rahmi Koçbay ✗; 2. Mustafa Çalım ✗	326	0.26	▲0.26
MP	None elected: 1. İsmail Ergün ✗; 2. Halil Ergün ✗	267	0.21	▲0.21
TKP	None elected: 1. Hüseyin Murat Yurttaş ✗; 2. Etkin Bilan Eratalay ✗	245	0.19	▼0.10
Liberal Democrat	None elected: 1. Serdar Aktan ✗; 2. Ayhan Topçu ✗	182	0.14	▼0.28
Nationalist Conservative	None elected: 1. Murat Altın ✗; 2. Çetin Ural ✗	155	0.12	▲0.12
Total votes		126,700	100.00	
Rejected ballots		3,392	2.61	▲1.09
Turnout		130,092	86.15	▲1.24

== Presidential elections ==
=== 2014 ===
Presidential Election 2014: Sinop
Party	Candidate	Votes	%
AK Party	Recep Tayyip Erdoğan	74,181	61.19
Independent	Ekmeleddin İhsanoğlu	44,840	36.99
HDP	Selahattin Demirtaş	2,200	1.81
Total votes		121,221	100.00
Rejected ballots		2,921	2.35
Turnout		124,142	79.04
Recep Tayyip Erdoğan win			
