= Erfelek =

- Municipality
- Location within Turkey
- Coordinates: 41°53′N 34°55′E
- Country: Turkey
- Province: Sinop
- District: Erfelek

Government
  - Mayor: Mehmet Uzun (AKP)
- Population (2022): 4,041
- Time zone: UTC+3 (TRT)
- Area code: 0368
- Climate: Cfb
- Website: www.erfelek.bel.tr

Erfelek is a town in Sinop Province in the Black Sea region of Turkey. It is the seat of Erfelek District. Its population is 4,041 (2022). The mayor is Mehmet Uzun (AKP).
