= Russian ship Sinop =

At least two ships of the Imperial Russian Navy have been named Sinop after the 1853 Russian victory at the Battle of Sinop.

- Russian ship of the line Sinop 135-gun, steam-powered, first-rate ship of the line built during the 1850s and stricken in 1874.
- Russian battleship Sinop - Ekaterina II-class battleship built during the 1880s and scrapped by the Soviets in 1922.
