= Dikmen (surname) =

The surname Dikmen may refer to:

- Aydın Dikmen (1937–2020), Turkish art dealer
- Ayla Dikmen (1944–1990), Turkish female singer
- İlkay Dikmen (born 1981), Turkish female swimmer
- Songül Dikmen (born 1981), Turkish female volleyball player
- Şükriye Dikmen (1918–2000), Turkish painter
- Volkan Dikmen (born 1991), Turkish footballer
