= Dikmen District =

District of Sinop Province, Turkey

- District
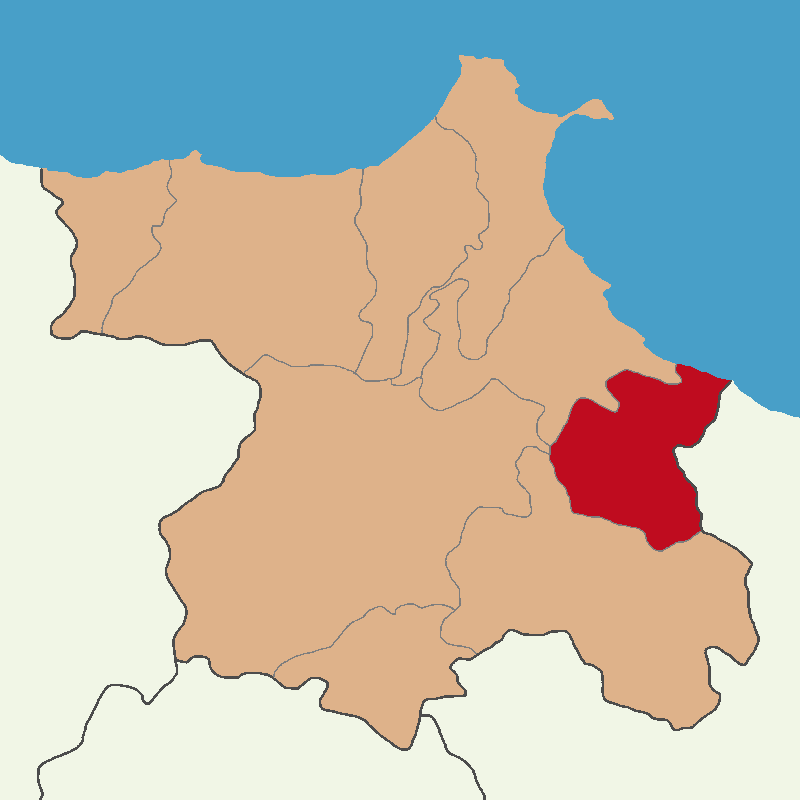
- Map showing Dikmen District in Sinop Province

- Location in Turkey
- Coordinates: 41°38′N 35°16′E
- Country: Turkey
- Province: Sinop
- Seat: Dikmen

Government
  - Kaymakam: Feyza Nur Kılıç
- Area: 411 km^{2} (159 sq mi)
- Population (2022): 4,711
  - Density: 11/km^{2} (30/sq mi)
- Time zone: UTC+3 (TRT)
- Website: www.dikmen.gov.tr

Dikmen District is a district of the Sinop Province of Turkey. Its seat is the town of Dikmen. Its area is 411 km^{2}, and its population is 4,711 (2022).

== Composition ==
There is one municipality in Dikmen District:

- Dikmen

There are 28 villages in Dikmen District:

- Akçakese
- Bucak
- Büyükdağ
- Büyükkızık
- Çanakçı
- Çevikli
- Çukurcaalan
- Dağköy
- Dudaş
- Dumanlı
- Göllü
- Görümcek
- Kadıköy
- Karaağaç
- Karakoyun
- Kerim
- Küçükkızık
- Küplüce
- Kuzalan
- Sarayköy
- Şeyhhüseyin
- Üçpınar
- Yakuplu
- Yaykın
- Yaylabeyi
- Yeniköy
- Yukarıçekmez
- Yumaklı
