= Saraydüzü =

- Municipality
- Location within Turkey
- Coordinates: 41°19′47″N 34°50′50″E
- Country: Turkey
- Province: Sinop
- District: Saraydüzü

Government
  - Mayor: Hasan Peker (AKP)
- Population (2022): 1,288
- Time zone: UTC+3 (TRT)
- Area code: 0368
- Climate: Cfb
- Website: www.sarayduzu.bel.tr

Saraydüzü is a town in Sinop Province in the Black Sea region of Turkey. It is the seat of Saraydüzü District. Its population is 1,288 (2022). The mayor is Hasan Peker (AKP).
