= Durağan =

- Municipality
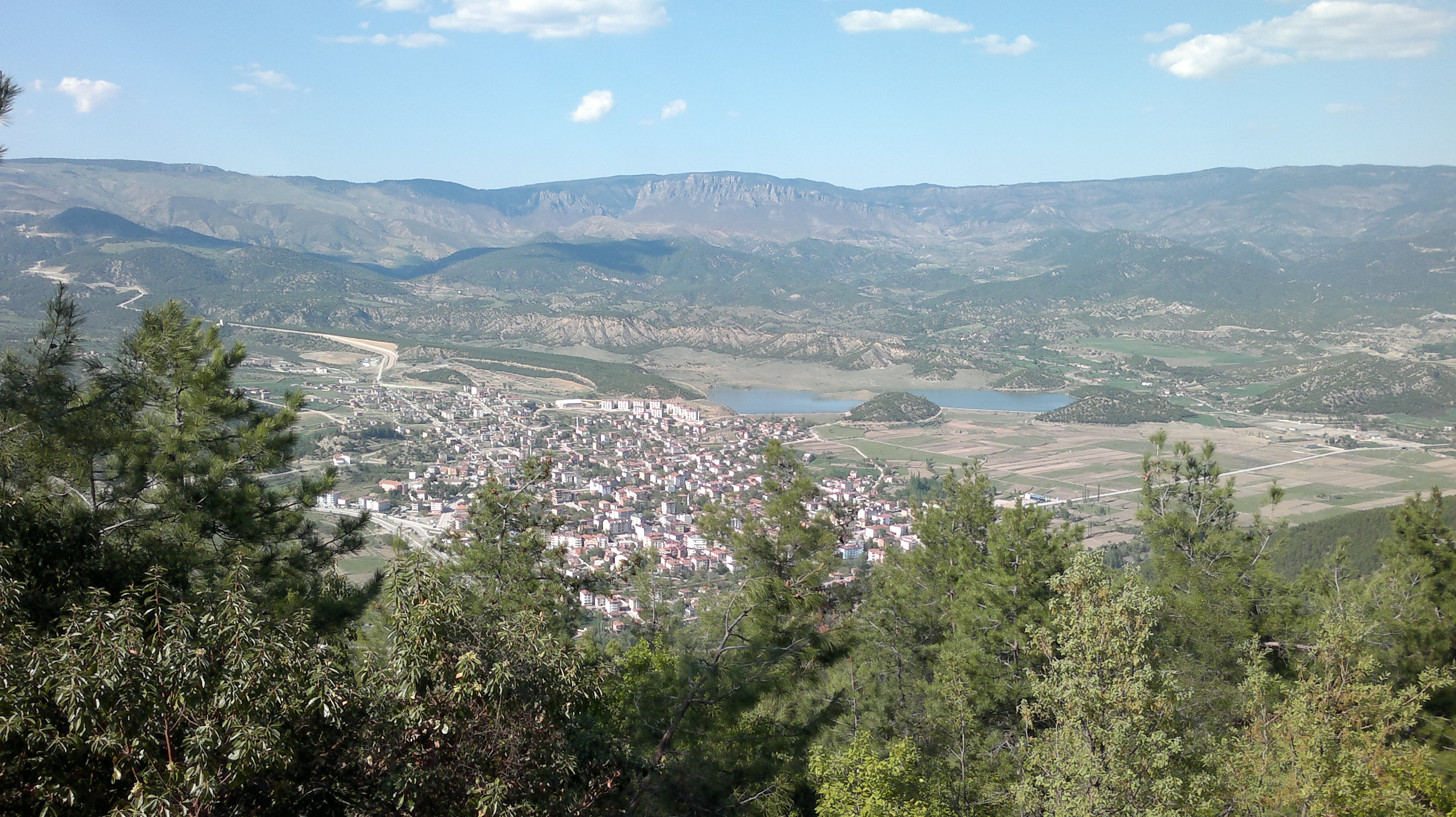
- Durağan in 2012

- Location within Turkey
- Coordinates: 41°25′N 35°03′E
- Country: Turkey
- Province: Sinop
- District: Durağan

Government
  - Mayor: Ahmet Kılıçaslan (AKP)
- Population (2022): 7,494
- Time zone: UTC+3 (TRT)
- Postal code: 57700
- Area code: 0368
- Climate: Cfb
- Website: www.duragan.bel.tr

Durağan is a town in Sinop Province in the Black Sea region of Turkey. It is the seat of Durağan District. Its population is 7,494 (2022).

The town is at the location where Kızıl River joins its tributary the Gök just before crossing the last mountain range northwards to the Black Sea.

Rice farming in the fertile river valley has been the engine of economical activity of the town. The construction of two dams (Boyabat Dam (2012), Altınkaya Dam (1988)) have given Durağan two lakes instead of rice fields.

The name of the town is an altered version of the name of a building from 13th century for overnight stay of caravans, Durak Han, literally "station house" in Turkish. Another possible explanation is that the name originates from "Dura Han" where Dura is the name of a ravine nearby (Dura Deresi) down from a plateau dominating the two river valleys.

Gökırmak valley runs east west and constitutes a portion of the Silk Road, together with a series of similar river valleys running east–west around 100 km inland from Black Sea coast.

Durağan has a past reaching into the antiquity being the nearest town to possibly world's oldest underwater tunnel, Terelek Kaya tuneli, a few kilometers downstream on the Kızıl River, now the upper part of a dam lake. Carved rock face graves, and a mine nearby might be from similar periods in antiquity. The chemicals from the mine might have been shipped to Cyprus for use in very early copper production.

Durağan has also a cave, Buzluk Mağarası, that naturally produces ice during summer time, near the villages of Bayatsekisi and Sarnıkalıncası, about 13 km from town.
