= Türkeli =

- Municipality
- Location within Turkey
- Coordinates: 41°56′55″N 34°20′12″E
- Country: Turkey
- Province: Sinop
- District: Türkeli

Government
  - Mayor: Veysel Şahin (AKP)
- Population (2022): 6,560
- Time zone: UTC+3 (TRT)
- Postal code: 57900
- Area code: 0368
- Climate: Cfa
- Website: www.turkeli.bel.tr

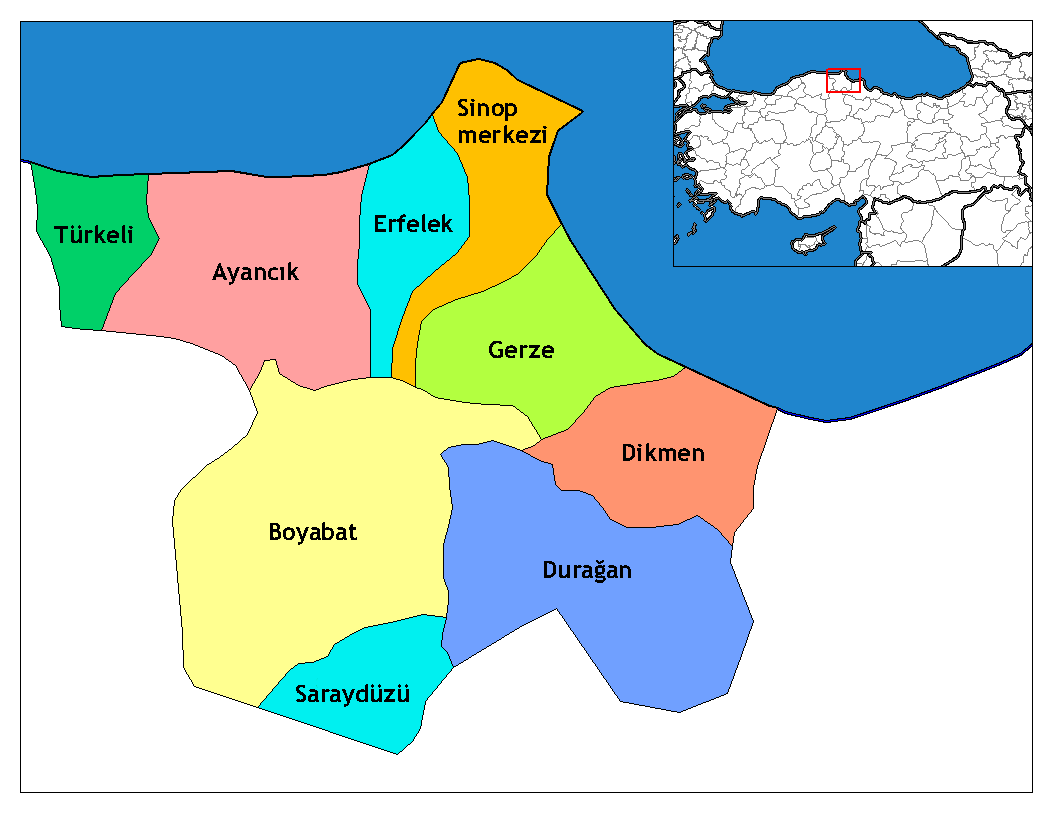
Map of the Sinop province; Türkeli is located in the west.

Türkeli is a town in Sinop Province in the Black Sea region of Turkey. It is the seat of Türkeli District. Its population is 6,560 (2022). Many natives of the town have emigrated to Germany, Austria, Belgium and France. The mayor is Veysel Şahin (AKP).
