= Sinop Province =

Province of Turkey

Coordinates: 42°00′N 35°00′E

Sinop Province Sinop ili
- Province
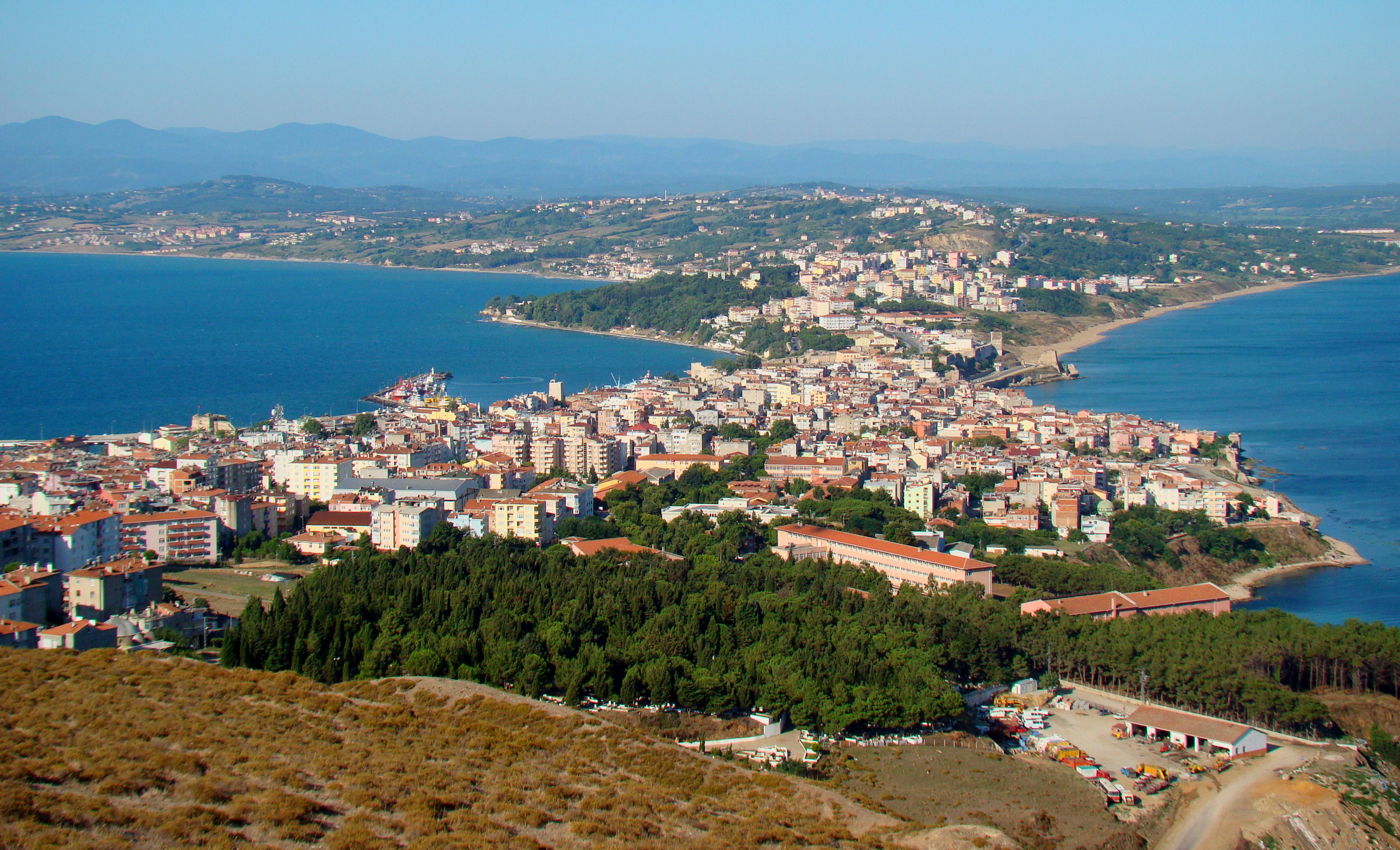
- Sinop

- Location of the province within Turkey
- Country: Turkey
- Seat: Sinop

Government
  - Governor: Mustafa Özarslan
- Area: 5,717 km^{2} (2,207 sq mi)
- Population (2022): 220,799
  - Density: 38.62/km^{2} (100.0/sq mi)
- Time zone: UTC+3 (TRT)
- Area code: 0368
- Website: www.sinop.gov.tr

Sinop Province (Turkish: Sinop ili) is a province of Turkey, along the Black Sea. It is located between 41 and 42 degrees North latitude and between 34 and 35 degrees East longitude. Its area is 5,717 km^{2}, equivalent to 0.73% of Turkey's total area, and its population is 220,799 (2022). The borders total 475 km and consists of 300 km of land and 175 km seaside borders. Its adjacent provinces are Kastamonu on the west, Çorum on the south, and Samsun on the southeast.

The capital of Sinop Province is the coastal city Sinop. The city situated at Black Sea coast, Sinop was renowned for its picturesque harbors, the notable landmarks are Sinop Fortress and Sinop Fortress Prison.

== Geography ==
=== Rivers ===
Kızılırmak, Gökırmak, Sarsak çay, Karasu, Ayancık Suyu, Tepeçay, Çakıroğlu, Kanlıdere

=== Lakes ===
Sülüklü, Sarıkum

=== Bays ===
Hamsilos Bay

=== Districts ===
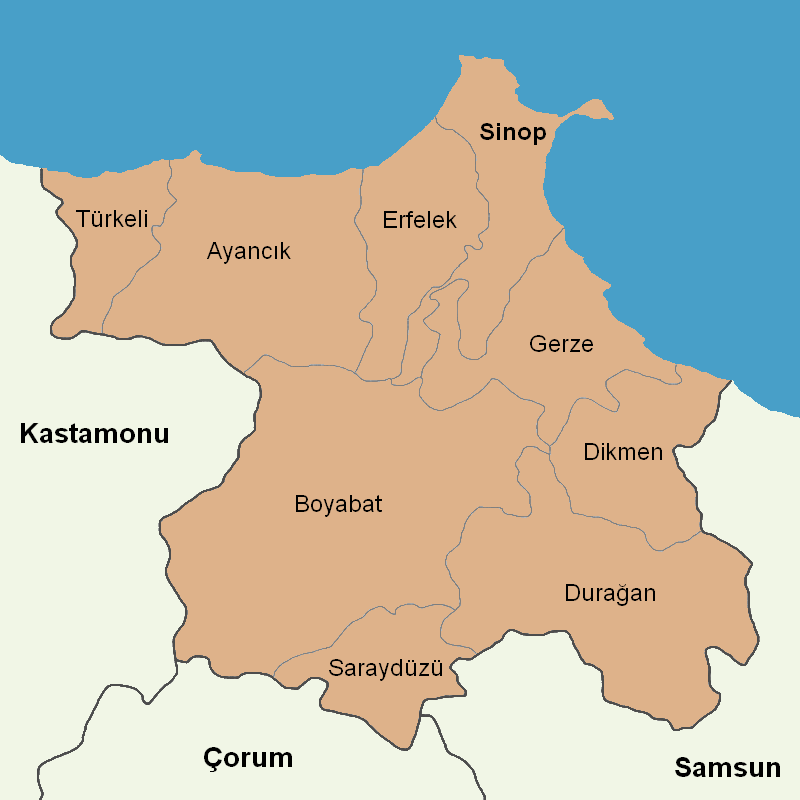

Sinop province is divided into 9 districts (capital district in bold):

- Ayancık
- Boyabat
- Dikmen
- Durağan
- Erfelek
- Gerze
- Saraydüzü
- **Sinop**
- Türkeli

== History ==
It was part of Kastamonu Vilayet during the late Ottoman period.
