= Kurdish Freedom and Democracy Alliance =

Kurdish Freedom and Democracy Alliance Kürt Özgürlük ve Demokrasi İttifakı Tifaqa Azadî û Demokrasiyê ya Kurd
- Founded: 3 April 2023
- Ideology: Factions: Kurdish minority rights Democratic socialism Left-wing nationalism Regionalism
- Political position: Left-wing
- Members: Peoples' Democratic Party; Peoples' Equality and Democracy Party; Democratic Society Congress; Democratic Regions Party; Azadi Party; Revolutionary Democratic Kurdish Association; People and Freedom Party; Communist Party of Kurdistan; Socialist Party of Kurdistan
- Colors: Green and purple

The Kurdish Freedom and Democracy Alliance (Turkish: Kürt Özgürlük ve Demokrasi İttifakı, KÖDİ; Kurdish: Tifaqa Azadî û Demokrasiyê ya Kurd, TADK) is an alliance of Kurdish political parties in Turkey founded on 3 April 2023 ahead of the 2023 Turkish general election.

== History ==
On 3 April 2023, in Diyarbakir, nine Kurdish parties led by the Peoples' Democratic Party and the Green Left Party announced the creation of an alliance. The alliance called for voting for the Green Left Party in the parliamentary election, saying that "the 14 May 2023 elections are a historic opportunity to restore democracy in Turkey and resolve the Kurdish issue". The parties also called for the release of all political prisoners and called on the government to "end the isolation" of imprisoned Kurdistan Workers' Party leader Abdullah Öcalan and other political prisoners in Turkey.

== Composition ==
Party	Abbr.	President	Position	Seats
Peoples' Equality and Democracy Party; Partiya Wekhevî û Demokrasiya Gelan	DEM Parti	Tülay Hatimoğulları; Tuncer Bakırhan	Centre-left to left-wing	57 / 600
Democratic Regions Party; Partiya Herêman a Demokratîk	DBP	Çiğdem Kılıçgün Uçar; Keskin Bayındır	Left-wing	2 / 600
Peoples' Democratic Party; Partiya Demokratîk a Gelan	HDP	Cahit Kırkazak; Sultan Özcan	Centre-left to left-wing	0 / 600
Freedom Party; Azadi Partisi; Partiya Azadî	AP	Ayetullah Aşiti	Centre-right	0 / 600
People and Freedom Party; Partiya Insan û Azadî	PİA	Mehmet Kamaç	Centre-left	0 / 600
Communist Party of Kurdistan; Partiya Komunistê Kurdistan	KKP	Sinan Çiftyürek	Far-left	0 / 600
Socialist Party of Kurdistan; Partiya Sosyalîst a Kurdistan	PSK	Bayram Bozyel	Left-wing	0 / 600
Non-governmental organizations
Democratic Society Congress; Kongreya Civaka Demokratîk	DTK	Leyla Güven; Berdan Öztürk	Left-wing	
Revolutionary Democratic Kurdish Association; Komeleya Şoreşgerên Demokratên Kurd	DDKD	Abdulhey Okumuş	Left-wing	

== See also ==
- Kurdish Political Movement in Turkey
- Labour and Freedom Alliance
- Peoples' Democratic Congress
