= Enes Hocaoğulları =

Turkish human rights activist (born 2002)

- Born: 2002 (age 23–24); Ankara, Turkey
- Occupation: Human rights defender
- Known for: Activism and arbitrary prosecution

Enes Hocaoğulları (born 2002) is a Turkish human rights defender. He gained international attention for a speech delivered at the Council of Europe and the subsequent arbitrary arrest he faced upon returning to Turkey, which drew widespread condemnation. The arrest was criticized by domestic and international political figures, human rights organizations, and members of the public. Hocaoğulları continues his work as a human rights advocate.

== Biography ==
Enes Hocaoğulları grew up in Ankara and studied psychology, political science, and international relations at TOBB University of Economics and Technology. In interviews, Hocaoğulları has said that his interest in politics began at an early age and that he initially became engaged in activism through climate justice before focusing on democracy, youth participation, and LGBTI+ rights.

Since 2024, Hocaoğulları has served as the International Advocacy Coordinator at the Ankara based non-governmental organization, ÜniKuir. His work focuses on rights based diplomacy and democratization. Through this position, he represented the youth rights and LGBTI+ rights movements of Turkey before European institutions and international human rights mechanisms.

In 2025, Hocaoğulları was selected as Turkey's youth delegate to the Council of Europe Congress of Local and Regional Authorities. During the 48th session of the Congress in Strasbourg, he delivered a speech on democratic backsliding in Turkey, referring to the arrest of Istanbul Mayor Ekrem İmamoğlu, restrictions on freedom of assembly, and police violence against protesters. The speech attracted widespread attention internationally, receiving extensive coverage in domestic and foreign media, eventually resulting in three legal investigations being conducted against Hocaoğulları.

=== Prosecution ===
Ankara Public Prosecutor's Press Crimes Bureau and Istanbul Public Prosecutor's Terror Crimes Bureau both started separate investigations into Hocaoğulları, which subsequently merged into one investigation led by prosecutors in Ankara. On 5 August 2025, Hocaoğulları was detained at Ankara Esenboğa Airport after returning to Turkey from France and was arrested by a duty magistrate. He was immediately sent to the Sincan Penal Execution Institutions, better known to the public as Sincan Prison.

On 8 August, the Ankara Public Prosecutor issued an indictment against Hocaoğulları under articles 216 and 217/A of the Turkish Penal Code: "Incitement to hatred and hostility or degrading the public" and "Public dissemination of misleading information". Hocaoğulları's lawyers appealed the decision, but the court upheld the indictment and ordered the continuation of Hocaoğulları's ongoing pretrial detention.

Hocaoğulları's first hearing at the Ankara 86th Criminal Court of First Instance took place on 8 September 2025. According to media reports, the hearing was attended by members of parliament from the CHP and DEM Party, representatives of institutions including the European Union and the Council of Europe, the French Ambassador for LGBTI+ Rights, diplomats from European embassies, civil society representatives, activists, and members of the press. In his defense, Hocaoğulları argued that his speech was protected under the right to freedom of expression, highlighted both factual and translation errors in the indictment, and explained why the allegations that he posed a flight risk or might tamper with evidence had no basis in reality. The court ordered Hocaoğulları's release under judicial control measures.

Hocaoğulları's second hearing took place on 23 February 2026. In his defense; he described the physical, psychological, and sexual violence he had allegedly experienced in prison, argued that the judicial control measures imposed were unnecessary, and reaffirmed his commitment to continuing human rights advocacy. The court ultimately accepted his argument that his speech was protected under the right to freedom of expression and acquitted him of all charges.

=== Response ===
Hocaoğulları's prosecution drew widespread condemnation from international institutions, elected officials, and civil society organisations across Europe. In a joint communication sent to the Turkish government, UN Special Rapporteurs Irene Khan, Gina Romero, Mary Lawlor, and Graeme Reid stated that Hocaoğulları's detention contradicted the Council of Europe's objectives and Turkey's international human rights obligations.

Within the Council of Europe, Congress President Marc Cools described the prosecution as "scandalous and unacceptable" while Commissioner for Human Rights Michael O'Flaherty called for Hocaoğulları's immediate release and for the protection of freedom of expression and human rights defenders. On International Youth Day, the Council of Europe described his arrest as "deeply concerning", stating that "youth voices must be protected, not silenced". The Advisory Council on Youth also issued a statement of solidarity.

From the European Union, MEP Nacho Sánchez Amor, President of the European Economic and Social Committee Oliver Röpke, and dozens of Members of the European Parliament (including Alessandro Zan, Dario Nardella, and 31 signatories of a joint statement led by Lucia Yar) called for Hocaoğulları's release. The EU Delegation to Turkey and the EU Delegation to the Council of Europe also publicly addressed the case. Support was further expressed by members of the Parliamentary Assembly of the Council of Europe, the European Democratic Party, Europe Écologie Les Verts, local elected officials in Paris, London, Stockholm, and Angers, and the French Ambassador for LGBTI+ Rights.

Numerous international organisations, including Amnesty International, Front Line Defenders, the European Youth Forum, ILGA Europe, and IGLYO, as well as youth councils from Turkey, Germany, and Lithuania, issued statements in support. A joint declaration was also signed by several Norwegian human rights organisations, while EuroPride and ten Pride organisations from across Europe jointly condemned the prosecution.

Within Turkey, the prosecution was criticised by parliamentarians from multiple opposition parties, including Sevilay Çelenk, Murat Emir, Mahmut Tanal, Gökçe Gökçen, Sevda Karaca, Aysu Bankoğlu, Namık Tan, Yunus Emre, Gülistan Kılıç Koçyiğit, Meral Danış Beştaş, Kezban Konukçu, Seyit Torun, Suat Özçağdaş, Bilal Bilici, Hasan Öztürkmen, Suzan Şahin, Yüksel Taşkın, Sibel Suiçmez, and Özgül Saki. Additional support came from senior officials from CHP and representatives of the Istanbul and Ankara Bar Associations.

=== Subsequent activism ===
Following his release from prison, Hocaoğulları continued his international advocacy work and participated in international conferences and human rights forums across Europe; speaking on youth participation, democracy, civic space, and freedom of expression. He has described his advocacy as centred on dialogue and coalition building across political and social differences. In interviews following his acquittal, he stated that his experiences in prison reinforced his belief that political polarization in Turkey can be overcome through personal interaction and mutual respect.

On 12 September 2026, the 7th Criminal Judgeship of Peace in Istanbul issued a ruling that blocked multiple LGBTQ+ websites and social media accounts, including that of Hocaoğulları and ÜniKuir.
