= Murder of Deniz Poyraz =

Murder in Turkey

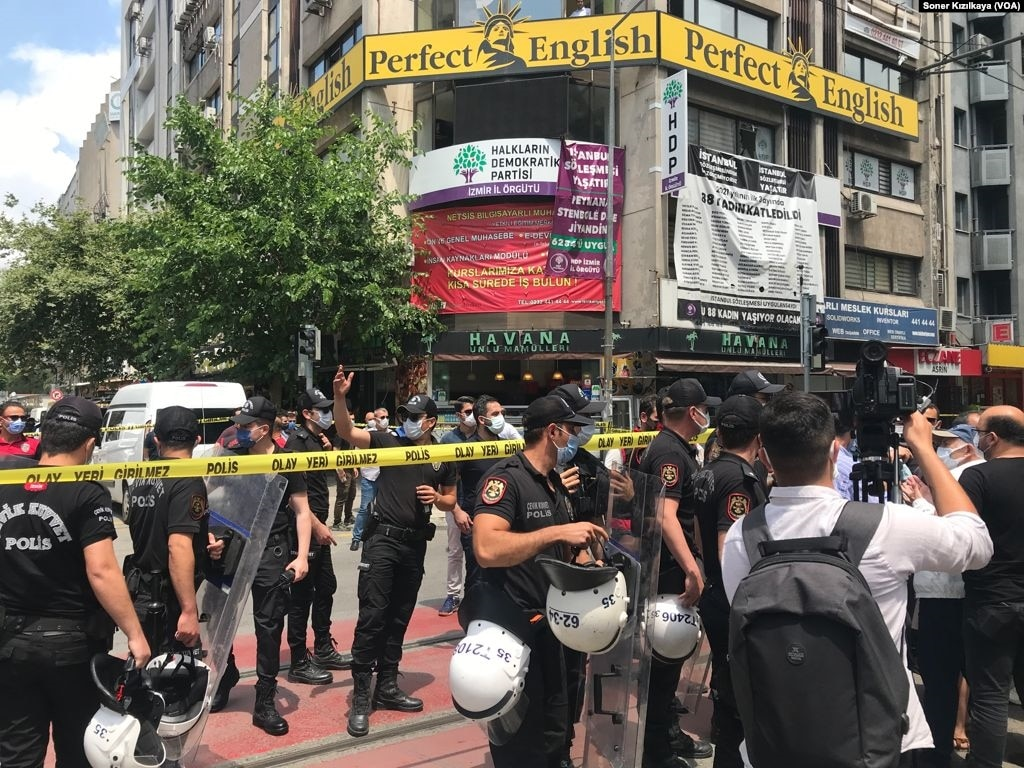

On the 17 June 2021, Deniz Poyraz, a 38-year-old member of the Peoples' Democratic Party (HDP) was killed in the provincial seat of the party in Konak, Izmir which was under police surveillance. In December 2022, the murderer was sentenced to an aggravated life imprisonment.

== Background ==
The Turkish Government often accused the HDP of organizational ties with the Kurdistan Workers' Party (PKK), with the Turkish President Recep Tayyip Erdogan calling HDP politicians terrorists. The attack was executed at the same time as the HDP is threatened with a closure case. The assailant wanted to kill PKK militants for months and found out about the location of the HDP headquarters in January 2021 and stayed in hotels near the building before the attack. In May 2021, he purchased a Ruger gun he used during the attack. According to Serpil Kemalbay, the assault took place while the police was outside the party headquarters.

=== Victim ===
Deniz Poyraz was born in 1983 in İzmir as the eldest of nine siblings to a Kurdish family from Tavuklu village, Mardin. Soon after her birth the family returned to Mardin, where according to an interview some family members gave to human rights media Bianet, the family's home was several times raided. The family eventually returned to Izmir when Deniz was twelve years of age. In Izmir, she worked in the textile industry and as a secretary for some time. At the time of the attack she volunteered in the HDP building, covering a shift for her mother who had undergone hand surgery.

== Killing ==
The assailant entered the party headquarters in the morning hours, the Governors office assumed that the assailant shot Poyraz at about 11.05 a.m, while HDP MP from Izmir Serpil Kemalbay mentions 11.50 a.m. as the time the assailant shot Poyraz. He carried with him the Ruger pistol containing ten bullets and also shot at an image of the imprisoned HDP MP Sebahat Tuncel. According to Kemalbay, the assault took place while the police was outside the party headquarters. Before the assailant killed Poyraz, he attempted to set the building on fire.

=== Assailant ===
According to information from the Turkish authorities, the murderer is a former health worker. The assailant posted several images of his on social media on which he is seen carrying weapons while being in Syria, notably Manbij and Aleppo, while undergoing a military training given by SADAT, an Islamist paramilitary organisation with close ties with governing Justice and Development Party. On some images, he is also seen flashing the sign of the far-right Grey Wolves, which are closely affiliated with the Nationalist Movement Party (MHP). After the assailant was captured, he alleged that he was not affiliated to any group and shot around randomly in the building. He blamed his hate towards the Kurdistan Workers' Party (PKK) for the attack, and reasoned he would have killed more if they had been in the building.

Sedat Peker, a mafia boss making allegations about Turkish politicians and numerous government engagements in illegal activities through his own YouTube channel, claimed that the attack had been planned by the Turkish government and Mehmet Ağar, a former politician who has strong ties with the government of Turkey and allegedly the deep state in Turkey. Peker also claimed that such or bigger terrorist attacks will continue to happen, in order to create a chaotic atmosphere within Turkey.

=== Burial ===
From the Cemetery Directorate in Tepecik, Poyraz' coffin, followed by crowds was brought to the house of Poyraz' family in the Bağkuyu neighbourhood. From there the procession headed to the Kadifekale Mosque in which the funeral ceremony was held. Later the same day, she was buried in the cemetery in Buca. The HDP party co-chairs Mithat Sancar and Pervin Buldan addressed the crowds at the funeral. Deniz Poyraz had three imprisoned brothers of which two were also permitted to attend the funeral.

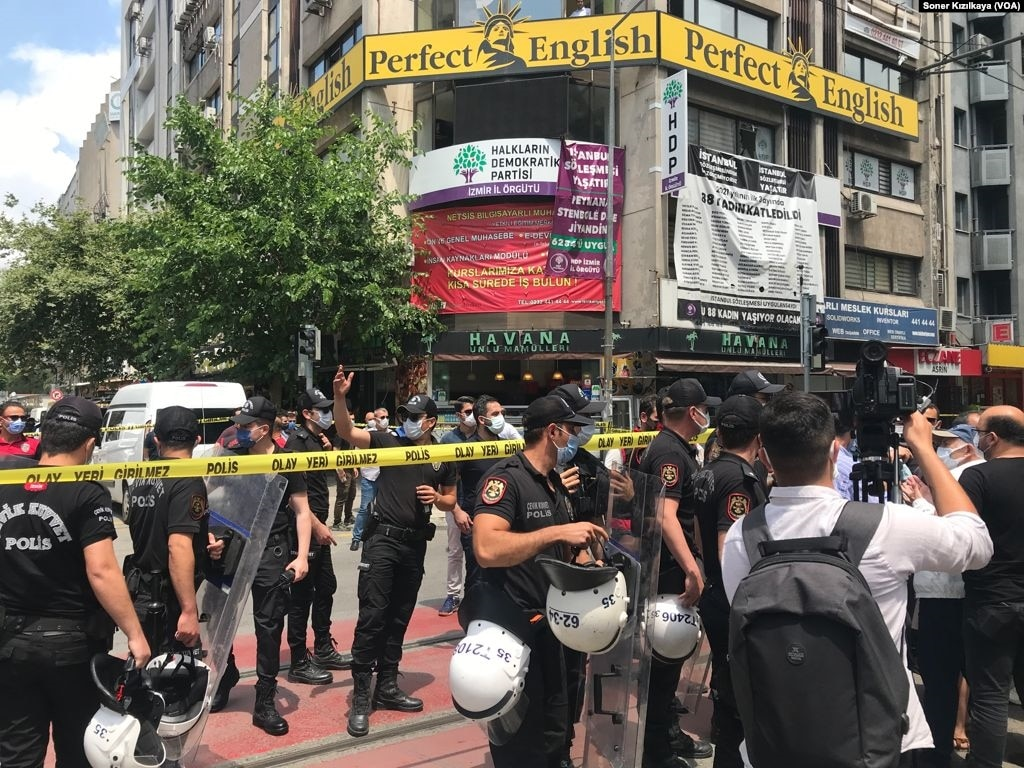
The HDP headquarters of Izmir

== Investigations ==
The following day after the attack, it was reported that the police has erased the footage of several surveillance cameras in the neighborhood of the HDP building. The body of Poyraz was taken to the Forensic Medicine Institution for the autopsy and from there to the Cemetery Directorate in Tepecik. The autopsy report states that Poyraz was struck by several bullets coming from a firearm. According to Mezapotamya, Gencer spoke to two people over the mobile phone, before surrendering. Deniz Poyraz father was prosecuted for terror propaganda for having compared his daughter to the Kurds killed by Turkish security forces and said that she was a “martyr” of all Kurds.

== Trial ==
The first hearing of the case was in December 2021. In the fifth hearing which was adjourned, the gendarmery slapped a brother of the victim and the police used tear gas to calm the crowds at the hearing. In the final hearing in December 2022, the assailant was sentenced to life imprisonment. The defendant's lawyers were not present at the hearing as they refused to go through an X-ray check.

== Reactions ==
=== Political ===
In a party statement the HDP blamed the Turkish Government and the Ministry of the Interior led by the Justice and Development Party (AKP) for the attack on their party building. HDP co-chair Mithat Sancar announced that a meeting of forty participants was cancelled ahead of the attack. The left-wing Labour Party (EMEP) demanded to know who had the power to allow the assailant to perpetrate such an attack. Meral Danış Beştaş blamed the attack on the fact that former assailants were handed down lenient sentences like rewards. Several left wing parties like the Socialist Refoundation Party (SYKP) blamed the alliance of the AKP and the MHP for the hostile environment in which the HDP has found itself. The Turkish president Recep Tayyip Erdogan, Meral Akşener of the Good Party (IYI), Kemal Kilıcdaroğlu of the Republican People's Party (CHP), and the former prominent AKP politician and current president of the Democracy and Progress Party (DEVA) Ali Babacan all condemned the attack. Devlet Bahçeli of the Nationalist Movement Party (MHP) instead called for an investigation as to whether the PKK was responsible for the attack and deemed the victim a terrorist responsible for the recruitment of PKK militants. EU Ambassador to Turkey Nikolaus Meyer-Landrut was received by the HDP party Co-Chairs at the HDP Headquarters in Ankara during a visit he made together with politicians of the left wing political spectrum and representatives of worker unions.

=== Society ===
The satirical magazines Leman and Uykusuz both issued a front page in memory of the attack. Several Turkish worker unions including the Turkish Medical Association sent their representatives to a joint visit at the HDP Headquarters in Ankara.
