= Adana (electoral district) =

Electoral district for the Grand National Assembly of Turkey

Coordinates: 37°50′N 34°45′E

- electoral district for the Grand National Assembly of Turkey
- Adana shown within Turkey
- Province: Adana
- Electorate: 1,526,827

Current electoral district
- Created: 1920
- Seats: 15
- Turnout at last election: 86.03%
- Representation
- AK Party: 5 / 15
- CHP: 4 / 15
- HDP: 2 / 15
- MHP: 2 / 15
- İYİ: 2 / 15

Adana is an electoral district of the Grand National Assembly of Turkey. It elects fourteen members of parliament (deputies) to represent the province of the same name for a four-year term by the D'Hondt method, a party-list proportional representation system.

== Members ==
Population reviews of each electoral district are conducted before each general election, which can lead to certain districts being granted a smaller or greater number of parliamentary seats. Adana has elected fourteen MPs since 1999.

MPs for Adana, 1999 onwards
Election	2002 (22nd parliament)	2007 (23rd parliament)	2011 (24th parliament)	June 2015 (25th parliament)	November 2015 (26th parliament)
MP	Abdullah Çalışkan; AK Party	Necdet Ünüvar; AK Party			
MP	Ömer Çelik; AK Party			Fatma Güldemet Sarı; AK Party	
MP	Recep Garip; AK Party	Fatoş Gürkan; AK Party		Sadullah Kısacık; AK Party	
MP	Ali Küçükaydın; AK Party			Talip Küçükcan; AK Party	
MP	Vahit Kirişçi; AK Party		Mehmet Şükrü Erdinç; AK Party		
MP	Ayhan Zeynep Tekin; AK Party	Dengir Mehmet Fırat; AK Party	Mehmet Necati Çetinkaya; AK Party	Rıdvan Turan; HDP	Tamer Dağlı; AK Party
MP	Abdullah Torun; AK Party	Hulusi Güvel; CHP	Murat Bozlak; Independent	Meral Danış Beştaş; HDP	
MP	Ziyattin Yağcı; AK Party	Mustafa Vural; CHP	Ali Demirçalı; CHP	İbrahim Özdiş; CHP	
MP	Tacidar Seyhan; CHP		Turgay Develi; CHP	Aydın Uslupehlivan; CHP	
MP	Nevin Gaye Erbatur; CHP		Osman Faruk Loğoğlu; CHP	Zülfikar İnönü Tümer; CHP	
MP	Uğur Aksöz; CHP	Kürşat Atılgan; MHP	Ümit Özgümüş; CHP	Elif Doğan Türkmen; CHP	
MP	Atilla Başoğlu; CHP	Muharrem Varlı; MHP			
MP	Kemal Sağ; CHP	Seyfettin Yılmaz; MHP	Recai Yıldırım; MHP	Mevlüt Karakaya; MHP	
MP	Mehmet Ziya Yergök; CHP	Yılmaz Tankut; MHP	Ali Halaman; MHP	Seyfettin Yılmaz; MHP	

=== 1983–2002 ===
MPs for Adana, 1983–2002
Election	1983 (17th Parliament)	1987 (18th Parliament)	1991 (19th Parliament)	1995 (20th Parliament)	1999 (21st Parliament)
MP	Nurettin Yağanoğlu; ANAP	Yılmaz Hocaoğlu; ANAP		Mehmet Ali Bilici; ANAP	
MP	Ledin Barlas; ANAP		Turgut Tekin; DYP	İmren Aykut; ANAP	Musa Öztürk; ANAP
MP	Ahmet Remzi Çerçi; ANAP	Mehmet Ali Bilici; ANAP	Ahmet Şanal; DYP	Uğur Aksöz; ANAP	Recai Yıldırım; MHP
MP	Ahmet Akgün Albayrak; ANAP		Ali Yalçın Öğütcan; DYP	Orhan Kavuncu; ANAP	Ali Halaman; MHP
MP	Ahmet Şevket Gedik; ANAP	Ersin Koçak; ANAP	Mustafa Küpeli; DYP		Adnan Fatin Özdemir; MHP
MP	Yılmaz Hocaoğlu; MDP	Mehmet Perçin; ANAP	Veli Andaç Durak; DYP		Mehmet Metanet Çulhaoğlu; MHP
MP	Mehmet Erdal Durukan; MDP	İbrahim Öztürk; ANAP	Bekir Sami Daçe; DYP	İbrahim Cevher Cevheri; DYP	Mehmet Halit Dağlı; DYP
MP	Nuri Korkmaz; HP	Mehmet Halit Dağlı; DYP			Ali Tekin; DSP
MP	Vehbi Batuman; HP	Mehmet Selahattin Kılıç; DYP		Tuncay Karaytuğ; DSP	İsmet Vursavuş; DSP
MP	Metin Üstünel; HP	Orhan Şendağ; DYP		İbrahim Yavuz Bildik; DSP	
MP	Coşkun Bayram; HP	Mehmet Can; SHP	Uğur Aksöz; DYP	Mehmet Büyükyılmaz; DSP	Tayyibe Gülek; DSP
MP	İbrahim Cüneyt Canver; HP / SHP		İbrahim Özdiş; SHP	Arif Sezer; DSP	
MP	No seat	Mahmut Keçeli; SHP	Timuçin Savaş; SHP	Cevdet Akçalı; RP	Ali Gören; FP
MP	No seat	Abdullah Sedat Doğan; SHP	Muhammet Kaymak; SHP	Yakup Budak; RP / FP	
MP	No seat			Sıtkı Cengil; RP	Seat abolished
MP	No seat			İbrahim Ertan Yülek; RP	Seat abolished
MP	No seat			Erol Çevikçe; CHP	Seat abolished

== General elections ==
=== 2011 ===
2011 general election: Adana
Party	Candidate	Votes	%	±%
AK Party	6 elected 0: 1. Ömer Çelik ✓; 2. Mehmet Necati Çetinkaya ✓; 3. Necdet Ünüvar ✓; 4. Fatoş Gürkan ✓; 5. Ali Küçükaydın ✓; 6. Mehmet Şükrü Erdinç ✓; 7. Fatma Güldemet Sarı ✗; 8. Ali Çaldır ✗; 9. Talat Ulussever ✗; 10. Tamer Dağlı ✗; 11. Ali Yüzükcu ✗; 12. Neslihan İpek Kobaner ✗; 13. Mustafa Özkozanoğlu ✗; 14. Ebubekir Akdeniz ✗	438,321	37.40	▲0.51
CHP	4 elected 0: 1. Osman Faruk Loğoğlu ✓; 2. Ümit Özgümüş ✓; 3. Turgay Develi ✓; 4. Ali Demirçalı ✓; 5. Zeynep Canan Billor ✗; 6. Hüseyin Keser ✗; 7. Arif Sezer ✗; 8. Rıza Mete ✗; 9. Müzeyyen Şevkin ✗; 10. Mehmet Salıcı ✗; 11. Doğa Çiğdemoğlu ✗; 12. Orhan Toklu ✗; 13. Murat Öztanrıöver ✗; 14. Soner Anafarta ✗	361,547	30.85	▲8.02
MHP	3 elected ▼1: 1. Recai Yıldırım ✓; 2. Muharrem Varlı ✓; 3. Ali Halaman ✓; 4. Seyfettin Yılmaz ✗; 5. Cahit Öztok ✗; 6. Mehmet Metanet Çulhaoğlu ✗; 7. Kürşat Atılgan ✗; 8. Türkan Cengiz Yılmaz ✗; 9. Süleyman Şimşir ✗; 10. Demet Çardak ✗; 11. Mehmet Külahlıoğlu ✗; 12. Gökay Sarılı ✗; 13. Neslihan Uzun ✗; 14. Hamit Yılmaz ✗	238,140	20.32	▼2.59
Independent	1 elected ▲1: Murat Bozlak ✓ Candemir Mansuroğlu ✗ Hayrettin Çavuşoğlu ✗ Osman Akgün ✗ Hakan Bülent Yardımcı ✗ Mustafa Süha ✗	93,169	7.95	▼2.03
SAADET	None elected: 1. Yakup Budak ✗; 2. Tuncay Özgünen ✗; 3. Muhammet Çelebi Keyhıdır ✗; 4. Hasan Şaybak ✗; 5. Süleyman Şenogul ✗; 6. Mehmet Işık ✗; 7. Alaattin Tekin ✗; 8. İsmail Aktaş ✗; 9. Ayşe Topal ✗; 10. Hacıevli Topatan ✗; 11. Zeki Kayak ✗; 12. Şule Tıraş ✗; 13. Mehmet Demir ✗; 14. Cengiz Kayadan ✗	11,078	0.95	▼0.61
Büyük Birlik	None elected: 1. Ahmet Şahin ✗; 2. Rifat Örek ✗; 3. Mustafa Şahin ✗; 4. Ülkü Dilek Kartal ✗; 5. Abdullah Sığar ✗; 6. Fatma Gezer ✗; 7. Elif Tuygun ✗; 8. Bahadır Özön ✗; 9. Mehmet Aktaş ✗; 10. Soner Özkozanoğlu ✗; 11. Ümmügülsüm Durhasan ✗; 12. Arif Özler ✗; 13. Zübeyde Gündoğdu ✗; 14. Hüseyin Zengin ✗	6,885	0.59	▲0.25
DP	None elected: 1. Yakup Bulut ✗; 2. Mehmet Emin Koç ✗; 3. Kemal Akar ✗; 4. Serhan Güngör ✗; 5. Mahsuni Çiçek ✗; 6. Çiğdem Akça ✗; 7. Jale Hiçyakmazer ✗; 8. Ahmet Oskar Haznadar ✗; 9. Nimet Şahin ✗; 10. Mirac Müge Direk ✗; 11. Zühal Ustok ✗; 12. Mehmet Akyürek ✗; 13. Arif Döker ✗; 14. İbrahim Aldemir ✗	6,436	0.55	▼4.73
HAS Party	None elected: 1. İbrahim Ertan Yülek ✗; 2. Fatma Küçükoğlu ✗; 3. Ömer Atamer ✗; 4. Mehmet Yıldız ✗; 5. Burhanettin Hattısarı ✗; 6. Sadık Acı ✗; 7. Mehmet Selim Özer ✗; 8. Cihan Daşkın ✗; 9. İlknur Küçükgöde ✗; 10. Oğuzhan Batmaz ✗; 11. Mehmet Kul ✗; 12. Ethem Ceylan ✗; 13. Ahu Kevser Avşar ✗; 14. Ahmet Akcan ✗	5,265	0.45	▲0.45
HEPAR	None elected: 1. Mehmet Yalçın Öndüç ✗; 2. Murat Çiçek ✗; 3. Hüseyin Bozkurt ✗; 4. Atilla Güvenç ✗; 5. İsmet Çabuk ✗; 6. Yüksel Ataş ✗; 7. Erhan Uzun ✗; 8. Mehmet Orhan Özaltun ✗; 9. Emin Sezer ✗; 10. Ülkü Çiçek ✗; 11. Taner Aksoy ✗; 12. Cüneyt Kaya ✗; 13. Mustafa Caner Seylan ✗; 14. Süheyla Özer ✗	2,183	0.19	▲0.19
MP	None elected: 1. Hasan Demircioğlu ✗; 2. Ramazan Dönmez ✗; 3. Osman Arslan ✗; 4. Ali Örün ✗; 5. Ali Gül Efeoğlu ✗; 6. Noman Tufan ✗; 7. Arif Topallar ✗; 8. Zeki Yıldız ✗; 9. Ahmet Yaşayan ✗; 10. Ali Şirin ✗; 11. Zeynal Abidin İzci ✗; 12. Süleyman Göycıncık ✗; 13. Ahmet Örün ✗; 14. Zeki Kabcı ✗	2,178	0.18	▲0.18
DSP	None elected: 1. Şenol Pektaş ✗; 2. Bedir Baydan ✗; 3. Saniye Arslantaş ✗; 4. Ercan Akarpınar ✗; 5. Mümtaz Numanoğlu ✗; 6. Nuran Dalyan ✗; 7. Leyla Can Haklı ✗; 8. Ahmet Mortepe ✗; 9. Ayhan Özüsağlam ✗; 10. Mustafa Hazar ✗; 11. İsmail Kazan ✗; 12. Hakan Sabuncu ✗; 13. Sefa Ağızlıyüz ✗; 14. Resul İbiş ✗	2,144	0.18	N/A
DYP	None elected: 1. Ömer Bilgin ✗; 2. Mustafa Güler ✗; 3. Bekir Ragip Nejat Özkuyumcu ✗; 4. Ercüment Karaali ✗; 5. Sait Sağayak ✗; 6. Gülsüm Uludere ✗; 7. Adnan Menderes Uzun ✗; 8. Halil Sağayak ✗; 9. Ali Gülengül ✗; 10. Kader İnancurcı ✗; 11. Mustafa Bozdemir ✗; 12. Zeki Özer ✗; 13. Mansur Göktaş ✗; 14. Veli Erdem ✗	2,055	0.18	▲0.18
TKP	None elected: 1. Mehmet Kuzulugil ✗; 2. Uğur Pişmanlık ✗; 3. Tufan Ünlüeser ✗; 4. Gökhan Çimen ✗; 5. Songül Mergen ✗; 6. Gül Cingöz ✗; 7. Meryem Karacık ✗; 8. Gülçin Yılmaz Keser ✗; 9. Fırat Ateş ✗; 10. Feryat Turuşkan ✗; 11. Mehmet Can Ataş ✗; 12. Hatun Oçak ✗; 13. Sevgi Dalğıç ✗; 14. Meryem Kayhan ✗	1,322	0.11	▼0.08
Nationalist Conservative	None elected: 1. Taner Boz ✗; 2. Muhammet Murat Uğurlu ✗; 3. Ali Bahadır İnceler ✗; 4. Müslüm Alp ✗; 5. Sevinç Boz ✗; 6. Ayhan Özkaya ✗; 7. Dürdane Fedakar ✗; 8. Yusuf Tekin ✗; 9. Hakan Sozan ✗; 10. Beyhan Yardımcı ✗; 11. Mehmet Şerit ✗; 12. Saniye Aslıyüksek ✗; 13. Adem Arslan ✗; 14. Tuncay Civaoğlu ✗	856	0.07	▲0.07
Liberal Democrat	None elected: 1. Hüseyin Taciroğlu ✗; 2. Hamza Güngör ✗; 3. Davut Kosanoğlu ✗; 4. Özgür Karakök ✗; 5. Abdurrahman Boztaş ✗; 6. Candan Alpdoğan ✗; 7. Huriye Alemdar ✗; 8. Ömer Demir ✗; 9. Süveyla Lüle ✗; 10. Fatma Arzu Bacaksızlar ✗; 11. Meral Akkan ✗; 12. Mustafa Gökhan Turut ✗; 13. Gökben Tulba Seyhun ✗; 14. Arzu Seçilgin ✗	332	0.03	▲0.03
Labour	No candidates	0	0.00	0.00
Total votes		1,171,911	100.00	
Rejected ballots		24,090	2.01	▲0.13
Turnout		1,196,001	85.32	▲6.77

=== June 2015 ===
Abbr.	Party	Votes	%
AK Party	Justice and Development Party	368,055	29.9%
CHP	Republican People's Party	354,389	28.8%
MHP	Nationalist Movement Party	287,799	23.4%
HDP	Peoples' Democratic Party	177,730	14.5%
SP	Felicity Party	18,917	1.5%
	Other	22,927	1.9%
Total		1,229,817	
Turnout		84.91	
source: YSK

=== November 2015 ===
Abbr.	Party	Votes	%
AK Party	Justice and Development Party	462,362	36.8%
CHP	Republican People's Party	374,000	29.8%
MHP	Nationalist Movement Party	246,182	19.6%
HDP	Peoples' Democratic Party	147,572	11.8%
SP	Felicity Party	8,001	0.6%
	Other	17,612	1.4%
Total		1,255,729	
Turnout		85.71	
source: YSK

=== 2018 ===
Abbr.	Party	Votes	%
AK Party	Justice and Development Party	432,103	33.5%
CHP	Republican People's Party	337,497	26.2%
HDP	Peoples' Democratic Party	172,831	13.4%
IYI	Good Party	159,022	12.3%
MHP	Nationalist Movement Party	150,093	11.6%
SP	Felicity Party	13,738	1.1%
HÜDA-PAR	Free Cause Party	6,992	0.5%
	Other	16,991	1.3%
Total		1,289,267	
Turnout		86.14	
source: YSK

=== 2023 ===
Member	Political party
Ömer Çelik	Justice and Development Party (AK PARTİ)
Ahmet Zenbilci	Justice and Development Party (AK PARTİ)
Sunay Karamık	Justice and Development Party (AK PARTİ)
Abdullah Doğru	Justice and Development Party (AK PARTİ)
Faruk Aytek	Justice and Development Party (AK PARTİ)
Orhan Sümer	Republican People's Party
Müzeyyen Şevkin	Republican People's Party
Burhanettin Bulut	Republican People's Party
Sadullah Kısacık	Republican People's Party
Ayhan Barut	Republican People's Party
Muharrem Varlı	Nationalist Movement Party (MHP)
Ayşe Sibel Ersoy	Nationalist Movement Party (MHP)
Ayyüce Türkeş Taş	Good Party
Bilal Bilici	Good Party
Tulay Hatımoğulları Oruç	Party of Greens and the Left Future

== Presidential elections ==
=== 2014 ===
2014 presidential election: Adana
Party	Candidate	Votes	%
Independent	Ekmeleddin İhsanoğlu	541,567	50.43
AK Party	Recep Tayyip Erdoğan	417,892	38.91
HDP	Selahattin Demirtaş	114,530	10.66
Total votes		1,073,989	100.00
Rejected ballots		14,954	1.37
Turnout		1,088,943	75.02
Ekmeleddin İhsanoğlu win			
