= Labour Party (Turkey) =

Political party in Turkey

Labour Party Emek Partisi
- Abbreviation: EMEP
- Chairman: Seyit Aslan
- Founder: Abdullah Levent Tüzel
- Founded: 25 November 1996
- Preceded by: Revolutionary Communist Party of Turkey
- Headquarters: Fevzi Çakmak 1 Sokak No: 15/5, Ankara, Turkey
- Membership (2026): ▲4,900
- Ideology: Communism; Marxism–Leninism; Hoxhaism; Anti-revisionism
- Political position: Far-left
- National affiliation: HDK; Labour and Freedom Alliance (Since 2022)
- International affiliation: ICMLPO; IMCWP
- Colours: Red and Yellow
- Grand National Assembly: 2 / 600
- Municipal Assemblies: 11 / 20,952

Website
- www.emep.org

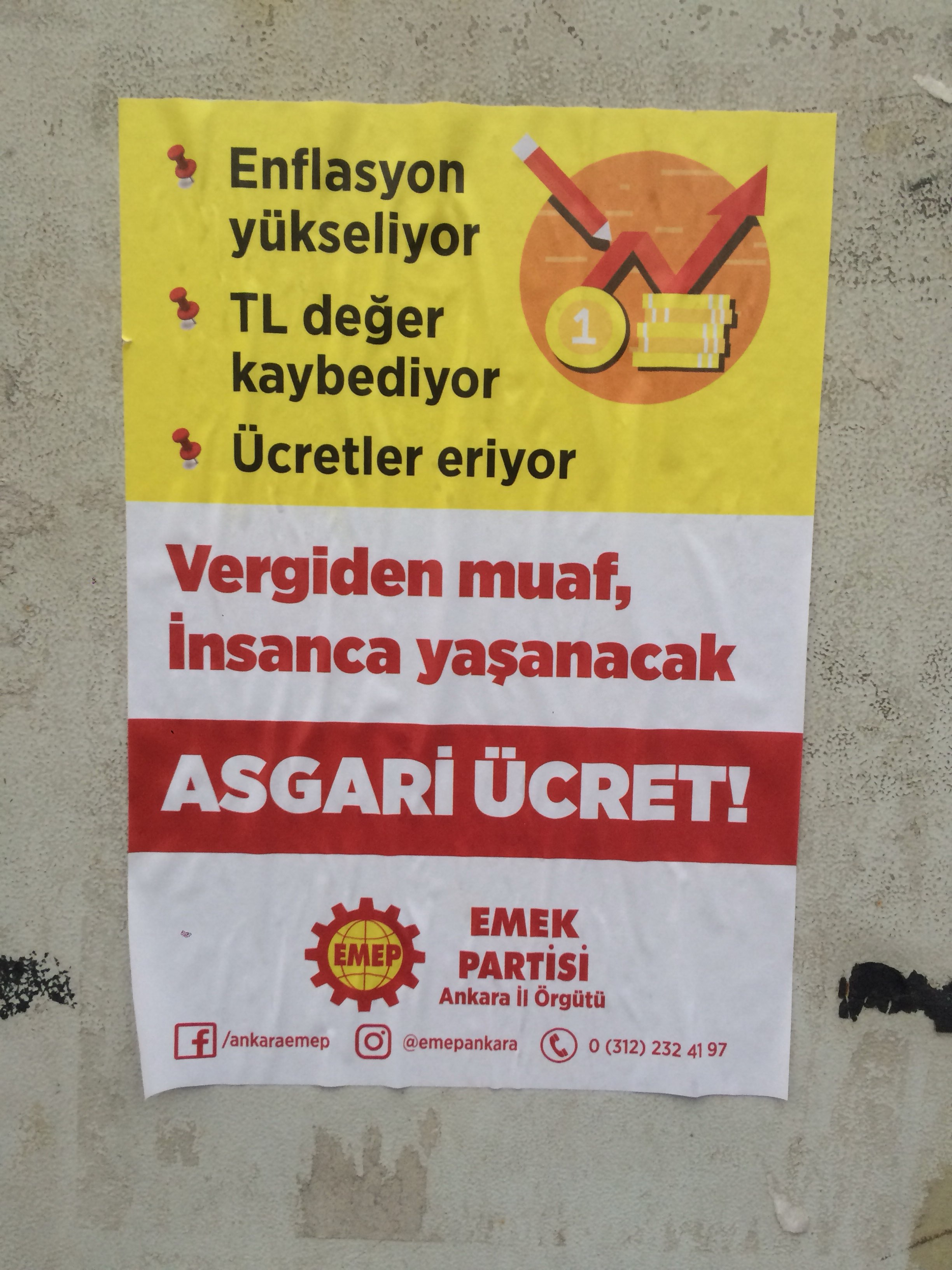
EMEP poster, 2021

The Labour Party (Turkish: Emek Partisi, pronounced [ɛˈmɛc paɾtiˈsi]; EMEP) is a Turkish political party founded in 1996. Its chairperson is Seyit Aslan.

Its ideological stance is in accord with the line of ICMLPO. In its programme, EMEP identifies its goal as creating an "Independent and Democratic Turkey". The party publishes the daily Evrensel (lit. 'Universal'). The party is one of the participants in the People's Democratic Congress, a political initiative instrumental in founding the Peoples' Democratic Party (HDP) in 2012. It is one of the few political parties in Turkey that recognizes the Armenian genocide.

== History ==
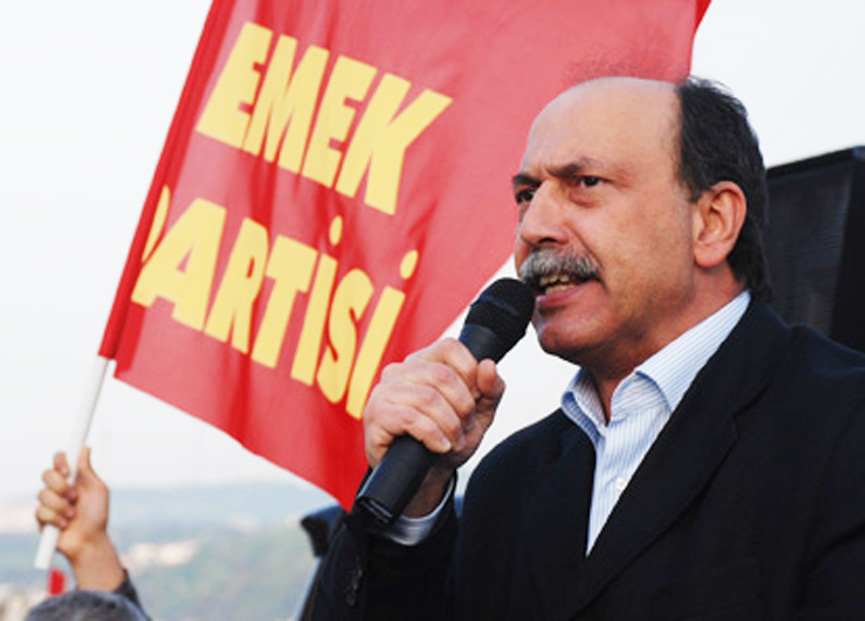
Labour Party founder Abdullah Levent Tüzel joined the HDP parliamentary caucus despite party's split with the HDP

The party was founded as Labour Party (Emek Partisi, EP) on 25 November 1996. Due to a ban by the Constitutional Court, it was refounded as Party of Labour (Emeğin Partisi, EMEP) the same year. In 2005, the original name was reinstalled after the European Court of Human Rights held the ban was a violation of the European Convention on Human Rights.

=== Split in the Peoples' Democratic Party (HDP) ===
The Labour Party (EMEP) had been a member of the Peoples' Democratic Congress and had participated in the establishment of the HDP in 2012. However, the EMEP released a statement on 17 June 2014, announcing a split with the HDP. The split was attributed to the restructuring of the Kurdish nationalist Peace and Democracy Party into a local-only party under the new name Democratic Regions Party (DBP), while the BDP's parliamentary caucus would be integrated into the HDP. This would, in turn, require the HDP's constitution to be altered in order to ensure greater compliance and conformity with the ideology of the BDP. This caused the EMEP to formally announce their secession from the HDP, but stated that they would continue their participation with the HDK. Despite the split, the Labour Party endorsed the HDP presidential candidate Selahattin Demirtaş for the 2014 presidential election and also announced that they would not be running in the June 2015 general election.

== Elections ==
The party participated in the 1999 General Elections, getting 51,756 votes, i.e. 0.17% of the total vote. In 2007, EMEP became a constituent party in the Thousand Hopes Alliance formed around DEHAP. The aim of the alliance was to present its candidates to the Turkish Parliament as independents in order to circumvent the electoral threshold of 10% which had been introduced in the Turkish Constitution in 1982. At the 2007 General Elections, the party gathered 26,574 votes, or 0.08% of the popular vote.

=== 2023 elections ===
The party took part in the Labour and Freedom Alliance established on 25 August 2022 under the leadership of HDP for the 2023 Turkish general election. The party leadership of HDP has announced that it will hand over active political work to the Green Left Party (YSP) due to the closure case against it. On March 24, 2023, the alliance members HDP, the Labourist Movement Party (EHP) and the Social Freedom Party (TÖP) decided to enter the 2023 elections from the lists of the YSP. Later, on April 6, 2023, EMEP also decided to enter the elections from the lists of the YSP. Sevda Karaca was elected MP for Gaziantep from 1st place and İskender Bayhan was elected MP for Istanbul 3rd District.

Selma Gürkan was elected the chairperson of the EMEP in 2011. On 22 November 2020, Ercüment Akdeniz was elected the party's chairperson. Following Akdeniz's resignation, which he announced on social media, due to issues between him and the party's top management during the 2023 Turkish general elections, Selma Gürkan replaced him.

== Media organs ==
The Evrensel newspaper was founded on 7 June 1995. The magazines Evrensel Kültür (lit. 'Universal Culture'), Özgürlük Dünyası (lit. 'World of Freedom') and Tîroj, published by the party-affiliated publishing house Evrensel Basım Yayın, were shut down in 2016 by Decree Law No. 675 (KHK) under the state of emergency. The publishing house was shut down by KHK in January 2017.

== See also ==
- List of anti-revisionist groups
