= Labour and Freedom Alliance =

Turkish electoral alliance

Labour and Freedom Alliance Emek ve Özgürlük İttifakı
- Founded: 25 August 2022
- Membership (2026): ▼78,714
- Ideology: Left-wing populism; Anti-capitalism; Minority rights; Factions: Communism; Social democracy; Regionalism
- Political position: Left-wing
- Members: Peoples' Equality and Democracy Party; Democratic Regions Party; Workers' Party of Turkey; Labour Party; Labourist Movement Party; Social Freedom Party; Federation of Socialist Assemblies
- Colors: Red and purple
- Slogan: Together we will succeed! (Turkish: Hep birlikte başaracağız!)
- Grand National Assembly: 63 / 600
- Metropolitan municipalities: 3 / 30
- Provinces: 7 / 51
- District municipalities: 66 / 973
- Belde Municipalities: 10 / 390
- Politics of Turkey; Political parties; Elections; A: A broad left-wing alliance, it includes some far-left factions.

The Labour and Freedom Alliance (Note: The alliance is also colloquially known as the Third Alliance (Üçüncü İttifak in Turkish) by the Turkish media and society, as this alliance constitutes the third largest composition of parties, and was announced after the People's and Nation Alliance.) (Turkish: Emek ve Özgürlük İttifakı, Kurdish: Hevkariya Ked û Azadiyê) is a left-wing electoral alliance in Turkey, formed by Peoples' Equality and Democracy Party (DEM Parti), Peoples' Democratic Party (HDP), Workers' Party of Turkey (TİP), Labour Party (EMEP), Labourist Movement Party (EHP), Social Freedom Party (TÖP) and Federation of Socialist Assemblies (SMF). The alliance declared its foundation on 25 August 2022. In their declaration, the member parties jointly proclaimed that the alliance aims "equality, freedom, fraternity, peace and democracy for the Turkish society."

== Foundation ==
The initial process of alliance negotiations started with meetings of individual parties. In early 2022, HDP openly called for left-wing parties to build a political alliance and invited TİP, EMEP, EHP, TÖP, SMF, SOL Parti and TKP for a preliminary gathering and discussion. SOL Parti immediately announced that they would not participate in discussions, citing disagreements on timing and strategy, while TKP declared their withdrawal after the first meeting. (Note: SOL Parti and TKP announced another electoral alliance with different left-wing parties called Union of Socialist Forces.) Although part of the meetings throughout, Halkevleri decided to not take part in the final formation of the alliance due to their reluctance to focus on upcoming elections, although adding that they would support the goals of the alliance.

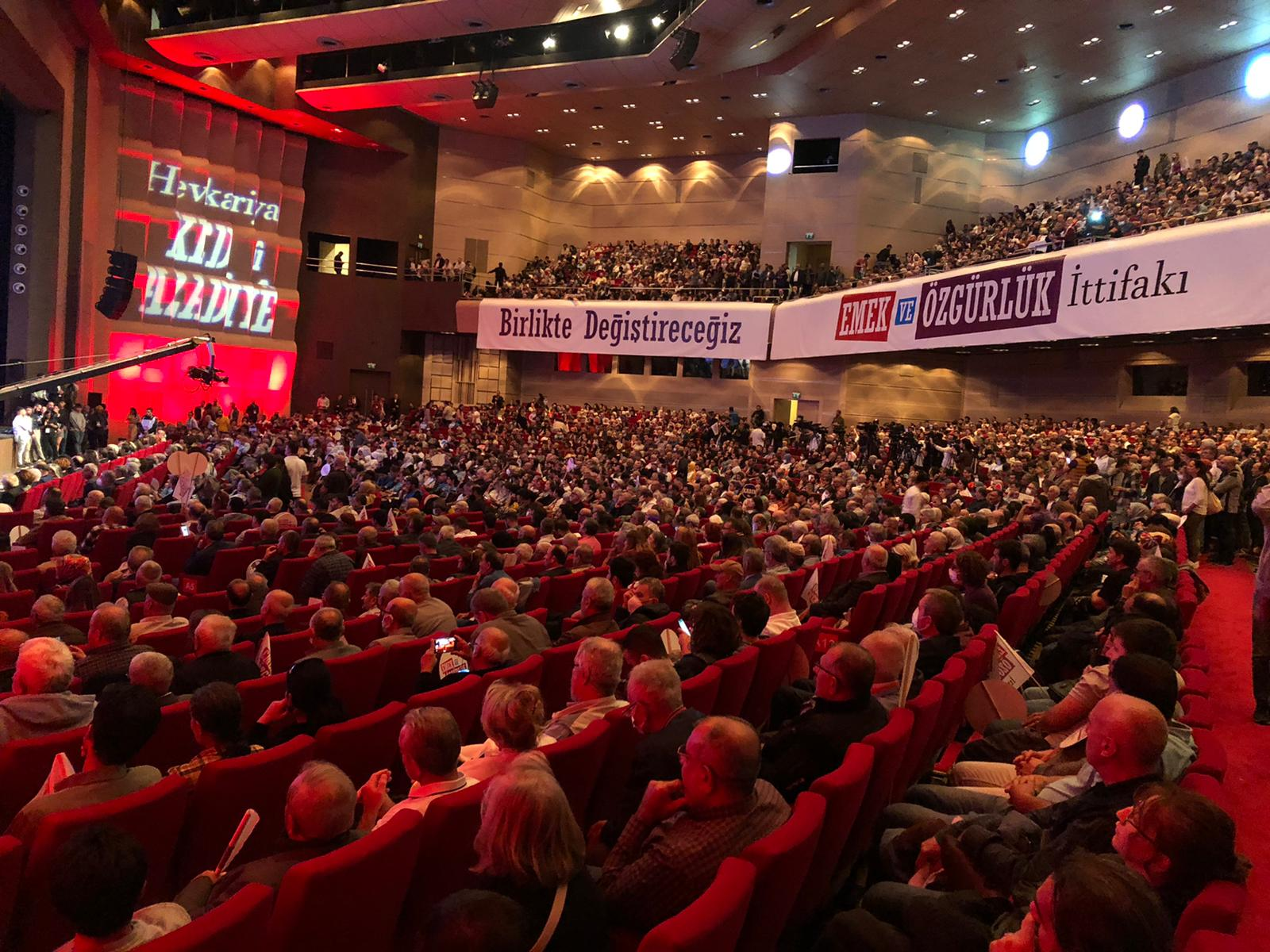
Labour and Freedom Alliance announcing its political goals on 24 September 2022

The parties declared that the political program and the roadmap of the alliance will be announced in Haliç Congress Center, İstanbul on 24 September 2022. Eighty literary figures from Turkey, including names like Murathan Mungan, Zülfü Livaneli, İnci Aral and Ahmet Ümit, signed a public declaration to support the alliance's foundation and its political goals. On 22 March 2023, the parties declared that they would not field a presidential candidate for the 2023 Turkish presidential election, boosting the chances of the Republican People's Party and Nation Alliance candidate Kemal Kılıçdaroğlu. The alliance later endorsed Kılıçdaroğlu on 27 April 2023 in opposition to incumbent President Erdoğan's campaign.

== Ideology ==
The member parties declared they would announce the alliance's guiding principles and political programme in September 2022. The leader of EMEP, Ercüment Akdeniz pointed out that the strengthening of secularism, the democratization of the country, equal citizenship rights and putting an end to the economic, societal and environmental exploitation are the main political focuses while adding that the alliance should aim to expand beyond its current members. Erkan Baş, leader of TİP, maintained that the alliance should constitute a credible alternative for "millions of people who are not (properly) represented by Nation or People's Alliance" and successfully encompass "workers, young people, farmers, women, LGBTI community, Kurds and Alevis".

Per the political declaration of the alliance, the parties offer an egalitarian, environmentalist, democratic and feminist vision for Turkey, while denouncing the pro-business, crony capitalist, neo-liberal and authoritarian practices of Recep Tayyip Erdoğan and Justice and Development Party (AKP) governments.

== Composition ==
Party	Abbr.	Leader	Ideology	Position	Seats in parliament
Peoples' Equality and Democracy Party; Halkların Eşitlik ve Demokrasi Partisi	DEM Party	Tülay Hatimoğulları; Tuncer Bakırhan	Regionalism; Green politics Direct democracy Left-libertarianism; Left-wing populism	Centre-left to left-wing	56 / 600
Workers' Party of Turkey; Türkiye İşçi Partisi	TİP	Erkan Baş	Communism; Marxism–Leninism; Left-wing populism	Left-wing to far-left	3 / 600
Democratic Regions Party; Demokratik Bölgeler Partisi	DBP	Çiğdem Kılıçgün Uçar; Keskin Bayındır	Kurdish nationalism Social democracy Democratic socialism Regionalism	Left-wing	2 / 600
Labour Party; Emek Partisi	EMEP	Seyit Aslan	Communism; Marxism–Leninism; Hoxhaism; Anti-revisionism	Far-left	2 / 600
Labourist Movement Party; Emekçi Hareket Partisi	EHP	Hakan Öztürk	Communism; Marxism–Leninism	Far-left	0 / 600
Social Freedom Party; Toplumsal Özgürlük Partisi	TÖP	Şilan Sürmeli	Libertarian socialism Eco-socialism; Socialist feminism LGBTQ rights Minority rights	Left-wing to far-left	0 / 600
Federation of Socialist Assemblies; Sosyalist Meclisler Federasyonu	SMF	Collective leadership	Communism; Maoism	Far-left	N/A

== See also ==
- Union of Socialist Forces
- United June Movement
- Labour, Democracy and Freedom Bloc
- Thousand Hope Candidates
- Peoples' Democratic Congress
