= Greens Party (Turkey) =

Green Party Yeşiller Partisi
- Abbreviation: YEŞİLLER
- Leader: Özlem Teke Taşdemir (female spokesperson); Koray Doğan Urbarlı (male spokesperson)
- Founded: 21 September 2020; 30 June 2002 (First incarnation)
- Dissolved: 25 November 2012 (First incarnation)
- Split from: Green Left Party
- Headquarters: Ankara
- Ideology: Green politics Ecofeminism; LGBT rights
- Political position: Centre-left
- Colours: Green
- Slogan: «Our house is burning! We will put this fire out!» (Turkish: «Evimiz yanıyor! Bu yangını söndüreceğiz!»)

Website
- yesiller.org.tr

The Greens Party (Turkish: Yeşiller Partisi also Yeşiller for short) or Green Party is a green party in Turkey founded in 2020. The Interior Ministry blocked the party from standing in the 2023 elections.

== History ==
Greens Party (Turkish: Yeşiller Partisi) (website yesiller.org) was a green liberal party in Turkey. Being the 57th political party of Turkey, it was established on 30 June 2008 after years of preparation since 2002.

A green party with the same name was established prior to its establishment in 1988 (its founding President was former Health Minister Celal Ertuğ (in Turkish)). The latter was closed down in 1994, and its third and last President was Aydın Ayas, who took the eco-liberal turn for the party.

Greens maintained local branches and initiatives in Istanbul, Ankara, İzmir, Bursa, Tekirdağ, and Antalya. Greens were known as the Greens of Turkey (Turkish: Türkiye'nin Yeşilleri, Yeşiller Partisi) prior to the founding of the party. The party held its first general congress on 6 June 2010.

In November 2012, it merged with the Equality and Democracy Party to form the Greens and the Left Party of the Future, YSGP for short. The party is one of the participants in the Peoples' Democratic Congress, a political initiative instrumental in founding the Peoples' Democratic Party in 2012. The Greens, along with feminists, left YSGP en masse in 2016, citing its lack of democratic decision making practices.

After the splitting, Yeşil Siyaset Meclisi was founded with the idea of founding a green party again one day. After four years of preparation, Yeşiller Partisi was founded on 21 September 2020 again with 110 founding members; 55 of these members were women and 55 were men.

In 2020, the Greens submitted documents to the Ministry of the Interior to register their status as a political party, so their name could be written on ballot papers. In 2021 the Greens filed a lawsuit against the ministry over the delay in providing the receipt stipulated in the Political Parties Law. In February 2023, the Ankara 8th Administrative Court ruled that the Interior Ministry must issue the receipt.

The party endorsed Kemal Kılıçdaroğlu for the 2023 Turkish presidential election. For the parliamentary elections, on the other hand, the party established an electoral alliance with the Workers' Party of Turkey (TİP), and its spokerpersons, Özlem Taşdemir Teke and Koray Doğan Urbarlı, decided to run as candidates on TİP's lists.

== Party programme ==
- Carbon-free economy: Greens say that fossil fuel dependency is the main cause of the climate change that has shaken political and social structures, and economic dynamics around the world; and of climate change in Turkey. They aim to stop all fossil fuel use by 2050 and reduce the nation's greenhouse gas emissions to net zero. In order to achieve this Greens encourage responsible use of the nation's solar energy and wind power and phasing out the use of coal in Turkey.
- Green New Deal: Greens aim for a total transformation of the economy of Turkey by supporting the nation's energy and transport infrastructure change, energy efficiency, creating good jobs, increasing the quality of life, cooperatives, sustainable tourism in Turkey, small scale agriculture in Turkey, care services, alternative and informal jobs.
- Water as a right for all: Greens say that water is a commons that belongs to all humans, other living beings and future generations. Greens will develop policies that will repair the broken hydrological cycle and foster water conservation in agricultural, domestic and industrial domains.
- Good, Clean, Healthy Food for All: Greens will ban pesticides which put the country's biodiversity, natural resources, human and animal lives at risk. They aim to create a support system to prevent the farmers dependency on companies and pesticides, and focus on preventing the depletion of natural resources, soil degradation, deforestation and desertification through holistic, restorative and sustainable agricultural practices.
- Gender and Sexuality: Greens say that gender and sexuality in the country is an area of rights, equality and freedom and set out to displace the patriarchal ideology and make structural and relational change in order to achieve liberation for all individuals, women, men and LGBTQI+ through equal citizenship.

== See also ==
- Air pollution in Turkey
- Radical Democratic Union
