= Cengiz Çiçek =

Turkish politician

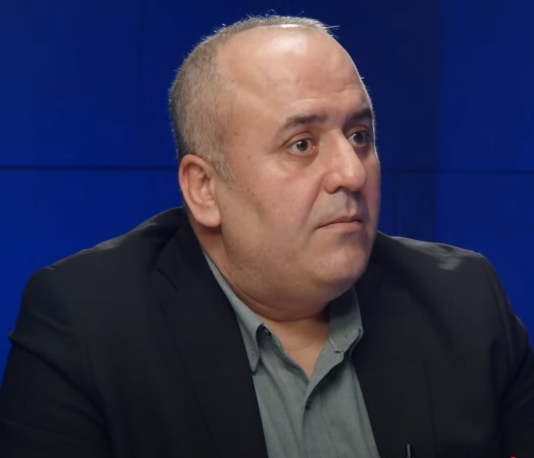
Image of Cengiz Çiçek

Cengiz Çiçek (born 1978 Tunceli, Turkey) is a lawyer and politician of the Peoples' Equality and Democracy Party (DEM Party). Since June 2023, he is a member of the Grand National Assembly of Turkey.

== Early life and education ==
Cengiz Çiçek was born in Tunceli in 1978 into an Alevi-Kurdish family. In 1985 the family moved to Izmir where he attended school. Later he studied law at the Marmara University in Istanbul.

== Professional career ==
In 2009, at the time when Abdullah Öcalan's detention conditions were alleviated, he was his attorney. In 2011 he was arrested together with 45 other lawyers, who represented Öcalan. In March 2014 he was released with nine other lawyers who were investigated of representing Öcalan and activities concerning the Kurdistan Communities Union (KCK).

== Political career ==
Cengiz Çiçek began his political career with the People's Democracy Party (HADEP) and was also the co-speaker of the Peoples' Democratic Congress (HDK). In 2018, when he was the co-chair of Istanbul branch of the HDP, he was arrested for six days over terror related charges. In the parliamentary elections of May 2023, he was elected to the Grand National Assembly of Turkey representing Istanbul for the (YSP).

=== Political positions ===
Çiçek is against the closure of the Peoples' Democratic Party (HDP), calling it a judicial sabotage that the HDP had to take part in the elections under the umbrella of the YSP, and supports the Saturday Mothers, a Turkish human rights organization.
