= Sevda Karaca Demir =

Turkish journalist and politician

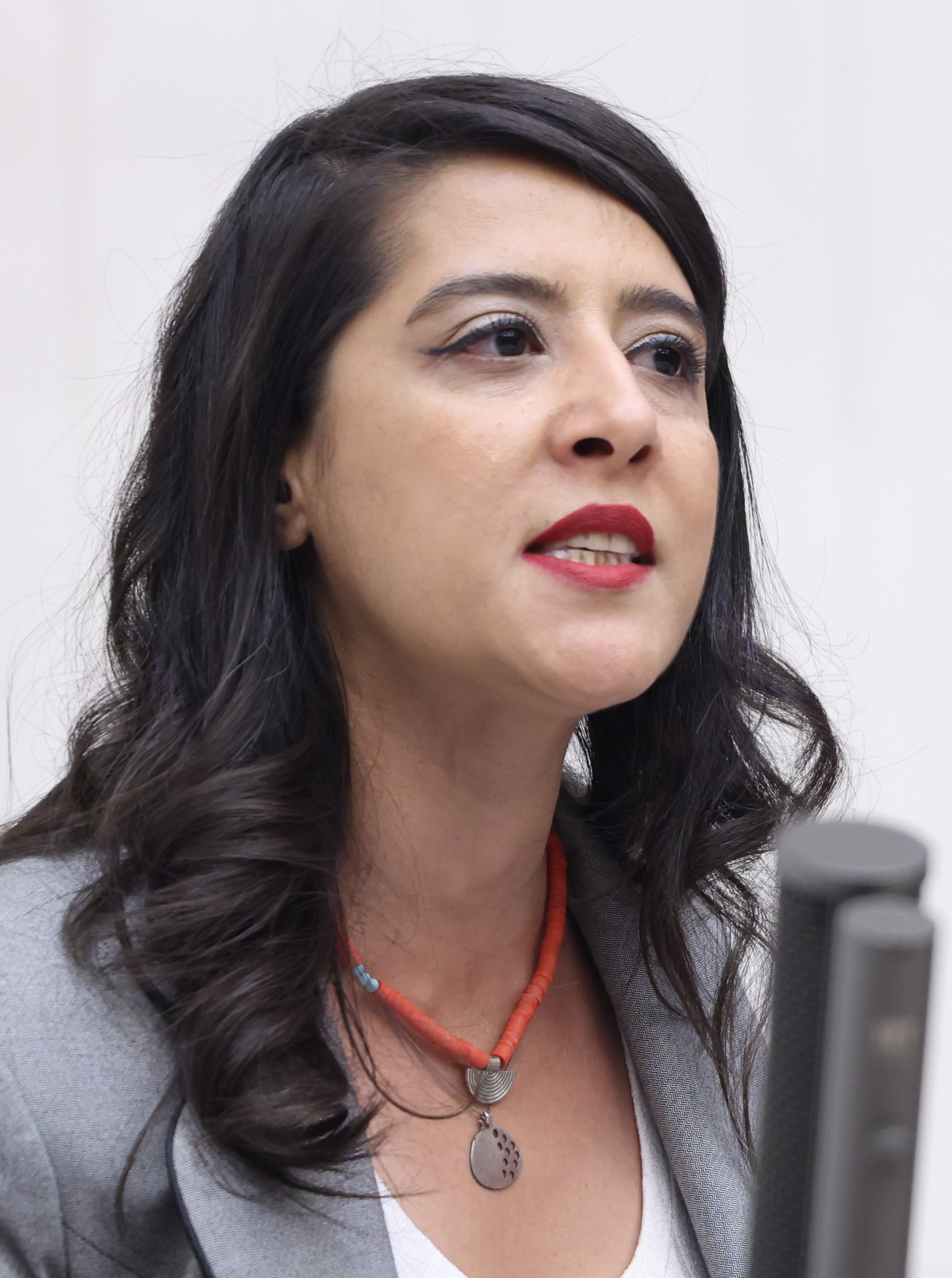

Member of the Grand National Assembly of Turkey
- Incumbent
- Assumed office 2 June 2023

Personal details
- Born: 1984 (age 41–42) Adana, Turkey
- Party: EMEP
- Other political affiliations: DEM Party
- Education: Middle Eastern Technical University
- Profession: Journalist

Sevda Karaca Demir (born , 1984, Adana, Turkey) is a journalist and politician of the Hoxhaist Labour Party (EMEP). Since June 2023 she is a member of the Grand National Assembly of Turkey representing Gaziantep. Before she was a journalist for the newspaper Evrensel.

== Early life and education ==
Sevda Karaca was born in 1984 in Adana, as the daughter of a textile workers family. She studied political sciences at the Middle Eastern Technical University (ODTÜ) and was tempted by journalism.

== Professional career ==
In 2007, Sevda Karaca began as a journalist for Evrensel and was also involved in founding Hayat TV. For Hayat TV, Karaca was a reporter from Ankara. She also became the presenter of the show Ekmek ve Gül that focuses on the women's workers rights. In 2010 she established a women's supplement to the Evrensel also called Ekmek ve Gül. In 2016, Hayat TV was shut down in the aftermath of the attempted coup d'état in 2016. In 2018 she received the Metin Göktepe journalism award. in 2021, she was a member of the jury for the Metin Göktepe award.

== Political career ==
In the parliamentary elections of May 2023, she was elected into the Grand National Assembly of Turkey representing the Green Left Party (YSP) for Gaziantep.

=== Political positions ===
As a politician from Gaziantep, she defends workers rights. In July 2023 she raised awareness about the situations of two workers from a factory owned by İrfan Çeliksan, an MP for the Justice and Development Party (AKP). The workers were allegedly forced to work despite being diagnosed with COVID-19 and subsequently died. The court suspended the investigation into their deaths due to the parliamentary immunity that protects Çeliksan.

Sevda Karaca believes the elections in 2023 were not fair as the Governing alliance used state resources in their electoral campaign. After the parliamentary elections she demanded a repetition of the elections in the Gaziantep province as around 2000 potential voters for the EMEP were inscribed as polling officials by the Patriotic Party without having informed them.
