= Uslupehlivan =

Uslupehlivan is a surname. Notable people with the surname include:

- Aydın Uslupehlivan (born 1954), Turkish politician
- Polen Uslupehlivan (born 1990), Turkish volleyball player
