= Tavuklu, Ömerli =

Village in Mardin Province, Turkey

Tavuklu
- Neighbourhood
- Location in Turkey
- Coordinates: 37.380°N 40.930°E
- Country: Turkey
- Province: Mardin
- District: Ömerli
- Population (2021): 31
- Time zone: UTC+3 (TRT)

Tavuklu (Kurdish: Xirbê Mirîşkê) is a neighbourhood in the municipality and district of Ömerli, Mardin Province in Turkey. The village is populated by Kurds of the Omerkan tribe and had a population of 31 in 2021.

== Notable people ==
- Deniz Poyraz
