= Ayşe Sibel Ersoy =

Turkish politician (born 1964)

Ayşe Sibel Ersoy MP
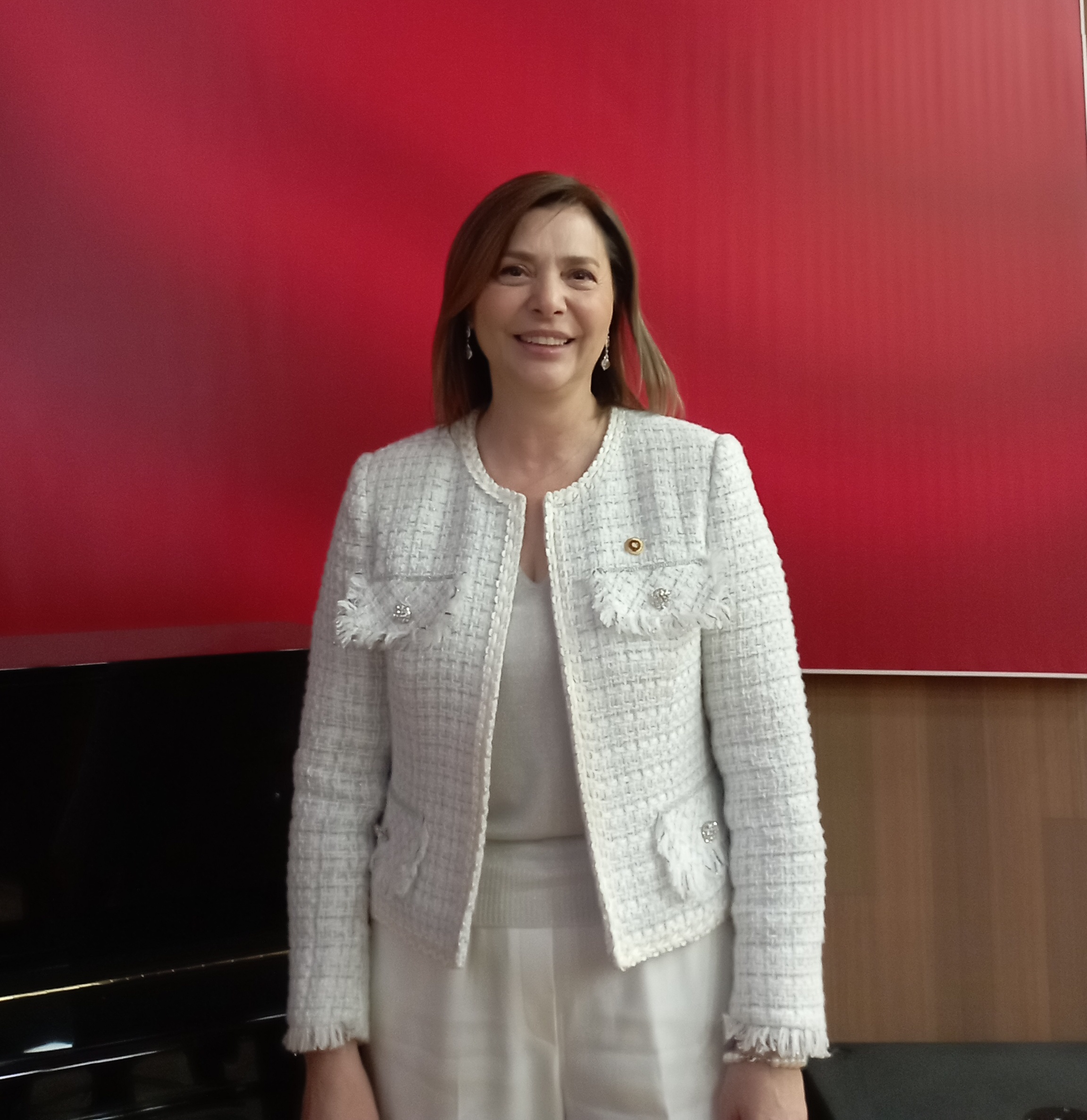

Member of the Grand National Assembly
- Incumbent
- Assumed office 7 July 2018
- Constituency: Adana (2018, 2023)

Personal details
- Born: 1964 (age 61–62) Adana, Turkey
- Party: Nationalist Movement Party
- Children: 2
- Education: Ege University; Gazi University
- Occupation: Pharmacist

Ayşe Sibel Ersoy (born 1964) is a Turkish politician, pharmacist and member of parliament from the Nationalist Movement Party (MHP) in Adana.

== Life ==
She is a graduate of the Ege University Pharmacy faculty. She completed her master's degree at Gazi University in the branch of Pharmacology. In the 2018 general election, she was elected into the Grand National Assembly representing Adana for the MHP where she became a member of the environment commission. She was re-elected in 2023 general election. Ersoy is married and has two children.
