= Peoples' Equality and Democracy Party =

Minority rights political party in Turkey

Peoples' Equality and Democracy Party Halkların Eşitlik ve Demokrasi Partisi
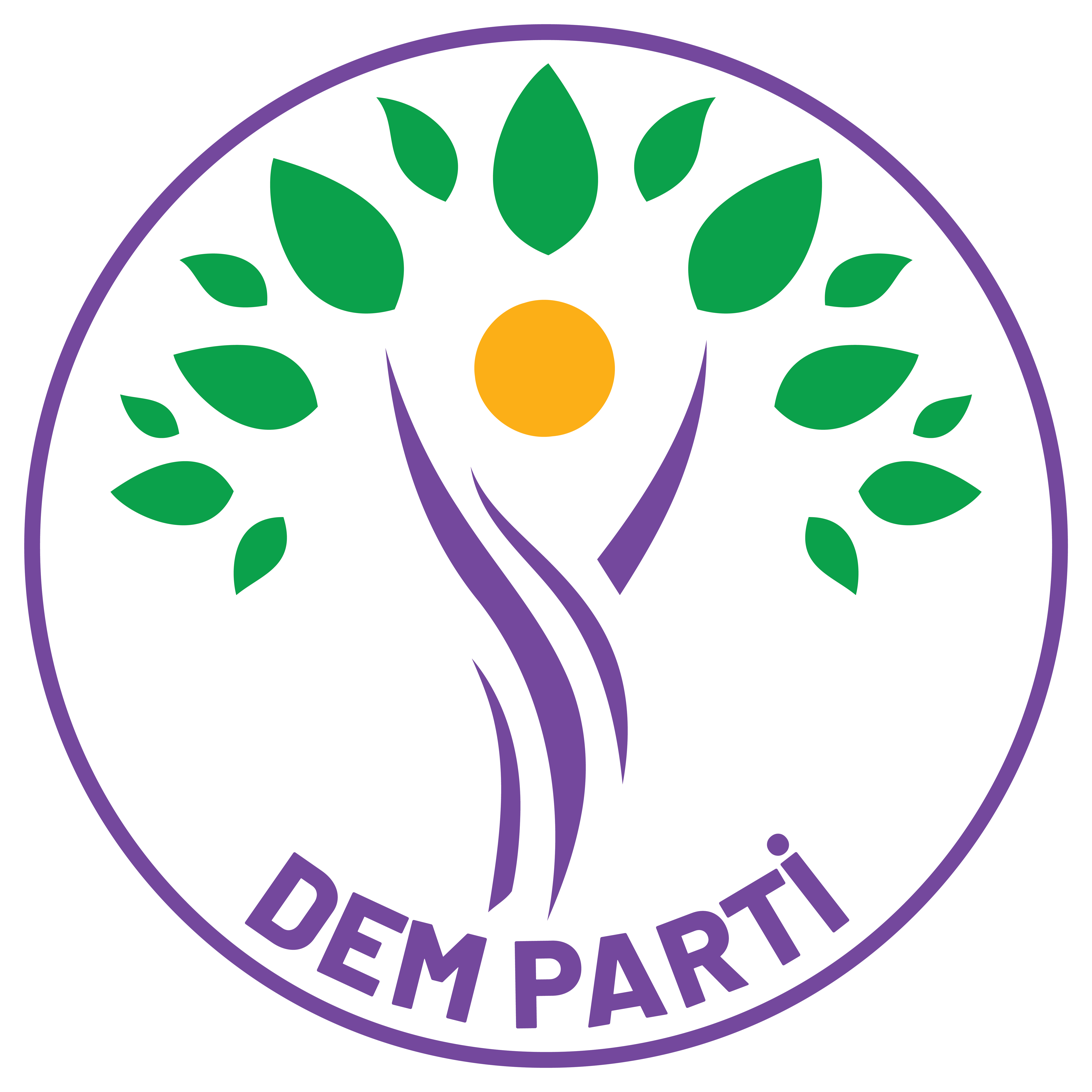
- Abbreviation: DEM Party (official in English)
- Co-Leaders: Tülay Hatimoğulları; Tuncer Bakırhan
- Founded: 15 October 2023; 3 years ago
- Preceded by: Green Left Party (de jure); Peoples' Democratic Party (de facto)
- Headquarters: Atatürk Bulvarı No:88 Daire: 16 Çankaya – Ankara
- Membership (2026): ▲17,060
- Ideology: Minority rights; Kurdish interests; Kurdish nationalism; Regionalism; Turkeyification; Secularism
- Political position: Centre-left to left-wing
- National affiliation: Peoples' Democratic Congress; Labour and Freedom Alliance; Kurdish Freedom and Democracy Alliance
- European affiliation: Party of European Socialists (associate member)
- International affiliation: Progressive Alliance; Socialist International (consultative member)
- Colours: Green, Purple and Orange
- Grand National Assembly: 56 / 600
- Metropolitan municipalities: 1 / 30
- Provinces: 3 / 51
- District municipalities: 49 / 922
- Belde Municipalities: 9 / 390
- Provincial councilors: 132 / 1,282
- Municipal Assemblies: 1,410 / 20,953

Website
- demparti.org.tr

The Peoples' Equality and Democracy Party (Kurmanji Kurdish: Partiya Wekhevî û Demokrasiya Gelan; Turkish: Halkların Eşitlik ve Demokrasi Partisi, abbreviated as DEM Party) is a pro-Kurdish political party in Turkey. It is the legal successor of the Green Left Party and with the Peoples' Democratic Party (HDP) handing over its work to this party in 2023, it became the latest iteration of the Kurdish minority interests party in Turkey. Similar to its predecessors, its adversaries accuse the party of being the political branch of the Kurdistan Workers' Party (PKK), which is designated as a terrorist organization by Turkey.

== History ==
Logo of Green Left Party 2022–2023

The Peoples' Democratic Party (HDP) has faced a closure case since 2021. Selahattin Demirtaş stated that if the party is closed, HDP parliamentary candidates would enter the Green Left Party (YSP) lists in the 2023 general election. Furthermore, the party leadership of HDP announced that it would hand over active political work to the YSP. Already in October 2022, YSP changed their logo to design closer to HDP.

Upon the decision taken on 24 March 2023, Peoples' Democratic Party, Labour Party, Labourist Movement Party and Social Freedom Party decided to enter the 2023 general election from the Green Left Party lists. The party received 8.82% of the votes and currently has 57 MPs in the parliament, while HDP had won 11.7% of the votes in the 2018 elections. The YSP did not nominate any presidential candidate for the 2023 election but instead supported Republican People's Party (CHP) leader Kemal Kılıçdaroğlu, who was the joint presidential candidate of an opposition bloc named the Nation Alliance and was defeated by the incumbent president, Recep Tayyip Erdoğan in the run-off round.

The Green Left Party's 4th Extraordinary Congress was held on 15 October 2023 in Ankara Atatürk Sports Hall with the slogan "Again for Freedom", where the YSP changed its name and elected new co-chairs. The new name of the party was determined as Peoples' Equality and Democracy Party (HEDEP). Adana MP Tülay Hatimoğulları Oruç and Siirt MP Tuncer Bakırhan were elected as co-chairs. A month earlier it was reported that YSP planned to rename itself to "Democratic People's Party" (Turkish: Demokratik Halklar Partisi). The abbreviation "HEDEP" was rejected for the resemblance to HADEP.

== Political positions ==
The party charter states that the DEM Party "assumes political responsibility for a new life and future, for the establishment of a democratic, libertarian, egalitarian, just, ecological, gender-equal and solidaristic society, with a pluralist, participatory and deliberative understanding of struggle; defending universal human rights without any discrimination, protecting the rights of nature and all living things, fighting against militarism" and that it is an ecologist, peaceful democratic political party in favor of labor and social justice. It proclaims that "our Party, where the forces that struggle together for these goals come together to eliminate all forms of oppression, exploitation and discrimination and to build a life worthy of human dignity, aims for a democratic people's rule."

Following the 2023 elections, the party held a two-day conference in Ankara under the slogan "With Change to Freedom". At the conference, Çiğdem Kılıçgün Uçar, co-spokesperson of the Green Left Party, defined the Kurdish question as the most important problem in Turkey, and a matter of denial and annihilation. Uçar has also stated that Abdullah Öcalan is "the most important actor for Turkey's democratization", claiming his "absolute isolation" in İmralı that has lasted for 24 years to be the biggest obstacle to democratization. The party supports a peaceful solution to the Kurdish question through democratic confederalism, endorsing the Rojava model.

Instead of the French laique model of secularism with the complete exclusion of religion from politics and social life, the party promotes "liberal secularism" through activities such as the "Democratic Islam Desk", which is part of the party's Peoples and Beliefs Commission. On 26 March 2023, the party issued a resolute declaration following its party assembly meeting, emphasizing its commitment to challenging the current one-man regime in Turkey and advocating for a democratic republic. The declaration advocates for the revolutionaries, Alevis, Kurds, women, and youth to push for change and express their demands for their rights, education and housing.

== Election results ==
=== Parliamentary elections ===
Grand National Assembly of Turkey
Election date	Leader	Votes	% of Votes	Seats	+/-	Position
2023	Çiğdem Kılıçgün Uçar; İbrahim Akın	4,803,774	8.82%	57 / 600	▲57	Opposition

=== Local elections ===
Election date	Leader	Councillors			Municipalities			
Election date	Leader	Popular Vote	%	±	Popular Vote	%	#	±
2024	Tülay Hatimoğulları; Tuncer Bakırhan	2.646.124	5,80 (#5)	▼0,04 (as HDP)	2.625.588	5,70 (#4)	85 / 1,389	▲60
