= Mevlüt Karakaya =

Turkish politician (born 1963)

Mevlüt Karakaya MP
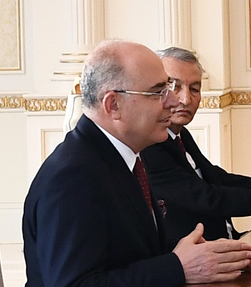

Deputy leader of the Nationalist Movement Party
- Incumbent
- Assumed office 19 June 2011
- Leader: Devlet Bahçeli

Member of the Grand National Assembly
- Incumbent
- Assumed office 7 June 2015
- Constituency: Adana (June 2015, Nov 2015); Ankara (I) (2018, 2023)

Personal details
- Born: January 1, 1963 (age 63) Adana, Turkey
- Party: Nationalist Movement Party (MHP)
- Education: Gazi University
- Occupation: Politician
- Profession: Economist

Mevlüt Karakaya (born 1 January 1963) is a Turkish politician from the Nationalist Movement Party (MHP), who has served as a Member of Parliament for Adana since 7 June 2015.

Born in Adana, Karakaya graduated from Gazi University Faculty of Economics and Administrative Sciences. He became a professor at the age of 37, having continued as an academic in the United States at Indiana University, Michigan State University and Purdue University. He also briefly worked at the World Bank between 1997 and 1998. He has taught at Gazi University, Hacettepe University, İzmir University of Economics as well as Başkent University.

Having been active as a MHP member and serving as a member of the Party Executive Board for 10 years, he was appointed Deputy Leader of the MHP on 19 June 2011 with responsibilities for party finance. He was elected as a MHP Member of Parliament at the June 2015 general election.

== See also ==
- 25th Parliament of Turkey
