= Muharrem Varlı =

Turkish politician (born 1969)

Muharrem Varlı MP

Member of the Grand National Assembly
- Incumbent
- Assumed office 23 July 2007
- Constituency: Adana (2007, 2011, June 2015, Nov 2015, 2018, 2023)

Personal details
- Born: 22 April 1969 (age 57) Adana, Turkey
- Party: Nationalist Movement Party (MHP)
- Education: Selçuk University
- Occupation: Politician

Muharrem Varlı (born 22 April 1969) is a Turkish politician from the Nationalist Movement Party (MHP), who has served as a Member of Parliament for Adana since 22 July 2007.

Born in Adana, Varlı graduated from Selçuk University Faculty of Arts and Sciences history department. He was self-employed, having worked as a farmer before being elected as a MHP Member of Parliament at the June 2015 general election. He is married and has two children and speaks English at a semi-fluent level.

== See also ==
- 25th Parliament of Turkey
