= Sadullah Kısacık =

Turkish politician (born 1977)

Sadullah Kısacık MP

Member of the Grand National Assembly
- Incumbent
- Assumed office 2 June 2023
- Constituency: Adana (2023)
- In office 23 June 2015 – 1 October 2015
- Constituency: Adana (June 2015)

Personal details
- Born: 1 January 1977 (age 49) Adana, Turkey
- Party: Justice and Development Party (AKP) (2002–2019); Democracy and Progress Party (DEVA) (2020–present); New Path (from 2025)
- Education: Çukurova University
- Profession: Industrial engineer

Sadullah Kısacık (born 1 January 1977) is a Turkish politician from the Justice and Development Party (AKP), who served as a Member of Parliament for Adana from 23 June 2015, up until 1 October 2015. He was elected to parliament again in the 2023 Turkish parliamentary election.

Born in Adana, Kısacık graduated from Çukurova University as an industrial engineer, working as an advisor regarding quality control and engineering to over 500 companies. He first joined the AKP in 2002 as a member of its youth wing, having worked for and participated in the party's election campaigns in Adana before becoming an AKP Member of Parliament in June 2015.

== See also ==
- 25th Parliament of Turkey
