= Necdet Ünüvar =

Turkish politician (born 1960)

Member of the Grand National Assembly
- In office 22 July 2007 – 7 July 2018
- Constituency: Adana (2007, 2011, June 2015, Nov 2015)

Undersecretary to the Health Ministry
- In office 12 December 2002 – 8 May 2007
- Minister: Recep Akdağ

Personal details
- Born: 6 June 1960 (age 66) Ceyhan, Adana, Turkey
- Party: Justice and Development Party (AKP)
- Education: Atatürk University
- Occupation: Politician
- Profession: Medical doctor
- Website: www.necdetunuvar.com.tr

Necdet Ünüvar (born 6 June 1960) is a Turkish politician from the Justice and Development Party (AKP), who served as a Member of Parliament for Adana from 2007 to 2018. He is currently the rector of Ankara University.

== Biography ==
Born in the district of Ceyhan, Adana, he graduated from Atatürk University Faculty of Medicine, becoming a docent and later a professor after taking on various roles in different hospitals. Specialising on illnesses relating to endocrinology and metabolism, he served as the Undersecretary to the Ministry of Health between 2002 and 2007, after which he was elected as an AKP Member of Parliament. He was appointed as the rector of Ankara University on August 14, 2020.

He is married with three children and can speak fluent English.

== See also ==
- 23rd Parliament of Turkey
- 24th Parliament of Turkey
- 25th Parliament of Turkey
