= Müzeyyen Şevkin =

Turkish sociologist, academic, and politician

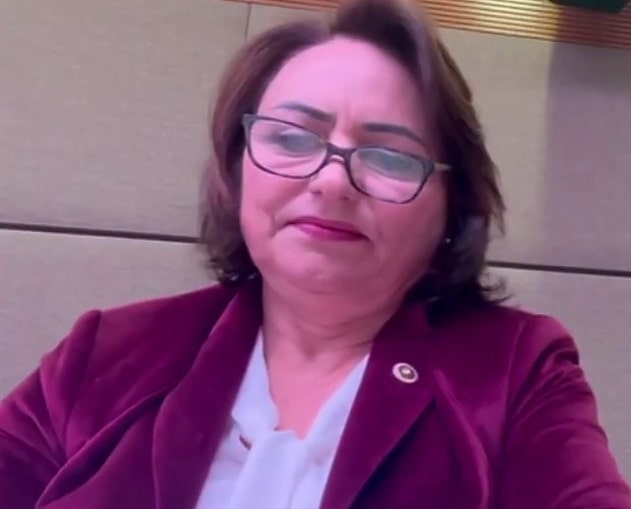

Member of the Grand National Assembly
- Incumbent
- Assumed office 7 July 2018
- Constituency: Adana (2018, 2023)

Personal details
- Born: 1961 (age 64–65) Adana, Turkey
- Party: Republican People's Party
- Education: Hacettepe University
- Occupation: Politician, sociologist, academic

Müzeyyen Şevkin is a Turkish sociologist, academic, and politician who has served as a Member of Parliament since 2018. Şevkin was elected as an MP representing Adana in the 2018 Turkish parliamentary election, as a member of the Republican People's Party (CHP).

Şevkin graduated from Hacettepe University's Faculty of Letters, Department of Sociology. She pursued an academic career in sociology, eventually attaining the rank of professor.
