= Radical Democratic Union =

Radical Democratic Union Radikal Demokratik Birlik
- Leader: İbrahim Eren
- Founded: 1985
- Dissolved: 1989
- Ideology: Environmentalism; LGBT rights

Radical Democratic Union (Turkish: Radikal Demokratik Birlik) was a Turkish political movement active in the 1980s. The movement was also known by names Radical Party, Radical Greens Party, Radical Democrat Green Party to the public.

Radical Democratic Union was founded in 1985. The chairman of its coordination committee was İbrahim Eren who was active in the Workers Party of Turkey prior to 1980 Turkish coup d'état and later at the Aegean Environmental Health Centre. The movement was inspired by the Radical Party and the German Green Party, aiming at uniting five tendencies, namely environmentalists, homosexuals, feminists, anti-militarists and atheists. The magazine Yeşil Barış (Green Peace) published by the movement also drew considerable attention from sex workers and transsexuals.

The media publicised the Radical Democratic Union as a "gay party" and the pressure on the movement subsequently increased. İbrahim Eren was arrested and stabbed in prison and at work. Poet Süha Tuğtepe who acted as the theoretician of the atheist tendency left Istanbul due to serious threats from Islamist circles. The events resulted in important splits from the movement. Many environmentalist members joined the Green Party founded in 1988 under Celal Ertuğ, a former government minister. İbrahim Eren faced conflicts of view regarding the 1989 local elections and left the movement, practically ending the Radical Democratic Union.
