= Seyfettin Yılmaz =

Turkish politician (born 1968)

Member of the Grand National Assembly
- In office 12 June 2011 – 7 July 2018
- Constituency: Adana (2011, June 2015, Nov 2015)

Personal details
- Born: February 2, 1968 (age 58) Pozantı, Adana, Turkey
- Party: Nationalist Movement Party (MHP)
- Education: Istanbul University
- Occupation: Politician

Seyfettin Yılmaz (born 2 February 1968) is a Turkish politician from the Nationalist Movement Party (MHP), who has served as a Member of Parliament for Adana since 2011.

Born in Pozantı, Adana, Yılmaz graduated from Istanbul University Faculty of Forestry. He was employed in the Adana Forestry Office, the General Office of Forestry and served as the interim manager of water works at the Adana Metropolitan Municipality. He was elected as a MHP Member of Parliament at the 2011 general election. He is married with one child and speaks English at a semi-fluent level.

== See also ==
- 25th Parliament of Turkey
