= Sevilay Çelenk Özen =

Turkish politician and writer (born 1977)

Sevilay Çelenk Özen (born 1967, Maden, Turkey) is an academic and politician, an Academic for Peace and a member of the Peoples' Equality and Democracy Party (DEM Party). Since June 2023, she is a member of the Grand National Assembly of Turkey representing Diyarbakir for the DEM Party. Before she was a staff member of the Ankara University.

== Early life and education ==
She was born in Maden in 1967, the hometown from her mother. Shortly after the family moved to Diyarbakir, the hometown from her father. Following she was raised in Diyarbakir. She graduated with a doctarate in communications from the Ankara University in 2003.

== Professional career ==
Between 2007 and 2009, she was a lecturer and visiting scholar at the Baltic Film and Media School of the Tallinn University in Estonia. Later, she was a member of the faculty staff of the Department of Communications in the Ankara University. In this capacity, she prepared a report on the death of a protester by a police officer in 2013 on request from the prosecution. In 2012, she was the President of the Ankara University Political Science alumni Association. She has published a variety of books on media and communications and is an Honorary Adjunct Research Professor at the Carleton University, Canada.

== Political career ==
She joined the Academics for Peace and was a signatory of their petition "We will not be a party to this crime!" in early 2016. A week before she signed the petition, she applied for a full professorship at the Ankara University, but was denied for signing the petition. Eventually she was dismissed from the Ankara University on the 6 January 2017 for supporting terrorism. Following she provided students with lectures in a park in Ankara. In 2019, she was acquitted of terror propaganda from the Constitutional Court, but was not reinstated at the Ankara University due to concerns of the State of Emergency Commission. In the parliamentary elections of May 2023, she was elected into the Grand National Assembly of Turkey representing Diyarbakir for the YSP.
