= Aydın Ayas =

Turkish politician

- Born: 1946 (age 79–80)
- Occupation: politician,

Aydın Ayas (born 1946) is a Turkish dentist and last President of the Greens Party (Turkey) (founded in 1988), that closed down in 1994.

== Early life ==
Born in 1946 to a family that left Crete during the 1923 Population exchange between Greece and Turkey between Greece and Turkey, Ayas went Karabuk Demir Celik High school in Karabuk. He received his diploma in Dental School at Istanbul University.

== Political career ==
Ayas went to work to Germany in 1973 and returned to Turkey in the year of the military coup (1980). Highly influenced by the politics of the Grunen Alliance '90/The Greens in Germany, especially also Joseph Beuys 's global call, he joined Celal Ertuğ, former Health Minister of Turkey, in his political mission, namely the Greens Party (Turkey). Ayas was the party's third and last President, which got shut down in 1994. Ayas is the eco-liberal turn for the party. More about his work can be found in various books and archives.
