= Equality and Democracy Party =

Equality and Democracy Party Eşitlik ve Demokrasi Partisi
- Founded: 14 March 2010
- Dissolved: 25 November 2012
- Preceded by: Social Democratic People's Party
- Succeeded by: Greens and the Left Party of the Future
- Headquarters: Uğur Mumcu Caddesi No: 47, Gaziosmanpaşa, Ankara
- Ideology: Left-libertarianism; Social liberalism
- Political position: Centre-left
- Colours: Purple, Yellow

Equality and Democracy Party (Eşitlik ve Demokrasi Partisi, EDP) was a left-libertarian and social liberal political party in Turkey. It was founded on 14 March 2010 by Ziya Halis. Halis, of Alevi descent, was a former MP for the Social Democratic People's Party (SHP) and Minister of Employment and Social Security.

A significant segment of the Libertarian Left Movement, which had broken away from the Freedom and Solidarity Party, played an active role in the formation of EDP from the start, along with many other independent individuals. Individuals who later resigned from the Freedom and Solidarity Party in the Izmir, Istanbul, Ankara, Tokat, Manisa and Aydin provinces also joined the EDP.

In short, the EDP was able to fulfill the requirements for a party to participate in the general elections, namely having organised in a certain number of provinces and undergone a number of party congresses. The Supreme Electoral Council of Turkey thus granted the party the right to participate in the 2011 Turkish general election along with 26 other parties. However, the party decided to support the Labour, Democracy and Freedom Bloc and therefore did not present a list of candidates to the SEC.

The party was disbanded preceding the launch of the Greens and the Left Party of the Future on 25 November 2012 together with the Greens and some independent individuals.
