= Labourist Movement Party =

Labourist Movement Party Emekçi Hareket Partisi
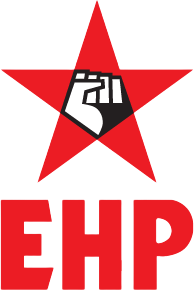
- Abbreviation: EHP
- President: Hakan Öztürk
- Founded: 5 January 2004
- Preceded by: Revolutionary Youth Federation of Turkey; Freedom and Solidarity Party; Socialist Democracy Party
- Headquarters: Ankara
- Membership (2026): ▲361
- Ideology: Communism; Marxism–Leninism
- Political position: Far-left
- National affiliation: United June Movement; Labour and Freedom Alliance (Since 2022); Green Left Party (for 2023 election)

Website
- www.EHP.org.tr

The Labourist Movement Party (Turkish: Emekçi Hareket Partisi, EHP) is a Marxist–Leninist communist party in Turkey.

The Labourist Movement Party is one of the components in the United June Movement, a political coalition initiative which was founded after Gezi Park revolt. In 2022, EHP became a part of the Labour and Freedom Alliance to take part in the upcoming general elections in Turkey.
