= Social Freedom Party =

Social Freedom Party Toplumsal Özgürlük Partisi
- President: Şilan Sürmeli
- Spokesperson: Perihan Koca; Pelin Kahiloğulları; Juliana Gözen
- Founded: 9 March 2020
- Split from: Socialist Refoundation Party
- Headquarters: Süleyman Ayten Cad. Çiçek İş Merkezi No: 37/8 Mamak, Ankara
- Membership (2026): ▲369
- Ideology: Socialism; Libertarian socialism; Eco-socialism; Socialist feminism; Anti-capitalism; Anti-imperialism; LGBT rights; Minority rights; Democratic republicanism
- Political position: Left-wing to far-left
- National affiliation: Peoples' Democratic Congress; Labour and Freedom Alliance; Green Left Party (for 2023 elections)
- Colors: Yellow and Red

Website
- https://toplumsalozgurluk.org

The Social Freedom Party (Turkish: Toplumsal Özgürlük Partisi, TÖP) is a political party in Turkey, founded on 9 March 2020. Initially a part of Socialist Refoundation Party (SYKP), the group broke away from the SYKP in 2013 and established the Social Freedom Party Initiative (TÖPG), prior to declaring TÖP as a party in 2020. The party is noteworthy for the focus it puts on women's leadership and women's labour issues, in particular its women's organisation Purple Solidarity.

TÖP is a participant of Peoples' Democratic Congress and a member of Labour and Freedom Alliance. Perihan Koca was elected to the 28th Parliament of Turkey in the 2023 Turkish parliamentary election from Mersin.

== History ==
The Social Freedom Party (Turkish: Toplumsal Özgürlük Partisi, TÖP) is a political party in Turkey, founded on 9 March 2020. Initially a part of Socialist Refoundation Party, the group broke away from the SYKP in 2013 and established the Social Freedom Party Initiative (TÖPG), prior to declaring TÖP as a party in 2020.

Perihan Koca is one of three spokespersons of the party, alongside Pelin Kahiloğulları and Juliana Gözen. The party is noteworthy for the focus it puts on women's leadership and women's labour issues, in particular its women's organisation Purple Solidarity.

The party's ideology and political programme is heavily influenced by Hikmet Kıvılcımlı and his works. TÖP is a participant of Peoples' Democratic Congress and a member of Labour and Freedom Alliance.

In terms of international outlook, like most of the Peoples' Democratic Congress organisations, the Social Freedom Party is known to condemn Turkish and NATO militarism as well as Russian expansion, as in the case of the 2022 Russian invasion of Ukraine.

Perihan Koca, one of the party's spokespeople, was elected to the 28th Parliament of Turkey in the 2023 Turkish parliamentary election from Mersin.
