= Peoples' Democratic Congress =

Political movement in Turkey

Peoples' Democratic Congress Turkish: Halkların Demokratik Kongresi
- Spokesman: Cengiz Çiçek
- Spokeswoman: Esengül Demir
- Founded: 15 October 2011; 13 years ago
- Preceded by: Labour, Democracy and Freedom Bloc
- Political wing: Peoples' Equality and Democracy Party (DEM Party)
- Ideology: Democratic socialism Anti-capitalism; Minority rights
- Political position: Left-wing
- National affiliation: Labour and Freedom Alliance
- Colours: Purple

Website
- www.halklarindemokratikkongresi.net

The Peoples' Democratic Congress (Turkish: Halkların Demokratik Kongresi, HDK) is a union of numerous left-wing political movements, organisations and parties in Turkey that aims to fundamentally recreate Turkish politics and represent oppressed, exploited individuals who face ethnic, religious or gender discrimination. The Congress is anti-capitalist and was formed on 15 October 2011. It organises numerous conferences and holds official congresses. In 2012, the Congress established a new party that would act as its political wing, the Peoples' Democratic Party (HDP). A similar union of left-wing groups, the United June Movement, was formed in 2014.

== Formation ==
In preparation for the 2011 general election, the Peace and Democracy Party (BDP) and several smaller parties fielded joint candidates as independents, under the 'Labour, Democracy and Freedom Bloc' banner. The purpose was to by-pass the 10% election threshold needed by parties to gain representation in the Grand National Assembly. 35 of the 61 candidates that ran under the Bloc were elected. After the election, these parties came together with smaller LGBT rights movements and others to form the Peoples' Democratic Congress in October 2011, with Ertuğrul Kürkçü and Sebahat Tuncel as the spokesman and spokeswoman respectively.

== Aims ==
The Congress aims to provide a platform for oppressed and exploited individual as well as minorities facing religious or ethnic discrimination. The Congress also is strongly in favour of women's rights and thus operates a co-leader system with one male and one female spokesperson. The Congress aims to represent Kurdish minority in particular and is critical of the lack of constitutional enshrinement of minority rights. Other minorities that the Congress aims to represent are Alevis, Armenians, Assyrians, Azerbaijanis, Circassians, Laz, the LGBT community and Romani. The Congress is heavily critical of capitalism and what they see as the exploitation of workers.

Politically, the Congress is democratic socialist and has its political interests represented by the Peoples' Democratic Party. The Democratic Regions Party is also affiliated with the Congress but runs for local government positions in the Kurdish majority south-east only.

== Participants ==
- 78'ers Initiative
- Confederation of Revolutionary Trade Unions of Turkey
  - Cam Keramik İş
  - Gıda-İş
  - Limter İş
  - Tekstil-Sen
- Democracy and Freedom Movement (DÖH)
- Democratic Free Women's Movement (DÖKH)
- Democratic Pomak Movement
- Democratic Regions Party (DBP)
- Free Democratic Alevi Movement
- Global Action Group (KEG)
- Hevi LGBTİ
- Democratic Islamic Congress
- İstanbul LGBTT
- Kaldıraç
- Kaos Gay and Lesbian Cultural Research and Solidarity Association (KAOS GL)
- Labour Party (EMEP)
- Marxist Attitude
- Munzur Protection Board
- New Awakening
- Partizan
- Party of the Greens and the Left Future (YSGP)
- Peoples' Democratic Party (HDP)
- Peoples' Equality and Democracy Party (DEM)
- Rainbow Women's Association
- Revolutionary Socialist Workers' Party (DSİP)
- Social Freedom Party (TÖP)
- Socialist Party of the Oppressed (ESP)
- Socialist Refoundation Party (SYKP)
- Socialist Solidarity Platform (SODAP)
- Solidarity with the Palestinian People (FHDD)
- Teori Politika
- Theory and Society: Kurdish Studies
- Tüm Köy Sen
- Turkey Truth
- Voice of Labor

In addition, Socialist Alternative is not a participant in the HDK but is broadly supportive of it.

== See also ==
- United June Movement
- Peoples' United Revolutionary Movement
