= Green Party (Turkey, 1988) =

Political party in Turkey

Green Party Yeşiller Partisi
- Leader: Bilge Contepe
- Founded: 1988
- Dissolved: 1994
- Ideology: Green politics

The Green Party (Turkish: Yeşiller Partisi) was the first green party established in Turkey.

== Background ==
Emphasizing that the relations between people cannot be separated from the relationship between man and nature, the party was an important part of the anti-nuclear movement. The party had a strong emphasis on peace in their program and defined themselves in a natural solidarity with women's movements. The party stated that they were a brand new alternative that did not originate from any political thought that existed today, and that was born without replacing an old party.

Its last chairman was Bilge Contepe. It was closed in 1994 on the grounds that it did not submit its final accounts. Its successor is the Green Party, which was founded in 2008.
