= Aydın Uslupehlivan =

Turkish politician

Aydın Uslupehlivan MP

Member of the Grand National Assembly
- Incumbent
- Assumed office 7 June 2015
- Constituency: Adana (June 2015, Nov 2015)

Personal details
- Born: January 1, 1954 (age 72) Adana, Turkey
- Party: Republican People's Party (CHP)
- Education: Çukurova University
- Occupation: Politician
- Profession: Engineer

Aydın Uslupehlivan (born 1 January 1954) is a Turkish politician from the Republican People's Party (CHP). He has served as a Member of Parliament for Adana since 7 June 2015.

Born in Adana, Uslupehlivan graduated from Çukurova University as an engineer and worked in the private sector for 26 years.

== Politics ==
He began his political career in the CHP at the age of 22, first as a member of the party's youth wing and later as a municipal councillor for the Seyhan and Adana Municipalities after the 2014 local elections. He served as the Deputy Mayor of Seyhan before being elected as a CHP Member of Parliament at the June 2015 general election.

== See also ==
- 25th Parliament of Turkey
