= Tülay Hatimoğulları =

Turkish economist and politician (born 1977)

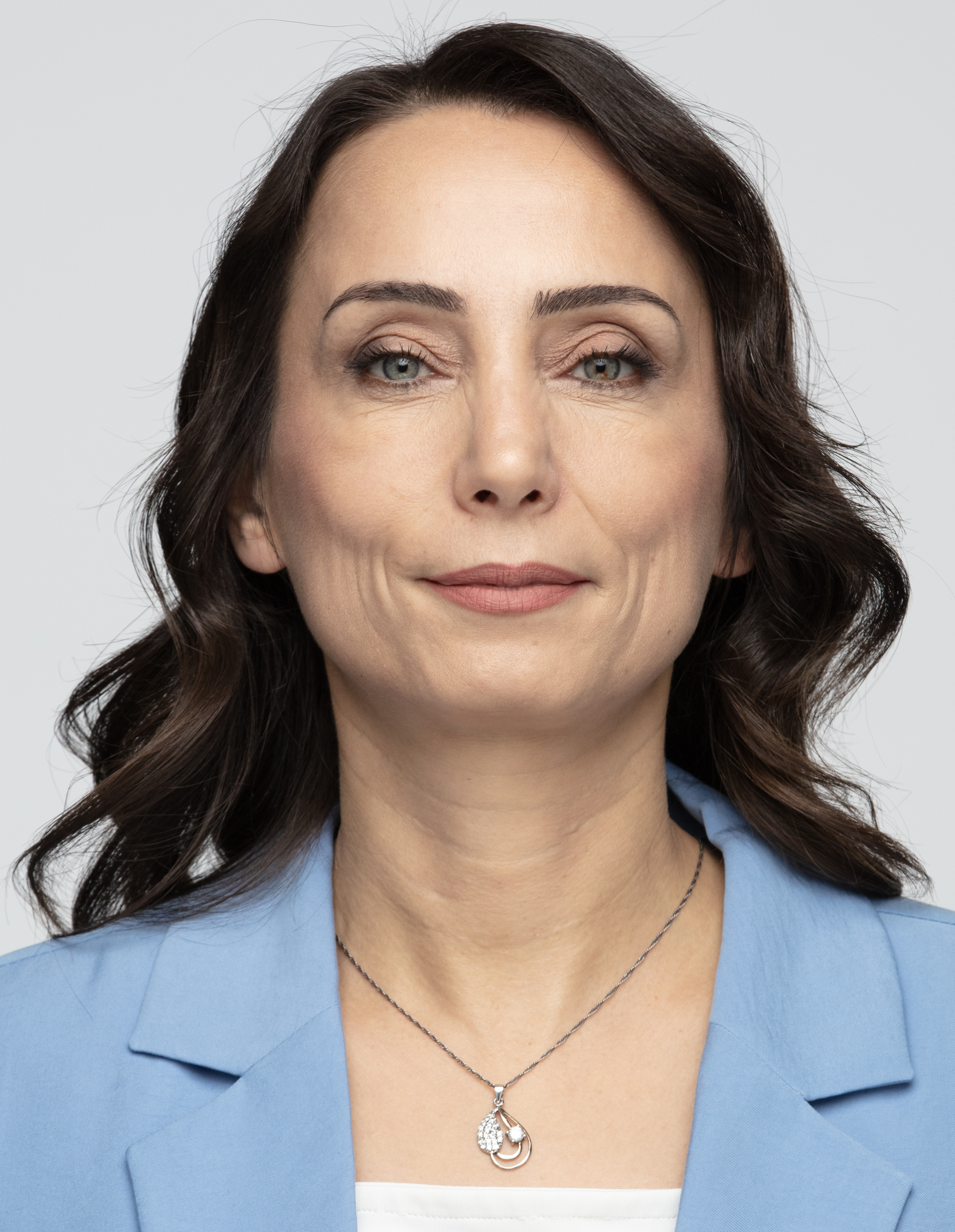
- Hatimoğulları in 2023

Co-Leader of the Peoples' Equality and Democracy Party (DEM Party)
- Incumbent
- Assumed office 15 October 2023 Serving with Tuncer Bakırhan

Member of the Grand National Assembly of Turkey
- Incumbent
- Assumed office 7 July 2018
- Constituency: Adana (2018, 2023)

Co-Chair of the Socialist Refoundation Party
- In office 25–26 June 2016 – 13–14 October 2018 Serving with Ahmet Kaya

Personal details
- Born: 1977 (age 48–49) Samandağ, Hatay, Turkey
- Party: DEM Party (2023-present)
- Other political affiliations: Socialist Refoundation Party (2013-2018); Peoples' Democratic Party (2018-2023)
- Education: Anadolu University

Tülay Hatimoğulları Oruç (born 1977) is a Turkish linguistic rights activist and politician. She is the co-chair of the Peoples' Equality and Democracy Party and a member of the Grand National Assembly of Turkey.

== Early life and education ==
Tülay Hatimoğulları Oruç was born in 1977 in Samandağ, Hatay in an Arab Alawite family. She studied economics at Anadolu University. She speaks fluent Arabic and Turkish.

== Political career ==
Hatimoğulları giving a political speech in her mother tongue, Levantine Arabic.

Her adherence to political socialism defined itself during high school. Tulay Hatimoğulları Oruç was elected co-chair of the SYKP in 2016. In the parliamentary elections of June 2018 she was elected to the Grand National Assembly of Turkey representing the Adana Province for the Peoples' Democratic Party (HDP). On the 17 March 2021, the Turkish state prosecutor before the Court of Cassation, Bekir Şahin filed a lawsuit at the Constitutional Court demanding for her and 686 other politicians a five-year ban for political activities.

=== Political views ===
As the co-chair of the Religion and Faith Commission of the HDP, she defends the protection of the cultural rights of the minorities in Turkey according to the Treaty of Lausanne from 1923. She opposed the deployment of Turkish troops to Libya. She is also on the view that Kurdistan exists, which in November 2021 prompted a trilateral discussion between her, fellow HDP Politician Garo Paylan, and the Turkish Defense Minister Hulusi Akar who denied the existence of a Kurdistan, be it in Turkey or Iraq. When in May 2022 several performances of Kurdish artists were banned, she demanded information whether there existed an order from the Turkish Government banning such performances.

Oruç criticizes the contact ban imposed on Abdullah Öcalan, the leader of the Kurdistan Workers’ Party (PKK), and calls for his release, and also identifies the "Kurdish problem" and the "Palestinian problem" as two significant challenges in the region that democratic confederalism can potentially resolve.

=== Linguistic rights ===
Hatimoğulları has been an advocate for linguistic rights, shaped in part by her own experiences as an Arabic speaker in Turkey. She has shared that she learned Turkish only at the age of seven and faced difficulties in primary school due to her limited proficiency in the language. Following the 1980 coup, she recalled that teachers assigned to her region often prioritized teaching Turkish through strict and harsh methods. These experiences fostered her empathy toward the Kurdish community, who faced similar challenges regarding their language rights. Later in life, Hatimoğulları became involved in Arabic-language theater and music, but she and her peers faced pressure and legal challenges for performing in their mother tongue. This further strengthened her solidarity with the Kurdish freedom movement, from which she has said Arab socialists like herself learned the importance of organizing to protect their language and identity.

== Personal life ==
She was raised in an Arab household and identifies as a feminist and an Alawite.
