= Tuncer Bakırhan =

Kurdish politician (born 1970)

Tuncer Bakırhan MP
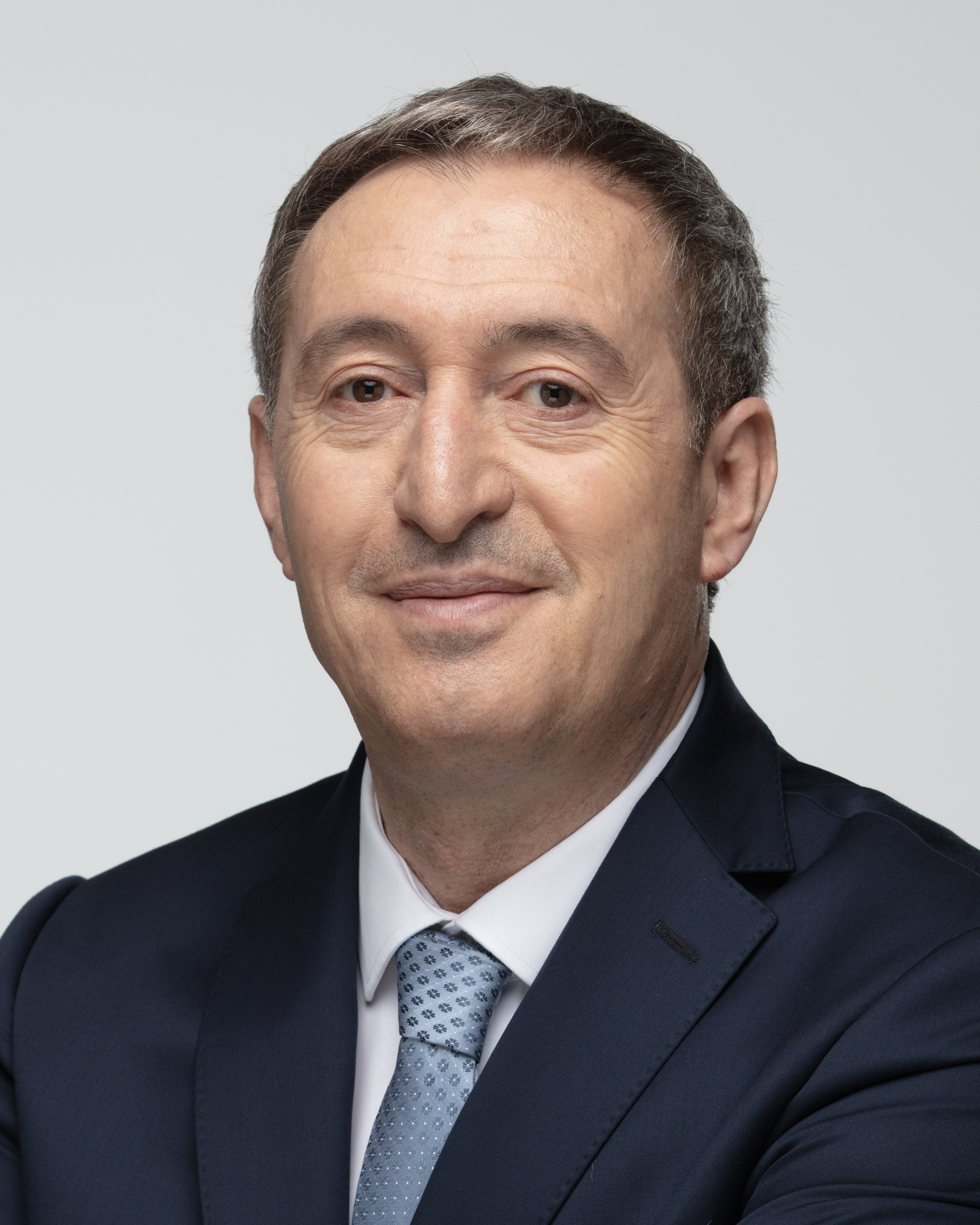
- Bakırhan in 2023

Co-Leader of the Peoples' Equality and Democracy Party (DEM)
- Incumbent
- Assumed office 13 October 2023 Serving with Tulay Hatımoğulları Oruç

Mayor of Siirt
- In office 4 April 2014 – 17 November 2016
- Preceded by: Selim Sadak
- Succeeded by: Ceyhun Dilşad Taşkın (trustee)

Chairman of the Democratic People's Party (DEHAP)
- In office 2003–2005
- Preceded by: Mehmet Abbasoğlu
- Succeeded by: Office Abolished

Member of the Grand National Assembly
- Incumbent
- Assumed office 2 June 2023
- Constituency: Siirt (2023)

Personal details
- Born: 1970 (age 55–56) Susuz, Kars, Turkey
- Party: DEM Party
- Other political affiliations: Peace and Democracy Party; Democratic Society Party; Peoples Labour Party; People's Democracy Party

Tuncer Bakırhan (born 1970 in Susuz, Kars) is a Turkish politician of Kurdish ethnicity and current co-leader of the DEM Party. He is a former chairman of the Democratic People's Party (DEHAP) and the former Mayor of Siirt. He was dismissed from his duties as mayor by the Turkish ministry of the interior, arrested and sentenced to 10 years in prison.

== Early life and education ==
He grew up in Susuz and attended his primary and secondary education in Kars and studied at the Uludağ University in Bursa. During his studies he was detained and accused for supporting the Kurdistan Workers' Party (PKK) but released shortly after.

== Political career ==
He began to be involved in the youth wing of the People's Labour Party (HEP) in 1989 and was a candidate for Kars in the local election 1999, but was not elected. Later he was elected the party chairmen of the People's Democracy Party (HADEP) for the province of Kars. After the HADEP was closed down in 2003 he joined the DEHAP.

He was elected chairman of the DEHAP on the second extraordinary party congress in June 2003. In the parliamentary election in 2002 his party received the most votes in his electoral district but could not assume due to the fact that the party did not pass the electoral threshold. Under his leadership, the party initiated a peace campaign for the conflict between the PKK and the Turkish Government and he called for a general amnesty for the members of the PKK in order to facilitate the rebels to participate in the political process. The DEHAP dissolved itself in November 2005 and following he joined the Democratic Society Party (DTP) and became the parties vice chairmen. He was the DTP candidate for Esenyurt in the local elections 2009, but was not elected. In the local elections in 2014 he was elected the Mayor of Siirt for the Peace and Democracy Party (BDP). He was dismissed by the Ministry of Interior in November 2016 and detained the same day. He was formally arrested on the 16 December 2016 and in July 2018 he was sentenced to 10 years imprisonment for being a member of terrorist organization and making propaganda for a terrorist organization. He was arrested for 2 years and 11 months before his release.

The European Court of Human Rights ruled against Turkey over his arrest in September 2021 ordered to pay Bakırhan the sum of 10'000 Euros.

In the parliamentary elections of May 2023, he was elected into the Grand National Assembly of Turkey for representing the Green Left Party (YSP) for Siirt.

=== Other legal prosecution ===
During his political career he was prosecuted many times often relating to "freedom of expression". In 2004 he was prosecuted for saying hello and good bye in Kurdish during an election rally. He was arrested on 17 January 2012 due to an investigation in the Kurdistan Communities Union (KCK) and released from prison on the 30 April 2013.
