= Democratic Regions Party =

Political party in Turkey

Democratic Regions Party Demokratik Bölgeler Partisi Partiya Herêman a Demokratîk
- Abbreviation: DBP
- Leader: Çiğdem Kılıçgün Uçar; Keskin Bayındır (co-chair)
- Founded: 2 May 2008 (as Peace and Democracy Party); 11 July 2014 (rebranding)
- Preceded by: Peace and Democracy Party
- Headquarters: Barış Manço Cad. 32. Sk. No:37, Balgat – Ankara, Turkey
- Membership (2026): ▼6,832
- Ideology: Kurdish nationalism Secularism; Social democracy Democratic socialism Regionalism
- Political position: Left-wing
- National affiliation: Peoples' Democratic Congress; Labour and Freedom Alliance; Kurdish Freedom and Democracy Alliance
- Colors: Green, Red and Yellow
- Grand National Assembly: 2 / 600

The Democratic Regions Party (Turkish: Demokratik Bölgeler Partisi, DBP, Kurdish: Partiya Herêman a Demokratîk, PHD) is a Kurdish political party in the Republic of Turkey. The pro-minority rights Peoples' Democratic Party (HDP) acts as the fraternal party to DBP.

== Development ==
After the 2014 municipal elections, Peoples' Democratic Party and the pro-Kurdish Peace and Democracy Party (BDP) were re-organised in a joint structure. On 28 April 2014, the entire parliamentary caucus of BDP joined HDP, whereas BDP was assigned exclusively to representatives on the local administration level. The BDP has been said to be more hardline, arguably with closer PKK links, than its parent HDP.

At the 3rd Congress of BDP on 11 July 2014, the name of the party was changed to the Democratic Regions Party and a new structure restricting the activities on the local/regional government level was adopted.

On 30 November 2019, Saliha Aydeniz became the Co-Chair of the party.

On November 12, 2023, Çiğdem Kılıçgün Uçar and Keskin Bayındır were elected as the new co-Chairpersons of the Democratic Regions Party.
