= Peoples' Democratic Party closure case (2021–present) =

Case in Turkey

- Court: Constitutional Court of Turkey
- Full case name: Chief Public Prosecutor of the Supreme Court of Appeals of Turkey, in the name of the People of the Republic of Turkey, v. Peoples' Democratic Party

Court membership
- Chief judge: Zühtü Arslan (president): Hasan Tahsin Gökcan; Kadir Özkaya (vice presidents)
- Associate judges: Engin Yıldırım; Muammer Topal; Emin Kuz; Rıdvan Güleç; Recai Akyel; Yusuf Şevki Hakyemez; Yıldız Seferinoğlu; Selahaddin Menteş; Basri Bağcı; İrfan Fidan; Kenan Yaşar; Muhterem İnce

Laws applied
- Constitution §§ 68/4, 69/6; Political Parties Law §§ 101/1-b, 103/2

Keywords
- party closure

The Peoples' Democratic Party closure case refers to a legal procedure during which the Peoples' Democratic Party (HDP) is threatened with closure while hundreds of its politicians face a political ban for five years. The HDP was accused to have organizational ties with the Kurdistan Workers' Party (PKK). While the party's closure case was ongoing, HDP decided to transfer its political activities to the Peoples' Equality and Democracy Party (DEM).

== Background ==
In the past, several pro Kurdish parties have been banned, and pro-Kurdish politicians often face legal prosecution and prison terms. The Ministry of the Interior has dismissed dozens of elected HDP mayors since the Municipal Elections held in March 2019, while more than hundred politicians are threatened with life sentences due to the Kobane protests which supported the Kurdish population in Kobanî during the Siege of Kobanî led by the Islamic State (IS). The HDP was accused of being a terrorist organization by several representatives of the Turkish Government and its closure was demanded by the MHP leader Devlet Bahçeli. Bahçeli insinuated that if a closure case was not initiated by the state prosecutor, the MHP itself would demand its closure over the Turkish Party Law. The Turkish President Recep Tayyip Erdoğan as well called the party leaders terrorists. MP Meral Danış Bestaş stated that the judiciary would be able to close down the Party, but the movement of the party would not be able to be closed. The party co-chair, Mithat Sancar, stated that the movement would just regroup in another party as they have done so in the past when pro-Kurdish parties were closed. The same day as the lawsuit against the HDP was filed, a HDP MP Ömer Faruk Gergerlioglu was stripped of his parliamentary immunity. For the closure of the party a majority of two thirds of the judges of the Constitutional Court would have to rule accordingly.

== Indictment ==
The Court of Cassations initiated an investigation into the HDP regarding an eventual indictment since the 2 March 2021. On the 17 March 2021, the State Prosecutor to the Court of Cassation Bekir Şahin filed a lawsuit before the Constitutional Court demanding the closure of the HDP. The indictment included accusations of organizational ties with the PKK and to work against the unity of the state. The membership of the legally existing Democratic Society Congress (DTK) was deemed enough evidence for a membership in a criminal organization. The indictment also called for a five-year ban for 687 HDP politicians to be involved in political activities, amongst them all party chairs since its existence. Zühtü Arslan, the president of the Constitutional Court instated a rapporteur responsible to verify if the indictment ahead of an examination of the courts judges. But upon the rapporteurs request, the Constitutional Court returned the indictment to the State Prosecutor of the Court of Cassation on the 31 March, alleging procedural deficiencies which should be rectified. On the 7 June 2021, the state prosecutor provided the Constitutional Court with an adapted indictment of 850 pages, confirming his demand for a closure of the party, while lowering the demand a political ban for 451 politicians, which was accepted by the court on the 21 June 2021.

== Defense ==
In November 2021, the HDP presented their written defense to the Constitutional Court together with the ruling of the European Court of Human Rights (ECHR) on the closure case of the Democratic Society Party (DTP) in which Turkey was convicted and ordered to pay a remuneration. The defense team condemned the fact that investigations are used as evidence for a political ban of 451 HDP politicians by the prosecution and maintained the view that for what the party is mainly accused of, are their efforts for the solution of the Kurdish Turkish conflict during the peace process between 2013 and 2015. The right for peace is guaranteed by several international conventions and efforts in a peace building process should not become a subject matter for the closure case. The party was also invited to present a verbal defense until the 14 March, but on request of the HDP, it was deferred to the 11 April. A further request to postpone the verbal defense until after the parliamentary election on the 14 May 2023 was refused by the court. On 6 April, the HDP announced it would not present a verbal defense. For the parliamentary election in 2023, the HDP ran under the umbrella of the Party of Greens and the Left Future (YSGP).

== Reactions ==
=== International ===
The closure of one of the largest parties in Turkey has been seen as undemocratic and authoritarian by several Western political observers. The case has largely been closed since March 2021, the events are widely viewed in the context of Erdogan's poor grip on power notably in the Kurdish majority regions of Turkey. The United States Department of State opposed the eventual closure of the HDP, as it would be contrary to democratic rights and undermine the voters will of a large part of Turkey’s population. Germany and Nacho Sanchez Amor, the EU rapporteur on Turkey also criticized the indictment. On the 8 July 2021, the European Parliament condemned the attempts to close the party by the Turkish Judiciary, alleging that the party has been oppressed since a long time with hundreds of HDP offices attacked in the years 2015–2016, has around 4000 members imprisoned including the former party co-chair Selahattin Demirtaş who despite favorable ruling for his release by the European Court of Human Rights was not allowed to leave the prison. As in April 2023 the president of the German Social Democratic Party (SPD) Lars Klingbeil was to meet the Turkish Foreign Minister Mevlüt Çavuşoğlu, Çavuşoğlu cancelled the meeting over a social media post from Klingbeil critical to the closure case.

=== Domestic ===
The communication director to the Turkish President Fahrettin Altun defended the indictment and alleged the organizational ties between the HDP and the PKK and that the PKK is a designated terrorist organization by several countries. Devlet Bahçeli criticized the return of the indictment to the Court of Cassation, requesting a closure of the Constitutional Court while also demanding the state prosecutor to rectify the deficiencies in order enable to closure of the HDP. Politicians of the HDP alleged that the party can not just be shut down, the party is not only a party, but also an idea which would endure an eventual closure of the party. Making reference to the revelations about government corruption by crime boss Sedat Peker, the HDP accused the AKP of wanting to "update its power" with the closure case. The same day as the Constitutional Court accepted the second indictment, HDP co-chair Mithat Sancar lamented that the court accepted it despite the attack on the HDP headquarters in Izmir in which Deniz Poyraz was murdered and accused the MHP and the AKP to have campaigned for months for their closure stating "They made statements on various platforms, portraying the HDP as an enemy".

== See also ==
- 2008 Justice and Development Party closure trial
- Democratic Society Party closure case
