= Bilal Bilici =

Turkish politician

- Born: Adana, Turkey
- Education: Boston University, Bahçeşehir University
- Political party: Republican People's Party
- Father: Mehmet Ali Bilici
- Website: http://bilalbilici.com/

Bilal Bilici (born 1984) is a Turkish politician. He was elected to parliament in the 2023 general election from Adana as a Good Party member.

== Biography ==
He was born in 1984 in Adana. His father is Mehmet Ali Bilici, a businessman and politician who served three terms as an Adana deputy in the Turkish Grand National Assembly. He completed his higher education in the Department of Economics at Boston University.

He worked as a consultant in the Boston office of Ernst & Young and Accenture. He worked in the oil and petrochemical industry in Dubai.

In Turkey, he served on the Board of Directors of Bilici Holding. He continued his Master's program in Global Politics and International Relations at Bahçeşehir University. His thesis titled "The rise of populism and the radical right in European politics: The case of the Freedom Party of Austria (FPÖ)" (2020) and received his master's degree.

In 2020, he joined the Marmara Group Strategic and Social Research Foundation. He took part in the Foreign Economic Relations Board under the Ministry of Economy. In 2021, he was appointed Honorary Consul of Guatemala in Istanbul. He took part in the board of directors of the World Honorary Consuls Association, which includes honorary consuls working in Turkey and affiliated to the Republic of Turkey.

In 2022, he was appointed as the advisor to the chairman of the Good Party's US representation.

In the 2023 Turkish general elections, he was elected as MP from Adana for the Good Party.

On 15 May 2024, he resigned from Good Party. On 20 August 2024 he joined the Republican People's Party.

== Academic and policy work ==
In 2025, Bilici was selected as part of the 20th-anniversary cohort of the Fisher Family Summer Fellows on Democracy and Development at Stanford University's Center on Democracy, Development and the Rule of Law (CDDRL). During the fellowship, he engaged with academic research on democratic governance and collaborated with scholars including Larry Diamond and Francis Fukuyama .

Bilici has written opinion articles on democracy, geopolitics, and Türkiye’s strategic role in transatlantic relations. He also appeared as a guest on H.R. McMaster’s Battlegrounds program at the Hoover Institution, discussing Türkiye’s geopolitical position and domestic political developments.

In 2026, Bilici participated in the Hoover Institution International Seminar at Stanford University, a program that brings together foreign and defense policy professionals from around the world with U.S. scholars and policymakers. He was also selected as one of ten elected officials from around the world for the 2026 International Democracy Fellowship at the Eurasia Group's Institute for Global Affairs.

== New Party ==
The 38th Ordinary Congress in November 2023 and the 21st Extraordinary Congress in April 2025 of the Republican People's Party (CHP) were ordered by a court to be annulled due to a ruling of "absolute nullity" issued in the lawsuit. As a result of the court order, interim suspension of the elected party leader Özgür Özel and the party leadership occurred, and Kemal Kılıçdaroğlu and the party bodies existing prior to the congress were restored and continued to perform their duties. As the court-appointed leadership did not set an appropriate early new congress date, the founding of a new party became inevitable for a fraction of the party. 91 CHP parliamentarians, among them Bilici, resigned from their party, and founded the New Party on 24 July 2026.
