= Socialist Refoundation Party =

Turkish political party

Socialist Refoundation Party Sosyalist Yeniden Kuruluş Partisi
- Abbreviation: SYKP
- Leader: Feray Yılmaz Mertoğlu; Mertcan Titiz
- Founded: 24 June 2013
- Headquarters: Olgunlar Sokak No: 2/11 Bakanlıklar Çankaya, Ankara
- Membership (2026): ▼360
- Ideology: Socialism; Marxism–Leninism; Socialist feminism; Proletarian internationalism; Anti-imperialism; Anti-capitalism; Anti-globalization; Secularism
- Political position: Far-left
- National affiliation: Peoples' Democratic Congress
- International affiliation: Progressive International
- Colours: Red, Purple, Green

Website
- https://sykp.org.tr/

Socialist Refoundation Party (Turkish: Sosyalist Yeniden Kuruluş Partisi, SYKP) is a Marxist–Leninist and socialist feminist political party in Turkey. It was founded on 24 June 2013 as a merger of far-left factions Social Freedom Party Initiative, Workers' Socialist Party, Socialist Future Party Initiative, and the Movement for Socialist Unity. Latter, Social Freedom Party Initiative broke away from the SYKP foundation process and later evolved into Social Freedom Party. Party has a tri-coloured star as its logo, red representing socialism, purple for feminism and green for environment.

The party is one of the participants in the People's Democratic Congress (HDK), a political initiative instrumental in founding the Peoples' Democratic Party in 2012.
