= Keskin Bayındır =

Turkish politician (born 1984)

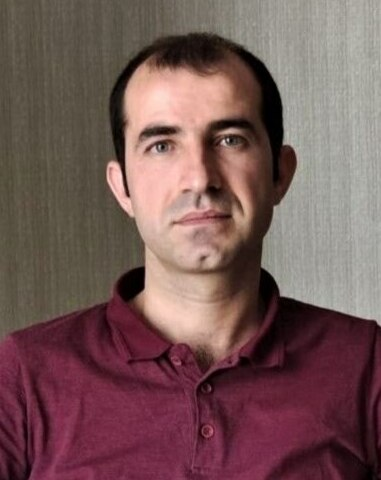
- Bayındır in 2022

Member of the Grand National Assembly
- Incumbent
- Assumed office 2 June 2023
- Constituency: Batman

Personal details
- Born: 1984 (age 41–42)
- Party: Democratic Regions Party (since 2019)

Keskin Bayındır (born 1984) is a Turkish politician serving as a member of the Grand National Assembly since 2023. He has served as co-chairman of the Democratic Regions Party since 2019.
