= Çiğdem Kılıçgün Uçar =

Turkish politician (born 1976)

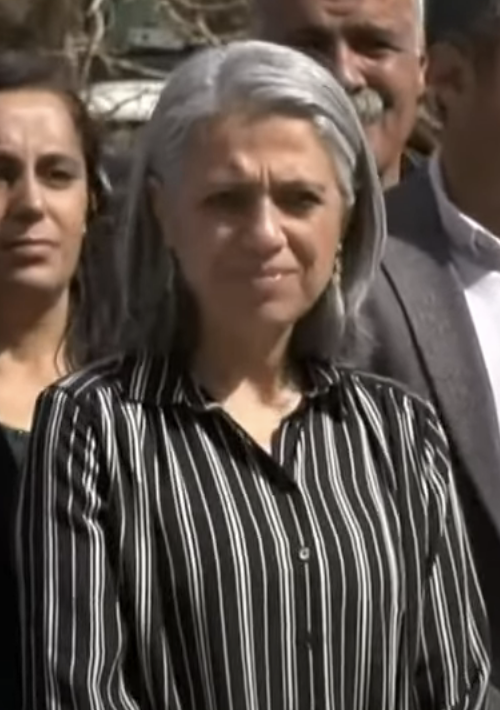
Çiğdem Kılıçgün Uçar in 2023.

Çiğdem Kılıçgün Uçar (born 1976) is a Turkish politician who is co-leader of the Democratic Regions Party. She was elected to the Grand National Assembly of Turkey from Istanbul 3rd district in the 2023 Turkish parliamentary election.
