= Green Left Party =

Green Turkish political party

Party of Greens and the Left Future Yeşiller ve Sol Gelecek Partisi
- Abbreviation: YEŞİL SOL PARTİ (official); YSP, YSGP (unofficial)
- Co-Spokespersons: Ahmet Asena; Didem Betül Göçer
- Founded: 25 November 2012 (first); 24 November 2023 (second)
- Merger of: Equality and Democracy Party; Greens Party (first)
- Merged into: Peoples' Equality and Democracy Party (first)
- Headquarters: Atatürk Bulvarı No:88 Daire: 16 Çankaya – Ankara
- Membership (2026): ▲568
- Ideology: Green politics Left-libertarianism; Anti-capitalism; Alter-globalization; Direct democracy Secularism; Anti-Zionism
- Political position: Centre-left to left-wing
- National affiliation: Peoples' Democratic Congress; Labour and Freedom Alliance
- European affiliation: European Green Party associate member
- International affiliation: Global Greens
- Colours: Green, Red
- Grand National Assembly: 0 / 600

Website
- yesilsolparti.org

The Party of Greens and the Left Future (Turkish: Yeşiller ve Sol Gelecek Partisi, YSGP), abbreviated as Green Left Party (Turkish: Yeşil Sol Parti, YSP), is a green and left-libertarian party in Turkey.

== History ==
Logo of the first "Green Left Party"

The first YSP was founded on 25 November 2012 as a merger of the Greens Party and the Equality and Democracy Party. The party changed its name in April 2016. Prominent members include Murat Belge, left-wing political author and former columnist for Taraf; Kutluğ Ataman, filmmaker and contemporary artist; and Ufuk Uras, former Istanbul deputy and president of the Freedom and Solidarity Party (ÖDP).

The party is one of the participants in the Peoples' Democratic Congress (HDK), a political initiative instrumental in founding the Peoples' Democratic Party (HDP) in 2012.

Their chairpersons were temporarily arrested in February 2018 but released with a travel ban for the exterior and under monitoring of the police. They were charged over social media activity and books in their possession.

In the 2023 parliamentary election, members of the HDK most famously the HDP ran on the YSP list because of the threat of a ban. YSP was transformed into the Peoples' Equality and Democracy Party on 15 October 2023 and a new YSP was founded in November of the same year.

== Political positions ==
The party supports decentralization and advocates for significantly shifting central powers to local governments. Ufuk Uras identifies as a left libertarian. In 2015 he said:

The libertarian left is different from the traditional left because of its principles. These are: going in and out of power through elections, respect for different identities and beliefs, socially libertarian, egalitarian, eco-minded, participatory and for the restoration of justice. We would like the HDP to have such a profile. What we are trying to do is to adopt the Syriza experience in Greece to the HDP in Turkey.

The party has formally acknowledged the Armenian genocide.
