= 2018 Turkish Parliament Speaker election =

2018 Turkish Parliament Speaker elections
- 12 July 2018

597 of 600 Members of Parliament voting in the Grand National Assembly 400 votes needed to win in the first two rounds 301 votes needed to win in the third round
- Turnout: 584 of 600 (97.33%)
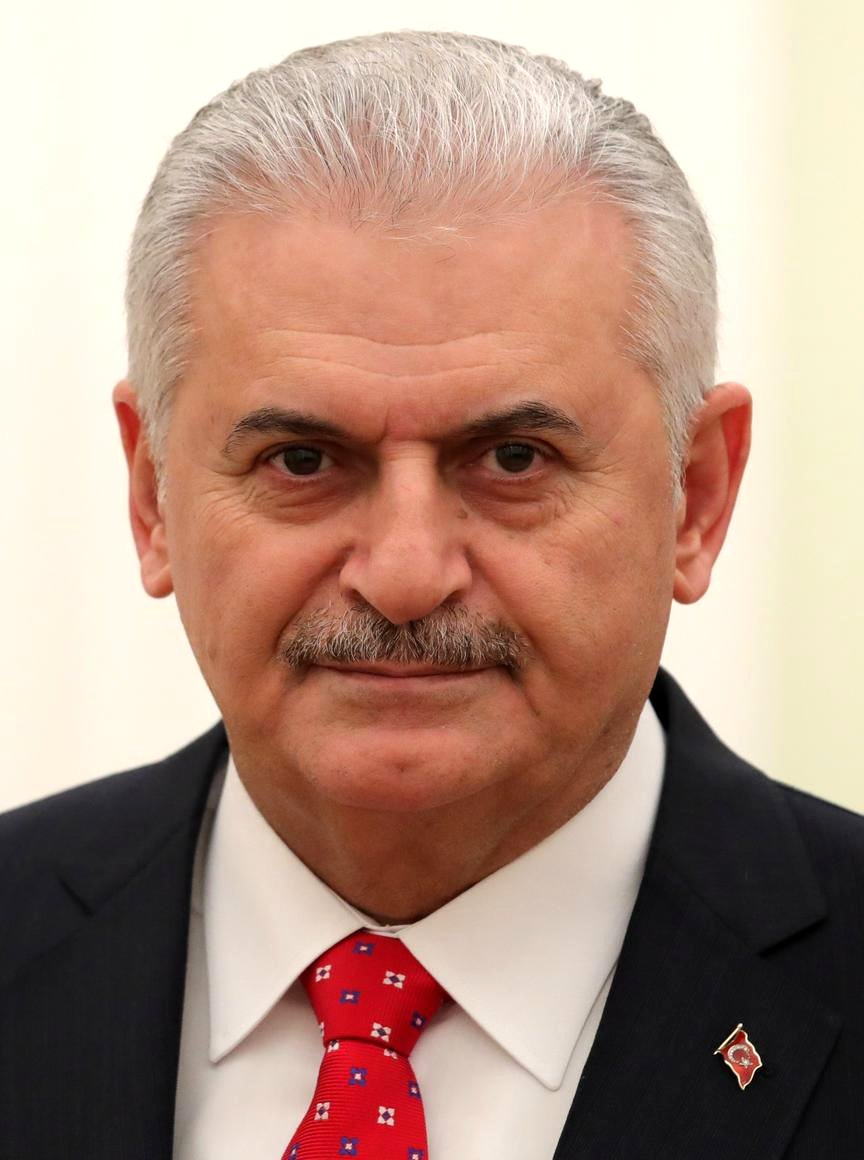

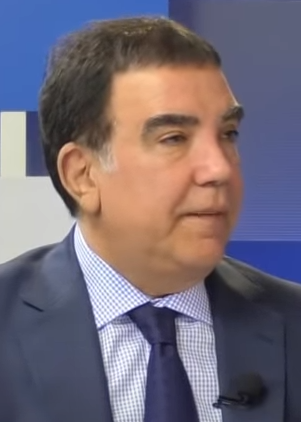

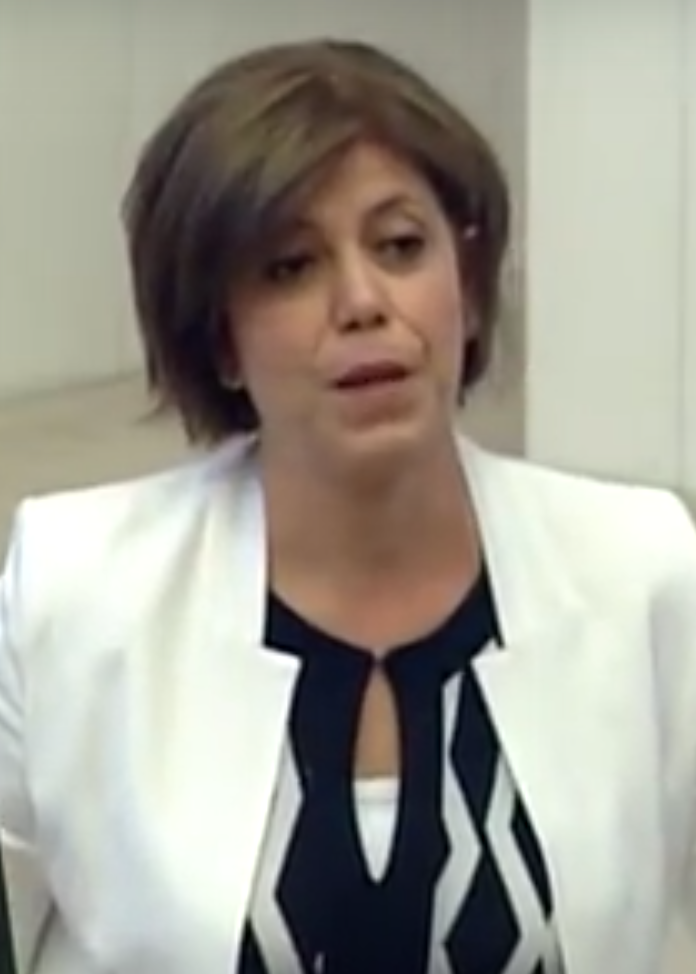

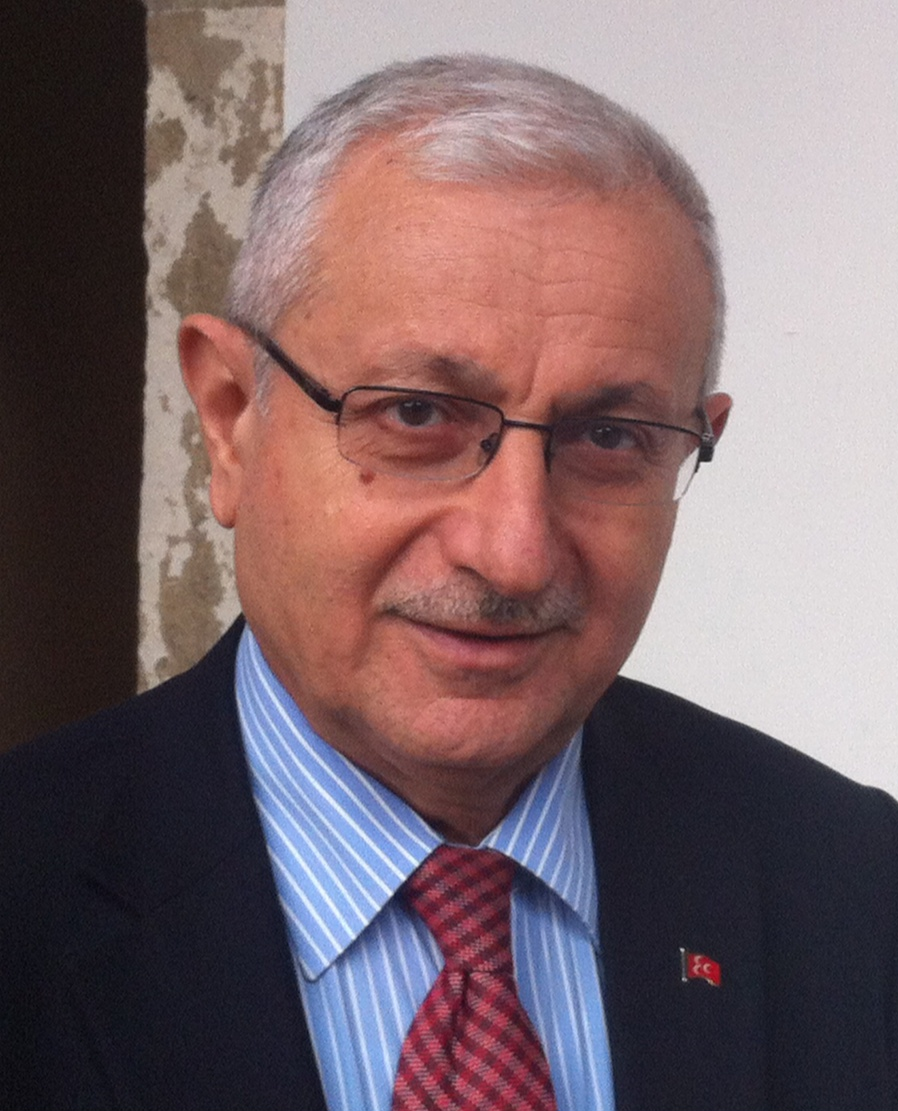
Nominee	Binali Yıldırım	Erdoğan Toprak	Meral Danış Beştaş
Party	AK Party	CHP	HDP
Constituency	İzmir (I)	İstanbul (III)	Adana
Final round	335	135	63
Percentage	57.36%	23.12%	10.79%
Nominee	Hayrettin Nuhoğlu	Cihangir İslam
Party	İYİ	Felicity
Constituency	İstanbul (I)	İstanbul (III)
Final round	40	5
Percentage	6.85%	0.86%
Speaker before election
İsmail Kahraman
AK Party
Elected Speaker
Binali Yıldırım
AK Party

The Turkish Parliament Speaker election of 2018 took place on 12 July 2018 to elect the 28th Speaker of the Grand National Assembly, who will serve for the first three years of the 27th Parliament of Turkey. With 7 parties represented in the 27th Parliament, the speaker was expected to be elected in the third round, as no party or electoral bloc had the necessary two-thirds majority to elect their candidate outright.

The Justice and Development Party (AKP) candidate Binali Yıldırım was elected in the third round with support from the Nationalist Movement Party, winning 335 votes.

== Procedure ==
=== Electoral conduct ===
Following the official opening of Parliament, the oldest Member of Parliament presides over the swearing-in session and the speaker election as acting speaker. For the 27th Parliament, the oldest Member of Parliament was Deniz Baykal, of the electoral district of Antalya. However, due to Baykal's ill health, the position passed onto the next oldest member, İYİ Party MP Durmuş Yılmaz (age 71).

=== Electoral system ===
The Speaker of the Grand National Assembly is elected in a maximum of four rounds. In the first two rounds, a two-thirds majority is sought for outright election, requiring at least 400 out of the possible 600 votes. In the third round, a simple majority is necessary for election, requiring the votes of at least 301 MPs. If no candidate wins a simple majority, often the case when there is a hung parliament, a final round is held where all but the two candidates with the highest votes in the third round are eliminated. The remaining two candidates participate in a run-off, with the candidate winning the most votes being elected.

=== Term length ===
At the start of the five-year parliament, the speaker is elected for a three-year term. A second election will be held in 2021 to determine the speaker for the remaining two years.

== Candidates ==
The Justice and Development Party (AKP) announced former Prime Minister Binali Yıldırım as their candidate on 7 July. The Nationalist Movement Party (MHP), which is part of the People's Alliance with the AKP, announced that it would support the AKP's candidate. The MHP has 49 MPs in parliament, which would allow the AKP's candidate to be elected in the third round.

The main opposition Republican People's Party (CHP) announced Erdoğan Toprak, of İstanbul's third electoral district, as their candidate on 11 July.

The Peoples' Democratic Party (HDP) announced Meral Danış Beştaş, of the electoral district of Adana as their candidate.

The İYİ Party candidate was initially speculated to be Durmuş Yılmaz, the serving acting speaker, but was later announced officially as Hayrettin Nuhoğlu of İstanbul's third electoral district on 11 July.

Out of the two Felicity Party candidates that were elected through the CHP's lists, Cihangir İslam also put forward his candidacy.

== Results ==
Party	Candidate	Party MPs	12 July 2018		
Party	Candidate	Party MPs	Round 1 400 votes to win	Round 2 400 votes to win	Round 3 301 votes to win
AKP	Binali Yıldırım	290	331	336	✓ 335
MHP	Binali Yıldırım	49	331	336	✓ 335
CHP	Erdoğan Toprak	144	134	131	135
HDP	Meral Danış Beştaş	67	65	65	63
İYİ	Hayrettin Nuhoğlu	42	43	42	40
Felicity	Cihangir İslam	2	4	4	5
Invalid / blank			4	6	6
Turnout			581	584	584
Result			Inconclusive	Inconclusive	Yıldırım elected
Source: Anatolia Agency
