= Cihangir İslam =

Turkish physician and politician

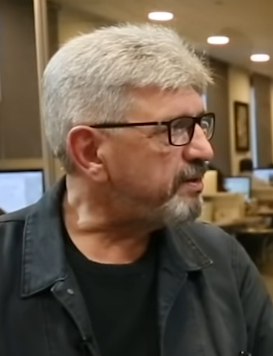

Member of the Grand National Assembly
- In office 24 June 2018 – 14 May 2023
- Constituency: İstanbul (III) (2018)

Personal details
- Born: 6 February 1959 (age 67) Sakarya, Turkey
- Party: Republican People's Party (2021–present)
- Other political affiliations: People's Voice Party (2010–12); Felicity Party (2018–20)
- Education: Ankara University Medical School
- Occupation: Physician, politician

Nazır Cihangir İslam (born 6 February 1959, Sakarya, Turkey) is a Turkish physician and politician.

== Life ==
He was born in 1959 in Sakarya. His father was Nadir Latif Islam, a lawyer-politician from a Bosnian immigrant family, and his mother was Mrs. Seval from a family from the Çal district of Denizli. He was the second of the family's four children. He completed his primary school in Sakarya, middle and high school at TED Ankara College and his undergraduate education at Ankara University Medical School. He completed his specialty training in orthopedics and traumatology at the same university.

He trained in spine surgery and clinical research at the University of Minnesota in the US, McGill University in Canada, and then at the Twin Cities Spine Center in Minnesota, USA.

In 1991, he was among the founders of Mazlumder. Between 1997 and 1998, he was the president of the Van-Hakkari Medical Chamber. He worked as a faculty member in the department of orthopedics and traumatology at Yüzüncü Yıl University and Kafkas University.

Cihangir Islam, who has been interested in politics since his youth, was one of the founding members of the Felicity Party and the People's Voice Party, and took part in organizations such as the Justice Ground Platform (2014) and the Rights and Justice Platform (2017).

During his tenure at Kafkas University, he signed the second Academics for Peace declaration of 18 January 2016, also known as the declaration with 611 signatures, and was dismissed from Kafkas University in February 2017 with the decree law number 686.

He continued his career as a doctor at Haydarpaşa Numune Hospital as the chief of Orthopedics and Traumatology clinic.

In the 2018 general elections in Turkey, he ran as a Republican People's Party (CHP) Istanbul deputy as part of an electoral alliance and entered parliament. After entering parliament, he first switched to the Felicity Party; in 2020, he resigned from the Felicity Party and became an independent MP; and on 9 March 2021, he joined the CHP.

=== Political career ===
He was one of the founding members of the Felicity Party, which was founded in 2001, and the People's Voice Party, which was founded in 2010 with members who left the Felicity Party and dissolved in 2012 after merging with the Justice and Development Party.

In 2014, he took part in the Justice Ground Platform, and in 2017 he took part in the Rights and Justice Platform, which brought together writers and politicians from the Islamic community. He participated in the Justice March launched by CHP chairman Kemal Kılıçdaroğlu on 15 June 2017, and acted as Kılıçdaroğlu's doctor during the march.

In the 2018 general elections in Turkey, he ran for the 9th place on the CHP's Istanbul 3rd District MP list from the Felicity Party quota within the framework of the Millet Alliance and entered the parliament as a CHP Istanbul MP. On 7 July 2018, he switched to the Felicity Party. He was the candidate of the Felicity Party in the election for the Parliament Speaker of the Grand National Assembly of Turkey for the 27th term; he received 3 votes in the first round, 4 votes in the second round and 5 votes in the third round.

On 4 March 2020, he resigned from Felicity Party and became an independent MP. On 9 March 2021, he joined CHP.

In parliament, he served in the TBMM EU Harmonization Commission and the TBMM Research Commission on Elderly Problems.
