= İdris Güllüce =

Turkish politician (born 1950)

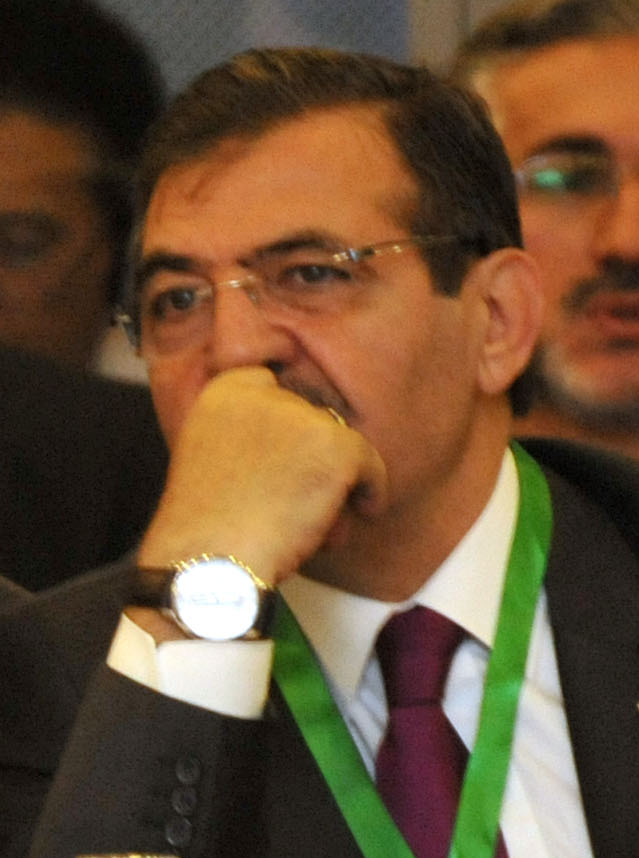
- İdris Güllüce (2015)

Minister of Environment and Urban Planning
- In office 25 December 2013 – 17 November 2015
- Prime Minister: Recep Tayyip Erdoğan; Ahmet Davutoğlu
- Preceded by: Erdoğan Bayraktar
- Succeeded by: Fatma Güldemet Sarı

Member of the Grand National Assembly
- In office 22 July 2007 – 1 November 2015
- Constituency: İstanbul (I) (2007, 2011, June 2015)

Personal details
- Born: February 11, 1950 (age 76) Hasankale, Erzurum Province, Turkey
- Party: Justice and Development Party (AKP)
- Children: 5
- Education: Yıldız Technical University; Gebze Institute of Technology
- Profession: Politician, civil engineer
- Cabinet: 61st, 62nd, 63rd

İdris Güllüce (born 11 February 1950) is a Turkish civil engineer and politician who served as the Minister of Environment and Urban Planning of Turkey between 2013 and 2015. As a member of the Justice and Development Party (AKP), he served as a Member of Parliament for İstanbul's first electoral district between 2007 and November 2015.

== Early life ==
İdris Güllüce was born to Hüseyin Güllüce and his wife Sıddıka in Hasankale (today Pasinler) of Erzurum Province on 11 February 1950.

He was educated in civil engineering at Yıldız Technical University in Istanbul and went on to study Organization Management at Gebze Institute of Technology earning a Master's degree.

Güllüce is married and has five children.

== Career ==
=== Profession ===
After working as an engineer and manager at construction sites in Libya, Güllüce became business partner of a company, and served there as managing director.

=== Politics ===
He entered politics at regional level. Güllüce was elected Mayor of Tuzla municipality in Istanbul serving three legislative terms. Güllüce was member of the city council in Üsküdar and deputy chairman of the Istanbul Metropolitan city council. He published a book entitled "Problems of Regional Governments and Their Solutions".

Güllüce was elected into the Grand National Assembly of Turkey in the 2007 general election as an MP from Istanbul Province. He was re-elected a second time into the parliament in the 2011 general election. Between 2009 and 2013, he served as the chairman of the parliamentary Public Works, Transportation and Tourism Commission.

On 26 December 2013, İdris Güllüce assumed office as Minister of Environment and Urban Planning, succeeding Erdoğan Bayraktar during Erdoğan's cabinet reshuffle with ten new names announced the day before, on 25 December, following the 2013 corruption scandal in Turkey.

== Legacy ==
A cultural complex opened in 2005 and featuring a theatre capable of 460 spectators, the Tuzla İdris Güllüce Cultural Center, is named in his honor.

Political offices
Preceded by Erdoğan Bayraktar	Minister of Environment and Urban Planning; 26 December 2013 - 17 November 2015	Succeeded by Fatma Güldemet Sarı
