= İlhan Kesici =

Turkish politician (born 1948)

İlhan Kesici MP
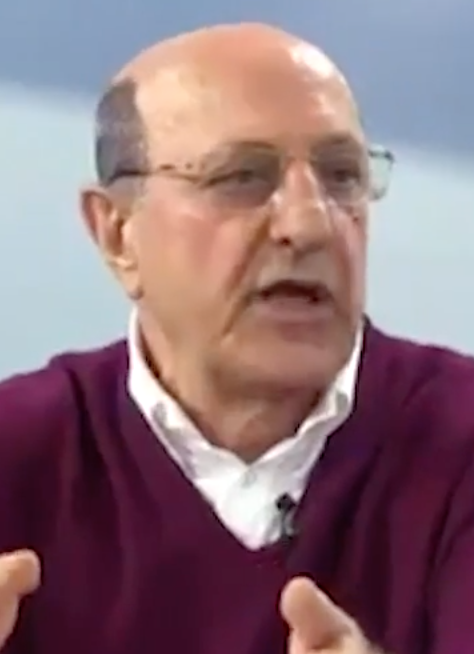

Member of the Grand National Assembly
- Incumbent
- Assumed office 7 June 2015
- Constituency: Istanbul (I) (June 2015, Nov 2015, 2018); Istanbul (III) (2023)
- In office 22 July 2007 – 12 June 2011
- Constituency: Istanbul (I) (2007)
- In office 24 December 1995 – 18 April 1999
- Constituency: Bursa (1995)

Personal details
- Born: 22 November 1948 (age 77) Zara, Turkey
- Party: Motherland Party (ANAP) (1994–99); True Path Party (2002); Republican People's Party (CHP) (2007–10, 2015–present); Independent (2010–15)
- Education: Middle East Technical University; Bradford University
- Occupation: Civil servant, politician
- Website: Official website

İlhan Kesici (born 22 November 1948) is a Turkish politician from the Republican People's Party (CHP), who has served as the Member of Parliament for Istanbul's first electoral district since 2015. He previously served as a CHP MP for the same district from 2007 to 2011 and as an MP for Bursa from 1995 to 1999 while he was a member of the Motherland Party (ANAP). In August 2015, he was offered a ministerial position in the interim election government formed by Prime Minister Ahmet Davutoğlu, which he turned down.

== Early life and career ==
İlhan Kesici was born on 22 November 1948 in Zara, Sivas Province and graduated from Middle East Technical University Faculty of Industrial Engineering. He obtained a master's degree from the same university. He later studied at the University of Bradford Project Planning Centre in the United Kingdom, where he focused on development and infrastructure projects. He also studied high public management at the Royal Institute of Public Administration (RIPA).

=== Employment ===
Kesici began work at the Turkish State Railways (TCDD) Research, Planning and Coordination Department, as a chief project engineer in 1972. He became the deputy manager of the Research, Planning and Coordination Department in 1977. In 1979, he joined the state planning organisation in the Prime Ministry of Turkey and worked as an expert in the Transport and Communications Sector. He became the manager of the state planning organisation in 1981 and became general director in 1984. In 1985, he became the Deputy Permanent Representative of Turkey to the European Community in Brussels. In 1987, he returned to the state planning organisation to become an advisor to the organisation undersecretary, later becoming the undersecretary in 1991. He was appointed as a member of the Council of Higher Education (YÖK) in the same year.

== Political career ==
=== 1994–1999 ===
Kesici became the Motherland Party (ANAP) candidate for the Mayor of Istanbul in the 1994 local elections, losing narrowly to Recep Tayyip Erdoğan from the Welfare Party (RP). He became a Member of Parliament for the electoral district of Bursa in the 1995 general election. As an MP, he was a member of the Foreign Relations Commission, a member of the Turkish delegation to the NATO Parliamentary Assembly and a member of the Turkey-EU Joint Parliamentary Committee.

He ran as the True Path Party's candidate for party leadership against Mehmet Ağar in 2002.

=== 2007–present ===
On 22 May 2007, Kesici became a member of the Republican People's Party (CHP) and was elected as an MP for Istanbul's first electoral district in the 2007 general election. He was again a member of the Foreign Relations Commission and the NATO Parliamentary Assembly. He resigned from the CHP on 28 September 2010 and subsequently stood down at the end of the Parliament in 2011. He rejoined the CHP before the June 2015 general election, in which he was again elected as an MP for Istanbul's first electoral district. He was again appointed as a member of the NATO Parliamentary Assembly.

Kesici was one of the five CHP politicians who were offered ministerial positions by Justice and Development Party leader Ahmet Davutoğlu in August 2015. Davutoğlu had been tasked by President Recep Tayyip Erdoğan to form an interim election government after coalition negotiations proved unsuccessful and resulted in Erdoğan calling an early election. Since the CHP had 131 MPs during the formation of the interim government, the party was entitled to 5 ministries in the cabinet, though Kılıçdaroğlu announced that the CHP would not take part and give up their five ministries to independent politicians. Kesici subsequently declined Davutoğlu's offer, as did the four other CHP MPs that had been offered ministerial positions.

Kesici was reelected as CHP MP for Istanbul's first electoral district in the 2018 general election, beginning the 27th term of parliament, during which he contributed to sit on the Turkish delegation to the NATO Parliamentary Assembly. In the 2023 general election, held on May 14, 2024, he was again returned as CHP MP for Istanbul, beginning the 28th parliamentary term.

== See also ==
- List of Turkish civil servants
