= Mahmut Tanal =

Turkish politician (born 1961)

Mahmut Tanal MP
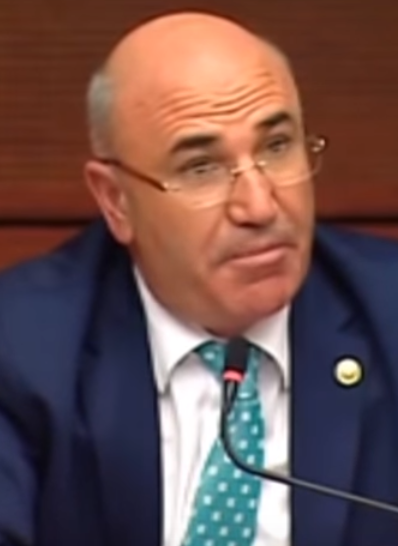

Member of the Grand National Assembly
- Incumbent
- Assumed office 12 June 2011
- Constituency: Istanbul (I) (2011, 2015, Nov 2015, 2018); Şanlıurfa (2023)

Personal details
- Born: 1 January 1961 (age 65) Bahçecik village of Hilvan, Şanlıurfa, Turkey
- Party: New Party (since 2026); Republican People's Party (2011–2026)
- Children: 2
- Education: Istanbul University
- Profession: Lawyer
- Website: Official Website

Mahmut Tanal (born 1 January 1961) is a Turkish politician and former lawyer who serves as a Member of Parliament for Şanlıurfa in the Grand National Assembly, formerly representing Istanbul. He is a member of the Republican People's Party (CHP).

== Background ==
Tanal was born in the Bahçecik village, in Hilvan, Şanlıurfa in 1961 to a Kurdish family. His father was a shepherd who traded livestock. Tanal lived in poverty throughout his early life. He studied in the Istanbul University law faculty between 1982 and 1986. Between 2005 and 2006, he participated in the political school in Bahçeşehir University, and again in 2009 at Okan University. Between 2006 and 2008, and later between 2010 and 2012, he was a delegate from the Bar of İstanbul to the Turkish Bars Association. He serves as a freelance lawyer.

He is married and has two children.

== Politics ==
He was elected as a Member of Parliament from İstanbul in the 2011 Turkish general election from the Republican People's Party.

During the Labour Day protests in Taksim Square on 1 May 2014, Tanal was reported to have sat down in front of a police vehicle in order to stop it from reaching the protestors. Daily Sabah reports that he was injured in a fight with the police who were trying to remove him.

On 9 July 2014, Tanal presented the CHP's objection to Recep Tayyip Erdoğan remaining as Prime Minister while also standing as a presidential candidate in the 2014 presidential election to the Supreme Electoral Council of Turkey. In a press statement, he also attributed the objection to the alleged incompatibility of Erdoğan's ideological and political history with the office of the Presidency, and referred to the judicial decision in 2008 to curb Erdoğan's AK Party state funding due to "violations of democratic and secular principles" as "applying not to a party, but to a person" in this case.

In the 2023 Turkish parliamentary election he was elected in Şanlıurfa.

During the 2025 Turkish protests, he became one of the leading figures in the Turkish opposition.
