= Rümeysa Kadak =

Member of the Turkish parliament

Rümeysa Kadak MP

Member of the Grand National Assembly
- Incumbent
- Assumed office 7 July 2018
- Constituency: Istanbul (III) (2018, 2023)

Personal details
- Born: 16 May 1996 (age 29) Istanbul, Turkey
- Party: Justice and Development Party

Rümeysa Kadak (born 16 May 1996) is a Turkish politician and a member of the Grand National Assembly of Turkey. Elected in 2018, she represents Istanbul, the largest city in Turkey, in the Turkish Parliament. Kadak is the youngest MP in Turkey.

== Education ==
Kadak received her bachelor's degree from the English Language Teaching Department of Marmara University.

== NGO ==
In 2014, Kadak joined the Meridyen Association (Turkish: Meridyen Derneği), where she became the head of the youth branch and ran a debate platform. As she continued her work at Meridyen Derneği, she also volunteered at GEA Search and Rescue Association helping the emergency efforts on the ground and made handmade education materials for the disabled. "Organized Madness" is another civil effort she became part of in 2016 where she started her activism career. In college she was elected as the Vice President of the Student Council.

== Professional career ==
During her college years, she worked in the media sector: TRT World and Daily Sabah. She later taught English at Çamlıca İmam Hatip High School and Çamlıca private primary school.

== Political career ==
In 2017, she became the youngest member of AK Party's (Justice and Development Party) executive board.

After the Turkish constitutional referendum that enabled people between age 18 and 25 to be member of parliament in Turkey, Kadak became the first and youngest official politician in Turkey with her enrollment to politics as an executive member of AK Party, the ruling party in Turkey.

In late 2017, she was appointed the vice-president of AK Party's Civil Society and Public Relations branch.

In the parliamentary election held in June 2018, Kadak was elected as the Deputy for Istanbul. She became the youngest-ever deputy in Turkey. She has a seat in the Presidential Council of the Grand National Assembly of Turkey as the Clerk Member.
