= Gebze Technical University =

Public university in Gebze, Kocaeli, Turkey

Coordinates: 40°48′29″N 29°21′24″E

- Gebze Teknik Üniversitesi
- Former name: Gebze Institute of Technology
- Motto: Turkish: Bir ihtisas üniversitesi
- Motto in English: Excellence in research & education
- Type: Public technical university
- Established: July 11, 1992; 34 years ago
- Rector: Hacı Ali Mantar
- Faculty: 783
- Undergraduates: 7535
- Postgraduates: 2719
- Location: Cumhuriyet, 2254. Sk. No:2, 41400, Gebze, Kocaeli
- Colors: Navy blue, yellow and red
- Mascot: Butterfly
- Website: www.gtu.edu.tr

University rankings

Global – Overall
- CWUR World: 1975 (2025)
- CWTS World: 1398 (2024)
- QS World: 1001-1200 (2026)
- RUR World: 744 (2025)
- THE World: 1201-1500 (2025)
- THE Young Universities: 401-500 (2024)
- USNWR Global: 1550 (2025)
- UIGreenMetric Global: 578 (2024)
- Scimago Global: 5464 (2025)
- URAP World: 1529 (2024)

Global – Life sciences and medicine
- THE Life Sciences: 601-800 (2025)

Global – Science and engineering
- QS Chemistry: 501-550 (2026)
- THE Computer Science: 801-1000 (2025)
- THE Engineering: 1001-1250 (2025)
- THE Physical Sciences: 1001+ (2025)

Regional – Overall
- CWTS Asia: 636 (2024)
- THE Asia: 401-500 (2024)
- THE Emerging Economies: 401-500 (2022)
- USNWR Asia: 584 (2025)

National – Science and engineering
- USNWR Engineering: 896 (2025)

Gebze Technical University (Turkish: Gebze Teknik Üniversitesi (GTÜ)), formerly known as Gebze Institute of Technology (GIT), is one of two institutes of technology in Turkey, the other being İzmir Institute of Technology. Located in Gebze, one of the most industrialized regions of the Marmara Region, the university focuses on undergraduate and graduate studies as well as research activities.

Gebze Technical University holds the designation of "research university" a title awarded by the Council of Higher Education in recognition of its academic output and contributions to research and development.

== History ==
Gebze Technical University was originally founded in 1992 as Gebze Institute of Technology (GIT). It was officially restructured and renamed Gebze Technical University on November 4, 2014, by a decree of the Grand National Assembly of Turkey. GTU builds upon the 22-year legacy and experience of GIT, continuing its mission in higher education and research.

Although a relatively new institution, Gebze Technical University (GTU) has ranked 15th among all universities in Turkey and 5th among universities without a faculty of medicine.

The institute initially began offering graduate-level education in 1994 through four faculties. In 2001, it expanded to include undergraduate programs in the departments of Physics, Mathematics, Materials Science and Engineering, Computer Engineering, and Electronics Engineering. Since then, Gebze Technical University has continued to grow, adding new institutes, faculties, and departments. The most recent addition is the Department of Aeronautical Engineering, established in 2021. All academic programs are supported by 30% English-medium instruction.

== Campus ==
Gebze Technical University operates on a single campus, the Çayırova Campus. Located 10 kilometers from the Gebze city center toward Istanbul, the campus spans an area of 1,400,000 m². The Çayırova Campus houses the rector's office, administrative bodies, the library, and facilities for all undergraduate and select graduate programs. As of 2024, the Çayırova Campus consists of 65 buildings.

The campus is notably divided into two distinct areas with differing climates. The northern side, referred to as the "forest side" by students, is characterized by its dense tree cover and cooler environment. In contrast, the southern side, known as the "desert side," is drier and lacks significant vegetation. The Marmaray Gebze Teknik Üniversitesi train station is situated between these two areas, providing convenient access for commuters.

The main entrance to the campus is located on the northern side, approximately 500 meters from a bus stop that facilitates transportation within Kocaeli. The bus stop also serves as the entry point to the Marmaray train station, further enhancing the connectivity of the university to surrounding regions.

== Organisation ==
- Institutes: Energy Technologies Institute, Institute of Biology, Institute of Nanotechnology, Institute of Earth and Marine Sciences, Institute of Information Technologies
- Faculty of Science: Physics, Chemistry, Mathematics, Molecular Biology and Genetics
- Faculty of Engineering: Computer Engineering, Bioengineering, Environmental Engineering, Electronics Engineering, Industrial Engineering, Civil Engineering, Geomatics Engineering, Chemical Engineering, Mechanical Engineering, Materials Science and Engineering
- Faculty of Architecture: Architecture, City and Regional Planning, Industrial Design
- Faculty of Aerospace Engineering: Aeronautical Engineering
- Faculty of Business Administration: Department of Economics, Department of Management, Science of Strategy, Management Information Systems
- Cyber Security Vocational School: Cyber Security Analyst and Operator
- Departments Under Rectorate: Physical Education and Sports, Turkish Language Preparatory Department, Foreign Languages

== Facilities ==
=== Library ===
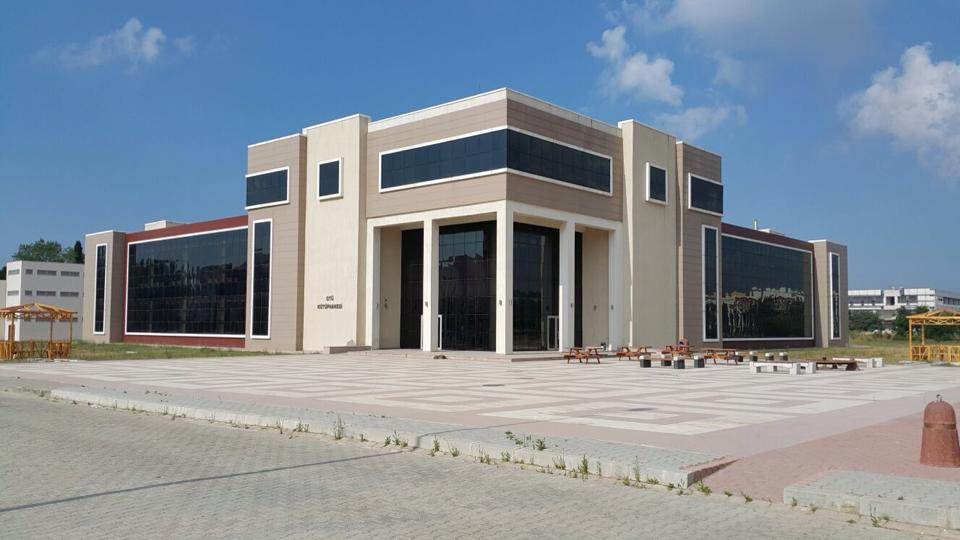
An outdoor view of the Prof. Dr. Nejat Göyünç Library

The GTU Library, officially named the Prof. Dr. Nejat Göyünç Library, is a three-floor facility located on the southern side of the Çayırova Campus. Covering an area of 4,177 square meters, the library has the capacity to accommodate 560 visitors. The library holds a collection of over 20,000 books and more than 6,000 published theses. It also provides access to over 300,000 eBooks, more than 75,000 electronic publications, and over 60 external databases. These extensive resources make the library an essential academic center for supporting the research and learning needs of the university community.

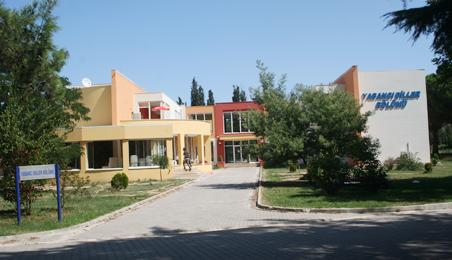
GTU The Foreign Languages Building

=== Laboratories ===
GTU includes over 100 research and teaching laboratories located on both the northern and southern sides of its campus. Each major department is equipped with its own computer network and laboratories for student use. Public computer laboratories are also available on weekdays and weekends.

=== Dining Halls ===
Gebze Technical University (GTU) provides two student dining halls and a personnel dining hall on campus. While the personnel dining hall is primarily intended for university staff, students are also permitted to dine there. One student dining hall is situated behind the Architecture Department building on the northern side of the campus. The second student dining hall is located on the -1st floor of the Environmental Engineering and Chemistry building on the southern side of the campus. The personnel dining hall is positioned behind the Student Affairs building, near the Rectorate building, on the northern side of the campus. As of the 2024–2025 academic year, the cost of a dining hall meal for undergraduate students is set at 25 Turkish Lira.

=== Sports Complex ===
The GTU Sports Complex, officially known as the Ahmet Ayhan Closed Sports Hall, is situated near the Chemical Engineering building on the southern side of the campus. The complex hosts basketball and volleyball games, as well as robotic events. Additionally, it features a fitness area for personal exercise in which the cost to use it per seance is between 67,50-250 Turkish Lira.

=== GTU Congress and Culture Center ===
The GTU Congress and Culture Center, commonly referred to as the Congress Center, officially opened on February 2, 2020. The facility serves as a venue for various events, including conferences, seminars, concerts, international meetings, and academic ceremonies such as the opening of the new academic year. It is located at the northernmost part of the campus, north of the Material Science and Engineering and Mechanical Engineering buildings, and near the D.100 state road.

=== Kelebek Cafe & Restaurant ===
Kelebek Cafe & Restaurant, located on the northern side of the campus, is considered one of the most crowded and social spots at Gebze Technical University. The establishment is situated directly across from the Architecture Department building and is connected to the left side of the Foreign Languages building. Sponsored by the university but privately operated, the cafe and restaurant offer a wide selection of food and beverages. Prices vary and are subject to fluctuation.

=== GTU Stationary & Copy Center ===
The GTU Stationery & Copy Center, commonly referred to as the Copy Center or Photocopy Center, is a university-sponsored private shop located to the left of Kelebek Cafe & Restaurant. The center provides a range of products and services tailored to the needs of students and faculty, including printing services, as well as stationery items such as pencils, pens, paper, erasers, and sharpeners. Prices are variable and may fluctuate over time.

=== Half Olympic Closed Swimming Pool ===
The GTU Half Olympic Closed Swimming Pool, commonly referred to as the Closed Swimming Pool, is an indoor swimming facility that opened on September 15, 2017. It is located adjacent to the right of the GTU Sports Complex on the southern side of the campus. As of the 2024–2025 academic year, the cost to use the swimming pool per seance is between 67,50-300 Turkish Lira per person.

=== Sport Courts ===
Gebze Technical University offers multiple basketball, volleyball, soccer, and tennis courts, all located on the northern side of the campus. As of the 2024–2025 academic year, the cost to use these courts per hour is 66 Turkish Lira per person for students and personnel, and 80 Turkish Lira per person for guest students.

=== Antik Cafe ===
Antik Cafe, located on the northern side of the campus, is a cafe situated directly behind the Foreign Languages building and surrounds an artificially built lake. The cafe opened on November 6, 2023. Jointly operated by the university and Kocaeli Metropolitan Municipality, the cafe offers a limited selection of food and beverages. Prices vary and are subject to fluctuation.

=== Hünkar Mosque ===
Hünkar Mosque, located on the northern side of the campus, is a mosque situated across the personnel dining hall.

=== Minik Çınar Preschool ===
Minik Çınar Preschool, located on the northern side of campus and situated northeast of the rectorate building, is a private preschool operated by the university. As of the 2024-2025 academic year, the cost for a child to study at the preschool is between 150,000 and 250,000 Turkish Lira depending on whether you're a staff member working at the university as well as your payment method.

=== BİM Supermarket ===
BİM, located on the southern side of campus and situated directly across of the library is a supermarket opened in late 2024, within campus borders, operated by BİM Birleşik Mağazalar A.Ş. It's worth noting that this supermarket should not be mistaken for another BİM supermarket located outside of the northern campus near the Marmaray train station and that the pricing is the same as all other BİM supermarkets.

=== GTÜ Genç Butik ===
GTÜ Genç Butik, or Genç Butik for short, located on the northern side of campus and situated besides the personnel dining hall, is a boutique opened in 2015 and jointly operated by Türk Kızılayı and the university. The boutique has over 14,000 pieces of clothing for students to try on and purchase for free.

=== Research and Development Greenhouse ===
The Research and Development Greenhouse, located on the southern side of campus and situated to the left of the entrance to the southern side of campus, is a greenhouse jointly established by Gübretaş and the GTU Biotechnology Institute in 2019. The greenhouse is designed for research and development of innovative plant nutrition and protection products, including microbial fertilizers and biostimulants. It also focuses on hydroponic farming, plant biotechnology, and functional food research. The facility aims to drive sustainable and competitive agricultural research, supporting both academic and industrial advancements in the field.

=== Female Dormitory ===
The female dormitory, officially named the Nilüfer Hatun KYK Female Student Dormitory, is a double-blocked, three floor facility located on the southern side of campus, situated directly across the chemistry department building. Covering an area of 2,500 square meters, the dormitory has the capacity to accommodate 1,764 female students. There are a total of 296 rooms. Each room has a maximum capacity of 6 students. There are a total of 4 rooms for students with disabilities. There is also a room on the basement floor of each block for students to wash their dirty laundry. The dormitories have warm water running all day long. There are bathrooms, a minifridge and a shoe rack in each dorm. The dormitory additionally offers free internet, breakfast and dinner service. There is also a separate facility for students to socialize in within dormitory grounds.

=== Güzide Campus ===
Güzide Campus, is a private cafe and restaurant serving baked goods and soft drinks, situated directly across of the library on the southern side of campus.

== Campus Life ==
GTU has several active student societies, including:

- Astronomy and Physics Society
- IEEE Student Branch
- IT Club
- Music Society
- Photography and Drawing Society
- Robot Society
- Sport Society
- 1907 UNIFEB GTÜ
- Dance Club
- Nature Sports and Climbing
- GTU Rowing Crew
- UltrAslan GTÜ
- UNIBJK GTÜ
- Theater Club
- International Students Club

== Transportation ==
Gebze Technical University offers multiple transportation options, making it one of the most accessible universities in Turkey. The Marmaray Gebze Teknik Üniversitesi-Fatih train station, named after the university and the place it is in, is located between the two sides of the campus, providing a direct connection to Istanbul and the surrounding areas.

Approximately 500 meters to the left of the university's main entrance, there is a bus stop serving various routes across Kocaeli Province. The buses available include G1, 430, 435MR, 440, 490, 490E, 502, 503, 504, 525, 530, 552, 558, 559, 560, and 700. Notably, routes 490 and 490E provide direct access to the Muallimköy dormitory, which is jointly operated by the university and the Credit and Dormitories Institution. These transportation options make the campus easily reachable for students and staff from both Istanbul and Kocaeli.

== Notable alumni ==
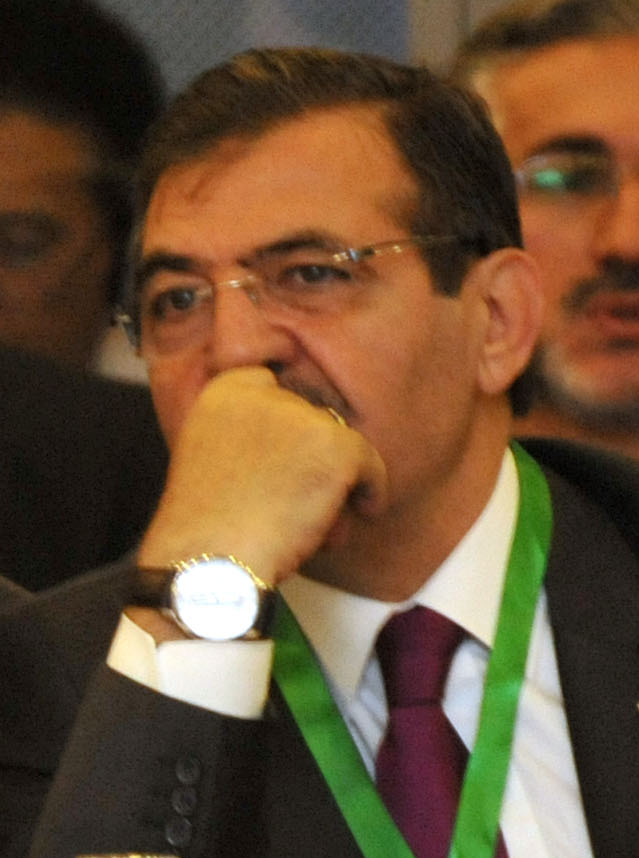
İdris Güllüce

- İdris Güllüce — Turkish civil engineer, politician for the Justice and Development Party (Turkey) and former Minister of Environment, Urbanisation and Climate Change
- Hasan Turan — Turkish politician and former member of the Grand National Assembly of Turkey

== See also ==
- İzmir Institute of Technology
