= Erzurum (electoral district) =

Electoral district for the Grand National Assembly of Turkey

Coordinates: 37°50′N 34°45′E

- electoral district for the Grand National Assembly of Turkey
- Erzurum shown within Turkey
- Province: Erzurum
- Electorate: 510.281

Current electoral district
- Created: 1923
- Seats: 6 Historical: 7 (2002–2007) 8 (1999)
- MPs: List: Selami Altınok AKP Fatma Öncü AKP Mehmet Emi̇n Öz AKP Abdurrahi̇m Fırat AKP Kamil Aydın MHP Meral Danış Beştaş YSP
- Turnout at last election: 86.26%
- Representation
- AK Party: 4 / 6
- MHP: 1 / 6
- Party of Greens and the Left Future: 1 / 6

Erzurum is an electoral district of the Grand National Assembly of Turkey. It elects six members of parliament (deputies) to represent the province of the same name for a four-year term by the D'Hondt method, a party-list proportional representation system.

== Members ==
Population reviews of each electoral district are conducted before each general election, which can lead to certain districts being granted a smaller or greater number of parliamentary seats. Erzurum has been declining in population since 1999 relative to other provinces, resulting in a loss of two seats between 1999 and 2011.

MPs for Erzurum, 1999 onwards
Election	1999 (21st Parliament)	2002 (22nd Parliament)	2007 (23rd Parliament)	2011 (24th Parliament)	June 2015 (25th Parliament)
MP	Zeki Ertugay; DYP	Recep Akdağ; AK Party			Efkan Ala; AK Party
MP	Ayvaz Gökdemir; DYP	Mustafa Nuri Akbulut; AK Party	Muhyettin Aksak; AK Party		Zehra Taşkesenlioğlu; AK Party
MP	Lütfü Esengün; Virtue	Mücahit Daloğlu; AK Party	Saadettin Aydın; AK Party	Adnan Yılmaz; AK Party	
MP	Fahrettin Kukarcı; Virtue	Muzaffer Gülyurt; AK Party		Cengiz Yavilioğlu; AK Party	İbrahim Aydemir; AK Party
MP	Aslan Polat; Virtue	Mustafa Ilıcalı; AK Party	Fazilet Dağcı Çığlık; AK Party		Seher Akçınar Bayar; HDP
MP	Mücahit Himoğlu; MHP	İbrahim Özdoğan; AK Party	İbrahim Kavaz; AK Party	Oktay Öztürk; MHP	Kamil Aydın; MHP
MP	İsmail Köse; MHP	Ömer Özyılmaz; AK Party	Zeki Ertugay; MHP	No seat	
MP	Cezmi Polat; MHP	No seat			

== General elections ==
=== 2011 ===
2011 general election: Erzurum
Party	Candidate	Votes	%	±%
AK Party	5 elected ▼1: 1. Recep Akdağ ✓; 2. Adnan Yılmaz ✓; 3. Fazilet Dağcı Çığlık ✓; 4. Cengiz Yavilioğlu ✓; 5. Muhyettin Aksak ✓; 6. İbrahim Aydemir ✗	283,638	69.22	▲0.93
MHP	1 elected 0: 1. Oktay Öztürk ✓; 2. Kamil Aydın ✗; 3. Ertürk Çimen ✗; 4. Jale Hülya Alcan ✗; 5. Ömer Durdur ✗; 6. Muhsin Yılmaz ✗	54,522	13.31	▲0.17
Independent	None elected: Sebahattin Yılmaz ✗	33,373	8.14	▲2.78
CHP	None elected: 1. Ahmet Hamdi Palandöken ✗; 2. Yaşettin Kışlak ✗; 3. Mehmet Sait Şimşek ✗; 4. Nurhan Banu Üner ✗; 5. İsmail Nardemir ✗; 6. Dursun Murat Çelikoğlu ✗	19,847	4.84	▲0.13
SAADET	None elected: 1. Atik Ağdağ ✗; 2. Hasan Karataş ✗; 3. Faik Çalık ✗; 4. Mehmet Akbulut ✗; 5. İbrahim Sirkecioğlu ✗; 6. Yusuf Doğan ✗	6,576	1.60	▼1.63
Büyük Birlik	None elected: 1. Hüseyin Faruk Şahin ✗; 2. İsmet Yiğit ✗; 3. Ahmet Yıldırım ✗; 4. Ali Kürşat Bilgin ✗; 5. Abamüslim Kalkan ✗; 6. Yener Göztürk ✗	3,612	0.88	▲0.88
HAS Party	None elected: 1. Teoman Kümbet ✗; 2. Kahraman Şimşek ✗; 3. Yusuf Türkmen ✗; 4. Muhammet Yavuz ✗; 5. Selahi Çınarlıoğlu ✗; 6. Muhammet Recai Demirci ✗	3,067	0.75	▲0.75
DP	None elected: 1. Halil Alpaslan Kaya ✗; 2. Nilgün Kolsarıcı ✗; 3. Aziz Karaca ✗; 4. Yetkin Gültekin ✗; 5. Ayşe Aygül Başgelen Atsak ✗; 6. Orhan Turğut ✗	1,739	0.42	▼2.20
DSP	None elected: 1. Cemal Koçak ✗; 2. Dilek Yılmaz ✗; 3. Yüksel Tür ✗; 4. Ali Alagöz ✗; 5. Osman Günay ✗; 6. Ali İşikli ✗	1,310	0.32	N/A
DYP	None elected: 1. Efrullah Hızarcı ✗; 2. Engin Özbey ✗; 3. Dursun Yiğit ✗; 4. Eyüp Olğar ✗; 5. Selami Aral ✗; 6. Reşit Örs ✗	603	0.15	▲0.15
HEPAR	None elected: 1. Zerrin Kütrü ✗; 2. Salih Kıcırgan ✗; 3. Yakup Akar ✗; 4. Nezih Kütrü ✗; 5. Sedakat Başbuğ ✗; 6. Ali Bahadır Zencir ✗	489	0.12	▲0.12
TKP	None elected: 1. Bulut Çiftçi ✗; 2. Behram Aktemur ✗; 3. Zeynep Pekel ✗; 4. Birgül Zöngür ✗; 5. Sultan Zor ✗; 6. Sibel Topaloğlu ✗	430	0.10	▼0.17
Nationalist Conservative	None elected: 1. Burhanettin Baysal ✗; 2. Mahmut Gürler ✗; 3. Muazzez Fide ✗; 4. Nejmi Kurt ✗; 5. İsa Baysal ✗; 6. Ömer Tekin ✗	288	0.07	▲0.07
MP	None elected: 1. Mustafa Ayhan ✗; 2. Mehmet Şeref Ramazanoğlu ✗; 3. Emine Güler ✗; 4. Mürsel Kurt ✗; 5. Sait Ermiş ✗; 6. Zeliha Ekinci ✗	251	0.06	▲0.06
Labour	No candidates	0	0.00	0.00
Liberal Democrat	No candidates	0	0.00	▼0.10
Total votes		409,745	100.00	
Rejected ballots		5,682	1.37	▲0.65
Turnout		414,177	86.01	▲6.41
AK Party hold Majority		229,116	56.09	▲0.94

=== June 2015 ===
Abbr.	Party	Votes	%
AK Party	Justice and Development Party	209,875	52%
MHP	Nationalist Movement Party	94,732	23.5%
HDP	Peoples' Democratic Party	71,742	17.8%
CHP	Republican People's Party	11,078	2.7%
SP	Felicity Party	9,610	2.4%
	Other	6,420	1.6%
Total		403,457	
Turnout		84.96	
source: YSK

=== November 2015 ===
Abbr.	Party	Votes	%
AK Party	Justice and Development Party	275,427	68.1%
MHP	Nationalist Movement Party	57,997	14.3%
HDP	Peoples' Democratic Party	49,172	12.2%
CHP	Republican People's Party	12,065	3%
SP	Felicity Party	3,236	0.8%
	Other	6,692	1.7%
Total		404,589	
Turnout		84.98	
source: YSK

=== 2018 ===
Abbr.	Party	Votes	%
AK Party	Justice and Development Party	227,575	53.8%
MHP	Nationalist Movement Party	78,125	18.5%
HDP	Peoples' Democratic Party	49,885	11.8%
IYI	Good Party	34,644	8.2%
CHP	Republican People's Party	16,790	4%
SP	Felicity Party	7,515	1.8%
	Other	8,283	2%
Total		422,817	
Turnout		87.34	
source: YSK

=== 2023 ===
Abbr.	Party	Votes	%
AK Party	Justice and Development Party	192.248	43.3%
MHP	Nationalist Movement Party	73.952	16.6%
YSP	Party of Greens and the Left Future	43.931	9.9%
IYI	Good Party	42.143	9.5%
CHP	Republican People's Party	31.227	7%
YRP	New Welfare Party	21.822	4.9%
	Other	38.876	8.8%
Total		444.199	
Turnout		86.26%	
source: YSK

== Presidential elections ==
=== 2014 ===
2014 presidential election: Erzurum
Party	Candidate	Votes	%
AK Party	Recep Tayyip Erdoğan	251,039	68.80
Independent	Ekmeleddin İhsanoğlu	66,168	18.13
HDP	Selahattin Demirtaş	47,701	13.07
Total votes		364,908	100.00
Rejected ballots		6,986	1.88
Turnout		371,894	76.33
Recep Tayyip Erdoğan win			
