= Hasan Turan (Turkish politician) =

Turkish politician (born 1967)

Hasan Turan (born 1967, Bulancak) is a Turkish politician.

Hasan Turan graduated from Anadolu University Faculty of Management, and completed his master's degree in Beykent University Department of Administration-Organization and Gebze Technical University Faculty of Management. He engaged in commercial activities in the field of advertising and organisation. He took office as Istanbul Metropolitan Municipality Parliament member and the chairperson of Federation of Non-Governmental Organizations in Giresun. He has been a member of the 26th and 27th Parliament of Turkey, representing Istanbul. He knows English, is married and has two children.
