= Fatma Güldemet Sarı =

Turkish politician (born 1970)

Fatma Güldemet Sarı MP
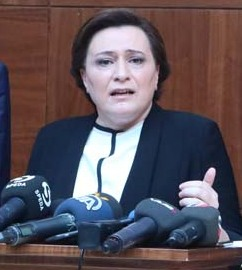

Minister of Environment and Urban Planning
- In office 24 November 2015 – 24 May 2016
- Prime Minister: Ahmet Davutoğlu
- Preceded by: İdris Güllüce
- Succeeded by: Mehmet Özhaseki

Member of the Grand National Assembly
- Incumbent
- Assumed office 7 June 2015
- Constituency: Adana (June 2015, Nov 2015)

Personal details
- Born: June 25, 1970 (age 56) Malatya, Turkey
- Party: Justice and Development Party (AKP)
- Education: Yıldız Technical University
- Occupation: Politician
- Profession: Architect
- Cabinet: 64th
- Website: personal website

Fatma Güldemet Sarı (born 25 June 1970) is a Turkish politician from the Justice and Development Party (AKP), who served as the Minister of Environment and Urban Planning from 24 November 2015 to 24 May 2016. She has been a Member of Parliament for the electoral district of Adana since 7 June 2015.

== Early life and career ==
Born in Malatya, Sarı graduated from Yıldız Technical University as an architect, working in both Adana and Istanbul. She began her political career in 2008 after launching the AKP Çukurova district branch and served in the Adana AKP provincial branch between 2012 and 2014 before being elected as a Member of Parliament in 2015. She can speak fluent English.

== See also ==
- 25th Parliament of Turkey
