= Erdoğan Toprak =

Turkish politician (born 1961)

Erdoğan Toprak MP
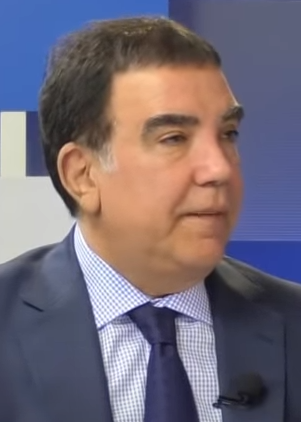

Minister of State responsible for Youth and Sports
- In office 24 August 2002 – 18 November 2002
- Prime Minister: Bülent Ecevit
- Preceded by: Fikret Ünlü
- Succeeded by: Mehmet Ali Şahin

Deputy Leader of the Republican People's Party
- Incumbent
- Assumed office 25 December 2010
- Leader: Kemal Kılıçdaroğlu

Member of the Grand National Assembly
- Incumbent
- Assumed office 12 June 2011
- Constituency: İstanbul (III) (2011, June 2015, Nov 2015, 2018, 2023)
- In office 24 December 1995 – 3 November 2002
- Constituency: İstanbul (III) (1995, 1999)

Personal details
- Born: 10 December 1961 (age 64) Zeytinli, Adana, Turkey
- Party: Republican People's Party (CHP) (2011–present); Democratic Left Party (DSP) (1995–2002)
- Education: Anadolu University
- Occupation: Entrepreneur, politician

Erdoğan Toprak (born 10 December 1961) is a Turkish politician and businessman from the Republican People's Party (CHP), who has served as the Member of Parliament for İstanbul's third electoral district since 2011. Having served as the MP for the same district between 1995 and 2002 as a member of the Democratic Left Party (DSP), he served as the Minister of State responsible for Youth and Sports in the coalition government of Bülent Ecevit, before losing his seat at the 2002 general election. Re-elected as an MP in the 2011 general election and again in June 2015, Toprak currently serves as the Deputy Leader of the CHP since 25 December 2010. He was offered, but declined, a ministerial position by Prime Minister Ahmet Davutoğlu during the formation of an interim election government in August 2015.

== Early life and career ==
Erdoğan Toprak was born in 1961 in the Zeytinli village of Adana. He graduated from Anadolu University Faculty of Social Sciences before beginning his career in 1983 as a freelance businessman. He was a member of the Turkish Young Businessmen Association (TÜGİAD) and was a founding member of the Beşiktaş Young Businessmen Association, for which he served on the Executive Board. He was a member of the Durable Consumption Group Executive Board for the İstanbul Chamber of Commerce.

=== Sports ===
Since 1988, Toprak served as the manager of the Bahçelievler Sports Club for three terms, as the Beşiktaş J.K. gymnastics deputy manager and as the Vice President of Bakırköyspor.

== Politics ==
=== Early parliamentary career ===
Toprak entered active politics in 1992, becoming a Member of Parliament for İstanbul's third electoral district in the 1995 general election. He was re-elected as an MP in the 1999 general election. During his term in Parliament, he served on the Interior Commission and on the presidential council of the State Owned Enterprises (KİT) Commission. He also served as the President of research-investigation commissions and became the President of the Turkey-India Interparliamentary Friendship Group, the Vice President of the Turkey-United Kingdom Interparliamentary Friendship Group and was a member of numerous other friendship groups. He chaired several parliamentary studies into problems faced by the country during the late 1990s. These included works on regional retirement homes, mobile education in the south-east of Turkey as well as an alternative development project for the region.

=== Minister of State ===
On 24 August 2002, Toprak replaced Fikret Ünlü as the Minister of State responsible for Youth and Sports in the coalition government led by DSP leader Bülent Ecevit. He was known for the support he gave to volleyball, basketball, athletics, football, kayaking and boxing. He was also praised for enhancing facilities for disabled athletes. Following his tenure as minister, he was given the 'Sportsman of the Year' award by numerous media corporations. He lost his seat and his government position in the 2002 general election, in which the DSP failed to surpass the 10% election threshold and was left with no representation in Parliament.

=== Republican People's Party ===
Joining the Republican People's Party (CHP), Toprak became the Deputy Leader responsible for publicity, press and propaganda, administrative and financial affairs, in charge of employers' unions and professional associations on 25 December 2010. He was elected as an MP for İstanbul's third electoral district in the 2011 general election and was re-elected in the June 2015 general election. He founded the Business Dialogue and Solidarity Unit (İDDB) in order to maintain strong links between the CHP and the business sector. He was appointed and remains as the chief advisor to the CHP's leader Kemal Kılıçdaroğlu.

Toprak was one of the five CHP politicians who were offered ministerial positions by Justice and Development Party leader Ahmet Davutoğlu in August 2015. Davutoğlu had been tasked by President Recep Tayyip Erdoğan to form an interim election government after coalition negotiations proved unsuccessful and resulted in Erdoğan calling an early election. Since the CHP had 131 MPs during the formation of the interim government, the party was entitled to 5 ministries in the cabinet, though Kılıçdaroğlu announced that the CHP would not take part and give up their five ministries to independent politicians. Toprak subsequently declined Davutoğlu's offer, as did the four other CHP MPs that had been offered ministerial positions.

== See also ==
- 57th government of Turkey
