= Özlem Zengin =

Turkish jurist and politician (born 1969)

Özlem Zengin MP
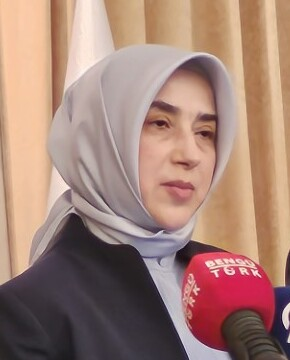

Member of the Grand National Assembly
- Incumbent
- Assumed office 8 July 2018
- Constituency: Tokat (2018); İstanbul (III) (2023)
- In office 7 June 2015 – 1 November 2015
- Constituency: İstanbul (III) (June 2015)

Personal details
- Born: 9 September 1969 (age 57)
- Party: Justice and Development Party
- Education: Istanbul University
- Occupation: Politician

Özlem Zengin (born 9 September 1969) is a Turkish lawyer and politician, who has served as Deputy Chairman of the Justice and Development Party (AK Party) parliamentary group, and as a member of the Grand National Assembly of Turkey.

== Earlu life and education ==
Zengin was born 9 September 1969 in Tokat, the daughter of Salih and Nimet. She graduated from the Faculty of Law at Istanbul University in 1990. She later completed a master's degree at Marmara University's Institute of Social Science in the sociology and religion, with a thesis titled "Sociological Changes in the Perception of Religion and Secularism in Light of Judicial Rulings."

== Career ==
=== Early career and party activity ===
Zengin worked as a self employed lawyer and was active in broadcasting; from 1998-2001 she produced and presented ''Hayatın İçinden'' on the television channel Kanal 7. She was elected to the AK party's Istanbul provincial board in 2003 and served three consecutive terms as the board's deputy head for promotion and media. She was elected head of the AK party's Istanbul women's branches in 2012. a post she held until 2015.

=== Parliament ===
Zegin was first elected to the Grand National Assembly for Istanbul in the June 2015 Turkish general election, but her term ended when the assembly was dissolved ahead of the November 2015 Turkish general election, in which she was not returned.

From 2016-2018 she served as chief advisor to President Recep Tayyip Erdoğan. She returned to parliament in the 2018 Turkish general election as a deputy to for Tokat, and was appointed Deputy Chairman of the AK party parliamentary group that July, serving until March 2021.

She served as AK party Deputy Chairperson (''Genel Başkan Yardımcısı'') from 2021 to 2022. She was reelected for Tokat in the 27th term and again returned to the post of Deputy Group Chairman. In the 2023 Turkish general election Zengin was elected to represent Istanbul rather than Tokat, and has continued to serve as AK party Deputy Group Chairman in the 28th parliamentary term.

== Personal life ==
Zengin speaks English. She has three children.
