= Hilvan =

- District and municipality
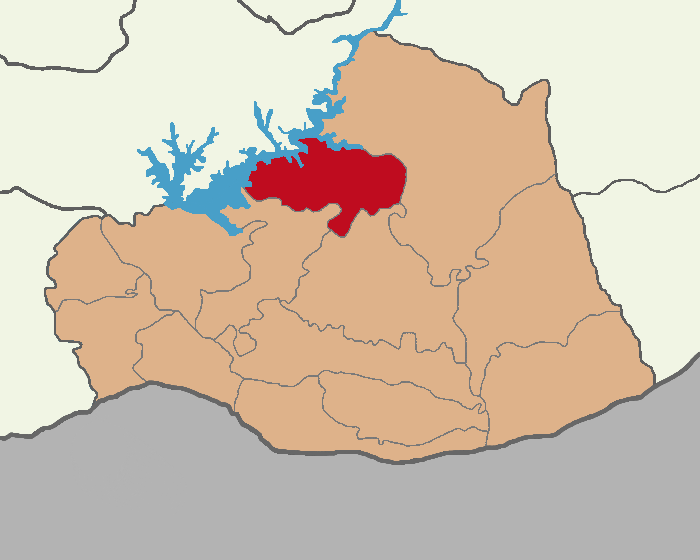
- Map showing Hilvan District in Şanlıurfa Province

- Location in Turkey Hilvan (Şanlıurfa)
- Coordinates: 37°35′19″N 38°57′20″E
- Country: Turkey
- Province: Şanlıurfa

Government
  - Mayor: Serhan Paydaş (Dem Parti)
- Area: 1,111 km^{2} (429 sq mi)
- Population (2022): 42,218
  - Density: 38.00/km^{2} (98.42/sq mi)
- Time zone: UTC+3 (TRT)
- Postal code: 63900
- Area code: 0414
- Website: www.hilvan.bel.tr

Hilvan (Kurdish: Curnê Reş, Ottoman Turkish: قره جورون, romanized: Karacurun) is a municipality and district of Şanlıurfa Province, Turkey. Its area is 1,111 km^{2}, and its population is 42,218 (2022). It is 55 km north from the city of Şanlıurfa.

== Composition ==
There are 71 neighbourhoods in Hilvan District:

- Ağılmus
- Ağveren
- Akçakebir
- Akçaören
- Alpı
- Arabuk
- Arıca
- Arınık
- Arpalı
- Arslanlı
- Aşağıçatak
- Aşağıekece
- Aşağıkamış
- Aşağıkülünçe
- Aydınlı
- Bağlar
- Bahçecik
- Bahçelievler
- Balkı
- Bargaç
- Bölükbaşı
- Buğur
- Çağıllı
- Çakmak
- Çat
- Çimdeli
- Doğrular
- Faik
- Gelenek
- Göktepe
- Gölcük
- Gölebakan
- Gülaldı
- Güluşağı
- Gürgür
- Hanmağara
- Hayrat
- Hoşin
- İncirli
- Kadıkent
- Karaburç
- Karacurun
- Karakucak
- Karapınar
- Kavalık
- Kepirhisar
- Kepirkucak
- Kırbaşı
- Korgun
- Kovancı
- Küçük Gölcük
- Kuskunlu
- Malören
- Mantarlı
- Nasreddin
- Ömerli
- Orgız
- Ovacık
- Oymaağaç
- Özbaş
- Özveren
- Saluca
- Söğütlü
- Sucuhan
- Üçüzler
- Ustahasan
- Uzuncuk
- Yakınyurt
- Yeni
- Yeşerdi
- Yuvacalı

== Notable people ==
- Mustafa Kılıç (1925-2004), politician
- Kenan Nuri Nehrozoğlu (1934-2021), politician
- Celal Paydaş (1940-1988), judge and politician
- Mahmut Tanal (born 1961), politician
- Nihat Şındak (born 1968), academic
- Bülent İnal (born 1973), actor
