= Meral Danış Beştaş =

Turkish politician (born 1967)

Meral Danış Beştaş MP
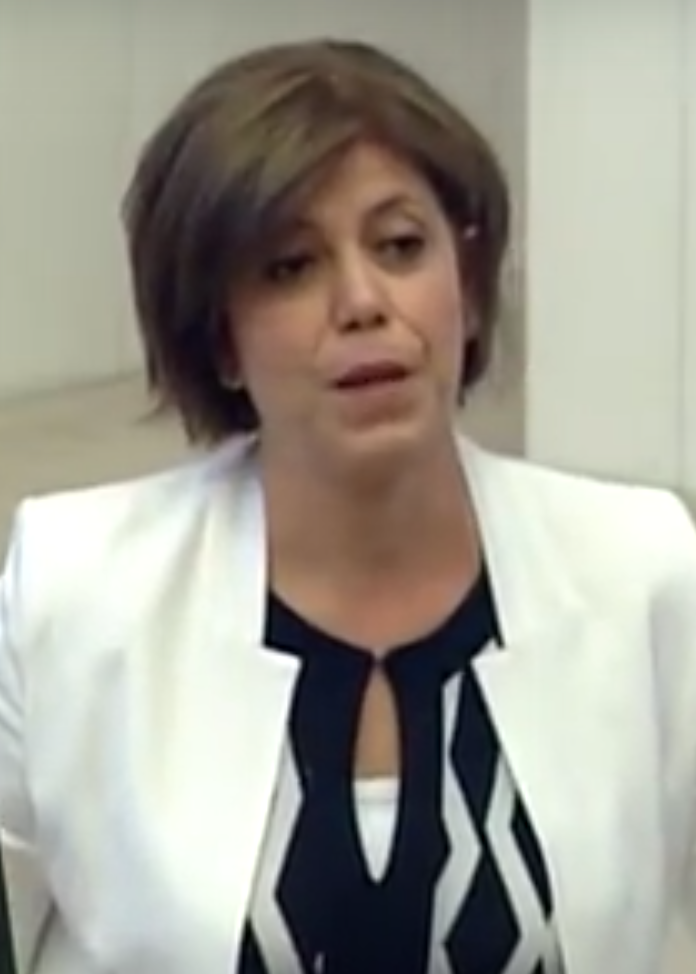

Member of the Grand National Assembly
- Incumbent
- Assumed office 23 June 2015
- Constituency: Adana (June 2015, Nov 2015); Siirt (2018); Erzurum (2023)

Personal details
- Born: 5 April 1967 (age 59) Mardin, Turkey
- Party: Peoples' Equality and Democracy Party (DEM Party) (2023-present)
- Other political affiliations: Peoples' Democratic Party (HDP) (2015-2023)
- Spouse: Mesut Beştaş
- Children: 2
- Education: Dicle University
- Occupation: Lawyer, Politician

Meral Danış Beştaş (born 5 April 1967) is a Kurdish politician from the Peoples' Democratic Party (HDP), who has served as a Member of Parliament since 23 June 2015.

== Early life and education ==
Born in Mardin, Beştaş graduated from Dicle University Faculty of Law in 1990. She was detained on the 16 November 1993, together with her husband, accused of being a courier for the PKK. Between the 15 November 1993 and 21 December 1993, 16 lawyers who defended clients accused of being affiliated with the PKK were detained. Beştaş was released on the 10 December 1993 together with 12 other lawyers. All 16 lawyers alleged that due to their detention their rights were violated, and they filed a complaint at the European Commission of Human Rights. In 2003 she was granted with an indemnification of 14.000 Euros for having been unlawfully detained for 24 days.

== Political career ==
She is currently a co-deputy president of the HDP, and was elected as a HDP Member of Parliament at the June 2015 general election and has been reelected in the November 2015 and the June 2018 general election.

=== Political views ===
She is in favor of the abolishment of the law which prohibits to insult the Turkish president and is of the view that politicians in general should be able to be insulted. Beştaş is of the view that the closure case against the HDP is motivated by the Justice and Development Party (AKP), which itself had survived a closure case in 2008.

=== Political prosecution ===
She was arrested on 30 January 2017, accused of having taken part in a HDP board meeting during which, the prosecution believes, it was decided by the HDP to call for protests in support of the YPG fighting against the Islamic State in Kobanî. She was released on 21 April 2017 pending trial. In 2018 the constitutional court ordered the Turkish treasury to pay Beştaş 20'000 Turkish lira for having been imprisoned unjustly; as, even though Beştaş was a board member, it was not proven she voted in favor of the protests. Turkish prosecutors announced on 13 February 2018 that they were seeking a 25-year prison term for Beştaş. On 17 March 2021, the State Prosecutor before the Court of Cassation of Turkey Bekir Şahin filed a lawsuit before the Constitutional Court demanding for her and 686 other HDP politicians a five-year ban to engage in politics. The lawsuit was filed jointly with a request for a closure of the HDP due to the party's alleged organizational links with the PKK.

== Personal life ==
Meral Danış Beştaş is married and has two children.
