= Istanbul (3rd electoral district) =

Electoral district for the Grand National Assembly of Turkey

Coordinates: 37°50′N 34°45′E

Istanbul (III)
- electoral district for the Grand National Assembly of Turkey
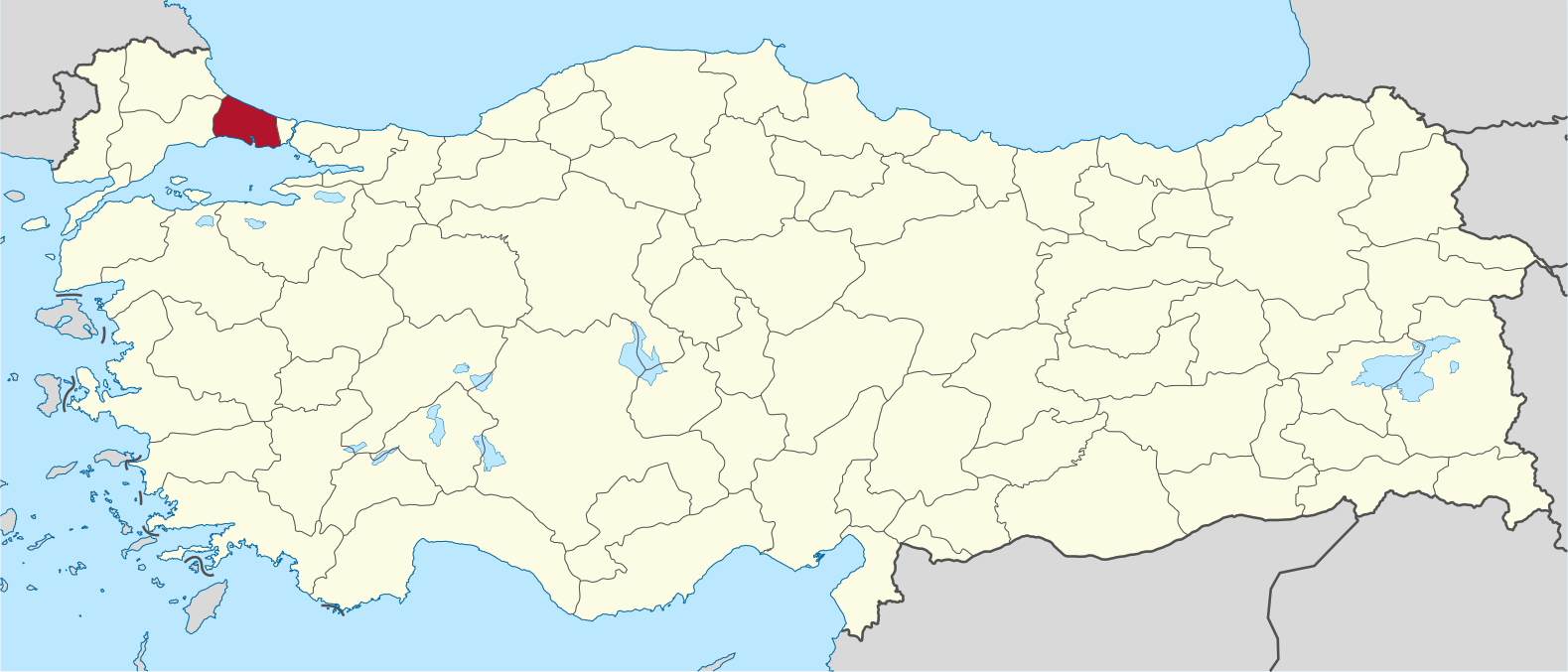
- Istanbul (III) shown within Turkey
- Province: Istanbul
- Electorate: 3,696,176 (2018)

Current electoral district
- Created: 1923
- Seats: 35 Historical: 31 (2015) 25 (2002–2007) 22 (1999)
- Parent district: Istanbul
- Turnout at last election: 87.73%
- Representation
- AK Party: 15 / 35
- CHP: 9 / 35
- HDP: 5 / 35
- MHP: 3 / 35
- İYİ: 3 / 35

Istanbul's third electoral district is one of three divisions of the Istanbul electoral district for the purpose of elections to Grand National Assembly of Turkey. It elects thirty-five members of parliament (deputies) to represent the district for a five-year term by the D'Hondt method, a party-list proportional representation system.

The district partially covers the European side of the Province of Istanbul, on the west of the Bosphorus. The second electoral district is situated to the east while the first electoral district occupies the Anatolian side of Istanbul on the east side of the Bosphorus.

== Division ==
The third electoral district contains the following Istanbul administrative districts (ilçe):

- Arnavutköy
- Avcılar
- Bağcılar
- Bahçelievler
- Bakırköy
- Başakşehir
- Beylikdüzü
- Büyükçekmece
- Çatalca
- Esenyurt
- Güngören
- Küçükçekmece
- Silivri

== Members ==
Population reviews of each electoral district are conducted before each general election, which can lead to certain districts being granted a smaller or greater number of parliamentary seats. Istanbul (III) gained 3 extra seats for the 2011 general election, thus electing 28 seats as opposed to 25 that it elected in 2002 and 2007. In 1999, the district elected 22 MPs.

MPs for Istanbul (III), 1999 onwards
Election	1999 (21st Parliament)	2002 (22nd Parliament)	2007 (23rd Parliament)	2011 (24th Parliament)	June 2015 (25th Parliament)
MP	Abdul Ahat Andıcan; ANAP	Abdülkadir Aksu; AK Party			
MP	Şadan Tuzcu; ANAP	Ali Coşkun; AK Party	Fuat Bol; AK Party	Hakan Şükür; AK Party / Independent	
MP	Aydın Ağan Ayaydın; ANAP	Güldal Akşit; AK Party		Ömer Dinçer; AK Party	
MP	Bülent Akarcalı; ANAP	Lokman Ayva; AK Party		Mustafa Şentop; AK Party	
MP	Şamil Ayrım; ANAP	Nevzat Yalçıntaş; AK Party	Reha Çamuroğlu; AK Party	Tülay Kaynarca; AK Party	
MP	Bahri Sipahi; DSP	Ünal Kacır; AK Party			
MP	Bülent Ersin Gök; DSP	Halide İncekara; AK Party			
MP	Erdoğan Toprak; DSP	İdris Naim Şahin; AK Party		Nureddin Nebati; AK Party	
MP	İsmail Aydınlı; DSP	Azmi Ateş; AK Party	Feyzullah Kıyıklık; AK Party		
MP	Masum Türker; DSP	Nazim Ekren; AK Party		Mehmet Doğan Kubat; AK Party	
MP	Mustafa Düz; DSP	Cengiz Kaptanoğlu; AK Party	Mehmet Domaç; AK Party	Bülent Turan; AK Party	
MP	Nazire Karakuş; DSP	İnci Gülser Özdemir; AK Party	Alev Dedegil; AK Party	Mehmet Muş; AK Party	
MP	Necdet Saruhan; DSP	Yahya Baş; AK Party	Mehmet Müezzinoğlu; AK Party	Gülay Dalyan; AK Party	
MP	Rıdvan Budak; DSP	Mehmet Mustafa Açıkalin; AK Party	İbrahim Yiğit; AK Party	Enver Yılmaz; AK Party	
MP	Tansu Çiller; DYP	İbrahim Reyhan Özal; AK Party	Necla Arat; CHP	Sevim Savaşer; AK Party	
MP	Abdülkadir Aksu; Virtue	İlhan Albayrak; AK Party	Atila Kaya; MHP		
MP	Azmi Ateş; Virtue	Yaşar Nuri Öztürk; CHP	Meral Akşener; MHP		
MP	Mukadder Başeğmez; Virtue	Sidika Aydoğan; CHP	Sacid Yıldız; CHP	İhsan Barutçu; MHP / Independent	
MP	Osman Yumakoğulları; Virtue	Halil Akyüz; CHP	Sebahat Tuncel; Independent	Abdullah Levent Tüzel; Independent / HDP	
MP	Esat Öz; MHP	Ahmet Güryüz Ketenci; CHP	Esfender Korkmaz; CHP	Sabahat Akkiraz; CHP	
MP	Mehmet Gül; MHP	İsmet Atalay; CHP	Hasan Macit; CHP	Erdoğan Toprak; CHP	
MP	Mehmet Pak; MHP	Şükrü Mustafa Elekdağ; CHP		Umut Oran; CHP	
MP	No seat	Birgen Keleş; CHP		Süleyman Çelebi; CHP	
MP	No seat	Zeynep Damla Gürel; CHP	Hüseyin Mert; CHP	Oktay Ekşi; CHP	
MP	No seat	Mehmet Ali Özpolat; CHP		Binnaz Toprak; CHP	
MP	No seat			Faik Tunay; CHP	
MP	No seat			Ali Özgündüz; CHP	
MP	No seat			Ferit Mevlüt Aslanoğlu; CHP	
MP	No seat				

== General elections ==
=== 2023 ===
The following MPs were elected to the 28th Parliament of Turkey in the 2023 Turkish parliamentary election.

Numan Kurtulmuş	Justice and Development Party	
Özlem Zengin	Justice and Development Party	
Cüneyt Yüksel	Justice and Development Party	
Zekeriya Yapıcıoğlu	Justice and Development Party	Free Cause Party
Halis Dalkılıç	Justice and Development Party	
Rümeysa Kadak	Justice and Development Party	
Oğuz Üçüncü	Justice and Development Party	
Bayram Şenocak	Justice and Development Party	
Şamil Ayrım	Justice and Development Party	
Seda Gören Bölük	Justice and Development Party	
Nilhan Ayan	Justice and Development Party	
Yıldız Konal Süslü	Justice and Development Party	
Şengül Karslı	Justice and Development Party	
Yücel Arzen Hacıoğulları	Justice and Development Party	
Engin Altay	Republican People's Party	
Erdoğan Toprak	Republican People's Party	
Türkan Elçi	Republican People's Party	
İlhan Kesici	Republican People's Party	
Zeynel Emre	Republican People's Party	
Mustafa Yeneroğlu	Republican People's Party	Democracy and Progress Party
Medeni Yılmaz	Republican People's Party	Democracy and Progress Party
Bülent Kaya	Republican People's Party	Felicity Party
Doğan Demir	Republican People's Party	Felicity Party (Note: Member of Future Party, elected in Republican People's Party lists, joined Felicity Party to be able to form a parliamentary group together.)
Özgür Karabat	Republican People's Party	
Turan Taşkın Özer	Republican People's Party	
Çiğdem Kılıçgün Uçar	Party of Greens and the Left Future	
İskender Bayhan	Party of Greens and the Left Future	Labour Party
Çiçek Otlu	Party of Greens and the Left Future	
Celal Fırat	Party of Greens and the Left Future	
Ersin Beyaz	Good Party	
Seyithan İzsiz	Good Party	
Ayşe Sibel Yanıkömeroğlu	Good Party	
Feti Yıldız	Nationalist Movement Party	
İsmail Faruk Aksu	Nationalist Movement Party	
Erkan Baş	Workers' Party of Turkey	
Doğan Bekin	New Welfare Party	

=== 2011 ===
2011 general election: Istanbul (III)
Party	Candidate	Votes	%	±%
AK Party	15 elected ▲1: 1. Ömer Dinçer ✓; 2. Abdülkadir Aksu ✓; 3. Ünal Kacır ✓; 4. Hakan Şükür ✓; 5. Halide İncekara ✓; 6. Mustafa Şentop ✓; 7. Feyzullah Kıyıklık ✓; 8. Tülay Kaynarca ✓; 9. Nureddin Nebati ✓; 10. Mehmet Doğan Kubat ✓; 11. Bülent Turan ✓; 12. Mehmet Muş ✓; 13. Gülay Dalyan ✓; 14. Enver Yılmaz ✓; 15. Harun Karaca ✓; 16. Cemal Özdemir ✗; 17. Alpay Tarhan ✗; 18. Behiye Eker Albayrak ✗; 19. Sadık Danışman ✗; 20. Emrah Kulaklı ✗; 21. Esra Deniz ✗; 22. Mezemmil Hevadpal ✗; 23. Abdullah Başçı ✗; 24. Hayati Güllük ✗; 25. Necati Karagöz ✗; 26. İsa Gümüş ✗; 27. Yusuf İşler ✗; 28. Salih Çağdaş ✗	1,265,826	49.01	▲3.16
CHP	9 elected ▲1: 1. Erdoğan Toprak ✓; 2. Umut Oran ✓; 3. Süleyman Çelebi ✓; 4. Osman Oktay Ekşi ✓; 5. Binnaz Toprak ✓; 6. Sabahat Akkiraz ✓; 7. Faik Tunay ✓; 8. Ali Özgündüz ✓; 9. Ferit Mevlüt Aslanoğlu ✓; 10. Muhammet Çakmak ✗; 11. Kenan Şimşek ✗; 12. Mehmet Ali Özpolat ✗; 13. Kamil Uğurlu ✗; 14. Bülent Kerimoğlu ✗; 15. Kutsiye Benan Baykal ✗; 16. Orhan Duran ✗; 17. Selami Özdemir ✗; 18. Bayramali Çeşmeci ✗; 19. Hüseyin Aydoğdu ✗; 20. Berrin Balcı ✗; 21. Derya Ekşi ✗; 22. Yeğane Güley ✗; 23. Emir Hüseyin Akın ✗; 24. Özge Utan ✗; 25. Turan Aydoğan ✗; 26. Taşkın Kılıç ✗; 27. Cevahir Kılıç ✗; 28. Tacettin Devran Çakmakçı ✗	790,484	30.61	▲5.52
MHP	3 elected ▲1: 1. Meral Akşener ✓; 2. Atilla Kaya ✓; 3. Mehmet Taytak ✓; 4. İhsan Barutçu ✗; 5. Ahmet Mucip Gökçen ✗; 6. Timur Can Ulusoy ✗; 7. Ahmet Turgut ✗; 8. Pınar Ergenekon ✗; 9. Ercüment Yavuz Kılıç ✗; 10. Orhan Genikli ✗; 11. Sayit Yusuf ✗; 12. Zeynep Yaman ✗; 13. Ali Ekber Yeşil ✗; 14. Erdem Demirci ✗; 15. Doğan Avcı ✗; 16. Azmi Karamahmutoğlu ✗; 17. Enver Demir ✗; 18. Gülay Doğanay ✗; 19. Hami Arıcı ✗; 20. Fazlı Yurdabak ✗; 21. Aysun Özer ✗; 22. Bahattin Şengül ✗; 23. İsmet Güngör ✗; 24. Funda Özkan ✗; 25. Mustafa Ertekin ✗; 26. Şenol Vatansever ✗; 27. Muharrem Yıldız ✗; 28. Mehmet Yasin Muratal ✗	257,456	9.97	▼1.50
Independent	1 elected 0: Abdullah Levent Tüzel ✓ Teoman Aydan ✗ Hasan Özbey ✗ İsa Karaduman ✗ Cafer Özsoy ✗ Ümit Ülgen ✗ Ömer Coşkun ✗ Hanefi Avcı ✗ Mustafa Avcı ✗ Güneş Öztanrısever ✗	156,478	6.06	▼0.01
SAADET	None elected: 1. Hasan Bitmez ✗; 2. Ali İhsan Gündoğdu ✗; 3. Abdulkadir Çelebi ✗; 4. Ebrar Bezci ✗; 5. Ahmet Küçükağa ✗; 6. Celal Ustacan ✗; 7. Osman Baş ✗; 8. Hüseyin Kavlu ✗; 9. Veli Tunç ✗; 10. Beşir İstemi ✗; 11. Ramazan Boyalık ✗; 12. Sebahattin Uçar ✗; 13. Yunus Aksoy ✗; 14. Hayati Gül ✗; 15. Emine Öztürk ✗; 16. Ender Esiner ✗; 17. Ali Küçük ✗; 18. Metin Öztürk ✗; 19. Erdal Yılmaz ✗; 20. Adem Çalış ✗; 21. Erdinç Adanır ✗; 22. Ebubekir Erduran ✗; 23. Abdullah İlkadlı ✗; 24. Muhammet Resuloğlu ✗; 25. Turgay Akar ✗; 26. Mürsel Başer ✗; 27. Adem Okutan ✗; 28. Erol Karabulut ✗	35,302	1.37	▼1.18
HAS Party	None elected: 1. Zeki Kılıçaslan ✗; 2. Mukadder Başeğmez ✗; 3. Musa Akbal ✗; 4. Erol Erdoğan ✗; 5. Yusuf Engin ✗; 6. Zeynep Çanak ✗; 7. Süleyman Pektaş ✗; 8. Yaşar Yerlikaya ✗; 9. Atilla Yılmaz ✗; 10. Zeynep Camcı ✗; 11. Selim Darıcı ✗; 12. Abdurrahman Zafer Çuhadar ✗; 13. Fatih Dursunkaya ✗; 14. Mustafa Işık Şadi Kaşo ✗; 15. Mehmet Faruk Haberveren ✗; 16. Yavuz Kaskan ✗; 17. Dilşad Tülgen Öztürk ✗; 18. Hikmet Yıldırım ✗; 19. Abdulkadir Ayyılmaz ✗; 20. Zübeyir Bekiroğlu ✗; 21. Nil Gülsüm Gül ✗; 22. Nigar Hilal Bayram Polat ✗; 23. Muhammet Ali Aygün ✗; 24. Fatmagül Yakar ✗; 25. Nedim Altun ✗; 26. Emrah Evren Diğa ✗; 27. Servet Yazıcı ✗; 28. Yusuf Yıldız ✗	17,927	0.69	▲0.69
Büyük Birlik	None elected: 1. Tuna Koç ✗; 2. Ahmet Rüştü Çelebi ✗; 3. Remzi Akkoyun ✗; 4. İrfan Bulut ✗; 5. Suzan Çelik ✗; 6. Türkan Karabulut ✗; 7. Abdülkadir Kalay ✗; 8. Ayhan Gökçe ✗; 9. Mehmet Cem Özel ✗; 10. Ziya Karacan ✗; 11. Tolga Aral ✗; 12. Zafer Erel ✗; 13. İbrahim Çelebi ✗; 14. Durmuş Aslan ✗; 15. Sancar Kaya ✗; 16. Aslan Baykara ✗; 17. Şevki Çay ✗; 18. Halil Saka ✗; 19. Mustafa Çırakkatı ✗; 20. Sultan Erdoğan ✗; 21. Bülent Dağdeviren ✗; 22. Mahsen Uçan ✗; 23. Muhammed Enes Kaya ✗; 24. Abdulkadir Karahan ✗; 25. Ömer Kavran ✗; 26. Mustafa Taş ✗; 27. Nuri Dost ✗; 28. Mahmut Yazıcı ✗	15,495	0.60	▲0.60
DP	None elected: 1. Muharrem Bayraktar ✗; 2. Selim Kotil ✗; 3. Fuzuli Bektaş ✗; 4. Faruk Korça ✗; 5. Yasin Elmaslı ✗; 6. Mehmet Solmaz ✗; 7. Sıddıka Semahat Demir ✗; 8. Gürkan Akbaba ✗; 9. Necmettin Dönmez ✗; 10. Sabiha Karamustafa ✗; 11. Poyraz Uşkay ✗; 12. Ulviye Cansu Hondor ✗; 13. Hürriyet Ercan ✗; 14. Neslihan Barkın Tümay ✗; 15. Semra Atasoy ✗; 16. Meltem Önder ✗; 17. İlker Hakan Terzioğlu ✗; 18. Vildan Gencoğlu Çeçen ✗; 19. Aygün Mahmutoğlu ✗; 20. Özcan Cirit ✗; 21. Gökhan Tapan ✗; 22. Seven Yılmaztürk ✗; 23. Dilşat Sevgi Sayın ✗; 24. Kenan Cengiz ✗; 25. Seval Süzgün ✗; 26. Ali Kılıç ✗; 27. Cumhur Akgün ✗; 28. Şakir Aynacı ✗	11,693	0.45	▼2.59
HEPAR	None elected: 1. İlyas Murat ✗; 2. Nur Yasemin Ölçener ✗; 3. Celal Topuz ✗; 4. Gökhan Er ✗; 5. Türker Uygun ✗; 6. Ayşe Uçar ✗; 7. Birgül Köşemeci ✗; 8. Sevgi Kefeli ✗; 9. Zeynep Karataş ✗; 10. Haluk Sarıcı ✗; 11. Nurten Loklar ✗; 12. Fatma Kocadüz ✗; 13. Hasan Aras ✗; 14. Ergin Mutaflar ✗; 15. Burcu Konuk ✗; 16. Hamdi Serkan Konuk ✗; 17. Bekir Sıtkı Baysın ✗; 18. Birgen Şıdım ✗; 19. Serdar Şıdım ✗; 20. Ayfer Zehra Baysın ✗; 21. Mustafa Sönmez ✗; 22. Oya Şeker ✗; 23. Belgin Bahar ✗; 24. Seyhan Akdere ✗; 25. Kevser Keser ✗; 26. Figen Bilgen ✗; 27. İsmail Hakkı Özaras ✗; 28. Celal Atılgan ✗	11,064	0.43	▲0.43
TKP	None elected: 1. Hüseyin Karabulut ✗; 2. Serkan Arıkışı ✗; 3. Yaşar Çelik ✗; 4. Selin Dingiloğlu ✗; 5. Ersin Kılaf ✗; 6. İbrahim Ağçal ✗; 7. Özge Helvacıoğlu Ballı ✗; 8. Turan Soydan Keneş ✗; 9. İlhami Durmazkeser ✗; 10. Atakan Bağış ✗; 11. Kazım Akgül ✗; 12. Fatma Keleş ✗; 13. İsmail Arısoy ✗; 14. Şafak Karaçan ✗; 15. Kenan Kündür ✗; 16. Aynur Alataş ✗; 17. Faruk Acar ✗; 18. Hasan Ali Yanıker ✗; 19. İsmet Küçükler ✗; 20. Zafer Yavuz ✗; 21. Tülün İçil ✗; 22. Fulya Durak ✗; 23. Ahmet Günaydın ✗; 24. Saime Yılmaz ✗; 25. Volkan Surgün ✗; 26. Nurdan Yılmaz ✗; 27. Vahit Atam ✗; 28. Önder Özütemiz ✗	6,188	0.24	▲0.04
DSP	None elected: 1. Hasan Macit ✗; 2. Hüseyin Mert ✗; 3. Yalçın Avcı ✗; 4. Asuman Sarıgül ✗; 5. Mustafa Özkan Kökçeli ✗; 6. Hasan Fehmi Yavuzalp ✗; 7. Hüseyin Ekici ✗; 8. Muammer Özkoca ✗; 9. Emin Doğan Aydın ✗; 10. Yüksel Yaşar ✗; 11. Esin Gündoğmaz Dönmez ✗; 12. Kurtuluş Bazu ✗; 13. Arif Özbay ✗; 14. Bulcan Ergun ✗; 15. Yakup Bektaş ✗; 16. Nihal Yüzüak ✗; 17. Semra Aydın ✗; 18. Kerim Aksu ✗; 19. Cemil Bilgiç ✗; 20. Murat Güngör ✗; 21. Orhan Dörttepe ✗; 22. Abdulaziz Şimdi ✗; 23. Ömer Burkankolu ✗; 24. Hasan Ertan ✗; 25. Esengül Alıcı ✗; 26. Kadriye Vildan Aslan ✗; 27. Zafer Zeynep Bozacı ✗; 28. Mustafa Durmaz ✗	5,996	0.23	N/A
MP	None elected: 1. Ahmet Aktaş ✗; 2. Derviş Doğan ✗; 3. Zehra Edibe Atli ✗; 4. Tülay Yılmaz ✗; 5. İhsan Turgut ✗; 6. Metin Bucak ✗; 7. Süleyman Karaoğlu ✗; 8. Sebahattin Gülmez ✗; 9. Ayten Görüşük ✗; 10. Etem Kuri ✗; 11. Fuat Çiçekli ✗; 12. Emine Özsoy ✗; 13. Hasibe Korkmaz ✗; 14. Muhittin Elmalı ✗; 15. Elif Baykara ✗; 16. Ayşe Ev ✗; 17. Abdullah Özsoy ✗; 18. Fatma Yılmaz ✗; 19. Erhan Sofu ✗; 20. Ayşe Özçelik ✗; 21. Emin Özsoy ✗; 22. Ahmet Şahap ✗; 23. İsmail Dedeoğlu ✗; 24. Hatice Ertuğrul ✗; 25. Özgen Başat ✗; 26. Halil Yalçınkaya ✗; 27. Ebubekir Yıldız ✗; 28. Ayşe Üyüklüer ✗	5,830	0.23	▲0.23
Nationalist Conservative	None elected: 1. İsmail Şeremet ✗; 2. Zafer Aşkan ✗; 3. Fatih Yardımcı ✗; 4. Samiha Yasemin ✗; 5. Uğur Kayısı ✗; 6. Mehmet Karkın ✗; 7. Hüseyin Eser ✗; 8. Nazım Metin ✗; 9. Erol Danyıldız ✗; 10. Levent Kartal ✗; 11. Çiğdem İpek ✗; 12. İdris Karabulut ✗; 13. Sönmez Döner ✗; 14. Ahmet Kıyak ✗; 15. Nuray Yeniçırak ✗; 16. Melahat Şeremet ✗; 17. Ergin Balcı ✗; 18. Ayşe Yalçın ✗; 19. Murat Karaca ✗; 20. Eser Ekinci ✗; 21. Gülümser Ünsal ✗; 22. Gönül Bektaş ✗; 23. Fulya Arnavutoğlu ✗; 24. Özlem Şeremet ✗; 25. Mecit Çelik ✗; 26. Ebubekir Özkan ✗; 27. Fahri Kılıç ✗; 28. Muharrem Sandıkçı ✗	1,791	0.07	▲0.07
LDP	None elected: 1. Ayşe Pervin Sutaş Bozkurt ✗; 2. Tuna Yıldız ✗; 3. Mahmut Karamehmetoğlu ✗; 4. İbrahim Aydın ✗; 5. Hüseyin İstafiloğlu ✗; 6. Özden Ruşen Çairli ✗; 7. İlker Özdel ✗; 8. Necdet Kuyumcu ✗; 9. Elçin Gürses ✗; 10. Muhammet Karaoğlu ✗; 11. Kemal Aydın ✗; 12. Sevin Özen ✗; 13. Mehmet Dolgun ✗; 14. Hakan Güneysu ✗; 15. Noyan Demirtaş ✗; 16. Ahmet Saygıner ✗; 17. Cumhur Güneş ✗; 18. Hikmet Peten ✗; 19. Kaya Yalçınoğlu ✗; 20. Hasan Ünlü ✗; 21. Şaban Yücel ✗; 22. Mustafa Can Duman ✗; 23. Mustafa Dilek ✗; 24. Yusuf Mercan ✗; 25. Tulin Fulya Mutlutürk ✗; 26. Hüseyin Erdoğan ✗; 27. Meryem Türesel ✗; 28. Akif Bulut Batman ✗	1,146	0.04	▼0.05
DYP	No candidates	0	0.00	▼0.00
Labour	No candidates	0	0.00	0.00
Total votes		2,582,676	100.00	
Rejected ballots		57,378	2.17	▼2.63
Turnout		2,640,054	86.43	▲5.55
AK Party hold Majority		475,342	18.41	▼2.35
