= Nadir Latif İslam =

Turkish politician (1930–2023)

Member of the Grand National Assembly of Turkey
- In office 14 October 1973 – 5 June 1977
- Constituency: Sakarya

Personal details
- Born: 1930 Adapazarı, Turkey
- Died: 19 January 2023 (aged 92–93) Sakarya Province, Turkey
- Party: AP
- Education: Ankara University, Law School
- Occupation: Lawyer

Nadir Latif İslam (1930 – 19 January 2023) was a Turkish lawyer and politician. A member of the Justice Party, he served in the Grand National Assembly from 1973 to 1977.

One of his sons, Bahadır İslam, is married to the 24th term Sakarya MP and Minister of Family and Social Policies, Ayşenur Küllahlıoğlu İslam. His other son, 27th-term Istanbul MP Nazır Cihangir İslam, was married to 21st-term Istanbul MP Merve Kavakcı between 2010 and 2016.

İslam died in Sakarya Province on 19 January 2023.
