= Istanbul (1st electoral district) =

Electoral district for the Grand National Assembly of Turkey

Coordinates: 37°50′N 34°45′E

Istanbul (I)
- electoral district for the Grand National Assembly of Turkey
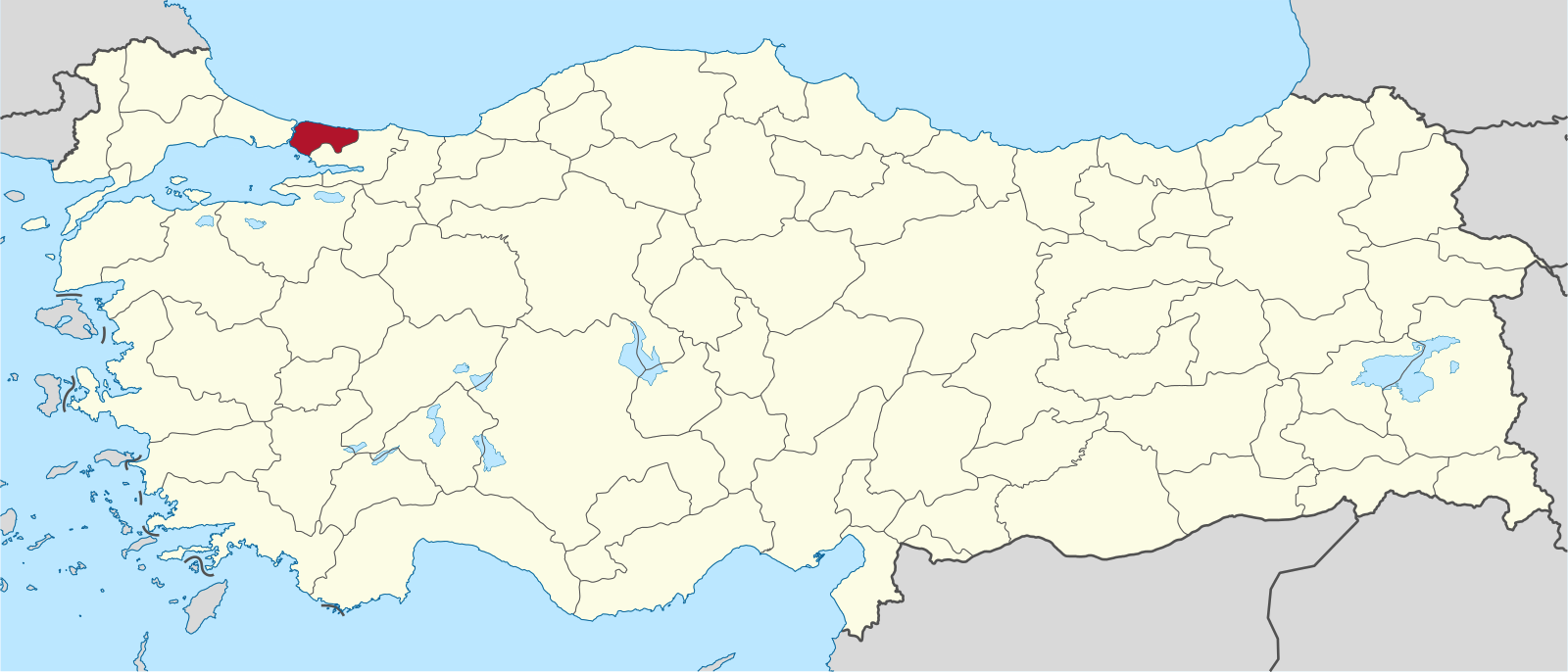
- Istanbul (I) shown within Turkey
- Province: Istanbul
- Electorate: 3,820,086

Current electoral district
- Created: 1923
- Seats: 35
- Parent district: Istanbul
- Turnout at last election: 89.10%
- Representation
- AK Party: 15 / 35
- CHP: 10 / 35
- DEM: 3 / 35
- MHP: 3 / 35
- İYİ: 3 / 35

Istanbul's first electoral district is one of three divisions of the Istanbul electoral district for the purpose of elections to Grand National Assembly of Turkey. It elects thirty-five members of parliament (deputies) to represent the district for a five-year term by the D'Hondt method, a party-list proportional representation system.

The district covers the entire Anatolian side of the Istanbul Province, on the east of the Bosphorus. Currently, one seat is vacant because of the death of Sırrı Süreyya Önder, Member of Parliament and Deputy Speaker of The Grand National Assembly from DEM Party.

== Division ==
The first electoral district contains the following Istanbul administrative districts (ilçe):

- Adalar
- Ataşehir
- Beykoz
- Çekmeköy
- Kadıköy
- Kartal
- Maltepe
- Pendik
- Sancaktepe
- Sultanbeyli
- Şile
- Tuzla
- Ümraniye
- Üsküdar

== Members ==
Population reviews of each electoral district are conducted before each general election, which can lead to certain districts being granted a smaller or greater number of parliamentary seats. İstanbul (I) gained 6 extra seats for the 2011 general election, thus electing 30 seats as opposed to 24 that it elected in 1999, 2002 and 2007.

MPs for Istanbul (I), 1999 onwards
Election	1999 (21st Parliament)	2002 (22nd Parliament)	2007 (23rd Parliament)	2011 (24th Parliament)	June 2015 (25th Parliament)
MP	Mehmet Ali İrtemçelik; ANAP	Kemal Unakıtan; AK Party	Recep Tayyip Erdoğan; AK Party		
MP	Cavit Kavak; ANAP	İrfan Gündüz; AK Party		Egemen Bağış; AK Party	
MP	Suhan Özkan; ANAP	Tayyar Altikulaç; AK Party	İdris Güllüce; AK Party		
MP	Ediz Hun; ANAP	Mustafa Ataş; AK Party			
MP	Güneş Taner; ANAP	Mehmet Beyazit Denizolgun; AK Party		Erol Kaya; AK Party	
MP	Bülent Ecevit; DSP	Nusret Bayraktar; AK Party		Mihrimah Belma Satır; AK Party	
MP	Nami Cağan; DSP	Binali Yildirim; AK Party	Ertuğrul Günay; AK Party	Muhammed Çetin; AK Party / Independent	
MP	Ahmet Tan; DSP	Hüseyin Besli; AK Party		İsmet Uçma; AK Party	
MP	Süleyman Yağız; DSP	Gülseren Topuzlu; AK Party	Mesude Nursuna Memecan; AK Party	Alev Dedegil; AK Party	
MP	Erol Al; DSP	Gürsoy Erol; AK Party	Edibe Sözen; AK Party	Gürsoy Erol; AK Party	
MP	Sulhiye Serbest; DSP	Mehmet Sekmen; AK Party		Mehmet Domaç; AK Party	
MP	Cahit Savaş Yazıcı; DSP	Emin Şirin; AK Party	Özlem Piltanoğlu Türköne; AK Party	Osman Boyraz; AK Party	
MP	Yücel Erdemir; DSP	Ali İbiş; AK Party	Hasan Kemal Yardımcı; AK Party	Oktay Saral; AK Party	
MP	Fadlı Ağaoğlu; DSP	Muharrem Karslı; AK Party	Ayşe Jale Ağırbaş; CHP	Metin Külünk; AK Party	
MP	Hayri Kozakcıoğlu; DYP	Kemal Derviş; CHP	İlhan Kesici; CHP	Ahmet Berat Çonkar; AK Party	
MP	Aydın Menderes; Virtue	Algan Hacaloğlu; CHP		Muhammet Bilal Macit; AK Party	
MP	Süleyman Arif Emre; Virtue	Ali Kemal Kumkumoğlu; CHP	Durmuşali Torlak; MHP	Engin Alan; MHP	
MP	İrfan Gündüz; Virtue	Berhan Şimşek; CHP	Gündüz Suphi Aktan; MHP	Bülent Didinmez; MHP	
MP	Merve Kavakçı; Virtue	Ahmet Sirri Özbek; CHP	Mehmet Ufuk Uras; Independent	Sebahat Tuncel; Independent / HDP	
MP	Ali Oğuz; Virtue	Hasan Aydin; CHP	Fatma Nur Serter; CHP		
MP	Fuat Fırat; Virtue	Ali Topuz; CHP		Mehmet Akif Hamzaçebi; CHP	
MP	Mustafa Verkaya; MHP	Ömer Zülfü Livanelioğlu; CHP	Bayramali Meral; CHP	Gürsel Tekin; CHP	
MP	Bozkurt Yaşar Öztürk; MHP	Güldal Okuducu; CHP	Şinasi Öktem; CHP	Osman Taney Korutürk; CHP	
MP	Ahmet Çakar; MHP	Ali Riza Gülçiçek; CHP	Ahmet Tan; CHP	Ayşe Eser Danışoğlu; CHP	
MP	No seat			Şafak Pavey; CHP	
MP	No seat			İhsan Özkes; CHP	
MP	No seat			Mahmut Tanal; CHP	
MP	No seat			Müslüm Sarı; CHP	
MP	No seat			Celal Dinçer; CHP	
MP	No seat			Kadir Gökmen Öğüt; CHP	
MP	No seat				

== General elections ==
=== 2011 ===
2011 general election: Istanbul (I)
Party	Candidate	Votes	%	±%
AK Party	16 elected ▲3: 1. Recep Tayyip Erdoğan ✓; 2. Egemen Bağış ✓; 3. İdris Güllüce ✓; 4. Erol Kaya ✓; 5. Mihrimah Belma Satır ✓; 6. Mustafa Ataş ✓; 7. Muhammed Çetin ✓; 8. İsmet Uçma ✓; 9. Gürsoy Erol ✓; 10. Alev Dedegil ✓; 11. Mehmet Domaç ✓; 12. Osman Boyraz ✓; 13. Oktay Saral ✓; 14. Metin Külünk ✓; 15. Ahmet Berat Çonkar ✓; 16. Muhammet Bilal Macit ✓; 17. Meltem Gürler ✗; 18. Özlem Öztekin Vural ✗; 19. Alican Taşçı ✗; 20. Serkan Bayram ✗; 21. Fahri Yasin Şener ✗; 22. Bilal Topçu ✗; 23. Hakkı Şanlı ✗; 24. Derviş Yücel ✗; 25. Ayşegül Esra Atik ✗; 26. Faruk Bilal Şener ✗; 27. Mehmet Fatih Bulaç ✗; 28. Erkan Hacısalihoğlu ✗; 30. Hayri Köse ✗	1,391,558	48.27	▲4.20
CHP	11 elected ▲3: 1. Gürsel Tekin ✓; 2. Osman Taney Korutürk ✓; 3. Mehmet Akif Hamzaçebi ✓; 4. Ayşe Eser Danişoğlu ✓; 5. Şafak Pavey ✓; 6. İhsan Özkes ✓; 7. Fatma Nur Serter ✓; 8. Mahmut Tanal ✓; 9. Müslim Sarı ✓; 10. Celal Dinçer ✓; 11. Kadir Gökmen Öğüt ✓; 12. Yakup Akkaya ✗; 13. Ayten Kayalıoğlu ✗; 14. Hasan Basri Özbek ✗; 15. Hüsnü Süslü ✗; 16. Hasan Uzunyayla ✗; 17. Osman Yazıcı ✗; 18. Hilal Dokuzcan ✗; 19. İhsan Güliz Kaptan ✗; 20. Hakan Erdemir ✗; 21. Mehtap Düzova ✗; 22. Ali Koç ✗; 23. Aras Arslan ✗; 24. Bahar Özay ✗; 25. Derya Şentürk ✗; 26. Emrah Köksal ✗; 27. Ali Yıldız ✗; 28. Murat Günel ✗; 29. Reşat Şahin Öztürk ✗; 30. Merih Türe ✗	969,038	33.62	▲3.60
MHP	2 elected 0: 1. Engin Alan ✓; 2. Bülent Didinmez ✓; 3. Durmuşali Torlak ✗; 4. Hayrettin Nuhoğlu ✗; 5. Kadir Boy ✗; 6. Fuat Fettahoğlu ✗; 7. Bahar Argın ✗; 8. Mehmet Korutürk ✗; 9. Baybora Cihan Kahveci ✗; 10. Vedat Bayram ✗; 11. Alper Kaan Boran ✗; 12. Zekeriye Gündoğdu ✗; 13. Bahattin Furuncuoğlu ✗; 14. Bülent Buz ✗; 15. Adil Erkoç ✗; 16. Hasan Ali Karasar ✗; 17. Namık Kemal Kurt ✗; 18. Umur Arıkan ✗; 19. Emine Saadet Karlıbel ✗; 20. Cavit Gül ✗; 21. Cengiz Gökçe ✗; 22. Levent Akçay ✗; 23. Zeycan Güzelsoy ✗; 24. Senol Yöndemir ✗; 25. Sabri Şenel ✗; 26. Arif Tevetoelu ✗; 27. Turgay Özcan ✗; 28. Sedat Rıfat Doyum ✗; 29. Faruk Ülker ✗; 30. İbrahim Halil Atlıoglu ✗	260,825	9.05	▼0.82
Independent	1 elected 0: Sebahat Tuncel ✓ Sadun Muhlis Altuncuoğlu ✗ İbrahim Çiçek ✗ Namık Kurnaz ✗ Ahmet Tuncay Özkan ✗ Fatma Benal Yazgan ✗ Turgut Öken ✗ Tamer Aydemir ✗ Bülent Bozkurt ✗ Ertuğrul Korkut Erenkul ✗ Tufan Sevim ✗ Muhammet Gulamoğlu ✗	133,617	4.64	▼0.82
SAADET	None elected: 1. İsmail Müftüoğlu ✗; 2. Selman Esmerer ✗; 3. Abdullah Sevim ✗; 4. Yılmaz Bayat ✗; 5. Fatma Necin Gökçe ✗; 6. Halil İbrahim Arıkan ✗; 7. Zekayi Doğan ✗; 8. Erdal Uçar ✗; 9. Yusuf Yüksel ✗; 10. Ali Haydar Haksal ✗; 11. Abdülkadir Arslan ✗; 12. Hami Aydoğan ✗; 13. Ahmet Kökler ✗; 14. Kadir İbrahim Saraçbaşı ✗; 15. Mehmet Belen ✗; 16. Efrail Ozan ✗; 17. Tufan Emirçupani ✗; 18. Recai Demiryürek ✗; 19. Hasan Kahveci ✗; 20. Fatma Alkan ✗; 21. Zafer Özbek ✗; 22. Mustafa Önügören ✗; 23. Murat Kutlu Sezen ✗; 24. Mehmet Ali Özgür ✗; 25. Neşe Saraçbaşı ✗; 26. Mahmut Kılıç ✗; 27. Ahmet Kadıoğlu ✗; 28. Hayri Ayyıldız ✗; 29. Dicle Şit ✗; 30. Fahrettin Coşkun ✗	44,390	1.54	▼1.42
HAS Party	None elected: 1. Mehmet Bekaroğlu ✗; 2. Şefik Dursun ✗; 3. Bilgehan Doğru ✗; 4. Sıtkı Abdullahoğlu ✗; 5. Ahmet Kuru ✗; 6. Mustafa Murat Sözüer ✗; 7. Halil Mert ✗; 8. Nebahat Çakar ✗; 9. Ali Geylani ✗; 10. Atıf Özbey ✗; 11. Zerrin Budak ✗; 12. Yaşar Şahin ✗; 13. Orhan Şanver ✗; 14. Antoni Vilkoşevski ✗; 15. Recep Zeki İskender ✗; 16. Memet Arslan ✗; 17. Gülşen Yiğit ✗; 18. Gürol Mançi ✗; 19. Ahmet Mutlu ✗; 20. Ömer Faruk Gerçek ✗; 21. Aydın Şanlıbayrak ✗; 22. Kubilay Nasuhi Akan ✗; 23. Sinan Kerim Akoğlu ✗; 24. Metin Kutlubay ✗; 25. Fikri Kotan ✗; 26. Reşit Kızılay ✗; 27. Ayşe Ebru Koçak ✗; 28. Erbay Yağışan ✗; 29. Hayrettin Akbaba ✗; 30. Turgut Aslan ✗	21,341	0.74	▲0.74
Büyük Birlik	None elected: 1. Ahmet Türk ✗; 2. Muhittin Açıcı ✗; 3. Özer Güneş ✗; 4. Cemal Can ✗; 5. Abdullah Genç ✗; 6. Müjdat Durak ✗; 7. Hasan Güngörmez ✗; 8. Canip Yıldız ✗; 9. Bülent Taş ✗; 10. Serkan Arslan ✗; 11. Kadir Akpınar ✗; 12. Cengiz Demirci ✗; 13. Metin Dündar ✗; 14. Selma Özlü ✗; 15. Ahmet Yılmaz ✗; 16. Erdal Dalcı ✗; 17. Nurten Akbulut ✗; 18. Kamil Karataş ✗; 19. Sedat Akkuş ✗; 20. Ayhan Arslan ✗; 21. Zihni Kuturoğlu ✗; 22. Hasan Hüseyın Çelikkaya ✗; 23. Yunus Kılıç ✗; 24. Mehmet Tan ✗; 25. Necdet Kaya ✗; 26. Yahya Albayrak ✗; 27. Şenol Gedikli ✗; 28. Latif Ayaz ✗; 29. Firdevs Ayrancı ✗; 30. Seyit Korkusuz ✗	18,434	0.64	▲0.64
HEPAR	None elected: 1. Sinan İşler ✗; 2. İhsan Erkin Özkan ✗; 3. Mehmet Aziz Göksel ✗; 4. Serkan Yılmaz ✗; 5. Kubulay Tekin ✗; 6. Sertaç Çelik ✗; 7. Ali Ayhan Yılmaz ✗; 8. Mesut Karasıl ✗; 9. Çağlayan Canbulut ✗; 10. Naci Memişoğlu ✗; 11. Seyhan Ertosun ✗; 12. Ertan Duman ✗; 13. Berkin Nişel ✗; 14. Volkan Kurt ✗; 15. Alaattin Özcan ✗; 16. Serkan Duman ✗; 17. Lütfiye Tuhan ✗; 18. Nevil Arapoğlu ✗; 19. Savaş Dakak ✗; 20. Mehmet Süha Cincin ✗; 21. Uğraş Boraka ✗; 22. Aydan Geniş ✗; 23. Ramiz Çolak ✗; 24. Fevzi Yılmaz ✗; 25. Necmi Karademir ✗; 26. Volkan Acar ✗; 27. Hakan Yel ✗; 28. Deniz Karasıl ✗; 29. Davut Bora ✗; 30. Zafer Şimşek ✗	11,093	0.38	▲0.38
DP	None elected: 1. Bünyamin Ramazan Altunelli ✗; 2. Ali Ünal Emiroğlu ✗; 3. Vedat Erten ✗; 4. Ali Öz ✗; 5. Tuncay Karahancı ✗; 6. Mustafa Tunç ✗; 7. Mustafa Velioğlu ✗; 8. Yalçın Cihangiroğlu ✗; 9. Neşe Şairoğlu Torunoğlu ✗; 10. Muzaffer Karakoç ✗; 11. Salim Gelen ✗; 12. Hasan Selimoğlu ✗; 13. Ümit Yalım ✗; 14. Nesrin Çotert ✗; 15. Hakan Hüseyin Küçükali ✗; 16. Sevtap Uzakgiden ✗; 17. Gülşen Musluoğlu ✗; 18. Hidayet Demir ✗; 19. Mehmet Şerafettin Ünver ✗; 20. Meral Çevik ✗; 21. Mustafa Salih Peker ✗; 22. Mustafa Akoğlu ✗; 23. İlyas Turgay ✗; 24. Hülya Karalı ✗; 25. Arif Melih Çimir ✗; 26. Levent Yılmaz ✗; 27. Abdulkadir Kacemer ✗; 28. Naciye Avşar ✗; 29. Nimet Bulut ✗; 30. Selma Arıklar ✗	10,756	0.37	▼2.71
DSP	None elected: 1. Masum Türker ✗; 2. Ayşe Jale Ağırbaş ✗; 3. Derya Ataman Koçlar ✗; 4. Orhan Yeşilyurt ✗; 5. Cemil Mirasoglu ✗; 6. Ercüment Tahiroğlu ✗; 7. Mahmut Tekin Peker ✗; 8. Emine Birnur Yenier ✗; 9. Ayşe Çöl ✗; 10. Hakkı Çarpa ✗; 11. Eyüp Cem Karaoglu ✗; 12. Suna Uslu ✗; 13. Ahmet Mümtaz Maden ✗; 14. Raziye Karabey ✗; 15. Hasan Çevik ✗; 16. Cevdet Kurt ✗; 17. Sami Boztepe ✗; 18. Orhan Erten ✗; 19. Hüseyin Gökçeoğlu ✗; 20. Sinem Arslan ✗; 21. Hacı Kemal Oruç ✗; 22. Ayşe Hülya Yüceer ✗; 23. Manuk İşyapar ✗; 24. Erdoğan Kapan ✗; 25. Adem Ercan ✗; 26. Zeki Yıldız ✗; 27. Ergül Yurdagün ✗; 28. Ömer Tabak ✗; 29. Selami Özsoy ✗; 30. Musdava Orhan Türk ✗	5,932	0.21	N/A
TKP	None elected: 1. Kurtuluş Kılçer ✗; 2. Ali Önder Öndeş ✗; 3. Mustafa Oğuz Kavala ✗; 4. Kemal Parlak ✗; 5. Mehmet Barış ✗; 6. Memet Adıgüzel ✗; 7. Refet Özkan ✗; 8. Hasan Şükrü Aykutlu ✗; 9. Şaduman Özyürek ✗; 10. Gül Feride Puhaloglu ✗; 11. Şehriban Sipahi ✗; 12. Tonguç Koç ✗; 13. Hüseyin Harmancı ✗; 14. Emine Suna ✗; 15. Yusuf Yılmaz ✗; 16. Recep Selçuk Özel ✗; 17. Yusuf Ziya Cansız ✗; 18. Dilek Günsel Doğan ✗; 19. Dilsaz Padar ✗; 20. Ali Ayık ✗; 21. Hasan Hüseyin Baykara ✗; 22. Ogün Hakan Küçükünal ✗; 23. Bahtiyar Şahin ✗; 24. Özgül Demir Afacan ✗; 25. Olcay Tayanç ✗; 26. Hüsniye Yeleser ✗; 27. Türkhan Kıymazaslan Yılmaz ✗; 28. Onur Aydın ✗; 29. Mesut Eren ✗; 30. Mahmut Ufuk Alp ✗	5,729	0.20	▼0.03
MP	None elected: 1. Mevlüt Koçoğlu ✗; 2. Abdullatif Metin ✗; 3. Bahri Gödek ✗; 4. Salim Demirezen ✗; 5. Navruz Ceylan ✗; 6. Kadir Duru ✗; 7. Aynur Karataş ✗; 8. Esad Batal ✗; 9. Hasan Ayhan ✗; 10. İbrahim Ayan ✗; 11. İbrahim Abdullahoğlu ✗; 12. Turan Er ✗; 13. Orhan Yay ✗; 14. Ahmet Korkut Çiçekli ✗; 15. Osman Gökmen ✗; 16. Mehmet Zeki Alagöz ✗; 17. Ahmet Şirin ✗; 18. Akif Akgün ✗; 19. Hasan Bucak ✗; 20. Asiye Karaoğlu ✗; 21. Nalan Savaş ✗; 22. Emişe Söğüt ✗; 23. Mustafa Yıldız ✗; 24. Hidayet Uslu ✗; 25. Ahmet Yarılkaya ✗; 26. Süheyla Şahin ✗; 27. Fatma Nacar ✗; 28. Birsen Gökçe ✗; 29. Melehat Özeren ✗; 30. Gülten Erdoğan ✗	4,811	0.17	▲0.17
DYP	None elected: 1. Çetin Özaçıkgöz ✗; 2. Erol Tutal ✗; 3. Muharrem Ayrancı ✗; 4. Şaban Saltık ✗; 5. Yakup Ekşi ✗; 6. Erol Özbek ✗; 7. Mehmet Nebih Ber ✗; 8. Güler Arda ✗; 9. Tayfur Yıldırım ✗; 10. Mehmet Sait Şimşek ✗; 11. Oğuzhan Altınsoy ✗; 12. Ali Çetinkaya ✗; 13. Abdurrahman Aydın ✗; 14. Ahmet Zekayi Altınsoy ✗; 15. Bilge Coşgun ✗; 16. Fatma Kıbrıs ✗; 17. Zeynep Akkaya ✗; 18. Murat Yağlı ✗; 19. Osman Taşçı ✗; 20. Kasım Parlak ✗; 21. Serpil Çalım ✗; 22. Ülya Keskin ✗; 23. Murat Ulağ ✗; 24. Bilal Ek ✗; 25. Songül Çalı ✗; 26. Adem Tunç ✗; 27. Arif Demir ✗; 28. Andaç Dülgeroglu ✗; 29. Mehmet Üzüm ✗; 30. Metin Yaycı ✗	2,759	0.10	▲0.10
Nationalist Conservative	None elected: 1. Sema Ersan ✗; 2. Hüseyin Kurdoğlu ✗; 3. İlhan Cankaya ✗; 4. Meryem Kuru Kabaca ✗; 5. Tulga Işık ✗; 6. Levent Ocakçı ✗; 7. Orhan Demiroğlu ✗; 8. Bora Yılmaz ✗; 9. Yakup Gedik ✗; 10. Zekeriya Öztürk ✗; 11. Celal Karataş ✗; 12. Tamer Turgut ✗; 13. Veysel Keskin ✗; 14. İlyas Fırat ✗; 15. Esen Kale ✗; 16. Orhan Genç ✗; 17. İbrahim Bozsu ✗; 18. Zahide Şahan ✗; 19. Sülfıye Yıldırım ✗; 20. Sacide Göktaş ✗; 21. Emine Bilmece ✗; 22. Hülya Çelik ✗; 23. Hayriye Gümüş ✗; 24. Ayşegül Arıkan ✗; 25. Pervin Altug ✗; 26. İbrahim Erişkin ✗; 27. Yağmur Ören ✗; 28. Adnan Güçlü ✗; 29. Cumagülü Doğan ✗; 30. Ümit Kekeç ✗	1,297	0.04	▲0.04
LDP	None elected: 1. Hande Tibuk ✗; 2. Ali Külhan ✗; 3. Süleyman Sedat Sata ✗ l 4. Alp Pamir ✗; 5. Şenay Akyol ✗; 6. Metin Mintaz ✗; 7. Ali Tıraş ✗; 8. Fikri Çakır ✗; 9. Melek Banu Aktaç Memik ✗; 10. Çağdaş Bayındır ✗; 11. Emine Rana Belin ✗; 12. Hasan Erol ✗; 13. Hasan Tekin ✗; 14. Beyzat Berraksu ✗; 15. Kiyas Alhan ✗; 16. Mehmet Çağnat ✗; 17. Harun Koçin ✗; 18. Abdülkadir Alçep ✗; 19. Mehmet Ali Demirci ✗; 20. Ayça Dolgun ✗; 21. Meltem Emre ✗; 22. Ali Fahri Altuneli ✗; 23. Bora Yüce ✗; 24. Fisun Runa ✗; 25. Nadide Aydın ✗; 26. Murat Aydın ✗; 27. Mustafa Aypolat ✗; 28. Ziya Çelebi Sinça ✗; 29. Mümin Kuru ✗; 30. Recep Türkgeldi ✗	1,070	0.04	▼0.04
Labour	No candidates	0	0.00	0.00
Total votes		2,882,650	100.00	
Rejected ballots		59,281	2.02	▼2.95
Turnout		2,941,931	87.16	▲3.56
AK Party hold Majority		422,550	14.66	▲0.61
