= Istanbul (electoral districts) =

Electoral districts of the Grand National Assembly of Turkey

Coordinates: 41°10′N 28°45′E

- electoral district for the Grand National Assembly of Turkey
- Istanbul shown within Turkey
- Province: Istanbul
- Electorate: 10,559,686

Current electoral district
- Created: 1923
- Seats: 98
- Subdistricts: 1st district 2nd district 3rd district
- Representation
- AK Party: 43 / 98
- CHP: 27 / 98
- HDP: 12 / 98
- MHP: 8 / 98
- İYİ: 8 / 98

Istanbul is a Turkish province divided into three electoral districts of the Grand National Assembly of Turkey. It elects ninety-eight members of parliament (deputies) to represent the province of the same name for a five-year term by the D'Hondt method, a party-list proportional representation system.

The first district is situated on the Anatolian side of İstanbul on the east of the Bosphorus. The second and third electoral district are both on the European side, with the third situated to the west of the second. The first and third districts, electing 35 MPs, are the largest electoral districts of Turkey in terms of members elected.

== Members ==
Population reviews of each electoral district are conducted before each general election, which can lead to certain districts being granted a smaller or greater number of parliamentary seats. Istanbul has the largest number of allocated seats and also the largest number of electoral districts within its provincial boundaries.

The province's administrative districts (ilçe) are divided among three electoral districts as follows:

The three electoral districts of Istanbul First electoral district (30 MPs) Second electoral district (27 MPs) Third electoral district (28 MPs)

1st district	2nd district	3rd district
Adalar; Ataşehir; Beykoz; Çekmeköy; Kadıköy; Kartal; Maltepe; Pendik; Sancaktepe; Sultanbeyli; Şile; Tuzla; Ümraniye; Üsküdar	Bayrampaşa; Beşiktaş; Beyoğlu; Esenler; Eyüp; Fatih; Gaziosmanpaşa; Kağıthane; Sarıyer; Sultangazi; Şişli; Zeytinburnu	Arnavutköy; Avcılar; Bağcılar; Bahçelievler; Bakırköy; Başakşehir; Beylikdüzü; Büyükçekmece; Çatalca; Esenyurt; Güngören; Küçükçekmece; Silivri

== General elections ==
=== 2011 ===
General Election 2011: İstanbul
Party	Candidates standing				Votes			Seats won				
Party	1st	2nd	3rd	Total	Number	%	swing	1st	2nd	3rd	Total elected	change ±
AK Party	30	27	28	85	3,931,210	49.38	▲4.22	16	15	15	46 / 85	▲7
CHP	30	27	28	85	2,492,910	31.31	▲4.32	11	9	9	29 / 85	▲7
MHP	30	27	28	85	747,666	9.39	▼1.05	2	2	3	7 / 85	0
Independents	12	8	10	30	425,417	5.34	▼0.53	1	1	1	3 / 85	▲1
Felicity	30	27	28	85	129,030	1.62	▼1.41	0	0	0	0 / 85	0
HAS Party	30	27	28	85	57,399	0.72	▲0.72	0	0	0	0 / 85	0
BBP	30	27	28	85	50,023	0.63	▲0.63	0	0	0	0 / 85	0
Democrat	30	27	28	85	33,122	0.42	▼2.66	0	0	0	0 / 85	0
HEPAR	30	27	28	85	32,740	0.41	▲0.41	0	0	0	0 / 85	0
Democratic Left	30	27	28	85	19,489	0.24	N/A	0	0	0	0 / 85	0
Communist	30	27	28	85	16,626	0.21	▼0.01	0	0	0	0 / 85	0
Nation	30	27	28	85	14,831	0.19	▲0.19	0	0	0	0 / 85	0
Nationalist Conservative	30	27	28	85	4,321	0.05	▲0.05	0	0	0	0 / 85	0
Liberal Democrat	30	27	28	85	3,364	0.04	▼0.01	0	0	0	0 / 85	0
DYP	30	0	0	30	2,759	0.03	▲0.03	0	0	0	0 / 85	0
Labour	0	0	0	0	0	0.00	0.00	0	0	0	0 / 85	0
Total					7,960,907	100.00	Steady	30	27	28	85	▲15
Rejected ballots					175,733	2.17	▼2.86					
Turnout					8,112,340	86.32	▲4.33					
AK Party hold Majority					1,436,300	18.04	▼0.13					

=== June 2015 ===
Abbr.	Party	Votes	%
AK Party	Justice and Development Party	3,393,862	40.9%
CHP	Republican People's Party	2,440,167	29.4%
HDP	Peoples' Democratic Party	1,030,808	12.4%
MHP	Nationalist Movement Party	918,540	11.1%
SP	Felicity Party	177,713	2.1%
	Other	334,488	4%
Total		8,295,578	
Turnout		81.08	
source: YSK

=== November 2015 ===
Abbr.	Party	Votes	%
AK Party	Justice and Development Party	4,381,816	48.7%
CHP	Republican People's Party	2,736,490	30.4%
HDP	Peoples' Democratic Party	904,793	10.1%
MHP	Nationalist Movement Party	772,549	8.6%
SP	Felicity Party	67,935	0.8%
	Other	125,509	1.4%
Total		8,989,092	
Turnout		87.17	
source: YSK

=== 2018 ===
Abbr.	Party	Votes	%
AK Party	Justice and Development Party	3,821,773	41.7%
CHP	Republican People's Party	2,429,519	26.5%
HDP	Peoples' Democratic Party	1,146,449	12.5%
MHP	Nationalist Movement Party	745,268	8.1%
IYI	Good Party	738,171	8.1%
SP	Felicity Party	136,652	1.5%
	Other	137,286	1.5%
Total		9,155,118	
Turnout		86.70	
source: YSK

== Presidential elections ==
=== 2014 ===
Presidential Election 2014: İstanbul
Party	Candidate	Votes	%
AK Party	Recep Tayyip Erdoğan	3,568,047	49.83
Independent	Ekmeleddin İhsanoğlu	2,941,207	41.08
HDP	Selahattin Demirtaş	650,653	9.09
Total votes		7,159,907	100.00
Rejected ballots		104,409	1.44
Turnout		7,264,316	72.80
Recep Tayyip Erdoğan win			

=== 2018 ===
Presidential Election 2018: İstanbul
Party	Candidate	Votes	%
AK Party	Recep Tayyip Erdoğan	4,578,526	50.00
CHP	Muharrem İnce	3,378,032	36.89
HDP	Selahattin Demirtaş	661,774	7.23
İYİ	Meral Akşener	435,549	4.76
SAADET	Temel Karamollaoğlu	86,145	0.94
Patriotic	Doğu Perinçek	16,683	0.18
Total votes		9,156,889	100.00
Rejected ballots		147,731	1.59
Turnout		9,304,620	88.11
Recep Tayyip Erdoğan win			
