= Ahmet Mahmut Ünlü =

Turkish Islamic Scholar, imam and hafiz (born 1965)

Cübbeli Ahmet Hoca
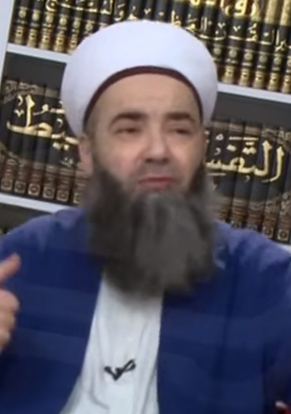

Personal life
- Born: Ahmet Mahmut Ünlü; 27 February 1965 (age 61) Çarşamba, Fatih, Istanbul, Turkey
- Parents: Yusuf Ünlü (father); Rabia Ünlü (mother)
- Main interest(s): Aqidah, Fiqh, Hadith, Sīrah, Sufism

Religious life
- Religion: Islam
- Denomination: Sunni
- Jurisprudence: Hanafi
- Tariqa: Naqshbandi
- Creed: Maturidi
- Movement: Müceddid Mahmut Efendi Hazretleri Cemaati

Muslim leader
- Disciple of: Mahmut Ustaosmanoğlu
- Influenced by: Muhammad al-Jazuli, Muhammad al-Bukhari, Ibn Arabi, Al-Hakim al-Tirmidhi, Abdul Qadir Gilani, Ahmad ibn Idris al-Fasi, Qadi Iyad, Ahmad al-Rifaʽi, Ahmad ibn Ajiba, Al-Ghazali, Hasan al-Basri, Abu Hanifa
- Influenced: İsmailağa
- Website: cubbeliahmethoca.com.tr

Ahmet Ünlü (born February 27, 1965), known colloquially as Cübbeli Ahmet Hocaefendi, is a Turkish Islamic Scholar and hafiz. He studied under Mahmut Ustaosmanoğlu. His controversial views are often reported by the Turkish press.

== Biography ==
Ahmet Mahmut Ünlü was born in Fatih, Istanbul, on 27 February 1965 to Yusuf Ünlü, a factory owner, and his wife Rabia. He claimed that his family is of Bukharan Turkic origin which settled in Görele in Giresun Province during the 1800s. In his childhood years, Ünlü was wearing a jubbah. He started his education when he was 3 years old. He preached in big mosques like Yavuz Selim while he was 14 years old. Ünlü is a diabetic and was therefore exempt from mandatory military service. He is married and has eight children.

He has been described as "Antisemitic", and has made many Antisemitic tropes.

Ünlü released a controversial fatwa in 2020, in which he stated that "Mustafa Kemal Atatürk is the founder of this state. This is not criticised, it is not permissible to criticise. This should never be criticised. The Republic is our last established state. Our duty to tax this state, our duty to go to the military, we depend on this state. Without this state, we would be worse than Syria and Yemen. Neither prayer remains, nor ablution remains, nor honor remains, nor chastity remains. The state must live."

Ünlü is a critic of Salafism, and frequently stated that Salafism is a threat and should not be allowed to grow in Turkey. Ünlü claimed that supporters of Salafism in Turkey owned guns and were a national security threat, and that the Salafism must be curbed. In 2020, Ünlü was involved in a feud with Murat Gezenler over his criticism of Salafism.

Ünlü is controversial due to his involvement in politics. During the 2023 Turkish elections, Ünlü showed his support to the Great Unity Party after Mustafa Destici visited him. Ünlü also called on people to support Recep Tayyip Erdoğan's Nation Alliance. Ünlü stated that HDP voters should have their Turkish citizenship revoked. Ünlü also criticised the Felicity Party many times. Ünlü caused more controversy in 2023, when he attempted to gaslight supporters of the Felicity Party with the Akhirah because they did not support Erdoğan. Birol Aydın, a Felicity Party spokesman, claimed that Ünlü did nothing but deceive people in the name of religion.

Ünlü had also reportedly insulted Hüseyin Velioğlu, and became a target among Kurdish Hezbollah supporters. The Kurdish Hezbollah also rejected the religious authenticity of Ünlü, and claimed that he was a fake scholar who works for the deep state. Ünlü criticised the Free Cause Party, which he claimed does not care for Turkey. After Serkan Ramanlı criticised the government for their removal of DEM politician Abdullah Zeydan from his elected post, Ünlü stated "our opinion on HÜDA PAR was also correct", and referred to the Free Cause Party as "terror lovers". Ünlü made Anti-Shia comments in 2022, which caused the Kurdish Hezbollah to condemn him as a "sectarian", and a Free Cause Party senior member to condemn him as an "American-Israeli agent". The Kurdish Hezbollah backed Abdulkadir Karaduman of the Felicity Party, and Alparslan Kuytul, during their conflicts with Ünlü.
