= Worldly Order Hearths =

Turkish ultranationalist and Islamist group

Worldly Order Hearths Foundation for Education and Culture (Nizâm-ı Âlem Ocakları Eğitim ve Kültür Vakfı)
- Founder: Remzi Çayır
- Leader: Ali Uysal
- Ideology: Turanism; Idealism; Pan-Turkism; Neo-Ottomanism; National conservatism
- Part of: National Path Party

The Worldly Order Hearths (Turkish: Nizâm-ı Âlem Ocakları) are a Turkish ultranationalist and Islamist group, which are the youth wing of the National Path Party.

== History ==
The Alperen Hearths, created in 1992 by Muhsin Yazıcıoğlu, were originally named the Worldly Order Hearths (Nizâm-ı Âlem Ocakları), although in 2000 they had changed their name to Alperen Hearths.

Remzi Çayır, who established the National Path Party (MYP) in 2021 after leaving the BBP, reestablished the Worldly Order Hearths as the youth wing of the MYP. Çayır left the BBP because of Destici's support for Erdoğan, and because he accused them and the Alperens of having shifted too far away from Yazıcıoğlu's ideology. The ideologies of the MYP and Worldly Order Hearths are virtually the same as those of the BBP and Alperens, except for the Erdoğan dispute. The Worldly Order Hearths and the MYP grew quickly and opened offices in many cities in Turkey.

The Worldly Order Hearths often accompany the MYP in speeches and rallies, and also carry out activities in support of the MYP.
