= Anti-Erdoğanism =

Rejection and opposition of Erdoğanism

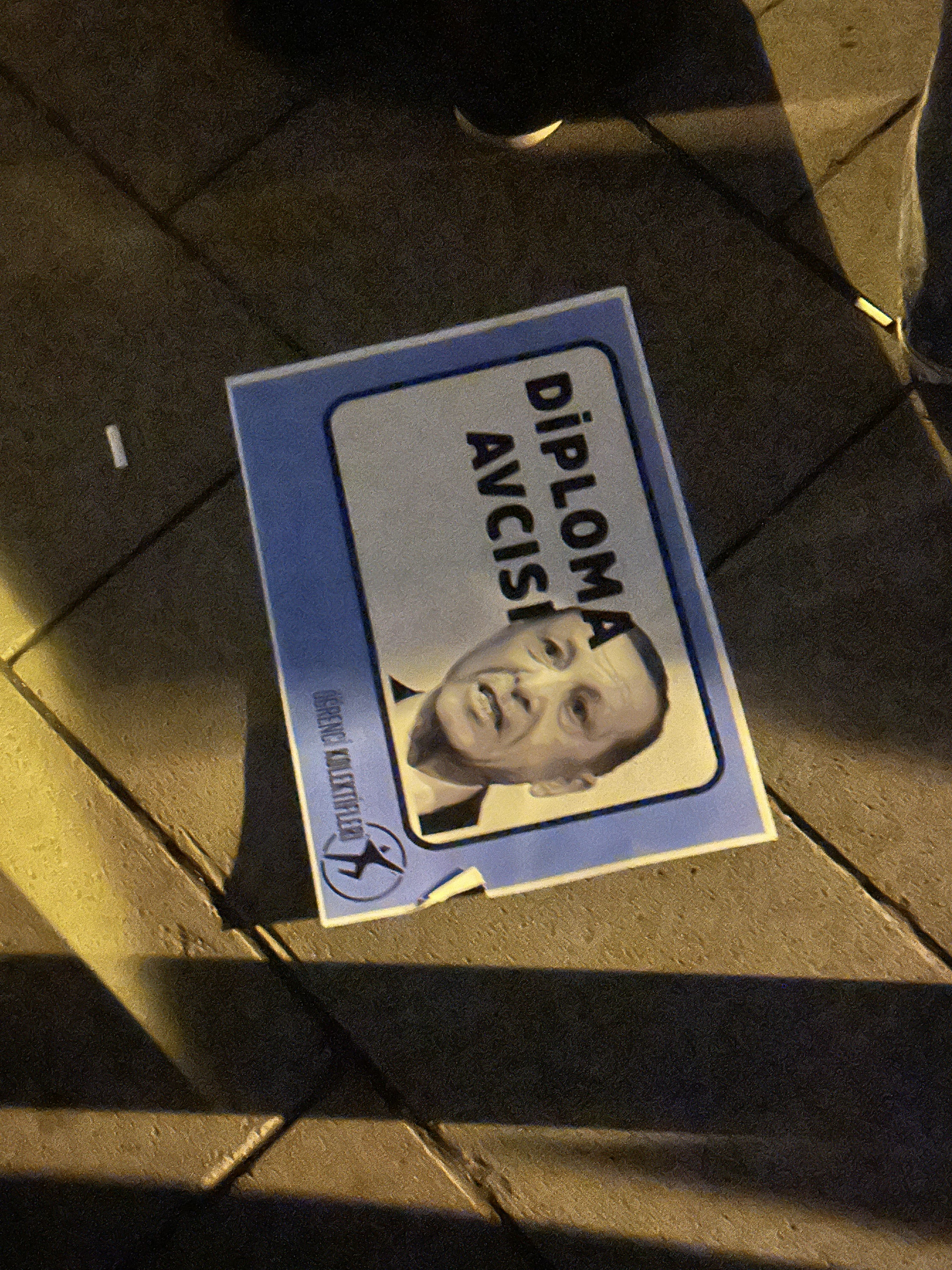
Anti-Erdoğan poster reading "Diploma Hunter" in Turkish

Anti-Erdoğanism is a political movement in opposition to Erdoğanism, Recep Tayyip Erdoğan, and Erdoğanists. Anti-Erdoğanism has a presence in every Turkish political faction, ranging from the far-left to the far-right, as well as from liberals and socialists to conservatives, nationalists, and Islamists.

== History ==
Some anti-Erdoğanists accused Erdoğan and his AKP of being Neo-Ottomanists, likening it to Putinism. Since 2015, critics have accused Erdoğanism of being a fascist ideology.

Despite many criticising Erdoğan due to the perception of him being an Islamist, most Islamists criticise Erdoğan and his rule, as well as Erdoğanists due to them being an extreme cult of personality. The Felicity Party is among the fiercest anti-Erdoğanist parties in Turkey, which claims that Erdoğan is only an opportunist who uses religious rhetoric to maintain popular support.

Although Erdoğan had initially improved the rights of Kurds in Turkey, he began to lose more and more Kurdish support starting in 2015 because of his alliance with the MHP. Erdoğan often baselessly accuses Kurds who criticise his policies of being PKK supporters, which further disillusions the ones who do not support the PKK. Even conservative Kurds, of whom many were once staunch Erdoğan supporters, had ceased their support due to his increasing nationalism. During the 2023 elections, when Erdoğan pushed a very strong nationalist rhetoric, the majority of Kurds did not vote for him, and many conservative Kurds were repulsed by his nationalism to the point they viewed the opposition as a better alternative. Many Kurds denied that Erdoğan was an Islamist, and claimed that he was a mere "Green Kemalist".

Abdullah Gül and Ahmet Davutoğlu became anti-Erdoğanists due to the increasing nationalism of Erdoğan.

The National Path Party was founded in 2021 by BBP politicians and Alperen Hearths who were repulsed by Erdoğan. The party has no major ideological difference with the BBP except for the dispute about Erdoğan. Remzi Çayır had also claimed that Muhsin Yazıcıoğlu and Alparslan Türkeş would have been very disappointed seeing Idealists who support Erdoğan.

The Islamic State rebuffs Erdoğan as a "taghut", and his supporters as "kuffar". In the 4th edition of Rumiyah, the Islamic State called on people to "ask Allah for help and attack Turkey" and to "stab those who support the AKP".

Alparslan Kuytul, a Salafi cleric, is a staunch critic of Erdoğan. Kuytul advocated for a Sharia system and also believed that Erdoğan is a taghut. Kuytul refers to the AKP as ZKP (Oppressive Development Party).

== See also ==
- Gezi Park protests
- 2021 Boğaziçi University protests
- 2025 Turkish protests
