= Free Cause Party–People's Alliance relations =

The Free Cause Party–People's Alliance relations refer to the relations between the Free Cause Party (HÜDA PAR) and the People's Alliance (CUMHUR), which have been a topic of controversy.

== History ==
Hüseyin Yılmaz of HÜDA PAR in 2021 criticised the ruling AKP-MHP coalition for its unwillingness to give Kurds equality, with Yılmaz claiming that it was all it took for the PKK to cease its operations. The People's Alliance staunchly supported the closure of the HDP, while HÜDA PAR was against its closure. HÜDA PAR also expressed its willingness for an alliance with the HDP. However, HÜDA PAR accused the HDP of being intolerant and adamant on being the sole representative of Kurds, which was a factor of their failure to establish an alliance.

During the 2023 Turkish presidential election, HÜDA PAR announced its support for the People's Alliance. It sparked a controversy due to the ideologies and goals of HÜDA PAR being conflicting with those of MHP and BBP, and even AKP. While HÜDA PAR advocates for Kurdish language official status, the AKP tolerated using languages other than Turkish but opposed official status, and the MHP and BBP claimed that only Turkish should be used and recognised. HÜDA PAR claimed that some of the constitution should be changed and that non-Turks should receive legal recognition, while MHP and BBP claim that every citizen is a Turk and opposed changing the constitution. HÜDA PAR also advocated for federalising Turkey, while the MHP supported maintaining the unitary state of the AKP rule, and the BBP supported increased local governance while maintaining the unitary state.

Celal Adan of MHP in April 2023 stated that "HÜDA PAR has nothing to do with the People's Alliance. HÜDA PAR's candidates are parliamentary candidates from the AK Party, not in the alliance. Nothing comes out of here from us. We will neither meet nor be together with HÜDA PAR." Serkan Ramanlı responded by criticising MHP and claiming that DEM was the only party that HÜDA PAR should have made an alliance with. Bülent Turan of AKP also stated "HÜDA PAR is a separate party. We made an alliance, the People's Alliance. We made the alliance with Erdoğan, Bahçeli, Destici and Erbakan. We have no alliance with HÜDA PAR. HÜDA PAR simply decided to support Erdogan." HÜDA PAR had its members compete under the AKP list, as it was not a member of the alliance. Fatih Erbakan later rejected the YRP joining the alliance, making the alliance officially composed of only AKP, MHP, and BBP.

In April 2023, Zekeriya Yapıcıoğlu sparked controversy by stating that the constitution of Turkey should be changed, and that the name of the Turkish flag should be changed as well. He again sparked controversy in May for refusing to call it the "Turkish flag". Tuğrul Türkeş stated "if he has the right to be offended by that flag, my right to be offended by HÜDA PAR and its chairman is a democratic right." Mustafa Destici had also criticised the thoughts of HÜDA PAR, and claimed that Hezbollah was a terrorist organisation. Destici also criticised a HÜDA PAR statement which advocated for regionalism.

In March, Devlet Bahçeli broke his silence on HÜDA PAR, and claimed that HÜDA PAR had no relation to Hezbollah and "completely rejected terrorism." However, Yapıcıoğlu later sparked controversy during an interview in May, after being asked "is Hezbollah a terrorist organization?", he replied "no, you call them terrorist organisations, I call them PKK and Hezbollah." Doğu Perinçek criticised Bahçeli for his statement, and said "is this nationalism? Is there a Turkish nationalist who is united with those who want to remove the Turkish concept?".

Perinçek criticised the People's Alliance for tolerating HÜDA PAR, stating "currently, the People's Alliance is busy using all its abilities polishing the separatist HÜDA PAR. AK Party, MHP and BBP spokespersons tried to justify their cooperation with HÜDA PAR, which prides itself on being followers of Sheikh Said and Seyid Riza, wants to remove the concept of the Turkish Nation from the constitution, and aims to make Kurdish an official language. As if the PKK in the parliament under the auspices of the Nation Alliance was not enough, now the People's Alliance has also come under the task of moving HÜDA PAR separatism to the Parliament." Sinan Oğan criticised HÜDA PAR, stating that "HÜDA PAR, which was added to the People's Alliance, wants to establish a green Kurdistan in Turkey. HDP, which was added to the Nation Alliance, wants a red Kurdistan in Turkey." Perinçek made similar a statement, saying "we will see HDP and HÜDA PAR joining hands in the Parliament for Kurdistan separatism. Their programs are the same." Oğan and Perinçek later supported the People's Alliance, despite the disputes over HÜDA PAR.

Also in April 2023, the MHP did not send an Eid greeting to HÜDA PAR, although they sent one to even the CHP. Later, Devlet Bahçeli and Yapıcıoğlu were both invited to the Akkuyu Nuclear Power Plant opening ceremony, although Bahçeli refused to be in the same photo with Yapıcıoğlu, causing Yapıcıoğlu to not come to the ceremony.

During the 2024 elections, Yapıcıoğlu expressed that he saw the AKP as an opponent of HÜDA PAR, and he stated that he supported the People's Alliance in 2023 only because the CHP was planning to "Turkify" Kurds and continue denying their existence if they won the election.

In January 2023, Ümit Özdağ stated "we know that the People's Alliance accuses the Nation Alliance of cooperating with the HDP. They are not wrong at all in this accusation. Now, here we ask the leaders of the People's Alliance, how is HÜDA PAR any different from the HDP? What is the difference between their programs? Don't they both want to divide this country? Doesn't the one who is named 'HÜDAPAR' want a federation? Doesn't it want separatism? Are the HDP's hands bloody, all the while HÜDA PAR's hands smell like cologne? Doesn't HÜDA PAR carry the great weight of Hezbollah murders and massacres on its back? In summary; both alliances are in open-closed cooperation with the separatists. Those who do not cooperate with the separatists; it is the Victory Party. We do not cooperate with HÜDA PAR in order to get two votes like the People's Alliance, nor do we do six somersaults to get the HDP's vote like the Nation Alliance. We, as Turkish nationalists who carry the spirit of the War of Independence, as Turkish nationalists fighting along the line of Atatürk, will never ever compromise our national state, our Turkish identity in our constitution." Later in March, the Victory Party applied to the Court of Cassation to close HÜDA PAR.
