= National Path Party =

Political party in Turkey

National Path Party Milli Yol Partisi
- Abbreviation: MİLLİ YOL
- Leader: Remzi Çayır
- General Secretary: Şeref Canlı
- Spokesperson: Ali Saraçoğlu
- Founder: Remzi Çayır
- Founded: December 14, 2021
- Split from: Great Unity Party
- Headquarters: Ankara
- Youth wing: Worldly Order Hearths
- Membership (2026): ▲6,986
- Ideology: Turkish nationalism Turkish–Islamic synthesis Idealism; Pan-Turkism; Islamokemalism; Anti-Erdoğanism
- Political position: Far-right
- Colors: Red White
- Municipal Assemblies: 1 / 20,953

Website
- https://www.milliyolpartisi.org.tr/

The National Path Party (Turkish: Milli Yol Partisi; MİLLİ YOL) is a Turkish nationalist and national conservative political party in Turkey. A group within the Great Unity Party, dissatisfied with the party's leadership and its support for the People's Alliance, split from the party and founded the National Path Party with 191 founding members. Having completed its nationwide organization, the National Path Party participated in the election held on May 14, 2023. Its chairman is Remzi Çayır.

== History ==
On December 14, 2021, the party was founded by Remzi Çayır, who was joined by 191 other BBP politicians who were opposed to Recep Tayyip Erdoğan. Many Alperen Hearths also left the BBP and joined this party. The party does not have any major ideological differences with the BBP except for their dispute about Erdoğan. In a 2021 speech, Çayır accused the BBP of having shifted too far away from Muhsin Yazıcıoğlu's views and ideals.

Çayır, in a speech, claimed that the National Path Party is the only party which followed in the footsteps of Mustafa Kemal Atatürk, and that Muhsin Yazıcıoğlu and Alparslan Türkeş would have both been disappointed in the Idealists who support Erdoğan.

The party advocates for a return to the parliamentary system which Erdoğan had abolished in 2017 for the presidential system. They also advocate for the complete separation of the Judicial, Legislative, and the Executive branches.

The party supported Mansur Yavaş in the 2024 Ankara mayoral election, as part of the 2024 Turkish local elections.

Remzi Çayır spoke at the party's introductory meeting of mayoral candidates at a hotel in Ankara. He stated that "this movement is the spirit of the War of Independence that burns the torch of independence, it is the soul of Mustafa Kemal Atatürk, this movement; this nation is the party of the nationalists, idealists, and the oppressed who emerged so that there is no outcast or minority in its own land and homeland. This move is Muhsin Yazıcıoğlu. This movement is Ahmet Yesevi. This movement is İmam-ı Âzam. When the last word is said in the narrow tree of this movement, my last word is this; this is the path of Mustafa Pehlivanoğlu, who says, 'let there be nationalism, may the homeland live, thanks to Islam'. We reject those who stand next to Tayyip Erdoğan; we call you to the National Path. Yes, you have a home. Muhsin Yazıcıoğlu has a way. Alparslan Türkeş is also here with us. Real idealists can change. We will change the political institution first. The National Path Party should not be seen as a political party. This movement is a movement and will change the system in Turkey with the permission of Allah."
