= 2023 Adana attack =

Knife attack targeting the Free Cause Party

The 2023 Adana attack was a knife attack at the Adana provincial headquarters of the Free Cause Party (HüdaPar), located in Seyhan, Turkey. Salih Demir, the president of HüdaPar's Adana wing, was injured, and his secretary Sacit Pişgin lost his life.

== Background ==
The Free Cause Party was the target of much attacks and controversy around the time of the 2023 Turkish general election, due to it being a Kurdish and an Islamist party. During that time, a group of people gathered around the HüdaPar provincial headquarters in Gaziantep and flashed the Wolf salute whilst yelling provocative phrases. Around the same time in Antalya, a group known as the Turan Academy of Sciences gathered around the HüdaPar provincial building and also flashed wolf salutes while flying nationalist flags. Also around that time, HüdaPar members who worked at street stands were physically attacked in Trabzon. Zekeriya Yapıcıoğlu blamed that attack on Ümit Özdağ, the leader of the Victory Party, and said that the attack was caused by Özdağ's constant propaganda against HüdaPar. Yapıcıoğlu also announced that HüdaPar had filed criminal complaints against Özdağ to Turkey's Human Rights and Legal Affairs Presidency.

== Attack ==
The incident occurred on July 22, 2023, at around 5pm. The attacker, wielding a knife, entered the building and injured Salih Demir, and killed Sacit Pişgin, while they were praying. He fled the scene and police and medical teams were dispatched to the building upon notice. The two victims were both taken to the hospital. The suspect was detained by the police.

The provincial government of Adana, who made a statement after the incident, announced that the suspect was caught. Although HüdaPar announced that the attackers were two people, the governor's office announced that one person was caught and said "A.S., born in Adana in 1951, was detained by our security forces. The judicial investigation into the incident continues".

== Reactions ==
Zekeriya Yapıcıoğlu: "Inna Lillahi wa inna ilayhi raji'un. Our brother Sacid Pişgin, the Adana Provincial Secretary, who was attacked while performing prayer, has become a martyr, and our brother Salih Demir, the Provincial Chairman, is still under treatment. May Allah's mercy be upon our martyr. May curse be upon the murderer, or murderers, and the forces behind this heinous attack that target our party and our brothers. I pray for a swift recovery for our injured brother." He also referred to it as one of "many fascist attacks" that have been committed against HüdaPar around that time.

Kurdistan Freedom Party: "We condemn this attack. The perpetrators must be found immediately and all aspects of the incident should be clarified. We wish God's mercy on Sacit Pişgin, who lost his life in the attack, and our condolences to his family, fans and the entire HÜDA PAR community. We wish a speedy recovery to Mr. Salih Demir."

Ömer Faruk Gergerlioğlu: "I curse the attack, I wish God's mercy on the deceased who passed away, and patience to his relatives. An attack on a democratic representation is unacceptable.

Ali Yerlikaya: "The person who carried out the attack was caught and detained. The judicial investigation into the incident continues."

Ömer Çelik: "Politically-motivated violence will be addressed; the incident will be enlightened in every aspect."
