= Kürşat Mican =

Turkish politician (born 1982)

- Born: 1 March 1982 (age 44); Eynesil, Giresun, Turkey
- Occupations: Politician, author
- Years active: 2000–present

Kürşat Mican (born 1 March 1982) is a Turkish politician and author. He has been a member of the Great Unity Party since 2000.

== Biography ==
Mican was born on 1 March 1982 in Eynesil, Giresun, Turkey. He moved to Istanbul with his family at a young age. Mican studied in Istanbul and became the manager at Mican Group, the family's company. Since 2000 he is a member of the Great Unity Party. In 2018 he established the Yesevi Alperenler Association (Yesevi Alperenler Derneğini kurdu), an educational institution. He participated as a helper in many war zones, especially Syria and Iraq, where he helped for 8 years.

Mican is the founding president of Alpkurt (Alperen Arama Kurtarma). He is Istanbul's Provincial President of Alperen Hearths.

In 2017 he was tried with a prison sentence of up to 6 years for "inciting people to hatred and hostility or humiliating" and fined 4 thousand liras for threats he pronounced against the participants of the LGBT Pride Week.

In the night of 8 March 2018, the car on which he and his brother were riding was subject to a gun attack in Sultanbeyli. About ten bullets hit the car but Mican and his brother escaped unharmed. In 2023 he protested the burning of the Quran in Sweden, calling for a boycott of "all products of other European states, especially Sweden".

In 2020, he published the book Şehit Lider Muhsin Başkan ve Davası, which is about the late BBP leader Muhsin Yazıcıoğlu.

== Major works ==
- Şehit Lider Muhsin Başkan ve Davası, 368 pp., Bilgeoğuz
