= 2009 Medair Bell 206 crash =

Aviation accident in Turkey

2009 Medair TC-HEK helicopter crash
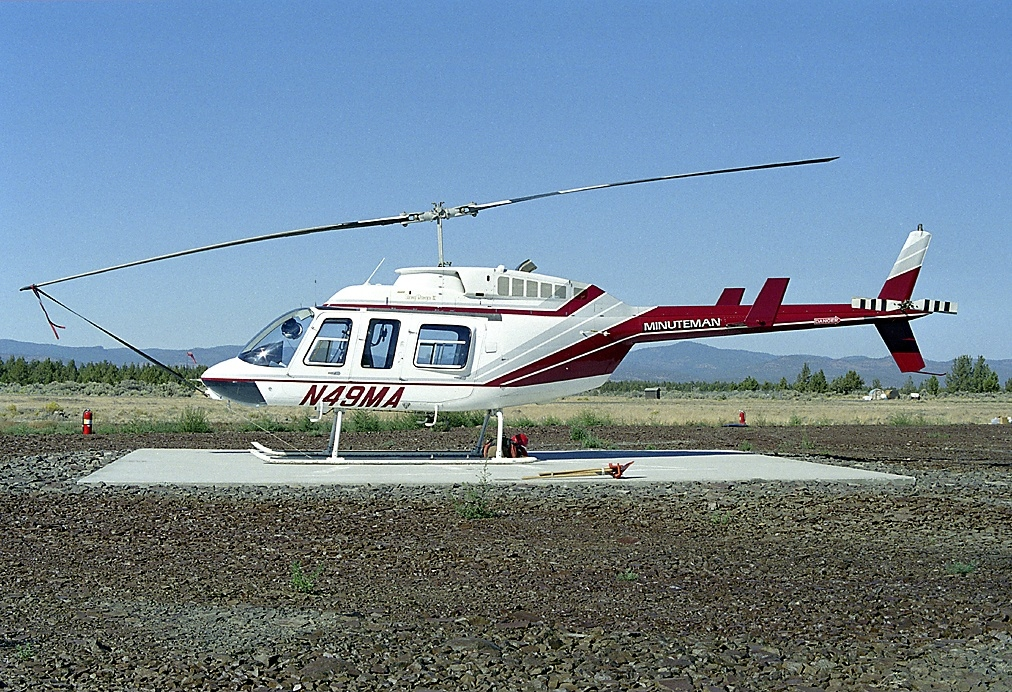
- A Bell 206L-4 LongRanger similar to the one involved in the incident.

Accident
- Date: March 25, 2009
- Summary: Controlled flight into terrain
- Site: Mount Keş, Göksun Kahramanmaraş, Turkey; 37°52′12″N 36°40′12″E

Aircraft
- Aircraft type: Bell 206L-4 LongRanger
- Operator: Medair
- Registration: TC-HEK
- Flight origin: Sivas
- Stopover: Çağlayancerit, Kahramanmaraş
- Destination: Yerköy, Yozgat
- Occupants: 6
- Passengers: 5
- Crew: 1
- Fatalities: 6
- Survivors: 0

A Bell 206L-4 LongRanger helicopter, tail number TC-HEK, operated by Medair while on a charter flight en route from Çağlayancerit in Kahramanmaraş Province to Yerköy in Yozgat Province, crashed on March 25, 2009, at around 16:00 EET (14:00 UTC) when it struck Mount Keş in central Turkey. The pilot and four passengers, including the leader of the Great Union Party (BBP) Muhsin Yazıcıoğlu, were killed in the accident. Only one passenger survived the crash with injuries and made an emergency call. Due to harsh weather conditions at the crash site, the victims and the wreckage could be recovered only after two days, and the injured passenger was found dead under snow five days later.

== Flight history ==
The helicopter was chartered by the local leaders of a minor political party, the Great Unity Party (Turkish: Büyük Birlik Partisi), to enable their party leader Muhsin Yazıcıoğlu to attend political rallies held on the same day in neighboring provinces as part of the campaign for the 2009 local elections. Accompanied by his party's three local leaders from Sivas Province and a news agency reporter, Yazıcıoğlu arrived in Çağlayancerit on March 25, 2009, at 13:00 EET (11:00 UCT) by helicopter, to make a speech. He told the crowd of 1,500 people gathered in the town square that it was the first time his party had chartered a helicopter, and this without any financial support from the state treasury.

As the rally in Çağlayancerit was going on, the helicopter was refueled at 13:30 local time at the Kahramanmaraş Airport. Piloted by Kaya İstektepe and carrying five passengers, it then lifted off at 14:42 to head for Yerköy, where Yazıcıoğlu had his next speech scheduled at 17:00. The helicopter did not arrive, and the crowd of 3,000 people gathered in the Station Square (Turkish: İstasyon Meydanı) in Yerköy became worried. A short time later, the deputy leader of the BBP made the announcement that the helicopter carrying Yazıcıoğlu and his party members was missing.

== Aircraft ==
The helicopter, a Bell 206L-4 LongRanger with tail number TC-HEK, was produced in 1999. In 2008, it joined the fleet of Medair, a subsidiary company of Esas Holding based in Istanbul. The aircraft had seven-seat capacity for five passengers in addition to two pilots. Powered by one Allison 250-C30P engine, it could remain airborne for two-and-half hours with a maximum range of 508 km (274 nmi) and a maximum speed of 234 km/h (145 mph).

== Crash and rescue operation ==
Location of the flight route

As no direct contact with the helicopter could be established, search activities were initiated. At 16:10 local time one of the passengers, İsmail Güneş, a reporter for the Ihlas News Agency from Sivas, called the 112 emergency service from his mobile phone and said that "the helicopter he was onboard had crashed, he was injured with a broken leg and no one else, as he could see, had survived." After he added that "the battery of his mobile was running out, and he was about to die," then his phone went silent. He was unable to give any further information about the location of the crash site.

In order to locate the crash site, the GSM operator providing Güneş's mobile phone service was contacted. The calculated geographical coordinates determined the crash site was Mount Berit in the vicinity of Hacıömer and Sisne villages, around 20 km (12 mi) northeast of the town of Göksun in Kahramanmaraş Province. At 17:00 hours, search and rescue (SAR) teams were deployed on land and by air. Minister of Transport Binali Yıldırım said that "the rescuers were receiving signals from the mobile phones in the accident area, and they are trying to locate whereabouts of the crash."

State emergency management officials reported that two military special operations teams of the natural disaster rescue battalion (12 personnel each), civil defense SAR teams from Kahramanmaraş (129 personnel, 17 vehicles) and Adana (27 personnel, 8 vehicles and a SAR dog), a gendarmerie unit consisting of 345 personnel, 897 village guards and 60 volunteers of a disaster assistance and rescue team (Turkish: AKUT) headed for the crash site on land, while two military Sikorsky helicopters equipped with night vision devices, one CASA aircraft of the Turkish Air Force, one police H-60 and one air ambulance helicopter joined the search efforts by air.

Teams of the gendarmerie and the Turkish Road Administration were engaged in opening roadways in the mountainous area under harsh weather conditions, where the temperature fell to −5 °C (23 °F) after midnight. The search operation in the region, at an elevation of around 2,000 m (6,600 ft), was hampered by fog, snowstorms and 2 m (6.6 ft) of snow on the ground.

The search efforts, concentrated around Kurucaova village and the foothills of Mount Kaman during the night, were suspended at 04:00 local time, but resumed at 05:30 hours with the sunrise. At around 06:00, the search teams found a group of 22 volunteers in danger of freezing and rescued them.

Minister of Interior Beşir Atalay rushed to the region and set up headquarters in the nearby village of Kızılöz to coordinate the SAR activities. Prime Minister Recep Tayyip Erdoğan also traveled to Kahramanmaraş to monitor the SAR activities.

== Recovery ==
47 hours after the crash, on March 27, a group of 17 volunteers and village guards from the villages of Kurucuova and Döngel southeast of Göksun discovered the wreckage amid a snowstorm as they were returning home from a search. The crash site was situated close to the snow-covered summit of Mount Keş in the region of Sisne and Elmalı, about four walking hours from Döngel village. The area was not within the official search zone.

The villagers called the authorities by phone from the crash site and stated that, "they found five victims dead, two of them inside the helicopter's wreckage. They were unable to identify Yazıcıoğlu since the corpses were frozen beyond recognition. The aircraft's fuselage was broken into pieces while the tail was almost intact. They searched for the sixth victim around the wreckage without success." They added that "the crash site was located in an inaccessible area and could better be reached by means of helicopter."

Officials redirected the rescuers to the area where the wreckage was found. The next day, now three days after the crash, rescue teams reached the bodies of the five victims: pilot Kaya İstektepe, BBP leader Muhsin Yazıcıoğlu, BBP chairman of Sivas Province Erhan Üstündağ, his deputy Yüksel Yağcı, and Sivas city council candidate Murat Çetinkaya, and transported them by helicopters to the State Hospital in Kahramanmaraş. The search for the sixth passenger continued, but with little hope of finding him alive.

During the SAR operation, a Sikorsky military helicopter made an emergency landing in the region due to bad weather conditions and became stuck in snow. There were no casualties in the accident.

Special operations SAR teams of the gendarmerie finally recovered the body of the 34-year-old reporter İsmail Güneş on March 30, five days after the accident, covered by snow between two rocks around 500 metres (1,600 ft) east of the crash site. He had eventually freed himself from the wreckage, where his foot had been wedged, and slid downhill with the help of a seat from the aircraft to seek shelter under a tree beside a rock at Karayakup hill. Güneş's corpse was flown to the State Hospital in Kahramanmaraş, where four forensic experts from Adana conducted an autopsy and found that he had broken his left ankle and two ribs, and the reason for his death was exposure to cold weather.

== Investigation ==
An investigation team of the Turkish Civil Aviation Authority (Turkish: Sivil Havacılık Genel Müdürlüğü) stated that the crashed helicopter was equipped with an emergency locater transmitter (ELT), contrary to claims that the aircraft lacked one or that it was not functioning. The ELT was not able to send sufficiently strong signals because its antenna had been broken in the crash. The CEO of the holding company affiliated with Medair, Ali Sabancı, said that the helicopter was regularly maintained and the ELT device was installed one week before the accident.

The investigation team revealed as its first findings that the helicopter, while cruising at an altitude of about 1,000-1,500 ft (300–460 m), hit the mountain because of bad weather conditions and fog. The fuselage broke into pieces, and some of the parts spread over an area up to 50 metres (160 ft) from the impact point.

In later statements regarding the ongoing legal process, lawyer Ekici noted that the investigation had been reopened to examine several unresolved issues, including earlier findings on carbon monoxide levels and newly requested analyses of regional air traffic. Ekici stated that the Kahramanmaraş Chief Public Prosecutor's Office had accepted their request to reassess claims concerning three jets reported to have been present in the area at the time of the crash, and to determine whether these aircraft could have played a role in downing the helicopter carrying Yazıcıoğlu and his companions. He emphasized that a new report on air movements (“hava hareketliliği”) was being prepared as part of this expanded review, expressing hope that the forthcoming documents would support their contention that Yazıcıoğlu and the others had been deliberately killed. Ekici reiterated that the legal team, the family, and Yazıcıoğlu's supporters intended to pursue the case to its conclusion.

== Aftermath ==
Out of respect for the BBP leader Yazıcıoğlu's death, all the political parties cancelled their rallies ahead of the local elections.

After the local elections of March 29, the BBP unexpectedly won the seat of mayor in Sivas Province.

In a press conference, Prime Minister Recep Tayyip Erdoğan expressed his appreciation to the rescue teams for their efforts despite adverse weather conditions at the crash site, and announced initiation of an official investigation into a possible failure of the authorities regarding the length of time the SAR operation had taken.
