= 2023 Turkish general election =

- 14 May 2023
- Opinion polls
- Presidential election
- 14 May 2023 (first round); 28 May 2023 (second round)
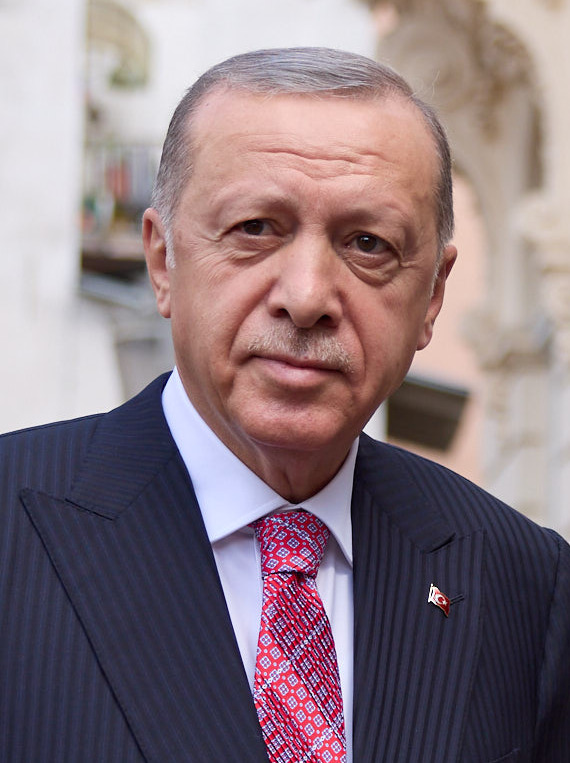

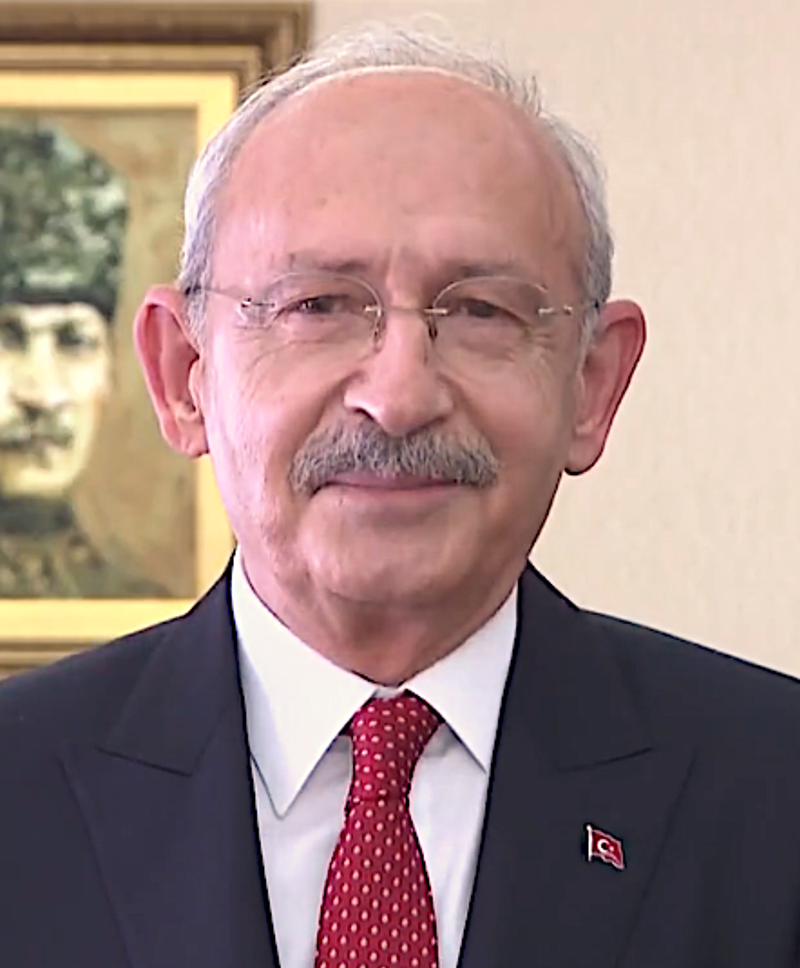
Nominee	Recep Tayyip Erdoğan	Kemal Kılıçdaroğlu
Party	AK Party	CHP
Alliance	People's Alliance	Nation Alliance
Popular vote	27,834,589	25,504,704
Percentage	52.18%	47.82%
President before election
Recep Tayyip Erdoğan
AK Party
Elected President
Recep Tayyip Erdoğan
AK Party
- Parliamentary election
- 14 May 2023
Party	Leader	Vote %	Seats	+/–
AK Party	Recep Tayyip Erdoğan	35.61	268	−27
CHP	Kemal Kılıçdaroğlu	25.33	169	+23
YSGP	Çiğdem Kılıçgün Uçar, İbrahim Akın	8.81	61	−6
MHP	Devlet Bahçeli	10.07	50	+1
İYİ	Meral Akşener	9.69	43	0
YRP	Fatih Erbakan	2.82	5	+5
TİP	Erkan Baş	1.73	4	+4
This lists parties that won seats. See the complete results below.

Parliament diagram

General elections were held in Turkey on 14 May 2023, combining presidential elections and parliamentary elections to elect 600 members of the Grand National Assembly.

Election monitors criticized the conduct of the elections, observing restrictions on fundamental freedoms of assembly, association and expression. There was political interference in the electoral process, threats of throttling social media platforms, arrests of people posting criticisms on social media, and fines against media organizations that criticized the government. The state-run media heavily favored the AK Party, led by incumbent president Recep Tayyip Erdoğan. Popular political opponents were jailed or intimidated during the election campaign. A 2023 study in PLOS One found that the election was "riddled with statistical irregularities, that may be indicative of electoral fraud."

== Background ==
The previous Turkish general election took place in 2018. The election marked the country's transition from a parliamentary system to a presidential one, as narrowly endorsed by voters in the 2017 constitutional referendum. That election resulted in a victory for incumbent president Recep Tayyip Erdoğan, who had held the position since 2014.

Meanwhile, the ruling Justice and Development Party (AK Party) lost its absolute majority in the Grand National Assembly of Turkey for the first time since June 2015, forcing it to rely on its coalition partner, the Nationalist Movement Party (MHP) of Devlet Bahçeli, to pass legislation. The office of the Prime Minister of Turkey was abolished on 12 July 2018, and its last holder, Binali Yıldırım, took office as the Speaker of the Grand National Assembly.

Although there were speculations about a snap election prior to the regular one in 2023, Bahçeli ruled them out. In a written statement, he said that elections would not be held before 2023. He also confirmed that the current coalition between AK Party and MHP will remain intact and Erdoğan will be their joint nominee for president. On 9 June 2022, Erdoğan declared his candidacy.

On 22 January 2023, Erdoğan announced he would initiate snap elections on 10 March which would bring the election date forward from 18 June to 14 May. Muharrem İnce announced he would withdraw his candidacy on 11 May.

== Presidential election ==
=== Candidates ===
On 1 April, after a drawing conducted by the Supreme Electoral Council, the places of four presidential candidates on the ballot paper have been determined as follows:

List of presidential candidates in order they appear on the ballot paper
1	2	3	4
Recep Tayyip Erdoğan	Muharrem İnce (Note: İnce withdrew his candidacy on 11 May 2023, but remained on the ballot)	Kemal Kılıçdaroğlu	Sinan Oğan
Campaign	Campaign	Campaign	Campaign

== Parliamentary election ==
=== Contesting parties ===
The table below shows the places of alliances, parties, and independent candidates in the order they will appear on the ballot paper:

List	Party		Chairperson(s)	Main ideology	Alliance
1	Nation Party	MİLLET	Cuma Nacar	Conservatism	—N/a
2	Rights and Freedoms Party	HAK-PAR	Düzgün Kaplan	Kurdish nationalism	—N/a
3	Communist Party of Turkey	TKP	Kemal Okuyan	Communism	Union of Socialist Forces
4	Communist Movement of Turkey	TKH	Aysel Tekerek	Communism	Union of Socialist Forces
5	Left Party	SOL PARTİ	Önder İşleyen	Socialism	Union of Socialist Forces
6	Young Party	GENÇPARTİ	Murat Hakan Uzan	Kemalism	—N/a
7	Homeland Party	MEMLEKET	Muharrem İnce	Kemalism	—N/a
8	Great Unity Party	BÜYÜK BİRLİK	Mustafa Destici	Turkish Islamonationalism	People's Alliance
9	Justice and Development Party	AK PARTİ	Recep Tayyip Erdoğan	Erdoğanism	People's Alliance
10	New Welfare Party	YENİDEN REFAH	Fatih Erbakan	Millî Görüş	People's Alliance
11	Nationalist Movement Party	MHP	Devlet Bahçeli	Ultranationalism	People's Alliance
12	Party of Greens and the Left Future	YEŞİL SOL PARTİ	İbrahim Akın, Çiğdem Kılıçgün Uçar	Green politics	Labour and Freedom Alliance
13	Workers' Party of Turkey	TİP	Erkan Baş	Communism	Labour and Freedom Alliance
14	Justice Unity Party	AB PARTİ	İrfan Uzun	Nationalism	—N/a
15	Motherland Party	ANAP	İbrahim Çelebi	Liberal conservatism	—N/a
16	Innovation Party	YP	Öztürk Yılmaz	Kemalism	—N/a
17	People's Liberation Party	HKP	Nurullah Efe	Communism	—N/a
18	National Path Party	MİLLİ YOL	Remzi Çayır	National conservatism	—N/a
19	Patriotic Party	VATAN PARTİSİ	Doğu Perinçek	Ulusalcılık	—N/a
20	Power Union Party	GBP	Ali Karnap	Conservatism	—N/a
21	Republican People's Party	CHP	Kemal Kılıçdaroğlu	Kemalism	Nation Alliance
22	Good Party	İYİ PARTİ	Meral Akşener	Kemalism	Nation Alliance
23	Justice Party	AP	Vecdet Öz	Liberal conservatism	Ancestral Alliance
24	Victory Party	—N/a	Ümit Özdağ	Anti-immigration	Ancestral Alliance
25	Independent candidates				

== See also ==
- List of elections in 2023
- Opinion polling for the 2023 Turkish general election
