= Kâhta =

City in Adıyaman Province, Turkey

- Municipality
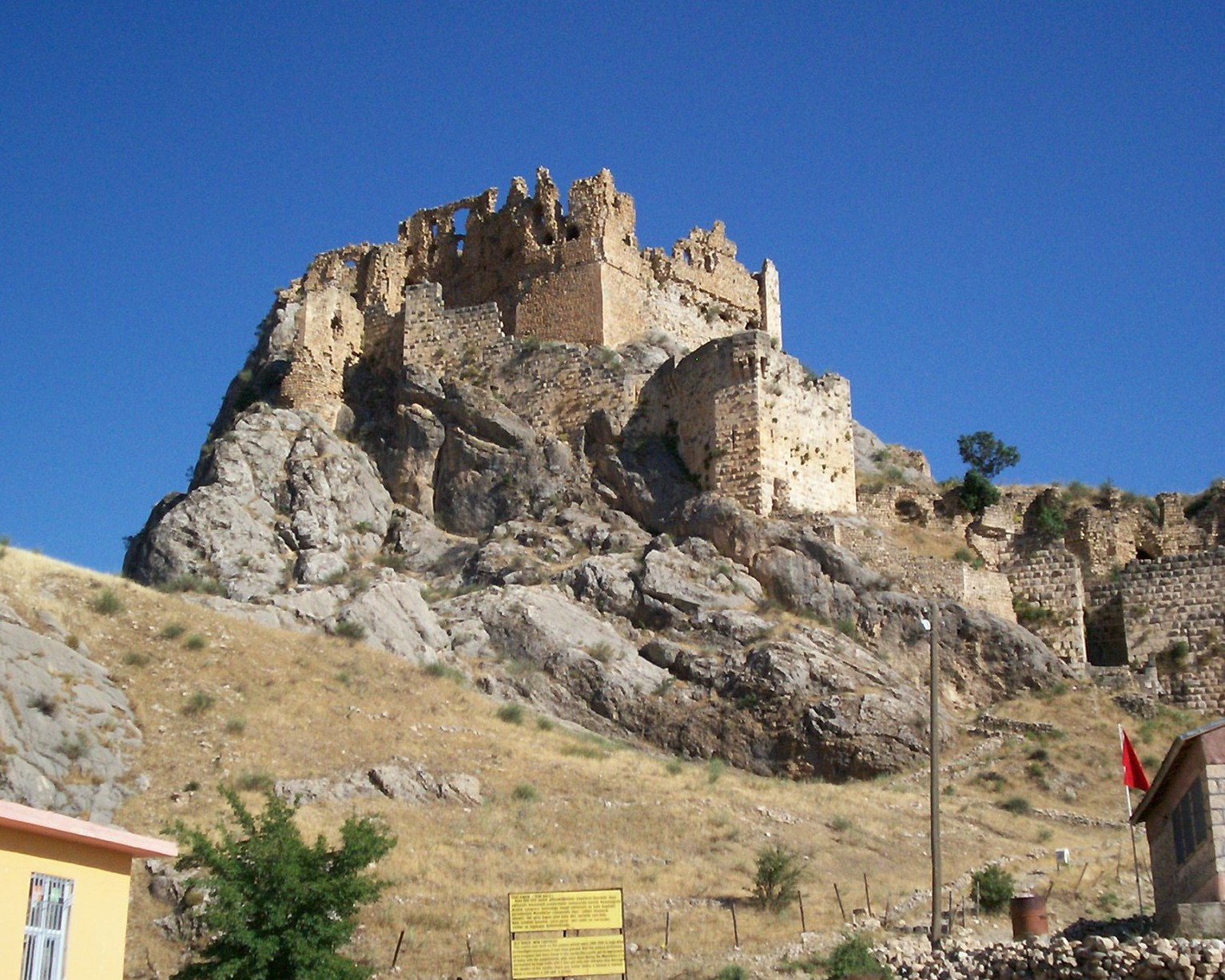
- Kâhta castle

- Location within Turkey
- Coordinates: 37°46′49″N 38°37′18″E
- Country: Turkey
- Province: Adıyaman
- District: Kâhta

Government
  - Mayor: Mehmet Can Hallaç (AKP)
- Population (2021): 86,232
- Time zone: UTC+3 (TRT)
- Postal code: 02400
- Website: www.kahta.bel.tr

Kâhta (Turkish pronunciation: [ˈcahta]; Kurdish: Kolîk, Ottoman Turkish: کولک, romanized: Kölük) is a city in Adıyaman Province of Turkey. It is the seat of Kâhta District. Its population is 86,232 (2021). The city is populated by Kurds from the Reşwan tribe.

== Neighborhoods ==
The town is divided into the neighborhoods of Atatürk, Bağlar, Bayraktar, Cami, Cumhuriyet, Çobanlı, Fatih, Fırat, Gazi, Girne, Hürriyet, Karşıyaka, Menderes, Şeyhbaba, Turanlı, Turgut Özal, Yavuz Selim and Yeni.

== Climate ==
Kâhta has a hot-summer Mediterranean climate (Köppen: Csa), with pronounced seasons. Summers are very hot and dry, and winters are cool and wet.

Climate data for Kâhta (1991–2020)
| Month | Jan | Feb | Mar | Apr | May | Jun | Jul | Aug | Sep | Oct | Nov | Dec | Year |
|---|---|---|---|---|---|---|---|---|---|---|---|---|---|
| Mean daily maximum °C (°F) | 8.4 (47.1) | 10.1 (50.2) | 15.1 (59.2) | 20.6 (69.1) | 26.9 (80.4) | 33.5 (92.3) | 38.0 (100.4) | 38.0 (100.4) | 32.9 (91.2) | 25.8 (78.4) | 16.8 (62.2) | 10.5 (50.9) | 23.1 (73.6) |
| Daily mean °C (°F) | 4.6 (40.3) | 5.8 (42.4) | 10.1 (50.2) | 15.0 (59.0) | 20.7 (69.3) | 27.1 (80.8) | 31.4 (88.5) | 31.3 (88.3) | 26.2 (79.2) | 19.8 (67.6) | 11.8 (53.2) | 6.6 (43.9) | 17.6 (63.7) |
| Mean daily minimum °C (°F) | 1.7 (35.1) | 2.3 (36.1) | 5.9 (42.6) | 9.9 (49.8) | 14.8 (58.6) | 20.8 (69.4) | 25.1 (77.2) | 24.5 (76.1) | 20.1 (68.2) | 14.9 (58.8) | 8.1 (46.6) | 3.6 (38.5) | 12.7 (54.9) |
| Average precipitation mm (inches) | 130.94 (5.16) | 99.36 (3.91) | 75.45 (2.97) | 59.96 (2.36) | 34.42 (1.36) | 8.23 (0.32) | 1.24 (0.05) | 0.71 (0.03) | 7.34 (0.29) | 48.28 (1.90) | 74.8 (2.94) | 124.78 (4.91) | 665.51 (26.20) |
| Average precipitation days (≥ 1.0 mm) | 9.2 | 9.0 | 8.0 | 6.8 | 4.7 | 1.7 | 1.1 | 1.2 | 2.5 | 4.4 | 6.2 | 9.0 | 63.8 |
| Average relative humidity (%) | 65.3 | 62.9 | 58.2 | 56.3 | 48.6 | 32.8 | 26.0 | 27.4 | 31.4 | 43.2 | 55.6 | 65.9 | 47.7 |
Source: NOAA

== Notable people ==
- Dengir Mir Mehmet Fırat (1943–2019), Kurdish politician who was one of the founders of the Justice and Development Party (AKP) in 2001
- Ahmet Aydın (*1971), Kurdish Politician
- Mehmet Yavuz (1973–2019), Kurdish politician and teacher in Turkey who led the Kurdish Islamist Free Cause Party from May 2018 until 7 October 2018
