= İshak Sağlam =

Kurdish politician

Leader of the Free Cause Party
- In office 7 October 2018 – 6 June 2021
- Preceded by: Mehmet Yavuz
- Succeeded by: Zekeriya Yapıcıoğlu

Personal details
- Born: 1966 Kozluk, Batman Province, Turkey
- Party: Free Cause Party
- Children: 7
- Education: Dicle University

İshak Sağlam (b. 1966; Kozluk) is a Kurdish politician and lawyer in Turkey who led the Kurdish Islamist Free Cause Party from October 2018 to June 2021. He subsequently became deputy chairman and head of human rights and legal affairs of the party.

== Biography ==
Born in 1966 in the town of Kozluk in Batman Province, Sağlam graduated from Dicle University in 1992 and subsequently as a lawyer. In the 2000s, he worked as a defender for members of the Movement of the Oppressed, but was also sentenced to 6 years prison for being a member of the organization.

In October 2018, he was elected leader of the Free Cause Party at the third convention of the party, winning 777 votes out of 1,165. In April 2019, Sağlam and a delegation from the Free Cause Party visited Kurdistan Region of Iraq and met with Kurdistan Democratic Party leader Masoud Barzani.
