= Opinion polling for the 2023 Turkish general election =

Opinion polls for the 2023 Turkish general election are organized by the specific office or leadership approvals.

- Opinion polling for the 2023 Turkish presidential election
- Opinion polling for the 2023 Turkish parliamentary election
- Leadership approval polling for the 2023 Turkish general election
