= Mehmet Yavuz =

Kurdish politician and teacher (1973–2019)

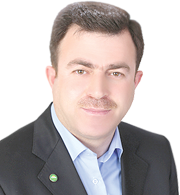

Leader of the Free Cause Party
- In office 22 May 2018 – 7 October 2018
- Preceded by: Zekeriya Yapıcıoğlu
- Succeeded by: İshak Sağlam

Personal details
- Born: 1973 Kâhta
- Died: 9 August 2019 (aged 45–46)
- Party: Free Cause Party
- Children: 4
- Education: Selçuk University

Mehmet Yavuz (1973, Kâhta – 9 August 2019), was a Kurdish politician and teacher in Turkey who led the Kurdish Islamist Free Cause Party from May 2018 until 7 October 2018.

== Biography ==
Born in 1973 in the town of Kâhta in Adıyaman Province, he graduated high school in the town before moving to Konya to study at the Selcuk University Faculty of Education. He subsequently worked as a teacher. In the 2000s, he was imprisoned for two years and later worked as a teacher in Şanlıurfa. He began his political life by writing for Doğruhaber and serving as the Deputy Chairman and Spokesperson for Hüda-Par. In 2015, he criticized President Erdoğan for stating that no Kurdish issue existed in the country. Yavuz pointed at the fact that Kurdish was classified an 'unknown language' when spoken at the Grand National Assembly, lack of mother tongue education in Kurdish and stated that the constitution was fascist. In 2018, he criticized the constitution again.

Yavuz died from kidney cancer on 9 August 2019 in Diyarbakır.

== Electoral history ==
Yavuz ran unsuccessfully as an independent in 2015 in the electoral district of Şanlıurfa and received 0.9% of the vote share.

Election	District	Votes	%	Results
General elections, 2015	Şanlıurfa	6,551	0.9%	Not elected
