= Murat Gezenler =

Turkish Salafi cleric

Murat Gezenler (born 1974) is a Turkish Salafi cleric.

== Biography ==
Gezenler was born in 1974 in Konya. He graduated from an İmam Hatip school. During his high school years, he adopted the view of Salafism. He later got a job as a Turkish-Arabic translator. He moved to Afghanistan in 2001, and was arrested in the same year for ties to Al-Qaeda, and was acquitted in 2005. Gezenler is known for his controversial views, including Anti-Turkish, Anti-Sufi, and Anti-Alevi speeches. Despite being a Turk himself, he claimed that Turks are not Muslim except for individual Salafists among them, and he also claimed that Turks voting for parties and joining the Turkish military are justified reasons to takfir them as a whole. He also criticised the usage of the term "Şehit" for dead Turkish soldiers. He moved to Syria in 2008 and was deported to Turkey where he settled in Ankara. Gezenler was a supporter of the Islamic State until 2016.

Gezenler had a dispute with many Turkish clerics, including Ahmet Mahmut Ünlü and Halil Konakçı. Gezenler had threatened Ünlü in which he claimed that "the tariqas are losing blood". Gezenler furiously hurled personal insults at Konakçı.

Gezenler delivered tents, food, and clothes to victims of the 2023 earthquakes.
