= Serkan Ramanlı =

Kurdish lawyer and politician

Serkan Ramanlı is a Turkish-Kurdish lawyer and the spokesman of the Free Cause Party from Batman. He is a member of the Grand National Assembly of Turkey for the electoral district of Batman since 2023.

== Early years and education ==
He was born in 1980 in Batman. He graduated from Van Yüzüncü Yıl University Faculty of Letters and Konya Selçuk University Faculty of Law. Ramanlı, who was registered with the Batman Bar Association, took part in the management of the bar association. He is married and has two children.

== Political career ==
Ramanlı became a member of the general administration board of the Free Cause Party and later the deputy chairman in charge of public relations and promotion. In the 2023 general elections, he was elected as a Batman deputy.

Ramanlı announced his intention to open the "Bediüzzeman Institute", an Islamic school with multiple campuses, which teaches entirely in the Kurdish language, as well as to employ Kurds as teachers, saying "within the framework of the Bediüzzaman Institute, we will bring together the leading personalities raised in Kurdish history, from our first companion Jaban al-Kurdi, to Saladin, from there to Sheikh Ubeydullah, Mahmud Barzanji, and from Sheikh Said to Mustafa Barzani, with our youth and people. We will make them know and love them. However, we will bring together the pioneers of Kurdish literature with our people. What kind of history did the Kurds come from? We want them to know what kind of civilization basin they grew up in. Unfortunately, the number of people in our society who know this today are small enough to be counted with a finger."

Ramanlı emphasised the need for dialogue and cooperation between the Free Cause Party and DEM Party. He was seen at a Batman Petrolspor match alongside the DEM Party's Batman candidate Mehdi Öztütün. Öztütün was expelled from the DEM Party after the pictures surfaced, and Ramanlı reacted by saying "I want Ms. Tülay to put an end to this. I know that DEM Party voters are also very seriously uncomfortable with this, on behalf of the people of Batman." Ramanlı also described Tuncer Bakırhan as his "family friend."

In the 2024 Turkish local elections, he ran for mayor of Batman. Also in the 2024 elections, Abdullah Zeydan of the DEM Party was elected as mayor of Van, although Turkish authorities appointed Abdulahat Arvas of the AKP as mayor instead. Ramanlı criticised Turkish authorities for the decision and claimed that Zeydan was the legitimate mayor of Van.
