= People's Alliance (Turkey) =

Turkish electoral alliance

People's Alliance Cumhur İttifakı
- Abbreviation: PEOPLE (CUMHUR)
- Leader: Recep Tayyip Erdoğan (AK Party) Devlet Bahçeli (MHP) Mustafa Destici (BBP)
- Presidential candidate: Recep Tayyip Erdoğan
- Founded: 20 February 2018
- Ideology: National conservatism Conservatism; Factions: Right-wing populism Social conservatism Neo-Ottomanism; Turkish-Islamic nationalism Turkish ultranationalism Islamokemalism; Euroscepticism
- Political position: Right-wing to far-right
- Grand National Assembly: 319 / 600
- Metropolitan municipalities: 12 / 30
- Provinces: 21 / 51
- District municipalities: 492 / 973
- Belde Municipalities: 272 / 390
- Provincial councillors: 945 / 1,251
- Municipal Assemblies: 12,992 / 20,498

The People's Alliance (Turkish: Cumhur İttifakı), abbreviated as PEOPLE (Note: In the sense of 'common folk', 'the populace'.) (Turkish: CUMHUR), is an electoral alliance in Turkey, established in February 2018 between the ruling Justice and Development Party (AK Party) and the formerly opposition Nationalist Movement Party (MHP). The alliance was formed to contest the 2018 general election, and brings together the political parties supporting the re-election of President Recep Tayyip Erdoğan. Its main rival is the Nation Alliance, which was originally created by four opposition parties in 2018 and was re-established in 2019.

== History ==
=== Background ===
After the failure of the 2013–2015 peace process with the PKK, the Justice and Development Party (AK Party) and the Nationalist Movement Party (MHP) closed ranks. With the support of MHP, President Recep Tayyip Erdoğan succeeded on passing the constitutional referendum in April 2017, which turned Turkey into a presidential system and expanded the executive power of the President of Turkey. Members of the MHP dissidents formed a new party, the moderate nationalist Good Party.

=== Formation ===
The alliance has a joint presidential candidate, incumbent President Recep Tayyip Erdoğan. Each party is expected to nominate candidates for parliament separately.

On 23 October 2018, after a series of public disagreements between the AK Party and MHP, the MHP chairman Devlet Bahçeli formally announced that his party would no longer seek to field joint mayoral candidates in the March 2019 local elections. In response, Erdoğan stressed that the two parties were fundamentally different, and must go their separate ways on issues they disagreed on.

Public disagreements focused on a general pardon for pro-MHP prisoners, as well as a court decision to annul the abolition of the Student Oath. The oath had been abolished during the Solution process by the AK Party government in an attempt to appease the PKK, who regarded its recital as racist. The court's decision to re-establish it was strongly supported by the MHP, while opposed by the AK Party. However, both parties stressed that they didn't regard this as a dissolution of the alliance in the Turkish parliament and that the suspension of the electoral alliance for the local elections was only temporary.

On March 11, 2023, HÜDA PAR leader Zekeriya Yapıcıoğlu announced that it would support the People's Alliance for the 2023 Turkish general election, also stating that it would continue its talks with the Alliance for the 2023 Turkish parliamentary election. The party will run within AKP's list. After some contradicting reports, New Welfare Party joined the People's Alliance on March 24, 2023.

== Composition ==
=== Founding members ===
Party		Photo	Leader	Position	Ideology	MPs
AK PARTİ	Justice and Development Party; Adalet ve Kalkınma Partisi		Recep Tayyip Erdoğan	Right-wing	National conservatism	273 / 600
MHP	Nationalist Movement Party; Milliyetçi Hareket Partisi		Devlet Bahçeli	Far-right	Turkish ultranationalism	47 / 600

=== Additional members ===
Party		Photo	Leader	Position	Ideology	MPs
BÜYÜK BİRLİK	Great Unity Party; Büyük Birlik Partisi		Mustafa Destici	Far-right	Turkish Islamonationalism	0 / 600

=== Former members ===
Party		Photo	Leader	Position	Ideology	MPs
YENİDEN REFAH	New Welfare Party; Yeniden Refah Partisi		Fatih Erbakan	Far-right	Islamism	4 / 600

After the formation of the alliance, there was speculation in the Turkish media, as well as among prominent analysts and politicians, that other minor parties could join it before the 24 June 2018 elections. The parties most commonly mentioned as potential future members were the Great Unity Party (BBP) and the Felicity Party (SP). While the SP ruled out joining the alliance, the BBP entered talks to join. In early May 2018, the BBP ultimately joined the alliance on the lists of the AKP, while the Felicity Party instead aligned with the opposition Nation alliance led by the Republican People's Party.

On 2023, both BBP and YRP contested on their own lists as part of the alliance.

=== Supporting parties ===
Party		Leader	Position	Ideology	MPs
HÜDA PAR	Free Cause Party; Hür Dava Partisi	Zekeriya Yapıcıoğlu	Far-right	Sunni Islamism; Kurdish Islamonationalism	4 / 600
DSP	Democratic Left Party; Demokratik Sol Parti	Önder Aksakal	Centre-left	Ecevitism; Social democracy	1 / 600
BÜYÜK TÜRKİYE	Great Turkey Party; Büyük Türkiye Partisi	Hüseyin Durmaz	Centre-right	Pan-Turkism; Kemalism	0 / 600
DYP	True Path Party; Doğru Yol Partisi	Çetin Özaçıkgöz	Centre-right	Liberal conservatism	0 / 600
YENİ DÜNYA	New World Party; Yeni Dünya Partisi	Emanullah Gündüz	Centre-right	Conservatism	0 / 600
VATAN PARTİSİ	Patriotic Party; Vatan Partisi	Doğu Perinçek	Left-wing	Kemalism; Eurasianism	0 / 600
TÜRKİYE İTTİFAKI PARTİSİ	Turkey Alliance Party; Türkiye İttifakı Partisi	Mehmet Sağlam	Centre-right	Kemalism	0 / 600
ÜLKEM	My Country Party; Ülkem Partisi	Neşet Doğan	Centre-right	Turkish nationalism	0 / 600

The Free Cause Party (HÜDA PAR) supported the Alliance in the 2018 Turkish presidential election while contesting the 2018 Turkish parliamentary election as a stand-alone party. The party announced that they will support the alliance in the 2023 Turkish presidential election. The HÜDA PAR and DSP will contest on the AKP's list, while the Great Turkey Party and True Path Party will not contest. After the first round of the 2023 presidential election, Ancestral Alliance leader Sinan Oğan supported the People's Alliance.

== Electoral history ==
=== Parliamentary elections ===
Election	Parties	Total alliance votes			Total alliance seats		Position
Election	Parties	#	%	Rank	#	±	Position
June 2018	Justice and Development Party; Nationalist Movement Party; Great Unity Party	26,904,024	53.66%	1st	344 / 600	13▼	Government
May 2023	Justice and Development Party; Nationalist Movement Party; Great Unity Party; New Welfare Party; Democratic Left Party; Free Cause Party	26,934,455	49.50%	1st	323 / 600	21▼	Government

== See also ==
- Milliyetçi Cephe (Nationalist Front)
