= 2009 Turkish local elections =

← 2004	March 29, 2009	2014 →

All 16 metropolitan and 2,903 district municipal mayors of Turkey All 3,281 provincial and 32,393 municipal councillors of Turkey
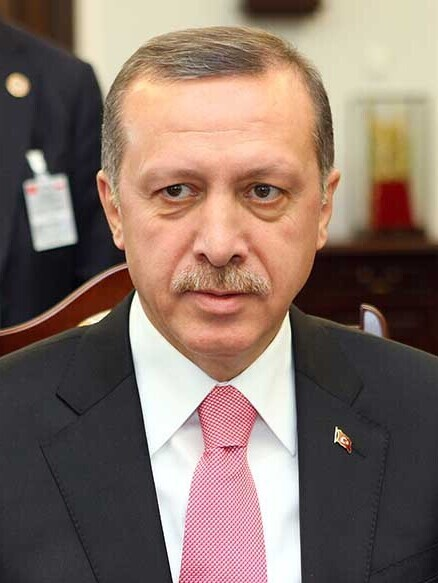

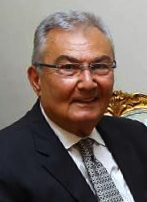

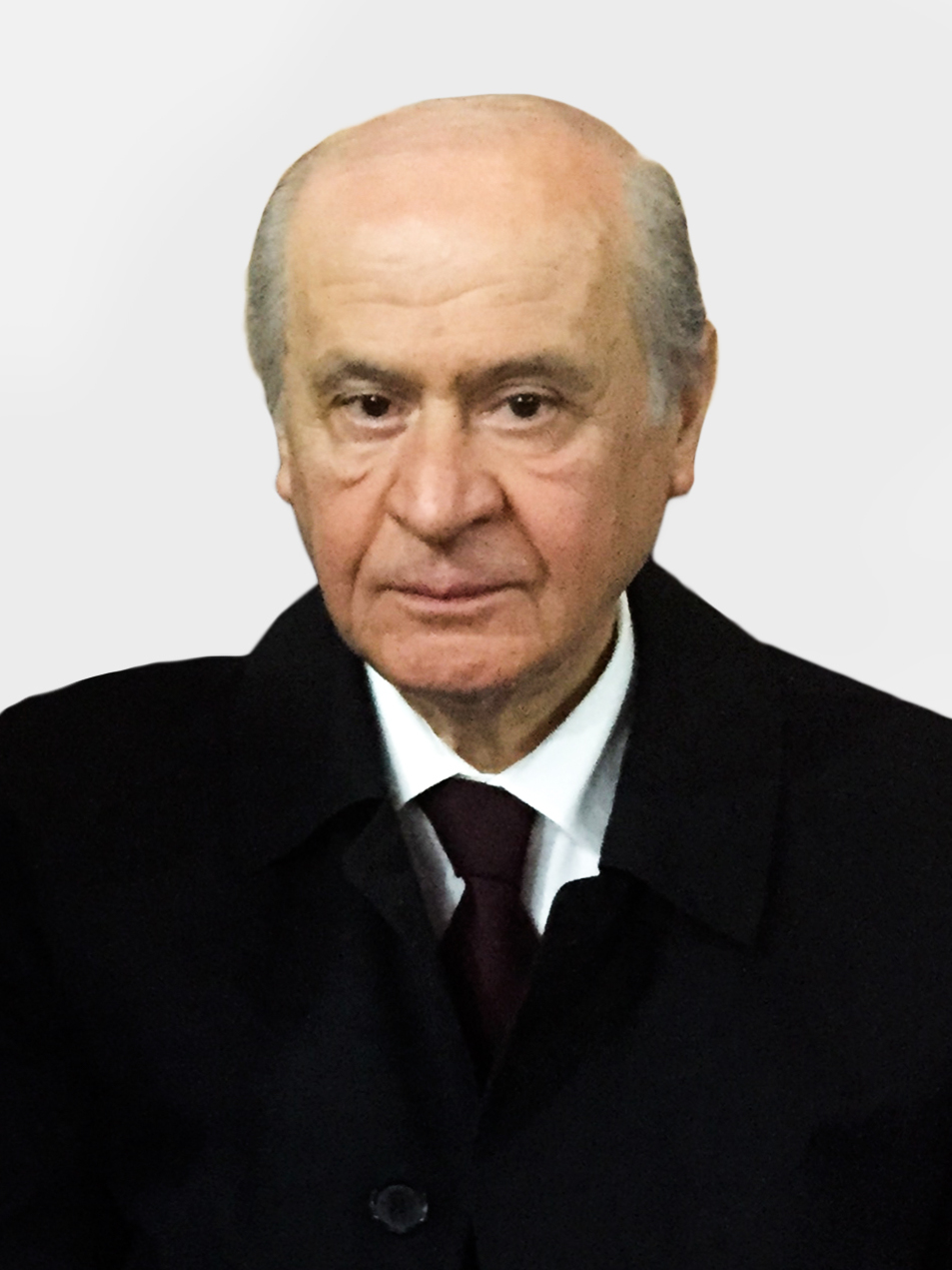
	Majority party	Minority party	Third party
Leader	Recep Tayyip Erdoğan	Deniz Baykal	Devlet Bahçeli
Party	AK Party	CHP	MHP
Leader since	14 August 2001	30 September 2000	6 July 1997
Last election	1,762 mayors 18,913 councillors	469 mayors 6,023 councillors	247 mayors 3,579 councillors
Mayors	1,452	506	484
Councillors	16,621	6,737	6,419
Popular vote^	15,353,553	9,229,936	6,386,279
Percentage	38.39%	23.08%	15.97%
Swing	▼3.28pp	▲4.85%	▲5.52pp
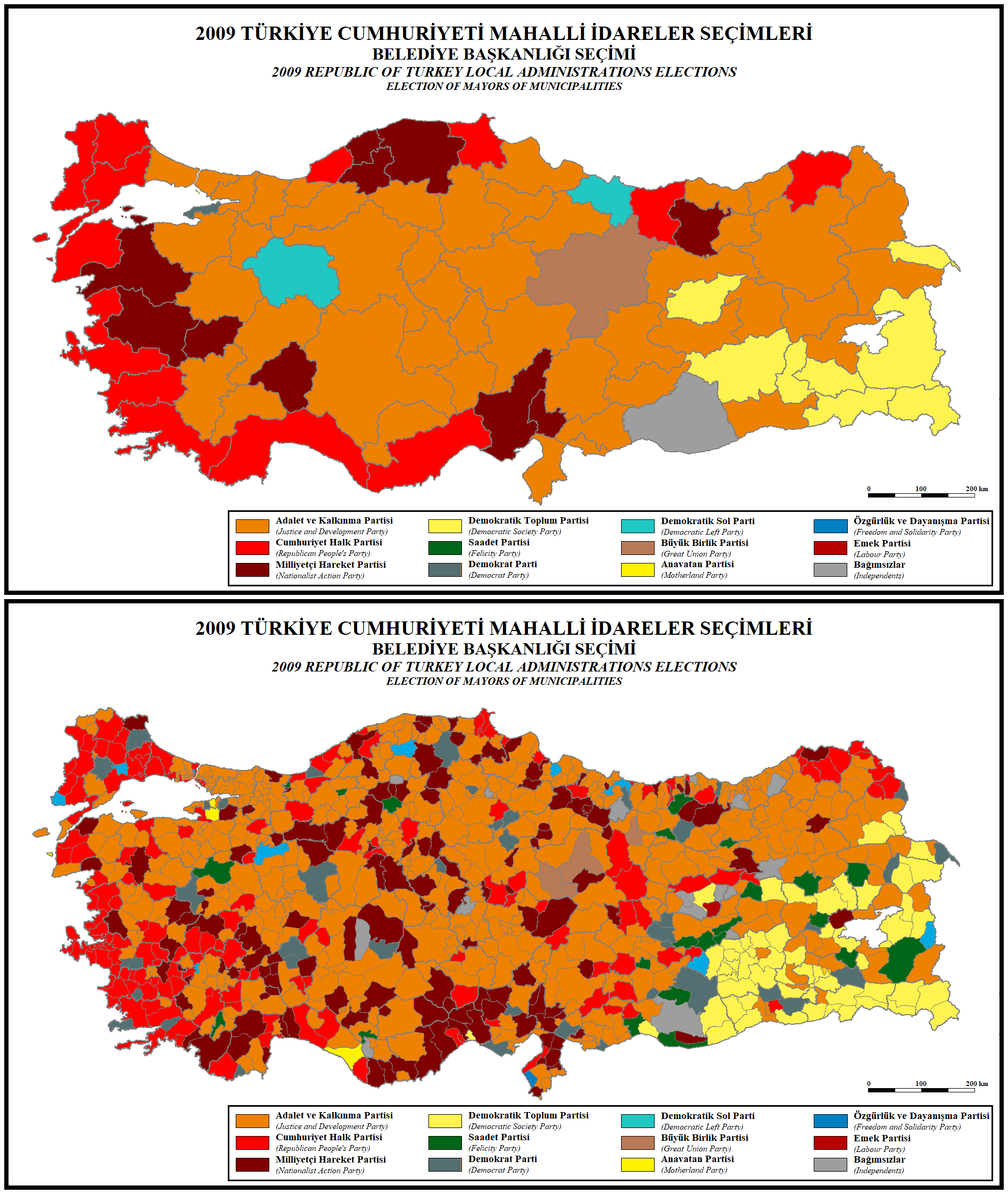
- Winners of the 81 provincial capitals by party.^ Four different elections in order to elect both types of councillor and mayor were held on the same day. The results shown here are the provincial councillor election results, which best reflect the overall voting intentions of the electorate. See the results section for the full results.

Local elections were held in Turkey on 29 March 2009. The overall winner was the ruling party Justice and Development Party, although the party saw a decline in its vote relative to the 2007 general election. The leading opposition party, the social democratic Kemalist CHP, increased its vote share, as did a number of smaller parties including the SP, DTP and BBP, whose party leader Muhsin Yazıcıoğlu had died in a helicopter crash four days before the election. The third largest party, the Turkish nationalist MHP, enjoyed a more modest vote surge. The election was not contested by Cem Uzan's GP. The AKP failed to take certain provinces it had publicly targeted, such as Diyarbakır, İzmir and Urfa, and did not achieve its goal of exceeding 47% of the overall vote. There was localized election-related fighting in southeastern Turkey, in which five people were reported to have been killed and about a hundred injured.

== Results ==
=== Provincial assemblies ===
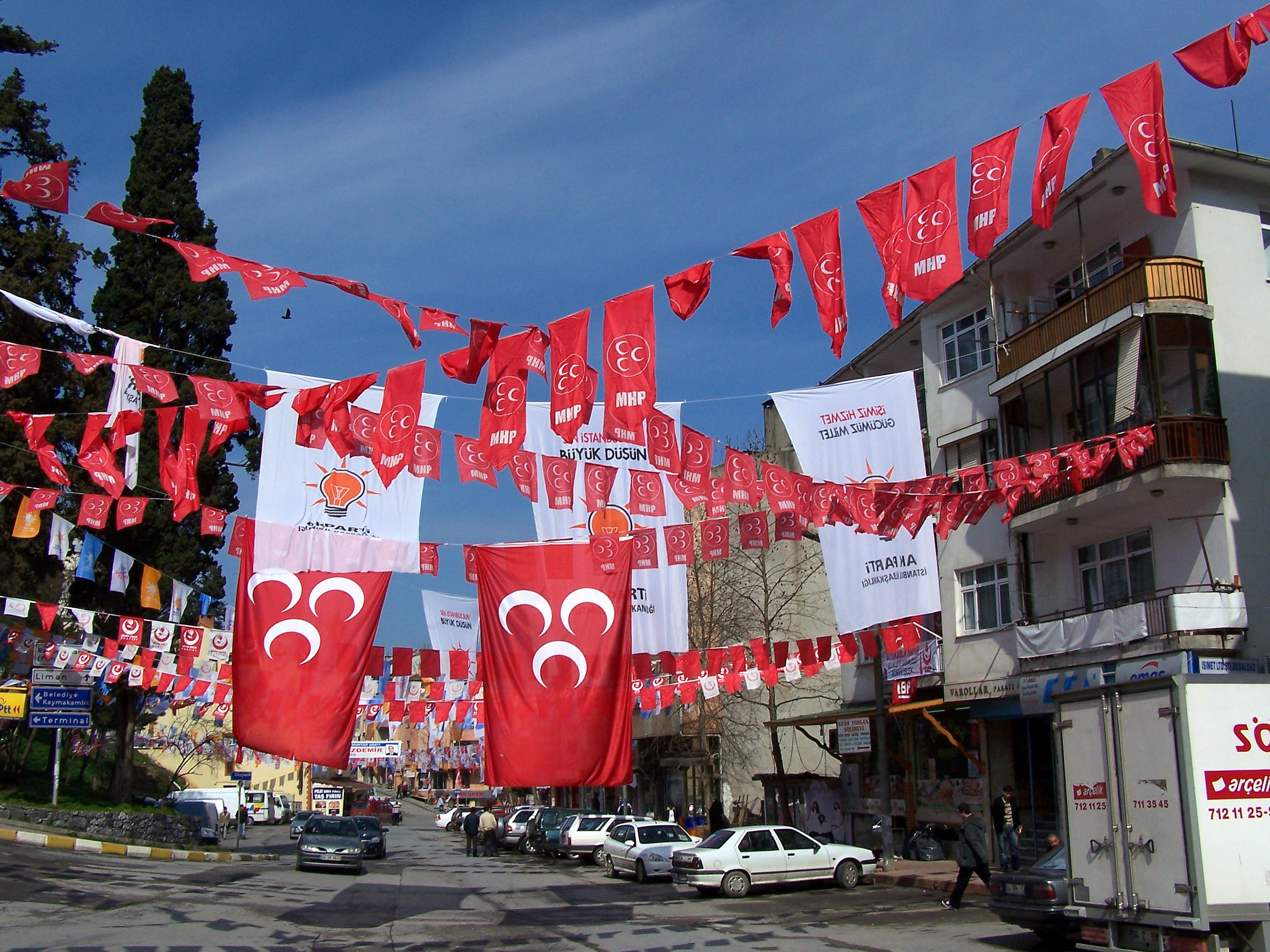
Flags of political parties before the Turkish municipal elections in Şile. The most visible ones are Nationalist Movement Party and Justice and Development Party) flags.

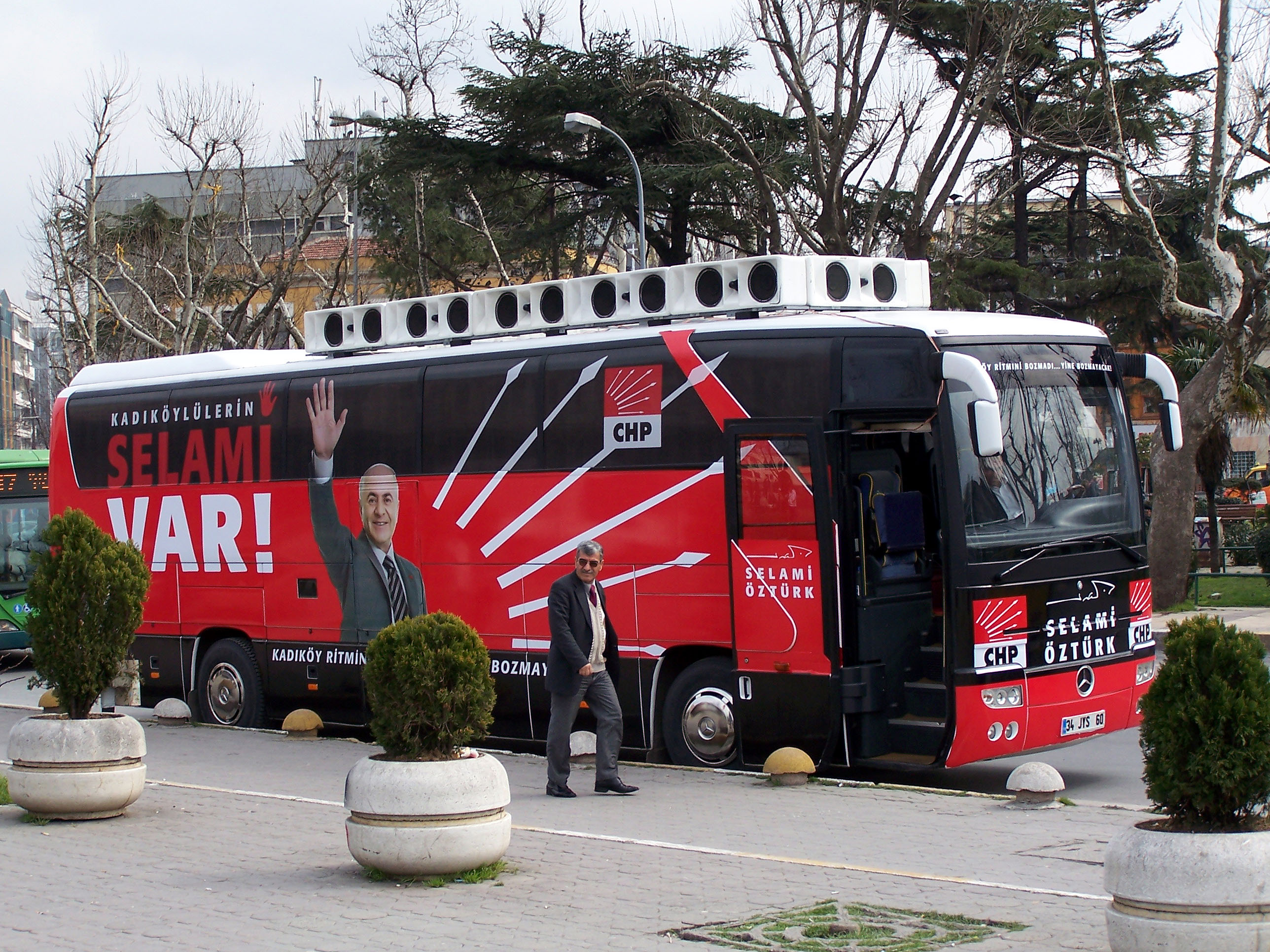
CHP (Republican People's Party) election bus before the Turkish municipal elections in Kadıköy, Istanbul

Party	Votes	%	Seats
Justice and Development Party	15,353,553	38.39	1,889
Republican People's Party	9,229,936	23.08	612
Nationalist Movement Party	6,386,279	15.97	414
Democratic Society Party	2,277,777	5.70	235
Felicity Party	2,079,701	5.20	29
Democrat Party	1,536,847	3.84	45
Democratic Left Party	1,139,878	2.85	26
Great Unity Party	943,765	2.36	18
Motherland Party	304,361	0.76	4
Independent Turkey Party	167,986	0.42	1
Workers' Party	114,243	0.29	0
Communist Party of Turkey	85,507	0.21	0
Freedom and Solidarity Party	67,984	0.17	0
Labour Party	48,939	0.12	1
Nation Party	41,818	0.10	0
Rights and Freedoms Party	29,392	0.07	0
People's Ascent Party	6,197	0.02	0
Liberal Democratic Party	2,285	0.01	0
Peace and Democracy Party	36	0.00	0
Independents	172,279	0.43	7
**Total**	**39,988,763**	**100.00**	**3,281**
Valid votes	39,988,763	97.69	
Invalid/blank votes	943,497	2.31	
Total votes	**40,932,260**	**100.00**	
Registered voters/turnout	48,049,446	85.19	

==== By province ====
Metropolitan provinces are in bold. AKP denotes provinces won by the Justice & Development Party, CHP denotes provinces won by the Republican People's Party, MHP denotes provinces won by the Nationalist Movement Party, DTP denotes provinces won by the Democratic Society Party, BBP denotes provinces won by the Great Union Party, DSP denotes provinces won by the Democratic Left Party and DP denotes provinces won by the Democrat Party.

Province	Party
**Adana**	MHP
Adıyaman	AKP
Afyonkarahisar	AKP
Ağrı	AKP
Amasya	AKP
**Ankara**	AKP
**Antalya**	CHP
Artvin	CHP
Aydın	CHP
Balıkesir	MHP
Bilecik	AKP
Bingöl	AKP
Bitlis	AKP
Bolu	AKP
Burdur	AKP
**Bursa**	AKP
Çanakkale	CHP

Province	Party
Çankırı	AKP
Çorum	AKP
Denizli	AKP
**Diyarbakır**	DTP
Edirne	CHP
Elazığ	AKP
Erzincan	AKP
**Erzurum**	AKP
**Eskişehir**	DSP
**Gaziantep**	AKP
Giresun	CHP
Gümüşhane	MHP
Hakkâri	DTP
Hatay	AKP
Isparta	MHP
**Mersin**	CHP
**Istanbul**	AKP

Province	Party
**İzmir**	CHP
Kars	AKP
Kastamonu	MHP
**Kayseri**	AKP
Kırklareli	CHP
Kırşehir	AKP
**Kocaeli**	AKP
**Konya**	AKP
Kütahya	AKP
Malatya	AKP
Manisa	MHP
Kahramanmaraş	AKP
Mardin	AKP
Muğla	CHP
Muş	AKP
Nevşehir	AKP
Niğde	AKP

Province	Party
Ordu	DSP
Rize	AKP
**Sakarya**	AKP
**Samsun**	AKP
Siirt	DTP
Sinop	CHP
Sivas	BBP
Tekirdağ	CHP
Tokat	AKP
Trabzon	AKP
Tunceli	DTP
Şanlıurfa	IND.
Uşak	MHP
Van	DTP
Yozgat	AKP
Zonguldak	CHP
Aksaray	AKP

Province	Party
Bayburt	AKP
Karaman	AKP
Kırıkkale	AKP
Batman	DTP
Şırnak	DTP
Bartın	MHP
Ardahan	AKP
Iğdır	DTP
Yalova	DP
Karabük	MHP
Kilis	AKP
Osmaniye	MHP
Düzce	AKP

=== District elections ===
Elections were also held for district mayors (ilçe başkanı) as well as neighbourhood presidents (muhtar).
