= Yalçın Topçu =

Turkish politician

Minister of Culture and Tourism
- In office 28 August 2015 – 17 November 2015
- Prime Minister: Ahmet Davutoğlu
- Preceded by: Ömer Çelik
- Succeeded by: Mahir Ünal

Chairman of the Great Union Party
- In office 24 May 2009 – 12 June 2011
- Preceded by: Muhsin Yazıcıoğlu
- Succeeded by: Hakkı Öznur

Personal details
- Born: Yalçın Topçu; 1957 (age 68–69) Ardahan, Turkey
- Party: Independent (2014-present); Great Union Party (BBP) (1993-1996, 2007-2014); Nationalist Labour Party (MÇP) (before 1992)
- Occupation: Civil servant, politician
- Cabinet: 63rd

Yalçın Topçu (born 1957) is a Turkish politician and former bureaucrat who served as the Minister of Culture and Tourism in the interim election government formed by Prime Minister Ahmet Davutoğlu from 28 August to 17 November 2015. He was formerly the leader of the Great Union Party between 2009 and 2011, resigning after being defeated in the 2011 general election.

== Life and early career ==
Yalçın Topçu was born in 1957 in Ardahan in eastern Turkey. His family is of Turkish Meskhetian origin.

=== Bureaucratic career ===
Topçu was a public sector worker before becoming a founding member of the Great Union Party in 1993. In 1996, he returned to his position in the civil service and worked in the Press and Public Relations Undersecretariat to the Prime Ministry of Turkey for 11 years. In 2007, he retired from the civil service while serving as an assistant manager for business.

=== Political career ===
While serving as the district President of the Nationalist Labour Party (MÇP) branch in Mamak, Ankara, Topçu joined 6 MÇP Members of Parliament and resigned from the party on 7 July 2007. He subsequently became a founding member of the Great Union Party (BBP). He later returned to his career in the civil service in 1996. In 2007, he was invited by BBP leader Muhsin Yazıcıoğlu to become the General Secretary of the party, a position to which he was elected in the BBP's 3rd congress in 2007.

After the death of Muhsin Yazıcıoğlu in 2009, Topçu was elected leader of the BBP in the party's 4th congress. He resigned after a defeat in the 2011 general election. In a statement he released on his party's website, Topçu stated that he bore the blame for the party's failure and that there is no word to be said after the people of a democracy had spoken. On 3 February 2014, he resigned from the BBP altogether.

== Minister of Culture and Tourism ==
After the June 2015 general election resulted in a hung parliament, unsuccessful coalition negotiations raised speculation over whether President Recep Tayyip Erdoğan would call an early election in the event that AKP leader Ahmet Davutoğlu was unable to form a government within the given constitutional time of 45 days. As required by the 114th article of the Constitution of Turkey, the calling of a snap general election by the President necessitates the forming of an interim election government, in which all parties represented in Parliament are given a certain number of ministers according to how many MPs they have. If a party refused to send ministers to the interim cabinet, then independents must take their place. As an independent politician, Topçu was appointed as the Minister of Culture and Tourism by Davutoğlu on 28 August 2015, a move which came as a general surprise to many political observers and commentators.

== See also ==
- Felicity Party
- Turkish nationalism

Party political offices
Preceded by Muhsin Yazıcıoğlu	Leader of the Great Union Party; 24 May 2009 – 12 June 2011	Succeeded by Hakkı Öznur
