= Remzi Çayır =

Turkish far-right politician

Remzi Çayır is a Turkish far-right politician and the founder and leader of the National Path Party.

== Personal life ==
He was born on 1 January 1959, in the Abbaslar village of Kahramanmaraş Province. Before the 1980 Turkish coup d'état, he was arrested in 1979 and imprisoned for his Idealist activities while he was a student at Ankara University Faculty of Science. He received a degree in economics while in prison. He was released from prison in 1991.

He was a friend of Muhsin Yazıcıoğlu and took part in assisting Yazıcıoğlu in the establishment process of the Great Unity Party. He participated in the court case of the murder of Yazıcıoğlu. During the assassination of Sinan Ateş, he said that the killers of Ateş were the same ones who killed Yazıcıoğlu.

He became a candidate for the mayor of Ankara as a member of the BBP in the 2014 local elections. He left the BBP in 2018 after serving in the party's leadership for 25 years. Shortly after leaving the BBP, he survived an assassination attempt. He founded the National Path Party in 2021. He is a critic of Recep Tayyip Erdoğan.
