= Alparslan Kuytul =

Kurdish cleric (born 1965)

- Born: 1965 (age 60–61); Karataş, Adana Province, Turkey
- Education: Çukurova University, Al-Azhar University
- Occupation: Cleric
- Known for: Islamism
- Movement: Hanafi

Alparslan Kuytul is a Turkish Islamist cleric who leads the Furkan Education and Service Foundation. Kuytul, an advocate of pan-Islamism, is known as a fierce opponent of the Turkish government, and has been detained by Turkish authorities for alleged criminal activity on several occasions.

== Biography ==
Alparslan Kuytul was born in 1965 in Karataş, Adana. He graduated from Çukurova University, Faculty of Architecture-Engineering, Department of Civil engineering in 1991. Between 1993 and 1997, he studied in the Islamic Law of the Faculty of Sharia at Al-Azhar University. During his years at Al-Azhar University, he founded the Furkan Education and Service Foundation. Kuytul has a channel called Furkan TV. He has also been the editor-in-chief of Furkan Nesli magazine since 2011. Alparslan Kuytul said in a program that he was not a Salafi and belonged to the Hanafi school. He is married to Semra Kuytul and has 5 children.

=== Legal issues ===
Kuytul was detained on 30 January 2018 and arrested on 8 February 2018. He was charged with establishing a criminal organization, aggravated fraud, and supporting a terrorist organization. He was released on 5 December 2019, and acquitted of all charges on 3 November 2020.

Kuytul was arrested again by the Adana High Criminal Court on 9 May 2022 and imprisoned in Ağrı Prison. He was charged with establishing a criminal organization, being a member of a criminal organization, "aggravated looting", false imprisonment, and manslaughter. He was released from prison on 16 June 2023.

Kuytul and his wife were again arrested on 19 August 2026 by police in Adana after Kuytul criticized arrest of Alihan Kuris, the leader of Süleymancılar --an Islamic movement who focuses on Quran education globally. He was charged with leading a criminal organization, money laundering, forgery, and tax fraud.

== Views ==
Kuytul advocates for Sharia law in Turkey, and is also a critic of Recep Tayyip Erdoğan. He became even more critical of Erdoğan following his handling of the 2016 coup attempt and the state of emergency. Kuytul was baselessly accused by Erdoğanists of supporting the Islamic State, PKK, and "FETÖ" — a term coined by the Turkish government for the Gülen movement that is not recognized internationally. He denied these claims, saying "is there such person in the world? FETÖ, PKK, ISIS, and Al-Qaeda all at once, is there such person in the world?" Kuytul was described as being the fiercest critic of Erdoğan among Islamists in Turkey. Kuytul once stated that if the AKP ever "declares war", him and his supporters would not back away. He refers to the AKP as ZKP (Zülüm Kalkınma Partisi) meaning "Oppressive Development Party".

He is a Pan-Islamist and stated that "the infidel has already divided us into 50–60 pieces. We shouldn't want to be divided again. If the Turks want a Turkish state, the Kurds will want a Kurdish state as a result. Arabs will also want an Arab state. But if they all want the Islamic state, then they can unite. Every race must abandon the understanding of the nation-state. We are already very divided, will we be divided again? Therefore, everyone should understand the Quran in order not to be divided again. We must return to Islamic civilization. Whatever rights the Quran gives to every race, everyone will consent to those rights, with its Turks, Kurds, Arabs. We will all lose when we are divided. Turks, Kurds, and Arabs. Muslims should not be supporters of a nation-state, they should not be supporters of a racial state. All of them should have an understanding of a religion-state. We cannot change our race, but we are all Muslims. We unite on this. We can live in brotherhood in an Islamic civilization, as we did in the past."

Kuytul was involved in a feud with Devlet Bahçeli and Süleyman Soylu. In April 2022, following a raid on Kuytul's Furkan Foundation in Adana, Kuytul claimed that "the MHP completely claimed responsibility for the incident. There is no one who does not know that the police are already completely under the control of the MHP, it was obvious from the mustache of all the policemen who attacked us. They set up a special team, they all agreed and filled the young riot police. They brought those young policemen there and attacked us and abused our rights."

Kuytul is a long-time critic of the Turkish government's policies towards Kurds, and views the oppressive policies towards Kurds as un-Islamic. He supports the recognition of the Kurdish language in Turkey, as well as Kurdish education in schools. He claimed that Kurdish nationalism is reactionary and the only way it would disappear is if Turkish nationalism also disappears and both groups agree on Islam.

He criticised the Republic of Turkey and claimed that it is against Islam due to it being a nation state based on Turks. He also stated that Turkish soldiers who died for the sake of nationalism, racism, or opportunism, do not deserve to be called "şehit". He criticised the Victory Party and accused it of being "the most racist party".

Kuytul was involved in a feud with Cübbeli Ahmet as well. Ahmet, known for his nationalist sentiments and support for Erdoğan, accused Kuytul and the Furkan Foundation of being allied with the PKK and CHP to divide Turkey.

He claimed that any Muslim who works with the United States or Russia will only receive betrayal in the end.

Kuytul criticised the Turkish involvement in the Syrian civil war, and was arrested in February 2018 for criticising the Afrin offensive. He claimed that Turkey's operation in Afrin was motivated only by Anti-Kurdism, and stated "why does Turkey agree with the Arab state in Iraq and Syria at its borders, but does not consent to a Kurdish state? As a Muslim, I am not satisfied with a Kurdish, Turkish or Arab state. I am satisfied with the Islamic state and its civilization. I'm not saying that Turkey should be satisfied with the Kurdish state. I say they are all wrong. If we are Muslims, we will have the understanding of the ummah, not the understanding of race."
