= Leadership approval polling for the 2023 Turkish general election =

In the run up to the 2023 Turkish presidential and parliamentary elections, held on 14 May 2023, various organizations carry out opinion polling to gauge voting intention in Turkey. Results of such polls are displayed in this article. These polls only include Turkish voters nationwide and do not take into account Turkish expatriates voting abroad. The date range for these opinion polls are from the previous general election, held on 24 June 2018, to the present day.

== Recep Tayyip Erdoğan ==
Recep Tayyip Erdoğan is the current president of Turkey and the leader of Justice and Development Party (AKP).

=== 2022 ===
Fieldwork date	Polling firm				Net
Fieldwork date	Polling firm	Approve	Disapprove	No opinion	Net
Jul	Bupar	29.4	60.2	10.4	−30.8
Mar	MetroPOLL	43.3	50.3	6.5	−7.0
Feb	MetroPOLL	41.1	54.2	4.7	−13.1
Feb	Yöneylem	32.2	55.6	9.8	−23.4
Jan	MetroPOLL	40.7	54.4	4.9	−13.7

=== 2021 ===
Fieldwork date	Polling firm				Net
Fieldwork date	Polling firm	Approve	Disapprove	No opinion	Net
Dec	Metropoll	38.6	57.2	4.3	-18.6
Dec	Yöneylem	31	59.6	9.4	-28.6
Nov	Metropoll	39.3	54.5	6.2	-15.2
Oct	Metropoll	38.9	56.2	4.9	-17.3
Sep	AREA	46	47	7	-1
Aug	Metropoll	38.1	51.5	10.5	−13.5
Jul	Metropoll	48.1	47.0	4.9	1.1
Jul	Optimar	45.8	42.5	11.7	3.3
Jun	Metropoll	47.1	48.6	4.3	−1.5
Jun	Aksoy	32.8	50.5	16.7	−17.7
May	AREA	46.8	46.1	7.1	0.7
May	MetroPOLL	45.2	49.0	5.9	−3.8
May	Aksoy	32.0	48.4	19.7	−16.4
Apr	AREA	42.5	46.3	11.2	−3.8
Apr	MetroPOLL	44.5	51.6	3.8	−7.1
Mar	MetroPOLL	49.0	46.7	4.3	2.3
Feb	MetroPOLL	46.0	47.8	6.2	−1.8
Feb	Aksoy	34.4	45.1	20.5	−10.7
Jan	MetroPOLL	46.1	47.4	6.5	−1.3

=== 2020 ===
Fieldwork date	Polling firm				Net
Fieldwork date	Polling firm	Approve	Disapprove	No opinion	Net
Dec	MetroPOLL	45.6	48.1	6.3	−2.5
Dec	Konsensus	49.6	38.1	12.3	11.5
Nov	MetroPOLL	46.2	46.6	7.2	-0.4
Nov	AREA	47.5	42.9	9.6	4.6
Oct	MetroPOLL	50.9	44.7	4.4	6.2
Oct	AREA	52.5	41.6	5.9	10.9
Sep	MetroPOLL	52.3	43.0	4.7	9.3
Aug	MetroPOLL	47.9	46.2	5.9	1.7
Aug	AREA	52.7	38.6	8.7	14.1
Jul	Aksoy	36.8	45.9	17.3	−9.1
Jul	MetroPOLL	52.0	40.9	7.2	11.1
Jul	AKAM	37.8	42.1	20.1	−4.3
Jun	AREA	51.9	40.7	7.4	11.2
Jun	MetroPOLL	52.0	40.9	7.2	11.1
May	AREA	51.6	39.9	8.5	11.7
May	MetroPOLL	50.8	39.8	9.4	11.0
Apr	AREA	44.3	51.6	4.1	−7.3
Apr	MetroPOLL	52.0	36.6	11.4	15.4
Mar	KONDA	40.0	36.0	24.0	4.0
Mar	MetroPOLL	57.2	35.5	7.3	21.7
Mar	MetroPOLL	55.8	39.9	4.3	15.9
Feb	KONDA	38.0	39.0	23.0	−1.0
Feb	AREA	43.1	50.1	6.8	−7.0
Feb	MetroPOLL	41.1	51.7	7.2	−10.6
Jan	KONDA	37.0	36.0	27.0	1.0
Jan	AREA	40.0	53.5	6.5	−13.5
Jan	MetroPOLL	41.9	46.0	12.1	−4.1

=== 2019 ===
Fieldwork date	Polling firm				Net
Fieldwork date	Polling firm	Approve	Disapprove	No opinion	Net
Dec	KONDA	38.0	38.0	24.0	0.0
Dec	MetroPOLL	50.2	44.4	5.5	5.8
Dec	AREA	44.1	51.3	4.6	−7.2
Dec	MetroPOLL	43.7	42.2	14.0	1.5
Nov	KONDA	42.0	33.0	25.0	9.0
Oct	KONDA	36.0	40.0	24.0	−4.0
Oct	MetroPOLL	48.0	33.7	18.2	14.3
Sep	KONDA	37.0	40.0	23.0	−3.0
Aug	MetroPOLL	44.0	48.5	7.5	−4.5
Jul	MetroPOLL	42.3	47.5	10.2	−5.2
May	KONDA	38.0	39.0	23.0	−1.0
Apr	KONDA	45.0	36.0	19.0	9.0
Apr	MetroPOLL	41.7	48.3	10.0	−6.6
Mar	KONDA	38.0	39.0	23.0	−1.0
Mar	MetroPOLL	43.7	45.9	10.4	−2.2
Feb	KONDA	37.0	38.0	25.0	−1.0
Feb	MetroPOLL	44.6	43.2	12.2	1.4
Jan	KONDA	38.0	37.0	25.0	1.0
Jan	MetroPOLL	43.1	43.5	13.4	-0.4

=== 2018 ===
Fieldwork date	Polling firm				Net
Fieldwork date	Polling firm	Approve	Disapprove	No opinion	Net
Dec	MetroPOLL	45.0	44.3	10.7	0.7
Nov	KONDA	42.0	38.0	20.0	4.0
Oct	KONDA	42.0	37.0	21.0	5.0
Oct	MetroPOLL	39.8	46.2	14.0	−6.4
Sep	KONDA	47.0	32.0	21.0	15.0
Sep	MetroPOLL	41.8	47.9	10.3	−6.1
Aug	MetroPOLL	44.5	46.7	8.8	−2.2
Jul	MetroPOLL	53.1	38.2	8.7	14.9

== Ekrem İmamoğlu ==
Ekrem İmamoğlu is the current mayor of Istanbul and a potential presidential candidate of Republican People's Party (CHP).

=== Graphical summary ===
Fieldwork date	Polling firm				Net
Fieldwork date	Polling firm	Approve	Disapprove	No opinion	Net
Sep	AREA	48	47	5	1
Jun	AREA	50.2	35.8	14.0	14.4
May	AREA	47.5	43.6	8.9	3.9
Apr	AREA	41.5	44.8	13.7	−3.3
2021
Nov	AREA	49.4	40.7	9.9	8.7
Aug	AREA	39.7	47.1	13.2	−7.4
Mar	MetroPOLL	53.0	36.3	10.8	16.7
2020
Dec	AREA	41.1	52.4	6.5	−11.3
Dec	MetroPOLL	48.6	44.7	6.7	3.9
2019

== Mansur Yavaş ==
Mansur Yavaş is the current mayor of Ankara and a potential presidential candidate of Republican People's Party (CHP).

=== Graphical summary ===
Fieldwork date	Polling firm				Net
Fieldwork date	Polling firm	Approve	Disapprove	No opinion	Net
Sep	AREA	54	40	6	14
Jun	AREA	61.5	22.6	15.9	38.9
May	AREA	52.5	35.8	11.7	16.7
Apr	AREA	50.3	36.2	13.5	14.1
2021
Nov	AREA	61.0	28.3	10.7	32.7
Aug	AREA	50.8	37.8	11.9	13.0
Mar	MetroPOLL	44.0	38.2	17.8	5.8
2020
Dec	AREA	36.6	55.7	7.7	−19.1
Dec	MetroPOLL	38.8	48.7	12.5	−9.9
2019

== Kemal Kılıçdaroğlu ==
Kemal Kılıçdaroğlu is the president of, and a potential presidential candidate of Republican People's Party (CHP).

Fieldwork date	Polling firm				Net
Fieldwork date	Polling firm	Approve	Disapprove	No opinion	Net
Sep	AREA	35	59	6	-24
May	AREA	26.0	64.2	9.8	−38.2
Apr	AREA	25.6	60.4	14.0	−34.8
2021
Dec	Konsensus	26.4	59.4	14.2	−33.0
Nov	AREA	25.2	62.4	12.4	−37.2
Oct	AREA	21.7	69.8	8.5	−48.1
Aug	AREA	27.8	60.8	11.4	−33.0
Jul	AKAM	32.4	46.3	21.3	−13.9
Jun	AREA	25.9	63.9	10.2	−38.0
May	AREA	26.9	61.8	11.3	−34.9
Apr	AREA	28.6	59.3	12.1	−30.7
Mar	MetroPOLL	25.2	66.1	8.7	−40.9
2020
Dec	AREA	27.8	67.9	4.3	−40.1
Dec	MetroPOLL	33.7	60.4	5.8	−26.7
2019

== Meral Akşener ==
Meral Akşener is the president of, and a presidential candidate of Good Party (İYİ). She was previously member of MHP, and a former Minister of the Interior.

Fieldwork date	Polling firm				Net
Fieldwork date	Polling firm	Approve	Disapprove	No opinion	Net
Sep	AREA	44	50	6	-6
May	AREA	40.9	48.8	10.3	−7.9
Apr	AREA	37.6	49.6	12.8	−12.0
2021
Dec	Konsensus	28.6	54.1	17.3	−25.5
Nov	AREA	41.1	47.1	11.8	−6.0
Oct	AREA	38.5	54.0	7.5	−15.5
Aug	AREA	40.7	48.0	11.3	−7.3
Jul	AKAM	21.9	54.7	23.4	−32.8
Jun	AREA	35.7	54.3	10.0	−18.6
May	AREA	38.3	50.3	11.4	−12.0
Apr	AREA	31.2	49.3	19.5	−18.1
Mar	MetroPOLL	37.3	53.6	9.1	−16.3
2020
Dec	AREA	28.1	67.8	4.1	−39.7
Dec	MetroPOLL	27.8	64.7	7.4	−36.9
2019

== Devlet Bahçeli ==
Devlet Bahçeli is the president of Nationalist Movement Party (MHP).

Fieldwork date	Polling firm				Net
Fieldwork date	Polling firm	Approve	Disapprove	No opinion	Net
Sep	AREA	41	54	5	-13
May	AREA	32.8	58.3	8.9	−25.5
Apr	AREA	28.2	61.1	10.7	−32.9
2021
Dec	Konsensus	31.7	52.9	15.4	−21.2
Nov	AREA	34.8	55.3	9.9	−20.5
Oct	AREA	36.9	57.5	5.6	−20.6
Aug	AREA	33.5	55.2	11.3	−21.7
Jul	AKAM	15.0	56.7	28.3	−41.7
Jun	AREA	32.4	59.1	8.5	−26.7
May	AREA	32.3	58.4	9.3	−26.1
Apr	AREA	32.8	51.8	15.4	−19.0
Mar	MetroPOLL	35.2	57.1	7.6	−21.9
2020
Dec	AREA	33.9	62.9	3.2	−29.0
Dec	MetroPOLL	34.3	59.6	6.2	−25.3
2019

== Selahattin Demirtaş ==
Selahattin Demirtaş is the former co-chairperson and presidential candidate of Peoples' Democratic Party (HDP). He is currently incarcerated.

Fieldwork date	Polling firm				Net
Fieldwork date	Polling firm	Approve	Disapprove	No opinion	Net
Sep	AREA	26	68	6	-42
May	AREA	15.5	76.1	8.4	−60.6
Apr	AREA	13.2	72.8	14.0	−59.6
2021
Nov	AREA	17.7	70.7	11.6	−53.0
Oct	AREA	16.6	75.1	8.3	−58.5
Aug	AREA	16.4	71.3	12.2	−54.9
Jul	AKAM	15.3	67.8	16.9	−52.5
Jun	AREA	16.2	72.3	11.5	−56.1
May	AREA	14.9	73.3	11.8	−58.4
Apr	AREA	16.5	67.3	16.2	−50.8
Mar	MetroPOLL	15.6	73.4	11.0	−57.8
2020
Dec	AREA	15.0	80.5	4.5	−65.5
Dec	MetroPOLL	19.3	73.0	7.8	−53.7
2019

== Ali Babacan ==
Ali Babacan is the leader of Democracy and Progress Party (DEVA). He was previously a member of AKP. He was a former Minister of Foreign Affairs, and of Customs and Trade.

Fieldwork date	Polling firm				Net
Fieldwork date	Polling firm	Approve	Disapprove	No opinion	Net
Sep	AREA	33	57	10	-24
May	AREA	24.0	60.0	16.0	−36.0
Apr	AREA	21.0	57.4	21.6	−36.4
2021
Nov	AREA	27.3	56.7	16.0	−29.6
Oct	AREA	20.2	68.0	11.8	−47.8
Aug	AREA	19.4	61.1	19.5	−41.7
Jul	AKAM	4.1	52.3	43.6	−48.2
Jun	AREA	27.4	52.7	19.9	−25.3
May	AREA	20.1	60.8	19.1	−40.7
Mar	MetroPOLL	18.2	57.2	24.6	−39.0
2020
Dec	AREA	8.9	84.2	6.8	−74.3
Dec	MetroPOLL	19.1	69.7	11.3	−50.6
2019

== Ahmet Davutoğlu ==
Ahmet Davutoğlu is the leader of Future Party (GP). He was previously a member of AKP. He was formerly the Prime Minister of Turkey.

Fieldwork date	Polling firm				Net
Fieldwork date	Polling firm	Approve	Disapprove	No opinion	Net
Sep	AREA	24	68	8	-44
May	AREA	17.8	70.4	11.8	−52.6
Apr	AREA	14.5	67.8	17.7	−53.3
2021
Nov	AREA	16.4	68.4	15.2	−52.0
Oct	AREA	16.0	73.3	10.7	−57.3
Aug	AREA	16.5	66.9	16.6	−50.4
Jul	AKAM	9.9	72.1	18.0	−62.2
Jun	AREA	21.0	62.1	16.9	−41.1
May	AREA	14.9	67.6	17.5	−52.7
Mar	MetroPOLL	21.9	58.7	19.4	−36.8
2020
Dec	AREA	8.8	84.8	6.4	−76.0
Dec	MetroPOLL	21.0	66.8	12.3	−45.8
2019

== Muharrem İnce ==
Muharrem İnce is the chairperson of Homeland Party. He was a member of Republican People's Party (CHP), and he was CHP's previous presidential candidate.

Fieldwork date	Polling firm				Net
Fieldwork date	Polling firm	Approve	Disapprove	No opinion	Net
Sep	AREA	32	61	7	-29
May	AREA	25.8	61.7	12.5	−35.9
Apr	AREA	19.1	64.7	16.2	−45.6
2021
Dec	Konsensus	27.3	57.5	15.2	−30.2
Oct	AREA	24.9	65.4	9.7	−40.5
Aug	AREA	25.3	58.3	16.4	−33.0
2020

== Temel Karamollaoğlu ==
Temel Karamollaoğlu is the leader and presidential candidate of Felicity Party.

Fieldwork date	Polling firm				Net
Fieldwork date	Polling firm	Approve	Disapprove	No opinion	Net
Sep	AREA	26	64	10	-38
May	AREA	14.5	70.7	14.8	−56.2
2021
Oct	AREA	15.3	68.6	16.1	−53.3
Jul	AKAM	11.2	63.2	25.6	−52.0
Mar	MetroPOLL	14.9	61.8	23.3	−46.9
2020
Dec	AREA	7.7	46.0	46.3	−38.3
Dec	MetroPOLL	15.3	72.9	11.8	−57.6
2019

== Others ==
Fieldwork date	Polling firm	Politician	Party				Net	Notes
Fieldwork date	Polling firm	Politician	Party	Approve	Disapprove	No Opinion	Net	Notes
Sep	AREA	Mustafa Sarıgül	TDP	23	66	11	-43	Leader of Party of Change in Turkey (TDP) and previous mayor of Şişli.
May	AREA	Mustafa Sarıgül	TDP	20.7	62.4	16.9	−41.1	Leader of Party of Change in Turkey (TDP) and previous mayor of Şişli.
2021
Oct	AREA	Mustafa Sarıgül	TDP	9.0	75.4	15.6	−66.4	Leader of Party of Change in Turkey (TDP) and previous mayor of Şişli.
Oct	AREA	Doğu Perinçek	VP	5.0	81.4	13.6	−76.4	President and presidential candidate of Patriotic Party (VP).
Aug	AREA	Abdullah Gül	IND	22.4	62.4	15.2	−40.0	Previous president of Turkey.
Mar	MetroPOLL	Abdullah Gül	IND	34.4	54.9	10.8	−20.5	Previous president of Turkey.
Mar	MetroPOLL	Tunç Soyer	CHP	27.3	43.0	29.7	−15.7	Mayor of İzmir.
Mar	MetroPOLL	Pervin Buldan	HDP	12.0	59.5	28.5	−47.5	Co-chairpeople of HDP.
Mar	MetroPOLL	Mithat Sancar	HDP	7.1	54.9	38.0	−47.8	Co-chairpeople of HDP.
2020
Dec	AREA	Abdullah Gül	IND	10.6	83.2	6.2	−72.6	Previous president of Turkey.
Dec	AREA	Doğu Perinçek	VP	2.1	90.3	7.5	−88.2	President and presidential candidate of Patriotic Party (VP).
Dec	MetroPOLL	Tunç Soyer	CHP	31.4	50.8	17.8	−19.4	Mayor of İzmir.
Dec	MetroPOLL	Abdullah Gül	IND	24.5	68.3	7.2	−43.8	Previous president of Turkey.
2019
