= Alperen Hearths =

Ultranationalist organization in Turkey

Alperen Hearths Foundation for Education, Culture, and Solidarity (Alperen Ocakları Eğitim Kültür ve Dayanışma Vakfı)
- Leader: Mustafa Destici
- Founded: 1 October 1992
- Split from: Ülkü Ocakları
- Group: Idealism (Turkey)
- Headquarters: Hamamönü, Altındağ, Ankara, Turkey
- Ideology: Turkish-Islamic nationalism; Turanism; Idealism; Pan-Turkism; Islamokemalism; Neo-Ottomanism; National conservatism
- Part of: (Turkey) Great Unity Party
- Wars: first Chechen war 2016 Turkish coup attempt Syrian civil war
- Website: alperenocaklari.org.tr

Alperen Hearths (Turkish: Alperen Ocakları, lit. 'Hero-Saint Hearths'), officially the Alperen Hearths Foundation for Education, Culture, and Solidarity (Turkish: Alperen Ocakları Eğitim Kültür ve Dayanışma Vakfı) or simply known as Alperens, are a far-right youth organization affiliated with the Great Unity Party in Turkey.

== History ==
It was established on 1 October 1992, by the order of Muhsin Yazıcıoğlu. Servet Avcı was the first chairman. In July 1994, Avcı handed over his chairmanship to Emir Kuşdemir, who later handed it to Süleyman Doğan.

During the Chechen war, aid campaigns and protests were organized by the Alperens across Turkey to support Chechnya. The visit of Boutros Boutros-Gali to Turkey was prevented by the protests of the Alperens on the grounds that the situation of Muslims in Bosnia, Palestine, Algeria and Chechnya was ignored. Süleyman Doğan handed over his chairmanship to Yavuz Ağıralioğlu in December 1995. In March 1996, the Alperens started the process of becoming the "Nizam-ı Alem Ocakları Vakfı". On 8 March 1997, Yavuz Ağıralioğlu handed over his chairmanship to Tuna Koç, who was the Aegean Region President of the organization. In February 2000, Tuna Koç, the chairman, handed over his duties to Yüksel Türkay. During this period, the name of the organization was changed to "Alperen Hearths".

Serkan Tüzün, who took office on 12 July 2006, handed over his chairmanship to Eyüp Gökhan Özekin. Özekin, who carried out important activities in the name of creating a corporate identity for the Alperen Hearths, also attended Kosovo visits with the then BBP Chairman Muhsin Yazıcıoğlu and made various contacts. Özekin, who also organized a charity night for Chechnya, handed over his duty of general chairmanship to Abdullah Gürgür on 20 December 2008. Murat Aslan, who took office in November 2015, handed over his five-year chairmanship to Samet Bağcı on 21 December 2019. Bağcı is currently the chairman of the Alperen Ocakları Education Culture and Solidarity Foundation.

In 2015, the Alperen Hearths claimed to have sent at least 250 fighters to Syria to defend Syrian Turkmen during the Syrian civil war, although they were accused of just going there to do a photo op to gain support, as many of the alleged Alperen Hearths who went to Syria to fight were seen in Istanbul just a few days after they had gone to fight.

== Ideology ==
Alperen Hearths adhere to Turkish nationalism with a mix of Sunni Islam, an ideology which is criticized by Islamists who view nationalism as a sin and by nationalists who view religion as unimportant. When Islam and nationalism are thought to contradict each other, while the MHP and its Grey Wolves choose nationalism, the BBP and its Alperen Hearths choose Islam. The Alperens and the BBP's goal was affirmed by Yazıcıoğlu as: "our cause is 'we love the creation because of the creator'. We do not separate people as Laz, Circassian, or Kurdish, we will not separate them. We are people living in the same land and under the same flag. Kurds are our brother, PKK is our enemy. We need to see this difference. We are against gangs, the mafia, and a junta. We want to have real deputies in the TBMM. Let the legislate, the executive, the judiciary be separate. Limit immunities. Let the speech of politicians on the podium be free. The party of the politician who gave his opinion should not be closed." About Ergenekon he said "If there is a junta, if there is a gang, let it all be engraved. Let Turkey really be a democratic country". Muhsin Yazıcıoğlu and Mustafa Kemal Atatürk are also their role models.

== See also ==
- Idealist Hearths
