= Abdullah Zeydan =

Kurdish politician

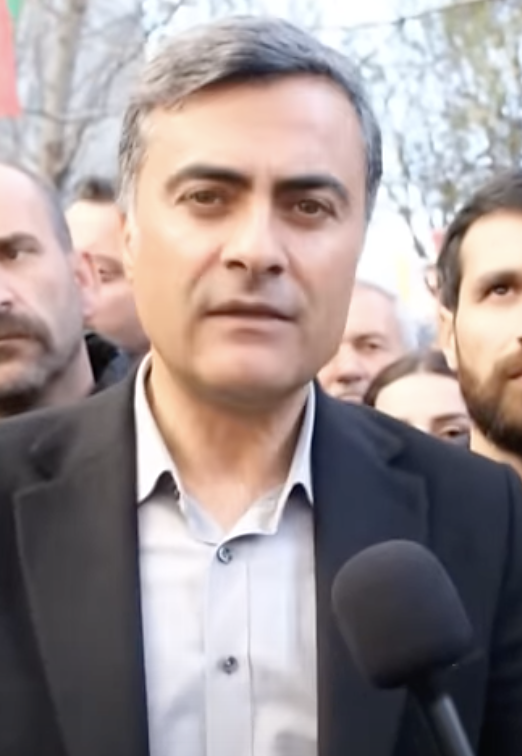

Mayor of Van
- In office 5 April 2024 – 15 February 2025
- Preceded by: Ozan Balcı
- Succeeded by: Ozan Balcı

Member of the Grand National Assembly of Turkey
- In office June 2015 – November 2016
- Constituency: Hakkari

Personal details
- Born: 13 March 1972 (age 54) Yüksekova
- Party: HDP; DEM Party
- Parent: Mustafa Zeydan

Abdullah Zeydan (born 13 March 1972 in Yüksekova) is a Kurdish politician from Turkey and a member of the Peoples' Equality and Democracy Party (DEM Party).

== Education ==
He attended primary school and high school in Yüksekova in the Hakkari Province.

== Political career ==
Abdullah Zeydan was elected as a member of the Grand National Assembly of Turkey in the general elections of June 2015 representing Hakkari and re-elected on the snap elections in November of the same year. Zeydan, running on a pro-Kurdish DEM party ticket, came first in the Van local election held on 31 March 2024, but the Diyarbakır 5th High Criminal Court annulled his election as mayor of the city with a decision taken on 4 April 2024. Zeydan appealed to the Supreme Election Board and was instated as mayor.

== Judicial prosecution ==
In 2015, he was criticized for saying "(If PKK wanted,) PKK would drown you in spit" then he was imprisoned on 4 November 2016 together with fellow HDP deputies and charged for having attended funerals of members of the Kurdistan Workers' Party (PKK) but also the Peoples Protections Forces (YPG) who fought against the Islamic State of Iraq and the Levant (ISIL). Zeydan was imprisoned in the F-type prison in Edirne together with Selahattin Demirtaş, with whom he joined a hunger strike in protest of the detention conditions in March 2017. He also joined a hunger strike in protest of the detention conditions of Abdullah Öcalan, which was initiated by Leyla Güven. He was to take part in it for 10 days. He was punished for this the same month by the prison authorities, but Abdullah Öcalan was permitted a visit of his brother days after Zeydan joined the hunger strike. In January 2018, Zeydan was sentenced to 8 years imprisonment for allegedly supporting a "terrorist" organization and making "terrorist" propaganda. In November 2019, a court ruled he be released. But this decision was opposed by the prosecutor of Diyarbakır on the same day, after which the court reconsidered and decided to keep him imprisoned. The State Prosecutor to the Court of Cassation in Turkey Bekir Şahin filed a lawsuit before the Constitutional Court on 17 March 2021, demanding a five-year ban from participating in politics for Zeydan and 686 other HDP politicians. The lawsuit was filed together with the request for a closure of the HDP due to the party's alleged organizational links with the PKK.

On 6 January 2022, after having attended a hearing in Elâzığ, Zeydan was released from prison.

== Personal life ==
He is married to Dilsah Zeydan and the couple has three daughters. He is the son of Mustafa Zeydan, a former deputy of the Justice and Development Party (AKP).
