= Zekeriya Yapıcıoğlu =

Kurdish politician (born 1966)

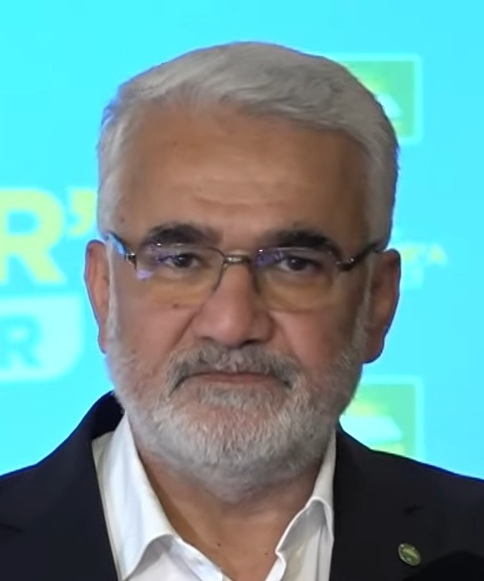

Member of the Grand National Assembly
- Incumbent
- Assumed office 3 June 2023
- Constituency: İstanbul (III) (2023)

Leader of the Free Cause Party
- Incumbent
- Assumed office 6 June 2021
- Preceded by: İshak Sağlam
- In office 30 June 2013 – 21 May 2018
- Preceded by: Mehmet Hüseyin Yılmaz
- Succeeded by: Mehmet Yavuz

Personal details
- Born: 1966 (age 59–60) Batman, Turkey
- Party: Free Cause Party
- Education: Lawyer, politician
- Alma mater: Ankara University, Law School

Zekeriya Yapıcıoğlu (born 1966; Batman) is a Kurdish Turkish politician and lawyer who led the Kurdish Islamist Free Cause Party from June 2013 to May 2018 and again from June 2021 on.

== Biography ==
Born in 1966 in the city of Batman in the southeastern part of Turkey, he worked as a lawyer from 1990 to 2012 after finishing his education as a lawyer in Ankara. He co-founded the Free Cause Party in 2013 in an attempt to consolidate the conservative Kurdish vote. Yapıcıoğlu had previously been a supporter of Kurdish Hezbollah and also stated that the cause of Hüda-Par was the continuation of that of Sheikh Said.

Yapıcıoğlu is Anti-Darwinian and generally uses Islamic rhetoric in his speeches. Moreover, he is against the Kurdistan Workers' Party, anti-America and also criticized the ruling Justice and Development Party's policies and their failure in bringing peace to Kurdish areas.

== Electoral history ==
Yapıcıoğlu ran unsuccessfully as an independent twice in 2015 and in 2018 in the district of Diyarbakır and received 3.4% and 4.3% of the vote share respectively.

Election	District	Votes	%	Results
General elections, June 2015	Diyarbakır	27,537	3.4%	Not elected
General elections, 2018	Diyarbakır	35,239	4.3%	Not elected
