= Free Cause Party =

Free Cause Party Hür Dava Partisi
- Abbreviation: HÜDA PAR
- Leader: Zekeriya Yapıcıoğlu
- Founded: 17 December 2012
- Headquarters: Ehl-i Beyt Mah. Ceyhun Atıf Kansu Cad. Nehir Apt. No: 117-5 Balgat, Çankaya, Ankara
- Military wing: Kurdish Hezbollah (denied by the party)
- Membership (2026): ▲16,939
- Ideology: Kurdish-Islamic synthesis; Sunni Islamism; Pan-Islamism; Social conservatism; Kurdish nationalism; Kurdish minority rights; Federalism; Sunni-Shia unity
- Political position: Far-right
- Colors: Green; Yellow; White
- Grand National Assembly: 4 / 600
- Belde Municipalities: 1 / 388
- Municipal Assemblies: 23 / 20,953

Website
- hudapar.org

The Free Cause Party (Turkish: Hür Dava Partisi, HÜDA PAR; (Note: Hüdâ translates to "God", or perhaps more accurately "The Lord", a substitution for the word Allah. Therefore, the party's self-styled abbreviation reads "Party of God".) Kurdish: Partiya Doza Azad) is a Kurdish Sunni Islamist political party in Turkey. It is centered in the city of Batman, Turkey.

== History ==
=== Roots ===
Following the decision to end armed struggle in 2002, activists of the Hizbullah's Menzil group founded an association called "Solidarity with the Oppressed" (Turkish: Mustazaflar ile Dayanışma Derneği or short Mustazaf-Der) in 2003. (Note: Not to be confused with Kurdish Revolutionary Hezbollah or Kurdish Hezbollah of Iran.) It also became known as the Movement of the Oppressed (Turkish: Mustazaflar Hareketi). On 18 April 2010, Mustazaf Der organized a mass meeting in Diyarbakır to celebrate the anniversary of the Islamic prophet Muhammad's birthday (known as Mawlid). The Turkish police estimated that the event was attended by 2 million people. The organizers put the figure at over 2.5 million people.

On 20 April 2010, a court in Diyarbakır ordered the closure of the Association for the Oppressed (Mustazaf-Der) on the grounds that it was “conducting activities on behalf of the terrorist organization Hizbollah.” The decision was confirmed by the Court of Cassation on 11 May 2012.

In late 2012, the Movement of the Oppressed announced its will to found a political party, to challenge the hegemony of the left-wing and Kurdish nationalist Peace and Democracy Party. On 17 December 2012, the Free Cause Party (Hür Dava Partisi) was founded. On 9 January 2013, the general headquarters in Ankara was opened.

Societies affiliated with HÜDA PAR operate under the umbrella organisation Lovers of the Prophet (Turkish: Peygamber Sevdalıları, Kurdish: Evindarên Pêyxamber) particularly active in Kurdish Mawlid meetings.

Following the 2014 Kobanî protests and the collapse of the 2013–2015 PKK–Turkey peace process, both part of the broader third phase of the Kurdish–Turkish conflict, riots erupted across Kurdish regions of Turkey. Amnesty International accused HÜDA PAR of collaborating with Turkish police to violently suppress these uprisings, using excessive force that resulted in numerous deaths, particularly in Batman.

The party supported the ruling People's Alliance in the elections of 2023. The party cooperated with AKP in some cities in the local elections of 2024.

== Ideology and policies ==
The party has been described as "an extreme Islamist party" and as "the political wing of the Iranian-backed Kurdish Hizbullah". The Association for Solidarity with Mustazafs (Turkish: Oppressed) (Mustazaf-Der) was established in 2004 to support those arrested and their families as a result of the police operation named as Beykoz Operation targeting Hezbollah. The association was closed in 2012 on the grounds that it was a continuation of Hezbollah. After the association was closed, then, since it was difficult to close political parties in Turkey, Movement of the Oppressed (Turkish: Mustazaflar Hareketi) continued its activities by founding the Free Cause Party.

Free Cause Party calls for the constitutional recognition of the Kurds and Kurdish language, mother tongue education, the end to the 10 percent election threshold, and the decentralization of state power and strengthening of local administration. The party also advocates for restrictions on the freedom of religion and worship to be lifted, the headscarf ban ended, wants adultery criminalized, and religious marriages to be recognized. Moreover, the party demands that the Turkish state apologize to Kurds and reinstate the original names of Kurdish-populated places. The party has largely been silent on the question of Kurdish autonomy or independence from Turkey. The party is opposed to LGBT rights, and routinely denounces the HDP, a left-wing party supporting Kurdish minority rights, for supporting it. Despite forming from a splinter group that made promises to end armed struggle, third-party sources describe the party as strongly affiliated with the Kurdish Hezbollah. The party denies these allegations as they have condemned violence multiple times and rejected any links with militant groups. Some have pointed out that the party's abbreviation, "Hüda-Par", is synonymous with "Hezbollah", both meaning "Party of God". The party accuse allegations of terrorism against HÜDA PAR and DEM Party as unlawful.

== Elections ==
The party supported Erdoğan in the 2018 presidential elections and again in 2023. Since its creation in 2012, HÜDA PAR has contested the two parliamentary elections of June 2015 and 2018, while it chose not to run for the November 2015 elections. The party entered the 2023 Turkish general election as part of the Justice and Development Party list. Four Free Cause Party members of the Grand National Assembly of Turkey were elected. In 2024 Turkish local elections, the party supported candidates of Justice and Development Party in major cities such as Istanbul, Ankara and İzmir. The party showed its strongest performance in the cities of Batman and Bingöl, gathering more than 10 percent of the votes.

=== Election results ===
Grand National Assembly of Turkey
Election	Leader	Votes			Seats		Government
Election	Leader	#	%	Rank	#	±	Government
June 2015	Zekeriya Yapıcıoğlu	70,121	0.16%	11	0 / 550	–	Extra-parliamentary
2018	Mehmet Yavuz	155,539	0.31%	7th	0 / 600	–	Extra-parliamentary
2023	Zekeriya Yapıcıoğlu	Part of AK Party			4 / 600	▲4	Providing confidence and supply

=== Provincial results (2015 and 2018) ===
Results

Votes obtained by Hüda-Par in the general elections of 2015 and 2018 by province

Province	2015	Percent	2018	Percent
Adana	3,118	0.3%	6,992	0.5%
Adıyaman	—	—	4,249	1.3%
Afyon	—	—	977	0.2%
Ağrı	—	—	1,731	0.8%
Aksaray	—	—	639	0.3%
Amasya	—	—	359	0.2%
Ankara	—	—	3,724	0.1%
Antalya	—	—	3,131	0.2%
Ardahan	—	—	203	0.4%
Artvin	—	—	325	0.3%
Aydın	—	—	1,795	0.3%
Balıkesir	—	—	1,500	0.2%
Bartın	—	—	345	0.3%
Batman	14,551	5.5%	15,998	5.6%
Bayburt	—	—	77	0.2%
Bilecik	—	—	454	0.3%
Bingöl	5,424	4.2%	6,296	4.5%
Bitlis	1,709	1.1%	1,809	1.1%
Bolu	—	—	374	0.2%
Burdur	—	—	564	0.3%
Bursa	—	—	4,426	0.1%
Çanakkale	—	—	699	0.2%
Çankırı	—	—	203	0.2%
Çorum	—	—	620	0.2%
Denizli	—	—	1,714	0.3%
Diyarbakır	27,537	3.4%	35,239	4.3%
Düzce	—	—	303	0.1%
Edirne	—	—	607	0.2%
Elazığ	—	—	5,197	1.5%
Erzincan	—	—	138	0.1%
Erzurum	—	—	833	0.2%
Eskişehir	—	—	758	0.1%
Gaziantep	—	—	8,703	0.9%
Giresun	—	—	802	0.3%
Gümüşhane	—	—	220	0.3%
Hakkari	—	—	792	0.6%
Hatay	—	—	1,511	0.2%
Iğdır	—	—	198	0.2%
Isparta	—	—	710	0.3%
Istanbul	—	—	16,600	0.1%
İzmir	—	—	4,725	0.1%
Kahramanmaraş	—	—	1,531	0.2%
Karabük	—	—	323	0.2%
Karaman	—	—	356	0.2%
Kars	—	—	424	0.3%
Kastamonu	—	—	727	0.3%
Kayseri	—	—	1,479	0.2%
Kırıkkale	—	—	292	0.2%
Kırklareli	—	—	358	0.1%
Kırşehir	—	—	254	0.2%
Kilis	—	—	177	0.2%
Kocaeli	—	—	1,843	0.2%
Konya	—	—	2,787	0.2%
Kütahya	—	—	811	0.2%
Malatya	—	—	1,619	0.3%
Manisa	—	—	2,545	0.3%
Mardin	5,312	1.4%	8,253	2.1%
Mersin	—	—	4,486	0.4%
Muğla	—	—	1,378	0.2%
Muş	—	—	2,784	1.5%
Nevşehir	—	—	551	0.3%
Niğde	—	—	443	0.2%
Ordu	—	—	1,244	0.3%
Osmaniye	—	—	1,157	0.4%
Rize	—	—	228	0.1%
Sakarya	—	—	856	0.1%
Samsun	—	—	1,218	0.1%
Siirt	—	—	1,776	1.2%
Sinop	—	—	444	0.3%
Sivas	—	—	532	0.1%
Şanlıurfa	6,551	0.9%	13,495	1.6%
Şırnak	2,826	1.3%	4,847	2.1%
Tekirdağ	—	—	904	0.1%
Tokat	—	—	615	0.2%
Trabzon	—	—	615	0.1%
Tunceli	—	—	57	0.1%
Uşak	—	—	604	0.3%
Van	3,093	0.6%	4,753	0.9%
Yalova	—	—	286	0.2%
Yozgat	—	—	443	0.2%
Zonguldak	—	—	815	0.2%

== See also ==
- List of Islamic political parties
- 2023 Adana attack
