= Mustafa Destici =

Turkish politician (born 1966)

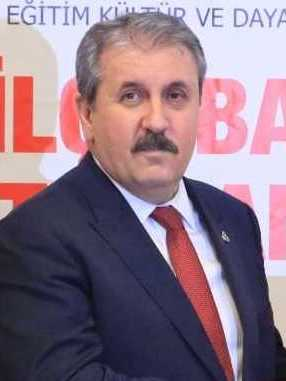

Leader of the Great Unity Party
- Incumbent
- Assumed office 3 July 2011

Member of the Grand National Assembly
- In office 8 July 2018 – 7 April 2023
- Constituency: Ankara (II) (2018)

Personal details
- Born: 3 February 1966 (age 60) Günyüzü, Eskişehir, Turkey
- Spouse: Şükriye Destici
- Children: 3

Mustafa Destici (born 1966) is a Turkish politician who is the leader of the Great Unity Party (BBP) since 2011.

== Early life and education ==
He was born in 1966 in Günyüzü, Eskişehir. He completed his primary and secondary education in Günyüzü and Sivrihisar, and graduated from Ankara Central Imam Hatip High School. In 1988, he graduated from the Faculty of Theology at Ankara University, and worked as a teacher until 1993. He completed his master's degree in the History of Philosophy at the Social Sciences Institute of Gazi University.

In the same year, he became a research assistant at the Social Sciences Institute of Gazi University and worked as an academic in the Department of Philosophy at Gazi University until 2000.

== Career ==
In 2000, he joined the Ministry of Agriculture and worked there as an “educator” until 2007.

During this period, he conducted scientific studies on the “Turkish National Education System” and “Food and Agriculture.”

He served as the Founding Deputy Chairman of the Youth Culture and Art Centers and held managerial positions in Bizim Ocak, Nizam-ı Alem Ocakları, and Alperen Ocakları. During this time, he wrote articles for Bizim Ocak, later for Nizam-ı Alem and Alperen magazines, as well as for Gündüz newspaper.

On April 15, 2007, at the 2nd Extraordinary Grand Congress of the Great Unity Party, upon the request of the late Chairman Muhsin Yazıcıoğlu, he resigned from his 17-year civil service career and joined the Great Unity Party. He was elected as a member of the Central Decision and Executive Board and became Deputy Chairman.

After the martyrdom of the late leader Muhsin Yazıcıoğlu, he was re-elected as a member of the Central Decision and Executive Board at the Extraordinary Grand Congress held on May 24, 2009, and became the Secretary General of the party.

On July 3, 2011, at the 4th Extraordinary Congress, Mustafa Destici was elected as the Chairman of the Great Unity Party. In the 2018 General Elections, he entered the Parliament as a 27th Term Ankara Member of Parliament and served for five years.
