= Muhsin Yazıcıoğlu =

Turkish politician (1954–2009)

1st Leader of Great Unity Party
- In office 29 January 1993 – 25 March 2009
- Succeeded by: Yalçın Topçu

Member of the Grand National Assembly
- In office 22 July 2007 – 25 March 2009
- In office 20 October 1991 – 18 April 1999
- Constituency: Sivas (1991, 1995, 2007)

Personal details
- Born: December 31, 1954 Şarkışla, Sivas Province, Turkey
- Died: March 25, 2009 (aged 54) Göksun, Kahramanmaraş Province, Turkey
- Party: Nationalist Movement Party (1977–1980) Nationalist Task Party (1987–1993) Great Unity Party (1993–2009)
- Spouse: Gülefer Yazıcıoğlu
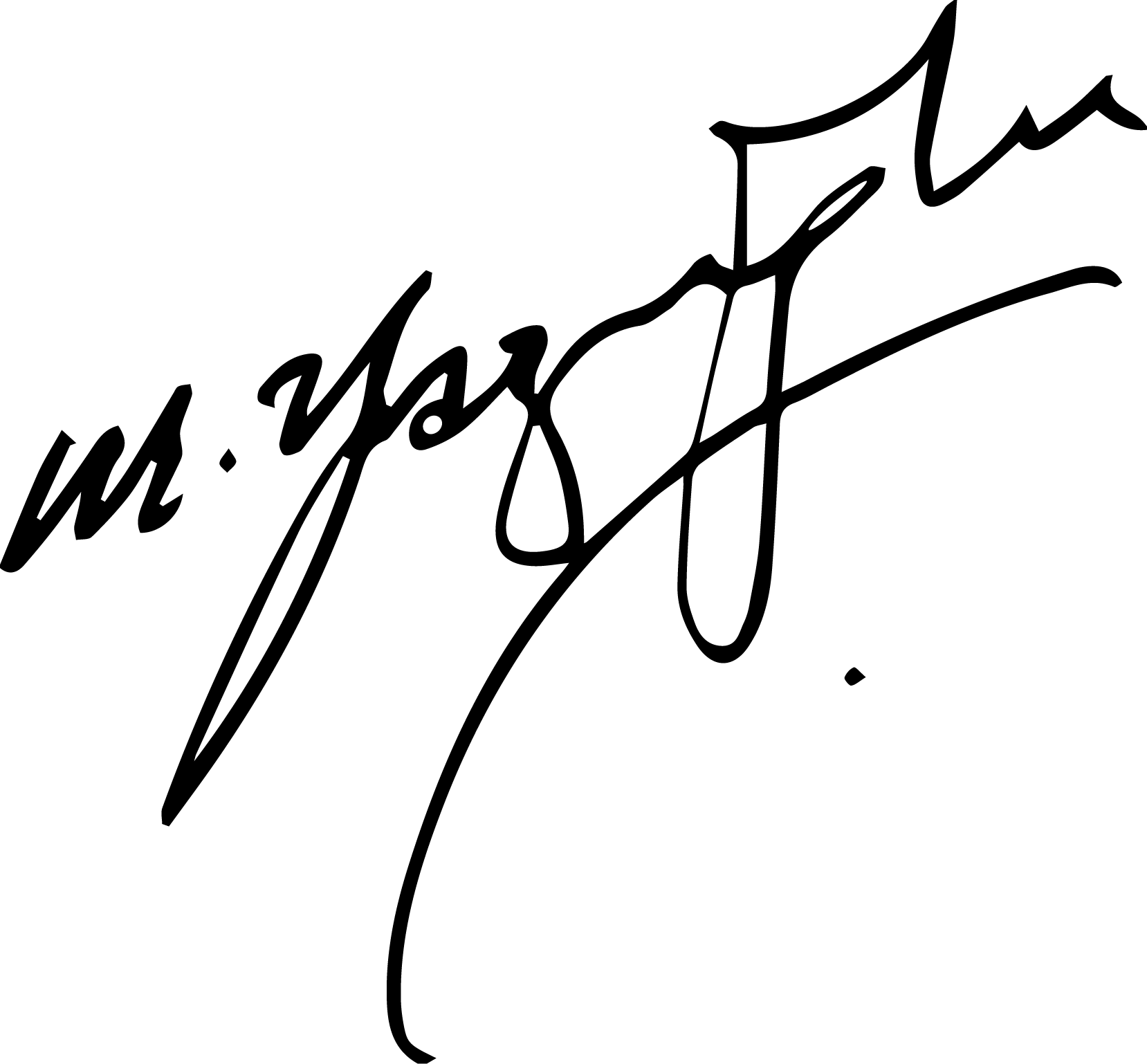
- Signature

Muhsin Yazıcıoğlu (December 31, 1954 – March 25, 2009) was a Turkish politician and member of the Parliament of Turkey. He was the leader and founder of the Great Unity Party (BBP), a right-wing nationalist-Islamist political party.

== Biography ==
Yazıcıoğlu was born 1954 in a small village named Elmalı in Şarkışla of Sivas Province. He studied in Şarkışla from primary school to high school after that he was educated at the Faculty of Veterinary Medicine in Ankara University. He was a member of the ultranationalist Grey Wolves. After the 1980 Turkish coup d'état, Yazıcıoğlu was arrested for being one of the leaders of Grey Wolves. He stayed for seven years in prison until his release in 1987. In the following years, Yazıcıoğlu was involved in politics as a member of the far-right Nationalist Movement Party. In 1991, he and some of his fellows left this movement and established a new political party called Great Unity Party with a more Islamist ideology.

His party has been represented in the Parliament only via electoral coalitions with popular parties. At the 2002 legislative elections, the party won 1.1% of the popular vote and no seats; in the 2007 elections Muhsin Yazıcıoğlu was elected as an independent.

=== Death ===
Yazıcıoğlu died on March 25, 2009, in a suspicious helicopter crash in the southern Turkish province of Kahramanmaraş, after a political rally there on the way to the next rally in Yozgat just four days before the local elections. The pilot and three other passengers also died in the accident. After the crash, İsmail Güneş who was one of the passengers, called the Turkish emergency service number 112 and was able to talk to the dispatcher clearly. Güneş made several calls to emergency services, but the helicopter wreck was not found in time. Later, the officials involved were investigated and charged with several crimes including negligence of duty, with the lack of/delayed response being blamed on the Gülen movement having infiltrated government institutions.

Yazıcıoğlu received a state funeral to which most of the party leaders attended. Thousands of people joined his funeral ceremony in Kocatepe Mosque in Ankara. After his death, in the 2009 local elections the BBP's candidate was elected as the new mayor of Sivas.

Party political offices
Preceded by founder	Leader of the Great Unity Party (BBP); Jan 29, 1993–Mar 25, 2009	Succeeded by Yalçın Topçu
