= Great Unity Party =

Turkish political party

Great Unity Party Büyük Birlik Partisi
- Abbreviation: BBP
- Leader: Mustafa Destici
- Founded: 29 January 1993
- Split from: Nationalist Task Party
- Headquarters: Ankara
- Youth wing: Alperen Hearths
- Membership (2026): ▲115,049
- Ideology: Turkish–Islamic synthesis Sunni Islamism; Turkish ultranationalism Islamokemalism; Social conservatism National conservatism
- Political position: Far-right
- National affiliation: People's Alliance
- Colors: Red; White; Ruby Red (customary)
- Grand National Assembly: 0 / 600
- Metropolitan municipalities: 0 / 30
- Provinces: 1 / 51
- District municipalities: 14 / 973
- Belde Municipalities: 5 / 390
- Provincial councillors: 11 / 1,282
- Municipal Assemblies: 261 / 20,953

Website
- www.bbp.org.tr

The Great Unity Party (Turkish: Büyük Birlik Partisi, BBP) is a far-right Sunni Islamist and ultranationalist political party in Turkey. It was created on 29 January 1993 by Muhsin Yazıcıoğlu, who broke off from the Nationalist Task Party (predecessor of the modern MHP) after a quarrel with Alparslan Türkeş. The BBP's youth wing is the Alperen Hearths.

== History ==
Although it is claimed that the founder of the party Muhsin Yazıcıoğlu left the Nationalist Movement Party (Turkish: Milliyetçi Hareket Partisi, MHP) for lack of religious convictions, this should be seen rather as a speculation as Muhsin Yazıcıoğlu rarely blamed the MHP or talked about the separation. The rift between Muhsin Yazıcıoğlu and Alparslan Türkeş actually started after the 1980 Turkish coup d'état. Alparslan Türkeş defended himself in the infamous speech in which he declared "My opinions and beliefs are of the same as the generals who organized the 1980 Turkish coup d'état, yet I am in prison" speech during trials after the coup. The ideological separation started then and reached the surface after Alparslan Türkeş dismissed the Ankara headquarters of the MHP after the 1992 MHP Congress. The delegates had elected the candidate supported by Muhsin Yazıcıoğlu rather than the candidate of Alparslan Türkeş environment. Türkeş's dismissal, seen to show an anti-democratic approach, was the final blow to the relationship between the young circle who had suffered during the 1980 coup, and the old guard which circled around Alparslan Türkeş.

The party has been represented in the Parliament only via electoral coalitions with popular parties. At the 2002 legislative elections, the party won 1.1% of the popular vote and no seats; in the 2007 elections Muhsin Yazıcıoğlu was elected as an independent. In 2009 local elections the BBP's candidate was elected as the new mayor of Sivas.

=== 2009 helicopter crash and death of Muhsin Yazıcıoğlu ===
On 25 March 2009, the leader of the BBP, Muhsin Yazıcıoğlu, died in a helicopter crash in south-eastern Turkey. A large search and rescue operation was conducted in the mountainous area around Göksun in Kahramanmaraş Province. The helicopter wreckage was found 47 hours after the crash, and all six people on board were found dead. İsmail Güneş, a reporter of the Ihlas News Agency, who was accompanying Yazıcıoğlu, initially survived the crash and placed a desperate call for help just after the crash, and reported a broken leg. By the time the search party located the crash site in the inclement weather, all six aboard, including Güneş, were dead. Yazıcıoğlu had been traveling from Çağlayancerit in Kahramanmaraş Province to Yerköy in Yozgat Province in central Anatolia for another political rally before local elections on 29 March when the chartered helicopter crashed.

=== 2010 Gaza Freedom Flotilla ===
A delegation representing the BBP participated in the Gaza Freedom Flotilla on board the ship MV Mavi Marmara in May 2010.

== Ideology and political positions ==
Muhsin Yazıcıoğlu affirmed the BBP's goal for Turkey by saying: "our cause is 'we love the creation because of the creator'. We do not separate people as Laz, Circassian, or Kurdish, we will not separate them. We are people living in the same land and under the same flag. Kurds are our brother, PKK is our enemy. We need to see this difference. We are against gangs, the mafia, and a junta. We want to have real deputies in the TBMM. Let the legislate, the executive, the judiciary be separate. Limit immunities. Let the speech of politicians on the podium be free. The party of the politician who gave his opinion should not be closed." About Ergenekon he said "If there is a junta, if there is a gang, let it all be engraved. Let Turkey really be a democratic country".

In 2016, the Alperen Hearths threatened to stop the annual gay pride march in Istanbul. Alperen's Istanbul chief, Kürşat Mican, stated:

Degenerates will not be allowed to carry out their fantasies on this land...We're not responsible for what will happen after this point ... We do not want people to walk around half-naked with alcohol bottles in their hands in this sacred city watered by the blood of our ancestors.

== Party leaders ==
#	Leader (birth–death)	Took office	Left office
1	Muhsin Yazıcıoğlu (1954–2009)	29 January 1993	25 March 2009
2	Yalçın Topçu (1957–)	24 May 2009	12 June 2011
–	Hakkı Öznur (acting)	12 June 2011	3 July 2011
3	Mustafa Destici (1966–)	3 July 2011	7 April 2015
–	Hakkı Öznur (acting)	7 April 2015	12 July 2015
(3)	Mustafa Destici (1966–)	12 July 2015	Incumbent
