= Opinion polling for the 2023 Turkish parliamentary election =

In the run up to the 2023 Turkish parliamentary election, held on 14 May, various organizations carried out opinion polling to gauge voting intention in Turkey. Results of such polls are displayed in this article. These polls only include Turkish voters nationwide and do not take into account Turkish expatriates voting abroad. The date range for these opinion polls are from the previous general election, held on 24 June 2018, to the date of the 2023 election, held on 14 May 2023.

Poll results are listed in the tables below in reverse chronological order, showing the most recent first, and using the date the survey's fieldwork was done, as opposed to the date of publication. If such date is unknown, the date of publication is given instead. The highest percentage figure in each polling survey is displayed in bold, and the background shaded in the leading party's color. In the instance that there is a tie, then no figure is shaded. The lead column on the right shows the percentage-point difference between the two parties with the highest figures. When a specific poll does not show a data figure for a party, the party's cell corresponding to that poll is shown empty.

== Graphical summary ==
The chart below shows opinion polls conducted for the next Turkish general election. The trend lines are local regressions (LOESS).

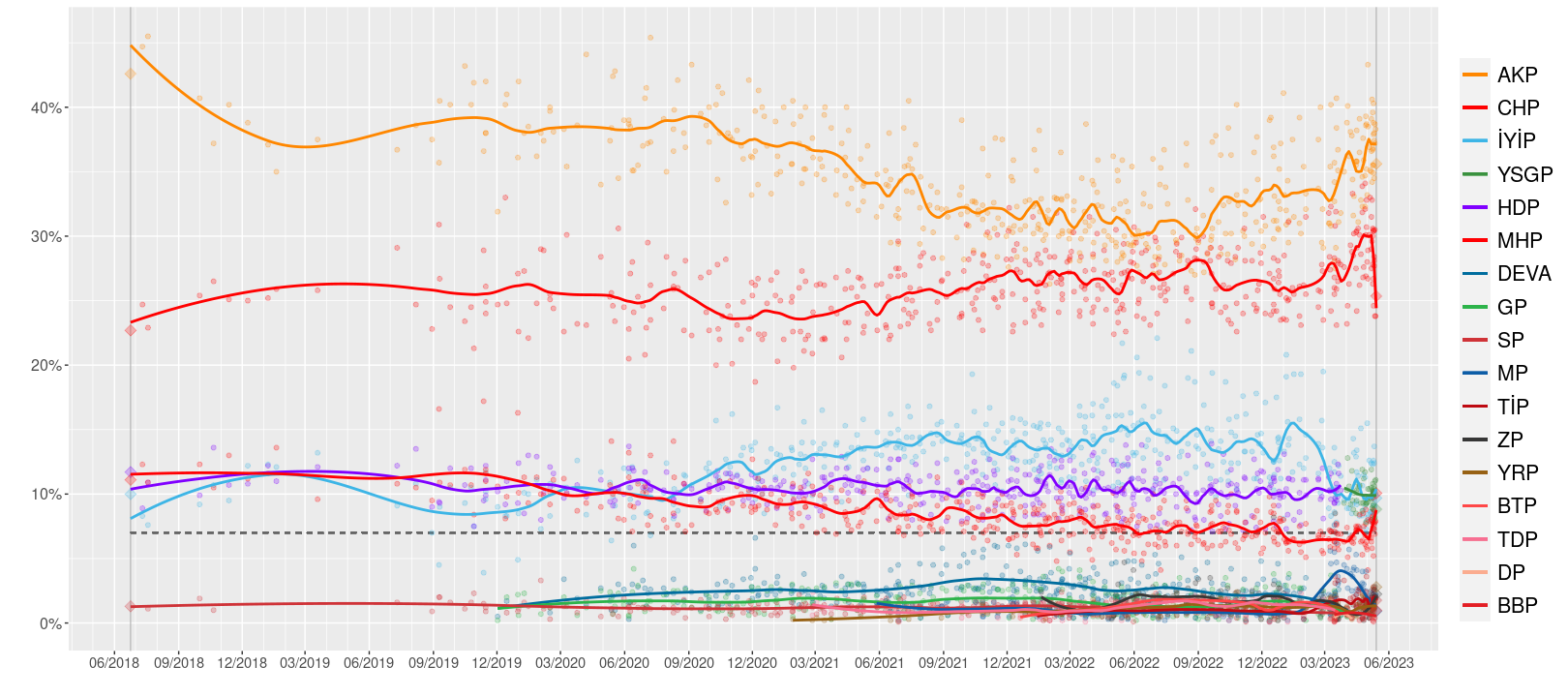

== Party vote ==
=== 2023 ===
Light red denotes polls that were released after the polling ban came into effect, thereby violating Turkish electoral law.

Fieldwork date	Polling firm / Published by	Sample size	PEOPLE					NATION			L&FA			ATA	No Alliances	Others	Lead
Fieldwork date	Polling firm / Published by	Sample size					Total			Total			Total			Others	Lead
Fieldwork date	Polling firm / Published by	Sample size	AKP (Note: Includes HÜDA PAR and DSP running on AKP list)	MHP	BBP	YRP	Total	CHP (Note: Includes SP, DEVA, GP, DP and TDP running on CHP list)	İYİ	Total	YSGP (Note: Includes HDP, EHP and TÖP running on YSGP list)	TİP (Note: Includes Greens' Party, UİD-DER and İDP running on TİP list)	Total	ZP	MP	Others	Lead
12–13 May	Özdemir	3,016	**38.3**	7.9	–	–	**46.2**	23.8	10.0	33.8	11.1	1.9	13.0	2.0	2.2	2.8	14.5
11–12 May	BETİMA	5,751	**38.7**	7.8	0.4	1.6	**48.5**	23.8	10.2	34.0	11.0	1.8	12.8	2.1	2.1	0.5	14.9
11–12 May	Areda Survey	25,000	**41.4**	8.9	0.4	1.6	**52.3**	26.0	7.5	33.5	9.2	1.5	10.7	1.9	1.1	0.5	15.4
9–12 May	Aksoy	4,000	**37.2**	6.9	–	1.2	**45.3**	30.5	9.1	39.6	8.2	2.0	10.2	2.8	1.2	2.0	6.7
9–12 May	TAG	2,190	**33.8**	6.8	–	–	40.6	28.7	14.6	**43.3**	9.8	1.6	11.4	1.1	–	2.7	5.1
May	HBS	5,910	**37.4**	7.7	–	–	**45.1**	28.1	12.4	40.5	10.4	–	10.4	–	–	4.0	9.3
10–11 May	ORC	3,920	**34.5**	7.3	–	–	41.8	28.4	13.7	**42.1**	10.6	–	10.6	–	–	5.5	7.1
May	Optimar	–	**38.0**	8.7	1.0	1.3	**49.0**	27.7	8.4	36.1	8.1	2.6	10.7	1.2	2.5	0.5	10.3
9–10 May	Yöneylem	2,476	**35.5**	7.8	–	1.1	**44.4**	30.4	9.6	40.0	10.2	2.6	12.8	1.6	–	1.2	5.1
9–10 May	MetroPOLL / Ankara Gazetecisi	2,038	**40.3**	5.2	–	–	**45.5**	30.5	8.6	39.1	10.1	1.6	11.7	–	1.1	2.6	9.8
7–10 May	ARGETUS	2,568	**38.8**	8.8	–	1.1	**48.7**	26.7	9.1	35.8	10.2	1.3	11.5	–	1.6	2.4	12.1
3–10 May	Remres	5,411	**34.9**	7.3	0.1	0.6	42.9	30.4	12.6	**43.0**	9.2	1.8	11.0	1.1	1.3	0.7	4.5
May	GENAR	–	**37.9**	10.2	–	1.3	**49.4**	24.6	9.8	34.4	10.0	2.8	12.8	1.5	1.5	0.4	13.3
8–9 May	Area	3,000	**36.8**	8.3	0.2	1.2	**46.5**	30.0	8.6	38.6	10.3	2.0	12.3	1.3	1.1	0.2	6.8
6–9 May	İEA	5,000	**36.7**	7.4	–	0.8	**44.9**	30.6	10.1	40.7	9.1	1.4	10.5	1.5	1.1	1.3	6.1
5–9 May	ALF	6,000	**35.5**	7.8	–	–	**43.3**	27.8	12.3	40.1	10.8	–	10.8	–	–	5.8	7.7
20 Apr–9 May	ADA	65,000	**39.6**	9.7	–	1.5	**50.8**	26.3	7.2	33.5	10.3	2.2	12.5	–	1.4	1.9	13.3
4–8 May	İvem	4,020	**40.6**	8.2	–	–	**48.8**	29.6	7.8	37.4	9.9	1.0	10.9	–	1.2	1.7	11.0
2–8 May	Bulgu	2,400	**34.2**	5.8	0.4	1.3	41.7	32.8	9.9	**42.7**	8.9	1.9	10.8	2.0	1.8	1.0	1.4
6–7 May	Gezici	3,577	**39.1**	6.3	–	–	**45.4**	29.0	8.0	37.0	9.6	1.6	11.2	2.5	2.3	1.6	10.1
6–7 May	KONDA	3,480	**35.0**	8.0	1.0		**44.0**	27.3	12.4	39.9 (Note: "others" 0.2)	10.5	1.8	12.3	–	–	3.8	7.7
3–7 May	SAROS	8,164	**36.6**	6.6	–	0.7	**43.9**	31.5	8.6	40.1	11.9	1.3	13.2	0.7	0.7	1.3	5.1
27 Apr–5 May	Avrasya	5,600	**35.1**	7.9	–	1.1	**44.1**	33.0	8.6	41.6	9.7	1.5	11.2	0.9	1.1	1.1	2.1
26 Apr–4 May	MAK / Kamuoyu Analizi	5,750	**36.9**	6.6	0.7	1.0	**45.2**	30.1	12.6	42.7	10.4	0.4	10.8	0.4	0.9	0.0	6.8
4 May 2023			**A pre-election ban on opinion polling comes into effect, ten days before election day**.														
27 Apr–3 May	AR-G	2,231	**33.3**	6.8	–	0.9	41.0	31.1	13.3	**44.4**	9.3	2.5	11.5	0.7	1.7	0.6	2.2
26 Apr–3 May	Özdemir	5,916	**39.4**	8.0	–	–	**47.4**	24.7	8.7	33.4	9.6	2.6	12.2	1.6	2.4	3.0	14.6
28 Apr–2 May	İvem	4,156	**43.3**	4.1	–	1.5	**47.4**	28.9	8.4	37.3	10.4	1.3	11.7	–	1.6	2.0	14.4
27 Apr–2 May	ASAL	2,523	**38.5**	8.0	–	1.5	**48.0**	26.7	8.2	34.9	9.4	1.8	11.2	–	2.1	3.8	11.8
29 Apr–1 May	ORC	3,950	**33.2**	5.7	1.6	1.3	41.8	28.0	15.5	**43.5**	9.6	2.0	11.6	–	1.9	1.2	5.2
27–30 Apr	Yöneylem / T24	2,594	**35.2**	6.3	–	1.6	**43.1**	30.7	9.8	40.5	9.3	3.6	12.9	1.4	1.5	0.6	4.5
25–30 Apr	SAROS	7,284	**38.7**	5.9	–	1.0	**45.6**	32.8	7.9	40.7	9.3	1.6	10.9	0.5	1.5	0.9	5.9
26–29 Apr	ADA	3,278	**39.3**	8.8	–	1.4	**49.5**	26.9	7.3	34.2	9.2	2.4	11.6	–	2.5	2.2	12.4
25–29 Apr	Optimar	3,005	**38.6**	7.7	1.0	1.0	**48.3**	30.1	7.0	37.1	7.8	1.3	9.1	0.9	4.0	0.7	8.5
26–28 Apr	Aksoy	1,537	**34.7**	6.8	–	–	**41.5**	32.1	9.0	41.1	9.6	1.9	10.5	–	–	5.9	2.6
24–28 Apr	Sosyo Politik	1,569	32.3	6.1	–	–	38.4	**33.8** (Note: CHP – 28.7, DEVA – 3.1, GP – 1.1, SP – 0.9)	11.3	**45.1**	11.7	1.1	12.8	2.0	1.4	0.3	1.5
25–27 Apr	Areda Survey	14,193	**41.3**	8.8	0.4	1.5	**52.0**	26.0	7.0	33.0	8.7	1.7	10.4	1.4	2.8	0.4	15.3
23–26 Apr	TEAM	3,054	**35.9**	7.5	0.3	1.1	**44.8**	27.6	11.5	39.1	11.2	1.2	12.4	0.2	3.0	0.6	8.3
17–25 Apr	TÜSİAR	4,223	**37.6**	8.5	0.5	2.1	**48.7**	26.8	8.7	35.5	9.3	1.8	11.1	1.0	2.6	1.2	10.8
?–25 Apr	Bulgu / Sözcü	2,400	**34.6** (Note: AKP – 34.3, HÜDA PAR – 0.3)	5.3	0.4	1.5	41.8	33.8 (Note: CHP – 33.0, SP – 0.7, GP – 0.1, DEVA – 0.0)	8.3	**42.1**	8.7	2.3	11.0	0.4	4.0	0.5 (Note: Left Party – 0.3, Patriotic Party – 0.1, Young Party – 0.1, Nation Party – 0.0, Communist Party of Turkey – 0.0, Independent Turkey Party – 0.0)	0.8
17–24 Apr	Artıbir	1,500	**32.3**	6.4	0.9	2.2	**41.8**	31.4	10.2	41.6	11.9	1.3	13.2	0.3	3.1	0.0	0.9
19–22 Apr	ORC	3,920	**32.8**	6.3	–	1.2	40.3	28.6	15.1	**43.7**	9.3	1.4	10.7	0.9	2.7	1.7	4.2
15–20 Apr	Areda Survey / Yeni Şafak	17,400	**41.1**	8.8	0.4	1.5	**51.8**	25.4	6.9	32.3	10.1	1.1	11.2	1.1	3.3	0.3	15.7
12–20 Apr	Area	10,277	**36.5**	8.4	0.2	1.1	**46.1**	30.1	8.3	38.3	10.7	1.5	12.3	–	–	3.3	6.4
Apr	Genar / En Sor Haber	–	**39.1**	7.3	–	1.6	**48.0**	26.2	7.4	33.6	10.6	2.7	13.3	–	2.6	2.5	12.9
14–16 Apr	Yöneylem	2,422	**35.8**	7.4	–	0.5	**43.7**	30.4	9.2	39.6	10.3	2.2	12.5	–	2.6	1.6	5.4
Apr	Aksoy	1,067	**31.1**	7.5	–	–	38.6	30.6	11.4	**42.0**	10.5	2.5	13.0	–	–	6.4	0.5
10–16 Apr	SONAR	4,541	**38.2**	7.1	–	–	**45.3**	24.2	13.4	37.6	10.1	–	10.1	–	4.1	2.9	14.0
10–16 Apr	MAK	5,750	**35.8**	7.2	1.2	1.4	**45.6**	29.1	11.7	40.8	9.5	1.4	10.9	0.8	1.2	0.7	6.7
5–15 Apr	HBS	5,100	**35.5**	7.5	–	–	**43.0**	27.5	12.9	40.4	10.9	–	10.9	–	2.2	3.5	8.0
12–14 Apr	Areda Survey	10,136	**40.4**	8.8	0.3	1.6	**51.1**	25.5	7.6	33.1	10.3	0.9	11.2	1.0	3.1	0.5	14.9
9–14 Apr	TAG	2,100	29.7	6.4	–	–	36.1	**30.8**	15.8	**46.6**	9.8	1.2	11.0	1.1	2.4	2.8	1.1
8–12 Apr	ALF	2,340	**33.1**	6.6	–	–	39.7	30.2	13.2	**43.4**	10.1	–	10.1	–	4.3	2.5	2.9
Apr	AR-G / Anketler ve Raporlar	1,984	**31.1**	6.7	–	2.2	40.0	29.8	13.6	**43.4**	10.7	1.8	12.5	0.9	2.1	1.1	1.3
7–11 Apr	ORC	5,400	**31.6**	6.2	1.6	–	39.4	28.5	14.3	**42.8**	8.8	2.0	10.8	1.4	4.1	1.5	3.1
6-10 Apr	Avrasya / 23 DERECE	2,410	**34.4**	6.8	–	–	41.2	33.3	9.2	**42.5**	9.5	–	9.5	–	3.6	3.2	1.1
10 April 2023			Independent Turkey Party withdraws from the election supporting Nation Alliance.														
9 April 2023			Party for Change in Turkey decides to run on the lists of the Republican People's Party.														
7 April 2023			Democratic Left Party decides to run on the lists of the Justice and Development Party.														
1–7 Apr	Optimar	4,745	**38.0**	6.6	–	–	**44.6**	28.2	6.8	35.0	9.2	1.9	11.1	–	3.8	5.5	9.8
6 April 2023			Felicity Party, Democracy and Progress Party, Future Party, and the Democrat Party decide to run on the lists of the Republican People's Party.														

Fieldwork date	Polling firm / Published by	Sample size	PEOPLE					NATION							L&FA			ATA	No Alliances			Others	Lead
Fieldwork date	Polling firm / Published by	Sample size					Total (Note: Votes of YRP have been included to the total votes of the People's Alliance starting from 24th of March 2023.)							Total			Total					Others	Lead
Fieldwork date	Polling firm / Published by	Sample size	AKP	MHP	BBP	YRP	Total	CHP	İYİ	SP	DEVA	GP	DP	Total	HDP	TİP	Total	ZP	MP	TDP	BTP	Others	Lead
Apr	İEA / Tamga Turk	2,000	**35.8**	7.2	–	0.6	**43.6**	29.3	9.4	0.6	0.4	–	–	39.7	8.5	1.3	9.8	0.7	5.3	–	–	0.9	6.5
Apr	SAROS / Burhan Merhan Eptemli	10,729 (Note: https://twitter.com/BurhanEptemli/status/1644855958932267010)	**37.8**	6.3	0.4	0.3	**44.8**	26.4	8.5	0.6	1.4	0.1	0.3	37.3	11.8	0.7	12.5	0.4	2.5	–	–	2.3	11.4
1–3 Apr	MetroPOLL	2,610	**40.1**	5.1	–	0.7	**45.9**	24.6	9.6	0.6	0.8	0.5	–	36.1	12.8	1.1	13.9	0.7	2.7	–	–	0.7	15.5
25 Mar–2 Apr	ASAL	2,147	**38.8**	7.4	–	–	**46.2**	23.2	8.9	–	–	–	–	32.1	10.3	–	10.3	–	4.2	–	–	7.2	15.6
28 Mar–1 Apr	Areda Survey / Kamubiz	18,478	**40.0**	8.1	0.3	1.9	**50.5**	23.7	7.5	0.4	0.5	0.4	–	32.5	10.6	0.8	11.4	1.3	3.6	–	–	0.2 (Note: Free Cause Party – 0.2)	16.3
25–30 Mar	TAG	1,900	**31.6**	4.3	–	–	35.9	27.8	15.6	–	3.2	1.4	–	**48.0**	9.7	–	9.7	0.9	1.3	–	–	4.2	3.8
27–29 Mar	Yöneylem	2,655	**35.0**	6.3	–	1.1	**42.4**	27.6	9.5	–	0.9	–	–	38.0	9.3	3.3	12.6	1.0	4.5	–	–	1.5	7.4
24 March 2023			Free Cause Party decides to run on the lists of the Justice and Development Party.																				
24 March 2023			Peoples' Democratic Party, Labourist Movement Party and Social Freedom Party decide to run on the lists of Green Left Party.																				
24 March 2023			New Welfare Party joins the People's Alliance for the 2023 Turkish general election.																				
13–21 Mar	Artıbir / Kamuoyu Analizi	1,500	**31.1**	5.7	–	1.3	36.8	27.9	12.2	1.0	2.6	1.2	–	**44.9**	11.6	1.0	12.6	0.3	3.2	–	0.9	0.0	3.2
18–20 Mar	Yöneylem	2,400	**35.1**	6.9	–	1.6	**42.0**	28.1	9.3	–	0.5	–	–	37.9	9.8	3.3	13.1	0.9	3.6	–	–	1.0	7.0
Mar	SAROS	10,826	**36.7**	6.1	–	0.8	**42.8**	26.5	10.5	0.6	1.3	0.5	–	39.4	12.3	0.3	12.6	–	3.0	–	–	1.4	10.2
Mar	Themis / Haber 3	1,459	27.5	3.6	0.2	2.2	31.3	**30.8**	9.7	1.1	2.4	1.1	–	**45.1**	9.7	3.1	12.8	8.5	2.3	1.1	–	0.2 (Note: Patriotic Party – 0.2)	3.3
Mar	GENAR	–	**40.7**	7.6	–	1.4	**48.3**	23.1	7.0	–	–	–	–	30.1	10.8	1.9	12.7	–	4.7	–	–	2.8	17.6
13–18 Mar	Optimar / Hilmi Daşdemir	1,916	**38.4**	7.7	0.9	1.0	**47.0**	25.9	7.8	0.3	0.3	0.3	–	34.6	9.5	0.7	10.2	0.3	6.2	–	–	0.4 (Note: Patriotic Party – 0.1, Free Cause Party – 0.1)	12.5
12–17 Mar	Avrasya	2,560	29.1	7.0	–	1.5	36.1	**31.9**	10.5	0.9	2.1	0.8	0.5	**46.7**	10.2	1.6	11.8	1.0	1.6	–	–	1.3	2.8
11–15 Mar	Bulgu	1,800	**32.7**	7.1	0.1	0.7	39.9	26.8	12.5	0.9	0.9	0.2	–	**41.3**	10.2	1.6	11.9	–	5.5	–	0.2	0.2 (Note: Patriotic Party – 0.1, Labour Party (Labour and Freedom) – 0.1)	5.9
11–15 Mar	ORC	4,540	28.1	6.3	–	1.2	34.4	**28.3**	11.7	–	2.0	2.5	–	**44.5**	9.3	1.5	10.8	1.5	2.3	1.3	1.0	1.4	0.2
8–15 Mar	MAK	5,750 (Note: https://twitter.com/DanismanlikMak/status/1638501745738362882)	**34.2**	6.3	0.4	1.3	40.9	26.0	13.6	0.9	2.1	1.0	0.4	**44.0**	9.3	–	9.3	1.0	1.0	0.1	1.2	1.2 (Note: Free Cause Party – 0.8)	8.2
7–15 Mar	Pusula	7,410	**29.3**	6.1	–	1.5	35.4	24.9	11.4	1.1	2.2	0.8	–	**40.4**	10.5	0.8	11.3	1.7	7.8	–	0.9	1.0 (Note: Young Party – 0.2)	4.4
Mar	AR-G / T24	1,472	**31.4**	6.6	–	–	38.3	27.6	12.9	1.3	1.6	0.9	0.4	**44.7**	12.1	–	12.1	1.1	1.3	–	–	2.8	3.8
10–13 Mar	EuroPoll / Sözcü	2,544	29.8	7.6	–	–	37.4	**31.9**	8.8	–	2.6	3.4	–	**45.7**	11.3	–	11.3	–	–	–	1.9	3.0	2.1
11 March 2023			Ancestral Alliance is formed.																				
11 March 2023			Free Cause Party announces it would support the People's Alliance for the 2023 Turkish presidential election.																				
7–10 Mar	ADA	3,121	**40.2**	7.1	0.4	2.0	**47.7**	24.2	7.2	0.4	0.6	–	–	32.4	9.6	1.9	11.5	0.8	4.6	–	–	1.0	16.0
6–9 Mar	İEA	2,000	**35.4**	5.9	–	1.3	**41.3**	27.4	10.3	0.3	0.7	–	–	38.7	10.2	1.5	11.7	–	5.6	–	–	0.4	8.0
8 Mar	Aksoy	1,537	**31.0**	7.2	–	–	38.2	28.4	12.0	1.4	1.4	0.9	–	**44.1**	10.3	1.1	11.4	–	–	–	–	6.3	2.6
Mar	Piar	1,460	30.8	7.1	–	–	37.9	**32.3**	8.3	–	2.1	3.7	–	**46.4**	11.6	–	11.6	–	–	–	1.8	2.3	1.5
6–7 Mar	ALF	1,770	31.0	6.5	–	1.9	37.5	**31.8**	8.9	–	1.5	1.3	–	**43.5**	11.3	–	11.3	1.6	2.2	–	–	2.0	0.8
6 March 2023			Nation Alliance announces Kemal Kılıçdaroğlu as its joint presidential candidate.																				
6 March 2023			Good Party returns to the Nation Alliance																				
3 March 2023			Good Party withdraws from the Nation Alliance																				
23–27 Feb	Areda Survey / Yeni Şafak	3,000	**38.5**	10.1	0.2	1.4	**48.8**	22.8	10.4	0.6	0.9	0.4	0.3	35.4	10.5	0.4	10.9	1.6	1.1	0.1	–	0.7 (Note: Free Cause Party – 0.2, Patriotic Party – 0.2)	15.7
22–27 Feb	ORC / T24	4,720	**29.1**	5.4	1.5	1.0	36.0	23.5	19.5	–	2.3	2.5	–	**47.8**	8.1	–	8.1	2.0	1.3	1.8	–	2.0	5.6
23–26 Feb	Aksoy	1,537	**32.1**	6.8	–	–	38.9	27.3	13.6	0.8	0.9	0.7	–	**43.3**	12.0	–	12.0	–	–	–	–	5.8	4.8
21–25 Feb	ALF	2,000	**29.5**	5.6	–	1.6	35.1	27.8	15.7	–	1.8	1.5	–	**46.8**	9.8	–	9.8	2.5	2.2	–	–	2.0	1.7
19–23 Feb	Optimar / Hadi Özışık	2,000	**40.0**	7.1	0.5	1.2	**47.6**	25.7	10.1	1.2	0.8	0.4	–	38.2	9.6	–	9.6	0.5	1.7	–	–	0.1	14.3
18–20 Feb	TEAM / Gazete Duvar	1,930	**37.5**	6.6	–	–	**44.1**	24.5	11.6	–	–	–	–	36.1	11.1	–	11.1	–	–	–	–	8.7	13.0
16–20 Feb	İEA / Gazete Duvar	2,000	**33.7**	6.8	–	1.3	40.5	25.8	13.9	–	1.3	0.7	–	**41.7**	11.2	1.4	12.6	1.9	1.5	–	–	0.5	7.9
6 February 2023			An earthquake with a magnitude of M_{ww} 7.8 strikes Southern & Central Turkey.																				
27 Jan–2 Feb	Avrasya	2,460	**32.1**	5.1	–	1.2	37.2	31.5	12.8	–	3.5	–	–	**47.8**	9.9	–	9.9	1.4	–	–	–	2.5	0.6
Jan	Aksoy	1,537	**33.3**	7.7	–	–	41.0	25.5	14.6	1.1	1.2	0.2	–	**42.6**	11.1	–	11.1	–	–	–	–	5.2	7.8
23–26 Jan	ORC	4,580	**30.2**	5.5	1.6	–	37.3	23.1	19.3	–	2.6	2.7	–	**47.7**	7.6	–	7.6	1.8	–	2.3	1.4	1.9	7.1
18–24 Jan	ALF	2,000	**31.0**	6.1	–	–	37.1	26.1	15.8	–	2.4	2.7	–	**47.0**	8.6	–	8.6	1.8	1.4	2.2	–	1.9	4.9
14–24 Jan	ASAL	2,520	**39.2**	7.5	–	–	**46.7**	23.8	12.3	–	–	–	–	36.1	10.1	–	10.1	–	–	–	–	7.1	15.4
13–18 Jan	ANAPOLLIA	1,002	**30.6**	5.3	–	1.0	35.9	23.8	21.7	1.2	2.6	1.7	0.3	**51.3**	8.5	–	8.5	2.7	0.5	–	–	–	6.8
13–16 Jan	ORC / Halk TV	3,920	**31.5**	6.5	–	–	38.0	25.5	19.3	–	2.3	2.8	–	**49.9**	8.0	–	8.0	1.4	–	–	–	2.7	6.0
11–14 Jan	TEAM	2,524	**37.5**	6.5	–	–	**44.0**	26.0	11.7	–	–	–	–	37.7	11.1	–	11.1	–	–	–	–	7.3	11.5
6–13 Jan	Areda Survey / Yeni Şafak	4,900	**40.8**	10.3	0.3	1.3	**51.4**	22.6	9.9	0.8	0.8	0.1	0.1	34.3	10.2	0.4	10.6	0.8	0.6	–	–	0.9 (Note: Free Cause Party – 0.2, Patriotic Party – 0.2)	18.2
7–9 Jan	Piar / Gazete Karınca	2,611	**31.2**	6.3	–	–	37.5	25.1	14.3	–	1.1	3.8	–	**44.3**	11.2	–	11.2	1.6	–	–	1.9	3.5	6.1
3–8 Jan	Avrasya	2,612	29.5	5.6	–	1.2	35.1	**31.1**	13.8	–	3.5	–	–	**48.4**	11.2	–	11.2	1.7	–	–	–	2.4	1.6
1–7 Jan	MAK / Fatih Portakal TV	5,750	**34.3**	6.3	0.4	1.3	41.0	25.0	15.6	0.9	2.5	1.2	0.4	**45.6**	8.4	–	8.4	1.0	0.2	0.1	1.2	1.2 (Note: Free Cause Party – 0.8)	9.3
2–5 Jan	ORC	3,780	**32.0**	6.2	–	–	38.2	23.5	19.1	–	2.5	2.9	–	**48.0**	7.3	–	7.3	–	–	2.2	1.8	2.5	8.5
23 Dec–2 Jan	Sosyo Politik	1,582	**33.2**	6.5	–	–	39.7	28.5	13.3	0.8	2.9	0.7	–	**46.2**	13.1	0.6	13.7	0.4	–	–	–	0.1 (Note: Free Cause Party – 0.1)	4.7
27 Dec–1 Jan	Optimar / Hürriyet	2,001	**41.1**	7.4	0.8	0.7	**49.3**	23.6	8.1	1.0	1.1	0.9	–	34.7	9.8	–	9.8	2.3	1.2	0.5	–	1.5 (Note: Patriotic Party – 0.4)	17.5
2018 parliamentary election		51,183,729	42.6	11.1	N/A		53.7	22.6	10.0	1.3	N/A			33.9	11.7	N/A						0.7 (Note: Free Cause Party – 0.3, Patriotic Party – 0.2, independent – 0.2)	20.0

=== 2022 ===
Fieldwork date	Polling firm / Published by	Sample size																	Others	Lead
Fieldwork date	Polling firm / Published by	Sample size	AKP	CHP	HDP	MHP	İYİ	SP	DEVA	GP	BBP	YRP	MP	TDP	DP	TİP	ZP	BTP	Others	Lead
Dec	SAROS / Anketler ve Raporlar	11,106	**35.1**	26.0	11.0	6.2	11.9	0.5	2.7	1.1	0.5	0.9	0.3	–	–	0.3	1.2	–	2.1 (Note: Patriotic Party – 0.5)	9.1
Dec	HBS	55,000	**30.9**	25.2	10.4	6.3	20.8	–	–	–	–	–	–	–	–	–	–	–	6.5	5.7
25–28 Dec	TÜSİAR	3,453	**37.21**	23.52	9.90	7.91	11.15	1.22	1.39	1.74	0.52	1.97	0.61	0.49	–	0.49	1.10	0.49	0.29	13.69
22–27 Dec	Yöneylem / Halk TV	2,400	**32.1**	25.5	9.7	8.1	13.5	0.6	1.5	–	–	1.9	1.0	–	–	2.0	2.7	–	1.4	6.6
Dec	TEAM	5,521	**35.2**	26.9	10.2	7.9	12.6	–	–	–	–	–	–	–	–	–	–	–	7.2	8.3
20–25 Dec	AREA	2,004	**32.7**	26.4	10.0	7.0	14.0	0.5	3.1	0.5	–	1.4	–	–	–	–	2.7	–	1.7	6.3
20–25 Dec	ALF	2,750	**30.5**	27.3	9.1	7.1	14.4	–	2.3	3.0	–	1.0	–	2.1	–	–	2.0	–	1.2	3.2
14–24 Dec	Artıbir / T24	1,500	**30.6**	28.1	11.9	6.1	14.3	1.1	4.6	1.2	–	0.2	0.2	–	–	–	0.7	1.0	0.0	2.5
19–22 Dec	ORC	4,220	**31.2**	24.2	7.5	7.1	17.5	–	2.3	2.4	–	1.2	–	2.0	–	–	1.7	1.4	1.5	7.0
15–18 Dec	Piar	2,618	**29.8**	26.7	9.8	9.1	10.3	–	2.3	3.8	–	–	–	–	–	–	3.0	2.0	3.2	3.1
13–18 Dec	MetroPOLL	2,077	**36.9**	24.7	11.2	7.3	12.5	–	–	–	–	1.3	–	–	–	–	2.0	–	4.2	12.2
10–18 Dec	ASAL	2,142	**36.2**	24.2	11.3	8.5	12.5	1.1	0.8	0.5	–	1.3	–	–	–	–	–	–	3.6	12.0
8–18 Dec	Themis / Yeni Çağ Gazetesi	4,779	**31.2**	28.3	7.9	6.6	12.6	–	1.4	–	–	–	1.9	–	–	–	8.2	–	1.9	2.9
5–14 Dec	Optimar / Hürriyet	2,502	**39.2**	23.9	10.7	8.6	10.9	0.9	0.9	0.9	–	1.0	–	–	–	–	0.5	–	2.5	15.3
3 Nov–12 Dec	Global Akademi & Akademetre / Gazete Duvar	1,000	**39.0**	27.1	10.5	9.8	11.3	0.9	0.2	0.2	0.2	–	0.1	0.1	0.2	–	–	0.1	0.4 (Note: Communist Party of Turkey – 0.3, Patriotic Party – 0.1)	11.9
3–6 Dec	ORC	3,670	**30.8**	24.0	7.3	7.0	17.1	–	2.3	2.8	–	1.6	1.0	2.1	–	–	1.5	1.3	1.2	6.8
29 Nov–3 Dec	Avrasya	2,612	29.2	**31.5**	11.7	5.8	13.2	–	3.4	–	–	1.5	–	–	–	–	2.0	–	1.7	2.3
Nov	SAROS / Haberdar	11,028	**33.1**	25.9	11.0	6.3	11.5	0.8	3.3	1.0	0.1	1.2	0.6	–	–	0.3	1.8	0.6	2.5 (Note: Free Cause Party – 0.7, Patriotic Party – 0.5, Communist Party of Turkey – 0.1)	7.2
Nov	BETİMAR / Milliyet	–	**38.3**	22.2	9.2	8.5	12.5	1.3	0.9	0.3	–	2.0	1.0	–	–	0.7	1.9	–	1.2	16.1
25–30 Nov	Areda Survey / Haber 7	2,000	**39.4**	23.7	10.7	9.6	11.3	0.6	0.8	0.1	0.3	1.2	0.6	–	0.2	0.3	1.0	–	0.2 (Note: Free Cause Party – 0.1, Patriotic Party – 0.1)	15.7
21–30 Nov	Artıbir / T24	1,500	**30.4**	27.9	11.8	5.4	14.7	1.2	4.8	1.3	–	0.3	0.3	–	–	–	0.8	1.1	3.7	2.5
24–29 Nov	Aksoy / Gazete Duvar	1,537	**32.9**	28.7	11.0	7.8	13.9	0.6	0.7	0.7	–	–	–	–	–	–	–	–	3.7	4.2
23–27 Nov	Yöneylem / Halk TV	2,400	**32.8**	26.3	10.1	7.2	13.9	0.8	1.6	–	–	1.7	0.7	–	–	1.4	2.3	–	1.1	6.5
20–25 Nov	AREA	2,005	**34.4**	25.8	11.6	7.0	14.6	1.0	3.0	1.0	–	–	–	–	–	–	1.0	–	0.7	8.6
15–24 Nov	ASAL	2,500	**37.7**	24.4	10.4	8.7	11.2	0.8	1.2	0.8	0.6	1.4	0.6	–	–	–	1.0	–	1.2	13.3
18–23 Nov	ORC	4,280	**31.1**	24.2	7.4	6.8	17.8	–	2.3	2.7	1.3	1.5	–	2.0	–	–	–	1.5	1.4	6.9
15–20 Nov	MetroPOLL	2,122	**36.5**	24.7	12.7	8.2	11.2	1.2	–	–	–	1.2	–	–	–	–	–	–	4.3	11.8
14–17 Nov	ALF	2,150	**29.4**	28.1	8.3	6.7	13.3	–	2.4	2.2	–	1.0	1.2	2.1	–	–	2.5	1.5	1.3	1.3
1–8 Nov	MAK / İnternet Haber	5,750	**33.5**	25.3	7.8	6.8	16.2	0.6	2.5	1.3	0.4	1.3	0.2	0.1	0.4	–	1.2	1.2	1.2 (Note: Free Cause Party – 0.8)	8.2
29 Oct–6 Nov	Avrasya	2,560	30.0	**30.6**	11.3	6.8	13.3	–	3.4	–	–	1.2	–	–	–	–	1.8	–	1.6	0.6
1–4 Nov	ORC	3,420	**30.4**	24.0	7.2	6.5	17.6	–	2.5	2.6	1.4	1.1	1.2	2.1	–	–	–	1.9	1.5	6.4
Oct	Aksoy	1,537	**31.7**	28.1	11.2	7.8	13.3	1.3	1.4	0.3	–	–	–	–	–	–	–	–	4.9	3.6
24–28 Oct	Yöneylem / Medyascope	2,400	**32.4**	29.1	10.1	5.8	12.4	0.8	1.6	0.4	–	2.0	0.6	–	–	1.3	2.4	–	1.1	3.3
19–26 Oct	ADA	3,029	**40.2**	22.6	10.7	8.6	10.4	0.4	1.1	–	–	2.4	0.8	–	–	–	1.3	–	1.5	17.6
19–26 Oct	AREA	2,376	**33.2**	24.8	10.3	8.7	16.0	1.0	2.1	1.0	–	1.0	–	–	–	–	1.4	–	0.5	8.4
20–24 Oct	ALF	4,100	28.2	**28.4**	9.1	6.2	14.5	–	2.0	2.1	–	1.0	1.7	1.8	–	–	2.3	1.7	1.0	0.2
15–18 Oct	MetroPOLL	2,145	**36.3**	23.2	11.9	10.0	12.4	1.3	1.4	–	–	–	–	–	–	–	0.7	–	2.8	13.1
10–18 Oct	Artıbir / Gazete Duvar	1,500	**30.2**	27.9	10.8	6.9	14.8	1.2	4.2	1.7	–	0.6	0.5	–	–	–	1.2	–	0.0	2.3
Oct	Themis / Muhbir	–	28.6	**31.3**	9.7	5.4	11.9	–	1.8	–	–	1.6	–	–	–	–	7.6	–	2.1	2.7
5–15 Oct	MAK / Fatih Portakal TV	5,750	**32.7**	26.0	7.7	7.2	15.8	0.9	2.1	1.3	0.4	1.1	0.2	0.2	0.5	–	1.6	1.2	1.1 (Note: Free Cause Party – 0.9)	6.7
5–14 Oct	ASAL	2,312	**38.4**	23.5	10.7	9.1	11.0	0.9	1.4	0.9	0.8	1.1	0.7	–	–	–	1.5	–	0.0	14.9
10–13 Oct	Piar	2,524	**28.6**	28.1	9.8	8.6	11.7	0.9	1.5	2.9	–	1.6	–	–	–	0.9	2.7	1.9	0.8	0.5
7–10 Oct	ORC	3,680	**30.2**	24.5	7.3	6.3	18.7	–	2.4	3.5	1.7	–	–	1.5	–	–	–	1.8	2.1	5.7
1–3 Oct	TÜSİAR	5,542	**36.30**	24.09	10.10	7.09	11.13	1.14	2.17	1.70	–	1.89	0.99	–	–	0.87	1.17	–	1.35	12.21
1–3 Oct	ALF	2,560	28.6	**29.1**	8.3	6.0	14.1	1.0	2.2	2.0	–	–	1.4	1.9	–	–	2.5	1.8	1.1	0.5
Sep	SAROS	2,025	**32.4**	26.2	13.1	7.4	12.5	0.7	3.0	0.8	–	1.0	0.5	–	–	–	1.9	–	0.5	6.2
Sep	AR-G	–	**29.8**	25.9	10.5	6.9	14.1	1.3	1.8	0.6	–	1.8	0.5	–	–	1.0	3.2	–	2.6	3.9
26–29 Sep	Areda Survey / Hürriyet	2,000	**38.0**	25.0	10.5	10.1	10.2	0.8	1.2	–	–	1.5	–	–	–	–	1.3	–	–	13.0
23–28 Sep	Yöneylem / Gazete Duvar	2,400	**31.1**	28.4	9.2	7.1	13.5	0.6	2.4	0.3	–	1.8	0.7	–	–	1.1	2.1	–	–	2.7
22–26 Sep	Optimar	2,231	**37.8**	25.9	11.0	9.5	9.8	0.6	1.0	0.5	0.6	1.2	0.5	0.6	–	–	1.0	–	0.0	11.9
17–21 Sep	ORC	6,190	**30.6**	24.8	7.1	6.0	19.4	–	2.0	2.6	1.8	–	–	1.8	–	–	–	1.7	2.2	5.8
17–20 Sep	MetroPOLL	2,119	**33.6**	24.8	13.9	9.1	12.2	0.8	1.4	–	–	1.4	–	–	–	–	1.0	–	1.7	8.8
15–20 Sep	AREA	3,123	**30.0**	27.1	10.7	8.7	15.0	1.0	3.1	0.7	–	1.1	–	–	0.5	–	1.5	–	0.6	2.9
13–19 Sep	EDAR / Sabah	1,970	**37.8**	22.4	10.6	7.2	11.2	–	2.7	–	–	1.6	–	–	–	–	3.6	–	2.9	15.4
15–18 Sep	Piar	2,608	**29.1**	28.1	10.6	8.6	11.2	0.9	1.9	1.1	–	1.4	–	–	–	0.8	3.5	1.8	1.0	1.0
10–18 Sep	Aksoy	1,067	**29.7**	29.1	10.1	7.6	14.1	1.1	2.1	1.0	–	–	–	–	–	–	–	–	5.1	0.6
5–14 Sep	Artıbir / Haberimiz Var	1,500	28.6	**28.7**	12.3	5.8	15.1	1.4	4.7	1.9	–	0.4	0.3	–	–	–	0.8	–	0.0	0.1
7–9 Sep	ALF	3,920	27.2	**28.0**	8.0	6.2	16.9	1.1	2.5	1.3	–	–	1.4	2.0	–	–	2.3	1.7	1.4	0.8
1–7 Sep	Orthus	1,519	**32.3**	24.4	9.8	6.0	15.8	1.3	4.1	1.1	–	0.9	–	–	–	–	1.5	–	2.8	7.9
25 Aug–1 Sep	Yöneylem	2,403	29.5	**29.7**	9.4	6.4	13.5	0.8	1.7	0.3	–	2.0	–	–	–	1.6	3.4	–	1.7	0.2
Aug	ADA	5,002	**37.3**	24.5	10.2	7.7	10.3	1.2	1.6	0.8	–	1.2	1.1	–	–	–	2.0	–	2.1	12.8
Aug	Bulgu	1,800	**31.6**	30.0	10.3	6.1	13.1	0.9	2.0	0.5	–	2.2	0.8	–	–	–	2.2	–	0.3	1.6
24–30 Aug	AREA	2,000	**30.6**	28.2	10.1	7.5	14.6	–	3.5	–	–	–	–	–	–	–	–	–	5.5	2.4
Aug	Aksoy / Cumhuriyet	1,067	**29.8**	29.0	10.0	7.6	13.7	–	–	–	–	–	–	–	–	–	–	–	10.0	0.8
22–28 Aug	Avrasya	2,000	30.1	**32.1**	8.0	7.0	12.1	0.8	4.1	0.4	–	1.5	0.4	–	–	–	3.1	–	0.4	2.0
25–27 Aug	ALF	4,400	27.0	**28.3**	8.2	6.7	18.7	1.0	2.3	1.1	–	–	1.2	2.1	–	–	1.7	–	1.7	1.3
23–27 Aug	Areda Survey / Haber 7	2,000	**36.6**	24.4	11.1	10.4	11.0	0.8	1.3	–	0.2	1.6	0.4	–	–	–	1.4	–	0.7 (Note: Free Cause Party – 0.1)	12.2
Aug	AR-G	–	**28.9**	26.3	9.7	6.8	16.6	1.4	1.9	0.9	–	1.0	0.5	–	0.6	–	1.9	0.7	2.8	2.6
25 August 2022			HDP, TİP, EMEP, EHP and TÖP form Labour and Freedom Alliance																	
18–22 Aug	ORC	5,310	**27.3**	25.1	7.2	6.1	21.1	1.4	2.1	2.2	1.8	–	–	1.9	–	–	–	1.8	2.0	2.2
13–17 Aug	MetroPOLL	1,717	**33.3**	23.2	13.4	7.1	13.7	1.3	3.1	–	–	1.0	–	–	–	–	2.6	–	1.3	10.1
12–15 Aug	Optimar / Hürriyet	2,000	**37.2**	26.0	9.9	9.5	10.0	0.7	1.0	0.6	–	1.5	–	–	–	–	1.5	–	2.1	10.2
9–15 Aug	ASAL	2,500	**35.5**	25.7	10.1	8.9	11.6	0.9	1.6	0.8	0.8	1.1	0.8	0.9	–	–	1.3	–	0.0	9.8
Aug	ALF	7,450	27.7	**28.1**	8.7	7.1	19.0	0.9	2.1	1.4	–	0.8	1.1	–	–	–	1.6	–	1.5	0.4
30 Jul–8 Aug	Avrasya	2,410	28.5	**29.9**	10.5	7.1	13.3	1.2	5.1	1.2	–	–	–	–	–	–	1.3	–	1.9	1.4
1–5 Aug	Piar	2,604	28.1	**28.5**	11.2	7.8	12.9	–	3.0	3.5	–	–	–	–	–	–	–	1.8	3.2	0.4
28 Jul–1 Aug	Yöneylem	2,400	**29.5**	29.4	9.0	6.0	14.9	0.6	2.3	0.6	–	2.3	–	–	–	1.0	2.5	–	1.9	0.1
Jul	Aksoy	–	**29.7**	28.8	10.0	7.8	14.0	0.9	2.5	1.3	–	–	–	–	–	–	–	–	5.2	0.9
26–30 Jul	Areda Survey / Hürriyet	2,000	**35.6**	24.3	10.6	10.3	13.5	–	–	–	–	–	–	–	–	–	–	–	5.7	11.3
23–27 Jul	AREA / Tele1	2,000	**30.3**	27.1	10.8	7.6	15.1	–	3.0	–	–	–	–	–	–	–	–	–	6.0	3.2
Jul	SAROS	–	**32.5**	25.9	12.8	7.7	14.1	0.7	2.1	0.6	–	1.3	0.5	–	–	–	0.9	–	0.8	6.6
11–16 Jul	MetroPOLL	2,091	**33.8**	24.9	11.4	6.0	14.5	1.6	2.8	–	–	1.2	–	–	–	–	1.9	–	1.9	8.9
11–14 Jul	Optimar / Hürriyet	3,481	**36.7**	26.3	10.1	9.5	11.1	–	–	–	–	–	–	–	–	–	–	–	6.3	10.4
1–9 Jul	Themis / Haber 3	2,967	**35.3**	25.4	10.3	4.1	13.1	0.5	0.9	0.5	0.9	–	1.6	–	–	–	7.2	–	0.0	9.9
3–8 Jul	ASAL	2,425	**34.0**	26.0	10.8	8.9	11.9	0.8	1.8	0.8	–	1.2	–	–	–	–	1.3	–	2.5	8.0
Jul	ALF	3,400	**28.4**	27.2	8.5	6.6	16.4	1.7	2.3	2.0	–	0.9	–	1.9	–	–	1.3	1.6	1.2	1.2
1–4 Jul	ORC	9,330	**27.1**	24.0	7.6	7.0	22.1	1.3	2.2	2.0	–	1.7	–	1.8	–	–	–	1.7	1.5	3.1
1–2 Jul	Piar	11,406	27.8	**29.6**	11.2	7.3	11.0	–	3.8	3.0	–	–	–	–	–	–	–	2.3	4.0	1.8
25 Jun–1 Jul	AKAM	1,460	28.4	**29.9**	10.7	6.1	13.4	1.5	5.3	1.2	–	–	–	–	0.5	–	1.3	–	1.7	1.5
26–30 Jun	Areda Survey / Star	2,000	**36.3**	24.2	10.6	10.2	12.5	0.4	0.9	0.1	0.1	1.0	0.3	0.1	–	–	2.8	–	0.4	12.1
Jun	Artıbir	1,500	**29.1**	28.2	12.4	5.9	14.9	1.6	4.6	2.1	–	0.4	0.3	–	–	–	0.5	–	–	0.9
24–28 Jun	Yöneylem	2,704	27.1	**27.7**	10.4	8.2	16.0	0.9	2.0	0.4	–	2.1	–	–	–	1.0	2.8	–	1.4	0.6
23–28 Jun	Optimar / Hürriyet	1,613	**36.0**	26.0	10.0	10.0	10.3	0.8	1.6	0.4	0.6	0.9	0.6	1.0	–	–	1.9	–	–	10.0
13–24 Jun	SONAR	3,100	**32.3**	23.1	7.5	7.1	19.0	–	1.7	–	1.6	1.1	1.4	1.2	–	–	1.3	–	2.7 (Note: Democratic Left Party – 1.2)	9.2
10–21 Jun	Objektif / Avrasya Anket	9,960	29.1	**30.2**	9.6	6.1	14.2	1.6	3.6	1.7	–	–	–	–	–	–	1.6	–	2.3	1.1
Jun	Polimetre / Gazete Duvar	–	**29.0**	23.8	11.6	8.6	11.4	1.6	6.9	4.0	–	–	–	–	–	–	–	–	2.4	5.2
12–15 Jun	Optimar / T24	2,519	**35.9**	26.2	10.1	10.4	10.7	0.8	1.1	0.4	0.8	0.9	0.5	0.9	–	–	1.1	–	0.2 (Note: Patriotic Party – 0.1)	9.7
11–15 Jun	MetroPOLL	2,123	**32.8**	23.6	12.5	5.3	16.6	1.7	1.6	0.8	–	0.7	0.7	–	–	–	2.2	–	1.2	9.2
7–14 Jun	ASAL / Europe Elects	3,000	**32.5**	26.5	11.0	8.1	12.8	1.1	2.3	1.2	–	1.4	–	–	–	–	–	–	3.1	6.0
1–12 Jun	Sosyo Politik	1,563	**30.0**	28.7	13.8	4.8	15.7	1.4	4.5	1.1	–	–	–	–	–	–	–	–	0.0	1.3
5–8 Jun	ALF	4,100	**27.2**	25.1	8.3	6.8	19.4	1.7	2.4	2.0	–	1.3	–	–	–	–	–	1.6	2.4	2.1
Jun	Aksoy / Muhbir	1,067	**29.4**	28.9	10.2	8.0	13.7	1.3	2.6	0.6	–	–	–	–	–	–	–	–	5.4	0.5
Jun	AR-G	–	**29.7**	26.1	9.8	7.0	17.2	1.2	2.1	1.1	–	1.1	–	–	0.5	0.9	1.5	–	1.8	3.6
3–7 Jun	Piar	2,610	**30.4**	24.8	11.2	7.8	15.5	–	3.1	–	–	–	–	–	–	–	2.4	1.4	3.4	5.6
1–5 Jun	ORC	4,620	**27.7**	23.8	7.5	7.1	20.6	1.7	1.9	2.1	1.5	0.8	1.1	1.7	–	–	–	1.6	0.9	3.9
2–4 Jun	Yöneylem / Gazete Duvar	2,700	**29.8**	29.5	10.3	6.9	13.2	1.0	2.3	0.2	–	2.3	–	–	–	0.8	1.8	–	1.9	0.3
26 May–1 Jun	Avrasya	1,500	29.5	**30.7**	9.2	5.4	13.0	1.1	4.8	1.8	–	1.1	–	–	–	–	1.6	–	1.8	1.2
15–31 May	MOTTO & Bulgu / Europe Elects	1,800	**29.3**	27.9	10.0	6.8	15.3	0.1	2.0	0.6	0.2	1.9	–	–	0.3	–	4.1	–	1.5	1.4
25–30 May	Areda Survey / En Son Haber	2,000	**36.6**	24.0	10.2	10.1	12.8	0.6	1.0	0.2	0.1	0.8	0.8	–	0.2	–	2.3	–	0.4 (Note: Patriotic Party – 0.3)	12.6
28–29 May	Gezici	–	**35.4**	26.7	11.2	8.8	11.2	–	2.1	1.2	–	1.3	–	–	–	–	–	–	2.1	8.7
May	Aksoy	1,067	**30.1**	28.8	9.7	8.3	13.2	1.4	2.2	0.7	–	–	–	–	–	–	–	–	5.6	1.3
May	SAROS	2,987	**31.9**	26.8	12.8	7.7	12.2	0.7	2.8	1.4	–	1.4	–	–	–	–	–	–	2.3	5.1
23–27 May	AREA	2,282	**29.3**	28.0	11.1	8.0	16.3	1.0	3.4	1.0	–	–	–	–	–	–	1.2	–	0.7	1.3
20–27 May	KONDA / Medyascope	3,260	**28.7**	24.7	12.2	7.5	21.7	–	–	–	–	–	–	–	–	–	–	–	5.2	4.0
16–23 May	Artıbir	1,500	**29.4**	27.3	12.3	6.3	14.6	1.7	4.8	2.4	–	0.5	0.3	–	–	–	0.4	–	–	2.1
13–20 May	MetroPOLL	2,045	**32.7**	22.6	13.8	8.0	15.1	1.6	1.3	–	–	1.0	0.8	–	–	0.6	–	–	0.7	10.1
9–18 May	Remres	4,806	**30.0**	27.2	10.0	5.6	19.2	–	1.3	0.8	–	–	–	–	–	–	4.7	–	1.2	2.8
13–17 May	ALF	3,550	**28.5**	24.3	8.1	7.1	19.0	1.6	2.3	2.1	–	1.2	1.0	1.8	0.7	–	–	1.5	0.8	4.2
5–14 May	MAK	5,750	**28.3**	27.1	7.8	6.6	16.1	1.1	3.1	2.8	0.4	0.9	0.4	0.2	0.4	1.8	–	1.4	1.6 (Note: Free Cause Party – 0.9)	1.2
6–12 May	SONAR	2,840	**32.5**	24.4	8.6	7.2	15.0	–	2.0	1.8	1.3	1.6	1.5	–	–	–	–	–	4.1 (Note: Democratic Left Party – 1.4)	8.1
5–9 May	Piar / Kanalım Var Konuşu-Yorum	2,584	**34.3**	23.3	11.8	8.2	10.9	1.2	1.8	–	–	–	–	–	–	1.1	3.0	1.4	3.0	11.0
5–8 May	ASAL	2,400	**35.1**	25.8	10.4	9.0	12.3	1.0	1.8	0.7	–	–	–	–	–	–	–	–	3.9	9.3
5–8 May	ORC / Anketler ve Raporlar	5,300	**28.0**	24.1	8.7	7.2	18.4	1.6	2.0	2.1	1.0	1.4	1.1	1.6	0.6	–	–	1.3	0.9	3.9
May	Anapollia / Anketler ve Raporlar	1,816	**28.7**	27.3	10.9	6.6	18.5	1.0	2.7	1.9	–	1.0	0.5	–	1.0	–	0.8	–	–	1.4
May	Yöneylem / Anketler ve Raporlar	–	**31.2**	29.4	10.3	7.4	12.4	1.0	1.9	–	1.0	–	–	–	–	1.0	2.7	–	2.1	1.8
Apr	ALF	–	**29.2**	25.0	9.1	7.4	16.1	1.7	2.1	2.0	–	1.3	1.1	1.5	0.6	–	0.7	1.1	1.1	4.2
Apr	Avrasya / Anketler ve Raporlar	2,400	29.5	**30.5**	9.9	5.7	12.6	0.9	4.7	1.9	–	–	–	–	–	–	2.2	–	2.0	1.0
Apr	Optimar	1,847	**36.2**	26.6	10.2	10.1	10.6	0.8	1.1	0.6	0.5	0.6	0.6	0.7	–	–	0.5	–	0.9	9.6
Apr	MetroPOLL	–	**32.1**	22.4	12.3	7.3	18.6	1.4	2.0	0.6	–	1.3	–	–	–	–	0.6	–	1.4	3.2
21–30 Apr	Artıbir / Gazete Duvar	1,500	**29.7**	27.2	12.6	6.2	14.2	1.8	4.6	2.3	–	0.7	0.4	–	–	–	0.3	–	–	2.5
26–28 Apr	Areda Survey / Tamga Türk	2,000	**36.9**	25.1	9.4	10.1	11.8	1.0	0.9	0.2	0.3	1.3	0.7	0.4	–	–	1.1	–	0.8	11.8
20–25 Apr	AREA / Yeni Çağ Gazetesi	2,450	**30.0**	27.0	10.5	8.1	16.0	0.7	2.2	0.5	0.4	0.6	0.3	0.5	0.4	1.2	0.4	–	1.1	3.0
17–22 Apr	ORC / Anketler ve Raporlar	4,385	**28.1**	24.3	8.5	7.8	17.3	1.6	2.1	2.3	0.5	1.3	0.9	1.5	0.6	–	0.8	1.2	1.2 (Note: Free Cause Party – 0.5)	3.8
Apr	Aksoy / Anketler ve Raporlar	–	**30.4**	28.9	10.4	7.3	13.3	1.1	2.7	1.4	–	–	–	–	–	–	–	–	4.4	1.5
Apr	MAK / Anketler ve Raporlar	–	**29.3**	27.1	8.4	7.1	15.1	1.3	3.2	2.8	–	–	–	–	–	–	–	–	5.7	2.2
Apr	IEA / Anketler ve Raporlar	–	**32.3**	25.9	11.6	6.7	16.8	1.2	1.7	0.5	–	–	–	–	–	–	0.5	–	2.9	6.4
8–10 Apr	ASAL / Anketler ve Raporlar	–	**35.9**	25.1	10.9	9.1	11.8	1.3	1.9	1.0	–	1.4	–	–	–	–	–	–	2.0	10.8
Apr	Sosyo Politik / Anketler ve Raporlar	–	**33.4**	30.2	11.2	7.1	12.4	0.6	3.8	1.6	–	–	1.4	–	–	–	–	–	0.0	3.2
Apr	ANAPOLLIA / Anketler ve Raporlar	2,012	**29.5**	27.1	11.4	7.1	16.7	0.9	3.0	1.5	–	1.1	0.4	0.3	0.1	–	–	0.1	0.2 (Note: Free Cause Party – 0.2)	2.4
Apr	Artıbir / Anketler ve Raporlar	–	**29.5**	27.4	13.2	6.7	14.2	1.6	4.3	2.1	–	–	–	–	–	–	–	–	1.0	2.1
Apr	Sosyo Politik	–	**33.4**	30.2	11.2	7.1	12.4	0.6	3.8	1.4	–	–	–	–	–	–	–	–	–	3.2
1–4 Apr	PİAR	2,584	**34.0**	24.5	11.9	9.0	10.3	1.6	2.3	–	–	–	–	–	–	1.1	1.5	1.3	2.5	9.5
1–3 Apr	Yöneylem	–	**31.2**	28.6	10.0	7.8	14.5	0.7	2.6	0.5	–	1.8	–	–	–	1.3	–	–	1.0	2.6
31 Mar–3 Apr	ORC	3,540	**28.4**	23.2	9.1	8.2	17.0	1.5	2.7	3.2	–	1.2	1.0	1.4	0.8	–	–	0.6	1.7 (Note: Free Cause Party – 0.9)	5.2
31 March 2022			Electoral threshold was reduced from 10% to 7%.																	
Mar	MetroPoll	–	**34.3**	24.1	13.0	4.9	16.1	1.4	2.2	0.7	–	1.2	–	–	–	–	–	–	2.1	10.2
Mar	Areda Survey / En Son Haber	–	**38.1**	23.2	10.9	10.3	11.6	0.7	1.7	0.3	0.5	0.7	1.0	0.1	–	–	–	–	0.9	14.9
24–29 Mar	Avrasya	2,400	30.8	**31.5**	10.1	5.7	12.6	0.8	3.5	0.8	–	0.9	0.7	–	0.5	0.8	0.8	–	0.5	0.7
Mar	Bulgu / T24	–	**32.4**	26.2	10.6	7.4	12.8	0.7	1.8	0.5	–	1.5	–	–	–	1.2	–	–	4.9	6.2
21–23 Mar	AREA	2,500	**31.1**	27.3	10.3	8.3	16.0	1.0	3.1	1.0	–	–	–	–	0.5	–	–	–	1.4	3.8
Mar	İlgi / Anketler ve Raporlar	–	**30.9**	25.9	11.2	9.2	13.4	–	–	–	–	–	–	–	–	–	–	–	9.4	5.0
Mar	İEA	–	**31.9**	25.9	11.6	7.8	15.2	1.6	2.7	1.2	–	–	–	–	–	–	–	–	2.7	6.0
Mar	ORC / Diken	7,290	**28.1**	23.8	8.9	8.7	16.8	1.6	3.5	3.0	–	0.9	0.8	1.4	1.0	–	–	–	1.5	4.3
10–15 Mar	ALF / T24	3,200	**28.7**	24.2	8.4	8.1	16.1	1.6	3.6	4.1	–	0.9	–	1.5	0.7	–	–	1.0	1.1	4.5
Mar	Aksoy / Cumhuriyet	–	**29.8**	28.4	9.9	8.6	13.6	1.0	2.9	1.0	–	–	–	–	–	–	–	–	4.7	1.4
15–18 Mar	ASAL / Haberler.com	1,580	**34.5**	26.1	10.4	8.6	12.3	1.3	2.0	1.2	0.6	0.7	0.9	0.7	0.2	–	–	–	0.5 (Note: Patriotic Party – 0.1)	8.4
10–16 Mar	Optimar / Hürriyet	2,002	**38.7**	25.1	9.7	10.5	11.0	1.1	1.1	0.6	–	0.7	0.5	0.8	–	–	–	–	0.2	13.6
Mar	MAK / Cumhuriyet	5,750	**30.6**	26.4	8.8	7.2	14.8	1.3	3.4	2.8	0.3	0.7	0.3	0.1	0.3	–	–	1.2	1.6 (Note: Free Cause Party – 0.8)	4.2
Mar	AR-G / Anketler ve Raporlar	–	**30.1**	28.3	10.1	7.6	13.9	1.5	3.9	2.1	–	–	0.7	–	0.6	0.4	–	0.3	0.5	1.8
Mar	PİAR	–	**32.7**	25.7	11.8	9.3	11.2	1.5	2.9	1.4	–	–	–	–	–	0.9	–	0.9	1.7	7.0
03–06 Mar	Yöneylem	–	**32.0**	30.3	9.8	6.9	12.9	1.0	2.8	0.4	–	1.0	0.4	–	–	1.0	–	–	1.5	1.7
24 Feb–1 Mar	Avrasya	2,460	28.1	**28.4**	12.6	5.5	13.0	1.6	5.4	1.9	–	–	0.6	–	0.9	0.9	–	0.7	0.4	0.3
26–28 Feb	Gezici / gercekgundem.com	2,368	**30.4**	28.2	10.1	9.2	11.3	0.8	2.2	1.4	0.6	1.0	1.2	0.9	0.9	0.4	1.2	–	0.2 (Note: Patriotic Party – 0.1, Democratic Left Party – 0.1)	2.2
Feb	Aksoy	–	**30.3**	28.8	10.6	8.2	13.7	1.0	2.8	1.0	–	–	–	–	–	–	–	–	3.5	1.5
22–25 Feb	AREA	2,460	**33.1**	28.0	10.6	8.1	14.2	0.8	3.0	0.8	–	–	–	–	0.2	–	–	–	1.2	5.1
10–20 Feb	Artıbir / Gazete Duvar	–	**29.8**	27.2	13.4	6.8	14.1	1.6	4.2	1.9	–	–	–	–	–	–	–	–	1.0	2.6
12–17 Feb	MetroPoll	1,535	**32.2**	27.1	12.0	7.0	13.1	2.6	2.9	–	–	0.9	1.2	–	–	–	–	–	2.0	5.1
7–18 Feb	MAK	5,750	**31.1**	25.5	9.1	7.2	14.8	1.3	3.4	2.6	0.4	0.7	0.4	0.2	0.4	–	–	1.1	1.8 (Note: Free Cause Party – 0.9)	5.6
Feb	AR-G	1,787	**30.4**	28.1	10.4	7.7	13.8	1.4	3.8	2.0	–	0.2	0.8	–	0.5	0.3	–	0.2	0.4	2.3
Feb	ALF	7,250	**30.2**	25.1	8.7	8.5	13.8	1.6	3.4	4.0	–	0.7	0.8	1.4	0.5	–	–	0.7	0.6	5.1
8–13 Feb	ORC	5,130	**30.0**	24.1	8.1	9.4	15.1	1.5	2.6	4.2	–	0.9	1.0	1.4	0.5	–	–	0.9	0.3	5.9
7–10 Feb	ASAL	1,502	**32.9**	26.4	10.5	8.1	12.0	1.4	2.5	1.3	–	0.9	1.1	1.0	–	–	–	–	1.9	6.5
Feb	Optimar / En Son Haber	–	**36.5**	26.7	10.2	9.7	10.9	0.7	1.3	0.5	0.6	0.7	0.8	1.1	–	–	–	–	0.3	9.8
4–10 Feb	Yöneylem / Gazete Duvar	2,000	**32.9**	31.8	9.7	4.8	12.8	0.7	2.3	0.7	–	1.5	0.6	–	–	1.1	–	–	1.1	1.1
Feb	MOTTO / Anketler ve Raporlar	1,707	**31.8**	27.0	11.1	7.3	14.7	1.5	3.6	1.9	–	0.05	–	–	–	–	–	–	1.0	4.8
Feb	İEA	–	**33.1**	28.2	12.2	8.4	13.8	0.6	2.1	0.7	–	–	–	–	–	–	–	–	1.0	4.9
3–7 Feb	İEA	1,500	**33.0**	28.4	12.6	8.4	13.3	0.5	2.1	0.8	–	–	–	–	–	–	–	–	1.0	4.6
24–31 Jan	Avrasya	1,860	26.3	**28.4**	12.9	6.0	12.4	1.7	5.9	1.8	–	–	1.1	–	1.1	0.8	–	0.8	0.8	2.1
24–29 Jan	AREA	2,102	**32.0**	27.1	10.2	8.2	15.4	–	3.3	–	–	–	–	–	–	–	–	–	3.8	4.9
Jan	Artıbir	–	**31.2**	26.8	13.5	7.1	14.2	1.6	3.9	1.7	–	–	–	–	–	–	–	–	0.0	4.4
Jan	Gezici	–	**31.3**	27.2	11.5	8.1	12.1	1.2	2.1	1.4	0.9	1.0	1.3	0.2	0.3	0.2	1.1	–	0.1 (Note: Patriotic Party – 0.1)	4.1
Jan	AR-G	1,412	**31.5**	26.2	10.8	8.1	13.9	1.3	3.6	1.9	–	0.3	1.0	–	0.4	–	–	0.4	0.6	5.3
Jan	Aksoy / Cumhuriyet	–	**30.1**	28.9	10.6	7.9	13.6	1.0	2.7	1.3	–	–	–	–	–	–	–	–	3.9	1.2
17–22 Jan	ORC	5,420	**29.7**	24.3	8.4	9.1	14.2	1.7	2.8	3.6	0.4	1.1	1.2	1.5	0.7	0.2	–	0.8	0.3	5.4
8–17 Jan	MAK / Gazete Duvar	5,750	**31.9**	24.4	9.3	7.2	15.1	1.3	3.4	2.6	0.5	0.7	0.5	0.3	0.4	–	–	0.8	1.6 (Note: Free Cause Party – 0.9)	7.5
9–14 Jan	Avrasya	1,260	**30.6**	28.6	11.3	5.8	11.0	1.1	5.6	1.5	–	–	0.9	–	0.9	0.9	–	0.8	1.0	2.0
7–13 Jan	İEA / Gerçek Gündem	1,500	**32.5**	25.7	9.6	8.5	15.2	1.1	2.7	1.6	–	–	0.5	–	–	0.7	–	–	2.0	6.8
8–12 Jan	MetroPoll	1,508	**34.0**	28.4	11.6	5.9	13.3	–	2.6	–	–	–	–	–	–	–	–	–	4.3	5.6
Jan	Themis / Haber 3	1,279	**32.9**	23.1	12.2	6.8	11.6	2.6	3.1	1.4	1.5	–	1.9	–	–	–	2.4	–	0.6	9.8
Jan	TEAM	1,594	**38.2**	26.4	11.8	7.6	12.0	–	–	–	–	–	–	–	–	–	–	–	4.1	11.8
6–9 Jan	ASAL	1,725	**36.7**	23.8	10.0	8.9	11.9	1.1	1.5	1.0	–	0.8	1.2	1.1	–	–	–	–	2.0	12.9
4–8 Jan	ORC	7,100	**30.2**	24.2	8.4	8.5	15.3	1.6	2.9	3.1	–	0.8	1.3	1.4	0.5	–	–	0.7	1.1	6.0
3–7 Jan	Yöneylem / Diken	2,002	**32.3**	31.5	9.2	6.1	12.6	1.2	1.9	0.3	–	1.7	–	–	–	1.1	–	–	2.1	0.8
28 Dec 2021 – 2 Jan 2022	Sosyo Politik / Gazete Duvar	1,876	**32.8**	27.8	11.5	7.6	12.5	0.8	3.5	2.5	–	–	–	–	–	–	–	–	0.8	5.0
2018 parliamentary election		51,183,729	42.6	22.6	11.7	11.1	10.0	1.3	N/A	N/A	N/A	N/A	N/A	N/A	N/A	N/A	N/A	N/A	0.7	20.0

=== 2021 ===
Fieldwork date	Polling firm	Sample size																	Others	Lead
Fieldwork date	Polling firm	Sample size	AKP	CHP	HDP	MHP	İYİ	SP	DEVA	GP	BBP	YRP	MP	TDP	DP	TİP	ZP	BTP	Others	Lead
1–30 Dec	BUPAR	–	**30.5**	27.9	11.0	7.0	15.5	1.5	2.5	1.0	–	–	–	–	–	–	–	–	2.1	2.6
24–27 Dec	ORC	3,675	**30.8**	25.1	8.3	8.6	15.5	1.5	3.0	3.2	–	–	1.2	1.3	–	–	–	–	1.5	5.7
23–27 Dec	Avrasya	2,460	**29.0**	28.1	11.5	6.8	12.5	1.6	6.1	2.0	–	–	–	–	–	–	–	–	2.4	0.9
22 Dec	Aksoy	1,067	**31.2**	28.7	9.9	8.7	13.0	1.2	2.4	0.9	–	–	–	–	–	–	–	–	4.0	0.9
20–27 Dec	MAK	2,850	**32.3**	23.6	9.3	7.6	15.1	1.4	3.3	2.8	0.5	0.7	0.6	0.6	0.3	–	–	0.4	1.5 (Note: Free Cause Party – 0.9)	8.7
13–20 Dec	AREA	2,204	**30.5**	27.2	10.0	9.0	15.8	–	4.0	–	–	–	–	–	–	–	–	—N/a	3.5	3.3
14–15 Dec	Avrasya	1,260	28.4	**29.4**	11.0	6.8	12.6	1.4	5.8	2.4	–	–	–	–	–	–	–	—N/a	2.2	1.0
11–15 Dec	MetroPoll	1,514	**32.3**	27.4	11.9	5.3	14.2	1.5	2.8	1.1	–	–	1.6	–	–	–	–	—N/a	2.3	4.9
4–10 Dec	ASAL	1,500	**35.9**	23.1	10.4	8.6	12.7	0.9	1.8	1.1	–	0.8	1.5	1.2	–	–	–	—N/a	2.0	12.8
3 – 9 Dec	ORC	3,920	**30.3**	25.5	8.1	8.8	15.9	1.4	3.3	3.0	0.4	0.5	1.0	1.2	0.3	0.1	–	—N/a	0.2	4.8
Dec	İEA	N/A	**32.1**	24.6	10.8	8.3	16.4	1.0	2.5	1.3	–	–	0.7	–	–	–	–	—N/a	2.3	7.5
1 Dec – 4 Dec	Yöneylem	2,002	30.6	**32.2**	9.8	6.5	13.3	1.1	1.9	0.4	–	–	–	–	–	–	–	—N/a	4.2	1.6
27 Nov – 3 Dec	Avrasya	1,260	27.6	**30.4**	11.0	6.5	12.9	1.3	6.0	2.6	–	–	–	–	–	–	–	—N/a	1.7	2.8
26–30 Nov	AREA	1.514	**30.0**	28.2	10.0	9.1	14.0	–	4.4	–	–	–	–	–	–	–	–	—N/a	4.4	1.8
Nov	Aksoy	1.067	**30.8**	28.9	9.8	8.4	13.8	1.2	2.5	1.1	–	–	–	–	–	–	–	—N/a	3.6	1.9
Nov	MetroPoll	N/A	**34.3**	22.6	12.8	6.6	14.9	1.5	2.9	–	–	–	2.0	–	–	–	–	—N/a	2.5	11.7
12–18 Nov	MAK	5.750	**31.4**	24.5	9.6	8.0	14.9	1.4	2.6	2.6	0.6	0.9	0.8	0.4	0.5	–	–	—N/a	1.8 (Note: Free Cause Party – 0.9)	6.9
11–17 Nov	Avrasya	1,260	28.4	**30.1**	10.3	7.3	11.9	1.2	5.9	2.6	–	–	0.5	–	0.9	0.7	–	—N/a	0.2	1.7
Nov	ADA	2,423	**37.3**	23.2	8.9	9.0	13.4	0.9	1.9	1.1	–	1.2	1.6	–	–	–	–	—N/a	1.5	14.1
3–6 Nov	İEA	1,510	**29.9**	26.6	12.2	7.5	16.7	1.1	2.4	1.2	–	–	–	–	–	–	–	—N/a	2.4	3.3
Nov	PİAR	2,520	**30.6**	26.6	11.5	8.7	12.4	1.3	6.0	–	–	–	–	–	–	–	–	—N/a	2.9	4.0
27 Oct – 3 Nov	Yöneylem	2,000	**31.8**	30.3	10.6	6.4	13.1	0.8	1.2	0.7	–	1.1	–	–	–	0.7	–	—N/a	3.3	1.5
Oct	Aksoy	1,067	**30.7**	28.3	9.7	8.7	14.1	0.8	2.6	1.1	–	–	–	–	–	–	–	—N/a	4.0	2.4
28–31 Oct	AREA	1,580	**34.7**	27.7	8.8	8.7	12.7	–	3.1	–	–	–	–	–	–	–	–	—N/a	4.2	7.0
Oct	Artıbir	N/A	**30.1**	26.9	11.3	7.2	15.4	1.4	3.7	1.9	–	–	–	–	–	–	–	—N/a	2.1	3.2
23–28 Oct	Avrasya	2,460	**28.6**	28.5	10.0	7.0	13.2	1.3	5.7	3.0	–	–	0.5	–	1.1	1.0	–	—N/a	0.1	0.1
24–27 Oct	ORC	2,850	**31.3**	26.0	8.0	9.8	14.1	1.1	5.1	2.4	–	–	–	–	–	–	–	—N/a	2.2	5.3
Oct	MOTTO ve Bulgu	1,808	**32.4**	27.9	8.3	8.4	13.8	1.4	2.8	1.4	–	1.6	0.5	–	–	–	0.2	—N/a	1.3 (Note: Free Cause Party – 0.6)	4.5
11–21 Oct	MAK	5,750	**32.0**	23.5	9.0	8.0	14.7	1.4	2.7	2.6	–	–	1.0	–	–	–	–	—N/a	5.1	8.4
13–17 Oct	MetroPoll	1,568	**32.6**	25.2	11.8	7.4	14.3	1.7	2.7	–	–	–	1.6	–	–	–	–	—N/a	2.9	7.4
Oct	Areda Survey	N/A	**38.5**	25.3	9.2	9.9	12.1	–	1.7	1.1	–	–	–	–	–	–	–	—N/a	2.2	13.2
Oct	İEA	1,500	**32.7**	24.3	12.5	7.4	16.4	1.1	2.6	1.7	–	–	–	–	–	–	–	—N/a	1.4	8.4
9–14 Oct	Avrasya	1,500	**28.9**	28.7	10.6	6.6	13.5	1.3	5.5	2.7	–	–	–	–	–	–	–	—N/a	2.2	0.2
1–5 Oct	ORC	N/A	**31.9**	25.9	8.1	9.4	13.1	–	4.7	2.9	–	–	–	–	–	–	–	—N/a	4.0	6.0
27–30 Sep	AREA	2,474	**32.0**	24.1	11.1	10.1	13.0	2.1	2.2	2.1	–	–	1.2	1.2	–	–	–	—N/a	0.9	8.0
20–26 Sep	MetroPoll	N/A	**31.4**	25.4	10.7	10.0	15.0	–	2.8	–	–	–	1.7	–	–	–	–	—N/a	3.0	6.0
Sep	Yöneylem	N/A	**33.7**	26.5	10.2	8.8	13.7	1.4	1.7	–	–	1.3	–	–	–	1.0	–	—N/a	1.7	7.2
Sep	Aksoy	N/A	**30.8**	28.2	10.0	8.6	13.8	0.6	2.9	1.1	–	–	–	–	–	–	–	—N/a	4.0	2.6
19–27 Sep	Optimar	1,938	**39.0**	24.0	9.1	10.9	9.9	0.6	0.7	0.4	0.8	0.8	2.1	1.6	–	–	–	—N/a	0.0	15.0
Sep	KONDA	N/A	**32.7**	24.8	11.7	8.9	19.3	–	–	–	–	–	–	–	–	–	–	—N/a	2.6	7.9
Sep	Sosyo Politik	2,000	**32.3**	30.9	11.3	7.8	12.1	0.8	1.8	1.1	–	–	–	–	–	–	–	—N/a	1.9	1.4
Sep	GRIStatistics	1,050	**31.0**	24.5	9.3	7.0	16.3	0.9	4.2	2.4	–	–	0.9	–	–	–	–	—N/a	3.5	6.5
Sep	Avrasya	1,480	**28.2**	27.3	10.3	7.1	13.9	1.2	5.3	2.5	–	–	1.0	–	1.0	1.1	–	—N/a	1.1	0.9
Sep	MAK	5,700	**33.8**	23.8	7.9	7.7	14.6	1.3	2.8	2.8	1.1	0.9	0.9	0.4	–	–	–	—N/a	2.1 (Note: Free Cause Party – 0.9)	10.0
Sep	PIAR	2,405	**33.2**	23.7	10.9	9.4	14.1	1.1	4.4	–	–	–	–	–	–	–	–	—N/a	3.2	9.5
Sep	İEA	N/A	**29.9**	25.7	11.7	9.4	15.3	1.1	2.7	1.9	–	–	–	–	–	–	–	—N/a	2.2	4.2
1–5 Sep	ORC	4,180	**32.1**	25.3	7.9	9.7	12.7	1.2	4.5	2.5	–	–	1.6	0.8	–	–	–	—N/a	1.7	6.8
Aug	Yöneylem	3,040	**31.5**	27.1	10.3	8.2	14.7	1.1	1.7	0.6	–	–	0.6	–	–	0.6	–	—N/a	3.6	4.4
27–29 Aug	GRIStatistics	1,050	**32.1**	26.5	10.0	7.3	15.6	0.8	3.8	1.0	–	0.4	1.3	–	–	–	0.6	—N/a	0.6	5.6
21–28 Aug	Avrasya	2,460	**28.3**	26.6	9.6	7.1	14.1	1.3	5.8	2.7	–	–	1.3	–	1.1	1.0	—N/a	—N/a	1.1	1.7
19–23 Aug	Metropoll	1,717	**32.2**	23.5	12.4	11.3	14.6	1.5	0.9	–	–	–	1.2	–	–	–	—N/a	—N/a	2.4	8.2
Aug	AREA	N/A	**33.4**	24.9	10.9	9.1	15.4	–	–	–	–	–	–	–	–	–	—N/a	—N/a	6.4	8.5
Aug	Optimar	N/A	**40.0**	25.0	8.9	10.3	9.9	–	–	–	–	–	–	–	–	–	—N/a	—N/a	5.9	15.0
5–14 Aug	MAK	5,700	**33.9**	22.7	8.4	7.7	14.7	1.6	2.7	2.9	–	–	–	–	–	–	—N/a	—N/a	5.4	11.2
Aug	ALF	N/A	**32.7**	26.2	9.4	8.8	13.1	1.4	2.5	3.1	–	–	–	–	–	–	—N/a	—N/a	2.8	6.5
Aug	Avrasya	N/A	**30.3**	28.3	9.9	7.2	13.9	1.5	4.5	2.0	–	–	–	–	–	–	—N/a	—N/a	2.4	2.0
Aug	İEA	N/A	**32.4**	23.2	11.4	7.5	16.8	0.9	2.3	1.0	–	–	–	–	–	–	—N/a	—N/a	4.5	9.2
29 Jul – 3 Aug	Aksoy	1,067	**30.6**	28.7	9.3	8.0	13.3	0.8	2.6	1.7	–	–	–	–	–	–	—N/a	—N/a	4.8	1.9
Jul	KONDA	–	**36**	26	11	9	16	–	–	–	–	–	–	–	–	–	—N/a	—N/a	2	10
26–30 Jul	Yöneylem	3,040	**34.6**	28.4	9.2	6.9	14.3	0.8	1.4	0.4	–	–	0.4	–	–	0.7	—N/a	—N/a	2.9	6.2
24–29 Jul	Aksoy	1,067	**32.2**	27.7	10.0	8.1	13.9	1.3	2.8	1.2	–	–	–	–	–	–	—N/a	—N/a	2.8	4.5
24–29 Jul	Avrasya	2,460	**29.4**	25.9	11.0	7.4	14.4	1.3	4.6	2.3	–	–	1.1	–	0.9	1.0	—N/a	—N/a	0.7	3.5
Jul	AREA	N/A	**35.2**	23.7	10.1	10.0	14.4	–	3.2	–	–	–	–	–	–	–	—N/a	—N/a	3.3	11.5
19–23 Jul	Metropoll	1,740	**37.1**	24.1	12.3	9.2	12.9	1.5	1.1	–	–	–	–	–	–	–	—N/a	—N/a	1.8	13.1
13–18 Jul	ORC	4,520	**33.4**	25.0	8.0	9.8	12.5	1.3	2.2	2.9	0.7	0.8	1.5	1.0	0.5	–	—N/a	—N/a	0.4	8.4
10–13 Jul	Optimar	1,726	**40.5**	24.0	8.6	10.6	9.9	1.1	1.1	0.2	0.9	0.3	1.4	1.0	–	–	—N/a	—N/a	0.3 (Note: Patriotic Party – 0.2)	16.5
8–12 Jul	İEA	1,503	**35.5**	23.2	11.4	7.5	16.8	0.9	2.3	1.0	–	–	–	–	–	–	—N/a	—N/a	1.4	12.3
Jun	KONDA	–	**38**	22	12	8	14	–	–	–	–	–	–	–	–	–	—N/a	—N/a	6	16
Jun	Yöneylem	3,848	**35.4**	27.0	10.4	8.5	12.9	1.0	1.4	0.4	–	–	–	–	–	–	—N/a	—N/a	3.0	8.4
Jun	Metropoll	–	**38.4**	24.3	10.6	6.8	13.5	2.0	1.6	0.9	–	–	–	–	–	–	—N/a	—N/a	1.9	14.1
21–29 Jun	Artıbir	1,500	**31.4**	27.5	12.7	7.4	14.1	1.0	3.0	1.9	–	–	0.2	0.1	–	0.2	—N/a	—N/a	0.4 (Note: Patriotic Party – 0.2)	3.9
21–28 Jun	Sosyo Politik	1,008	**32.1**	29.6	12.7	7.1	13.8	0.2	3.2	1.3	–	–	–	–	–	–	—N/a	—N/a	–	2.5
23–28 Jun	Avrasya	2,460	**29.4**	26.9	11.1	7.1	15.0	1.4	4.5	2.0	0.1	0.1	0.8	0.6	0.8	–	—N/a	—N/a	0.2 (Note: Patriotic Party – 0.1, Communist Party of Turkey – 0.1)	2.5
Jun	Aksoy	–	**31.6**	27.5	9.6	8.2	13.6	1.0	2.9	2.0	–	–	–	–	–	–	—N/a	—N/a	3.7	4.1
Jun	ORC	–	**33.9**	25.3	8.1	10.4	12.0	1.4	2.1	1.6	0.6	0.7	1.6	1.1	0.4	–	—N/a	—N/a	0.8	8.6
Jun	İEA	–	**34.4**	22.3	12.7	9.5	16.2	0.8	2.2	0.9	–	–	–	–	–	–	—N/a	—N/a	1.0	12.1
Jun	Avrasya	–	**29.5**	26.9	11.0	8.3	14.7	1.2	4.1	1.5	0.1	0.2	0.9	0.1	0.7	0.6	—N/a	—N/a	0.1 (Note: Patriotic Party – 0.1)	2.6
Jun	Remres	–	**34.0**	22.9	9.6	9.9	13.8	1.9	2.7	1.7	–	–	2.5	–	–	–	—N/a	—N/a	1.0	11.1
2–7 Jun	AREA	2,402	**35.1**	23.1	10.1	10.1	14.1	1.0	2.5	1.0	–	–	1.7	1.1	–	–	—N/a	—N/a	0.2	12.0
May	MAK	–	**34.3**	23.0	9.2	8.4	13.6	1.8	2.2	2.8	1.1	0.6	–	–	–	–	—N/a	—N/a	3.0 (Note: Free Cause Party – 0.7)	11.3
May	KONDA	–	**37**	24	12	9	12	–	–	–	–	–	–	–	–	–	—N/a	—N/a	7	13
May	Yöneylem	–	**36.0**	26.7	10.2	7.8	13.5	0.7	1.4	0.5	–	–	–	–	–	–	—N/a	—N/a	3.2	9.3
May	Sandık Analiz	–	**34.6**	25.2	11.3	6.9	13.0	0.7	4.5	0.8	–	–	–	–	–	–	—N/a	—N/a	3.0	9.4
May	Aksoy	–	**32.3**	26.3	9.9	9.1	13.0	1.7	2.5	1.3	–	–	–	–	–	–	—N/a	—N/a	3.9	6.0
May	PİAR	–	**34.8**	22.7	10.7	10.2	14.8	1.2	2.2	1.2	–	–	1.5	–	–	–	—N/a	—N/a	0.7	12.1
May	Optimar	–	**39.1**	24.8	10.3	10.4	9.5	0.5	1.1	0.1	0.5	0.2	1.4	1.1	–	–	—N/a	—N/a	1.1 (Note: Patriotic Party – 0.4)	14.3
May	N/A	–	**35.1**	24.6	10.7	9.3	14.3	1.1	3.1	0.2	0.3	–	0.6	–	–	–	—N/a	—N/a	0.7 (Note: Patriotic Party – 0.2)	10.5
May	Avrasya	–	**31.5**	26.2	11.9	7.9	13.1	1.3	2.5	2.1	–	–	1.6	–	–	–	—N/a	—N/a	1.9	5.3
May	İEA	–	**33.9**	22.5	11.9	8.6	15.8	0.9	3.0	1.1	–	–	–	–	–	–	—N/a	—N/a	2.2	11.4
Apr	KONDA	–	**40**	22	12	8	13	–	–	–	–	–	–	–	–	–	—N/a	—N/a	5	18
Apr	Aksoy	1,067	**32.7**	26.1	10.1	10.2	12.6	1.3	2.4	1.9	–	–	–	–	–	–	—N/a	—N/a	2.7	6.6
Apr	Sandık Analiz	2,427	**34.5**	24.6	11.4	7.0	13.3	0.8	4.7	1.0	–	–	–	–	–	–	—N/a	—N/a	2.7	9.9
Apr	Optimar	–	**39.7**	24.1	10.8	10.9	9.8	0.6	1.1	0.2	0.5	0.4	–	1.0	–	–	—N/a	—N/a	0.8 (Note: Patriotic Party – 0.2)	15.6
Apr	Yöneylem	2,605	**37.6**	24.8	10.4	7.7	12.9	1.1	1.5	0.5	–	–	–	–	–	–	—N/a	—N/a	3.5	12.8
Apr	Avrasya	–	**32.0**	26.8	11.3	7.5	13.6	1.3	3.0	3.0	–	–	–	–	–	–	—N/a	—N/a	1.5	5.2
Apr	Metropoll	–	**34.1**	23.0	10.6	11.0	13.5	2.0	2.8	1.8	–	–	–	–	–	–	—N/a	—N/a	1.3	11.1
Apr	AREA	2,234	**34.4**	25.3	10.3	8.8	14.6	1.0	3.1	1.0	–	–	–	–	–	–	—N/a	—N/a	1.5	9.1
Apr	Objektif	–	**33.7**	26.0	10.7	7.2	13.6	1.3	2.9	3.0	–	–	–	–	–	–	—N/a	—N/a	1.6	7.7
Apr	Avrasya	–	**32.5**	27.3	10.1	7.6	13.1	1.8	3.0	3.0	–	–	–	–	–	–	—N/a	—N/a	1.6	5.2
Apr	İEA	–	**36.1**	23.3	11.3	8.6	15.3	0.7	2.7	1.1	–	–	–	–	–	–	—N/a	—N/a	0.9	12.8
Mar	KONDA	–	**40**	22	11	9	13	–	–	–	–	–	–	–	–	–	—N/a	—N/a	6	18
Mar	Aksoy	–	**34.7**	25.9	10.7	8.3	12.8	1.2	2.2	1.7	–	–	–	–	–	–	—N/a	—N/a	2.4	8.8
7–24 Mar	Sandık Analiz	–	**34.9**	24.1	11.7	7.2	13.8	0.8	4.6	0.8	–	–	–	–	–	–	—N/a	—N/a	2.1	10.8
Mar	Metropoll	–	**38.2**	23.3	11.1	9.5	12.1	1.2	1.6	–	–	–	–	–	–	–	—N/a	—N/a	3.0	14.9
Mar	Yöneylem	–	**38.6**	23.2	10.7	8.7	12.6	0.8	1.9	0.6	–	–	–	–	–	–	—N/a	—N/a	2.9	15.4
Mar	SAROS	–	**37.2**	20.6	12.9	10.3	9.4	1.2	3.6	2.5	–	–	1.5	–	–	–	—N/a	—N/a	0.8 (Note: Patriotic Party – 0.4)	16.6
26–31 Mar	Avrasya	2,460	**33.2**	26.8	9.7	6.9	13.8	1.3	2.9	3.1	–	–	–	–	1.1	–	—N/a	—N/a	1.2	6.4
Mar	AREA	–	**35.1**	24.0	12.0	9.4	14.0	1.9	1.6	1.2	–	–	–	–	–	–	—N/a	—N/a	0.7	11.1
Mar	Optimar	–	**38.4**	24.4	11.5	10.5	10.3	0.7	1.3	0.3	0.6	0.3	–	1.1	–	–	—N/a	—N/a	0.6	14.4
Mar	Avrasya	–	**34.4**	26.2	9.6	7.2	13.9	0.8	2.7	2.8	0.1	0.2	–	0.9	0.7	0.3	—N/a	—N/a	0.2	8.2
Mar	İEA	–	**35.4**	22.0	11.3	8.3	16.5	1.2	2.9	1.2	–	–	–	–	—N/a	—N/a	—N/a	—N/a	1.4	13.4
Feb	KONDA	–	**40**	22	11	9	12	–	–	–	–	–	–	–	—N/a	—N/a	—N/a	—N/a	5	18
Feb	Sandık Analiz	6,499	**36.5**	24.0	11.0	8.1	13.1	0.7	4.0	1.0	–	–	–	–	—N/a	—N/a	—N/a	—N/a	1.6	12.5
Feb	Yöneylem	–	**40.2**	25.1	9.7	9.1	10.5	1.1	1.6	0.4	–	–	–	–	—N/a	—N/a	—N/a	—N/a	1.7	15.1
Feb	MetroPoll	–	**39.4**	22.1	11.3	9.1	12.1	1.4	1.9	–	–	–	1.2	–	—N/a	—N/a	—N/a	—N/a	1.5	17.3
15–19 Feb	Sosyo Politik	1,802	**35.4**	28.3	10.4	7.9	9.4	1.1	3.8	1.9	–	–	–	–	—N/a	—N/a	—N/a	—N/a	1.8	7.1
Feb	Aksoy	–	**36.0**	26.3	8.7	9.9	13.5	1.1	2.1	1.9	–	–	–	–	—N/a	—N/a	—N/a	—N/a	0.5	9.7
Feb	Optimar	–	**40.5**	22.6	10.6	10.8	10.0	1.0	1.6	0.5	0.8	0.3	–	–	—N/a	—N/a	—N/a	—N/a	1.3	17.9
Feb	Avrasya	–	**34.8**	26.2	9.1	7.0	13.1	0.7	2.5	2.7	0.2	0.4	1.5	1.6	—N/a	—N/a	—N/a	—N/a	0.2 (Note: Patriotic Party – 0.2)	8.6
Feb	AREA	–	**36.1**	24.1	10.1	10.0	14.0	1.3	1.6	1.4	–	–	–	–	—N/a	—N/a	—N/a	—N/a	1.4	12.0
17–19 Feb	ORC	3,165	**36.8**	22.3	8.2	11.6	10.8	1.3	2.1	2.6	–	–	–	2.4	—N/a	—N/a	—N/a	—N/a	1.9	14.5
2–10 Feb	Avrasya	1,160	**34.1**	27.3	10.1	7.5	14.0	1.4	2.4	2.7	–	–	–	–	—N/a	—N/a	—N/a	—N/a	0.5	6.8
2 – 4 Feb	Areda Survey	2,486	**41.7**	21.8	9.3	11.6	10.3	0.8	1.8	0.4	–	–	–	–	—N/a	—N/a	—N/a	—N/a	2.4	19.9
10 Jan – 4 Feb	SONAR	3,200	**39.3**	22.6	10.2	10.5	13.1	1.2	1.1	–	–	–	–	–	—N/a	—N/a	—N/a	—N/a	2.0	16.7
Feb	İEA	–	**35.2**	21.1	10.6	9.6	15.6	1.0	3.8	1.7	–	–	–	–	—N/a	—N/a	—N/a	—N/a	1.4	14.1
Jan	KONDA	–	**40**	22	11	10	12	–	–	–	–	–	–	–	—N/a	—N/a	—N/a	—N/a	5	18
Jan	Sandık Analiz	4,850	**35.8**	24.2	11.4	7.8	12.7	0.8	4.6	1.3	–	–	–	–	—N/a	—N/a	—N/a	—N/a	1.4	11.6
Jan	SAROS	–	**37.6**	20.9	12.7	10.6	9.9	1.2	1.9	1.6	–	0.2	2.0	0.6	—N/a	—N/a	—N/a	—N/a	0.7 (Note: Patriotic Party – 0.5)	16.7
Jan	Yöneylem	–	**38.3**	26.0	10.3	10.1	11.2	0.8	1.4	0.3	–	–	–	—N/a	—N/a	—N/a	—N/a	—N/a	1.5	12.8
Jan	ADA	–	**38.7**	19.8	9.5	9.6	11.5	1.2	2.5	1.8	–	–	2.7	—N/a	—N/a	—N/a	—N/a	—N/a	2.7	18.9
Jan	Optimar	–	**40.5**	22.6	10.6	10.8	10.0	1.0	1.6	0.5	0.8	0.3	–	—N/a	—N/a	—N/a	—N/a	—N/a	1.3	17.9
Jan	AKP	–	**42.1**	23.4	11.6	11.5	9.4	–	0.2	0.2	–	–	–	—N/a	—N/a	—N/a	—N/a	—N/a	1.6	18.7
Jan	Aksoy	–	**35.2**	26.5	9.9	9.0	12.9	1.5	2.5	1.0	–	–	–	—N/a	—N/a	—N/a	—N/a	—N/a	1.4	8.7
Jan	MetroPoll	–	**37.2**	26.0	9.8	8.5	12.3	2.2	1.4	1.1	–	–	–	—N/a	—N/a	—N/a	—N/a	—N/a	1.5	11.2
21–27 Jan	Avrasya	2,184	**35.6**	25.3	10.5	8.1	13.4	0.8	2.9	3.0	–	–	–	—N/a	—N/a	—N/a	—N/a	—N/a	0.3	10.3
Jan	MAK	–	**35.6**	24.9	8.9	8.5	13.6	1.6	2.3	2.5	–	–	–	—N/a	—N/a	—N/a	—N/a	—N/a	2.1	10.7
6–10 Jan	Avrasya	1,460	**35.0**	25.0	10.7	9.5	13.0	0.8	2.5	2.6	–	–	–	—N/a	—N/a	—N/a	—N/a	—N/a	0.8	10.0
4–9 Jan	Artıbir	1,500	**34.5**	26.2	11.6	8.4	11.5	1.1	4.1	2.6	–	–	–	—N/a	—N/a	—N/a	—N/a	—N/a	–	8.3
Jan	İEA	–	**36.2**	20.3	10.5	9.1	16.7	0.6	3.6	1.3	–	–	–	—N/a	—N/a	—N/a	—N/a	—N/a	1.7	15.9
2018 parliamentary election		51,183,729	42.6	22.6	11.7	11.1	10.0	1.3	N/A	N/A	N/A	N/A	N/A	N/A	N/A	N/A	N/A	N/A	0.7	20.0

=== 2020 ===
Fieldwork date	Polling firm	Sample size												Others	Lead
Fieldwork date	Polling firm	Sample size	AKP	CHP	HDP	MHP	İYİ	SP	DEVA	GP	BBP	YRP	MP	Others	Lead
Dec	TEAM	9,281	37.2	25.1	10.9	10.3	10.5	–	2.7	1.2	–	–	–	2.1	12.1
Dec	Sandık Analiz	4,820	36.9	24.1	10.7	8.6	11.7	0.8	4.5	1.3	–	–	–	1.3	12.8
Dec	KONDA	–	39.8	22.2	10.7	9.8	10.5	–	–	–	–	–	–	6.9	17.6
Dec	Aksoy	2,400	34.8	27.2	8.9	9.0	13.1	1.6	3.1	1.8	–	–	–	0.6	7.6
Dec	MetroPoll	–	38.9	25.4	11.1	7.6	11.3	0.8	2.2	1.7	–	–	–	1.0	13.5
Dec	Avrasya	–	33.3	26.6	10.5	10.0	13.5	0.6	2.5	2.8	–	–	–	0.2	6.7
14–18 Dec	AREA	2,564	39.3	22.4	10.4	10.5	11.1	1.0	3.1	0.7	–	–	–	1.3	16.9
Dec	MAK	2,850	37.0	24.8	9.2	8.8	12.5	1.5	2.2	2.5	–	–	–	1.5	12.2
3–9 Dec	Optimar	2,253	41.2	23.7	8.4	11.1	10.9	0.9	–	–	–	–	–	3.8	17.5
Dec	İEA	–	39.7	18.7	11.3	9.0	14.0	0.7	4.2	1.1	–	–	–	1.3	21.0
27 Nov – 7 Dec	Objektif	16,000	34.0	26.7	10.5	11.2	11.0	1.2	2.1	2.7	–	–	–	0.6	7.3
11 Nov – 4 Dec	Kadir Has University	1,000	38.3	27.0	10.8	10.0	11.8	0.9	0.5	0.3	–	–	–	0.4	11.3
Dec	Gezici	–	36.6	26.2	10.2	8.8	9.6	–	6.6	–	–	–	–	2.0	10.4
26 Nov – 1 Dec	ORC	3,820	36.1	25.4	9.3	12.7	10.4	1.1	1.9	2.5	–	–	–	0.6	10.7
Nov	KONDA	–	37	22	11	10	13	–	–	–	–	–	–	5	17
Nov	SAROS	–	39.4	21.8	13.3	10.8	10.0	–	2.2	0.8	–	–	1.1	0.6	17.6
Nov	Sandık Analiz	–	35.1	25.2	11.1	10.0	10.7	0.9	4.5	1.1	–	–	—N/a	1.4	9.9
Nov	MetroPoll	–	41.3	22.4	10.4	9.1	11.2	1.5	2.2	0.8	–	–	—N/a	1.1	18.9
23–27 Nov	AREA	2,230	36.2	23.7	10.4	9.0	13.7	1.5	3.5	1.7	–	–	—N/a	0.2	12.5
21–26 Nov	Avrasya	2,460	33.2	26.4	11.5	8.6	13.4	0.9	2.8	2.8	–	–	—N/a	0.4	6.8
14–24 Nov	MAK	5,700	38.7	24.0	9.2	9.1	11.6	1.4	2.3	2.3	–	–	—N/a	1.4	14.7
Nov	GENAR	3,000	42.1	22.8	9.7	10.3	10.1	1.7	1.0	0.6	0.6	–	—N/a	1.1	19.3
Nov	Aksoy	–	36.0	24.9	9.5	9.1	13.6	0.8	3.4	1.5	–	–	—N/a	1.2	11.1
Nov	Optimar	–	41.9	24.0	10.5	10.1	8.7	1.1	1.2	1.0	0.7	0.2	—N/a	0.6 (Note: Patriotic Party – 0.1)	17.9
Nov	İEA	–	37.5	20.1	11.3	9.3	16.2	0.6	2.9	1.1	–	–	—N/a	1.0	17.4
Nov	Artıbir	–	36.0	26.5	11.7	9.4	11.2	–	2.5	1.4	–	–	—N/a	1.3	9.5
Nov	Sandık Analiz	–	34.3	26.9	11.5	10.1	9.7	1.2	3.8	–	–	–	—N/a	2.4	7.4
30 Oct–3 Nov	Areda Survey	3,055	42.3	23.3	9.2	11.5	9.5	1.0	0.9	0.3	–	–	—N/a	2.0	19.0
Oct	KONDA	–	38	22	11	11	9	–	–	–	–	–	—N/a	8	16
Oct	MetroPoll	–	38.2	23.1	11.4	10.6	11.5	1.3	2.0	1.2	–	–	—N/a	0.7	15.1
19–24 Oct	Avrasya	2,460	32.6	28.2	11.6	8.9	12.7	0.3	3.2	2.0	–	–	—N/a	0.5	4.4
Oct	AREA	–	37.7	23.8	11.6	11.0	12.1	0.9	1.5	0.7	–	–	—N/a	0.7	13.9
2–6 Oct	Areda Survey	3,000	42.1	23.6	9.2	10.7	9.7	0.7	1.8	0.2	0.2	–	—N/a	1.8 (Note: Patriotic Party – 0.3)	18.5
Oct	MAK	–	38.0	24.6	10.5	8.7	11.6	1.4	2.3	2.4	–	–	—N/a	2.2	13.4
Oct	Optimar	2,047	41.4	23.8	10.5	9.5	9.3	–	1.5	1.0	0.7	0.4	—N/a	1.9 (Note: Patriotic Party – 0.1)	17.6
Oct	N/A	–	35.1	28.0	11.0	7.1	12.0	0.5	2.5	2.5	–	–	—N/a	1.3	7.1
Oct	İEA	–	40.2	20.0	11.4	8.8	15.7	–	2.1	1.0	–	–	—N/a	0.7	20.2
Sep	TEAM	9,281	36.6	25.2	11.6	10.2	9.7	–	2.6	1.3	–	–	—N/a	2.8	11.4
Sep	Yöneylem	–	34.4	27.8	11.8	8.6	11.0	1.2	3.0	1.3	–	–	—N/a	0.9	6.6
Sep	SAROS	–	39.2	23.8	11.9	9.6	9.1	–	3.0	2.1	–	–	—N/a	1.3	15.4
Sep	KONDA	–	36.7	21.6	11.5	10.6	14.8	–	–	–	–	–	—N/a	4.8	15.1
Sep	MetroPoll	–	41.6	22.8	10.4	9.4	11.3	1.5	1.3	0.9	–	–	—N/a	0.9	18.8
27–30 Sep	AREA	3,088	40.0	22.7	10.4	10.2	12.4	1.1	1.3	1.1	–	–	—N/a	0.8	17.3
Sep	Avrasya	–	37.3	27.2	10.7	8.5	11.7	0.5	1.8	2.0	–	–	—N/a	0.3	10.1
Sep	MAK	–	38.6	24.1	8.7	8.6	12.0	1.3	2.2	2.3	–	–	—N/a	2.2	14.5
Sep	İEA	–	43.3	22.3	10.4	7.6	10.7	1.2	2.4	1.2	–	–	—N/a	0.9	21.0
Aug	MetroPoll	–	39.5	26.8	9.6	9.4	9.6	1.8	1.0	0.9	–	–	—N/a	1.5	12.7
Aug	Avrasya	–	36.9	28.1	10.6	7.1	11.4	0.4	2.7	2.6	–	–	—N/a	0.2	8.8
Aug	Optimar	–	43.1	22.0	10.4	10.6	9.8	0.7	1.4	0.4	0.6	0.4	—N/a	0.6 (Note: Patriotic Party – 0.4)	21.1
22–25 Aug	AREA	2,210	38.0	22.7	10.8	10.8	11.5	1.8	1.7	1.3	–	–	—N/a	1.3	15.3
Aug	SONAR	–	39.8	27.2	8.3	11.3	10.4	–	–	–	–	–	—N/a	3.0	10.6
Aug	ORC	–	36.6	25.9	9.6	14.1	8.1	0.8	2.3	1.6	–	–	—N/a	1.0	10.7
Aug	İEA	–	39.1	22.6	10.8	11.4	10.7	1.2	2.3	1.1	–	–	—N/a	0.8	16.5
5–6 Aug	Aksoy	1,067	38.3	26.2	9.6	8.5	9.2	1.2	3.4	2.5	–	–	—N/a	1.1	12.1
18–26 Jul	ArtıBir	1,500	36.9	27.3	11.7	8.9	11.0	1.1	1.9	1.3	–	–	—N/a	–	9.6
25–27 Jul	AREA	2,212	39.1	24.4	10.3	8.0	10.1	1.2	2.7	2.2	–	–	—N/a	1.9	14.7
Jul	Optimar	–	41.5	22.9	10.5	10.1	8.5	–	1.3	1.3	–	–	—N/a	3.9 (Note: Free Cause Party – 0.3, Patriotic Party – 0.2)	18.6
Jul	Metropoll	–	42.1	26.0	10.1	7.6	8.7	1.0	1.6	2.5	–	–	—N/a	0.3	16.1
Jul	Avrasya	–	35.0	28.4	11.7	7.4	12.4	–	2.2	2.3	–	–	—N/a	0.6	6.6
15 Jun – 8 Jul	ORC	5,356	37.3	26.2	10.4	13.0	6.8	1.1	2.6	1.7	–	–	—N/a	0.9	11.1
Jul	İEA	–	40.7	20.8	11.7	10.6	10.3	1.1	2.7	0.9	–	–	—N/a	1.1	19.9
Jun	TEAM	9,281	37.0	27.0	11.1	9.2	8.8	–	2.6	1.7	–	–	—N/a	2.6	10.0
Jun	AREA	–	37.0	24.6	10.5	10.1	11.0	1.2	3.3	1.2	–	–	—N/a	1.1	12.4
Jun	SAROS	–	39.9	23.6	12.1	10.3	9.1	–	1.7	2.3	–	–	—N/a	0.9	16.3
Jun	MetroPoll	–	37.2	29.5	10.9	7.6	8.6	1.2	2.3	1.7	–	–	—N/a	1.0	7.7
8–14 Jun	Sosyo Politik	1,248	35.1	24.1	11.8	9.0	8.2	1.6	6.0	4.2	–	–	—N/a	–	11.0
Jun	İEA	–	39.0	20.5	13.7	11.3	11.7	1.3	1.6	0.6	–	–	—N/a	0.3	18.5
Jun	MAK	–	35.5	25.3	9.3	10.8	11.0	1.2	2.8	2.9	–	–	—N/a	1.2	10.2
9–12 Jun	Avrasya	1,410	35.1	28.0	12.0	7.1	12.1	–	3.0	2.4	–	–	—N/a	0.3	7.1
May	SAROS	–	38.8	22.6	13.1	10.8	9.6	–	2.1	2.2	–	–	—N/a	0.8	16.2
May	MetroPoll	–	38.5	27.1	10.5	9.1	9.6	0.9	1.6	1.6	–	–	—N/a	0.8	11.3
19–23 May	Yöneylem	2,478	37.9	29.7	9.9	9.3	9.3	1.3	1.3	0.8	–	–	—N/a	0.5	8.2
May	AREA	–	39.0	24.5	10.0	8.0	12.0	1.9	2.6	1.4	–	–	—N/a	0.6	14.5
May	İEA	–	42.4	21.3	11.5	8.8	11.6	1.9	0.5	0.7	–	–	—N/a	1.3	21.1
20–23 May	Avrasya	2,460	34.5	30.6	10.4	8.2	10.2	0.5	3.0	2.3	–	–	—N/a	0.3	4.8
May	AR-G	1,258	34.4	26.6	10.6	9.8	10.7	1.3	2.7	2.9	–	–	—N/a	1.0	8.3
May	Optimar	–	42.8	23.4	9.5	10.2	9.1	–	1.3	1.1	–	–	—N/a	2.7	19.4
May	ORC	–	38.4	25.6	10.3	14.1	6.4	1.1	1.0	1.9	–	–	—N/a	1.2	12.8
11 May	MAK	5,200	37.4	25.3	9.4	10.7	10.9	1.1	1.7	2.4	–	–	—N/a	1.1	12.1
Apr	GENAR	–	45.4	23.5	10.3	9.8	8.3	–	0.6	0.5	–	–	—N/a	1.6	21.9
27–29 Apr	AREA	2,220	35.8	24.8	12.1	9.6	11.8	–	2.0	–	–	–	—N/a	3.9	11.0
Apr	MetroPoll	–	42.4	24.6	9.1	10.0	9.8	0.7	2.1	0.7	–	–	—N/a	0.6	17.8
21–28 Apr	Avrasya	2,460	34.0	28.4	11.1	9.0	11.7	0.5	2.7	2.5	–	–	—N/a	0.3	5.6
20–29 Apr	Yöneylem	2,409	38.5	24.6	12.8	9.4	8.0	1.1	2.3	2.4	–	–	—N/a	0.9	13.9
Apr	İEA	–	38.7	22.8	12.0	13.2	10.5	1.2	0.3	0.5	–	–	—N/a	0.8	15.9
Mar	MetroPoll	–	44.1	23.1	9.8	9.3	8.4	1.7	1.4	1.2	–	–	—N/a	1.0	21.0
Mar	ADA	–	38.3	22.6	9.7	11.2	10.5	1.3	3.4	2.0	–	0.6	—N/a	0.4	15.7
18–25 Mar	Yöneylem	2,605	40.2	26.4	11.7	9.3	8.0	0.9	1.8	1.2	–	–	—N/a	0.5	13.8
7–8 Mar	KONDA	–	39.4	24.0	12.2	11.8	11.1	–	–	–	–	–	—N/a	1.4	15.4
Mar	Artıbir	–	35.4	30.1	10.1	10.0	10.5	1.6	–	1.3	–	–	—N/a	1.0	5.3
Mar	İEA	–	41.6	21.2	12.9	10.0	11.7	0.7	–	0.7	–	–	—N/a	1.2	20.4
Feb	TEAM	9,281	36.9	25.9	11.1	10.7	10.2	–	1.1	1.9	–	–	—N/a	2.2	11.0
Feb	KONDA	–	38.4	22.3	12.4	11.2	13.8	–	–	–	–	–	—N/a	1.9	16.1
Feb	Metropoll	–	41.8	25.5	10.4	10.5	8.6	1.0	0.7	1.2	–	–	—N/a	0.3	16.3
Feb	AREA	–	38.1	24.4	11.6	11.1	10.7	–	–	–	–	–	—N/a	4.1	13.7
Feb	AR-G	1,322	36.1	26.6	11.7	10.3	9.8	1.4	–	1.9	–	1.1	—N/a	1.1	9.5
Feb	Artıbir	–	37.4	28.9	10.1	9.9	10.5	1.1	–	1.3	–	–	—N/a	0.8	8.5
Feb	Polimetre	–	30.0	25.3	12.8	8.9	11.1	1.5	–	–	–	–	—N/a	10.5	4.7
23 Jan – 2 Feb	Themis	1,925	38.0	29.3	8.0	10.0	7.3	3.3	–	0.7	–	–	—N/a	3.3	8.7
Feb	IEA	–	39.7	25.1	10.5	9.2	10.8	0.3	–	1.1	–	–	—N/a	3.3	14.5
31 Jan – 3 Feb	Areda Survey	2,987	40.5	24.6	11.6	9.0	9.0	0.7	1.6	1.7	–	–	—N/a	1.2	15.9
Jan	Polimetre	–	30.2	25.4	12.6	8.9	11.1	1.5	–	–	–	–	—N/a	10.5	4.8
Jan	MetroPoll	–	40.0	25.5	12.1	10.1	8.3	1.2	0.8	1.2	–	–	—N/a	0.8	14.5
Jan	AREA	–	36.2	24.8	12.9	11.3	11.1	–	–	–	–	–	—N/a	3.8	10.4
Jan	Optimar	–	42.2	24.2	10.4	11.2	9.2	–	0.5	1.0	–	–	—N/a	1.3	18.0
10–24 Jan	Yöneylem	2,507	38.2	24.5	11.3	9.6	8.0	–	2.4	4.0	–	–	—N/a	2.0	13.7
Jan	IEA	–	38.5	22.1	13.0	9.3	10.0	1.3	–	1.1	–	–	—N/a	4.7	16.4
2–9 Jan	Artıbir	1,500	38.0	27.3	8.5	11.3	10.1	1.6	–	2.3	–	–	—N/a	0.9	10.7
2018 parliamentary election		51,183,729	42.6	22.6	11.7	11.1	10.0	1.3	N/A	N/A	N/A	N/A	N/A	0.7	20.0

=== 2019 ===
Fieldwork date	Polling firm	Sample size											Others	Lead
Fieldwork date	Polling firm	Sample size	AKP	CHP	HDP	MHP	İYİ	SP	DEVA	GP	BBP	YRP	Others	Lead
28–31 Dec	ORC	2,980	**36.1**	27.1	9.3	16.3	4.9	0.9	–	2.2	–	–	3.3	9.0
Dec	TEAM	9,281	**35.9**	26.3	11.4	11.0	9.1	1.4	1.6	1.2	–	–	2.1	9.6
13–15 Dec	Public Status	4,150	**43.0**	24.9	10.0	12.0	7.7	–	0.5	0.2	–	–	1.7	18.1
12–15 Dec	Optimar	–	**42.0**	22.6	12.4	10.1	8.5	1.1	0.6	0.6	0.5	0.4	1.2 (Note: Patriotic Party – 0.4)	19.4
Dec	AREA	–	**38.3**	25.8	10.5	10.6	10.6	–	–	–	–	–	4.2	12.5
Dec	MetroPoll	–	**41.0**	24.8	11.0	9.8	8.3	0.8	1.7	2.0	–	–	0.6	16.2
Dec	MAK	–	**38.0**	24.9	9.9	11.9	11.7	1.2	–	–	–	–	4.4	13.1
25 Nov – 13 Dec	Kadir Has University	1,000	**40.2**	33.0	9.2	8.3	8.1	–	–	–	–	–	1.2	6.8
Dec	AR-G	1,878	**36.8**	26.9	12.1	10.9	9.4	1.4	–	1.2	–	–	1.3	9.9
Dec	IEA	–	**40.1**	24.9	11.6	8.6	10.0	–	–	–	–	–	4.6	15.2
19–24 Nov	PIAR	2,416	**31.9**	24.7	10.2	10.6	9.0	1.7	7.7	3.4	–	–	0.8	7.2
9–12 Nov	ORC	4,156	**36.6**	28.9	9.5	17.2	3.9	1.5	–	–	–	–	2.3	7.7
Nov	Metropoll	–	**42.0**	24.0	12.2	11.0	9.6	0.9	–	–	–	–	0.3	18.0
Nov	AREA	–	**38.3**	23.3	12.6	11.8	10.5	–	–	–	–	–	3.5	15.0
Nov	KONDA	–	**40.0**	23.1	13.6	12.9	9.0	–	–	–	–	–	1.4	16.9
Nov	IEA	–	**37.8**	25.8	11.0	11.4	10.1	–	–	–	–	–	3.9	12.0
29 Oct – 1 Nov	Sosyo Politik	1,937	**38.3**	27.7	10.3	7.8	4.8	0.9	2.4	3.9	–	–	3.9 (Note: Free Cause Party – 0.3, Communist Party of Turkey – 0.1)	10.6
Oct	IEA	–	**40.2**	24.8	13.7	8.2	10.3	–	–	–	–	–	3.3	15.4
Oct	GENAR	–	**40.0**	26.0	11.0	11.5	7.5	–	–	–	–	–	4.0	14.0
Oct	AREA	–	**37.0**	24.1	12.4	11.4	10.8	–	–	–	–	–	4.2	12.9
Oct	Metropoll	–	**43.2**	23.4	10.7	11.9	9.3	1.1	–	–	–	–	0.4	19.8
21–28 Oct	ADA	1,700	**41.9**	21.3	7.5	8.4	7.5	2.3	–	–	–	–	9.2	20.6
8 Oct	Polimetre	–	**37.3**	25.9	13.1	9.9	11.5	1.5	–	–	–	–	0.8	11.4
Sep	AR-G	N/A	**37.8**	28.4	9.2	11.1	7.7	1.2	–	–	–	–	4.6	9.4
Sep	Metropoll	–	**40.2**	24.5	12.0	10.7	10.5	1.6	–	–	–	–	0.4	16.2
5–10 Sep	Optimar	1,708	**40.5**	26.7	9.3	10.9	9.0	2.0	–	–	–	–	1.7	13.8
6–9 Sep	ORC	3,620	**35.7**	30.9	9.4	16.6	4.5	2.0	–	–	–	–	0.8	4.1
1–7 Sep	Avrasya	N/A	29.9	**30.8**	11.7	16.0	8.9	–	–	–	–	–	2.7	0.9
Aug	N/A	N/A	**39.0**	27.0	11.0	9.9	10.1	–	–	–	–	–	3.0	12.0
19–30 Aug	ADA	1,721	**37.5**	22.8	9.0	9.5	7.0	0.9	–	–	–	–	13.3	14.7
2–7 Aug	SAROS	3,012	**32.5**	25.2	13.4	10.5	9.1	–	4.4	4.2	–	–	0.7	7.3
2–7 Aug	SAROS	3,012	**38.6**	24.7	13.5	10.5	10.8	–	–	–	–	–	1.9	13.9
6–11 Jul	PİAR	2,460	**36.7**	29.1	12.2	10.8	9.1	1.6	—N/a	—N/a	–	–	0.5	7.6
15–20 May	MAK	11,000	**40.7**	28.5	11.3	8.0	8.0	1.2	—N/a	—N/a	–	–	2.3	12.2
Apr	Avrasya	N/A	**34.0**	27.0	10.4	15.6	11.1	1.4	—N/a	—N/a	–	–	0.4	7.0
**31 Mar**	**Local elections**	**48.271.511**	**42.5**	**29.6**	**5.6**	**7.2**	**7.4**	**3.0**	—N/a	—N/a	–	–	**6.6**	16.9
9–19 Mar	AREA	5,150	**37.5**	25.8	12.1	9.6	13.2	–	—N/a	—N/a	–	–	1.7	12.3
7 Jan – 3 Feb	AREA	2,060	**37.1**	25.2	12.2	11.6	12.3	–	—N/a	—N/a	–	–	1.7	11.9
13–19 Jan	PİAR	9,298	**35.0**	25.9	11.0	13.6	12.1	–	—N/a	—N/a	–	–	2.4	9.1
28 Dec – 3 Jan	Optimar	2,523	**45.5**	28.6	7.6	7.6	7.7	1.4	—N/a	—N/a	–	–	1.6	16.9
2018 parliamentary election		51,183,729	42.6	22.6	11.7	11.1	10.0	1.3	N/A	N/A	N/A	N/A	0.7	20.0

=== 2018 ===
Fieldwork date	Polling firm	Sample size							Others	Lead
Fieldwork date	Polling firm	Sample size	AKP	CHP	HDP	MHP	İYİ	SP	Others	Lead
Dec	AREA	N/A	38.8	25.0	10.8	11.2	12.2	–	2.0	13.8
Nov	CHP	N/A	42.2	23.3	–	12.4	9.3	–	–	18.9
Nov	AREA	N/A	40.2	25.1	10.7	13.0	9.5	–	1.9	15.1
Oct	MetroPoll	N/A	40.7	25.4	9.9	12.3	9.2	1.9	0.6	15.3
15–21 Oct	PİAR	2,406	37.2	26.5	10.7	13.6	10.5	1.0	1.0	10.7
14–19 Jul	MAK	2,990	45.5	22.9	10.9	10.9	7.6	1.1	1.1	22.6
Jul	ORC	N/A	44.7	24.7	8.9	12.3	8.3	–	1.1	20.0
2018 parliamentary election		51,183,729	42.6	22.6	11.7	11.1	10.0	1.3	0.7	20.0

== Monthly averages ==
=== Text summary ===
Date																	Others	Lead
Date	AKP	CHP	HDP / YSGP	MHP	İYİ	SP	DEVA	GP	BBP	YRP	MP	TDP	DP	TİP	ZP	BTP	Others	Lead
May 2023 (29)	37.26	28.52	9.92	7.47	10.20	w. CHP	w. CHP	w. CHP	0.60	1.19	1.56	w. CHP	w. CHP	1.80	1.49	–	1.93	8.74
April 2023 (40)	36.41	28.83	10.00	7.12	10.03	w. CHP	w. CHP	w. CHP	0.68	1.31	2.70	w. CHP	w. CHP	1.69	0.92	–	1.96	7.58
March 2023 (22)	33.54	27.55	10.43	6.57	10.28	0.82	1.58	1.28	0.38	1.42	3.61	0.83	0.43	1.63	1.56	1.13	1.90	5.99
February 2023 (8)	34.06	26.11	10.28	6.69	13.45	0.87	1.64	1.03	0.73	1.32	1.56	0.95	0.30	0.90	1.62	–	2.76	7.95
January 2023 (15)	33.83	25.65	9.74	6.59	14.77	0.97	2.23	1.79	0.78	1.12	0.78	1.46	0.27	0.50	1.54	1.58	2.91	8.18
December 2022 (19)	33.80	26.09	10.16	7.38	13.26	0.86	2.07	1.52	0.51	1.23	0.79	1.22	0.20	0.85	2.13	1.05	2.22	7.71
November 2022 (16)	33.63	26.28	10.17	7.37	13.59	0.89	2.20	1.18	0.61	1.28	0.65	1.28	0.27	0.68	1.57	1.13	1.73	7.35
October 2022 (15)	32.37	26.75	9.93	7.37	13.43	0.99	2.05	1.62	0.97	1.41	0.86	1.35	0.50	1.02	2.17	1.68	1.46	5.62
September 2022 (15)	31.83	26.57	10.45	7.51	13.63	0.95	2.37	1.02	1.20	1.34	0.65	1.47	0.50	1.13	2.08	1.73	1.73	5.26
August 2022 (17)	31.09	27.55	9.82	7.40	14.12	0.99	2.42	1.10	0.93	1.47	0.79	1.63	0.60	1.30	2.04	1.43	2.30	3.54
July 2022 (14)	31.26	27.05	10.31	7.29	14.17	1.08	2.84	1.32	0.90	1.43	1.05	1.85	0.50	1.00	2.21	1.87	2.90	4.21
June 2022 (19)	30.64	26.68	10.35	7.36	14.74	1.26	2.91	1.29	0.92	1.16	0.70	0.98	0.50	0.90	1.75	1.53	2.01	3.96
May 2022 (19)	31.03	26.34	10.48	7.46	15.12	1.11	2.41	1.43	0.67	1.18	0.80	1.20	0.53	1.13	2.31	1.40	2.23	4.69
April 2022 (19)	31.53	26.65	10.62	7.68	14.30	1.17	2.72	1.47	0.43	1.15	0.76	0.90	0.50	1.20	0.86	0.86	1.76	4.88
March 2022 (18)	31.73	26.33	10.40	7.93	13.91	1.25	2.89	1.54	0.47	0.95	0.69	0.86	0.61	0.87	0.80	0.78	2.07	5.40
February 2022 (16)	31.61	27.44	10.74	7.77	13.40	1.23	2.98	1.71	0.53	0.76	0.85	1.00	0.56	0.68	1.20	0.72	1.11	4.17
January 2022 (17)	32.01	26.64	10.75	7.49	13.31	1.38	3.22	1.84	0.83	0.91	1.09	0.90	0.61	0.65	1.75	0.72	1.71	5.37
December 2021 (14)	31.02	27.21	10.32	7.58	14.14	1.28	3.49	1.87	0.45	0.67	1.10	1.08	0.30	0.10	–	0.40	2.19	3.81
November 2021 (10)	31.21	27.14	10.67	7.75	13.80	1.19	3.58	1.70	0.60	1.07	1.23	0.40	0.70	0.70	–	–	2.50	4.07
October 2021 (13)	32.02	26.81	9.84	8.07	13.88	1.23	3.39	1.95	–	1.35	0.90	–	1.10	0.85	0.20	–	2.69	5.21
September 2021 (13)	32.32	25.71	10.16	8.88	14.13	1.12	3.00	1.87	0.95	1.00	1.34	1.00	1.00	1.05	–	–	2.15	6.61
August 2021 (11)	32.49	25.70	10.05	8.41	14.19	1.21	2.98	1.88	–	0.40	1.10	–	1.10	0.80	0.60	–	3.63	6.79
July 2021 (10)	34.45	25.67	10.09	8.65	13.84	1.13	2.37	1.39	0.80	0.55	1.10	1.00	0.70	0.85	—N/a	–	2.04	8.78
June 2021 (12)	33.60	25.44	10.88	8.44	13.98	1.17	2.75	1.38	0.27	0.33	1.28	0.60	0.63	0.40	—N/a	–	1.66	8.16
May 2021 (10)	34.86	24.60	10.81	8.76	13.26	1.10	2.50	1.12	0.63	0.40	1.28	1.10	–	–	—N/a	–	2.67	10.26
April 2021 (11)	35.21	24.85	10.82	8.59	13.21	1.19	2.72	1.65	0.50	0.40	–	1.00	–	–	—N/a	–	2.23	10.36
March 2021 (11)	36.37	23.86	11.11	8.66	12.93	1.11	2.53	1.58	0.35	0.25	1.50	1.00	0.90	0.30	—N/a	–	1.94	12.51
February 2021 (14)	37.57	23.99	10.02	9.41	12.25	1.08	2.33	1.56	0.50	0.35	1.35	2.00	–	–	—N/a	–	1.66	13.58
January 2021 (15)	37.44	23.71	10.61	9.47	12.21	1.14	2.33	1.52	0.80	0.25	2.35	0.60	–	–	—N/a	–	1.79	13.73
December 2020 (14)	37.36	24.68	10.21	9.81	11.56	1.01	2.97	1.69	–	–	–	–	–	–	—N/a	–	1.69	12.68
November 2020 (17)	37.61	24.30	10.64	10.02	11.52	1.13	2.36	1.39	0.65	0.20	1.10	–	–	–	—N/a	–	1.25	13.31
October 2020 (10)	38.56	24.04	10.74	9.78	11.31	0.87	1.98	1.26	0.45	0.40	—N/a	–	–	–	—N/a	–	1.98	14.52
September 2020 (9)	38.63	24.17	10.82	9.26	11.41	1.13	2.20	1.53	–	–	—N/a	–	–	–	—N/a	–	1.66	14.46
August 2020 (8)	38.91	25.19	9.96	10.40	10.09	1.13	2.11	1.49	0.60	0.40	—N/a	–	–	–	—N/a	–	1.19	13.72
July 2020 (7)	38.94	25.14	10.91	9.37	9.69	1.10	2.14	1.74	–	–	—N/a	–	–	–	—N/a	–	1.45	13.80
June 2020 (9)	37.01	25.42	11.31	9.82	9.70	1.27	2.88	2.08	–	–	—N/a	–	–	–	—N/a	–	1.04	11.59
May 2020 (10)	38.41	25.67	10.52	9.90	9.94	1.25	1.78	1.73	–	–	—N/a	–	–	–	—N/a	–	1.03	12.74
April 2020 (6)	39.13	24.78	11.23	10.17	10.02	0.88	1.67	1.32	–	–	—N/a	–	–	–	—N/a	–	1.35	14.35
March 2020 (5)	39.48	25.24	10.70	10.32	9.70	1.38	2.20	1.43	–	0.60	—N/a	–	–	–	—N/a	–	0.86	14.24
February 2020 (10)	37.69	25.79	11.02	10.08	10.18	1.33	1.13	1.40	–	1.10	—N/a	–	–	–	—N/a	–	2.87	11.90
January 2020 (9)	37.98	25.30	11.16	10.08	9.34	1.60	1.33	1.71	–	–	—N/a	–	–	–	—N/a	–	3.17	12.68
December 2019 (10)	39.14	26.12	10.74	10.95	8.83	1.13	1.10	1.23	0.50	0.40	—N/a	–	–	–	—N/a	–	2.46	13.02
November 2019 (7)	37.84	25.36	11.34	11.81	8.13	1.25	5.05	3.65	–	–	—N/a	–	–	–	—N/a	–	2.30	12.48
October 2019 (7)	39.70	24.74	11.24	9.87	8.81	1.45	2.40	3.90	–	–	—N/a	–	–	–	—N/a	–	3.69	14.96
September 2019 (5)	36.82	28.26	10.32	13.06	8.12	1.70	–	–	–	–	—N/a	–	–	–	—N/a	–	2.04	8.56
August 2019 (4)	36.90	24.93	11.73	10.10	9.25	0.90	4.40	4.20	–	–	—N/a	–	–	–	—N/a	–	4.73	11.97
July 2019 (1)	36.70	29.10	12.20	10.80	9.10	1.60	–	—N/a	–	–	—N/a	–	–	–	—N/a	–	0.50	7.60
May 2019 (1)	40.70	28.50	11.30	8.00	8.00	1.20	–	—N/a	–	–	—N/a	–	–	–	—N/a	–	2.30	12.20
April 2019 (1)	34.00	27.00	10.40	15.60	11.10	1.40	–	—N/a	–	–	—N/a	–	–	–	—N/a	–	0.40	7.00
March 2019 (1)	37.50	25.80	12.10	9.60	13.20	–	—N/a	—N/a	–	–	—N/a	–	–	–	—N/a	–	1.70	12.30
February 2019 (1)	37.10	25.20	12.20	11.60	12.30	–	—N/a	—N/a	–	–	—N/a	–	–	–	—N/a	–	1.70	11.90
January 2019 (3)	39.20	26.57	10.27	10.93	10.70	1.40	—N/a	—N/a	–	–	—N/a	–	–	–	—N/a	–	1.90	12.63
December 2018 (2)	42.15	26.80	9.20	9.40	9.95	1.40	—N/a	—N/a	–	–	—N/a	–	–	–	—N/a	–	1.80	15.35
November 2018 (2)	42.10	24.20	10.70	12.70	9.40	–	—N/a	—N/a	–	–	—N/a	–	–	–	—N/a	–	1.90	17.90
October 2018 (2)	38.95	25.95	10.30	12.95	9.85	1.45	—N/a	—N/a	–	—N/a	—N/a	–	–	–	—N/a	–	0.80	13.00
July 2018 (2)	45.10	23.80	9.90	11.60	7.95	1.10	—N/a	—N/a	–	—N/a	—N/a	–	–	–	—N/a	–	1.10	21.30
2018 election	42.56	22.65	11.70	11.10	9.96	1.34	N/A	N/A	N/A	N/A	N/A	N/A	N/A	N/A	N/A	N/A	0.69 (Note: Free Cause Party – 0.31, Patriotic Party – 0.23, independent – 0.15)	19.91

== Regional ==
=== Kurdish-majority provinces ===
Fieldwork date	Polling firm	Sample size									Others	Lead
Fieldwork date	Polling firm	Sample size	HDP	AKP	MHP	CHP	İYİ	SP	DEVA	GP	Others	Lead
26-30 August	Sosyo Politik	1,501 (Note: Conducted in the provinces of Adıyaman, Ağrı, Batman, Bingöl, Bitlis, Diyarbakır, Hakkari, Iğdır, Kars, Mardin, Muş, Siirt, Tunceli, Şanlıurfa, Şırnak and Van.)	48.6	20.1	3.2	15.0	5.4	0.8	3.7	1.5	1.7	28.5
27–30 Jun	Rawest	1,565 (Note: Conducted in the provinces of Diyarbakır, Van, Şanlıurfa and Mardin.)	51.3	23.8	1.9	9.8	2.1	1.0	4.7	2.6	2.9	27.5
4–8 Mar	Sosyo Politik	1,505	45.6	17.5	1.9	9.6	3.0	1.2	3.3	1.5	0.3	28.1
2022
4–9 Sep	Sosyo Politik	1,064	55.6	14.0	1.2	12.7	1.7	0.5	2.3	1.2	0.8	41.6
25–30 May	Sosyo Politik	1,064	52.5	27.5	3.2	7.8	3.6	0.5	3.2	0.5	1.2	25.0
18–25 Jan	Sosyo Politik	1,507 (Note: Conducted in the provinces of Diyarbakır, Van, Batman, Mardin, Şanlıurfa, Ağrı, Bitlis, Kars, Muş and Bingöl.)	54.5	24.3	3.1	7.8	2.0	0.7	4.5	0.9	2.2	30.2
2021
28–31 Dec	Rawest	1,497 (Note: Conducted in the provinces of Diyarbakır, Van, Şanlıurfa and Mardin.)	50.5	28.5	2.0	7.4	1.2	1.1	5.0	3.1	1.2	22.0
14–23 Aug	Sosyo Politik	918 (Note: Conducted in the provinces of Diyarbakır, Van, Batman, Hakkari, Mardin, Şırnak, Şanlıurfa, Ağrı, Bitlis, Iğdır, Kars, Muş and Siirt.)	71.9	10.7	1.7	5.2	–	1.3	3.0	5.0	1.3	61.2
2020
26–28 Sep	Sosyo Politik	1,450 (Note: Conducted in the provinces of Adıyaman, Ağrı, Bingöl, Diyarbakır, Mardin, Şanlıurfa and Van.)	56.8	31.1	1.4	7.1	0.5	0.5	0.5	1.1	1.0	25.7
2019
2018 parliamentary election		4,156,703 (Note: Results of Ağrı, Batman, Bingöl, Bitlis, Diyarbakır, Hakkari, Kars, Mardin, Muş, Siirt, Tunceli, Şanlıurfa and Van provinces.)	52.6	33.6	4.0	3.2	2.2	1.3	N/A	N/A	2.6	19.0

=== Bursa ===
Fieldwork date	Polling firm	Sample size						Others	Lead
Fieldwork date	Polling firm	Sample size	AKP	CHP	İYİ	HDP	MHP	Others	Lead
April	ORC	2,900	**40.1**	26.7	16.2	4.9	6.1	6.0	13.4
February	ORC	3,420	**37.0**	25.1	20.3	4.3	5.1	8.2	11.9
2023
March	TEAM	2,454	**36.8**	29.5	14.0	3,9	8,6	7.2	7.3
2022
2018 parliamentary election		2,147,723	46.2	22.7	12.4	5.7	10,7	2.3	23.5

=== Istanbul ===
Fieldwork date	Polling firm	Sample size						Others	Lead
Fieldwork date	Polling firm	Sample size	AKP	CHP	İYİ	HDP	MHP	Others	Lead
April	ORC	6,200	**35.9**	29.8	12.3	11.6	4.8	5.6	6.1
January	ORC		**30.8**	27.3	17.8	8.0	4.7	11.4	3.5
2023
13–17 April	ORC	7,100	**33.1**	27.8	17.5	10.7	4.9	5.0	5.3
29–31 January	AREA	1.524	**34.6**	31.7	11.6	10.8	5.8	4.2	2.9
January	TEAM	1,064	35.4	**36.2**	8.5	9.9	5.8	4.2	0.8
2022
2018 parliamentary election		10,559,686	42.6	26.4	8.0	12.4	8.2	1.8	16.2

== Alliance vote ==
=== Government vs. Opposition ===
==== 2022 ====
Fieldwork date	Polling firm	Sample size				Lead
Fieldwork date	Polling firm	Sample size	AKP	Opposition	HDP + Others	Lead
**13 February 2022**	**The leaders of CHP, İYİ, SP, DEVA, GP and DP meet to announce an opposition alliance for the election.**					
24–31 Jan	Avrasya	1,860	34.87	**49.94**	14.06+1.13	15.07

==== 2021 ====
Fieldwork date	Polling firm	Sample size				Lead
Fieldwork date	Polling firm	Sample size	People's	Nation	HDP + Others	Lead
24–27 Dec	ORC	3,675	39.4	**40.6**	20.0	1.2
23–27 Dec	Avrasya	2,460	35.8	**40.6**	23.6	4.8
1–4 Dec	Yöneylem	2,002	29.5	**36.2**	11.7	6.7
12–18 Nov	MAK	5.750	38.0	**48.0**	14.0	10.0
30 Aug	Avrasya	2460	35.4	**43.1**	21.5	7.7
Aug	Yöneylem	3,040	34.7	**36.7**	16.1	2.0
Aug	Avrasya	–	37.9	**44.2**	17.9	6.3
26–30 Jul	Yöneylem	3,040	41.2	**42.2**	16.7	1.0
21–28 Jun	Sosyo Politik	1,008	33.7	**34.6**	–	0.9
8–11 Jun	Remres	2,853	**43.8**	41.4	14.8	2.4
21–25 May	Yöneylem	3,140	**43.0**	42.1	14.9	0.9
24–26 May	MetroPOLL	1,719	40.1	**48.0**	–	7.9
16–21 Apr	MetroPOLL	1,752	42.8	**46.1**	–	3.3
22–25 Mar	MetroPOLL	1,637	**46.4**	43.5	–	2.9
Mar	SAROS	3,042	**48.0**	32.6	13.0+6.3	15.4
Jan	SAROS	3,034	**47.8**	30.3	12.8+9.0	17.5
17–21 Jan	MetroPOLL	1,575	39.6	**48.3**	–	8.7
2018 parliamentary election		51.183.729	53.7	33.9	11.7+0.7	19.8

==== 2020 ====
Fieldwork date	Polling firm	Sample size				Lead
Fieldwork date	Polling firm	Sample size	People's	Nation	HDP + Others	Lead
21 Nov–9 Dec	Konsensus	1,500	**51.4**	34.2	12.1+2.3	17.2
19–24 Oct	Avrasya	2,460	**41.7**	41.2	11.6+5.5	0.5
Sep	MAK	N/A	44.2	**47.4**	–	3.2
21–25 Sep	Avrasya	2,460	**45.8**	39.4	10.7+4.1	6.4
20–23 May	Avrasya	2,460	**42.7**	40.7	10.9+5.7	2.0
31 Jan–3 Feb	Areda Survey	2,987	**51.1**	48.9	–	2.2
2018 parliamentary election		51.183.729	53.7	33.9	11.7+0.7	19.8

==== 2019 ====
Fieldwork date	Polling firm	Sample size				Lead
Fieldwork date	Polling firm	Sample size	People's	Nation	HDP + Others	Lead
Nov	Areda Survey	N/A	**52.9**	47.1	–	5.8
Oct	Areda Survey	N/A	**51.2**	48.8	–	2.4
2018 parliamentary election		51.183.729	53.7	33.9	11.7+0.7	19.8
