= Movement for Change (disambiguation) =

Movement for Change is a political party in Iraq.

Movement for Change or Movement for Changes may also refer to:

- Movement for Changes, a political party in Montenegro
- Party for Change in Turkey, originally known as the Movement for Change in Turkey (Turkish: Türkiye Değişim Hareketi), a political movement in Turkey
- Movement for Change and Prosperity, a political party in Montserrat
- Movement for Change, an activist organisation connected to the British Labour Party
- PASOK – Movement for Change, a political party in Greece
