= Mustafa Sarıgül =

Turkish politician

Mustafa Sarıgül MP
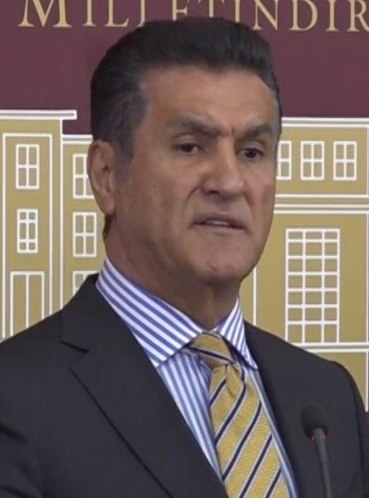
- Sarıgül in 2023

Member of the Grand National Assembly
- Incumbent
- Assumed office 2 June 2023
- Constituency: Erzincan (2023)
- In office 14 December 1987 – 4 November 1991
- Constituency: İstanbul (1987)

Leader of the Party for Change in Turkey
- In office 17 December 2020 – 23 June 2023

Mayor of Şişli
- In office 18 April 1999 – 3 April 2014
- Preceded by: Cüneyt Akgün
- Succeeded by: Hayri İnönü

Personal details
- Born: 15 November 1956 (age 69) İliç, Erzincan Province, Turkey
- Party: Social Democratic Populist Party (1987-1991); Democratic Left Party (1991-2002, 2005-2010, 2019-2020); New Turkey Party (2002-2003); Republican People's Party (2003-2005, 2013-2019, 2023-2026); Party for Change in Turkey (2020-2023); Independent (2010-2013, 2026-present); New Party (2026)
- Spouses: Gülsüm Köksaloğlu (m. 1976; died 1985) Aylin Kotil (m. 1993; div. 2008)
- Children: 2

Mustafa Sarıgül (born 15 November 1956) is a Turkish writer, entrepreneur and politician who is currently a member of the Grand National Assembly from Erzincan.

He was the mayor of the Şişli district in Istanbul between 1999 and 2014 as a member of the Republican People's Party (CHP). He is recently embroiled in a legal battle with the current mayor of Şişli who accused Sarıgül for threatening the life of his family. He was the leader of Party for Change in Turkey from 2020 to 2023, when the party was absorbed into the CHP.

== Biography ==
Mustafa Sarıgül was born in Erzincan, where he grew up and went to school. As a young boy he herded sheep. In 1962 his family moved to Istanbul, where he saw his father, who worked as a bouncer and warehouse worker, for the first time. He studied at Marmara University professorship. He started his professional career directing İstanbul Elektrik Tramvay ve Tünel, a publicly owned local transport company.

=== Political career ===
In the parliamentary elections in 1987, he was elected as a member of the Social Democratic Populist Party (Turkish: Sosyaldemokrat Halkçı Parti, SHP) with a record vote in the city of Istanbul as the youngest Member of Parliament of Turkey.

Between 1999 and 2002 Sarıgül was a member of the Democratic Left Party (Turkish: Demokratik Sol Parti, DSP) under Prime Minister Bülent Ecevit. On 19 April 1999, he was overwhelmingly elected mayor of Şişli, as the successor of Cuneyt Akgun. In 2002, he joined the Yeni Türkiye Partisi (New Turkey Party) of Foreign Minister İsmail Cem İpekçi, before he became a member of the Republican People's Party (Turkish: Cumhuriyet Halk Partisi, CHP) in 2003. Within the CHP Sarıgül was an internal party rival of chairman Deniz Baykal. Due to that background he later was expelled from the party in 2005. He was involved in a fistfight with some of the delegates during the 2005 General Assembly of CHP that tarnished his potentials to get involved with national politics of Turkey. After a period as an independent, he announced in 2008 to become again a member of the Democratic Left Party.

He unsuccessfully ran for mayor of the metropolitan municipality of Istanbul from the Republican People's Party in the local elections of 2014.

In the local elections of 2019 Sarıgül ran for mayor of Şişli for the DSP and reached the 2nd place.

On 21 December 2020 he founded Party for Change in Turkey. He was elected MP from Erzincan from CHP's lists in the 2023 Parliamentary election, becoming the first MP elected under CHP's banner there since 36 years ago. The Party of Change in Turkey merged with the CHP on 23 June 2023.

=== Corruption allegations ===
Sarıgül was elected into the Turkish Parliament in 1987 as the youngest MP and as member of SHP. Another MP from SHP, Tevfik Koçak, made a request to investigate corruption and bribery charges related to the procurement of military aircraft. Claims are made later by Tevfik Koçak, that Sarıgül made another request to the parliament falsifying Koçak's signature to withdraw the claim about the corruption charges. Sarıgül was dismissed from SHP in 1992.

Cumhuriyet Halk Partisi prepared a report in 2005 with details of bribery and corruption claims in the Şişli municipality. He was dismissed from the CHP in 2005.

Can Ataklı, a columnist applying to CHP, running for mayorship in İstanbul in 2013, questioned Sarıgül's connections with Soros and Gulen Movement, requesting Sarıgül to publicize the financial support he receives from businessmen.

== Personal life ==
Mustafa Sarıgül first wife Gülsüm Köksaloğlu died early. He has divorced from his second wife Aylin Kotil in 2008 and has two children.

== Publications ==
Mustafa Sarıgül is author of two books;

- TBMM'de Bir Milletvekili
- İstanbul'da Direksiyon Sallamak
