= Party for Change in Turkey =

Party for Change in Turkey Türkiye Değişim Partisi
- Leader: Mustafa Sarıgül
- General Secretary: Soner Gökçe
- Founded: 17 December 2020
- Dissolved: 23 June 2023
- Split from: DSP; CHP
- Preceded by: TDH
- Merged into: CHP
- Succeeded by: New Party
- Headquarters: Çankaya, Ankara
- Youth wing: Youth of Change
- Ideology: Kemalism; Social democracy; Social liberalism; Pro-Europeanism; Parliamentarism; Economic nationalism
- Political position: Center
- Colours: Red and White
- Slogan: Change takes heart! Değişim yürek ister!

The Party for Change in Turkey, or TDP (Turkish: Türkiye Değişim Partisi), was a Turkish political movement originally started and founded in 2009, transforming into a political party in 2020 under the leadership of Mustafa Sarıgül.

After a period in the DSP, Sarıgül established the TDH (Türkiye Değişim Hareketi/Movement for Change in Turkey) to challenge the domination of the Turkish centre-left by the CHP, whose leader Deniz Baykal had withstood a leadership challenge by Sarıgül in 2005.

Party leader Sarıgül announced that they would support the CHP and Kılıçdaroğlu in the 2023 general elections. In response, the CHP made Sarıgül a candidate for the parliament from the Erzincan electoral district. Party leader Mustafa Sarıgül announced that they were merging with the CHP on 8 June 2023.

== Flag and symbol ==
The party symbol and flag represents the Thrace with the heart in the west, and Anatolia with the heart in the east, both unified with the star (representing the one in the Turkish flag) in the middle, possibly also representing a comet star as there is a trail behind the star. The trail also represents the Turkish crescent, as it is shaped in such a way. The red and white represent the heart theme, peace, and Turkishness. The symbol and flag mainly represent unification of all people and ideas in a peaceful way inside Turkey.

== Background ==
In the 2010s, the movement described itself as social democratic and lists among its policy goals reducing Turkey's rich-poor gap, promoting pluralism, and empowering the women and youth. The movement also emphasized democratizing the country's political system and moving forward reforms to bring the country in line with EU norms.

After transforming into a political party, it kept the same pro-Western vision, but in a more neutral way.

The TDH attracted some support amongst CHP veterans like Hikmet Çetin and Onur Kumbaracıbaşı, both former deputy prime ministers, alongside former ambassador Faruk Loğoğlu. It reportedly, by party & movement claims had as many as 670,000 volunteers back when it was just a political movement. Journalists speculated that the TDH could have mobilized female and younger voters, reconnect with the CHP's erstwhile supporters in the Alevi and Kurdish communities by toning down the CHP's strident secularism and nationalism, cut into the base of the ruling conservative AK Party.

However, in the 2020s the party seems to only attract much younger voters, unlike other new known minor parties like the Victory (Zafer) and Homeland (Memleket) parties, which have had an easier time cutting into diverse voter bases of the AKP, MHP and CHP by touching on issues that are not discussed or brought out by them. All actively criticize the government and do not support it, though the main-opposition is specially criticized specifically for lacking proper political strength against the AKP, stability within, and detaching from its Kemalist roots.

=== Early years of the first organized TDH side-movement and later on ===
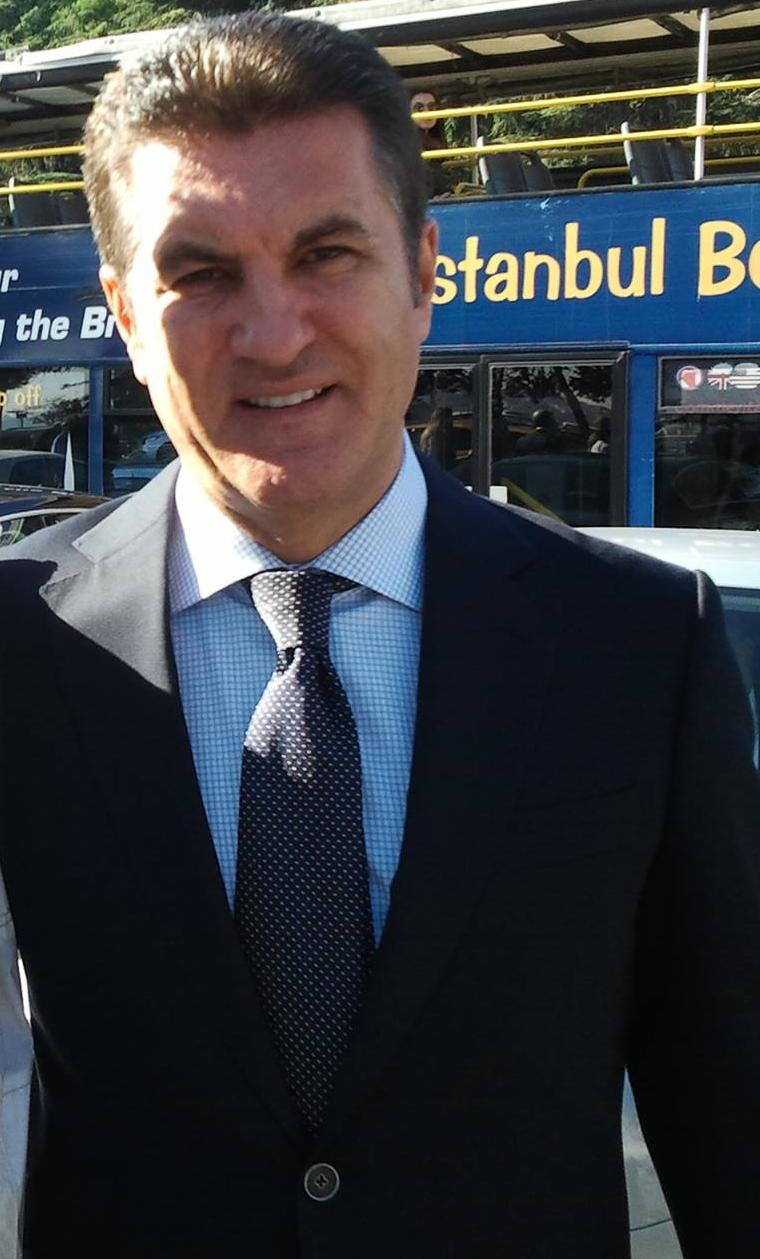
Sarıgül in 2013.

In May 2010, rivalry between the CHP and TDH intensified as the CHP's Önder Sav accused Sarıgül of involvement in the publication of the video on YouTube that prompted Deniz Baykal's resignation as CHP leader, and also accused him of paying a hitman to try to kill Baykal. Sarıgül denied both allegations and has promised to seek legal redress against Sav.

Following Kemal Kılıçdaroğlu's succession to CHP's leadership in 2010, Sarıgül announced that this created an opportunity for change in the CHP, and that he would not form a new party. The announcement took other leaders of the TDH by surprise.

After his loss in 2014 Turkish local elections as the CHP candidate for Istanbul, Sarıgül returned to the DSP (Demokratik Sol Parti) platform and participated in the 2019 Turkish local elections in Şişli, where he lost to CHP's candidate with a little margin.

In December 2020, Sarıgül decided to transform the TDH into a party, naming it the Türkiye Değişim Partisi (TDP), which is the 'Party of Change in Turkey' in its current form.

TDP competed in the 2023 Turkish parliamentary election on CHP's lists, with Sarıgül as its first placed candidate on its Erzincan list. Sarıgül also endorsed Kılıçdaroğlu in the presidential election. Sarıgül won his seat, being the first MP elected from CHP's lists from Erzincan in 36 years. In June 2023, the party was dissolved and rejoined CHP.

== Election results ==
Year	Leader	Seats	+/-	Position
2023	Mustafa Sarıgül	1 / 600	▲1	Opposition

== See also ==
- Homeland Party
- Victory Party
