= 2023 Turkish presidential election candidate nominations =

In the lead up to the 2023 Turkish presidential election, discussions took place around the nomination of presidential candidates.

Recep Tayyip Erdoğan, the incumbent president and leader of the Justice and Development Party (AKP), announced that he would run as the presidential candidate of the electoral alliance, the People's Alliance. Other parties of the People's Alliance, the Nationalist Movement Party (MHP) and the Great Unity Party (BBP), supported Erdoğan's candidacy. This was Erdoğan's third presidential campaign, following two prior successful campaigns in 2014 and 2018.

Kemal Kılıçdaroğlu, leader of the Republican People's Party and the Main Opposition Leader since 2010, was the joint candidate of the Nation Alliance. The Nation Alliance was a newly created electoral alliance of opposition parties consisting of the Table of Six: the Republican People's Party, the Good Party, the Democrat Party, the Felicity Party, DEVA Party and the Future Party. The Alliance held its nomination meeting on 2 March 2023, with an official announcement confirming Kılıçdaroğlu as its joint candidate occurring on 6 March 2023.

Muharrem İnce, who was the presidential candidate of the Republican People's Party in the 2018 election and finished second with 30.6% of the vote, announced that he would be a candidate again as the leader of the Homeland Party. İnce withdrew from the race three days before the election even after gaining ballot access. Sinan Oğan was nominated by the right-wing Ancestral Alliance and also achieved ballot access.

Four candidates, Erdoğan, Kılıçdaroğlu, İnce, and Oğan appeared on the ballot in the first round. After no candidate received a majority of the vote in the first round, the top two candidates, Erdoğan and Kılıçdaroğlu, were the only eligible candidates to appear on the ballot for the second round. Third and fourth place candidates Oğan and İnce endorsed Erdoğan and Kılıçdaroğlu respectively.

== Official candidates ==
List of presidential candidates in the order they appeared on ballots in the first round (Note: Note that alliances and parties do not appear on the official ballot paper.)
1				2	3						4			
Recep Tayyip Erdoğan				Muharrem İnce (Note: İnce withdrew his candidacy on 11 May 2023, but remained on the ballot.)	Kemal Kılıçdaroğlu						Sinan Oğan			
People's Alliance				—N/a	Nation Alliance						Ancestral Alliance			
AKP	MHP	BBP	YRP	MP	CHP	İYİ	DEVA	GP	SP	DP	ZP	AP	ÜP	TÜİP
Campaign				Campaign	Campaign						Campaign			

== Nomination process ==
=== People's Alliance ===
Possible People's Alliance candidates
Recep Tayyip Erdoğan	Devlet Bahçeli	Süleyman Soylu	Hulusi Akar
Current President and AK Party leader	Nationalist Movement Party leader	Current Minister of the Interior	Current Minister of National Defense
People's Alliance candidate	Rejected by himself	Speculated	Speculated

On 9 June 2022, Recep Tayyip Erdoğan, the leader of the Justice and Development Party and the incumbent president since 2014, announced that he would be a candidate in the 2023 presidential election. Erdogan's candidacy was supported by the other member parties of the People's Alliance, the Nationalist Movement Party (MHP) and the Great Unity Party (BBP). MHP leader Devlet Bahçeli stated more than once that the candidate for the People's Alliance would be Erdoğan. Some lawyers and opposition politicians stated that since Erdoğan was elected president twice in the 2014 and 2018 elections, he could not be a candidate again unless the parliament decided to hold early elections, according to the law. Mustafa Şentop, Ersan Şen, Metin Feyzioğlu and other lawyers said that the 2018 election was Erdoğan's first term, arguing that a new office was formed, apart from the name similarity, as the presidential system was adopted in 2018 following a constitutional referendum. According to Freedom House, Erdoğan has the right to run again in the new system in 2023, as his first term ended early. Stating that Erdoğan cannot be a candidate, the lawyers oppose this view by stating that the maximum term of office in the constitution has not been changed and in this case, the constitution should be taken as the basis, not the systems.

There was speculation that if Erdoğan was not the candidate, possible alternatives would have been Minister of Interior Süleyman Soylu or Minister of National Defense Hulusi Akar.

=== Nation Alliance and Table of Six ===
Possible Republican People's Party candidates
Kemal Kılıçdaroğlu	Ekrem İmamoğlu	Mansur Yavaş	Lütfü Savaş	İlhan Kesici	Tanju Özcan
Republican People's Party leader	Istanbul mayor	Ankara mayor	Hatay mayor	Republican People's Party deputy	Bolu mayor
Nation Alliance candidate	Rejected by himself	Rejected by himself	Declared his interest	Speculated	Declared his interest

Other possible Table of Six candidates
Meral Akşener	Ali Babacan	Ahmet Davutoğlu	Temel Karamollaoğlu	Gültekin Uysal	Abdullah Gül	Haşim Kılıç	Muhtar Kent	Özgür Demirtaş
Good Party leader	DEVA Party leader	Future Party leader and former Prime minister	Felicity Party leader	Democrat Party leader	Former President of Turkey	Former Constitutional Court President	Business executive	Academician
Rejected by herself	Speculated	Speculated	Speculated	Speculated	Speculated	Speculated	Speculated	Speculated

The Nation Alliance was founded by the opposition parties which made up the Table of Six: the Republican People's Party, the Good Party, the Democrat Party, the Felicity Party, DEVA Party and the Future Party. It was agreed that six political parties would not nominate more than one candidate and would agree on a common candidate in order to "not give the appearance of discrimination and competition". At the meeting of Table of Six on 25 January 2023, it was discussed for the first time how the presidential candidate will be determined. The Table of Six was expected to decide on a joint candidate at a meeting held on 13 February. However, the meeting was postponed to 2 March due to the 2023 Turkey–Syria earthquake.

==== Kemal Kılıçdaroğlu ====
There was a high degree of media speculation concerning possible candidates within the current main opposition party, the Republican People's Party, that could possibly run as its candidate for president. Party leader Kemal Kılıçdaroğlu's candidacy was supported by CHP deputies and mayors such as parliamentary CHP group Deputy Chairman Özgür Özel, Deputy Chairman Veli Ağbaba, and mayor of Antalya Muhittin Böcek. Despite this, according to opinion polls taken before any official candidate was declared, Kılıçdaroğlu was one of the least likely to win against Erdoğan among the possible CHP candidates.

The Table of Six met on 2 March 2023 to determine the candidate. Although the name of the candidate was determined that day, the name of the candidate would be announced later. At the meeting, it was claimed that all parties, except the Good Party, approved Kemal Kılıçdaroğlu's candidacy. His candidacy was officially announced on 6 March 2023.

==== Ekrem İmamoğlu and Mansur Yavaş ====
In the 2019 local elections and the repeat Istanbul mayoral election, the presidential candidacy debates continued about Ekrem İmamoğlu, who won against the AK Party candidate Binali Yıldırım twice and won the Istanbul mayorship that the AK Party held since 2004. İmamoğlu was considered to be one of the strongest candidates if he chose to run against Erdoğan in 2023. In his own statement, he said "I do not have an agenda regarding the presidency" and stated that the process will be determined by the Table of Six.

Ankara Mayor Mansur Yavaş, who won against the ruling party's candidate in the 2019 Ankara mayoral election, was also among the possible candidates. Yavaş, like Ekrem İmamoğlu, was considered a strong candidate who could win against Erdoğan. He was similarly ahead of Erdogan in most of the presidential election polls. On 6 December 2022, Yavaş answered a question regarding his potential candidacy saying, "We will obey whatever the Table of Six says."

Victory Party Chairman Ümit Özdağ requested Mansur Yavaş to be nominated. Özdağ later stated that if the Table of Six did not nominate Yavaş, they would propose a candidacy to Yavaş. Peoples' Democratic Party parliamentary group Deputy Chairman Meral Danış Beştaş said that they were against Mansur Yavaş's candidacy.

==== Reaction by the Good Party ====
Although a member of the Nation Alliance, many members of the Good Party were noted as opposing a potential Kılıçdaroğlu candidacy throughout the electoral alliance's consideration of candidates. Orhun Erktürkmen, who is responsible for the youth policies of the Good Party, came out in support of the candidacies of İmamoğlu and Yavaş.

On 2 March 2023, when the Table of Six met and decided to endorse Kemal Kılıçdaroğlu's presidential candidacy, some Good Party members made online posts to indicate that the party was against Kılıçdaroğlu's candidacy. On 3 March 2023, the Good Party officially decided to leave the Table of Six because it did not support Kılıçdaroğlu as the joint candidate. On the same day, Meral Akşener called for Ekrem İmamoğlu and Mansur Yavaş to be candidates in her statement. After this call, 5 CHP mayors, including Ekrem İmamoğlu and Mansur Yavaş, met with Kemal Kılıçdaroğlu. After the meeting, Akşener's call was rejected by İmamoğlu and Yavaş. Three days later, the Good Party rejoined the Table of Six after its meetings with the CHP.

==== Other CHP members ====
Hatay mayor Lütfü Savaş and Bolu mayor Tanju Özcan announced that they would accept the presidential candidacy proposal.

Area Research head Murat Karan claimed that if Kılıçdaroğlu did not run, Table of Six would nominate İlhan Kesici.

==== Other Table of Six members ====
Good Party leader Meral Akşener announced that she will not be a presidential candidate and that she will be a prime minister candidate if the strengthened parliamentary system supported by the main opposition is passed. Democracy and Progress Party leader Ali Babacan said he would accept it if he was nominated as a presidential candidate.

On 11 March 2022, Kemal Kılıçdaroğlu said that one of the leaders in the Table of Six could be a candidate. On 6 September 2022, Kemal Kılıçdaroğlu made the statement that "Everyone has the right to be a candidate" for the candidacy of former president Abdullah Gül. Abdullah Gül was also mentioned in the candidacy talks of the opposition in the 2018 Turkish presidential election.

Journalist Nihat Genç claimed that the opposition's candidate would be former Constitutional Court Haşim Kılıç. Good Party Secretary Uğur Poyraz and CHP deputy Gürsel Tekin denied this claim. Tekin said that the candidate would be from the CHP. Journalist Emin Çapa said in a statement on Halk TV that the candidate must be clear and has no ties to politics. Upon this statement, it was claimed that Muhtar Kent or Özgür Demirtaş would be candidates. These allegations were denied by the CHP and it was stated that neither of the two names would be candidates and that they did not have such a potential.

=== Labour and Freedom Alliance ===
Possible Labour and Freedom Alliance candidates
Selahattin Demirtaş	Gültan Kışanak	Rıza Türmen	Ahmet Türk	Şebnem Korur Fincancı
Former Peoples' Democratic Party co-chair and political prisoner	Former Peace and Democracy Party co-chair	Former European Court of Human Rights judge	Former Democratic Society Party leader	President of the Turkish Medical Association
Speculated	Speculated	Speculated	Speculated	Speculated

No candidate was put forth by the Labour and Freedom Alliance. Prior to its announcement on 22 March 2023, it was speculated that if the Nation Alliance nominated Kılıçdaroğlu, the alliance would not nominate a candidate. After Kılıçdaroğlu was announced as the Nation's Alliance joint candidate, the Labour and Freedom Alliance chose to not nominate a candidate, which was seen as a strategic move to limit vote splitting against President Erdoğan. The alliance later endorsed Kılıçdaroğlu's candidacy on 27 April.

=== Other parties ===
Other possible candidates
Sinan Oğan	Muharrem İnce	Doğu Perinçek	Fatih Erbakan	Mustafa Sarıgül	Cem Uzan	Serdar Savaş
Independent	Homeland Party leader	Patriotic Party leader	New Welfare Party leader	Party for Change in Turkey leader	Former Young Party leader	Scientist
Ancestral Alliance candidate	Homeland Party candidate	Declared his candidacy	Declared and withdrew	Speculated	Declared his candidacy	Declared his candidacy

Sinan Oğan was nominated by the Ancestral Alliance, a right-wing electoral alliance formed to contest the 2023 elections headed by the Victory Party and Justice Party. Oğan, a former member of the Nationalist Movement Party before becoming an independent, was announced as the alliance's joint presidential candidate on 11 March 2023.

Muharrem İnce served as the presidential candidate for the Homeland Party, of which he was the leader and founder. The Homeland Party split from the Republican People's Party in 2020, after İnce served as the party's presidential candidate in his failed 2018 campaign against President Erdoğan. Initially he considered joining the Nation Alliance as well as the Ancestral Alliance, but announced on 6 March 2023 he was leaving the alliance and soon after announced his own candidacy. This was considered mainly as a result of the choosing of as its joint presidential candidate, after earlier comments made by İnce stating that he wouldn't have considered supporting him under normal conditions. After qualifying for the ballot, three days before the election İnce withdrew himself from the race. His name still appeared on the ballot.

Doğu Perinçek, the leader of the Patriotic Party and a candidate in the 2018 election, announced that he would be a candidate again. Fatih Erbakan announced his candidacy but later withdrew from the race and endorsed Erdogan. Former Young Party leader Cem Uzan and doctor Serdar Savaş are among those who also announced their candidacy. Mustafa Sarıgül, the leader of the Party for Change in Turkey, released a statement on his potential candidacy in January 2021, saying that his party would discuss the candidacy and make a decision. After the Nation Alliance's candidate was determined as Kemal Kılıçdaroğlu on 6 March 2023, Sarıgül supported Kılıçdaroğlu's candidacy by saying, "The most suitable candidate for this transition period is Kemal Kılıçdaroğlu at that table."

==== Nominations ====
According to article 101 of the Constitution of Turkey, amended following the 2017 constitutional referendum, any political party that has won 5% of the vote in the previous parliamentary election can put forward a candidate. The remaining candidates were required to collect at least 100,000 signatures.

Voters were able to give signatures to their preferred presidential candidate between 22 and 27 March at their local electoral council branch.

On 24 March, the New Welfare Party decided to join the People's Alliance. After this decision, Fatih Erbakan announced that he had ended the candidacy process in favour of Erdoğan.

Party	Candidate	Daily signatures						Result
Party	Candidate	22 March	23 March	24 March	25 March	26 March	27 March	Result
Homeland Party	Muharrem İnce	28,235	51,367	76,901	✓ 104,357	109,745	114,657	✓ Nominated
—N/a	Sinan Oğan	15,573	25,924	39,317	63,027	✓ 102,667	111,502	✓ Nominated
New Welfare Party	Fatih Erbakan (Note: Ended his candidacy process on 24 March.)	27,910	46,725	69,079	69,159	69,200	69,255	✗ Not nominated
Patriotic Party	Doğu Perinçek	6,679	11,792	16,192	20,400	23,776	27,055	✗ Not nominated
—N/a	Yakup Türkal	993	1,645	2,031	2,462	2,780	3,137	✗ Not nominated
—N/a	Erkan Trükten	397	755	1,116	1,604	1,940	2,588	✗ Not nominated
—N/a	Ahmet Özal	237	567	807	1,025	1,311	1,544	✗ Not nominated
Justice Unity Party	İrfan Uzun	176	319	447	698	1,001	1,263	✗ Not nominated
—N/a	Halil Murat Ünver	119	211	285	369	444	538	✗ Not nominated
—N/a	Hilmi Özden	60	151	225	333	405	478	✗ Not nominated
—N/a	Davut Turan	34	68	92	106	111	122	✗ Not nominated
Totals		80,413	139,524	206,494	263,540	313,380	332,139	
