= Konya (electoral district) =

Electoral district for the Grand National Assembly of Turkey

Coordinates: 38°10′N 32°30′E

- electoral district for the Grand National Assembly of Turkey
- Konya shown within Turkey
- Province: Konya
- Electorate: 1.630.438

Current electoral district
- Created: 1920
- Seats: 15 Historical: 15 (2018-present) 14 (2011-2018) 16 (1995-2011) 13 (1991-1995) 14 (1987-1991) 13 (1983-1987) 16 (1961-1983) 21 (1957-1961) 19 (1954-1957)
- MPs: List: Tahir Akyurek AK Party Orhan Erdem AK Party Selman Özboyacı AK Party Meryem Göka AK Party Abdullah Ağralı AK Party Mehmet Baykan AK Party Ziya Altunyaldız AK Party Latif Selvi AK Party Mustafa Hakan Özer AK Party Mustafa Kalaycı MHP Konur Alp Koçak MHP Barış Bektaş CHP Hasan Ekici CHP Ünal Karaman İYİ Ali Yüksel YRP
- Turnout at last election: 89.17%
- Representation
- AK Party: 9 / 15
- MHP: 2 / 15
- CHP: 2 / 15
- İYİ: 1 / 15
- YRP: 1 / 15

Konya is an electoral district of the Grand National Assembly of Turkey. It elects fourteen members of parliament (deputies) to represent the province of the same name for a four-year term by the D'Hondt method, a party-list proportional representation system.

== Members ==
Population reviews of each electoral district are conducted before each general election, which can lead to certain districts being granted a smaller or greater number of parliamentary seats. Konya's seat number is 15 since 2018.

MPs for Konya, 2002 onwards
Seat	2002 (22nd parliament)	2007 (23rd parliament)	2011 (24th parliament)	June 2015 (25th parliament)	November 2015 (26th parliament)	2018 (27th parliament)	2023 (28th parliament)
1	Abdullah Çetinkaya; AK Party		Ahmet Davutoğlu; AK Party			Ahmet Sorgun; AK Party	Mehmet Baykan; AK Party
2	Harun Tüfekci; AK Party			Halil Etyemez; AK Party			Meryem Göka; AK Party
3	Remzi Çetin; AK Party	Ayşe Türkmenoğlu; AK Party		Abdullah Ağralı; AK Party			
4	Ahmet Işık; AK Party	Mustafa Kabakcı; AK Party		Mehmet Babaoğlu; AK Party		Tahir Akyürek; AK Party	
5	Ahmet Büyükakkaşlar; AK Party		Kerim Özkul; AK Party	Leyla Şahin Usta; AK Party			Latif Selvi; AK Party
6	Hasan Angı; AK Party		İlhan Yerlikaya; AK Party	Muhammet Uğur Kaleli; AK Party		Selman Özboyacı; AK Party	
7	Kerim Özkul; AK Party		Cem Zorlu; AK Party	Ziya Altunyaldız; AK Party			
8	Özkan Öksüz; AK Party		Hüseyin Üzülmez; AK Party	Hüsnüye Erdoğan; AK Party		Gülay Samancı; AK Party	Mustafa Hakan Özer; AK Party
9	Orhan Erdem; AK Party		Mustafa Baloğlu; AK Party			Orhan Erdem; AK Party	
10	Sami Güçlü; AK Party		Mustafa Akış; AK Party	Hacı Ahmet Özdemir; AK Party			Ali Yüksel; YRP
11	Muharrem Candan; AK Party		Gülay Samancı; AK Party	Rüveyde Gülseren Işık; AK Party		Fahrettin Yokuş; İYİ	Ünal Karaman; İYİ
12	Mehmet Kılıç; AK Party	Faruk Bal; MHP		Mustafa Sait Gönen; MHP	Ömer Ünal; AK Party	Esin Kara; MHP	
13	Mustafa Ünaldı; AK Party	Mustafa Kalaycı; MHP					
14	Atilla Kart; CHP			Mustafa Hüsnü Bozkurt; CHP		Abdüllatif Şener; CHP	Barış Bektaş; CHP
15	Nezir Büyükcengiz; CHP	Hüsnü Tuna; AK Party	No seat			Abdülkadir Karaduman; CHP	Hasan Ekici; CHP
16	Halil Ürün; AK Party	Ali Öztürk; AK Party	No seat				

== General elections ==
=== 2011 ===
Party	Votes	%	Seats	+/–
Justice and Development Party	810,396	69.64	11	-2
Nationalist Movement Party	152,633	13.12	2	–
Republican People's Party	118,935	10.22	1	–
Felicity Party	25,328	2.18	–	–
Independents	15,604	1.34	–	–
Great Unity Party	14,747	1.27	–	–
People's Voice Party	13,231	1.14	–	–
Democrat Party	6,734	0.58	–	–
Democratic Left Party	1,970	0.17	–	–
Communist Party of Turkey	1,504	0.13	–	–
Nation Party	1,492	0.13	–	–
Nationalist and Conservative Party	1,155	0.10	–	–
Total	1,163,729	100.00	14	-2

=== 2015 June ===
Party	Votes	%	Seats	+/–
Justice and Development Party	812,578	65.09	11	-
Nationalist Movement Party	203,003	16.26	2	–
Republican People's Party	123,675	9.91	1	–
Peoples' Democratic Party	56,488	4.53	–	–
Felicity Party	36,818	2.95	–	–
Democratic Left Party	2,705	0.22	–	–
People's Liberation Party	2,185	0.18	–	–
Rights and Freedoms Party	2,182	0.17	–	–
Independent Turkey Party	1,976	0.16	–	–
Democrat Party	1,848	0.15	–	–
Patriotic Party	1,822	0.15	–	–
True Path Party	915	0.07	–	–
Nation Party	595	0.05	–	–
Centre Party	561	0.04	–	–
Anatolia Party	421	0.03	–	–
Independents	273	0.02	–	–
Communist Party	205	0.02	–	–
TURK Party	24	0.00	–	–
Rights and Justice Party	16	0.00	–	–
Liberal Democrat Party	12	0.00	–	–
YURT Party	5	0.00	–	–
Total	1,248,307	100.00	14	0

=== 2015 November ===
Party	Votes	%	Seats	+/–
Justice and Development Party	957,770	74.03	12	+1
Nationalist Movement Party	146,050	11.29	1	-1
Republican People's Party	121,209	9.37	1	–
Peoples' Democratic Party	40,094	3.10	–	–
Felicity Party	11,461	0.89	–	–
Great Unity Party	7,019	0.54	–	–
Rights and Freedoms Party	2,114	0.16	–	–
People's Liberation Party	2,019	0.16	–	–
Democrat Party	1,597	0.12	–	–
Patriotic Party	1,330	0.10	–	–
Independent Turkey Party	924	0.07	–	–
Communist Party	634	0.05	–	–
Nation Party	535	0.04	–	–
Democratic Left Party	513	0.04	–	–
Liberal Democrat Party	487	0.04	–	–
True Path Party	12	0.00	–	–
Total	1,293,768	100.00	14	0

=== 2018 ===
Party	Votes	%	Seats	+/–
Justice and Development Party	804,146	59.41	10	-2
Nationalist Movement Party	209,722	15.49	2	+1
Republican People's Party	130,962	9.68	2	+1
Good Party	121,356	8.97	1	+1
Peoples' Democratic Party	50,266	3.71	–	–
Felicity Party	31,614	2.34	–	–
Free Cause Party	2,838	0.21	–	–
Patriotic Party	2,105	0.16	–	–
Independents	596	0.04	–	–
Total	1,353,605	100.00	15	+1

=== 2023 ===
Party	Votes	%	Seats	+/–
Justice and Development Party	702,348	47.98	9	-1
Nationalist Movement Party	209,563	14.32	2	–
Republican People's Party	200,427	13.69	2	–
Good Party	126,898	8.67	1	–
New Welfare Party	74,198	5.07	1	+1
Victory Party	42,981	2.94	–	–
Greens and Left Future Party	41,036	2.80	–	–
Great Unity Party	29,325	2.00	–	–
Homeland Party	12,971	0.89	–	–
Workers' Party of Turkey	5,987	0.41	–	–
Justice Party	5,192	0.35	–	–
Independents	3,570	0.24	–	–
Motherland Party	2,535	0.17	–	–
Nation Party	1,654	0.11	–	–
Left Party	1,122	0.08	–	–
Rights and Freedoms Party	1,070	0.07	–	–
People's Liberation Party	952	0.07	–	–
Communist Party of Turkey	890	0.06	–	–
Power Union Party	702	0.05	–	–
Communist Movement of Turkey	291	0.02	–	–
Patriotic Party	86	0.01	–	–
Justice Union Party	65	0.00	–	–
Young Party	53	0.00	–	–
National Path Party	8	0.00	–	–
Innovation Party	4	0.00	–	–
Total	1,463,928	100.00	15	0

== Presidential elections ==
=== 2014 ===
Party	Candidate	Votes	%
AK Party	Recep Tayyip Erdoğan	827,025	74.62
Independent	Ekmeleddin İhsanoğlu	247,488	22.33
HDP	Selahattin Demirtaş	33,833	3.05
Total votes		1,108,346	100.00
Rejected ballots		29,912	2.63
Turnout		1,138,258	80.92
Recep Tayyip Erdoğan win			

=== 2018 ===
Party	Candidate	Votes	%
AK Party	Recep Tayyip Erdoğan	971,856	74.22
CHP	Muharrem İnce	179,032	13.67
İYİ	Meral Akşener	107,905	8.24
HDP	Selahattin Demirtaş	29,726	2.27
SAADET	Temel Karamollaoğlu	18,931	1.45
Patriotic	Doğu Perinçek	2,018	0.15
Total votes		1,309,468	100.00
Rejected ballots		32,081	2.39
Turnout		1,341,549	89.23
Recep Tayyip Erdoğan win			

=== 2023 ===
Candidate	Party	First round		Second round	
Candidate	Party	Votes	%	Votes	%
Recep Tayyip Erdoğan	People's Allience	983,270	68.94	1,008,416	72.99
Kemal Kılıçdaroğlu	Nation Allience	341,123	23.92	373,100	27.01
Sinan Oğan	ATA Allience	96,333	6.75		
Muharrem İnce	Homeland Party	5,544	0.39		
Total		1,426,270	100.00	1,381,516	100.00
Valid votes		1,426,270	98.10	1,381,516	98.43
Invalid/blank votes		27,561	1.90	22,102	1.57
Total votes		1,453,831	100.00	1,403,618	100.00
Registered voters/turnout		1,630,437	89.17	1,630,747	86.07
