= 2023 Recep Tayyip Erdoğan presidential campaign =

Presidential campaign

Recep Tayyip Erdoğan for President
- Campaign: 2023 Turkish presidential election
- Candidate: Recep Tayyip Erdoğan; Incumbent President of Turkey (2014–present); Prime Minister of Turkey (2003–2014); Mayor of Istanbul (1994–1998)
- Affiliation: Justice and Development Party and People's Alliance
- Status: Announcement: 9 June 2022; Official nominee: 22 March 2023; Election day: 14 May 2023; Projected Victory in run-off: 28 May 2023

Turkish president Recep Tayyip Erdoğan began his candidate for the Presidential elections 2023 in April 2022. Erdoğan was the candidate of the People's Alliance consisting of the Justice and Development Party (AK Party) and the Nationalist Movement Party (MHP). Erdogan and his rival Kemal Kılıçdaroğlu both failed to secure a majority in the first round on 14 May and the election went to a run-off for the first time in Turkish history. On 28 May Erdogan won the election securing 52.18 percent of the vote and claimed victory after 99.4% of the votes were counted in the second round as the Supreme Election Council declared Erdoğan as mathematically elected.

== Background ==
In Turkey Presidents are subject to a limit of two 5-year terms. Recep Tayyip Erdoğan supporters contend that the Turkish presidency has assumed a new role in the Constitutional Referendum of 2017, others recall article 101 of the Turkish constitution which limits the presidency to two terms. The same article would allow a third term if elections were held before the end of the second term. In February 2022 the Parliamentary Speaker of the Grand National Assembly of Turkey Mustafa Sentop claimed Erdoğan could run for a third presidency despite a two term limit to the presidency in the Turkish constitution. The same month Devlet Bahceli of the MHP called for necessary legal requirements to enable a third candidacy of Erdoğan, while Kemal Kılıçdaroğlu from the oppositional Republican People's Party (CHP) also agreed to Erdoğans candidacy. Eventually AK Party officials claimed that the presidential term before the Presidential Referendum in 2017 is not considered a valid term. In December 2022, Erdogan announced the term from 2023 onwards would be his last. After several parties had appealed to the Supreme Electoral Council (YSK) opposing Erdoğans candidacy, on 4 April 2023 the YSK reasoned Erdoğan could stand for the presidential elections in 2023 as in 2014 no parliamentary election was held together with the presidential elections, hence, 2023 was only the second dual elections for Erdoğan. On the 14 April 2023, Bianet reported that Turgut Kazan, a former President of the Istanbul Bar Association who opposed Erdoğans candidacy, appealed before the European Court of Human Rights alleging in that the Turkish Constitution in which only two presidential terms are foreseen counts for everyone also for the YSK. He will run against Kemal Kilicdaroglu from the Republican People's Party (CHP), Muharrem Ince of the Homeland Party and Sinan Oğan of the Ancestral Alliance (ATA).

== Announcement ==
On 9 June 2022, Recep Tayyip Erdoğan announced his candidacy during a speech in Izmir at the Aegean sea. In the same speech, ending speculations on the election date, he assured them that the elections would be in June 2023 and also demanded for the oppositional Nation Alliance to announce their candidate. Since early January 2023 it was speculated on eventual snap elections before June 2023. The AK Party mentioned the dates of the 16, 30 April and the 14 May. The "Table of Six" composed by six opposition parties announced that they would not agree to snap elections after the 6 April.

In January 2023, Erdogan mentioned the 14 May 2023 as the date of the elections, as on the 14 May 1950 Adnan Menderes became prime minister after a victorious in the first multiparty elections of Turkey.

== Campaign ==
Erdogan promised to lower the inflation to numbers of single digits and aimed for Mehmet Simsek, (a former Finance Minister) to craft a new economic policy. In foreign policy he aims for normalizing the ties with Egypt, Saudi Arabia and Israel in an attempt to forge an "Axis of Turkey".

On 25 April, during an interview with news reporters in a joint-live broadcast between Kanal 7 and Ülke TV, the livestream was suddenly cut. The cameras maintained their focus on journalist Hakan Öztürk and away from Erdoğan, followed by a pause to the livestream. After approximately fifteen minutes, the livestream was turned on again, with Erdoğan blaming the incident on a stomach bug. Several campaigns were canceled after the incident, and rumors about Erdoğan's health arose. On 29 April, the Erdoğan family attended the Istanbul Airshow, which brought rumors of heart attack to a closure.

Erdoğan's government holds a firm grip over the media in Turkey. Until 2 May 2023, his campaign was broadcast for about 32 hours over the state-run Radio and Television Corporation (TRT), as opposed to the 32 minutes that was given to the campaign of his main contender Kilicdaroglu.

Recep Tayyip Erdoğan's vote share in the second round of the May 28, 2023 presidential election, by district.

== See also ==
- 2014 Recep Tayyip Erdoğan presidential campaign
- 2018 Recep Tayyip Erdoğan presidential campaign
- Kemal Kılıçdaroğlu 2023 presidential campaign
- 2023 Sinan Oğan presidential campaign
