= 2023 Sinan Oğan presidential campaign =

Presidential campaign

Sinan Oğan
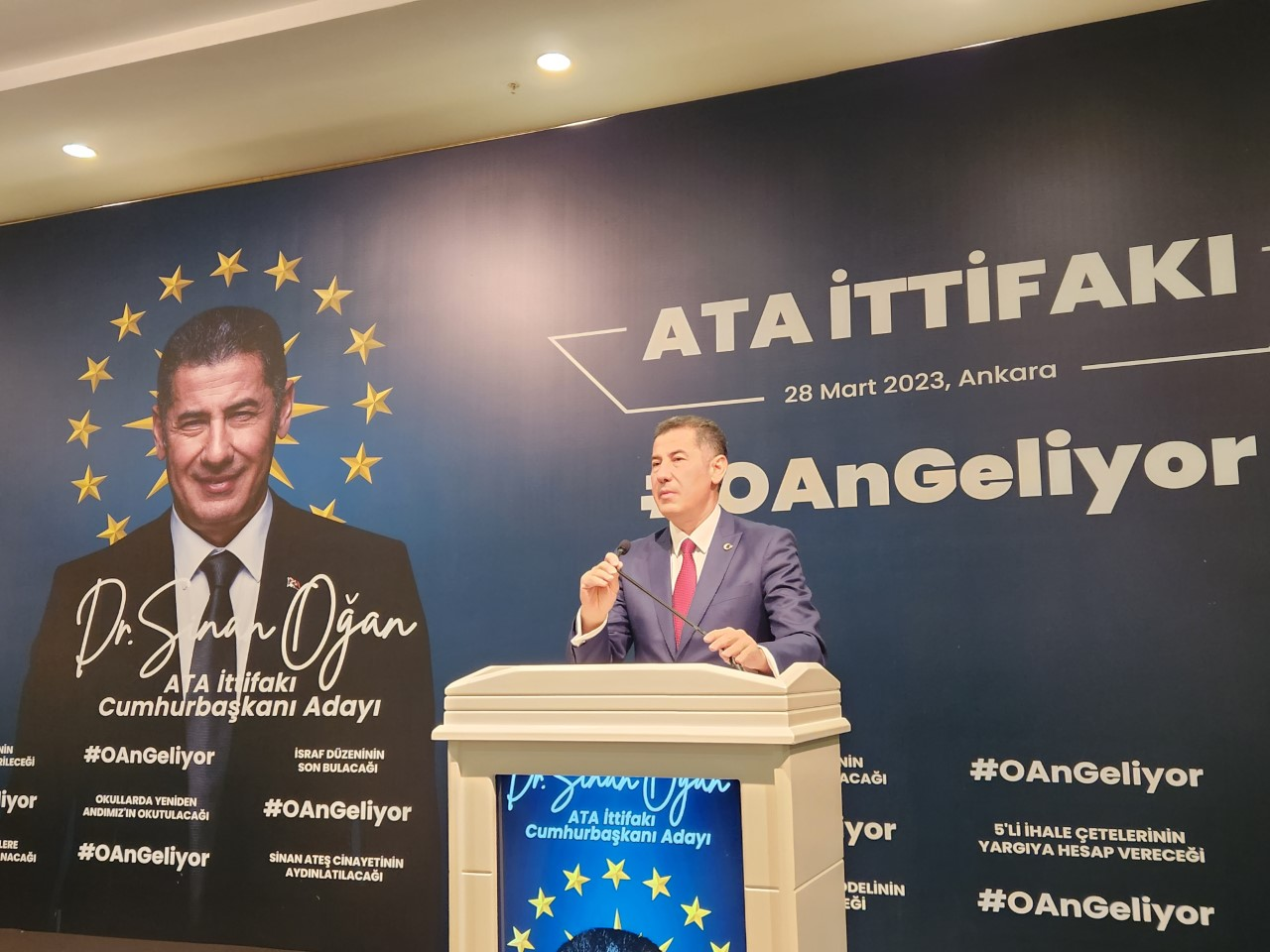
- Campaign: 2023 Turkish presidential election
- Candidate: Sinan Oğan Grand National Assembly of Turkey MP (2011–2015); TÜRKSAM chairperson (2004–present)
- Affiliation: Ancestral Alliance (2023)
- Status: 5.18% (3rd place, supported Recep Tayyip Erdoğan in the second round.)
- Slogan: The moment is coming

Sinan Oğan became the joint presidential candidate of the Ancestral Alliance in the 2023 Turkish presidential election.

== Background ==
in 2020; Sinan Oğan participated a program, he said, "If the elections will be held on time, you are talking to one of the possible rivals right now. I can say that".

In 2021, he said, "I am a politician who aspires to govern Turkey when there is a political environment. If a Turkish nationalist is not a candidate, I will run for the presidency. HDP nominates a PKK member, they have a candidate; conservatives have a candidate, leftists, CHP have a candidate; only Turkish nationalists do not have a candidate."

In April 2022, he held a meeting in Ankara with the heads of 20 political parties. The formation called itself the Alliance of Turkey, 2023 Turkish presidential elections in Turkey, Sinan Oğan was reported to have been nominated as a candidate.

In September 2022, İsmail Saymaz wrote about Oğan: "Mr. Tayyip and Mr. Kemal will have a serious fight. People are tired. There is a possibility that a young, dynamic and new face could break through, like Macron. The first goal is to remove the Peoples' Democratic Party as a key party, to bring nationalists together and make it to the second round if there is a chance to get through."

On March 11, 2023, the day the Ancestral Alliance was announced, it was also announced that the presidential candidate of the alliance was Sinan Oğan. On March 26, Oğan reached the 100,000 signatures required for a candidate nominated by voters.

== Campaign ==
Sinan Oğan stated that their votes were around 16% Iove "I think we will win, I think we will make it to the second round. We will see if we can't stay." On March 14, he announced that if elected president, his deputy would be Sevda Ozbek. On April 5, 2023, the chairman of the Victory Party is Ümit Özdağ; Sinan Oğan, announced that he would request an appointment with the other presidential candidates to discuss election security. Sinan Oğan on election security; 12 April 2023, with Kemal Kılıçdaroğlu, the presidential candidate of the National Alliance, On April 15, 2023, he met with Muharrem İnce.

== Post-election ==
Oğan said that "Turkish nationalists and Atatürk supporters will be the decision-makers in the second round". Oğan demanded that he doesn't want any party, which he considers connected to terrorism, to have any role in the government. He is against the presence of a Kurdish party in the "political equation". He mentioned two parties specifically: HÜDA PAR, a Kurdish Islamist party allied with Erdoğan, and the pro-Kurdish HDP, which supported Kılıçdaroğlu. If Kılıçdaroğlu signed a protocol he would not make concessions to the HDP, he could receive Oğans support. Oğan announced that he would support the People's Alliance candidate Recep Tayyip Erdoğan in the second round of the election on May 28, 2023.

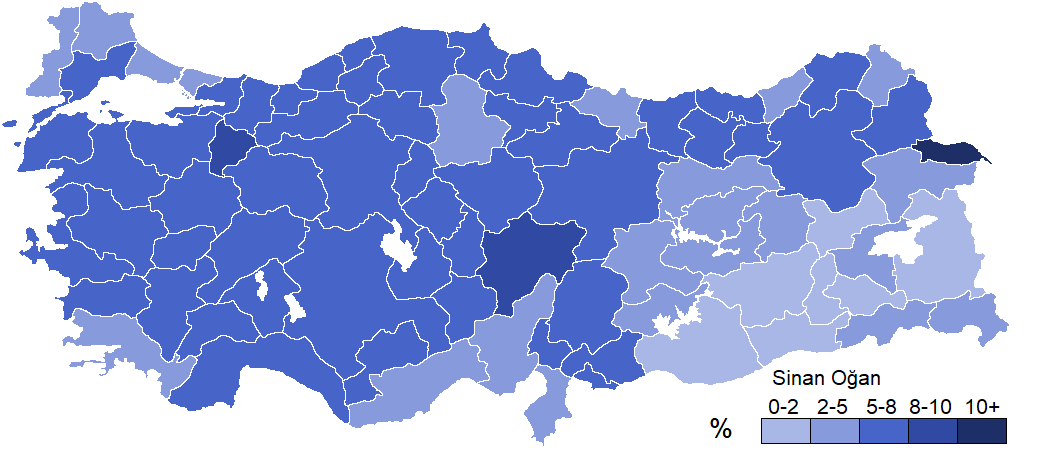
Results for Sinan Ogan from the first round, by province

== See also ==
- 2023 Recep Tayyip Erdoğan presidential campaign
- 2023 Kemal Kılıçdaroğlu presidential campaign
