= Tahir Akyurek =

Turkish politician (born 1959)

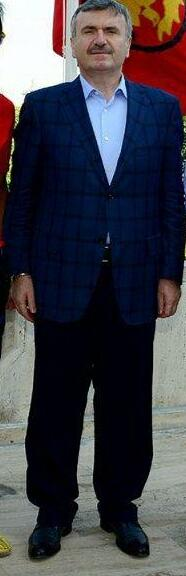
Tahir Akyurek

Tahir Akyurek (born 1959 in Derebucak, Turkey) is a Turkish politician of the Justice and Development Party (AK Party) and a former mayor of Konya.

After he graduated in law from Ankara University, Tahir Akyurek worked in Konya as a lawyer at the Provincial Directorate of Bag-Kur.

He has also served as General Secretary of the Konya Chamber of Commerce.

In the 2004 local government elections he scored 63% of the vote and was elected mayor of Konya. He was elected for a second term in the March 2009 election.

He is married and has three children.

In 2009 he announced that Konya would introduce a "smart bicycle" facility into its transport system in 2010.

In the 2018 Turkish parliamentary election, he was elected to the Grand National Assembly of Turkey from Konya. He was re-elected in 2023.
