= Ersan Şen =

Turkish jurist (born 1966)

- Born: 16 July 1966 (age 60); Nevşehir, Turkey
- Education: Marmara University; Istanbul University
- Occupations: Academic; Lawyer

Ersan Şen (born 16 July 1966) is a Turkish lawyer, legal scholar and a faculty member at the Faculty of Political Sciences of Istanbul University.

== Biography ==
Şen was born in Nevşehir on 16 July 1966. He graduated from Kabataş Boys High School in 1983. He obtained a degree in law from Marmara University in 1987. He received his master's degree in law from Marmara University and his PhD in public law from Istanbul University. He joined Istanbul University and became a professor of law in 2004. He is a faculty member at the Faculty of Political Sciences of Istanbul University.

Şen announced his candidacy for the presidential election to be held in May 2023, but after the announcement of Kemal Kılıçdaroğlu's candidacy for office it was not materialized.

Şen has published various books. He is the coeditor of The Political Psychology of Kurds in Turkey: Critical Perspectives on Identity, Narratives, and Resistance which was published by Palgrave Macmillan in 2023.

It was claimed that Ersan Şen, who frequently participates in discussion programs broadcast on news channels, founded a new news channel called Ekol TV and that the channel would start broadcasting in 2024. However, Şen announced that he had abandoned the project in November 2023. However, the shares of Ekol TV were taken over by Azeri businessman Mübariz Mansimov and it started broadcasting on April 29, 2024.
