= 2023 Turkish presidential election =

Second re-election of Recep Tayyip Erdoğan

- 14 May 2023 (first round); 28 May 2023 (second round)
- Opinion polls
- Turnout: 87.04% (first round) ▲0.80pp; 84.15% (second round) ▼2.89pp
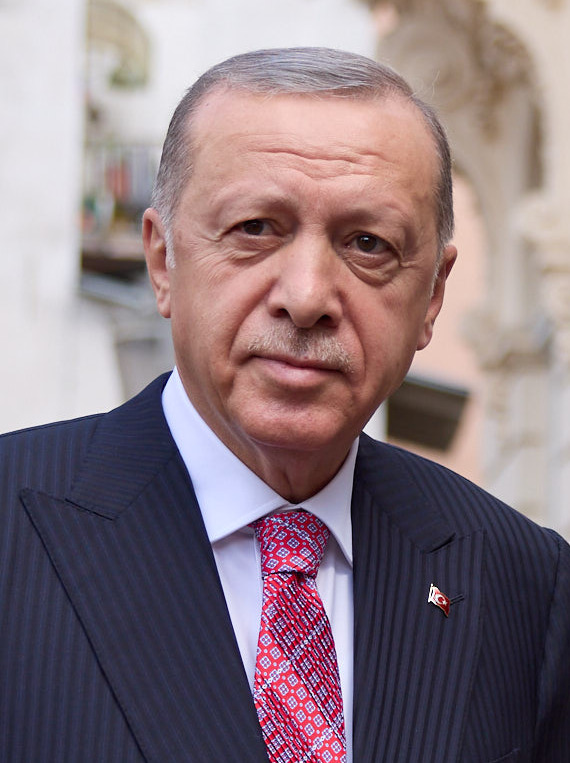

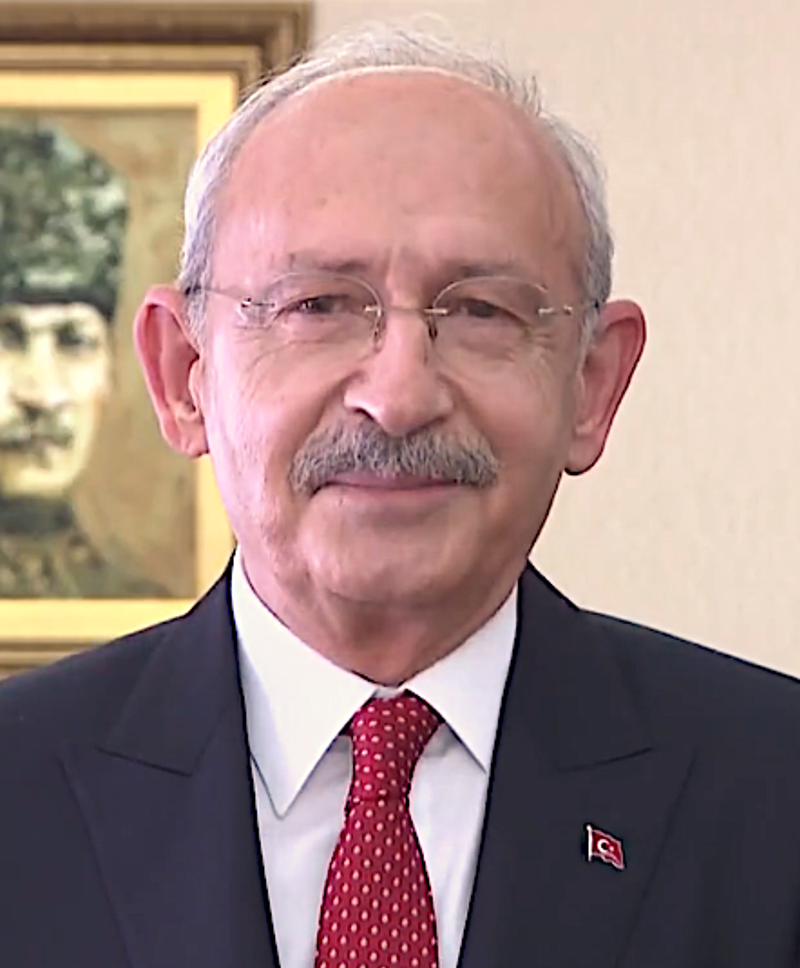
Candidate	Recep Tayyip Erdoğan	Kemal Kılıçdaroğlu
Party	AK Party	CHP
Alliance	People	Nation
Popular vote	27,834,589	25,504,704
Percentage	52.18%	47.82%
President before election
Recep Tayyip Erdoğan
AK Party
Elected President
Recep Tayyip Erdoğan
AK Party

Presidential elections were held in Turkey in May 2023, alongside parliamentary elections, to elect a president for a term of five years. Dubbed the most important election of 2023, the presidential election went to a run-off for the first time in Turkish history. The election had originally been scheduled to take place on 18 June, but the government moved them forward by a month to avoid coinciding with the university exams, the Hajj pilgrimage and the start of the summer holidays. It is estimated that a total of 64 million voters had the right to cast their votes in elections, 60.9 million in Turkey and 3.2 million abroad.

Incumbent president Recep Tayyip Erdoğan of the Justice and Development Party (AK Party) ran for re-election as the joint candidate of the People's Alliance, which includes the Nationalist Movement Party (MHP) and two other smaller parties. The Nation Alliance, composed of six opposition parties including the main opposition Republican People's Party (CHP), fielded CHP leader Kemal Kılıçdaroğlu as its presidential candidate. Though not part of the alliance, the pro-Kurdish Party of Greens and the Left Future (YSGP) and the Labour and Freedom Alliance (of which it is a member) endorsed Kılıçdaroğlu. Two other minor candidates, namely Homeland Party leader Muharrem İnce and anti-immigration ultranationalist Ancestral Alliance nominee Sinan Oğan, also reached the required 100,000 signatures to stand; however, three days before the election, İnce withdrew from the election citing consistent slander and smear campaigns against him by rival candidates, though he still appeared on ballots.

The main campaign issues revolved around the deadly February 2023 Turkey–Syria earthquake, which left over 50,000 people dead and threatened to postpone the election date. The government was criticised by opposition politicians for its slow response to the earthquake and land amnesties prior to it that critics claimed left buildings more vulnerable. The economy also featured prominently due to the rapidly rising cost of living. In most polls, voters identified the economy as their prime area of concern.

In the first round Erdoğan and Oğan outperformed expectations to receive 49.5% and 5.2% of the vote respectively, while Kılıçdaroğlu received 44.9% and Muharrem İnce (who remained on the ballot despite withdrawing) 0.4%. As Erdoğan's vote share was 0.5% short of winning outright, he and Kılıçdaroğlu contested a run-off vote on 28 May. Oğan endorsed Erdoğan, while the elements of Ancestral Alliance split their support, as Victory Party leader Ümit Özdağ endorsed Kılıçdaroğlu and My Country Party leader Neşet Doğan endorsed Erdoğan. Erdoğan would be re-elected to a third term with 52.2% of the vote in the runoff.

This was incumbent President's Recep Tayyip Erdoğan's eleventh election victory in a row going back to his election as Mayor of Istanbul in 1994. His victory was seen as a continuation of his nearly three-decades dominance over Turkish politics. In contrast, following Kılıçdaroğlu's narrow defeat, he was voted out as the leader of the CHP in November.

== Background ==
=== 2018 elections ===
The previous Turkish general election took place on 24 June 2018. The election marked the country's transition from a parliamentary system to a presidential one, as narrowly endorsed by voters in the controversial 2017 constitutional referendum. That election resulted in a victory for incumbent president Recep Tayyip Erdoğan, who had held the position since 2014. Meanwhile, the ruling Justice and Development Party (AKP) lost its absolute majority in the Grand National Assembly of Turkey for the first time since June 2015, forcing it to rely on its coalition partner, the Nationalist Movement Party (MHP) of Devlet Bahçeli, to pass legislation.

== Date ==
The regular scheduled date for the first round of the elections was set for 18 June 2023. However, the electoral system allowed for moving the date forward. In 2020, there was speculation about a snap election prior to the regular one in 2023. At the time, Devlet Bahçeli, the leader of coalition partner MHP, ruled them out. In a written statement, he said that elections would not be held before 2023. He also confirmed that the current coalition between AKP and MHP will remain intact and Recep Tayyip Erdoğan will be their joint nominee for President.

=== Discussion on snap elections ===
In early January 2023 the AKP mentioned eventual snap elections to take place on either on 16 or 30 April or on 14 May. But the so-called "Table of Six" composed by six opposition parties announced that they would not agree to snap elections after 6 April. On 18 January 2023, Erdoğan, the President of Turkey, signalled that the elections will be held earlier than the scheduled date, specifically on 14 May 2023, in a symbolic reference to the election victory of former Prime Minister Adnan Menderes on 14 May in the 1950 Turkish general election, defeating the candidate of the then governing CHP party. On 22 January 2023, Erdoğan stated that the elections will be held on 14 May. In view of that date, the "Table of Six" announced that Erdoğan cannot run for president without parliamentary consent.

=== Discussion on postponing election date ===
After a devastating earthquake struck the country in February 2023, Erdoğan announced a state of emergency for 10 affected provinces, which would end a week ahead of the election date of the 14 May. The opposition voted against the imposition in parliament. Then on 13 February 2023, Bülent Arınç, a former AKP Member of Parliament, alleged the elections could not be held in the current situation in either May or June, and the elections should be postponed. AKP spokesperson Ömer Çelik responded that Arınç's statement is his own personal view and does not bind the party. Kemal Kılıçdaroğlu from the opposition party Republican People's Party (CHP) responded to Arınç's statement that the constitution would not provide a possibility to postpone the elections except in the case of war. Further, Mustafa Tolga Öztürk from the Good Party reasoned only the parliament has the authority to postpone elections and Selahattin Demirtaş from the Peoples' Democratic Party (HDP) suspected such a measure would result in a political coup.

=== Election calendar ===
The Supreme Election Council announced the following election calendar for the 2023 presidential elections and the parliamentary elections.

- 18 March: The Supreme Election Council announces the official start of the election cycle.
- 19 March: Submission of candidacy applications to the Supreme Election Council.
- 20 March: Independent presidential candidates can apply until 17.00. Applications of independent candidates are examined by the Supreme Election Council and the candidates will be notified if their application is missing documents or other shortcomings as of 23:00.
- 21 March: Independent presidential candidates whose application has been rejected by the Supreme Election Council, can appeal and request a re-examination until 17:00.
  - Deadline for political parties to nominate a presidential candidate.
- 28 March: Announcement of the temporary list of presidential candidates and start of appeal applications.
- 31 March: Announcement of the final list of presidential candidates.
- 1 April: Presentation of ballot paper with the presidential candidates.
- 12 April: Finalization of the domestic and international voter registers.
- 27 April: Start of voting procedures at customs gates and abroad.
- 9 May: Deadline for voting abroad.
- 13 May: End of election campaigning and start of election silence at 18:00.
- 14 May: Voting day. Announcement of the temporary results of the presidential election at 23:59.
- 19 May: Announcement of the final election results by the Supreme Election Council.

In case of a two-rounded presidential election:

- 15 May: Start of election campaigning for the second round of the presidential election.
- 20 May: Start of voting procedures at customs gates and abroad.
- 24 May: Deadline for voting abroad.
- 27 May: End of election campaigning and start of election silence at 18:00.
- 28 May: Voting day. Second round of the presidential election.
- 29 May: Announcement of the temporary results of the presidential election.
- 1 June: Announcement of the final results of the presidential election.

== Electoral system ==
The President of Turkey is directly elected through the two-round system, under which a candidate must obtain a simple majority (more than 50%) of the popular vote to be elected. If no candidate secures an overall majority outright, then a runoff is held between the two most voted-for candidates from the first round, the winner of which is then declared elected. The first direct election to the Turkish presidency was held in 2014, after a referendum in 2007 abolished the previous system under which the head of state was elected by the legislature chamber, the Grand National Assembly of Turkey. The President of Turkey is subject to term limits, and may serve at most two five-year terms. If snap elections were held before the end of the second term, a third term would be permitted. Snap elections can be held either with the consent of 60% of the MPs in the Grand National Assembly of Turkey or ordered by presidential decree. Only snap elections via the consent of the Grand National Assembly during a president's second term can allow the president to serve a third term.

Prospective presidential candidates must be at least 40 years old and must have completed higher education. Any political party that has won 5% of the vote in the previous parliamentary election can put forward a candidate, although parties that have not met this threshold can form alliances and field joint candidates as long as their total vote share exceeds 5%. Independents can run if they collect 100,000 signatures from the electorate. Elections are overseen by the Supreme Election Council (YSK).

== Candidates ==
=== Candidates ===
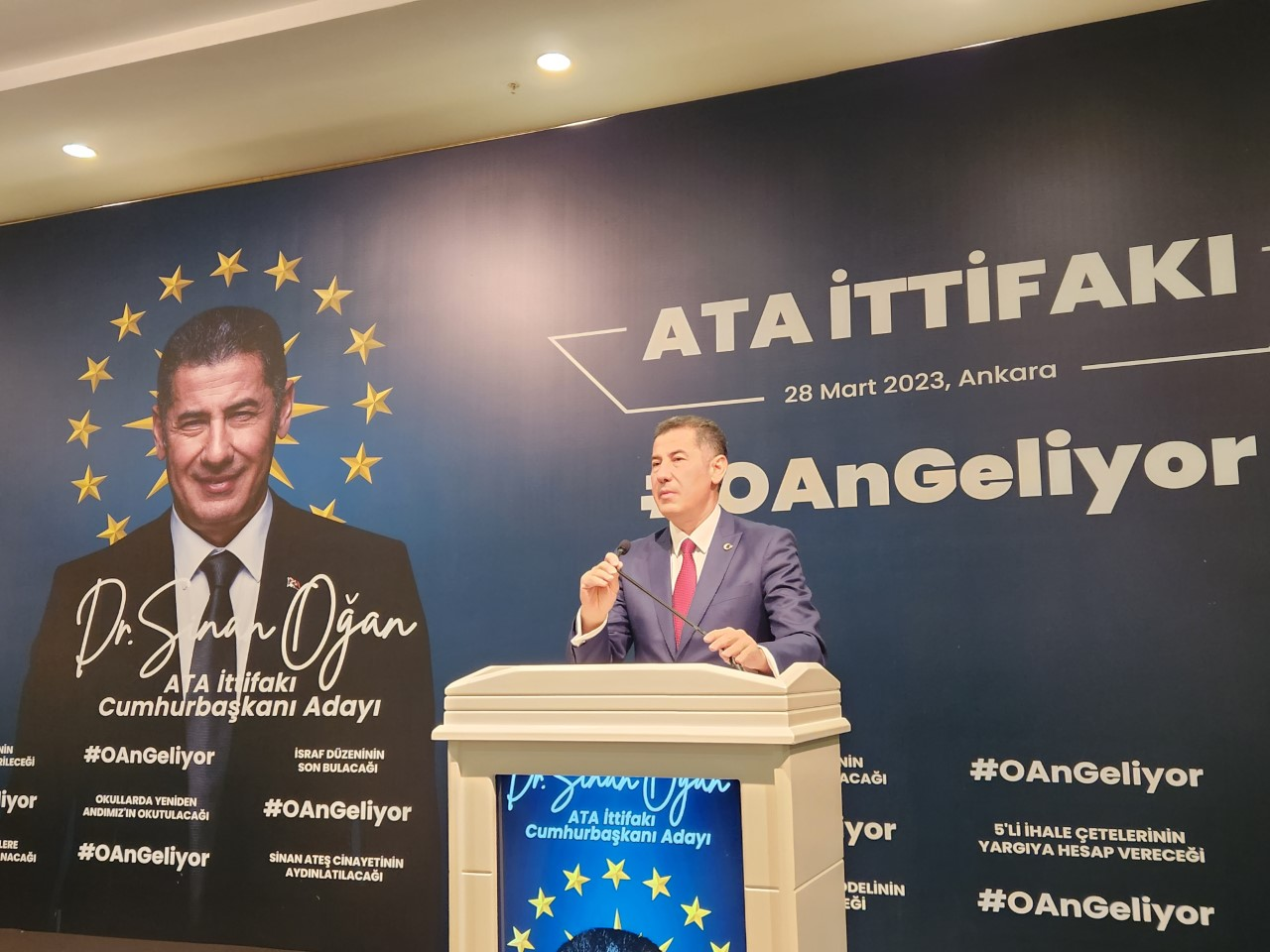
Sinan Oğan launching his campaign

- Recep Tayyip Erdoğan, incumbent President of Turkey (2014–present), leader of the Justice and Development Party (AK Party)
  - Supported by: People's Alliance
- Kemal Kılıçdaroğlu, leader of Republican People's Party, leader of the opposition. He was announced the candidate by the opposition alliance "Table of Six" on 6 March 2023.
  - Supported by: Nation Alliance, Labour and Freedom Alliance
- Muharrem İnce, leader of the Homeland Party, candidate for president in 2018 (withdrawn, appearing on ballot). (Note: Withdrew candidacy on 11 May 2023, remained on the ballot.)
- Sinan Oğan, former member of the parliament from MHP (2011–2015) (running as Independent)
  - Supported by Ancestral Alliance

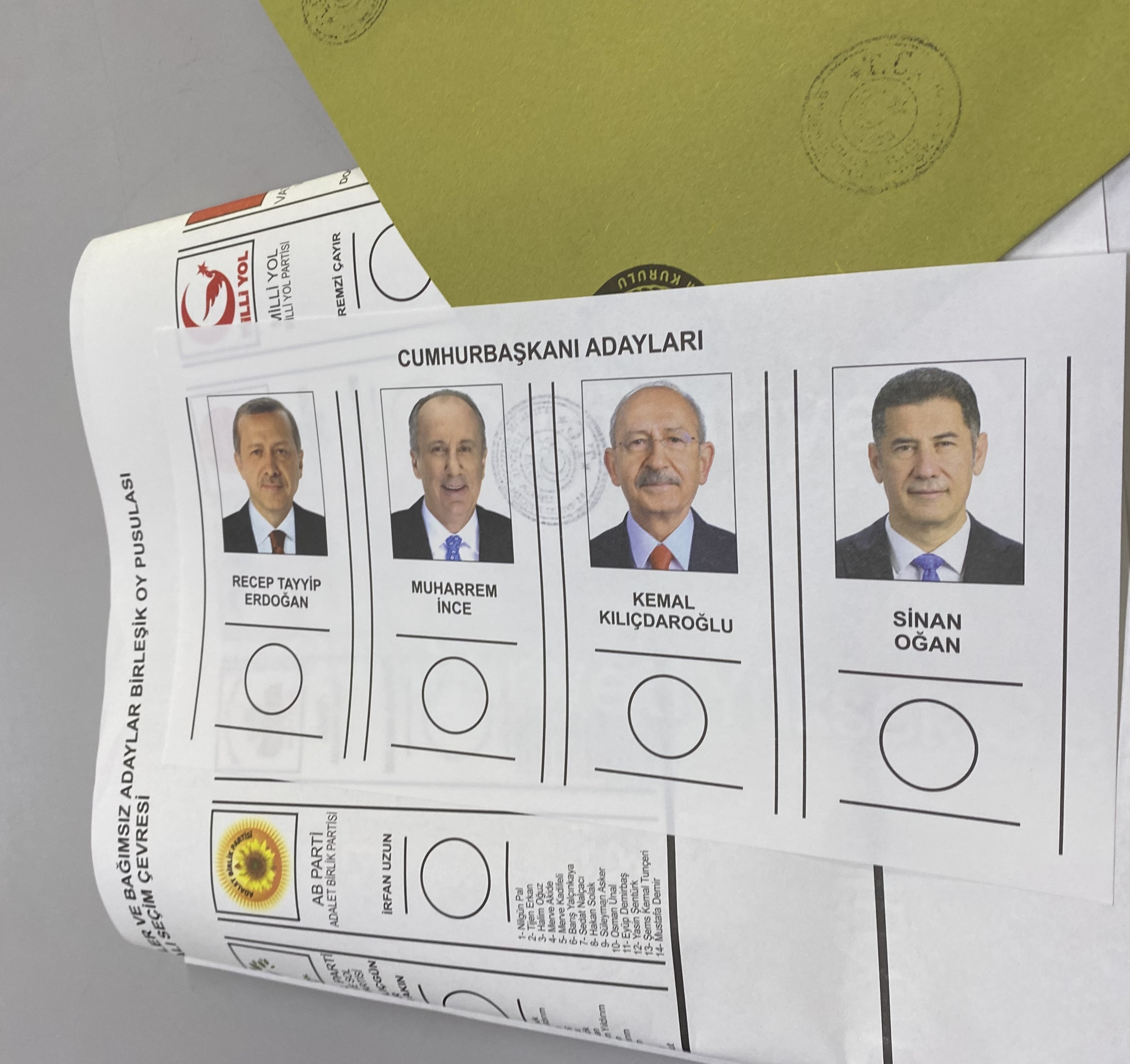
Ballot paper (1st round)

On 1 April, after a drawing conducted by the Supreme Electoral Council, the places of four presidential candidates on the ballot paper were determined as follows:

List of presidential candidates in order they appear on the ballot paper (Note: Alliances and parties do not appear on the official ballot paper.)
1				2	3						4			
Recep Tayyip Erdoğan				Muharrem İnce	Kemal Kılıçdaroğlu						Sinan Oğan			
People's Alliance				—N/a	Nation Alliance						Ancestral Alliance			
AK Party	MHP	BBP	YRP	MP	CHP	İYİ	DEVA	GP	SP	DP	ZP	AP	ÜP	TÜİP
Campaign				Campaign	Campaign						Campaign			

=== Nominations ===
According to article 101 of the Constitution of Turkey, amended following the 2017 constitutional referendum, any political party that has won 5% of the vote in the previous parliamentary election can put forward a candidate. The remaining candidates were required to collect at least 100,000 signatures.

Voters were able to give signatures to their preferred presidential candidate between 22 and 27 March at their local electoral council branch.

On 24 March, the New Welfare Party decided to join the People's Alliance. After this decision, Fatih Erbakan announced that he had ended the candidacy process in favour of Erdoğan.

Party	Candidate	Daily signatures						Result
Party	Candidate	22 March	23 March	24 March	25 March	26 March	27 March	Result
Homeland Party	Muharrem İnce	28,235	51,367	76,901	✓ 104,357	109,745	114,657	✓ Nominated
—N/a	Sinan Oğan	15,573	25,924	39,317	63,027	✓ 102,667	111,502	✓ Nominated
New Welfare Party	Fatih Erbakan (Note: Ended his candidacy process on 24 March.)	27,910	46,725	69,079	69,159	69,200	69,255	✗ Not nominated
Patriotic Party	Doğu Perinçek	6,679	11,792	16,192	20,400	23,776	27,055	✗ Not nominated
—N/a	Yakup Türkal	993	1,645	2,031	2,462	2,780	3,137	✗ Not nominated
—N/a	Erkan Trükten	397	755	1,116	1,604	1,940	2,588	✗ Not nominated
—N/a	Ahmet Özal	237	567	807	1,025	1,311	1,544	✗ Not nominated
Justice Unity Party	İrfan Uzun	176	319	447	698	1,001	1,263	✗ Not nominated
—N/a	Halil Murat Ünver	119	211	285	369	444	538	✗ Not nominated
—N/a	Hilmi Özden	60	151	225	333	405	478	✗ Not nominated
—N/a	Davut Turan	34	68	92	106	111	122	✗ Not nominated
Totals		80,413	139,524	206,494	263,540	313,380	332,139	

== Endorsements ==
=== Parties and alliances ===
Candidate	Endorsement		Ideology
Erdoğan; People's Alliance; AK Party	People's Alliance	MHP (Nationalist Movement Party)	Turkish ultranationalism
Erdoğan; People's Alliance; AK Party	People's Alliance	BBP (Great Unity Party)	Turkish Islamonationalism
Erdoğan; People's Alliance; AK Party	People's Alliance	YRP (New Welfare Party)	Millî Görüş
Erdoğan; People's Alliance; AK Party	HÜDAPAR (Free Cause Party)		Kurdish Islamism
Erdoğan; People's Alliance; AK Party	DSP (Democratic Left Party)		Social democracy
Erdoğan; People's Alliance; AK Party	BÜYÜK TÜRKİYE (Great Turkey Party)		Pan-Turkism
Erdoğan; People's Alliance; AK Party	DYP (True Path Party)		Liberal conservatism
Erdoğan; People's Alliance; AK Party	YENİ DÜNYA (New World Party)		Conservatism
Erdoğan; People's Alliance; AK Party	VATAN PARTİSİ (Patriotic Party) (second round)		Left-wing nationalism
Erdoğan; People's Alliance; AK Party	TÜİP (Turkey Alliance Party) (second round)		Kemalism
Erdoğan; People's Alliance; AK Party	ÜLKEM (My Country Party) (second round)		Turkish nationalism
Kılıçdaroğlu; Nation Alliance; CHP	Nation Alliance	İYİ PARTİ (Good Party)	Turkish nationalism
Kılıçdaroğlu; Nation Alliance; CHP	Nation Alliance	DEVA (Democracy and Progress Party)	Liberal conservatism
Kılıçdaroğlu; Nation Alliance; CHP	Nation Alliance	GP (Future Party)	Conservatism
Kılıçdaroğlu; Nation Alliance; CHP	Nation Alliance	SAADET (Felicity Party)	Millî Görüş
Kılıçdaroğlu; Nation Alliance; CHP	Nation Alliance	DP (Democrat Party)	Liberal conservatism
Kılıçdaroğlu; Nation Alliance; CHP	Labour and Freedom Alliance	TİP (Workers' Party of Turkey)	Socialism
Kılıçdaroğlu; Nation Alliance; CHP	Labour and Freedom Alliance	HDP (Peoples' Democratic Party)	Regionalism
Kılıçdaroğlu; Nation Alliance; CHP	Labour and Freedom Alliance	Yeşil Sol Parti (Party of Greens and the Left Future)	Green politics
Kılıçdaroğlu; Nation Alliance; CHP	Labour and Freedom Alliance	EMEP (Labour Party)	Communism
Kılıçdaroğlu; Nation Alliance; CHP	Labour and Freedom Alliance	EHP (Labourist Movement Party)	Communism
Kılıçdaroğlu; Nation Alliance; CHP	Labour and Freedom Alliance	TÖP (Social Freedom Party)	Communism
Kılıçdaroğlu; Nation Alliance; CHP	Union of Socialist Forces	SOL PARTİ (Left Party)	Socialism
Kılıçdaroğlu; Nation Alliance; CHP	Union of Socialist Forces	TKP (Communist Party of Turkey)	Communism
Kılıçdaroğlu; Nation Alliance; CHP	Union of Socialist Forces	TKH (Communist Movement of Turkey)	Communism
Kılıçdaroğlu; Nation Alliance; CHP	Union of Socialist Forces	DH (Revolution Movement)	Communism
Kılıçdaroğlu; Nation Alliance; CHP	TDP (Party for Change in Turkey)		Social democracy
Kılıçdaroğlu; Nation Alliance; CHP	LDP (Liberal Democratic Party)		Classical liberalism
Kılıçdaroğlu; Nation Alliance; CHP	BTP (Independent Turkey Party)		Kemalism
Kılıçdaroğlu; Nation Alliance; CHP	HKP (People's Liberation Party)		Communism
Kılıçdaroğlu; Nation Alliance; CHP	MTP (Nationalist Turkey Party)		Turkish nationalism
Kılıçdaroğlu; Nation Alliance; CHP	KP (Women's Party)		Feminism
Kılıçdaroğlu; Nation Alliance; CHP	TEK PARTİ (Technology Development Party)		Liberalism
Kılıçdaroğlu; Nation Alliance; CHP	YEŞİLLER (Green Party)		Green politics
Kılıçdaroğlu; Nation Alliance; CHP	DOĞRU PARTİ (The True Party)		Kemalism
Kılıçdaroğlu; Nation Alliance; CHP	AP (Justice Party) (second round)		Liberal conservatism
Kılıçdaroğlu; Nation Alliance; CHP	ZP (Victory Party) (second round)		Anti-immigration
Kılıçdaroğlu; Nation Alliance; CHP	MEP (Centre Party) (second round)		Liberalism
Kılıçdaroğlu; Nation Alliance; CHP	DSİP (Revolutionary Socialist Workers' Party) (second round)		Trotskyism
Kılıçdaroğlu; Nation Alliance; CHP	SCP (Socialist Republican Party) (second round)		Marxism
Kılıçdaroğlu; Nation Alliance; CHP	Milli Yol (National Path Party) (second round)		Turkish nationalism
Kılıçdaroğlu; Nation Alliance; CHP	İDP (Labor Democracy Party) (second round)		Marxism
Kılıçdaroğlu; Nation Alliance; CHP	AB PARTİ (Justice Unity Party) (second round)		Kemalism
Oğan; Ancestral Alliance; Independent	Ancestral Alliance	ZP (Victory Party)	Anti-immigration
Oğan; Ancestral Alliance; Independent	Ancestral Alliance	AP (Justice Party)	Liberal conservatism
Oğan; Ancestral Alliance; Independent	Ancestral Alliance	ÜLKEM (My Country Party)	Turkish nationalism
Oğan; Ancestral Alliance; Independent	Ancestral Alliance	TÜİP (Turkey Alliance Party)	Kemalism
Oğan; Ancestral Alliance; Independent	ANAP (Motherland Party)		Liberal conservatism

== Second round ==
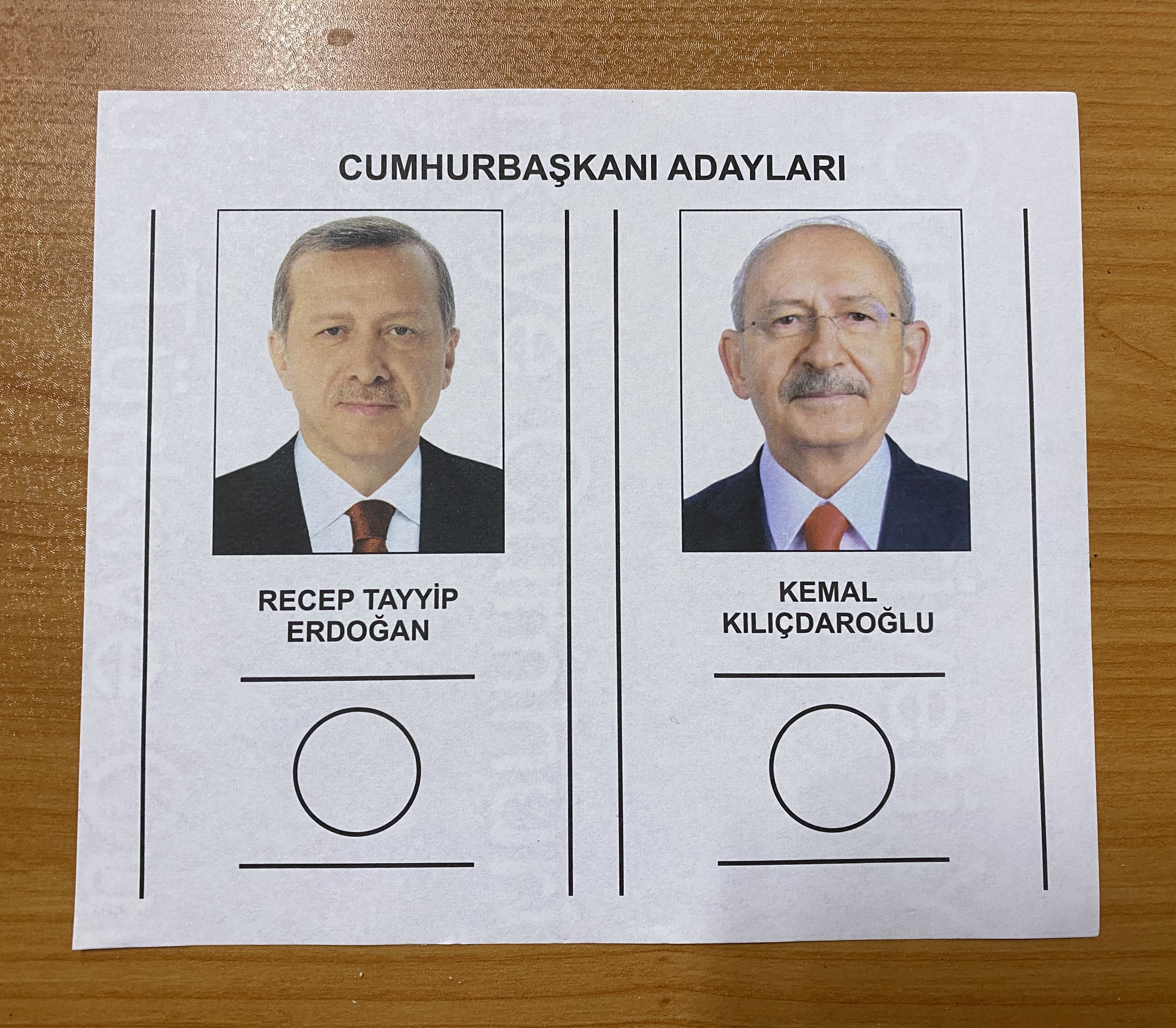
Ballot paper (2nd round)

The first round of elections showed a shift further to the nationalist sentiment.

=== Negotiations by Oğan and Özdağ ===
Oğan said that "Turkish nationalists and Atatürk supporters will be the decision-makers in the second round". Oğan demanded that he doesn't want any party, that he considers connected to terrorism, to have any role in the government. He is against the presence of a Kurdish party in the "political equation". He mentioned two parties specifically: HÜDA PAR, a Kurdish Islamist party allied with Erdoğan, and the pro-Kurdish HDP, which supported Kılıçdaroğlu. If Kılıçdaroğlu signed a protocol he would not make concessions to the HDP, he could receive Oğan's support. On 19 May, Kılıçdaroğlu visited the headquarters of the Victory Party and met with its leader Özdağ. The same day, Oğan met Erdoğan for negotiations, while Erdoğan told CNN International he "would not bow to Oğan's wishes", adding he's "not the kind of person who likes to bargain like this". Bahçeli published a message on the occasion of the Commemoration of Atatürk, Youth and Sports Day; alluding to Oğan, he said "those who pretend to have non-existent political power and turn politics into a horse market are opportunistic weaklings". On 22 May, AKP deputy chairman Numan Kurtulmuş visited Özdağ at Victory Party headquarters, where he stated that they shared similar ideas with the Victory Party on various issues such as national security and noted they hoped the party would support Erdogan in the second round. The same day, Özdağ and Kılıçdaroğlu came together for the second time. During the meeting, Özdağ presented a memorandum of understanding to Kılıçdaroğlu. Özdağ's main terms included "continuation of the trustee practice for the fight against terrorism" and "forcibly returning the immigrants within a year if necessary". He also said that they're "still trying to close the gates of hell", referring to Oğan's old quote.

==== Dissolution of ATA Alliance ====
On 21 May, it was announced that Kılıçdaroğlu would visit the Justice Party headquarters on 22 May. The same day, its leader Vecdet Öz announced his support of Kılıçdaroğlu, saying "it is essential to get rid of the current government", and adding that "staying neutral means giving indirect support to the current government". Later, Öz announced that the alliance has officially ended.

==== Endorsement of Erdoğan by Oğan ====
On 22 May, Oğan announced his endorsement of Erdoğan for the second round, while Özdağ stated that Oğan's statement doesn't bind the Victory Party. Later Erdoğan thanked Oğan, and added that there was "absolutely no bargaining" between them.

==== Özdağ's support for Kılıçdaroğlu ====
On 24 May, Özdağ announced his support for Kılıçdaroğlu. They signed a seven-point protocol, which reads as follows:

- The first four articles of our Constitution and the definition and content of Turkish Citizenship in Article 66 will be preserved.
- The national-unitary-secular state established in 1924 will never be compromised.
- All asylum seekers and fugitives, especially Syrians, will be sent back to their countries within one year at the latest.
- All terrorist organizations targeting the existence and integrity of the state, especially FETÖ, PKK and ISIS, will be fought effectively and decisively. Within the framework of the fight against terrorism, the practice of appointing state officials instead of local administrators whose links with terrorism are proven by legal evidence will continue within the framework of judicial decision. Terrorism will be fought, not negotiated. No political and legal arrangements targeting the national and unitary state structure of Turkey will be allowed.
- In assignments to be made in all units of the state, it will be ensured that merit, not loyalty, is the basis.
- All corruption will be dealt with very effectively within the framework of the law.
- It is fully agreed that the state should be transparent and open to its citizens.

The fourth article in the protocol, created some concerns especially among HDP voter base and raised the question of whether they will boycott the election. Next day, nevertheless, HDP and Green Left Party have announced that they will continue to support Kılıçdaroğlu in the second round, and said they "will change the one-man regime". HDP co-chair Pervin Buldan said "We never get stuck with Ümit Özdağ's racist and fascist statements. The main thing for us is the promises made by Mr. Kılıçdaroğlu to the society."

The Good Party leader Meral Akşener said "there is nothing in that protocol that bothers us".

=== Erdoğan's strategy ===
He was scheduled to meet with the victims of recent earthquakes to show his solidarity and commitment.

=== Kılıçdaroğlu's strategy ===
According to journalist İsmail Saymaz, Kılıçdaroğlu was going to adopt a more aggressive language until 28 May and the AK Party would be attacked over the relationship between HÜDA PAR and Hezbollah. A counter stance would be taken regarding terrorism and security policies. The issue of Syrians and illegal immigrants would be highlighted. On 18 May, Kılıçdaroğlu told supporters that the influx of refugees threatens their survival, and vowed to repatriate millions of refugees to their home countries. Kılıçdaroğlu claimed that Erdoğan, has "deliberately allowed ten million refugees into Turkey" and has put "Turkish citizenship on sale to get imported votes".

=== Potential debate ===
Due to the accusations of who was a supporter of terrorists, which both contenders deem the other to be, Kılıçdaroğlu suggested holding a debate, but Erdoğan refused on the grounds that Kılıçdaroğlu wants to become famous.

== Controversies ==
=== Erdoğan's right to seek re-election ===
Before the 2018 elections, Turkish presidents were serving as heads of state within a parliamentary system. After the 2017 constitutional referendum, Turkey adopted a presidential system in which the president serves as the head of government. Some opposition politicians state that since Erdoğan was elected president twice in 2014 and 2018, he cannot be a candidate again unless an early election is called by the Parliament, as stated in Article 116 of the constitution. Some jurists argue that since the presidential system was introduced in 2018 and a new office was formed apart from the similarity in name, the 2018 election was Erdoğan's first term in the new system and that he has the right to be a candidate again.

=== Political violence ===
On 10 March, CHP parliamentary group deputy chair Özgür Özel claimed that Kılıçdaroğlu received assassination threats by unknown groups and was offered a minister's armoured vehicle by the government, but he rejected the proposal and kept his official car.

On 7 May, Istanbul Mayor Ekrem İmamoğlu was attacked during a rally in Erzurum. His rally was interrupted due to stones thrown from the crowd. After the attack, İmamoğlu supporters rushed to the Sabiha Gökçen Airport in Istanbul to welcome and show support for him. Erzurum's mayor Mehmet Sekmen said that there was no written application made from Republican People's Party's provincial chairmanship to hold a rally in Erzurum, and it was İmamoğlu "was the one who created the chaos by rallying in Erzurum". The Interior Minister Süleyman Soylu said that the incident was planned by İmamoğlu to aggravate the crowds.

On 12 May, extensive security measures were taken before and during Kılıçdaroğlu's rally in Samsun following the rumours of assassination attempts of Kılıçdaroğlu. Citizens who wanted to attend the rally held in Republic Square were searched twice. Snipers were placed on the roofs of buildings located around the square. İmamoğlu and Kılıçdaroğlu, who took the stage to make their speeches, were seen wearing bulletproof vests. While Kılıçdaroğlu was giving his speech, a large guard group accompanied him on the stage armed.

While visiting the burials of citizens who lost their lives during the earthquake in Adıyaman Province, Kılıçdaroğlu was subjected to a verbal attack while he was reciting Al-Fatiha. The same day, another person attempted a physical attack.

Two days after the attack on İmamoğlu, Kılıçdaroğlu's vehicle was attacked with stones in Sakarya. The 15-year-old attacker was released after Kılıçdaroğlu decided not to press charges and he also asked for the anonymity of the child's identity.

=== Erdoğan's photo on ballot paper ===
Erdoğan appeared with the same photograph on the ballot paper as the one he used for the presidential elections in 2014 and 2018.

=== Fake videos ===
On the Sunday before the elections Erdoğan showed an altered version of an election commercial belonging to his main challenger Kılıçdaroğlu. This commercial was edited with footage of Murat Karayılan, one of the founders of the PKK, in an attempt to link Kilicdaroglu with the PKK. In a television interview, Erdoğan was asked about the footage. He replied that it did not matter whether it was manipulated or not, and insisted that the claim the video made was nevertheless true. Similarly, presidential spokesman İbrahim Kalın said "Video edited by a group of witty young people. The elements put together in the video are real". Kılıçdaroğlu called Erdoğan "fraudulent video fabricator". Kılıçdaroğlu also filed a 1 million TRY non-pecuniary damage lawsuit against Erdoğan through his lawyer Celal Çelik. On 25 May, the Ankara 6th Criminal Court of Peace blocked access to a troll account that shared fake footage used by Erdoğan during the election process, on the grounds that it "attacks personal rights".

An allegedly fake sex video purporting to portray Muharrem İnce was circulated before he dropped out of the race. İnce claimed that deepfake technology had been used to make the video and stated he had suffered "character assassination" and blamed the country's journalists and public prosecutors for not protecting him from the "fury of slander". Erdoğan phoned İnce to express his support and condemned the video, calling the video "Gülenist tactics" as seen in the past.

=== Block of Ekşi Sözlük ===
One day before the election, the website Ekşi Sözlük was blocked from access reasoned as "for the protection of national security and public order".

=== Twitter censorship ===
On the eve of the election, Elon Musk's Twitter restricted access within Turkey to accounts that were critical of Erdoğan at the request of the Turkish government.

=== Reporting of the results ===
On election night, the CHP complained about reports of Erdogan leading in the polls by the Anadolu Agency and produced its own numbers that held Kilicdaroglu as the leading candidate. After Ömer Çelik of the AKP accused the CHP of trying to seize the will of the nation, Ekrem İmamoğlu of the CHP justified the reports of the opposition as they had learned from the past. Anadolu is known to show the governing AKP as the leader with a large advantage in the first hours. The first results mainly come from smaller rural towns, where Erdogan and his AK party are generally popular.

There were also criticisms directed at the slow pace of counting ballots cast abroad. At the time of 90% of domestic ballots were counted, only 30.8% of ballots from abroad had been counted. Ahmet Yener of the Supreme Election Council said these delays were "normal" and that the increase in the number of ballots and contesting parties slowed counting.

The YSP demanded a repetition of the election for Gaziantep, where according to the YSP two thousand potential YSP voters were not able to vote as they were inscribed as members of the ballot committee by the Patriotic Party (VP) without informing them. The request was deemed an unreasonable objection by the provincial election presidency.

=== Azerbaijani and Russian interference allegations ===
A few days before the first round, Kılıçdaroğlu and the CHP accused Russia of foreign electoral interference, claiming it to be the source of many "plots, montages and deepfakes". The Russian Government rejected the claims.

After Oğan's endorsement of Erdoğan, journalist Demirağ claimed that Azerbaijani president Ilham Aliyev arranged the meeting between Erdoğan and Oğan. Istanbul Metropolitan Municipality assembly member, Good Party group deputy chairman İbrahim Özkan criticized Oğan, saying that "he [Oğan] will do whatever Aliyev says". Azerbaijani journalist Afgan Mukhtarli said that "pro-Aliyev media and trolls" campaigned against Kılıçdaroğlu, and adding that "Oğan has close relations with the Azerbaijani government", and that "Aliyev's role is certain in Oğan's decision". A journalist asked Oğan if he met with Aliyev before taking this decision. Upon the question Oğan said that his interlocutors are Erdoğan and Kılıçdaroğlu. On 23 May, Adil Aliyev, deputy chairman of the National Assembly of Azerbaijan, made a propaganda speech on behalf of the People's Alliance in Melekli district of Iğdır, Oğan's hometown.

== Opinion polls ==
=== First round ===
LOESS graph displaying the polls for the 2023 Turkish presidential election during the official campaign period.

=== Second round ===
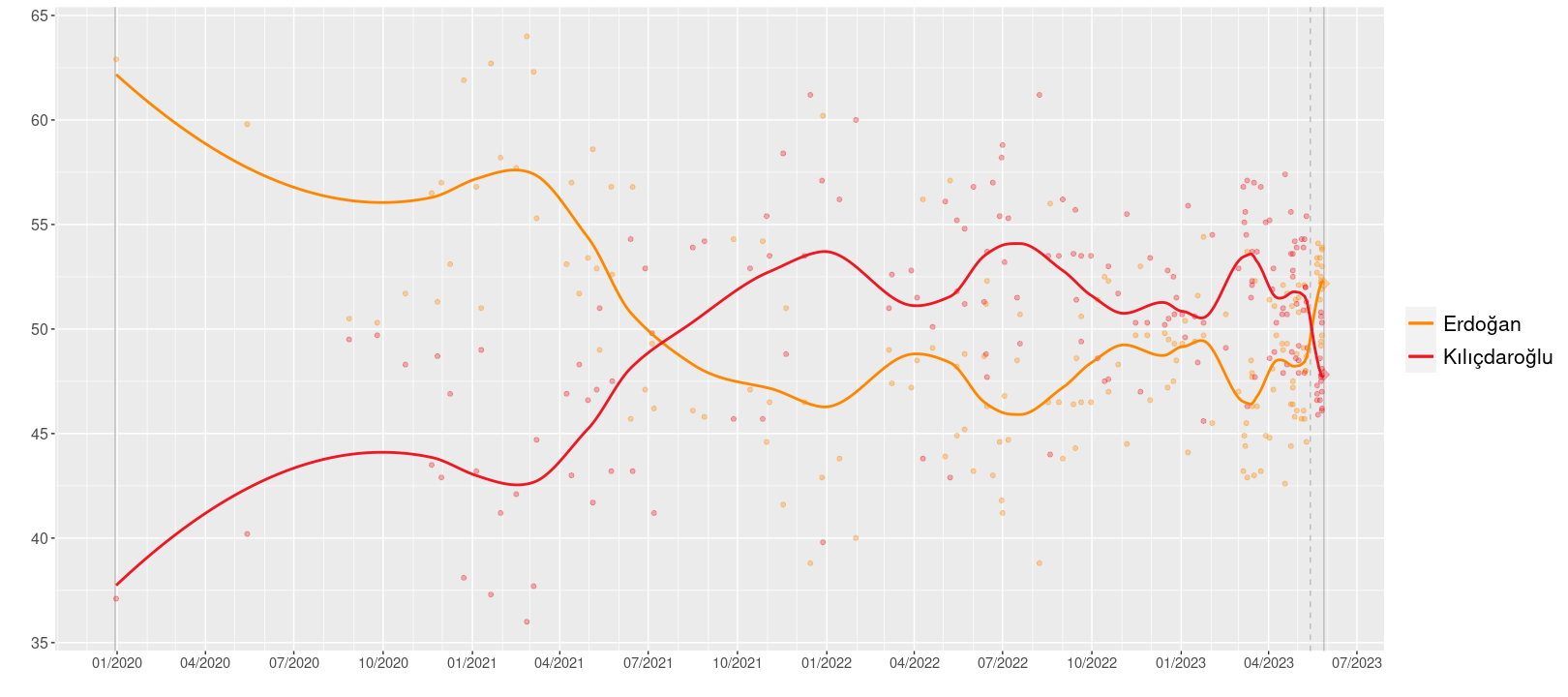

== Results ==
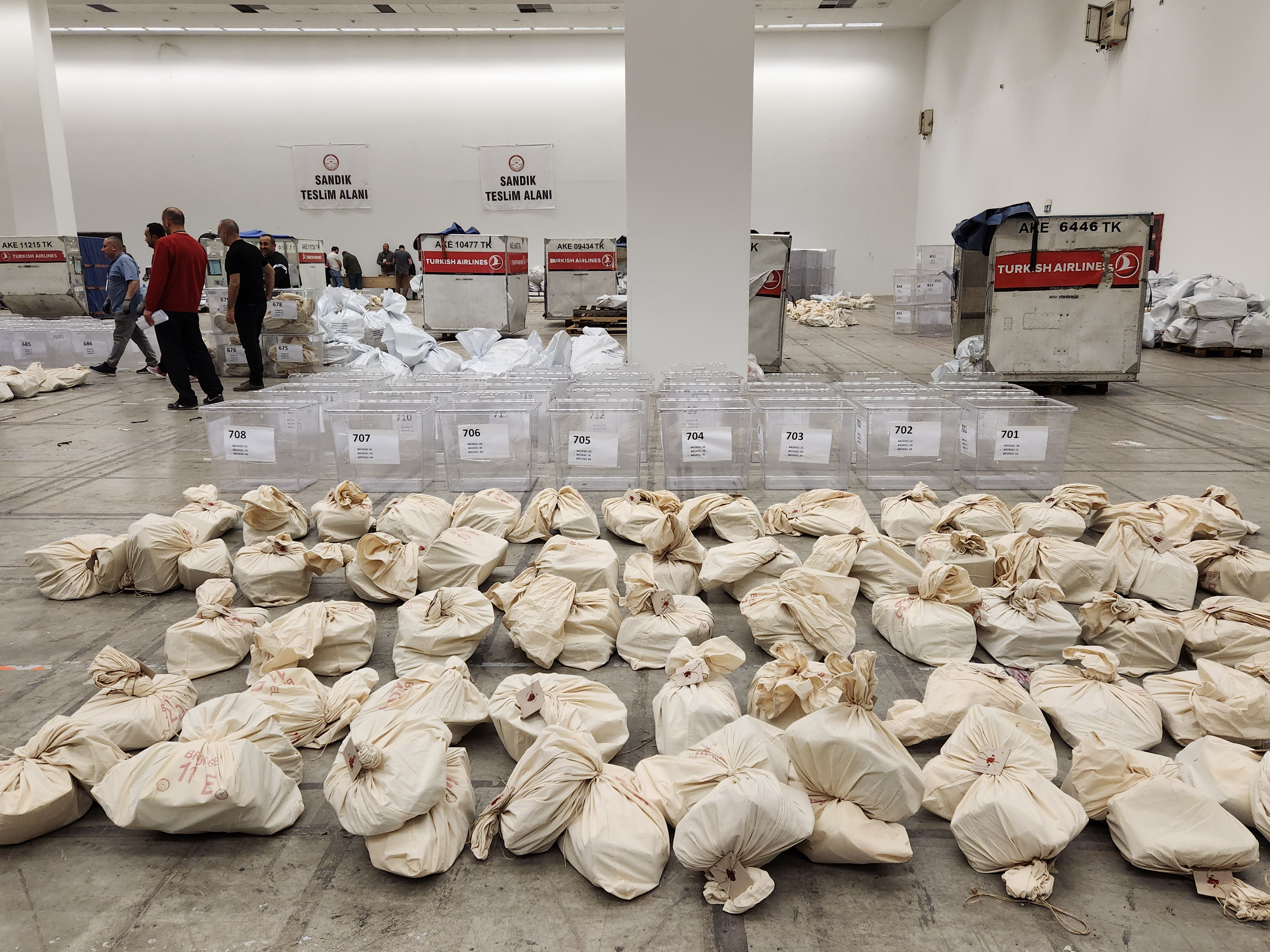
The ballot boxes used in the second round abroad were brought to Turkey

Recep Tayyip Erdoğan's vote share in the second round of the May 28, 2023 presidential election, by district.

Kemal Kılıçdaroğlu vote share in the second round of the 28 May 2023 presidential election, by district.

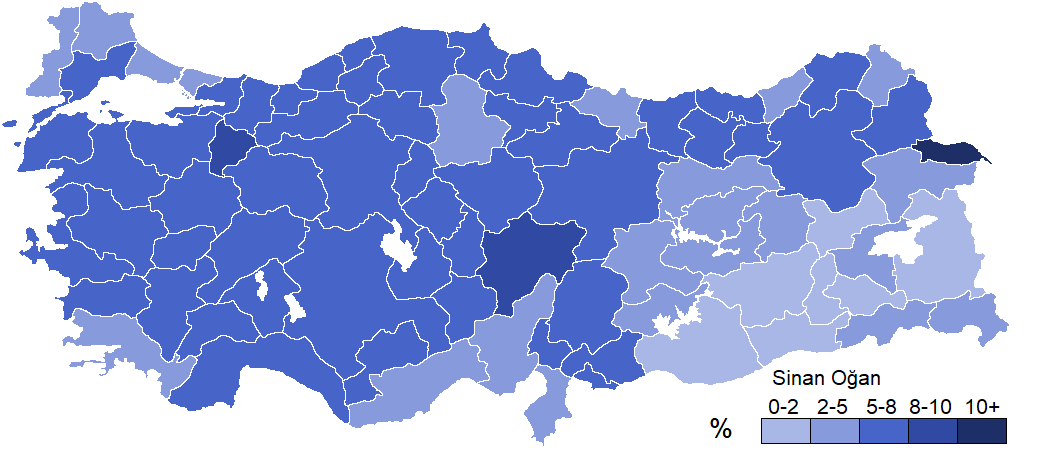
Results for Sinan Ogan from the first round, by province

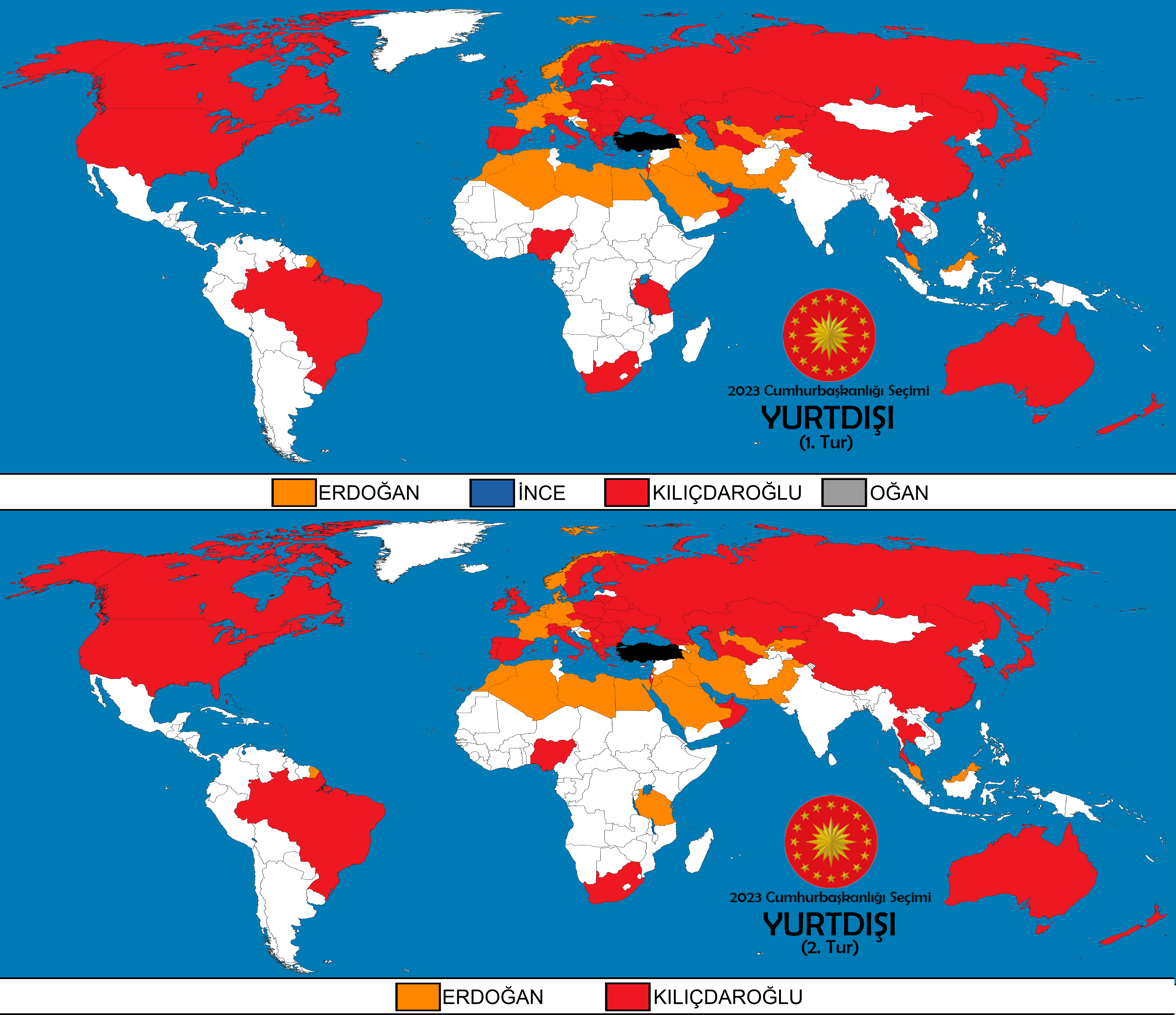
Results of voters abroad in the first and second rounds.

As no candidate was able to secure a majority of votes, a runoff took place between the top two finishers, Recep Tayyip Erdoğan and Kemal Kılıçdaroğlu, on 28 May. Erdoğan, the incumbent president coming into the election, received 49.52% of the vote, down from 52.59% in the last elections. Votes for Oğan pushed the race into a run-off. In the second round, the turnout rate in abroad and customs increased from 53.8% to 54.35%, and despite trailing in a dozen opinion polls prior to the first round of the election, the Supreme Election Council declared Erdoğan the winner after 99.4% of the votes were counted in the second round, as the remaining votes to be counted were unable to bridge the difference between him and Kılıçdaroğlu. Erdoğan received 52.18% of the vote.

Candidate	Party	First round		Second round	
Candidate	Party	Votes	%	Votes	%
Recep Tayyip Erdoğan	Justice and Development Party	27,133,849	49.52	27,834,589	52.18
Kemal Kılıçdaroğlu	Republican People's Party	24,595,178	44.88	25,504,724	47.82
Sinan Oğan	Independent	2,831,239	5.17		
Muharrem İnce	Homeland Party	235,783	0.43		
Total		54,796,049	100.00	53,339,313	100.00
Valid votes		54,796,049	98.14	53,339,313	98.73
Invalid/blank votes		1,037,104	1.86	684,288	1.27
Total votes		55,833,153	100.00	54,023,601	100.00
Registered voters/turnout		64,145,504	87.04	64,197,454	84.15
Source: YSK, 1st round; 2nd round

== Aftermath ==
=== Domestic ===
Erdoğan expressed his thanks to his supporters in a speech in Istanbul, saying that all 85 million citizens of the country were the "victors" in the elections, while taunting his opponent's defeat with the words "Bye, bye, bay Kemal" ("bay" means "mr." in Turkish and has the same pronunciation as "bye"). Kılıçdaroğlu conceded defeat, saying, "My real sadness is about difficulties awaiting this country." He vowed to continue fighting against Erdoğan. He urged his supporters to continue to fight to uphold democratic principles and expressed frustration at the massive influx of refugees in his country, commenting that "Turkish people have become second class citizens." Özdağ described the election results a pyrrhic victory. He also stated that Erdoğan won largely thanks to foreign voters, adding "the Victory Party is determined not to congratulate Erdoğan". The Ecumenical Patriarch, Bartholomew I sent a congratulatory message to the re-elected President.

In August 2023, Meral Akşener, leader of the Good Party, expressed regret for not having taken greater action to prevent the nomination of Kılıçdaroğlu, and apologized to the public for not enabling the nomination of two other popular candidates.

=== International ===
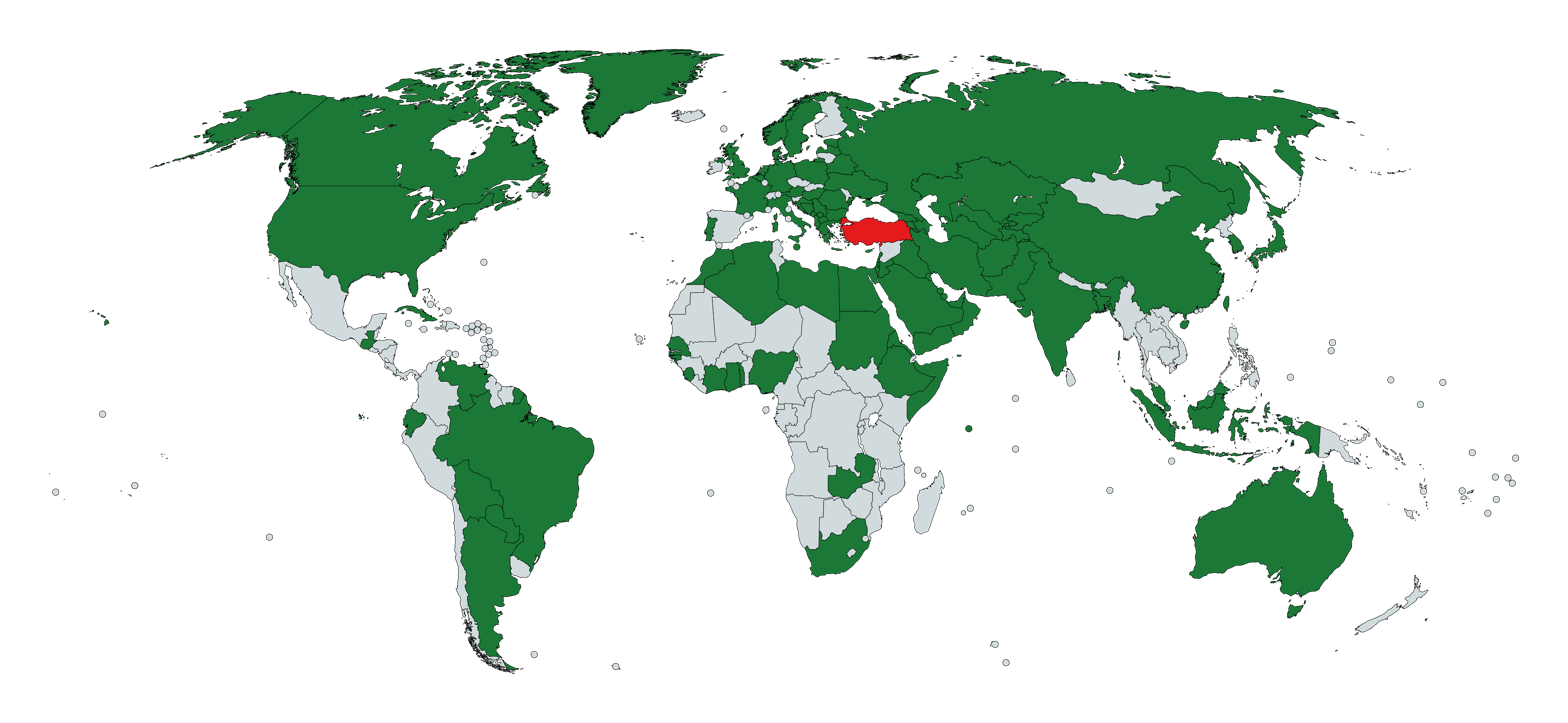
Map of the countries President Erdoğan of Turkey (in red) received congratulations from upon his re-election (in green)

International markets responded to Erdoğan's victory with concern; economists continued to worry about Erdoğan's abnormal economic policies and the Turkish lira fell to its lowest value in history. After Erdoğan was declared elected, President of the European Council Charles Michel congratulated Erdogan, stating that he "looks forward to working with you again to deepen EU-Turkey relations in the years to come." Kubanychbek Omuraliev, Secretary General of the Organization of Turkic States, said in a message, "I offer my sincere congratulations to President Erdogan for his victory in the 2nd round of the Presidential Elections of the Republic of Turkey, and wish him good luck for the Republic of Turkey, the brotherly Turkish people and the entire Turkic world." Organization of Islamic Cooperation (OIC) Secretary General Hissein Brahim Taha wished Erdoğan success in taking his country further and prosperous in his new term. NATO Secretary General Jens Stoltenberg congratulated Erdogan, stating that he "looks forward to continuing our work together and preparing for the NATO summit in July". UN chief António Guterres congratulated Turkish President Erdogan on his reelection.

== See also ==
- 2023 Turkish general election
- List of elections in 2023
- Politics of Turkey
- Third inauguration of Recep Tayyip Erdoğan
