= Afgan Mukhtarli =

Azerbaijani investigative journalist and activist

- Azerbaijani: Əfqan Muxtarlı
- Born: January 9, 1974 (age 52); Aşağı Tala, Azerbaijan SSR, USSR
- Occupations: journalist, human rights defender
- Awards: Pavel Sheremet Journalism Award (2017)

Afgan Mukhtarli (Azerbaijani: Əfqan Muxtarlı; born January 9, 1974) is an Azerbaijani journalist, human rights defender and a former political prisoner.

== Life and career ==
Afgan Mukhtarli worked for the "Yeni Musavat" Azerbaijani newspaper, collaborated with the independent news agency Meydan TV, the IWPR and OCCRP. The main topic of his work has been corruption in Azerbaijan. He became famous, among other things, thanks to a series of investigations exposing corruption in the Ministry of Defense of Azerbaijan.

In 2015, after receiving threats in Azerbaijan for their journalistic activities, Afgan Mukhtarli and his wife, journalist Leyla Mustafayeva, fled to Georgia, living in self-imposed exile and continuing their work in investigative journalism. After his abduction from Georgia and imprisonment in Azerbaijan, his wife Leyla and their daughter fled the country in October 2017 and received asylum in Germany.

In the recent years Mukhtarli has worked on investigations along the route of his abduction from Tbilisi to the Lagodekhi-Belakani section of the Georgian-Azerbaijani border, where he was handed over to the Azerbaijani side.

== Abduction and arrest ==
On May 29, 2017, Mukhtarli was abducted in Tbilisi, and a day later arrested in Azerbaijan. According to a Facebook post published by his colleague and independent investigative journalist Khadija Ismayilova, prior to his arrest Mukhtarli was investigating the property of Azerbaijan's ruling family in Georgia.

On January 12, 2018, he was sentenced to 6 years in prison on charges of illegal crossing of the state border, contraband and resistance against government officials. Through his lawyer Mukhtarli claimed that "he was kidnapped by men in Georgian police uniforms, who beat him in the car, put a hood on his head, stuffed his pockets with money and handed him over to Azeri state security officers. Georgian Prime Minister Giorgi Kvirikashvili categorically denied the involvement of any Georgian state bodies".

His abduction, arrest and subsequent conviction were strongly condemned by the US State Department, the European Parliament and international human rights organizations, such as Human Rights House Foundation, OpenDemocracy, European Federation of Journalists, Human Rights Watch and others. Amnesty International recognized him as a prisoner of conscience.

On March 17, 2020, under growing international pressure, in particular the proceedings before the European Court of Human Rights, he was released and extradited to Germany.

== Investigation of the Chief Prosecutor's Office of Georgia ==
In July 2017, Chief Prosecutor's Office of Georgia launched an investigation into the case of Afgan Mukhtarli under the first part of Article 143 of the Criminal Code of Georgia (illegal imprisonment).

According to Human Rights House in Tbilisi: "For various reasons, the investigation failed to gather objective evidence in the case, such as videotapes from Tbilisi to the Georgian-Azerbaijani border, that could have depicted the transportation of Mukhtarli. During the investigation, the heads of the State Security Service’s Counterintelligence Department and the Border Police of the Ministry of Internal Affairs have resigned, but their responsibility has not been yet investigated and the involvement of the Georgian authorities in the abduction case has not been properly studied to date, despite the high level of interest from society."

In 2021, the prosecutor's office granted Mukhtarli victim's status "which means legal recognition by the state that the journalist was definitely abducted from Tbilisi with the participation of several people."

== Awards ==
In 2017, Afgan Mukhtarli was awarded the Pavel Sheremet Journalism Award instituted by Eastern Partnership Civil Society Forum
