= Justice Party (Turkey, 2015) =

Minor political party in Turkey

Justice Party Adalet Partisi
- Leader: Vecdet Öz
- Founded: 9 October 2015
- Headquarters: Ankara, Turkey
- Membership (2026): ▼4,964
- Ideology: Kemalism; Ulusalism; Liberal conservatism; Social democracy; Pluralist democracy; Secularism; Parliamentarism; Progressivism
- Political position: Centre-right
- Colours: Red (official); Purple (customary)

Website
- www.ap.org.tr

The Justice Party (Turkish: Adalet Partisi, AP) is a liberal conservative political party in Turkey. The party is situated on the centre-right of the political spectrum, and considers itself a successor to the historical Justice Party of Süleyman Demirel, active from 1961 to 1981. The modern incarnation of the party was established on 9 October 2015 by Vecdet Öz, a former member of the centre-left Republican People's Party.

== History ==
=== Background ===
The Justice Party was established on 9 October 2015 as a spiritual successor to the historical party of the same name, which dominated the centre-right political space in Turkey throughout the 20-year period between the military coups in 1960 and 1980. The party's most prominent personality in this period was Süleyman Demirel, who served as prime minister four times while head of the Justice Party. Following the 1980 coup d'état, all Turkish political parties were closed down by the military regime, including the Justice Party and its traditional main rival, the Republican People's Party (CHP). The ban on these parties was eventually lifted, but whereas the CHP was ultimately re-constituted in 1992, the Justice Party had by then been supplanted by similar parties such as the Motherland Party (ANAP) and the True Path Party (DYP). The latter of these was later joined by Demirel himself, and held sway in Turkish politics throughout the 1990s, although its support gradually dwindled in this period. Finally, in the 2002 general elections, the DYP, along with the rest of the country's established parties, was swept out of the Turkish parliament after failing to cross the 10% electoral threshold, amidst growing economic turmoil and political instability. The election saw Recep Tayyip Erdoğan and his Islamic-rooted Justice and Development Party (AKP) come to power, sidelining the traditional centre-right parties. Over the following years, the DYP continued its gradual decline, and finally rebranded as the Democrat Party (DP) in 2007, with this party claiming the legacy of Demirel's parties as well as the historical Democrat Party of the 1940s and 50s.

=== Establishment and early years ===
The modern Justice Party was established by Vecdet Öz, a former academician and public health official in the Turkish government. Öz had previously contested the 2009 Turkish local elections as a mayoral candidate for the CHP in the Istanbul district of Beylikdüzü, but ultimately narrowly lost the race to Yusuf Uzun, the candidate of the AKP. Five years later, in the 2014 local elections, the Beylikdüzü mayoralty was won by Ekrem İmamoğlu, who in 2019 became mayor of the greater Istanbul Metropolitan Municipality and emerged as a prominent opposition profile. After having been a member of the CHP since 2009, Öz ultimately broke with the party and established the Justice Party as a moderate Kemalist party of the centre-right. It occupies roughly the same ideological space as the modern Democrat Party, and both of these parties claim the legacy of the original Justice Party of Süleyman Demirel. The party has positioned itself as an opposition party against the government of President Recep Tayyip Erdoğan, and it called for a "no" vote in the 2017 Turkish constitutional referendum arranged by his ruling AKP and the far-right Nationalist Movement Party, which sought to introduce an executive presidential system. The referendum ultimately passed, and in the snap 2018 presidential elections that followed, Öz sought to compete as an opposition candidate. However, he failed to collect the 100,000 signatures necessary to lodge a presidential candidacy, securing only 3,030 signatures.

=== Recent activities ===
After the 2018 elections, the Justice Party remained a minor political force in Turkey, and the party's electoral activities were largely limited to endorsements of candidates from larger parties. In the run-up to the 2023 general elections, however, the party announced that it would join the Ancestral Alliance, a coalition of small and largely nationalist political parties such as the Victory Party of Ümit Özdağ, a former MHP and Good Party member known for his anti-immigration views. For the presidential election, the alliance nominated Sinan Oğan, who succeeded in collecting the 100,000 signatures required to launch a candidacy. Meanwhile, the Justice Party ran in the parliamentary election with its own list, winning just 0.2% of the vote. However, Oğan secured over 5% of the vote in the first round of the presidential elections, above expectations and enough to force the election to a second round. In the runoff, Oğan endorsed the incumbent President of Turkey, Recep Tayyip Erdoğan, whilst both the Justice Party and the Victory Party instead endorsed his challenger, Kemal Kılıçdaroğlu of the CHP.

== Election results ==
=== Parliamentary elections ===
Grand National Assembly of Turkey
| Election | Votes | | Seats | | Role |
| Election | # | % | # | ± | Role |
|---|---|---|---|---|---|
| 2018 | Did not run | | 0 / 600 | New | in opposition |
| 2023 | 108,713 | 0.2 | 0 / 600 | 0 | in opposition |

=== Presidential elections ===
President of Turkey
| Election | Candidate | Votes (round 1) | | Votes (round 2) | | Result |
| Election | Candidate | # | % | # | % | Result |
|---|---|---|---|---|---|---|
| 2018 | Did not run | | | | | No |
| 2023 | Sinan Oğan (Note: Independent candidate running for the Ancestral Alliance.) | 2,831,239 | 5.2 | | | No |
