= 2023 Kemal Kılıçdaroğlu presidential campaign =

Presidential campaign

Kemal Kılıçdaroğlu for President
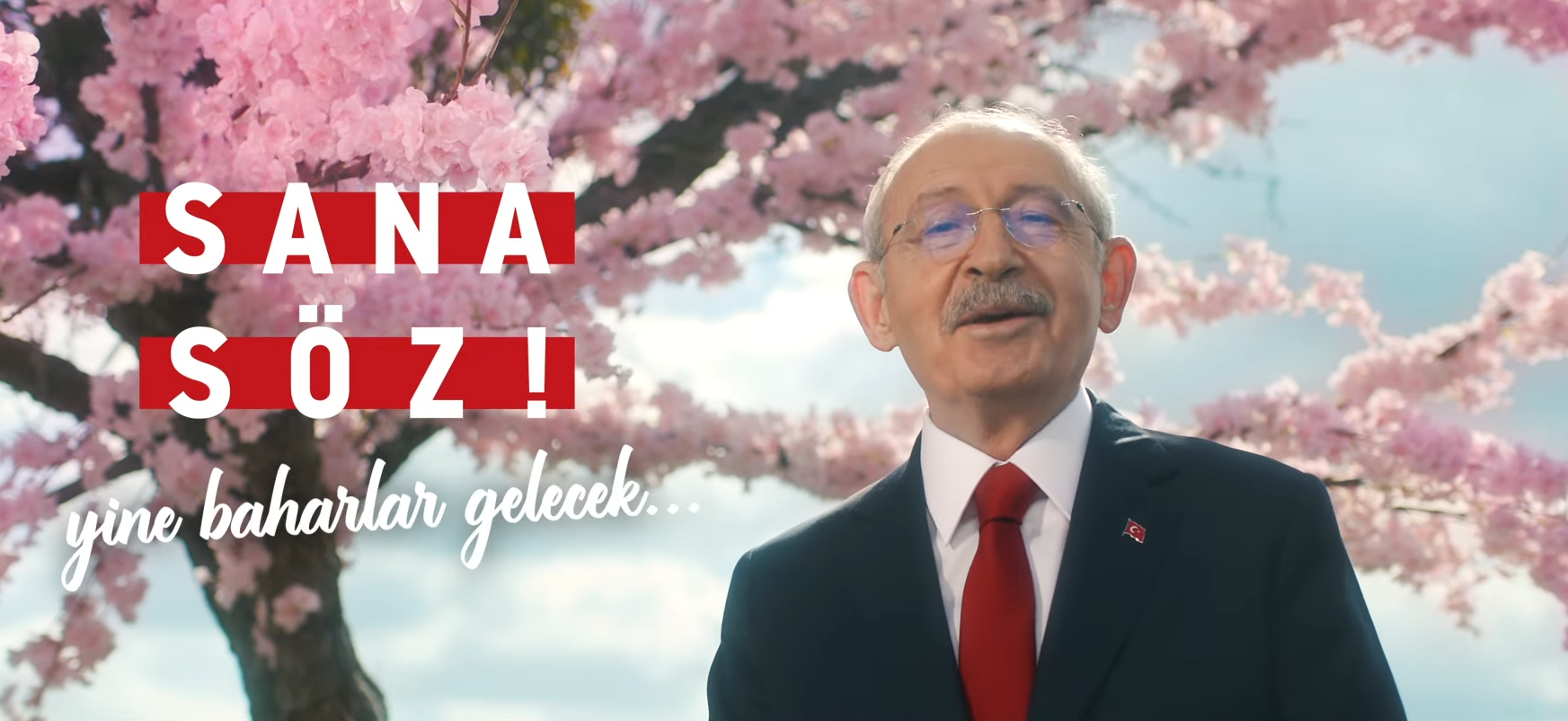
- Campaign: 2023 Turkish presidential election
- Candidate: Kemal Kılıçdaroğlu; Incumbent Leader of the Main Opposition (2010–2023); Leader of the Republican People's Party (2010–2023); Member of the Grand National Assembly (2002–2023); Vice President of the Socialist International (2012–2014)
- Affiliation: Republican People's Party and Nation Alliance
- Status: Official nominee: 6 March 2023
- Slogan(s): 1st round: Sana söz, yine baharlar gelecek (Promise to you, spring will come again); 2nd round: Türkiye için karar ver! (Decide for Turkey)

Kemal Kılıçdaroğlu, leader of the Republican People's Party and İzmir deputy, became the joint presidential candidate of the Nation Alliance for the 2023 Turkish presidential election. He held a narrow lead in most poll aggregations, but nevertheless lost to incumbent President Recep Tayyip Erdoğan.

== Background ==
Kemal Kılıçdaroğlu, who was elected as the leader of the Republican People's Party in 2010, did not run for the presidency in the 2014 and 2018 elections. He hinted for the first time that he could run for the presidency in the 2023 election during the budget discussions in the Turkish Grand National Assembly in December 2020. Later, he made other statements stating that he could be a candidate on different dates. For Ekrem İmamoğlu and Mansur Yavaş, the mayors of Istanbul and Ankara, who are among the possible candidates of the CHP, Kılıçdaroğlu's statement that they should continue their duties and their support for Kılıçdaroğlu paved the way for Kılıçdaroğlu's candidacy.

Later it was announced that İmamoğlu would become vice president responsible for disaster preparedness and urban planning tasks, while Yavaş would be responsible for social policies such as poverty alleviation and development.

The Table of Six, formed by the expansion of the Nation Alliance, discussed the joint presidential candidate for the first time at its 11th meeting on 26 January 2023. While the joint candidate was scheduled to be announced on 13 February, the nomination process was postponed due to the 2023 Turkey–Syria earthquake on 6 February that affected 11 provinces. At the Table of Six meeting on 2 March, it was announced that a consensus was reached on the joint candidate and the candidate would be announced on March 6. Upon the Good Party's General Administrative Board's opposition to Kılıçdaroğlu's candidacy, Chairwoman Meral Akşener called for candidacy for İmamoğlu and Yavaş. İmamoğlu and Yavaş responded negatively to this call and declared their support for the candidacy of Kılıçdaroğlu. Eventually, the Good Party supported Kılıçdaroğlu's candidacy in exchange for İmamoğlu and Yavaş being the vice president along with the five leaders of the Table of Six, and after the Table meeting on 6 March, Kılıçdaroğlu was announced as the joint candidate.

=== Endorsement ===
On the 28 April 2023, the Labor and Freedom Alliance that includes the parties Workers' Party of Turkey (TİP), the Green Left Party (YSP), Peoples' Democratic Party (HDP) and the Socialist Party of the Oppressed (ESP) officially announced their support for Kemal Kılıçdaroğlu after they already had declined to file their own presidential candidate before. For the second round the far-right Ümit Özdag also supported Kılıçdaroğlu after his ATA alliance came in third in the first round. Following Özdags endorsement, there were some concerns over the sustained support of the Kurdish opposition as the endorsement included an agreement over the imposition on state officials in the case local administrators were proven to have supported terrorism, which was what happened to many mayors of the HDP. But the YSP renewed their support for Kılıçdaroğlu, as Erdogan represented a "one-man-regime" that should be changed.

== Campaign ==
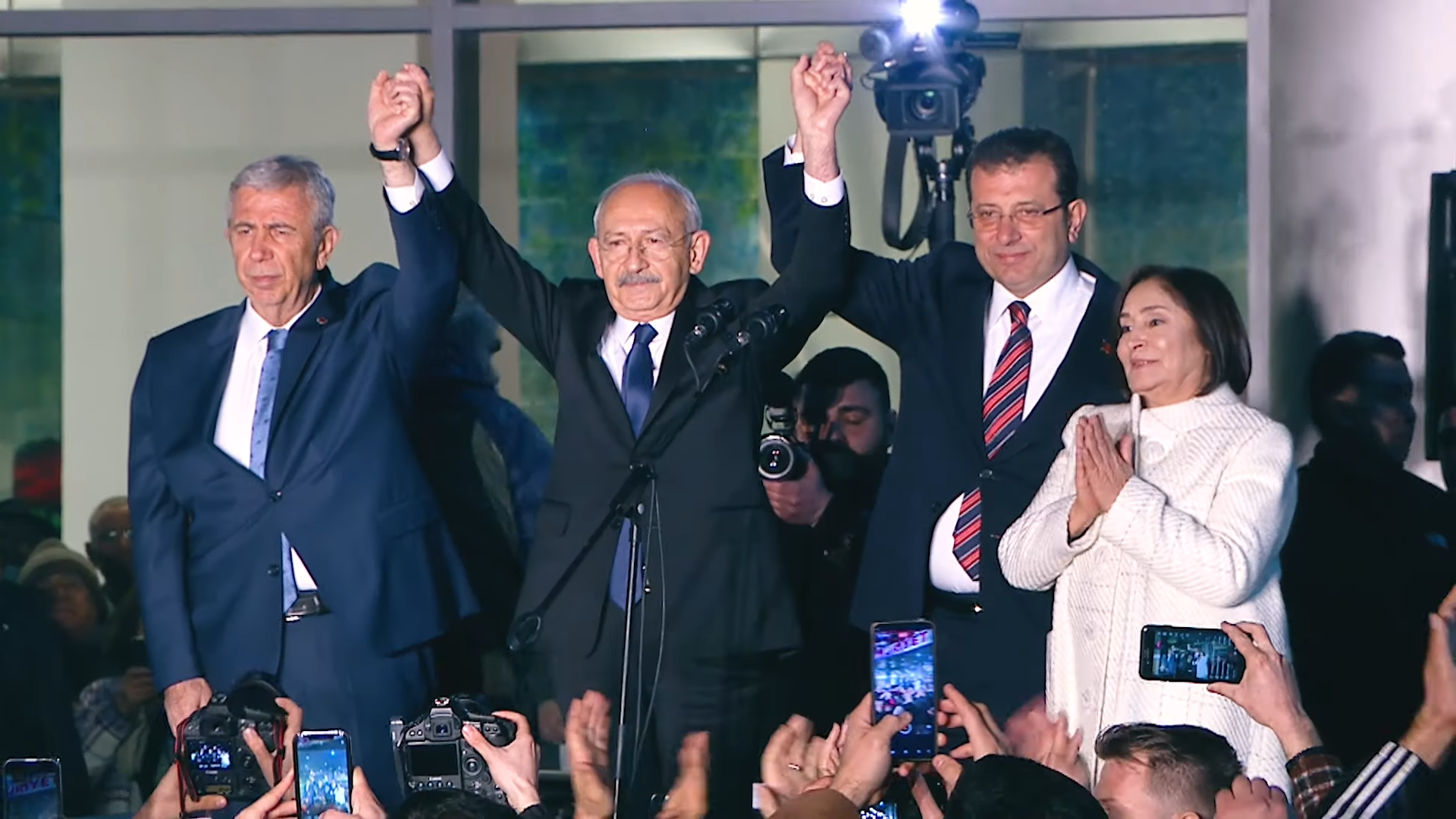
Ankara mayor Mansur Yavaş, Istanbul mayor Ekrem İmamoğlu, Kemal Kılıçdaroğlu and his wife Selvi Kılıçdaroğlu

After it was announced that he was the joint candidate of the Nation Alliance, Kılıçdaroğlu made a speech in front of the CHP Headquarters. On 7 March, at the parliamentary group meeting, the party announced that he was leaving the group presidency. On 10 March, Kılıçdaroğlu went to the earthquake zone, visited Malatya and Kahramanmaraş, and spent the night in a tent in Nurhak. The candidacy launch, which was planned to be held on 12 March, was postponed as it had not been forty days since the earthquake. On the same day, a video containing sections of Kılıçdaroğlu's speeches was shared from the official social media accounts of the CHP. Kılıçdaroğlu held the first meeting in Hatay on 14 March after he left the group presidency. He went to Şanlıurfa, where there was a flood on 15 March. He went to Northern Cyprus on 16 March and visited the families of Cypriot students who died in the Kahramanmaraş earthquakes. Kılıçdaroğlu, who met with the Workers' Party of Turkey and the Left Party three days before the announcement of his candidacy, announced that he would meet on 17 March in the Independent Turkey Party and the National Road Party.

On 27 March, CHP uploaded a video titled "Sana söz, yine baharlar gelecek" to their YouTube channel, officially starting the presidential campaign. The campaign film used an adaptation of Paco de Lucía's song "Palenque", performed as "Tuana" by Levent Yüksel in Turkish. One of his main campaign aim is to return to the parliamentary democracy that was in place before the presidential system.

=== Presidential palace ===
Kemal Kılıçdaroğlu declared that if elected he would move the presidential palace from the Presidential Complex back to the Cankaya Mansion where it was before. In letter to a journalist of the newspaper Sözcü, he announced that he would come up for the private residential bills as for gas or electricity with his salary.

=== Insulting the President law ===
He vowed to abolish Art.299 of the Turkish Penal Code, which prohibits to insult the Turkish president for which over a hundred thousand people have been investigated during Erdogan's presidency.

=== On religion ===
In a campaign tweet, which was to become the most viewed Turkish tweet in history, Kılıçdaroğlu approached the electorate with his Alevi Muslim faith. His Alevi faith was one the points which lead some politicians from the Good Party to oppose Kılıçdaroğlu's candidacy, thinking that the conservative electorate would render a candidate with Alevi faith unelectable. The opposition outlet Duvar called it a historic speech, while a commentator from the Brookings Institution labeled it a political taboo-breaking courageous video. Selahattin Demirtaş of the HDP lauded and supported the message, while the Sunni former Prime Minister Ahmet Davutoğlu from the Future Party (GP) supported Kılıçdaroğlu's tweet with his own tweet, in which he encouraged greater Sunni-Alevi understanding.

=== Atatürk Airport ===
Kemal Kılıçdaroğlu lamented the fact that the Atatürk Airport has been shut to civil aircraft in 2019 after the inauguration of the Istanbul Airport and vowed to turn Atatürk Airport into an aviation centre if elected. With the help of Fatih and Eren Özmen, the owners of the Sierra Nevada Corporation, Kılıçdaroğlu hopes Turkey will be able to develop its own space shuttles.

=== Education system ===
Kılıçdaroğlu has claimed that education has been one of the worst aspects of Erdoğan's premiership and presidency, and vowed to rid the Ministry of Education of what he argues is 'political influence', turning it into an institution somewhat independent of the state.

=== Media ===
Kılıçdaroğlu often turned to social media when campaigning and tweeted videos from his home. His contender Erdogan holds a firm control over the media and until the 2 May 2023, the state-run broadcaster TRT aired about 32 hours of his rivals campaign while to the campaign of Kılıçdaroğlu 32 minutes where allocated. After a widely viewed YouTube broadcast in which Kılıçdaroğlu answered questions to people also critical to him in the main square in Bursa, any further screenings were banned as they were deemed as a defamation by Erdogan's AKP.

== Rallies ==
Date	District	Province	Speakers (in order)	Ref
30 April	Konak	İzmir		
6 May	Maltepe	Istanbul	Karamollaoğlu, Yavaş, İmamoğlu, Babacan, Uysal, Davutoğlu, Akşener, Kılıçdaroğlu	
10 May	Rize	Rize	İmamoğlu	
12 May		Samsun	Kılıçdaroğlu, İmamoğlu, Karamollaoğlu and Davutoğlu.	
12 May		Ankara	Yavaş, Babacan, Akşener, Karamollaoğlu, İmamoğlu, Uysal, Davutoğlu and Kılıçdaroğlu	

Kemal Kılıçdaroğluvote share in the second round of the 28 May 2023 presidential election, by district.
