= Ancestral Alliance =

Turkish electoral alliance

Ancestral Alliance ATA İttifakı
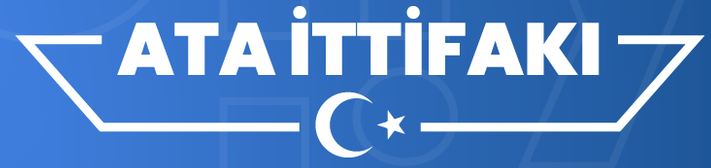
- Presidential candidate: Sinan Oğan
- Founded: 11 March 2023
- Dissolved: 22 May 2023
- Ideology: Kemalism; Ultranationalism; National conservatism; Anti-immigration; Parliamentarism
- Political position: Right-wing to far-right
- Member parties: Victory Party; Justice Party; My Country Party; Turkey Alliance Party
- Colors: Grey

Ancestral Alliance or Ancestor Alliance (Turkish: Ata İttifakı), stylized as ATA Alliance, was a right-wing electoral alliance in Turkey that was established on 11 March 2023 and consisted of the Victory Party, the Justice Party, the My Country Party and the Turkey Alliance Party. The candidate it has chosen for the 2023 Turkish presidential election is Sinan Oğan, a former Nationalist Movement Party deputy. The True Party left the alliance after Oğan was nominated as candidate.

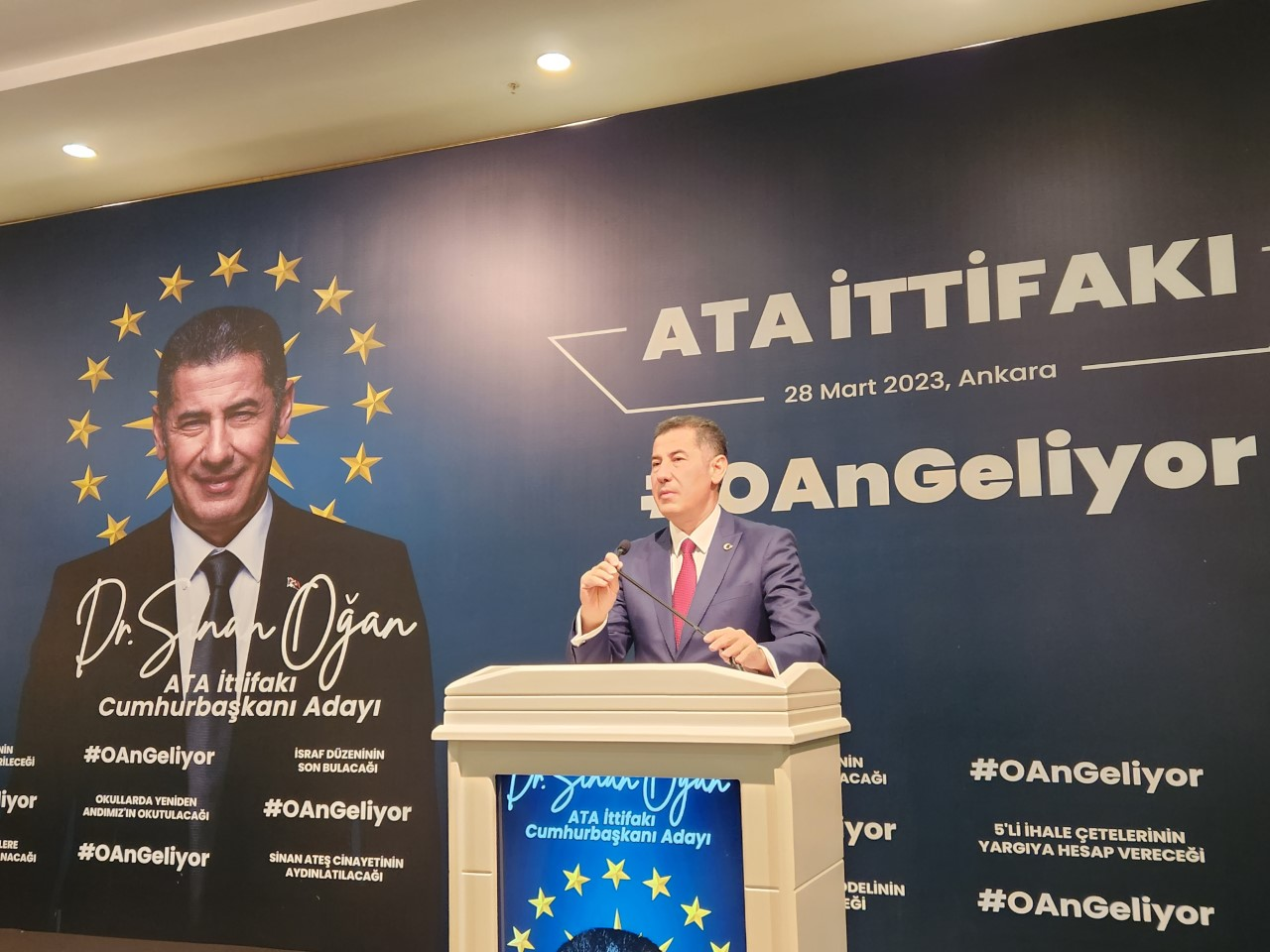
The presidential candidate of the Ancestral Alliance, Sinan Oğan

== History ==
=== Establishment ===
In June 2022, it was suggested that a new alliance of five parties, including the Victory Party, would be formed Ümit Özdağ said about those allegations, "There is no such thing. I am not in preparation for an alliance". In the following days, the Chairman of the Homeland Party Muharrem İnce, the Chairman of the Victory Party Ümit Özdağ, the Chairman of the Justice Party Vecdet Öz and the Chairman of the True Party Rifat Serdaroğlu made statements that they were in talks about the electoral alliance.

=== Proclamation ===
The declaration of the Ancestor Alliance, consisting of the Victory Party, Justice Party, My Country Party and the Turkey Alliance Party, took place on 11 March 2023 at the Victory Party headquarters, where it was announced that the candidate it had chosen for the 2023 Turkish presidential election was Sinan Oğan, a former Nationalist Movement Party deputy.

Upon the nomination of Sinan Oğan, the True Party announced that it left the alliance shortly before the announcement. The Right Party chairman, Rifat Serdaroğlu, stated, "We believe that nominating a third presidential candidate will serve the People's Alliance".

=== Dissolution ===
On 21 May 2023, due to disagreements in whom to support in the second round of the presidential elections, the Justice Party leader Vecdet Öz announced that "the alliance has officially ended", and announced his support for Kemal Kılıçdaroğlu in the second round. Presidential nominee Sinan Oğan announced he would support Recep Tayyip Erdoğan. On 24 May, the Victory Party leader Ümit Özdağ announced his support for Kılıçdaroğlu in the second round.

== Members ==
Party		Leader	Ideology	MPs (Grand National Assembly)
ZP	Victory Party; Zafer Partisi	Ümit Özdağ	Anti-immigration	0 / 600
AP	Justice Party; Adalet Partisi	Vecdet Öz	Liberal conservatism	0 / 600
ÜLKEM	My Country Party; Ülkem Partisi	Neşet Doğan	Kemalism	0 / 600
TÜİP	Turkey Alliance Party; Türkiye İttifakı Partisi	Mehmet Sağlam	Progressivism	0 / 600

== Electoral performance ==
=== Parliamentary elections ===
Election	Parties	Votes			Seats		Position
Election	Parties	#	%	Rank	#	±	Position
2023	Justice Party; Victory Party	1,323,893	2.43	4th	0 / 600	new	Extra-parliamentary opposition

=== Presidential elections ===
Election	Candidate	Votes	%	Outcome	Map
2023	Sinan Oğan	2,831,208	5.17%	3rd	
