= Sinan Oğan =

Turkish politician (born 1967)

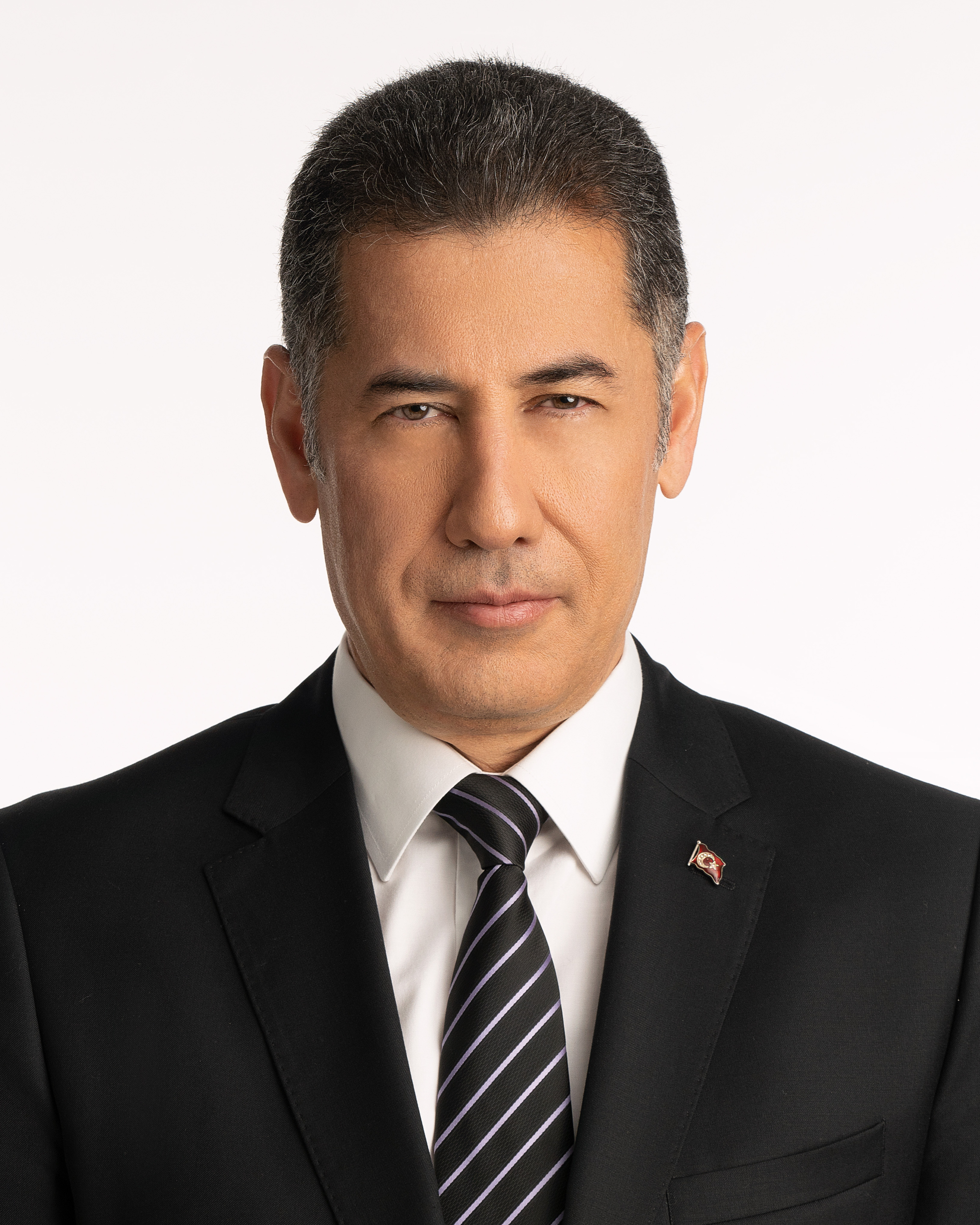

Member of the Grand National Assembly
- In office 12 June 2011 – 7 June 2015
- Constituency: Iğdır (2011)

Personal details
- Born: 14 March 1969 (age 57) Iğdır, Turkey
- Party: Independent (2017–present)
- Other political affiliations: Nationalist Movement Party (2011–2017) (Note: In August 2015, Oğan was expelled from the party by the MHP disciplinary board, however he returned to the party in November 2015 with annulment of the decision by a court.)
- Spouse: Gökçen Oğan (m. 2000)
- Children: 2
- Education: Marmara University; Moscow State Institute of International Relations

Sinan Oğan (born 14 March 1969) is a Turkish politician who won a seat in the Turkish parliament in 2011 with the far-right Nationalist Movement Party (MHP). He was the presidential candidate of ATA Alliance for the 2023 Turkish presidential election, which resulted in a second round. He finished in third place, therefore he was described as a potential kingmaker. He proceeded to support the People's Alliance candidate Recep Tayyip Erdoğan, who was subsequently elected president in the second round of the election.

== Early life and education ==
Oğan was born on 14 March 1969 in Iğdır, Turkey, in a family of Azerbaijani ethnicity. He graduated from the Department of Management at Marmara University in 1989. From 1993 to 2000 Oğan worked as deputy dean at the Azerbaijan State Economic University. From 1994 to 1998, he also served as a representative of the Turkish International Cooperation and Development Agency (TİKA) of the Turkish Ministry of Foreign Affairs in an additional mission.

== Professional career ==
In 2000, he returned to Turkey and started working at the Center for Eurasian Strategic Studies on the Caucasus region. He laid the foundation for the Center of International Relations and Strategic Analysis TURKSAM. Oğan's books include 'Azerbaijan', which was published by Turkic World Research Foundation Publications in 1992, 'Politics and Oligarchy', published in Russia in 2003, and 'Orange Revolutions', published in 2006. He has also published more than 500 articles and analyses. In 2009, Oğan obtained a PhD in international relations and political science from the Moscow State Institute of International Relations.

== Political career ==
He was elected as Iğdır deputy from the Nationalist Movement Party in the 2011 Turkish general elections. He was a member of the Turkey-Albania and Türkiye-Niger Parliamentary Friendship Groups and the Secretary General of the Turkey-Azerbaijan Parliamentary Friendship Group.

He was expelled from the Nationalist Movement Party on 26 August 2015, but won a lawsuit and returned to the party, only to be expelled again on 2 November 2015. He returned to the party as a member in 2016.

Oğan organized opposition to the 2017 Turkish constitutional referendum resulting in his final expulsion from the Nationalist Movement Party. Prior to this, he was a challenger against Devlet Bahceli, leader of the MHP, where an internal revolt had occurred due to the party's poor showing in the November 2015 Turkish general election. Oğan argued that the MHP platform was against "constitutional change" and campaigned against Bahceli's support for the referendum. Oğan was subject to an alleged assassination attempt after his expulsion from the party, though the district governor of Samsun Province disputed this claim.

=== 2023 presidential election ===
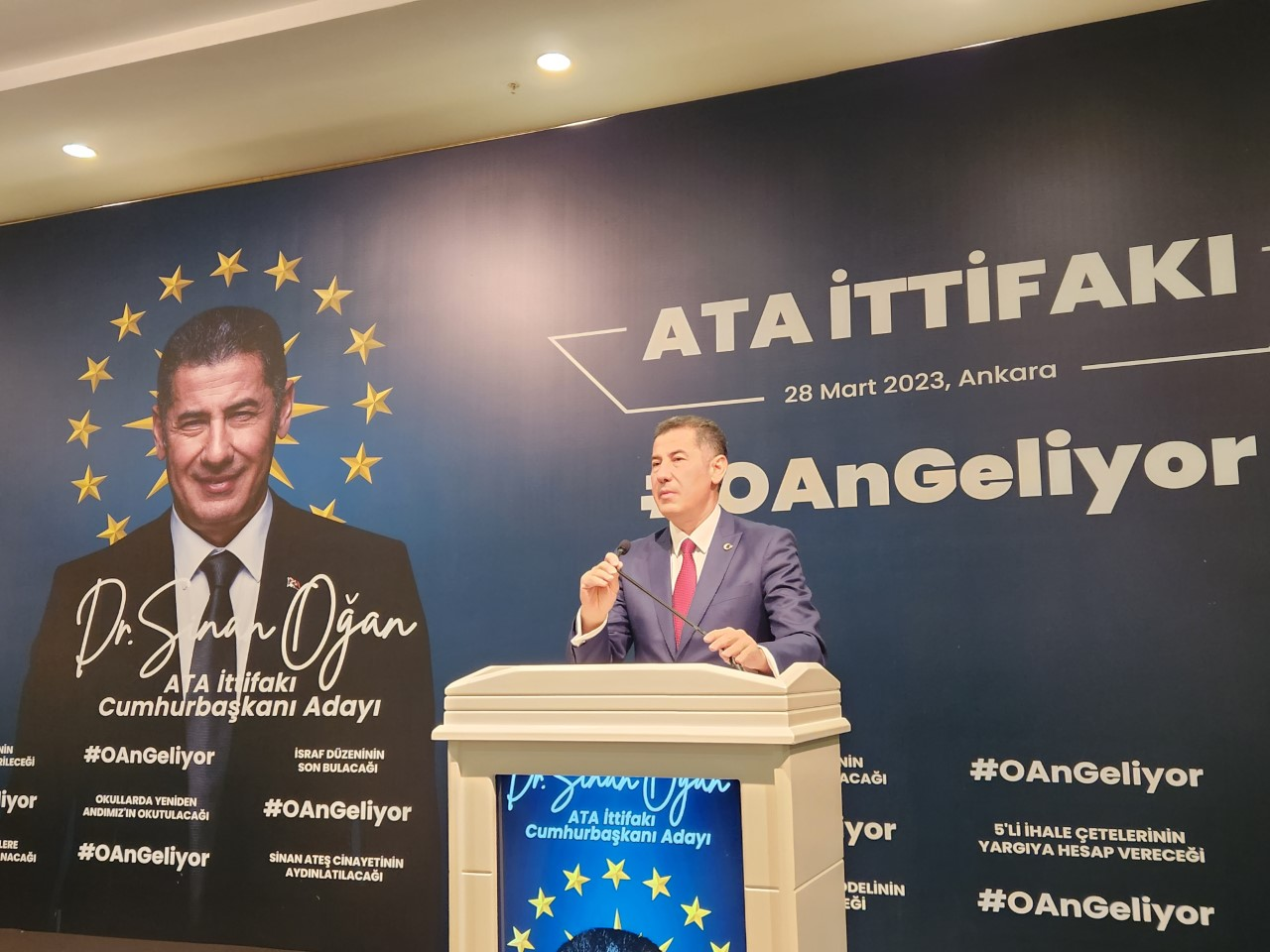
Sinan Oğan launching his campaign

He was nominated as the ATA Alliance candidate for the 2023 Turkish presidential election, acquiring the necessary 100,000 signatures to stand on 26 March 2023. He had 5.17% votes and ended the election in the 3rd place. On 22 May 2023, Oğan declared that he would support People's Alliance and Recep Tayyip Erdoğan in the runoff election, citing "stability" concerns rising from Erdoğan's parliamentary majority. One day before the announcement, the Justice Party leader Vecdet Öz announced that ATA Alliance has officially ended. After Erdoğan won in the runoff, Oğan was present next to Erdoğan during his balcony speech.

== Personal life ==
Oğan is married and has two children. His father-in-law is Mehmet Ekici who served as the deputy chairman of the Nationalist Movement Party until 2011 when he had to resign from the party due to his involvement in a scandal. Aside from being a native Turkish speaker, Oğan has knowledge of English and Russian.

== Awards and recognition ==
- 1992 Milliyet Newspaper Social Sciences Award
- 1993 Marmara University Academic Award of Excellence
- Turkic World Service Award from Eurasia Economic Relations Association
- Honor Award from the Federation of Oghuz Tribe Cultural Associations
- 2011, he was awarded the Azerbaijan State Medal.
- 2011 "Member of the Parliament (MP) of the Year" by the Telecommunication Workers Association

== Electoral history ==
=== Parliamentary ===
Election	Constituency	Party	Votes			Seats	Elected
Election	Constituency	Party	#	%	Rank	Seats	Elected
2011	Iğdır	Nationalist Movement Party	27,554	34,09%	1st	1 / 2	Yes

=== Presidential ===
Election	Votes	%	Outcome	Map
2023	2,831,208	5.17%	3rd	

== See also ==
- 2016 Nationalist Movement Party Extraordinary Congress
- Ümit Özdağ
- Sinan Oğan 2023 presidential campaign
