= Homeland Party (Turkey, 2021) =

Memleket Partisi Memleket Partisi
- Abbreviation: Memleket (official)
- Chairperson: Asuman Ali Güven (acting)
- Secretary: Halil İlker Çelik
- Founder: Muharrem İnce
- Founded: 4 September 2020 (as a movement)
- Registered: 17 May 2021 (as a party)
- Dissolved: 22 July 2025
- Split from: Republican People's Party
- Merged into: Republican People's Party
- Headquarters: Çankaya, Ankara
- Membership (2025): ▼55,554
- Ideology: Kemalism; Pro-Europeanism; Populism; Ulusalism (alleged)
- Colours: Blue; Light blue
- Slogan: (MAVİ); Homeland, Justice, Conscience, and Jobs for the jobless!
- Grand National Assembly: 0 / 600
- Provincial councillors: 0 / 1,282
- Municipal assemblies: 10 / 20,952

Website
- memleketpartisi.org.tr

The Homeland Party (Turkish: Memleket Partisi) was a political party in Turkey, founded in May 2021 by Muharrem İnce, the former candidate of the Republican People's Party (CHP) in the 2018 Turkish presidential election. It has dissolved itself in July 2025.

The party originated as a social movement (Homeland Movement) in September 2020, two years after the election. It split from the CHP after İnce failed to unseat serving CHP leader Kemal Kılıçdaroğlu from his position. İnce was also encouraged to establish a party during his Homeland Movement campaign.

The party was largely seen as a protest movement against the established CHP leadership, which had refused to resign despite consecutive election losses and has been accused by İnce of straying from the CHP's core Kemalist values. One of the party's slogans is "Neither from the right nor from the left, but in the way of Atatürk".

== History ==
=== Homeland Movement ===
The Homeland Movement was founded by Muharrem İnce in Sivas on 4 September 2020, marking the anniversary of the Sivas Congress, with the motto of "The Homeland Movement In a Thousand Days (Bin Günde Memleket Hareketi)". İnce stated that the aim of the movement during its foundation as "...not an intraparty opposition movement, we are offering an alternative to Turkey. Turkey needs to reunite and share. The name of the movement that we started today is 'Homeland Within 1000 Days' movement."

=== Partification ===
Muharrem İnce, on 8 December 2020, stated that he would leave the CHP, which he had been a member of since 1992, and that the Homeland Movement would be registered as a political party. The name and logo of the party would be made public by himself at a press conference in the future. İnce started a three-day preseason training in Nevşehir on 25 January 2021 with a team that consisted of 80 people, and said: "We have unanimously accepted our party constitution".

Muharrem İnce said that the party's foundation application would be given to the Ministry of Interior in April 2021. It was eventually provided earlier than expected on 17 May, at which time the party was officially established. Upon establishment, three CHP members of the Parliament joined the party. One of them resigned later from the party and became independent. The party sought to gain support from CHP's constituencies, especially followers of ulusalcılık within the party.

In February 2023, Muharrem İnce announced that the Homeland Party is discussing an electoral alliance with the Democratic Left Party, the Victory Party, True Party and the Justice Party for the 2023 Turkish general election.

On 6 March 2023, Muharrem İnce left the four-party alliance negotiations by sending a message to their WhatsApp group.

== Election results ==
=== General elections ===
Election	Share	Seats	Leader
2023	0.92%	0 / 600	Muharrem İnce
