= 2024 Kütahya mayoral election =

2024 Mayoral elections in the Turkish province of Kütahya

- 31 March 2024

Part of the 2024 Turkish local elections
Candidate	Eyüp Kahveci	Alim Işık	Kamil Saraçoğlu
Party	CHP	MHP	AK Party
Alliance	N/A	People's Alliance	People's Alliance
Popular vote	40,712	40,110	37,992
Percentage	29.69%	29.25%	27.70%

Mayoral elections were held in the Turkish province of Kütahya as part of nationwide local elections on 31 March 2024.

Despite being considered a conservative province, the election in the central district of Kütahya resulted in a surprise victory for the secular centre-left Republican People's Party (CHP), which narrowly won against the incumbent nationalist Nationalist Movement Party (MHP).

The results were largely attributed to a split in the right wing vote, with the MHP taking 29.25%, the Justice and Development Party taking 27.70% and the Islamist conservative New Welfare Party (YRP) taking 8.07%. Had these parties entered the election in an alliance, their hypothetical joint candidate could have get about 65% of the vote.
