= 2024 Istanbul mayoral election =

Turkish municipal election

2024 Istanbul mayoral elections
- 31 March 2024; Part of the 2024 Turkish local elections
- Metropolitan Municipality
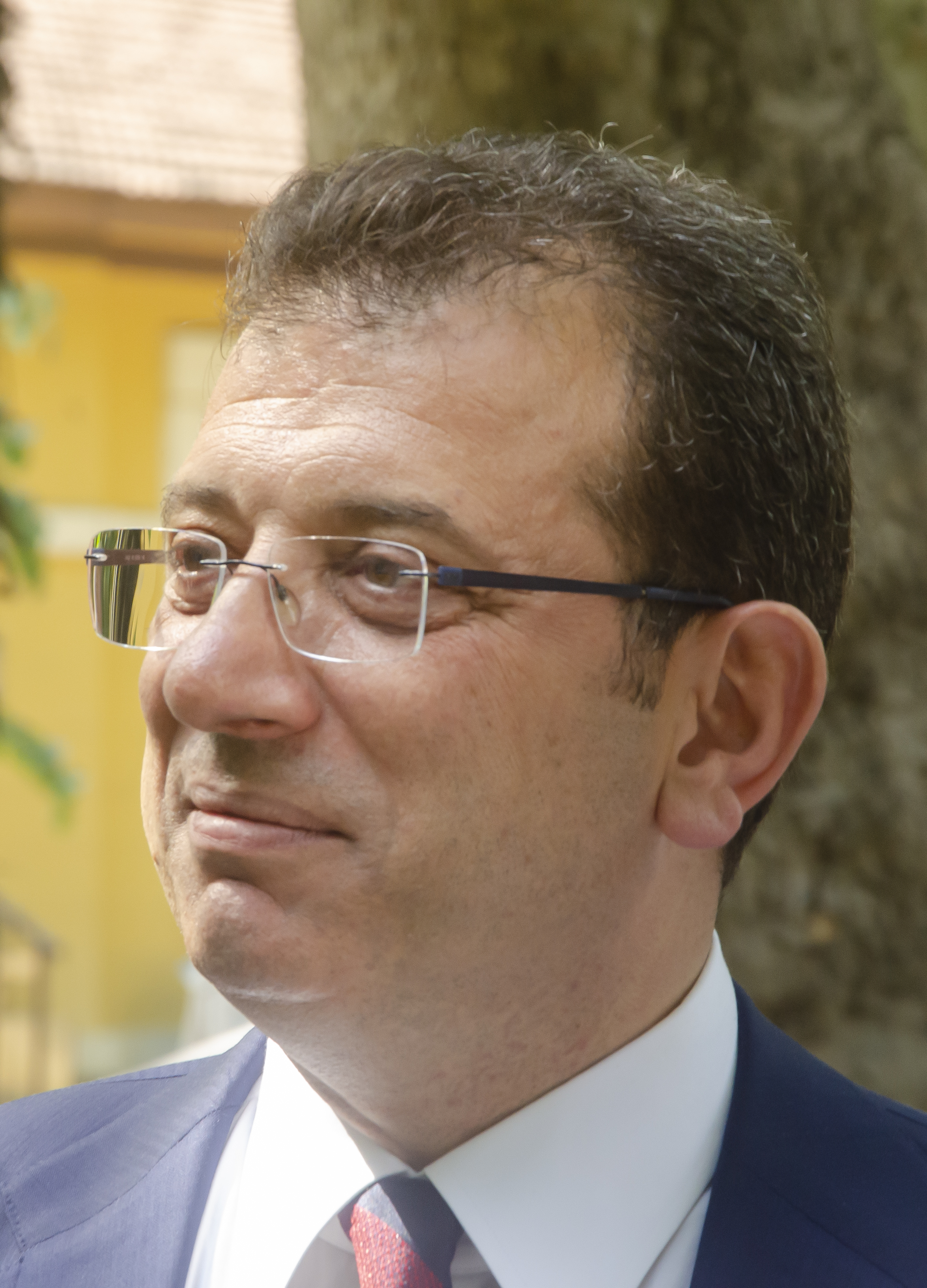

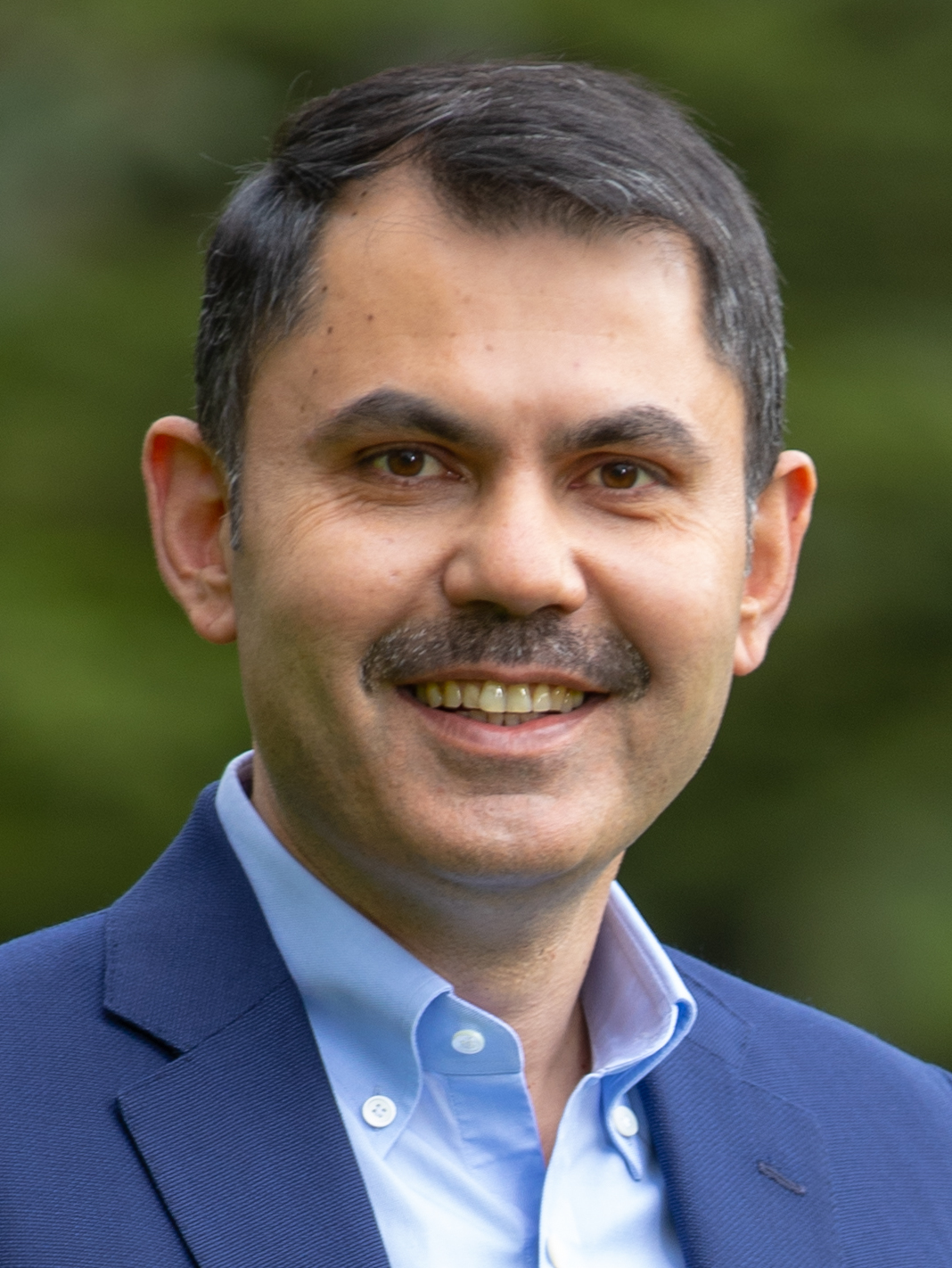
	First party	Second party
Candidate	Ekrem İmamoğlu	Murat Kurum
Party	CHP	AK Party
Alliance		People's Alliance
Popular vote	4,438,727	3,431,871
Percentage	51.21%	39.59%
Swing	▼3.01%	▼5.41%

Mayor before election
Ekrem İmamoğlu
CHP
Elected Mayor
Ekrem İmamoğlu
CHP

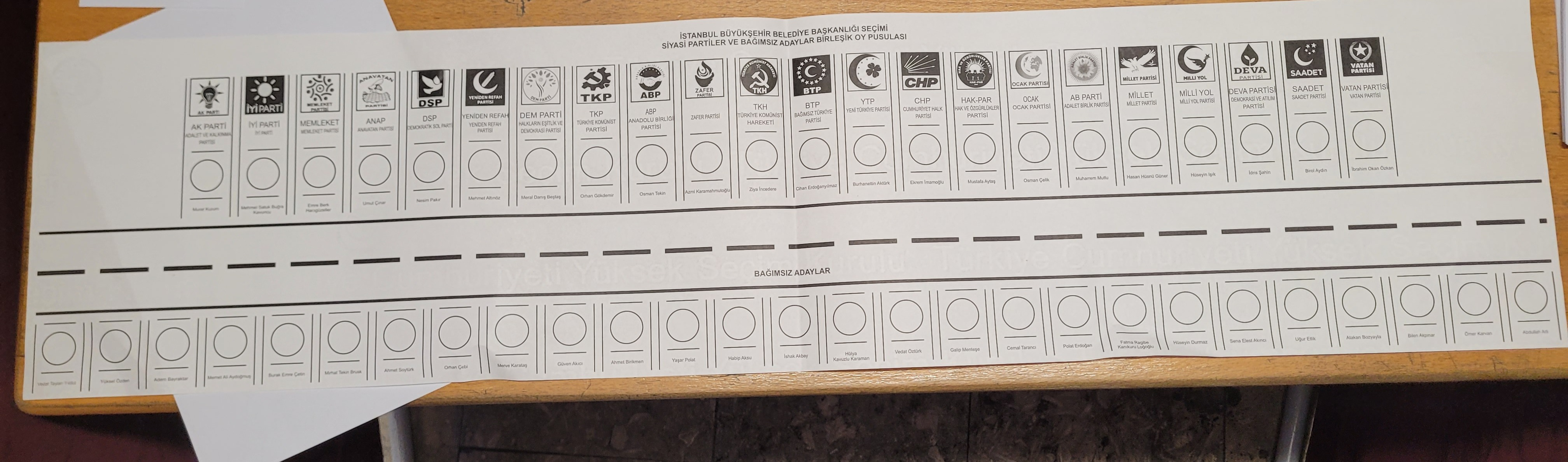
2024 Istanbul mayoral election ballot

Istanbul, Turkey's largest city, held mayoral elections on 31 March 2024 as part of the 2024 Turkish local elections. Incumbent mayor Ekrem İmamoğlu was re-elected with an absolute majority (51.21%) of the vote.

== Background and candidates ==
Ekrem İmamoğlu of the opposition Republican People's Party (CHP); İmamoğlu, when elected in 2019, became the first non-AK Party mayor of Istanbul in 25 years. In August 2023, he announced his intention to stand again, despite legal challenges to his candidacy.

On 7 January, Recep Tayyip Erdoğan, President of Turkey and leader of the ruling Justice and Development Party (AK Party), announced its candidate, Murat Kurum.

Başak Demirtaş, the wife of imprisoned pro-Kurdish Peoples' Democratic Party (HDP) leader Selahattin Demirtaş announced her intention to run but later withdrew. On 9 February, the HDP's successor, the Peoples' Equality and Democracy Party (DEM) named Murat Çepni and Meral Danış Beştaş as its joint mayoral candidates, with the final decision on who would lead to be left in the event of them winning the election.

== Campaigning ==
Both İmamoğlu and Kurum pledged to implement infrastructure projects to reinforce buildings against earthquakes and to ease chronic traffic congestion in the city.

== Incidents ==
On 10 February, gunmen opened fire at a campaign event in the Küçükçekmece district municipality for AK Party mayoral candidate Aziz Yeniay, critically injuring one person. Seventeen people were arrested in connection with the attack.

== Results ==
=== Metropolitan municipality mayoral election ===
==== Overall results ====
Candidate	Party	Votes	%
Ekrem İmamoğlu	Republican People's Party	4,438,727	51.21
Murat Kurum	Justice and Development Party	3,431,871	39.59
Mehmet Altınöz (tr)	New Welfare Party	226,731	2.62
Azmi Karamahmutoğlu (tr)	Victory Party	183,901	2.12
Meral Danış Beştaş	DEM Party	183,827	2.12
Mehmet Satuk Buğra Kavuncu (tr)	Good Party	54,241	0.63
Birol Aydın (tr)	Felicity Party	48,897	0.56
Emre Berk Hacıgüzeller	Homeland Party	14,860	0.17
İdris Şahin	Democracy and Progress Party	11,417	0.13
Burhanettin Aktürk	New Turkey Party	10,407	0.12
Mustafa Aytaş	Rights and Freedoms Party	8,769	0.10
Cihan Erdoğanyılmaz	Independent Turkey Party	8,534	0.10
Orhan Gökdemir	Communist Party of Turkey	7,408	0.09
Nesim Pakır	Democratic Left Party	5,273	0.06
İbrahim Okan Özkan	Patriotic Party	4,904	0.06
Vedat Taylan Yıldız (tr)	Independent	4,748	0.05
Umut Çınar	Motherland Party	2,992	0.03
Osman Tekin	Anatolian Unity Party	2,185	0.03
Hasan Hüsnü Güner	Nation Party	2,025	0.02
Ziya İncedere	Communist Movement of Turkey	1,951	0.02
Muharrem Mutlu	Justice Unity Party	1,827	0.02
Merve Karataş	Independent	1,652	0.02
Ishak Akbay	Independent	1,263	0.01
Hüseyin Işık	National Path Party	1,135	0.01
Hülya Kavuzlu Karaman	Independent	1,090	0.01
Adem Bayraktar	Independent	970	0.01
Vedat Öztürk	Independent	889	0.01
Galip Menteşe	Independent	782	0.01
Osman Çelik	Hearth Party	699	0.01
Memet Ali Aydoğmuş	Independent	332	0.00
Fatma Ragibe Kanıkuru Loğoğlu	Independent	279	0.00
Abdullah Arli	Independent	260	0.00
Sena Elest Akıncı	Independent	243	0.00
Orhan Çebi	Independent	232	0.00
Habip Aksu	Independent	203	0.00
Bilen Akpınar	Independent	192	0.00
Yaşar Polat	Independent	187	0.00
Burak Emre Çetin	Independent	185	0.00
Cemal Tarancı	Independent	180	0.00
Güven Akıcı	Independent	179	0.00
Polat Erdoğan	Independent	160	0.00
Atakan Bozyayla	Independent	154	0.00
Yüksel Özden	Independent	152	0.00
Ömer Karvan	Independent	148	0.00
Ahmet Soytürk	Independent	140	0.00
Hüseyin Durmaz	Independent	136	0.00
Mirhat Tekin Brusk	Independent	127	0.00
Uğur Etlik	Independent	119	0.00
Ahmet Birikmen	Independent	111	0.00
Total		8,667,694	100.00
Valid votes		8,667,694	96.63
Invalid/blank votes		302,683	3.37
Total votes		8,970,377	100.00
Registered voters/turnout		11,314,534	79.28
Source: Supreme Election Council of Turkey

==== Results by district ====
District	Ekrem İmamoğlu (CHP)		Murat Kurum (AK Party)		Others		Total votes	Registered electors
District	# of votes	%	# of votes	%	# of votes	%	# of votes	Registered electors
Adalar	7,336	69.7	2,483	23.6	711	6.7	10,530	13,682
Arnavutköy	64,466	38.1	81,777	48.3	23,155	13.6	169,398	225,240
Ataşehir	141,517	57.5	87,040	35.4	17,574	5.1	246,131	314,652
Avcılar	126,020	55.9	80,660	35.7	18,979	8.4	225,659	302,286
Bağcılar	150,182	39.1	189,378	49.3	44,269	11.6	383,829	511,524
Bahçelievler	152,758	47.8	137,241	42.9	29,683	9.3	319,682	420,018
Bakırköy	97,516	74.4	26,721	20.4	6,846	5.2	131,083	167,960
Başakşehir	104,705	42.7	114,207	46.5	26,506	10.8	245,418	324,937
Bayrampaşa	77,231	49.0	65,972	41.9	14,279	9.1	157,482	199,743
Beşiktaş	84,583	81.3	14,985	14.4	4,474	4.3	104,042	132,536
Beykoz	74,132	49.6	64,127	42.9	11,092	7.5	149,351	186,911
Beylikdüzü	117,062	55.6	76,216	36.2	17,423	8.2	210,701	274,115
Beyoğlu	60,433	49.4	50,889	41.6	11,135	9.0	122,457	165,518
Büyükçekmece	81,943	53.2	60,153	39.0	4,849	7.8	154,145	198,947
Çatalca	30,894	59.7	18,635	36.0	2,193	4.3	51,722	62,666
Çekmeköy	84,809	50.4	68,927	41.0	14,403	8.6	168,139	213,259
Esenler	86,333	36.9	121,130	51.7	26,702	11.4	234,165	308,902
Esenyurt	227,899	49.5	173,591	37.7	58,641	12.8	460,131	642,455
Eyüpsultan	126,709	52.5	94,803	39.3	19,840	8.2	241,352	309,535
Fatih	87,997	45.7	87,890	45.6	16,888	8.7	192,775	262,108
Gaziosmanpaşa	119,639	45.1	117,660	44.3	28,294	10.6	265,533	353,813
Güngören	64,550	44.4	66,706	45.9	14,024	9.7	145,280	194,056
Kadıköy	252,095	81.3	44,886	14.5	12,960	4.2	309,941	385,032
Kağıthane	114,573	46.1	108,948	43.8	25,027	10.1	248,548	329,357
Kartal	162,889	56.4	102,612	35.5	23,295	8.1	288,796	365,155
Küçükçekmece	233,897	54.1	152,733	35.3	45,891	10.6	432,521	568,586
Maltepe	191,962	61.7	98,387	31.6	20,815	6.7	311,164	395,769
Pendik	190,139	45.4	187,155	44.7	41,277	9.9	418,571	545,549
Sancaktepe	132,555	49.8	108,315	40.7	25,141	9.5	266,011	344,529
Sarıyer	119,916	59.3	69,582	34.4	12,765	6.3	202,263	259,165
Silivri	72,181	59.0	41,042	33.6	9,030	7.4	122,253	149,568
Sultanbeyli	58,509	32.0	100,740	55.0	23,770	13.0	183,019	246,463
Sultangazi	114,265	40.1	135,563	47.6	34,914	12.3	284,742	374,689
Şile	16,514	52.6	12,960	41.3	1,908	6.1	31,382	37,354
Şişli	104,819	70.0	35,380	23.6	9,622	6.4	149,821	201,665
Tuzla	86,078	52.4	63,415	38.6	14,973	9.0	164,466	208,680
Ümraniye	190,694	46.5	181,776	44.3	37,896	9.2	410,366	529,849
Üsküdar	163,765	52.0	128,881	40.9	22,532	7.1	315,178	401,184
Zeytinburnu	65,162	47.0	58,305	42.0	15,289	11.0	138,756	187,077
Istanbul	4,438,727	51.2	3,431,871	45.6	797,096	3.2	8,667,694	11,314,534

=== District elections ===
==== Full list ====
District	Before	Elected
Adalar	CHP	CHP
Arnavutköy	AK Party	AK Party
Ataşehir	CHP	CHP
Avcılar	CHP	CHP
Bağcılar	AK Party	AK Party
Bahçelievler	AK Party	AK Party
Bakırköy	CHP	CHP
Başakşehir	AK Party	AK Party
Bayrampaşa	AK Party	CHP
Beşiktaş	CHP	CHP

District	Before	Elected
Beykoz	AK Party	CHP
Beylikdüzü	CHP	CHP
Beyoğlu	AK Party	CHP
Büyükçekmece	CHP	CHP
Çatalca	AK Party	CHP
Çekmeköy	AK Party	CHP
Esenler	AK Party	AK Party
Esenyurt	CHP	CHP
Eyüpsultan	AK Party	CHP
Fatih	AK Party	AK Party

District	Before	Elected
Gaziosmanpaşa	AK Party	CHP
Güngören	AK Party	AK Party
Kadıköy	CHP	CHP
Kâğıthane	AK Party	AK Party
Kartal	CHP	CHP
Küçükçekmece	CHP	CHP
Maltepe	CHP	CHP
Pendik	AK Party	AK Party
Sancaktepe	AK Party	CHP
Sarıyer	CHP	CHP

District	Before	Elected
Silivri	MHP	CHP
Sultanbeyli	AK Party	AK Party
Sultangazi	AK Party	AK Party
Şile	AK Party	CHP
Şişli	CHP	CHP
Tuzla	AK Party	CHP
Ümraniye	AK Party	AK Party
Üsküdar	AK Party	CHP
Zeytinburnu	AK Party	AK Party

== Reactions ==
President Erdoğan acknowledged the AK Party’s defeat in Istanbul and other cities but said that it would mark "not an end for us but rather a turning point", adding that he would respect the result. Speaking to supporters in Saraçhane, İmamoğlu said that “our citizens' trust and faith in us has been rewarded".
