= Opinion polling for the 2024 Turkish local elections =

This page lists opinion polls leading up to the 2024 Turkish local elections.

== Mediterranean region ==
=== Adana ===
Date	Pollster	Sample	CHP	AKP	İYİ	DEM	MHP	Others	Undecided	Lead
27-28 Mar	BETİMAR	5.089	44,6	39,0	6,5	4,9	—	4,5	—	5,6
25-28 Mar	ORC	2.290	31,5	27,7	27,3	7,1	—	6,4	—	3,8
24-27 Mar	AREA	2.012	47,2	40,1	6	4	—	2,7	—	7,1
12-26 Mar	Avrasya	?	45,6	35,7	—	—	—	18,7	—	9,9
21-25 Mar	Areda Survey	1.963	40,3	41,8	7	5,6	—	5,3	—	1,5
7-13 Mar	AREA	3.003	47,1	40	5,5	4,1	—	3,3	—	7,1
6-12 Mar	Yöneylem	9.228	47,2	38,6	5,5	5	—	3,7	—	8,6
4-11 Mar	ASAL	1.653	40,3	39,2	7,6	4,6	—	8,3	—	1,1
1-5 Mar	ADA	1.500	41,9	42,6	5	—	—	10,5	—	0,7
23 Şub-4 Mar	MAK	1.610	34	35	12	5	—	9	5	1,0
2-4 Mar	ORC	2.320	34,1	27,7	24,5	4,5	—	2,5	6,7	6,4
2024
31 Mar 2019	2019 elections	1.223.105	53,6	—	—	—	42,8	3,6	—	10,8

==== Çukurova ====
Date	Pollster	Sample	CHP	İYİ	AKP	DEM	MHP	Others	Undecided	Lead
Mar	HBS	600	27,3	29,3	20,6	2,4	—	6,8	13,6	2
9-11 Mar	Gezici	4.568	28,1	39,4	23,6	3,4	—	—	—	11,3
Feb	İzlem	?	28,3	34,2	27,1	2,8	—	7,6	—	5,9
2024
31 Mar 2019	2019 elections	214.961	58,3	—	—	—	36,3	5,4	—	23

=== Antalya ===
Date	Pollster	Sample	CHP	AKP	İYİ	DEM	ZP	YRP	Others	Lead
Mar	GENAR	?	43,7	45,7	3,7	2	1,7	1,8	1,4	2
25-26 Mar	ORC	2.720	44,5	39	7,3	5,9	—	—	3,3	5,5
12-26 Mar	Avrasya	?	43,3	41,7	—	—	—	—	15	1,6
21-25 Mar	Areda Survey	4.358	44	42,3	3,7	4,9	2,7	1,5	0,8	1,7
18-24 Mar	ALF	3.200	38,5	40,7	9,1	6,5	—	—	5,2	2,2
20-22 Mar	Pollstar	3.000	37,6	44,3	7,1	5,7	—	—	5,3	6,7
13-18 Mar	ASAL	1.500	41,4	39,6	6,9	4,1	1,9	2,5	3,6	1,8
1-15 Mar	ADA	1.500	41,5	44,2	5,8	—	—	—	8,5	2,7
21 Şub-4 Mar	MAK	1.910	34	41	7	7	2	1,5	2,5	7
1-2 Mar	Özdemir	8.444	40,5	42,3	4,1	5,1	2,9	2,7	2,4	1,8
18-20 Feb	Optimar	2.500	46,6	45,1	2,9	1,5	0,7	2,5	0,7	1,5
2024
Eylül	ASAL	1.764	37,3	34	10,6	2,1	—	—	16,3	3,3
2023
31 Mar 2019	2019 elections	1.411.011	50,6	46,3	—	—	—	—	3,1	4,3

==== Alanya ====
Date	Pollster	Sample	MHP	İYİ	CHP	Others	Lead
23-26 Mar	Pi-Ar	1.400	31,2	37.3	28	3.5	6,1
20-23 Mar	ORC	1.500	30,2	38,1	27,1	4,6	7,9
2024
31 Mar 2019	2019 elections	163.291	57,6	36,2	—	6,2	21,4

==== Döşemealtı ====
Date	Pollster	Sample	CHP	AKP	İYİ	DEM	Others	Lead
20-23 Mar	ORC	850	39,2	42	6,9	3,5	8,4	2,8
2024
31 Mar 2019	2019 elections	38.360	48,7	48,5	—	—	2,8	0,2

==== Kaş ====
Date	Pollster	Sample	AKP	CHP	TİP	İYİ	DP	Others	Lead
26 Mar	Kırmızı Kare	11.516	52,8	39,8	5,1	2,3	—	—	13
2024
31 Mar 2019	2019 elections	38.051	42,9	34,9	—	—	21,0	1,2	8

==== Kepez ====
Date	Pollster	Sample	AKP	CHP	DEM	İYİ	Others	Lead
20-23 Mar	ORC	1.650	38,4	42,1	7,2	6,5	5,8	3,7
2024
31 Mar 2019	2019 elections	297.906	50,4	44,6	—	—	5	5,8

==== Konyaaltı ====
Date	Pollster	Sample	CHP	AKP	TİP	İYİ	Others	Lead
20-23 Mar	ORC	1.740	49,6	23,2	10,9	10,4	5,9	26,4
2024
31 Mar 2019	2019 elections	95.858	66,8	30,8	—	—	2,4	36

=== Burdur ===
Date	Pollster	Sample	CHP	AKP	İYİ	Others	Lead
18-20 Mar	ORC	1.200	41,5	39,6	13,4	5,5	1,9
2024
31 Mar 2019	2019 elections	49.901	53,2	44,1	—	2,7	9,1

=== Hatay ===
Date	Pollster	Sample	AKP	CHP	TİP	İYİ	DEM	YRP	ZP	Others	Undecided	Lead
24-27 Mar	AREA	2.010	45	46	2,1	2	1,4	1,2	1	1,3	—	1
12-26 Mar	Avrasya	?	41,3	43,7	—	—	—	—	—	15	—	2,4
21-25 Mar	Areda Survey	2.445	43,0	39,8	—	4,6	2,2	3,9	—	6,5	—	3,2
Mar	GENAR	?	50,8	37	3,2	3,9	1,4	1,6	1,1	1	—	13,8
8-21 Mar	Optimar	15.000	48,9	39	5,1	—	—	1,7	—	5,2	—	9,9
6-12 Mar	ASAL	1.250	42,2	35.3	7,8	5,1	2,3	3,2	2,3	2,5	—	6,9
1-5 Mar	ADA	1.500	48,4	32,1	7,4	4,9	2,2	2,5	1,8	1,6	—	16,3
21 Şub-5 Mar	MAK	1.070	39	34	12	3	2	2	1	6,0	1	5
2-5 Mar	Ser-Ar	2.100	48,8	32,4	6,4	5,5	—	—	—	6,9	—	16,4
10-17 Feb	AREA	7.000	31,2	35,5	—	—	—	—	—	9,3	24	4,3
11-13 Feb	ORC	1.970	41,9	25,1	8,2	4,5	2,6	2,1	2,2	1,8	11,6	16,8
2024
31 Mar 2019	2019 elections	888.857	42,8	55,1	—	—	—	—	—	2,1	—	12,3

==== Altınözü ====
Date	Pollster	Sample	AKP	SP	CHP	ZP	Others	Lead
Mar	Optimar	?	61,4	4,9	25,5	5,8	2,4	35,9
2024
31 Mar 2019	2019 local elections	30.919	63,1	36	—	—	0,9	27,1

==== Antakya ====
Date	Pollster	Sample	AKP	CHP	YRP	İYİ	Others	Lead
Mar	Optimar	?	62,5	27,9	3,2	2,4	4	34,6
2024
31 Mar 2019	Yerel seçimler	200.280	55,2	42,5	—	—	2,3	12,7

==== Arsuz ====
Date	Pollster	Sample	CHP	AKP	TİP	İYİ	Others	Lead
Mar	Optimar	?	60,3	23	9,3	4,7	2,7	37,3
2024
31 Mar 2019	2019 local elections	52.448	71,9	25,5	—	—	2,6	46,4

==== Belen ====
Date	Pollster	Sample	MHP	İYİ	CHP	BBP	Others	Lead
Mar	Optimar	?	69,1	3,3	20,4	2,7	4,5	48,7
2024
31 Mar 2019	Yerel seçimler	20.313	61	37,2	—	—	1,8	23,8

==== Defne ====
Date	Pollster	Sample	CHP	DSP	AKP	TKP	TİP	SOL	Others	Lead
Mar	Optimar	?	33,8	—	15,9	29,1	11,4	7,4	2,4	4,7
2024
31 Mar 2019	2019 local elections	87.862	68,6	24,3	6,2	0,3	—	—	1,8	44,3

==== Hassa ====
Date	Pollster	Sample	AKP	BBP	İYİ	Others	Lead
Mar	Optimar	?	48,8	23	18,9	9,3	25,8
2024
31 Mar 2019	Yerel seçimler	32.034	55	0,9	43,1	1	11,9

==== İskenderun ====
Date	Pollster	Sample	AKP	CHP	DP	İYİ	TİP	DEM	Others	Lead
Mar	Optimar	?	53,4	31,4	—	8,2	—	2,1	—	22,0
7-8 Mar	Betimar	1.573	50,3	31,4	—	7,2	3	2,4	7,7	18,9
2024
31 Mar 2019	2019 local elections	142.557	40,3	36,6	21,3	—	—	—	1,8	3,7

==== Kırıkhan ====
Date	Pollster	Sample	AKP	İYİ	YRP	CHP	ZP	Others	Lead
Mar	Optimar	?	57,1	—	33,6	5,3	3,4	—	23,5
2024
31 Mar 2019	Yerel seçimler	63.000	58,8	38,6	—	—	—	3,5	20,2

==== Kumlu ====
Date	Pollster	Sample	MHP	CHP	BBP	Others	Lead
Mar	Optimar	?	34,2	14,4	45,2	—	13,0
2024
31 Mar 2019	2019 local elections	7.821	60,7	37,1	1,5	0,6	23,6

==== Payas ====
Date	Pollster	Sample	AKP	CHP	SP	Others	Lead
Mar	Optimar	?	56,6	8,0	32,0	—	24,4
2024
31 Mar 2019	Yerel seçimler	24.587	42,9	40,0	16,6	0,4	2,9

==== Reyhanlı ====
Date	Pollster	Sample	AKP	CHP	YRP	Others	Lead
Mar	Optimar	?	54,4	31,2	11,0	—	23,2
2024
31 Mar 2019	2019 local elections	45.138	59,1	37,4	—	3,5	21,7

==== Samandağ ====
Date	Pollster	Sample	CHP	TİP	AKP	DSP	Others	Lead
Mar	Optimar	?	41,3	51,7	5,0	—	—	10,4
2024
31 Mar 2019	Yerel seçimler	65.502	63,2	—	7,0	26,3	2,7	14,5

==== Yayladağı ====
Date	Pollster	Sample	AKP	YRP	CHP	BBP	Others	Lead
Mar	Optimar	?	67	29,9	2,9	—	0,2	37,1
2024
31 Mar 2019	Yerel seçimler	19.363	55,6	—	—	41,5	2,9	14,1

=== Isparta ===
Date	Pollster	Sample	AKP	İYİ	MHP	CHP	ZP	Others	Undecided	Lead
26-28 Mar	ORC	1.210	29,2	34,3	16,2	13,7	3	3,6	—	5,1
12-16 Mar	ALF	1.380	28,3	29,4	14,5	13,2	4,5	3,3	6,8	1,1
2-4 Mar	ORC	1.070	28,8	27,2	19,2	15,4	—	2,9	6,5	1,6
19-24 Feb	Themis	1.047	30,3	13,2	14,6	11,4	26,4	4,2	—	3,9
2024
31 Mar 2019	Yerel seçimler	132.489	38	28,6	30,8	—	—	2,3	—	7,2

=== Kahramanmaraş ===
Date	Pollster	Sample	AKP	CHP	YRP	İYİ	ZP	Others	Lead
Mar	GENAR	?	50,9	15,9	26,2	3,2	2,1	1,7	24,7
12-26 Mar	Avrasya	?	56,8	17,9	—	—	—	25,3	38,9
21-25 Mar	Areda Survey	1.307	51,1	15,9	22	6,9	1,9	2,3	35,3
1-15 Mar	ADA	1.500	50,4	19,6	23,2	2,3	3,3	1,2	30,8
12-14 Mar	ASAL	1.250	48,2	17,4	24,4	3	2,4	4,6	23,8
21 Şub-3 Mar	MAK	4.300	56	20	5	5	0,5	8,5	36
2024
31 Mar 2019	Yerel seçimler	624.585	67,6	27,2	—	—	—	1,8	40,4

=== Mersin ===
Date	Pollster	Sample	CHP	MHP	İYİ	DEM	YRP	ZP	Others	Undecided	Lead
24-27 Mar	AREA	2.005	60	35,1	1	—	0,7	0,6	2,7	—	24,9
15-26 Mar	ADA	1.500	46,7	42,7	4,8	—	—	—	5,8	—	4
12-26 Mar	Avrasya	?	52,1	38,1	—	—	—	—	9,8	—	14
21-25 Mar	Areda Survey	3.101	48,1	39	5,6	—	—	1,3	6	—	8,9
18-23 Mar	SAROS	1.492	48,9	38,1	5,7	—	—	—	7,3	—	10,8
5-10 Mar	AREA	3.054	59,6	35,3	2,6	1	0,7	0,6	0,2	—	24,3
3-7 Mar	ASAL	1.500	42,9	39,7	5,5	—	1,7	2,2	8	—	3,2
24 Şub-5 Mar	MAK	1.380	41	36	6	3	3	2	5,0	5	5
2024
31 Mar 2019	Yerel seçimler	1.057.902	45	40,9	—	—	—	—	13,4	—	4,1

==== Silifke ====
Date	Pollster	Sample	MHP	CHP	İYİ	Others	Lead
18-20 Mar	ORC	1.210	51,9	37,4	6,2	4,5	14,5
2024
31 Mar 2019	Yerel seçimler	76.832	43,9	37,3	15,7	3,1	6,6

==== Toroslar ====
Date	Pollster	Sample	MHP	CHP	İYİ	Others	Lead
18-20 Mar	ORC	1.650	45,4	39,6	7,0	8,0	5,8
2024
31 Mar 2019	Yerel seçimler	164.375	41,6	37,7	16,6	4,1	3,9

==== Yenişehir ====
Date	Pollster	Sample	CHP	AKP	İYİ	Others	Lead
18-20 Mar	ORC	1.520	53,8	27,2	7,5	11,5	26,6
2024
31 Mar 2019	Yerel seçimler	144.510	63,5	27,5	5,5	3,5	36,0

== Doğu Anadolu ==
=== Elazığ ===
Date	Pollster	Sample	AKP	MHP	İYİ	CHP	YRP	Others	Undecided	Lead
Mar	GENAR	?	50,8	8,8	2,2	17,6	12,4	8,2	—	33,2
7-10 Mar	ORC	1.160	36,1	11,5	5,5	24,6	11,9	3	7,4	11,5
2024
31 Mar 2019	Yerel seçimler	180.563	40,3	34,5	17	—	—	8,2	—	5,8

=== Erzurum ===
Date	Pollster	Sample	AKP	İYİ	CHP	DEM	YRP	HDP	Others	Undecided	Lead
12-26 Mar	Avrasya	?	56,9	11,3	—	—	—	—	43,1	—	45,6
21-25 Mar	Areda Survey	2.038	49,8	27,2	2,0	6,8	—	—	14,3	—	22,6
1-15 Mar	ADA	1.500	58,9	8,5	8,3	8,9	10,1	—	5,3	—	48,8
23 Şub-5 Mar	MAK	1.020	55	22	3	6	4	—	5	5	33
Mar	SONAR	3.773	71,2	8,8	8,6	8,8	—	—	2,6	—	62,4
2024
31 Mar 2019	Yerel seçimler	384.917	62,8	25,4	2,4	—	—	6	3,4	—	37,4

=== Kars ===
Date	Pollster	Sample	HDP	MHP	CHP	DSP	İYİ	DEM	IND	Others	Undecided	Lead
26-28 Mar	ORC	1.090	—	22,1	12,4	—	31,8	28,6	—	5,1	—	3,2
14-19 Mar	ALF	1.300	—	22,2	13,3	—	31,2	28,7	—	4,6	—	2,5
7-9 Mar	ORC	1.065	—	19,1	15,1	—	23,8	21,5	7,3	3,7	9,5	2,3
2024
31 Mar 2019	Yerel seçimler	41.224	29,5	26,5	22,1	18,4	2,2	—	—	1,3	—	3

=== Malatya ===
Date	Pollster	Sample	AKP	CHP	YRP	İYİ	DEVA	Others	Undecided	Lead
12-26 Mar	Avrasya	?	45,1	24,9	—	—	—	30	—	20,2
21-25 Mar	Areda Survey	2.527	45,5	26,8	16,5	2,1	—	9,1	—	17,7
1-15 Mar	ADA	1.500	41,4	36,2	17,8	—	—	4,6	—	5,2
10-15 Mar	DENGE	4.306	62,7	20,2	11,1	2	—	4	—	42,5
21 Şub-6 Mar	MAK	1.530	40	22	17	3	7	5	6	18
2024
31 Mar 2019	Yerel seçimler	463.826	68,4	23,2	—	—	—	8,4	—	45,2

=== Van ===
Date	Pollster	Sample	HDP	AKP	CHP	İYİ	DEM	Others	Lead
15-26 Mar	ADA	1.500	—	34,3	—	—	50,8	14,9	16,5
12-26 Mar	Avrasya	?	—	26,5	—	—	52,9	20,6	26,4
21-25 Mar	Areda Survey	1.444	—	29,5	3,9	—	58,8	7,8	29,3
21 Şub-7 Mar	MAK	1.420	—	31	3	3	48	10	17
2024
31 Mar 2019	Yerel seçimler	483.905	53,8	40,5	1,9	1,1	—	—	13,3

== Ege ==
=== Aydın ===
Date	Pollster	Sample	CHP	AKP	İYİ	DEM	YRP	ZP	Others	Undecided	Lead
12-26 Mar	Avrasya	?	46,1	35,2	—	—	—	—	18,7	—	10,9
21-25 Mar	Areda Survey	2.823	40,9	41,3	8,6	4,8	1,4	2,2	0,8	—	0,4
18-23 Mar	Optimar	2.000	43,2	44,0	4,2	3,5	—	2,5	2,6	—	0,8
17-19 Mar	ORC	2.900	41,1	41,9	6,4	3,9	1,7	2,8	2,2	—	0,8
Mar	SONAR	4.432	50,9	32,6	5,3	6,6	1,6	1,8	1,8	—	18,3
15-18 Mar	ALF	2.720	37,4	38,9	7,8	4,6	1,4	1,8	2,1	6	1,5
13-16 Mar	Piar	2.060	40,5	43,1	7,5	5	—	—	3,9	—	2,6
21 Şub-5 Mar	MAK	1.740	42	36	7	3	2	2	3	5	6
20-28 Feb	ADA	1.500	46,5	39,7	5,9	4,1	—	—	3,8	—	6,8
20-25 Feb	ASAL	1.500	42,8	36,4	8,5	6,2	1,6	1,6	2,9	—	6,4
2024
31 Mar 2019	Yerel seçimler	683.704	53,9	43,7	—	—	—	—	2,3	—	10,2

=== Denizli ===
Date	Pollster	Sample	AKP	İYİ	CHP	YRP	Others	Undecided	Lead
Mar	GENAR	?	53,8	7,7	32,8	1,7	4	—	21
12-26 Mar	Avrasya	?	41,9	—	42,1	—	—	—	0,2
23-25 Mar	ORC	2.260	40,6	7,4	43,1	—	8,9	—	2,5
21-25 Mar	Areda Survey	1.736	41,4	9,2	39,1	2,9	7,2	—	2,3
6-11 Mar	ALF	2.500	38,6	7,9	41,4	—	4,9	7,2	2,8
5-9 Mar	ORC	2.100	39,8	5,3	40,2	1,8	3,1	9,8	0,4
1-5 Mar	ADA	1.500	51,4	5,1	37,4	—	6,1	—	14,0
23 Şub-6 Mar	MAK	1.580	42	15	26	2	10	5	16
26 Şub-1 Mar	ASAL	1.350	41,5	10,9	36	2,8	8,8	—	5,5
2024
31 Mar 2019	Yerel seçimler	636.308	50,6	43,9	—	—	5,5	—	6,7

=== İzmir ===
Date	Pollster	Sample	CHP	AKP	İYİ	DEM	ZP	Others	Undecided	Lead
29-30 Mar	BETİMAR	3.722	40,9	40,6	6,6	5,3	3,0	3,6	—	0,3
27-28 Mar	Özdemir	2.409	43,4	41,9	4,4	3,6	3,1	3,5	—	1,5
25-28 Mar	ORC	3.220	44,9	36,2	10,6	3,8	—	4,5	—	8,7
23-26 Mar	AREA	3.066	42,4	38,7	8	6,5	2,5	1,9	—	3,7
12-26 Mar	Avrasya	?	50,4	32,1	—	—	—	17,5	—	18,3
21-25 Mar	Areda Survey	2.473	43,7	37,6	9,1	4,8	2,7	2,1	—	6,1
9-17 Mar	ASAL	2.000	45,5	35,8	6,9	5,3	2,2	4,3	—	9,7
12-16 Mar	Piar	2.900	50,4	37,5	4,7	5,2	—	2,2	—	12,9
1-15 Mar	ADA	1.500	42,4	38,8	6,5	7,2	—	5,1	—	3,6
11-13 Mar	Özdemir	5.289	36,7	34,4	6,6	7,3	9,9	5,0	—	2,3
21 Şub-3 Mar	MAK	3.550	48	31	7	4	2	4	4	17
28 Şub-3 Mar	ORC	5.400	40,1	31,2	13,6	5,5	—	3,1	6,5	8,9
11-14 Feb	ALF	2.200	40,7	32,3	7,1	4,6	2,2	2,5	10,6	8,4
1-3 Feb	ORC	2.650	38,2	34,7	8,6	5,9	1,9	2,1	8,6	3,5
2024
15-19 Dec	ALF	2.700	49,2	34,5	6,3	6,5	—	—	3,5	14,7
2023
31 Mar 2019	Yerel seçimler	2.667.297	58,1	38,7	—	—	—	4,2	—	19,4

==== Balçova ====
Date	Pollster	Sample	CHP	AKP	İYİ	DEM	Others	Undecided	Lead
28 Şub-3 Mar	ORC	640	57,2	12,5	10,8	4,2	2,0	13,3	44,7
2024
31 Mar 2019	Yerel seçimler	60.745	67,2	26,9	—	—	5,9	—	40,3

==== Bayraklı ====
Date	Pollster	Sample	CHP	AKP	İYİ	DEM	Others	Undecided	Lead
28 Şub-3 Mar	ORC	1020	38,5	34,0	6,0	6,8	2,2	12,5	4,5
2024
31 Mar 2019	Yerel seçimler	236.339	55,1	41,1	—	—	3,8	—	14,0

==== Bornova ====
Date	Pollster	Sample	CHP	AKP	İYİ	DEM	Others	Undecided	Lead
28 Şub-3 Mar	ORC	1140	43,3	27,0	8,6	5,1	3,0	13,0	16,3
2024
31 Mar 2019	Yerel seçimler	325.344	57,5	38,2	—	—	4,3	—	19,3

==== Buca ====
Date	Pollster	Sample	CHP	AKP	İYİ	DEM	Others	Undecided	Lead
26-28 Mar	ORC	1.800	32,2	26,3	30,7	6,8	4	—	1,5
28 Şub-3 Mar	ORC	1.420	29,5	27,9	21,1	7,2	2,1	12,2	1,6
2024
31 Mar 2019	Yerel seçimler	365.061	49,6	44,2	—	—	6,2	—	5,4

==== Narlıdere ====
Date	Pollster	Sample	CHP	AKP	İYİ	DEM	Others	Undecided	Lead
28 Şub-3 Mar	ORC	510	55,9	16,7	10,9	6,4	2,9	7,2	39,2
2024
31 Mar 2019	Yerel seçimler	49.386	79,4	16,0	—	—	4,6	—	63,4

==== Tire ====
Date	Pollster	Sample	İYİ	AKP	MHP	CHP	DEM	Others	Lead
26-28 Mar	ORC	1.100	32,8	—	29,2	24,6	5,2	8,2	3,6
2024
31 Mar 2019	Yerel seçimler	55.331	46	43	—	—	—	11	3

==== Torbalı ====
Date	Pollster	Sample	CHP	AKP	İYİ	DEM	SP	Others	Undecided	Lead
26-28 Mar	ORC	1.140	46,8	40,3	3,3	5,7	—	3,9	—	6,5
28 Şub-3 Mar	ORC	720	40,1	32,6	5,3	5,5	2,1	1,5	14,7	7,5
2024
31 Mar 2019	Yerel seçimler	127.879	52,4	45,2	—	—	—	2,4	—	7,2

=== Manisa ===
Date	Pollster	Sample	MHP	İYİ	CHP	GP	YRP	Others	Undecided	Lead
15-26 Mar	ADA	1.500	44,2	6,3	42,8	—	—	6,7	—	1,4
12-26 Mar	Avrasya	?	42,1	—	41,7	—	—	16,2	—	0,4
21-25 Mar	Areda Survey	3.346	42,5	6,3	44,8	—	1,7	4,7	—	2,3
12-16 Mar	Aksoy	2.400	39,1	3,4	51,8	0,5	2,1	3,1	—	12,7
17-23 Mar	ALF	2.700	38,2	6,5	46,7	—	3,2	5,4	—	8,5
14-20 Mar	ORC	3.500	37,7	4,8	42,2	—	2,9	4,4	8	4,5
5-8 Mar	ASAL	1.500	42,6	8,8	37,2	—	4,3	7,1	—	5,4
28 Şub-3 Mar	MAK	2.220	41	4	28	18	2	3	4	13,0
Feb	SONAR	7.597	48,2	7,9	35,1	—	3,9	4,9	—	13,1
2024
31 Mar 2019	Yerel seçimler	873.021	52,7	38	—	—	—	9,3	—	14,7

==== Şehzadeler ====
Date	Pollster	Sample	AKP	İYİ	CHP	ZP	Others	Undecided	Lead
17-20 Mar	ALF	1.400	34,8	36,7	22,1	4,1	2,3	—	1,9
17-20 Mar	ORC	1.450	31,5	33,3	24,2	—	3,5	7,5	1,8
2024
31 Mar 2019	Yerel seçimler	98.775	46,2	44,1	—	—	9,7	—	2,1

==== Turgutlu ====
Date	Pollster	Sample	CHP	MHP	BBP	YRP	İYİ	DEM	ZP	Others	Lead
7-8 Mar	SONAR	1.327	27,3	27,5	—	22,8	9,1	7,6	1,5	4,2	0,2
2024
31 Mar 2019	Yerel seçimler	99.227	37,2	36,8	23,1	—	—	—	—	2,9	1,4

==== Yunusemre ====
Date	Pollster	Sample	AKP	İYİ	CHP	ZP	Others	Undecided	Lead
20-23 Mar	ALF	1.400	33,1	37,6	24,2	3,5	1,6	—	4,5
17-20 Mar	ORC	1.500	30,1	34,7	26,2	—	2,8	6,2	4,6
2024
31 Mar 2019	Yerel seçimler	135.063	42,85	42,83	—	—	14,32	—	0,02

=== Muğla ===
Date	Pollster	Sample	CHP	AKP	İYİ	DEM	Others	Undecided	Lead
Mar	GENAR	?	39,2	41,6	11,7	2,3	5,2	—	2,4
12-26 Mar	Avrasya	?	48,6	32,1	—	—	19,3	—	16,5
21-25 Mar	Areda Survey	2.901	48,2	34,1	12,2	1,5	4	—	14,1
2-15 Mar	ASAL	1.300	40,5	35,4	13,5	6,3	4,3	—	5,1
1-15 Mar	ADA	1.500	42,7	38,4	10,9	—	8	—	4,3
Mar	SONAR	3.586	38,9	36,1	14,6	—	10,4	—	2,8
24 Şub-6 Mar	MAK	1.620	37	31	16	3	8,0	5	6
28 Şub-3 Mar	ORC	1.850	34,1	23,5	22,6	4,9	4,5	10,4	10,6
2024
31 Mar 2019	Yerel seçimler	603.862	36	28,4	—	—	35,6	—	7,6

==== Bodrum ====
Date	Pollster	Sample	AKP	CHP	İYİ	DEM	TİP	Others	Lead
29 Feb-4 Mar	Optimar	2.000	48,1	47,1	0,8	1,9	1	1	1
2024
31 Mar 2019	Yerel seçimler	99.987	15,9	45,6	34,5	—	—	4	11,1

==== Fethiye ====
Date	Pollster	Sample	CHP	AKP	İYİ	MHP	Others	Undecided	Lead
28 Şub-3 Mar	ORC	830	27,4	—	30,6	22,1	4,2	15,7	3,2
2024
31 Mar 2019	Yerel seçimler	94.895	47,7	44,4	6,1	—	1,8	—	3,3

==== Marmaris ====
Date	Pollster	Sample	CHP	AKP	İYİ	Others	Undecided	Lead
28 Şub-3 Mar	ORC	750	30,5	21,1	32,2	3,2	13	1,7
2024
31 Mar 2019	Yerel seçimler	54.751	44,6	34,7	19,7	35,6	—	9,9

==== Menteşe ====
Date	Pollster	Sample	CHP	AKP	İYİ	Others	Undecided	Lead
28 Şub-3 Mar	ORC	1.016	36,7	29,2	13,1	4,6	16,4	7,5
2024
31 Mar 2019	Yerel seçimler	68.721	53,8	30,3	7,5	8,4	—	23,5

=== Uşak ===
Date	Pollster	Sample	AKP	İYİ	MHP	CHP	Others	Undecided	Lead
25-27 Mar	ORC	1.150	33,4	35,1	13,2	16,7	1,6	—	1,7
14-17 Mar	ALF	1.200	31,8	33,2	9,4	14,6	1,3	9,7	1,4
10-13 Mar	Paradigma	2.703	28,7	12,1	20,1	32,5	6,6	—	3,8
26-28 Feb	ORC	1.020	32,5	30,9	–	21,9	4,6	10,1	1,6
1-4 Feb	Üstün Danışmanlık	1.695	33,2	16,4	10,6	32,1	7,7	—	1,1
2024
31 Mar 2019	Yerel seçimler	130.429	39,1	37,7	10,7	10,3	2,2	—	1,4

== Güneydoğu Anadolu ==
=== Diyarbakır ===
Date	Pollster	Sample	HDP	AKP	DEM	HÜDA	CHP	YRP	Others	Undecided	Lead
21-25 Mar	Areda Survey	1.217	—	23,3	63,6	—	1,4	4,0	7,8	—	40,3
12-26 Mar	Avrasya	?	—	19,9	61,2	—	—	—	18,9	—	41,3
1-15 Mar	ADA	1.500	—	28,2	59,8	—	3,8	2,4	5,8	—	31,6
24 Şub-5 Mar	MAK	1.150	—	29	54	5	1	2	4	5	25
22 Şub-2 Mar	ASAL	1.415	—	25,4	59,8	3,6	3,3	2,7	5,2	—	34,4
2024
31 Mar 2019	Yerel seçimler	779.593	62,9	30,9	—	—	—	—	6,2	—	32,0

=== Gaziantep ===
Date	Pollster	Sample	AKP	DSP	İYİ	CHP	DEM	YRP	ZP	Others	Undecided	Lead
12-26 Mar	Avrasya	?	48	—	—	27,8	—	—	—	24,2	—	20,2
21-25 Mar	Areda Survey	2.377	49,5	—	3,4	23,2	7,7	10,6	3	2,6	—	26,3
18-21 Mar	ASAL	1.500	53,2	—	3,6	22,4	6	8,6	3,4	2,8	—	30,8
1-15 Mar	ADA	1.500	56,3	—	—	21,2	5,5	10	—	7	—	35,1
23 Şub-5 Mar	MAK	1.360	52	—	5	20	8	3	3	4	5	32
25-27 Jan	ORC	1.960	50,9	—	4,3	21,1	6,2	2,5	—	2,8	12,2	29,8
2024
31 Mar 2019	Yerel seçimler	917.080	53,9	26,2	16,4	—	—	—	—	3,5	—	27,7

==== Şehitkamil ====
Date	Pollster	Sample	AKP	CHP	İYİ	DEM	YRP	ZP	Others	Undecided	Lead
26-28 Mar	ORC	1.620	32,6	35,7	3,7	4,5	15,5	2,5	5,5	—	3,1
2024
31 Mar 2019	Yerel seçimler	334.364	53,6	28,1	10,9	—	—	—	3,5	—	27,7

=== Mardin ===
Date	Pollster	Sample	HDP	AKP	CHP	İYİ	YRP	DEM	Others	Undecided	Lead
12-26 Mar	Avrasya	?	—	21,3	—	—	—	56,8	21,9	—	35,5
21-25 Mar	Areda Survey	1.307	—	26,8	1,6	—	6,8	60,6	4,2	—	33,8
1-15 Mar	ADA	1.500	—	39,1	—	—	—	51,4	9,5	—	12,3
23 Şub-6 Mar	MAK	1.080	—	42	2	1	—	45	4	5	3
2024
31 Mar 2019	Yerel seçimler	371.334	56,2	38,5	1,8	1,1	—	—	2,4	—	17,7

=== Şanlıurfa ===
Date	Pollster	Sample	AKP	SP	YRP	DEM	CHP	İYİ	HÜDA	Others	Undecided	Lead
12-26 Mar	Avrasya	?	36,1	—	30,2	—	—	—	—	33,7	—	5,9
21-25 Mar	Areda Survey	2.776	36,9	—	29,6	27,8	1,1	—	—	4,6	—	7,3
21-25 Mar	SAROS	2.328	40,7	—	24,3	27,8	—	3,8	—	3,4	—	12,9
16-21 Mar	ASAL	1.500	36,6	—	32	22,6	3,2	—	3,4	2,2	—	4,6
1-15 Mar	ADA	1.500	36,9	—	35,2	22,3	—	—	—	5,6	—	1,7
23 Şub-6 Mar	MAK	2.420	32	1	29	24	5	2	—	3	4	3
2024
31 Mar 2019	Yerel seçimler	848.816	61,8	36,3	—	—	—	—	—	1,9	—	25,5

== İç Anadolu ==
=== Ankara ===
Date	Pollster	Sample	CHP	AKP	İYİ	YRP	ZP	DEM	Others	Lead
29 Mar	BETİMAR	3.060	61,2	28,9	1,4	3,9	2,4	1,4	0,8	32,3
27-29 Mar	Özdemir	2.500	58,6	33,9	—	3,2	—	—	4,3	24,7
Mar	HBS	2.100	43,2	36,1	4,3	4	2,7	1	2,4	7,1
26-27 Mar	TÜSİAR	2.462	45,1	37,2	4,1	3,7	2,5	3,3	4,2	7,8
25-27 Mar	ORC	3.420	51,5	36,2	3,9	2,6	2	2,1	1,7	15,3
20-26 Mar	ALF	3.850	55,4	35,1	3,1	—	—	—	6,4	20,3
20-26 Mar	ASAL	2.500	54,4	33,8	3,2	2,4	1,2	2,8	2,2	20,6
23-26 Mar	AREA	3.009	60,1	30,5	3,4	3,2	1,4	1,1	0,4	29,6
15-26 Mar	ADA	1.500	56,5	33,4	2,3	3,2	2,3	—	2,3	23,1
12-26 Mar	Avrasya	?	50,3	39,7	—	—	—	—	10	10,6
22-25 Mar	ADAMOR	2.593	55,1	32,7	3,7	2,6	0,9	3,9	1,1	22,4
21-25 Mar	Areda Survey	3.608	47	42,9	1,9	3,8	2	1,7	0,6	4,1
20-25 Mar	SAROS	4.047	47,2	39,1	4,9	3,5	—	—	5,3	8,1
17-19 Mar	KODAR	6.321	54	39	1,4	2,4	—	—	3,2	15
10-15 Mar	AREA	4.405	59,1	30,3	4,2	3,3	1,5	1,2	0,4	28,8
21 Şub-3 Mar	MAK	4.300	44	38	3	4	2	2	3,0	6
21-25 Feb	ALF	2.700	41,4	37,5	6,4	2,3	2,1	—	4,1	3,9
7-14 Feb	Özdemir	2.500	62,4	30,2	1,2	2,5	1,4	1,2	1,1	32,2
Feb	HBS	2.180	40,3	35,2	6,1	2,4	2,5	2,6	3	5,1
8-9 Feb	AREA	1.546	54	40,1	1,7	2,3	1,2	—	0,7	13,9
24-26 Jan	ORC	3.800	43,7	40,9	5,2	—	—	—	3,2	2,8
22-23 Jan	AREA	2.006	57	40,1	—	—	—	—	2,9	16,9
Jan	HBS	2.100	36,8	34,3	6,1	3	2,9	3,1	5,1	2,5
2024
14-18 Temmuz	ASAL	2.074	32,3	33,7	8,1	1,8	2,2	4,9	19,0	1,4
2023
31 Mar 2019	Yerel seçimler	3.263.648	50,9	47,1	—	—	—	—	1,8	3,8

==== Beypazarı ====
Date	Pollster	Sample	AKP	İYİ	CHP	ZP	Others	Lead
25-26 Mar	ORC	1.050	33,6	31,2	21,6	5,1	8,5	2,4
2024
31 Mar 2019	Yerel seçimler	31.654	48,3	47,9	—	—	3,8	0,4

==== Etimesgut ====
Date	Pollster	Sample	MHP	CHP	İYİ	YRP	ZP	Others	Lead
Mar	SONAR	2.674	43,7	41,1	5,6	2,5	2	5,1	2,6
2024
31 Mar 2019	Yerel seçimler	332.548	49,5	45,7	—	—	—	4,2	1,8

==== Gölbaşı ====
Date	Pollster	Sample	MHP	İYİ	BBP	CHP	YRP	Others	Lead
Mar	HBS	2.500	31,4	5,4	16,5	37,1	4,1	5,5	5,7
2024
31 Mar 2019	Yerel seçimler	75.782	54,1	39	2,7	—	—	4,2	15,1

==== Kalecik ====
Date	Pollster	Sample	AKP	CHP	MHP	İYİ	YRP	Others	Lead
25-26 Mar	ORC	850	—	20,2	31,2	21,8	19,7	7,1	9,4
2024
31 Mar 2019	Yerel seçimler	9.486	60,5	30,8	—	—	—	29,7	29,7

==== Keçiören ====
Date	Pollster	Sample	AKP	İYİ	YRP	CHP	ZP	Others	Lead
14-18 Mar	SAROS	3.428	27,0	2,5	32,5	31,8	3,8	2,4	5,5
2024
31 Mar 2019	Yerel seçimler	522.213	63,6	30,8	—	—	—	5,6	32,8

==== Sincan ====
Date	Pollster	Sample	AKP	İYİ	YRP	CHP	Others	Lead
25-26 Mar	ORC	1.450	29,1	25,8	20,4	17,4	7,3	3,3
2024
31 Mar 2019	Yerel seçimler	288.268	67,6	26,1	—	—	6,3	41,5

=== Çankırı ===
Date	Pollster	Sample	MHP	AKP	İYİP	CHP	YRP	Others	Undecided	Lead
21-24 Mar	ORC	1.200	53,3	33,1	3,1	4,5	3,5	2,5	—	20,2
23-25 Feb	ALF	1.150	46,4	33,8	4,6	2,7	4,9	1,1	6,5	12,6
2024
31 Mar 2019	Yerel seçimler	41.849	46,9	38,2	8,6	4,7	—	1,7	—	8,7

=== Eskişehir ===
Date	Pollster	Sample	CHP	AKP	İYİ	ZP	Others	Undecided	Lead
28 Mar	BETİMAR	4.080	47,3	38,1	4,3	3,9	6,4	—	9,2
25-26 Mar	ORC	1.710	43,6	38,9	8,9	3,5	5,1	—	4,7
12-26 Mar	Avrasya	?	43,1	40,5	—	—	16,4	—	2,6
21-25 Mar	Areda Survey	2.686	42,9	40,1	7,8	3	6,3	—	2,8
1-15 Mar	ADA	1.500	41,9	44,3	5,4	4,2	4,2	—	2,4
10-14 Mar	ASAL	1.640	42,5	40,6	5,9	4,8	6,2	—	1,9
23 Şub-5 Mar	MAK	1.380	42	43	3	1	5,0	5	1
11-12 Jan	Ank-ar	2.674	36,8	39,3	16,9	2,8	4,2	—	2,5
2024
31 Mar 2019	Yerel seçimler	546.269	52,3	45,1	—	—	2,6	—	7,2

=== Kayseri ===
Date	Pollster	Sample	AKP	İYİP	SP	CHP	YRP	Others	Undecided	Lead
12-26 Mar	Avrasya	?	54,1	—	—	24,1	—	21,8	—	30
21-25 Mar	Areda Survey	2.676	50,7	13,6	—	15,1	11,8	8,7	—	35,6
1-15 Mar	ADA	1.500	52,3	10,9	—	15,1	11,9	9,8	—	37,2
21 Şub-5 Mar	MAK	1.030	60	9	0,5	16	4	5,5	5	44
21-25 Feb	ALF	2.000	55,9	14	—	14,5	—	5,5	13,7	41,4
3-19 Feb	Optimar	7.000	54,6	13,2	2,4	13,6	9,9	6,6	—	41
2024
31 Mar 2019	Yerel seçimler	789.750	63,6	31,6	2,8	—	—	2	—	32

=== Kırıkkale ===
Date	Pollster	Sample	AKP	MHP	İYİ	CHP	Others	Undecided	Lead
16-17 Mar	Bey Ajans	3.500	25,4	34,3	3,4	32,6	5	—	1,7
22-24 Feb	ALF	1.503	31,8	20,3	8,4	25,7	3,7	10,1	6,1
2024
31 Mar 2019	Yerel seçimler	108.449	42	23,5	31,7	—	2,8	—	10,3

=== Konya ===
Date	Pollster	Sample	AKP	İYİ	YRP	CHP	DEM	MHP	Others	Undecided	Lead
12-26 Mar	Avrasya	?	52,3	—	16,7	—	—	—	31	—	35,6
21-25 Mar	Areda Survey	2.497	61,8	8,4	10,7	6,5	2,8	—	9,8	—	51,1
22-24 Mar	TÜSİAR	2.462	52,6	2,4	26,2	8,5	—	—	10,3	—	26,4
1-15 Mar	ADA	1.500	54,9	3,7	19,4	9,6	—	—	12,4	—	35,5
21 Şub-5 Mar	MAK	1.630	57	7	9	11	3	—	9,0	5	46
2024
Ekim	TÜSİAR	7.119	41,3	5,1	11,7	6,5	0,3	9,7	17,3	8	29,6
Eylül	ASAL	1.246	50,5	7	4,5	11,3	3,8	10,2	3	5,1	39,2
2023
31 Mar 2019	Yerel seçimler	1.218.037	70,5	20,2	—	—	—	—	9,3	—	50,3

=== Nevşehir ===
Date	Pollster	Sample	AKP	MHP	İYİ	CHP	Others	Undecided	Lead
20-23 Mar	ORC	1.500	26,8	14,1	34,6	13,5	11	—	7,8
18-21 Mar	ALF	1.350	28,2	13,1	44,6	8,5	5,6	—	16,4
2-4 Mar	ORC	1.120	24,1	19,8	30,6	15,2	2,5	7,8	6,5
2024
31 Mar 2019	Yerel seçimler	58.212	51,5	34,3	10,3	—	3,9	—	17,2

=== Niğde ===
Date	Pollster	Sample	AKP	İYİ	MHP	CHP	YRP	Others	Lead
26-27 Mar	TÜSİAR	1.673	41,1	12,2	18,3	17,1	6,5	4,8	22,8
21-23 Feb	Optimar	1.500	54,3	14	14,9	13,5	2,2	2,5	39,4
2024
31 Mar 2019	Yerel seçimler	75.490	37,1	28,1	18,5	14,6	—	1,7	9

==== Bor ====
Date	Pollster	Sample	AKP	MHP	İYİ	CHP	Others	Lead
21 Mar	ORC	1.160	40,7	46,3	—	8,5	4,5	5,6
2024
31 Mar 2019	Yerel seçimler	23.423	43,9	38	9,1	—	9	5,9

=== Sivas ===
Date	Pollster	Sample	AKP	BBP	CHP	MHP	İYİ	YRP	Others	Lead
21-25 Mar	Optimar	1.000	32,5	38,8	8,2	15,7	—	3,7	1,1	6,3
19-21 Mar	ORC	1.400	36,2	28,9	13,8	11,2	5,8	—	4,1	7,3
2024
31 Mar 2019	Yerel seçimler	189.036	49,3	36,4	7,7	4,7	—	—	1,9	12,9

== Karadeniz ==
=== Bolu ===
Date	Pollster	Sample	CHP	AKP	MHP	İYİ	YRP	Others	Lead
Mar	SONAR	4.015	56,2	29,1	10,2	1,8	1,4	1,3	27,1
14-17 Mar	Ank-ar	1.530	55,8	21,9	12,7	3,9	2,4	3,3	33,9
2024
31 Mar 2019	Yerel seçimler	94.288	52,7	44,7	—	—	—	2,6	8

=== Düzce ===
Date	Pollster	Sample	AKP	İYİ	MHP	YRP	IND	Others	Lead
21-23 Mar	ORC	1.150	35,5	10,6	11,3	23,5	14,5	4,6	12
2024
31 Mar 2019	Yerel seçimler	93.973	47,1	27,9	21,7	—	—	3,3	19,2

=== Giresun ===
Date	Pollster	Sample	AKP	CHP	YRP	İYİ	Others	Lead
21-23 Mar	KODAR	1.926	46,5	41,9	4,1	3,4	4,1	4,6
19-22 Mar	Ank-Ar	1.506	43,2	44	2,8	5,1	4,1	0,8
2024
31 Mar 2019	Yerel seçimler	62.185	48,8	48,3	—	—	2,7	0,5

=== Ordu ===
Date	Pollster	Sample	AKP	CHP	İYİ	YRP	Others	Undecided	Lead
29 Mar	Özdemir	2.174	36,6	12,2	41,3	—	6,9	—	4,7
15-26 Mar	ADA	1.500	46,7	17,8	33,2	—	2,3	—	13,5
12-26 Mar	Avrasya	?	45	—	28,1	—	26,9	—	16,9
21-25 Mar	Areda Survey	2.194	37,3	18,6	39	2,1	3	—	1,7
Mar	HBS	2.400	31,8	15,2	38,6	6,1	1,9	6,4	6,8
18-24 Mar	ALF	2.200	36,7	11,7	39,3	5,3	7	—	2,6
20-22 Mar	Pollstar	3.000	34,3	18	39,4	2,5	5,8	—	5,1
14-19 Mar	DENGE	2.000	47,8	16,8	33,2	1,3	0,9	—	14,6
11-14 Mar	KODAR	5.222	37,6	13,5	41,3	—	3,5	4,1	3,7
6-12 Mar	ASAL	1.500	40,5	12,6	41,6	2,1	3,2	—	1,1
Mar	HBS	1.100	28,8	14,9	34,1	4,8	5,6	11,8	5,3
24 Şub-6 Mar	MAK	1.180	36	12	39	2	6,0	5	3
20-28 Feb	ADA	7.500	51,8	14,4	29,7	3,2	0,9	—	22,1
24-27 Feb	ORC	1.930	30,7	19,2	33,2	4,1	3	9,8	2,5
2024
31 Mar 2019	Yerel seçimler	474.904	56,9	15,4	—	—	—	—	30,8

==== Altınordu ====
Date	Pollster	Sample	AKP	CHP	İYİ	YRP	Others	Undecided	Lead
Mar	HBS	1.100	34,2	38,3	13,8	5,1	2,1	6,5	3,9
2024
31 Mar 2019	Yerel seçimler	115.617	50,5	42,7	—	—	6,8	—	7,8

=== Samsun ===
Date	Pollster	Sample	AKP	İYİ	CHP	YRP	Others	Undecided	Lead
Mar	HBS	1.100	47	16	23,7	5,3	1,6	6,4	23,3
Mar	ALF	2.500	41	31,3	12,5	10,4	4,8	—	9,7
Mar	SONAR	3.324	39,3	24,6	23,8	8,6	3,7	—	14,7
12-26 Mar	Avrasya	?	49,8	—	23,4	—	26,8	—	26,4
21-25 Mar	Areda Survey	2.209	48,9	11,5	28	8,1	3,5	—	20,9
17 Mar	KODAR	4.028	46,5	11,4	27,6	8,8	5,7	—	18,9
2-6 Mar	ASAL	1.600	42	16,9	26,4	9,6	5,1	—	15,6
1-5 Mar	ADA	1.500	47,1	14,6	27,1	9,2	2	—	20,0
23 Şub-5 Mar	MAK	2.050	45	18	20	5	7	5	25
Feb	SONAR	3.830	49,5	21,1	19,1	6,1	4,4	—	28,4
24-27 Feb	ORC	2.290	35,2	27,1	20,9	4,3	2,8	4,7	8,1
2024
31 Mar 2019	Yerel seçimler	793.971	50,5	28,4	—	—	21,1	—	22,1

==== Alaçam ====
Date	Pollster	Sample	MHP	DP	CHP	YRP	İYİ	Others	Lead
15-18 Mar	ALF	980	35,4	—	38,7	17,2	5,2	3,5	3,3
2024
31 Mar 2019	Yerel seçimler	17.401	51,6	31,2	13,7	—	—	3,5	20,4

==== Atakum ====
Date	Pollster	Sample	CHP	AKP	İYİ	YRP	ZP	TİP	Others	Undecided	Lead
16-18 Mar	ALF	1.400	33,1	27,1	34,5	2,6	1,7	1,0	—	—	1,4
2024
31 Mar 2019	Yerel seçimler	111.742	48,4	47,4	—	—	—	—	—	4,2	1

==== Havza ====
Date	Pollster	Sample	AKP	CHP	YRP	İYİ	Others	Lead
17-20 Mar	ALF	1.010	50,4	27,1	12,6	5,8	4,1	23,3
2024
31 Mar 2019	Yerel seçimler	26.060	55,9	28,8	—	—	15,3	27,1

==== İlkadım ====
Date	Pollster	Sample	İYİ	AKP	CHP	YRP	ZP	Others	Undecided	Lead
Mar	HBS	1.500	34,6	35	16,3	6,1	—	3	5	0,4
17-20 Mar	ALF	1.300	38,7	35,0	17,2	—	4,5	4,6	—	3,7
2024
31 Mar 2019	Yerel seçimler	183.842	50,9	44,6	—	—	—	4,5	—	6,3

=== Sinop ===
Date	Pollster	Sample	CHP	AKP	İYİ	YRP	Others	Lead
Mar	GENAR	?	40,8	42,8	10,7	3,1	2,6	2
14-15 Mar	Ank-ar	1.206	46,1	35,8	10,2	2,1	5,8	10,3
2024
31 Mar 2019	Yerel seçimler	29.330	56,6	40,4	—	—	3	16,2

=== Trabzon ===
Date	Pollster	Sample	AKP	İYİ	CHP	YRP	Others	Undecided	Lead
12-26 Mar	Avrasya	?	49,3	—	22,1	—	28,6	—	27,2
21-25 Mar	Areda Survey	2.039	57,8	8,2	23,6	5,2	5,2	—	34,2
1-15 Mar	ADA	1.500	63,4	3,7	23,1	7,9	1,9	—	40,3
3 Mar	KODAR	4.337	57	8,2	24,1	7,7	3	—	32,9
22 Şub-5 Mar	MAK	1.230	55	9	15	6	10,0	5	40
24 Şub-1 Mar	ASAL	1.280	58,5	8,5	23	6,1	3,9	—	35,5
Mar	GENAR	?	67	3,4	20,5	6,4	2,7	—	46,5
24-27 Feb	ORC	1.650	43,9	15,5	20,6	5,4	3,5	11,1	23,4
2024
31 Mar 2019	Yerel seçimler	475.451	64,6	29,5	—	—	5,9	—	35,1

=== Tokat ===
Date	Pollster	Sample	AKP	MHP	İYİ	CHP	YRP	Others	Lead
Mar	KODAR	1,878	37,3	44,7	2,4	11,0	3,4	1,2	7,4
2024									
31 Mar 2019	Yerel seçimler	83.152	48,8	28,0	20,4	—	—	—	20,8

=== Zonguldak ===
Date	Pollster	Sample	AKP	CHP	YRP	İYİ	MHP	Others	Lead
14 Mar	KODAR	1.428	39,5	43,8	6,2	5,8	—	4,7	4,3
2024
31 Mar 2019	Yerel seçimler	59.095	42,5	39,1	—	—	15,0	3,2	3,4

== Marmara ==
=== Balıkesir ===
Date	Pollster	Sample	AKP	İYİ	CHP	DEM	YRP	Others	Undecided	Lead
25-27 Mar	ORC	1.790	42	13,4	39,4	—	—	5,2	—	2,6
12-26 Mar	Avrasya	?	41,8	—	43,6	—	—	14,6	—	1,8
22-25 Mar	SAROS	1.947	41,3	5,8	45,1	—	—	7,8	—	3,8
22-25 Mar	İVEM	1.934	44,2	4,6	45,1	—	2,1	4,0	—	0,9
21-25 Mar	Areda Survey	2.182	43,9	8,1	41,9	—	2,4	3,7	—	2
Mar	GENAR	?	45,4	7,4	42,4	—	1,7	3,1	—	3
14-18 Mar	Aksoy	2.400	43,2	2,9	49	0,7	2	2,2	—	5,8
1-15 Mar	ADA	1.500	43,7	4,5	46,2	—	—	5,6	—	2,5
24 Şub-5 Mar	MAK	990	40	11	34	5	—	3	5	6
Mar	SONAR	3.851	47,1	4	42,8	1,5	1	3,6	—	4,3
Mar	HBS	1.800	42,7	10,6	40,1	—	3,9	2,7	—	2,6
16-24 Feb	ASAL	1.080	42,5	6,5	40,4	1,5	1,7	7,4	—	2,1
2-3 Feb	Gezici	8.124	42,1	3,9	47,2	0,6	3,2	3,	—	5,1
2024
17-20 Dec	ALF	1.900	37,5	9,8	44,2	3,4	—	5,1	—	6,7
2023
31 Mar 2019	Yerel seçimler	785.432	47,8	46,5	–	—	—	5,7	—	1,3

==== Altıeylül ====
Date	Pollster	Sample	AKP	CHP	IND	İYİ	YRP	Others	Lead
Mar	SONAR	2.866	29,3	23,8	31,9	9	4,3	1,7	2,6
2024
31 Mar 2019	Yerel seçimler	110.887	54,7	40,3	—	—	—	5	14,4

=== Bilecik ===
Date	Pollster	Sample	CHP	AKP	BBP	İYİ	Others	Undecided	Lead
11-15 Mar	ALF	1.280	40,7	39,2	5,1	3,8	2,9	8,3	1,5
2024
31 Mar 2019	Yerel seçimler	32.512	50,6	42	5	—	2,4	—	8,6

=== Bursa ===
Date	Pollster	Sample	AKP	CHP	İYİ	YRP	ZP	DEM	Others	Lead
27-29 Mar	Özdemir	2.400	38,9	45,8	2,7	5,5	4,1	—	3,0	6,9
22-26 Mar	ALF	3.400	41,6	44,4	2,3	4,7	—	—	7	2,8
12-26 Mar	Avrasya	?	41,1	42,5	—	—	—	—	16,4	1,4
21-25 Mar	Areda Survey	2.416	42,6	41,3	3,3	5,8	2,5	1,6	2,6	1,3
18-25 Mar	SAROS	2.918	43,8	40,2	6,1	5,2	—	—	4,7	3,6
21-23 Mar	İVEM	1.945	43,1	40,9	4,9	4,7	2,8	—	4,0	2,2
18-21 Mar	Aksoy	2.400	39,5	48,8	1,4	3,9	2,5	1,9	2,1	9,3
17-20 Mar	ORC	7.140	41,6	38,5	3,9	6,2	2,7	2,2	4,9	3,5
15-18 Mar	Pollstar	4.700	38,2	45,0	5,7	6,0	—	—	5,1	6,8
12-17 Mar	ASAL	1.400	39,5	41,2	3	5,3	3,5	2,3	5,2	1,7
1-15 Mar	ADA	1.500	43,3	40,6	3,2	5,3	3,9	—	3,7	2,7
11-14 Mar	Aksoy	1.067	38,8	45,2	2,6	4,1	3,4	2,1	3,8	6,4
1-14 Mar	ALF	9.700	38,4	37,1	3,6	6,5	1,9	—	7,1	1,3
21 Şub-5 Mar	MAK	2.370	45	41	2	1	1	2	3,0	4
20-24 Feb	Özdemir	2.363	35,8	47,5	2,9	5,8	4,7	2,2	1,1	11,7
26-29 Jan	ORC	5.200	38,3	41,4	5,4	2,1	—	—	2,5	3,1
2024
31 Mar 2019	Yerel seçimler	1.810.393	49,6	47	—	—	—	—	3,4	2,6

==== Gemlik ====
Date	Pollster	Sample	CHP	AKP	İYİ	ZP	YRP	Others	Undecided	Lead
8-13 Mar	ALF	1.430	39,2	37,5	8,9	3,4	2,9	2,2	3,9	1,7
2024
31 Mar 2019	Yerel seçimler	68.546	47,2	42,3	—	—	—	10,5	—	4,9

==== İnegöl ====
Date	Pollster	Sample	AKP	İYİ	SP	CHP	YRP	Others	Lead
17-20 Mar	ORC	1.290	53,1	5,2	6,5	17,4	13,6	2,5	35,7
2024
31 Mar 2019	Yerel seçimler	154.536	63,5	22,6	8,1	—	—	5,8	40,9

==== İznik ====
Date	Pollster	Sample	AKP	İYİ	YRP	CHP	Others	Undecided	Lead
17-20 Mar	ORC	1.150	31,7	13,8	35,1	15,9	3,5	6,4	3,2
8-13 Mar	ALF	1.150	30,4	9,4	32,5	19,5	1,8	—	2,1
2024
31 Mar 2019	Yerel seçimler	29.739	50,7	45,8	—	—	3,5	—	4,9

==== Mudanya ====
Date	Pollster	Sample	CHP	AKP	İYİ	ZP	YRP	Others	Lead
17-20 Mar	ORC	1.350	36,1	34,9	13,5	5,2	3,5	6,8	1,2
2024
31 Mar 2019	Yerel seçimler	62.978	53,4	41,8	—	—	—	3,4	11,6

==== Nilüfer ====
Date	Pollster	Sample	CHP	AKP	İYİ	ZP	YRP	Others	Lead
17-20 Mar	ORC	1.620	47,8	36	4,7	3,8	3,5	4,2	11,8
2024
31 Mar 2019	Yerel seçimler	267.881	62,1	35,1	—	—	—	2,8	27

==== Osmangazi ====
Date	Pollster	Sample	AKP	CHP	İYİ	YRP	ZP	DEM	Others	Undecided	Lead
8-13 Mar	ALF	2.260	40,8	34,4	7,5	2,6	2,5	2,2	1,7	8,3	6,4
2024
31 Mar 2019	Yerel seçimler	519.846	50,5	45,5	—	—	—	—	4	—	5

==== Yenişehir ====
Date	Pollster	Sample	MHP	İYİ	CHP	YRP	DEM	ZP	Others	Undecided	Lead
8-13 Mar	ALF	1.290	43,2	8,3	25	6,2	4,5	2,8	1,5	8,5	18,2
2024
31 Mar 2019	Yerel seçimler	34.687	47,9	40,1	—	—	—	—	12	—	7,8

=== Çanakkale ===
Date	Pollster	Sample	CHP	AKP	İYİ	Others	Undecided	Lead
21-24 Mar	ALF	1.560	35,1	18,4	38,5	8	—	3,4
20-23 Mar	ORC	1.500	35,7	17,6	38,1	8,6	—	2,4
Mar	Bulgu	1.200	40,6	29,7	23,8	6,0	—	10,9
6-9 Mar	ORC	1.360	33,1	21,7	34,2	3	8	1,2
2024
31 Mar 2019	Yerel seçimler	76.037	60,7	35,6	—	3,7	—	25,1

=== Edirne ===
Date	Pollster	Sample	CHP	AKP	İYİ	Others	Undecided	Lead
Mar	GENAR	?	32,3	46,5	15,8	4,9	—	14,2
22-24 Mar	ORC	1.480	22,2	35,2	37,3	5,3	—	2,1
21-23 Mar	ALF	1.455	21	35,5	38,9	4,6	—	3,4
Mar	Ank-Ar	2.125	21	29,2	28,4	8,5	12,9	0,8
9-11 Mar	Gezici	?	45,6	38,7	11,7	4,0	—	6,9
7-8 Mar	ORC	1.340	23,7	30,3	28,0	12,6	5,4	2,3
2024
31 Mar 2019	Yerel seçimler	94.471	44,9	40,8	—	14,3	—	4,1

=== İstanbul ===
Date	Pollster	Sample	CHP	AKP	DEM	İYİ	YRP	ZP	Others	Undecided	Lead
30 Mar	BETİMAR	5.729	48,0	38,3	3,2	1,6	4,0	3,5	1,4	—	9,7
29-30 Mar	Areda Survey	10.983	42,2	42,9	4,6	1,8	3,5	3	2	—	0,7
27-29 Mar	Özdemir	2.736	44,9	38,4	4,3	2,8	4,4	3,2	2,0	—	6,5
Mar	HBS	2.900	44,1	40,4	2,8	3,3	3	3,1	2	1,3	3,7
26-29 Mar	SONAR	4.288	47,3	40,4	2,9	2,1	3,1	3,0	1,2	—	6,9
27-28 Mar	Aksoy	2.400	49,9	36,9	3	0,8	3,5	3,3	2,6	—	13
25-28 Mar	İVEM	3.006	48,1	40,2	3,4	2,4	2,6	1,7	1,6	—	7,9
24-28 Mar	ORC	4.350	42,4	41,3	3,5	3,3	3,6	2,7	3,2	—	1,1
26-27 Mar	TÜSİAR	3.317	41,5	42,3	2,9	2,2	3,3	2,9	4,9	—	0,8
22-27 Mar	ASAL	3.000	43,3	40,1	3,8	2,6	3,1	2,9	4,2	—	3,2
25-26 Mar	Algoritma	2.400	48,2	38,1	2,6	1,3	3,5	3,3	3	—	10,1
24-26 Mar	Metropoll	2.100	48,6	37	4,1	2	3,3	3,5	1,5	—	11,6
23-26 Mar	Ser-Ar	2.024	49,1	37,7	3,1	0,8	5,1	3,2	1	—	11,4
23-26 Mar	Area	3.038	42,8	40	4	3,5	6,2	3,2	0,3	—	2,8
21-26 Mar	ALF	4.200	41,9	39,1	3,6	2,8	5,2	3,9	3,5	—	2,8
20-26 Mar	SAROS	5.012	44,1	41,3	4,6	4,3	3,8	—	1,9	—	2,8
12-26 Mar	Avrasya	?	46,2	39,1	—	—	—	—	14,7	—	7,1
22-25 Mar	ADAMOR	2.593	38,6	37,1	7	7,3	4,5	3,7	1,8	—	1,5
21-23 Mar	PanoramaTr	?	44,7	37,5	4,3	1,7	3,7	4,5	3,6	—	7,2
16-20 Mar	Optimar	3.000	43,2	43,6	5,2	1,8	1,7	2,3	2,2	—	0,4
17-18 Mar	Yöneylem	2.394	44,5	40,3	4,4	3	3,6	2,9	1,3	—	4,2
15-18 Mar	Metropoll	1.663	39,2	30,4	3,2	1,6	2,4	2	3,1	18,1	8,8
15-18 Mar	Pollstar	4.700	42,5	40,1	5,5	5,1	—	—	6,8	—	2,4
15-17 Mar	Gezici	5.868	41,6	42,3	5,9	2,5	4,3	0,6	2,8	—	0,7
10-17 Mar	ASPAM	4.500	41,2	43,3	4,8	4,1	3,2	1,6	1,8	—	2,1
1-15 Mar	ADA	2.500	43,6	42,7	4,2	—	—	—	9,5	—	0,9
11-13 Mar	KODAR	7.554	42,7	43,4	3,8	2,4	2,8	—	4,9	—	0,7
4-8 Mar	Artıbir	2.000	38,2	35,7	4,8	3,4	2,6	—	4,5	10,3	2,5
1-5 Mar	Ser-Ar	2.600	43,1	39,4	5,1	2,2	5,3	3,2	1,7	—	3,7
21 Şub-4 Mar	ALF	4.400	37,8	36,9	4,6	4,3	4	4,1	3,1	5,2	0,9
2-3 Mar	KONDA	2.489	46,1	38,8	—	—	—	—	15,1	—	7,3
21 Şub-3 Mar	MAK	5.700	41,5	40	3	4	2,5	2	5	—	1,5
Mar	HBS	2.400	40,3	38,1	3,8	3,9	3,7	3,2	1,3	5,7	2,2
Mar	HBS	2.100	42,3	40,6	4,2	5,1	2,5	2,9	2,4	—	1,7
22-27 Feb	SAROS	2.127	45,4	40,2	3,4	4,4	3,7	—	2,9	—	5,2
23-27 Feb	ASAL	2.000	41,9	40,8	4,5	3,6	2,9	2,5	3,8	—	1,1
23-24 Feb	Özdemir	2.004	42,5	37	5,6	4,8	4,1	3,4	2,6	—	5,5
21-24 Feb	Optimar	3.000	42	42,4	4,1	2,2	3,4	3,6	2,3	—	0,4
21-22 Feb	Metropoll	1.664	43,5	40,2	6,1	3,1	2,3	2,5	2,3	—	3,3
18-21 Feb	TÜSİAR	3.515	40,3	41,7	4,3	4	3,6	—	6,2	—	1,5
10-12 Feb	ORC	3.920	36,5	37,7	6,8	3,6	2,9	3,7	1,7	7,1	1,2
1-3 Feb	HBS	2.120	44,3	43,1	4,4	3,1	1,4	2	1,7	—	1,2
30 Oca-1 Şuba	Özdemir	2.000	41,5	43,3	8,8	4,9	—	—	1,5	—	1,1
Feb	Gezici	?	43,5	44,1	4,1	1,7	2,3	3,1	1,2	—	0,6
Feb	Pi-Ar	?	32,9	31,7	5,4	5,2	2,8	4,6	4,4	6,9	1,2
Feb	SONAR	?	41,9	41,3	4,8	4	2,5	—	5,5	—	0,6
Feb	HBS	2.925	36,9	38,3	4,8	5,2	1,9	2	1,6	9,3	1,4
Feb	SONAR	?	41,1	40,6	6,5	4,3	2,1	1,3	3,5	—	0,5
Feb	Optimar	?	39,1	37,7	—	5	—	—	9	—	1,4
22-25 Jan	MEDAR	3.018	40,4	40,7	5,3	4,2	3,1	—	6,3	—	0,3
16-19 Jan	Optimar	2.205	46,3	42,1	—	—	—	—	5,9	5,7	4,2
15-18 Jan	ORC	2.950	38,9	37,2	—	4,1	2,5	3,5	2,3	11,5	1,7
12-15 Jan	MetroPOLL	1.565	41,6	38	5,6	2,9	—	—	—	11,9	3,6
9-12 Jan	ASAL	2.500	36,4	32,8	4,4	3	3,8	—	3,4	16,2	3,6
7-9 Jan	Yöneylem	2.400	39,1	32,9	4,8	2,8	3,6	—	2,9	9,7	6,2
1-5 Jan	TÜSİAR	3.812	46,4	48	—	—	—	—	—	5,6	1,6
Jan	HBS	?	42,1	43,2	5,6	3,6	—	—	5,5	—	1,1
2024
Dec	SONAR	?	41,1	39,6	4,8	3,2	—	—	11,3	—	1,5
25 Ara-3 Oca	ORC	5.100	40,8	40,2	—	—	—	—	—	19	0,6
8-13 Temmuz	HBS	3.900	40,1	42,4	5,1	5	—	—	7,4	—	2,3
2-9 Temmuz	ASAL	2.056	38,7	40,6	5,4	4,3	—	—	11,0	—	1,9
1-6 Haziran	Argetus	6.012	42,9	48,5	3,7	1,3	—	—	3,6	—	5,6
2023
23 Haziran 2019	Yenilenen seçim	8.746.566	54,2	45	—	—	—	—	0,3	—	9,2
31 Mar 2019	Yerel seçimler	8.547.074	48,7	48,6	—	—	—	—	1,5	—	0,1

==== Ataşehir ====
Date	Pollster	Sample	CHP	AKP	İYİ	YRP	ZP	MP	Others	Undecided	Lead
26-28 Mar	ORC	1.550	29,5	26,5	26,7	4,2	3,8	2,4	6,9	—	2,8
12-17 Mar	ORC	1.390	29,2	27,8	20,6	—	—	—	5,5	16,9	1,4
25-28 Şub	ALF	1.380	32,6	29,5	17,1	—	—	—	5,1	15,7	3,1
2024
31 Mar 2019	Yerel seçimler	251.920	51,3	45,1	—	—	—	—	3,6	—	6,2

==== Beşiktaş ====
Date	Pollster	Sample	CHP	AKP	İYİ	MHP	DEM	Others	Lead
27-28 Mar	ORC	1.650	60,1	—	13,8	15,1	6,5	5,5	45
2024
31 Mar 2019	Yerel seçimler	110.665	73	16,3	7	—	—	3,7	56,7

==== Beylikdüzü ====
Date	Pollster	Sample	CHP	AKP	YRP	İYİ	Undecided	Others	Lead
21-23 Mar	ALF	1.800	32,8	26,4	31,1	5,8	—	3,9	1,7
18-19 Mar	ORC	1.600	30,5	23,5	29,3	5,8	10	2,9	1,2
2024
31 Mar 2019	Yerel seçimler	190.510	56,3	41,5	—	—	—	2,2	4,3

==== Beyoğlu ====
Date	Pollster	Sample	AKP	CHP	İYİ	YRP	Others	Lead
Mar	SONAR	3.246	51,6	32,7	8,5	2,5	4,7	18,9
2024
31 Mar 2019	Yerel seçimler	130.679	49,8	43,9	—	—	6,3	5,9

==== Büyükçekmece ====
Date	Pollster	Sample	CHP	AKP	ZP	YRP	İYİ	DEM	Others	Lead
Mar	SONAR	3.821	49,2	40,1	2,2	2,1	1,9	1,8	2,7	9,1
2024
31 Mar 2019	Yerel seçimler	144.929	50,3	47,4	—	—	—	—	2,3	2,9

==== Esenler ====
Date	Pollster	Sample	AKP	İYİ	CHP	YRP	ZP	Others	Lead
27-28 Mar	Özdemir	1.931	53,5	3,7	26,3	9,1	5,2	2,2	27,2
2024
31 Mar 2019	Yerel seçimler	245.931	65,4	17,3	—	—	—	17,3	48,1

==== Esenyurt ====
Date	Pollster	Sample	CHP	AKP	İYİ	YRP	Others	Undecided	Lead
26-28 Mar	ORC	2.000	35,7	34,2	16,3	8,5	5,3	—	1,5
12-17 Mar	ORC	1.900	35,2	39,7	3,8	—	5,9	15,4	4,5
2024
31 Mar 2019	Yerel seçimler	441.451	51,5	45,9	—	—	2,6	—	4,3

==== Eyüpsultan ====
Date	Pollster	Sample	AKP	CHP	İYİ	YRP	ZP	Others	Undecided	Lead
27-28 Mar	ORC	1.690	43,1	25,5	17,9	6,5	—	7	—	17,6
12-17 Mar	ORC	1.250	42,4	27,2	12,1	6,2	2,4	2,7	7	15,2
8-9 Mar	Özdemir	3.933	42,7	38	8,9	7,2	—	3,2	—	4,7
26-29 Feb	ALF	1.550	40,8	32,4	11,5	—	—	6,1	9,2	8,4
2024
31 Mar 2019	Yerel seçimler	228.734	49,1	47,4	—	—	—	3,5	—	1,7

==== Fatih ====
Date	Pollster	Sample	AKP	CHP	İYİ	YRP	Others	Undecided	Lead
21 Şub-1 Mar	ALF	1.310	41,8	32,3	6,5	—	4,7	14,8	9,5
12-17 Şub	İstanbul Enstitüsü	2.050	39	38,5	4,5	5	5,3	7,7	0,5
2024
31 Mar 2019	Yerel seçimler	214.923	53	36	4,4	—	6,6	—	17

==== Gaziosmanpaşa ====
Date	Pollster	Sample	AKP	CHP	SP	YRP	DEM	ZP	İYİ	Others	Lead
29 Mar	Özdemir	2.251	42,6	27,0	—	10,9	7,2	4,4	3,5	4,4	15,6
2024
31 Mar 2019	Yerel seçimler	275.040	52,2	33,3	8,9	—	—	—	—	5,6	18,9

==== Güngören ====
Date	Pollster	Sample	AKP	CHP	DEM	İYİ	YRP	Others	Lead
22-25 Mar	ALF	1.850	48	24,7	9,5	7,3	5,8	4,7	23,3
2024
31 Mar 2019	Yerel seçimler	166.275	53,7	37	—	—	—	9,3	16,7

==== Kadıköy ====
Date	Pollster	Sample	CHP	AKP	İYİ	TKP	TİP	Undecided	Others	Lead
12-17 Mar	ORC	1.600	44,2	19,6	4,8	19,1	2,2	7,2	2,9	24,6
26 Şub-2 Mar	ALF	1.700	47,7	15,9	4,8	20,1	—	7,1	4,4	27,6
2024
31 Mar 2019	Yerel seçimler	305.823	65,9	19,5	12,6	—	—	—	2	46,4

==== Kâğıthane ====
Date	Pollster	Sample	AKP	CHP	İYİ	DEM	YRP	Others	Lead
Mar	SONAR	3.714	58.1	25,2	5,2	5,8	3,1	2,6	32,9
Feb	SONAR	3.626	55,5	25,6	5,2	6,7	3	4	29,9
2024
31 Mar 2019	Yerel seçimler	249.572	54.4	—	31.1	—	—	15.5	23,3

==== Maltepe ====
Date	Pollster	Sample	CHP	İYİ	AKP	MHP	Others	Lead
21-24 Mar	ALF	2.000	35,5	29,2	28,4	—	6,9	6,3
2024
31 Mar 2019	Yerel seçimler	298.588	52,7	—	—	42,8	4,5	9,9

==== Pendik ====
Date	Pollster	Sample	AKP	CHP	İYİ	YRP	Others	Lead
26-27 Mar	ORC	1.780	45,8	25,3	15,7	6,8	6,4	20,3
Feb	SONAR	3.611	56,3	32,9	7	2,2	1,6	23,4
2024
31 Mar 2019	Yerel seçimler	398.210	54,7	41,2	—	—	4,1	13,5

==== Sarıyer ====
Date	Pollster	Sample	CHP	AKP	IND	İYİ	TİP	ZP	YRP	Others	Undecided	Lead
Mar	SONAR	2.968	34,5	26,8	27,1	4,6	2,1	—	1,6	3,3	—	7,7
12-17 Mar	ORC	1.200	26,2	31,5	19,6	5,7	—	2,5	2,4	2,9	9,2	5,3
2024
31 Mar 2019	2019 local elections	205.145	55,9	41,4	—	—	—	—	—	2,7	—	14,5

==== Tuzla ====
Date	Pollster	Sample	AKP	CHP	İYİ	YRP	Others	Lead
20-23 Mar	ALF	1.650	38,6	25,3	21,4	8,8	5,9	13,3
2024
31 Mar 2019	Yerel seçimler	146.925	50,5	46,2	—	—	3,3	4,3

==== Ümraniye ====
Date	Pollster	Sample	AKP	CHP	İYİ	DEM	Others	Lead
27-28 Mar	ORC	1.900	47,2	30,1	11,2	6,5	5	17,1
2024
31 Mar 2019	2019 local elections	395.585	54,5	37,5	—		8	17

==== Üsküdar ====
Date	Pollster	Sample	AKP	CHP	İYİ	YRP	Others	Lead
27-28 Mar	ORC	1.830	35,2	41,8	11,5	9,3	2,2	6,6
15-18 Mar	Ank-Ar	2.755	41,8	43,7	4,4	4,1	6	1,9
Feb	SONAR	?	50,4	40,1	3,8	2,6	3,1	10,3
2024
31 Mar 2019	Yerel seçimler	330.179	48,3	45,5	—	—	6,2	2,8

=== Kırklareli ===
Date	Pollster	Sample	IND	MHP	CHP	İYİ	Others	Undecided	Lead
22-26 Jan	Parametre	1.600	—	36,7	40,0	3,6	11,6	8,1	3,3
2024
31 Mar 2019	2019 local elections	45.645	37,5	37	21,1	—	4,4	—	0,5

=== Kocaeli ===
Date	Pollster	Sample	AKP	İYİ	CHP	YRP	DEM	Others	Undecided	Lead
15-26 Mar	ADA	1.500	53,7	8,3	22,9	6,8	4,1	4,2	—	30,8
12-26 Mar	Avrasya	?	44,2	—	36,9	—	—	18,9	—	7,3
21-25 Mar	Areda Survey	3.608	47,8	8,7	23,3	7,3	4,3	8,7	—	24,5
22 Şub-4 Mar	MAK	1.510	47	8	21	7	5	8	5	26
Feb	SONAR	4.318	54,9	6,6	29,6	4,3	1,6	3	—	25,3
18-26 Feb	ASAL	1.385	51,2	6,6	28,5	5,8	2,9	5,0	—	22,7
2024
31 Mar 2019	Yerel seçimler	1.098.319	55,5	32,6	—	—	—	11,9	—	22,9

=== Sakarya ===
Date	Pollster	Sample	AKP	İYİ	CHP	YRP	DEM	Others	Undecided	Lead
Mar	GENAR	?	53,8	5,4	15,9	14,3	—	10,6	—	37,9
12-26 Mar	Avrasya	?	46,8	—	20,3	—	—	32,9	—	26,5
21-25 Mar	Areda Survey	1.730	52,4	11,3	12,1	10,6	—	13,6	—	41,1
1-15 Mar	ADA	1.500	50,8	6	16,3	13,1	—	13,8	—	34,5
6-11 Mar	ASAL	1.200	51,5	5,6	16,6	15	—	11,3	—	34,9
25 Şub-6 Mar	MAK	1.560	57	8	17	7	3	8	—	40
2024
31 Mar 2019	2019 local elections	594.535	65	27,6	—	—	—	7,4	—	37,4

==== Adapazarı ====
Date	Pollster	Sample	AKP	İYİ	CHP	YRP	ZP	Others	Lead
Mar	SONAR	3.660	56	8,5	22,6	7,4	3	2,5	33,4
2024
31 Mar 2019	Yerel seçimler	152.962	57,4	25,1	11,2	—	—	6,3	32,3

=== Tekirdağ ===
Date	Pollster	Sample	CHP	AKP	İYİ	DEM	Others	Undecided	Lead
12-26 Mar	Avrasya	?	47	36,5	—	—	16,5	—	10,5
21-25 Mar	Areda Survey	2.728	44	43,1	4,8	2,3	5,8	—	0,9
1-15 Mar	ADA	1.500	45,4	35,9	—	5,7	13	—	9,5
3-7 Mar	ASAL	1.600	43,5	36,4	6,5	4,2	9,4	—	7,1
23 Şub-6 Mar	MAK	1.700	44	37	3	2	8	5	7
1-21 Jan	NOKTA	9.836	34,1	28,6	10,3	5,9	19,9	1,2	5,5
2024
31 Mar 2019	Yerel seçimler	621.778	51,2	43,8	—	—	5	—	7,4

==== Kapaklı ====
Date	Pollster	Sample	AKP	CHP	YRP	İYİ	Others	Lead
8-9 Mar	BETİMAR	2.751	46	24,8	17,6	6,6	5	5,5
2024
31 Mar 2019	2019 local elections	65.888	53,9	41,1	—	—	5	12,8

=== Yalova ===
Date	Pollster	Sample	CHP	AKP	Others	Undecided	Lead
22-26 Jan	ALF	1.105	36,7	40,4	9,5	13,4	3,7
2024
31 Mar 2019	Yerel seçimler	62.776	45,9	44,9	9,2	—	1
