= 2024 Turkish local elections =

Municipal elections in Turkey

- 31 March 2024

All 81 Provinces of Turkey 30 metropolitan, 922 district and 398 town municipal mayors 1,282 provincial and 21,001 municipal councillors
- Opinion polls
- Turnout: 78.11% (▼6.56 pp)
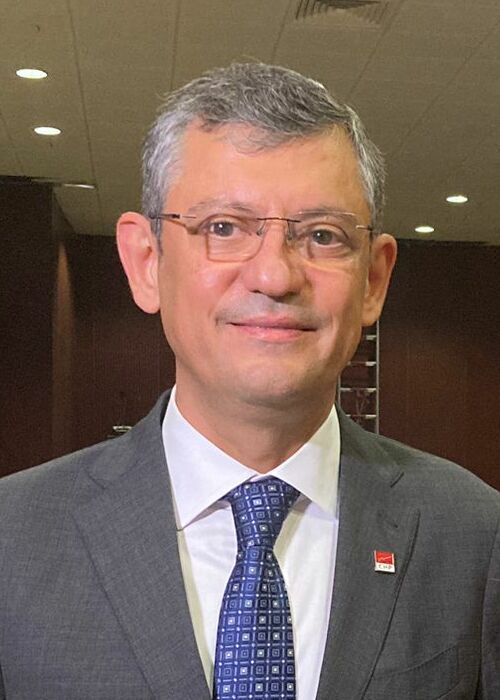

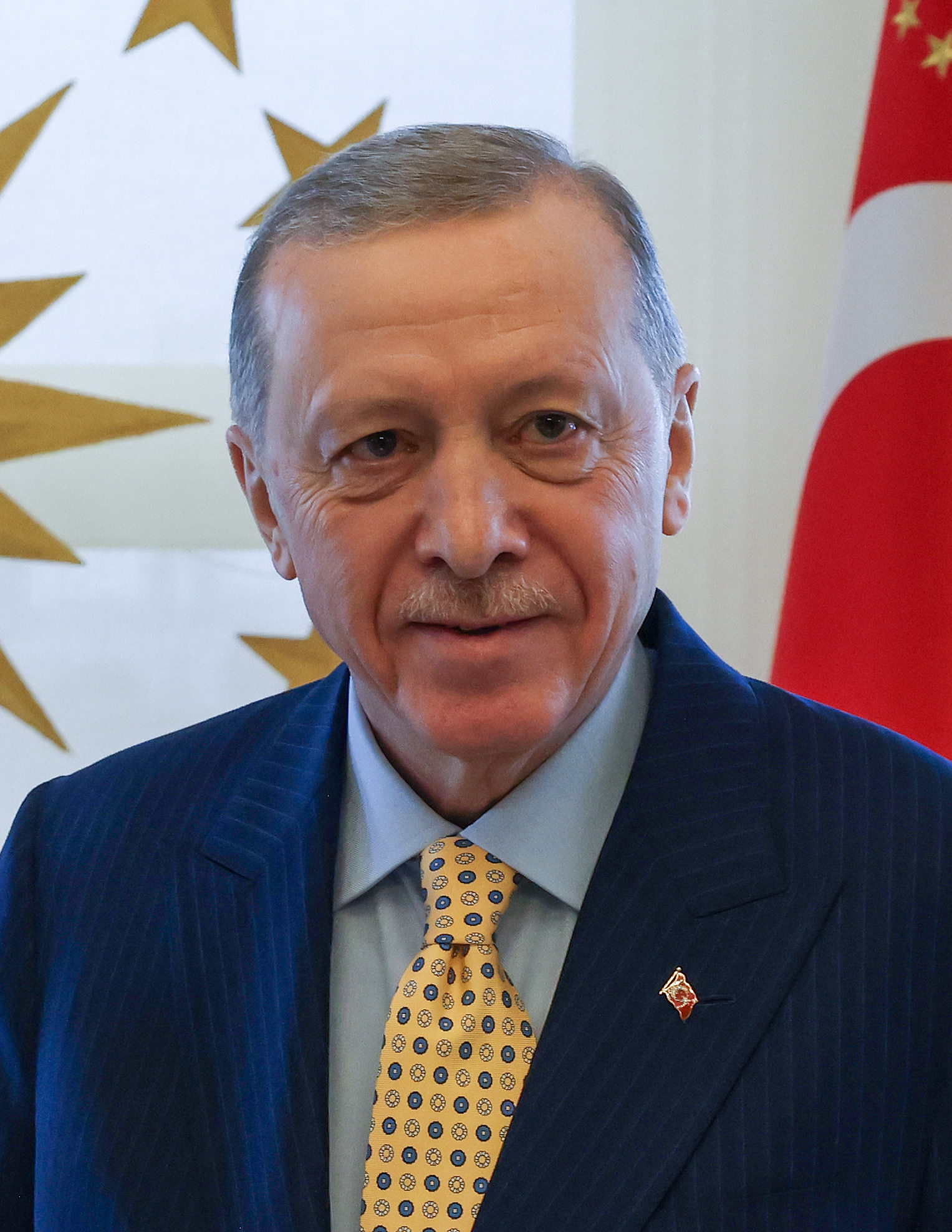

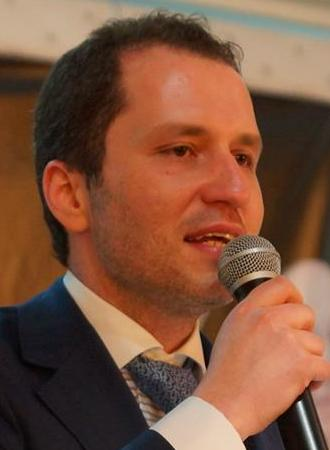

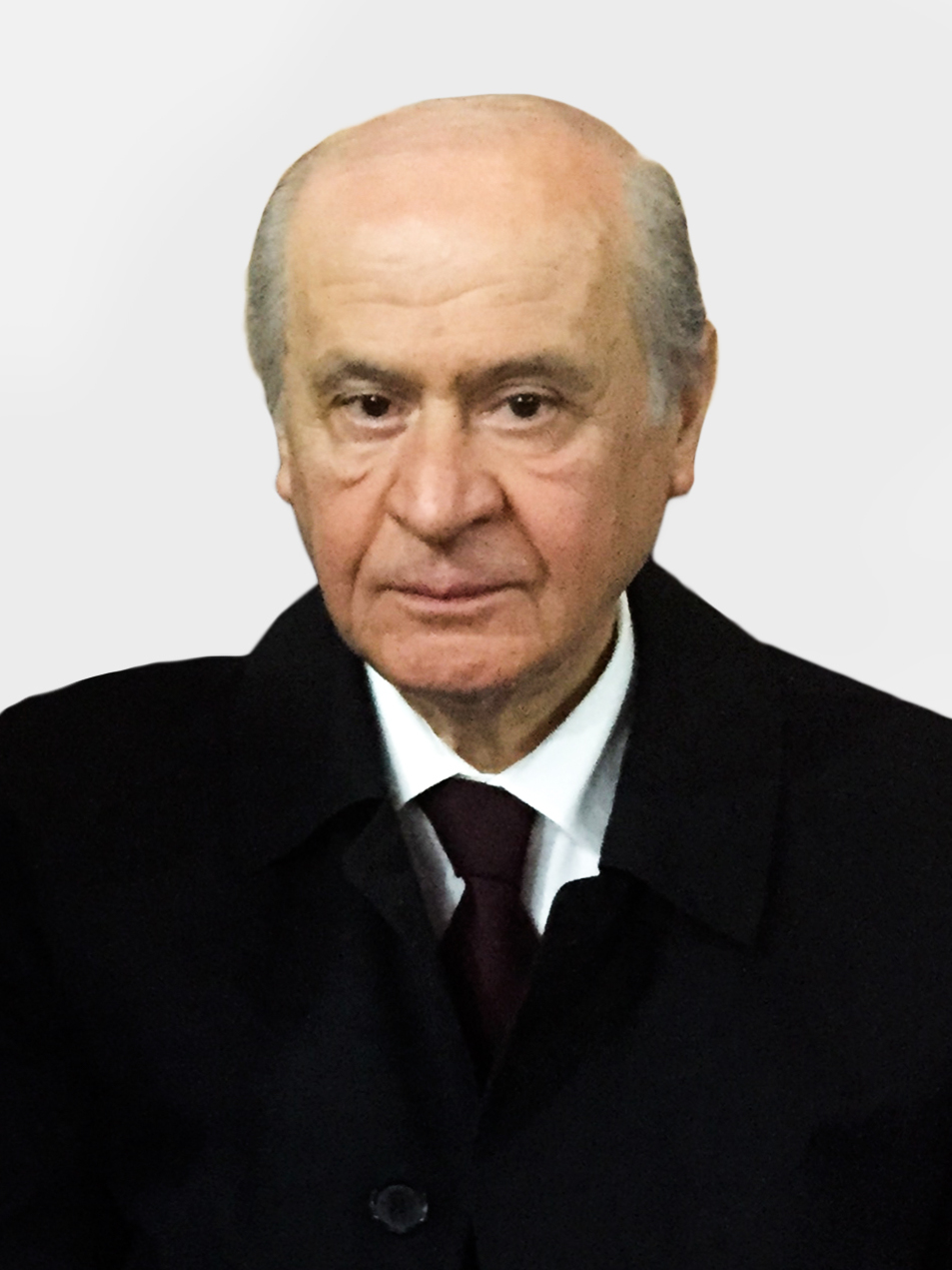

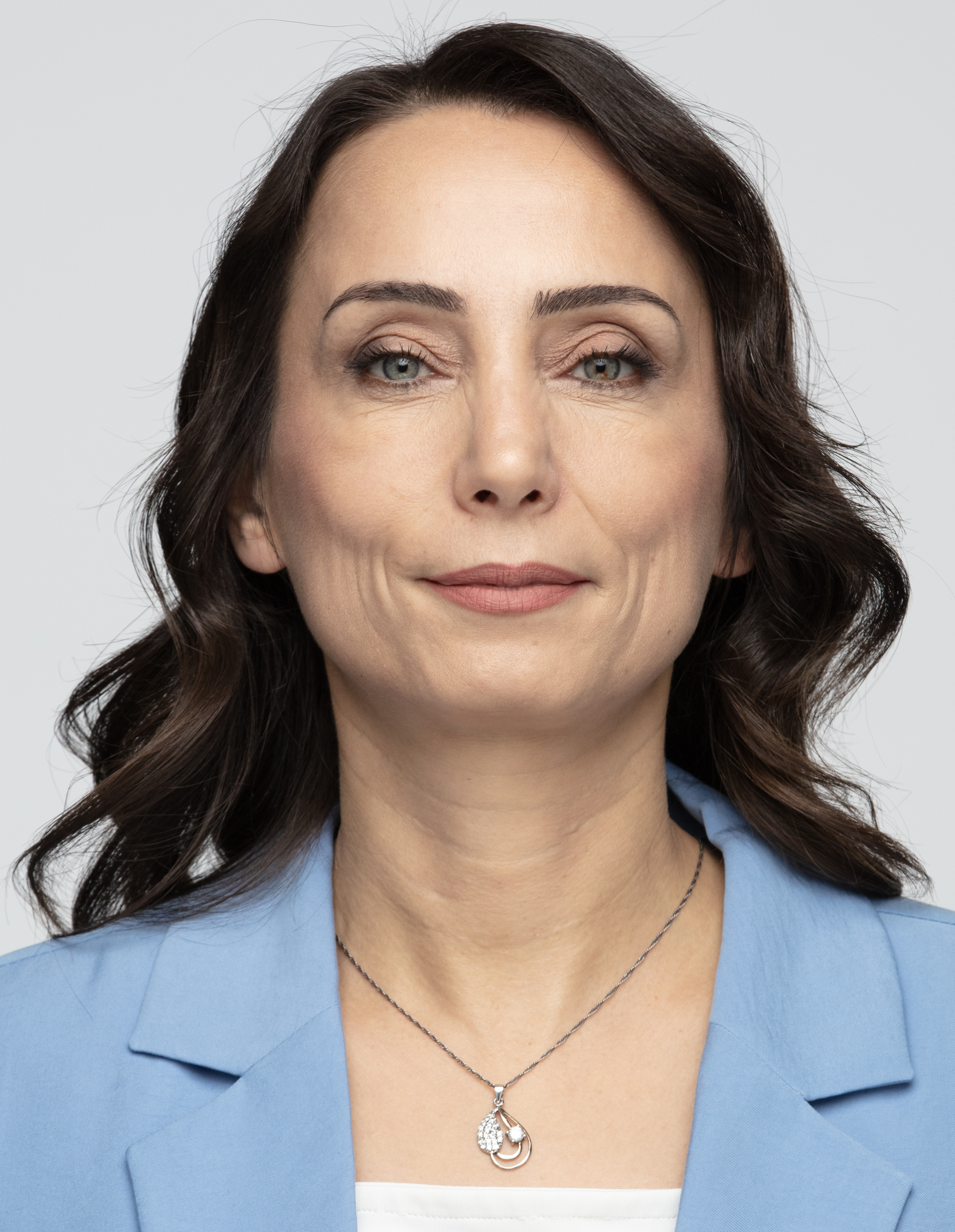

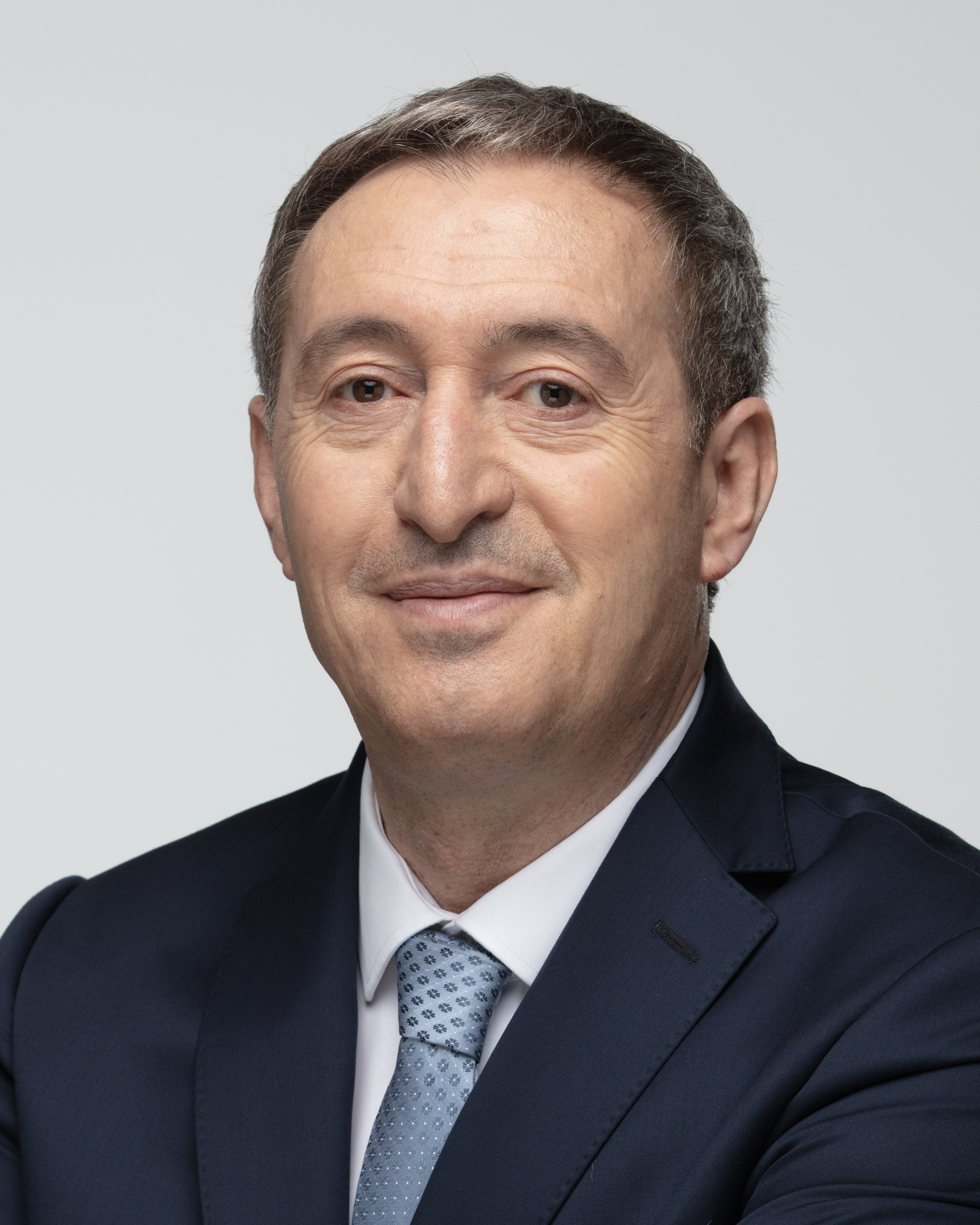

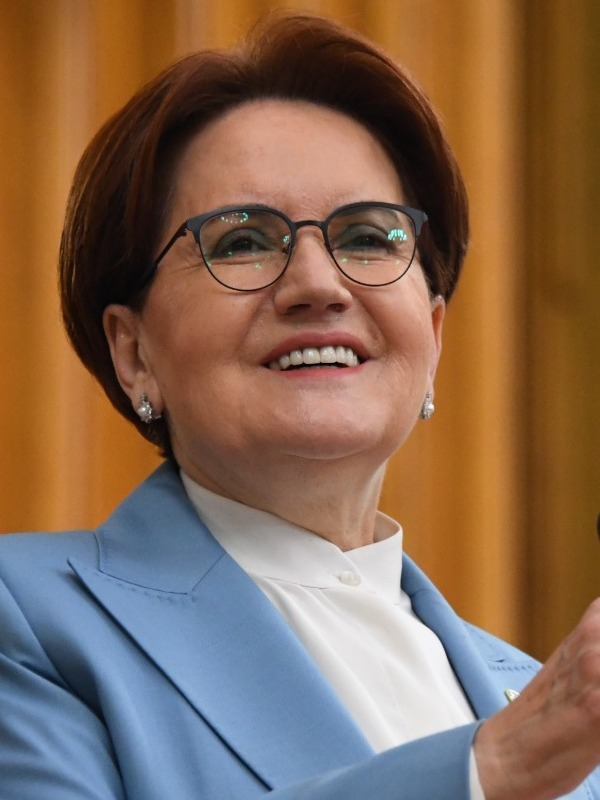
	First party	Second party	Third party
Leader	Özgür Özel	Recep Tayyip Erdoğan	Fatih Erbakan
Party	CHP	AK Party	YRP
Alliance	-	People's Alliance	-
Last election	21 provinces, 29.36%	39 provinces, 42.56%	Did not contest
Provinces (Note: The total number of metropolitan mayoralties (in the 30 metropolitan provinces) plus the provincial capital mayoralties (in the remaining 51 provinces) won by each party.)	35	24	2
Change	▲14	▼15	▲2
Popular vote (Note: Calculated using votes for municipal councillor elections, see official results here)	15,200,699	13,874,511	2,991,882
Percentage	35.48%	32.38%	6.98%
Swing	▲6.12 pp	▼10.18 pp	New
Districts	337	356	39
	Fourth party	Fifth party	Sixth party
Leader	Devlet Bahçeli	Tülay Hatimoğulları Oruç and Tuncer Bakırhan	Meral Akşener
Party	MHP	DEM	İYİ
Alliance	People's Alliance	Labour & Freedom	-
Last election	11 provinces, 7.46%	8 provinces, 5.60% (Note: as HDP)	0 provinces, 7.31%
Provinces	8	10	1
Change	▼3	▲2	▲1
Popular vote	2,508,414	2,409,155	1,967,898
Percentage	5.85%	5.62%	4.59%
Swing	▼1.61 pp	▲0.02 pp	▼2.72 pp
Districts	122	65	24
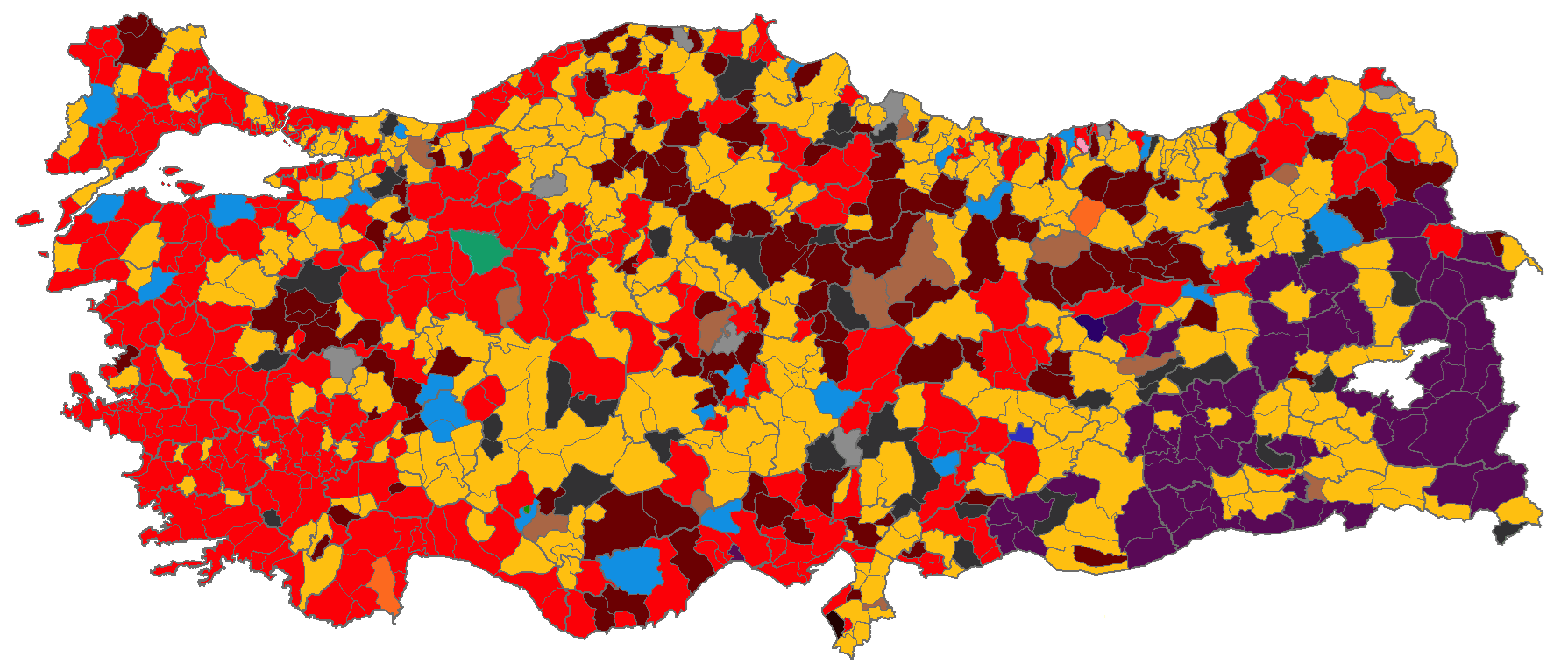
- CHP (35) AK Party (24) DEM (10) MHP (8); YRP (2) İYİ (1) BBP (1) AK Party (356) CHP (337) MHP (122) DEM (65); YRP (39) İYİ (24) BBP (14) DP (2) SP (1) DEVA (1); TİP (1) DSP (1) SOL (1) Independents (8)

Local elections in Turkey took place throughout the country's 81 provinces on 31 March 2024. A total of 30 metropolitan and 1,363 district municipal mayors, alongside 1,282 provincial and 21,001 municipal councilors were elected, in addition to numerous local non-partisan positions such as neighborhood representatives (muhtars) and elderly people's councils.

The elections took place ten months after the 2023 parliamentary and presidential elections, where the Nation Alliance opposition coalition suffered an unexpected defeat to President Recep Tayyip Erdoğan's governing People's Alliance. This was despite an ongoing economic crisis and rapidly rising inflation. Following the defeat, the opposition six-party coalition dissolved, with the main opposition parties Republican People's Party (CHP) and Good Party (İYİ) fielding separate candidates for effectively all mayoral positions. This was the first nationwide election to be contested by the CHP's new leader Özgür Özel, who had successfully challenged his predecessor Kemal Kılıçdaroğlu for the position in November 2023.

The Peoples' Equality and Democracy Party (DEM), which succeeded the Peoples' Democratic Party (HDP) as Turkey's principal Kurdish minority rights party, fielded its own candidates in many western metropoles, despite having previously withdrawn candidates in favor of the Nation Alliance.

The results were described as a "spectacular upset" victory for the opposition CHP, which despite the lack of any electoral pacts managed to retain all but one of its metropolitan mayoralties, while winning four more. In particular, the party's candidates in Turkey's largest city Istanbul and capital Ankara, Ekrem İmamoğlu and Mansur Yavaş, were re-elected by 51% and 60%, respectively. Both mayors also won majorities in their respective metropolitan councils, giving them significantly more powers than their previous terms, and are now seen as potential presidential contenders for the next Turkish presidential election. The CHP also won many unexpected victories in areas that had been under government control for the previous two decades, including Bursa, Balıkesir, Manisa, Kütahya, Adıyaman, Amasya, Kırıkkale, Kilis and Denizli. The party also managed to win swathes of districts within many provinces, many of which delivered vote swings of over 30% in the CHP's favor. Overall, the CHP won 35 of Turkey's 81 provincial capitals, with the People's Alliance winning 32.

This was the first nationwide election since 1977 where the CHP came first in the popular vote, and the first election where the AK Party did not come first since its foundation in 2001. Nevertheless, the AK Party retained a narrow plurality in the number of district mayoralties won, and the People's Alliance scored small but notable victories against the CHP in Hatay and Kırklareli. The leader of the opposition Good Party (İYİ), Meral Akşener, announced her pending resignation after her party almost halved its share of the popular vote.

== Background ==
=== 2019 elections ===
During the local elections of 2019, the opposition parties had formed alliances in key races, and had narrowly defeated the government in two of the biggest cities in Turkey, namely Istanbul and Ankara. The election in Istanbul was won by a margin smaller than 0.2%, which the government successfully petitioned for a re-run. Τhis culminated in the mayοral electiοn οf June 2019, which the οppοsitiοn wοn in a landslide.

=== 2023 elections ===
The elections took place nine months after the 2023 parliamentary and presidential elections, where most parties opposed to President Recep Tayyip Erdoğan rallied behind the leader of the Republican People's Party, Kemal Kılıçdaroğlu, including the center-right Good Party (İYİ) and the pro-Kurdish Green Left Party (YSP) (now renamed to Peoples' Equality and Democracy Party (DEM)). Erdoğan, despite the predictions of most surveys, was narrowly reelected. This was despite an ongoing economic crisis and rapidly rising inflation. Following the defeat, the opposition six-party coalition was dissolved by İYİ Party.

=== Election of Özgür Özel as the leader of CHP ===
Following the 2023 elections, Kemal Kılıçdaroğlu remained as the leader of CHP despite calls for him to resign. This culminated in the contested 2023 party congress, where the deputy leader of the parliamentary group of the CHP, Özgür Özel, was elected as the new leader of the CHP. The call for change was led by the mayor of Istanbul, Ekrem İmamoğlu, who heavily criticized the way in which the CHP's election campaign was run.

== Candidates and alliances ==
=== People's Alliance ===
The governing AKP and their main partner MHP entered the election in a partnership, where they endorsed each others' candidates in key districts.

AKP nominated Murat Kurum, Member of Parliament for Istanbul (I) electoral district and former Minister of Environment, Urbanisation and Climate Change, for the mayoral election in Istanbul, which was endorsed by MHP. In Ankara, the alliance nominated the mayor of the district of Keçiören, Turgut Altınok.

=== CHP ===
CHP's campaign logo for the local elections

The main opposition CHP, which had won Ankara and Istanbul in 2019 nominated the same mayors for a second term. Thus, Ekrem İmamoğlu was nominated for the municipality of Istanbul, and Mansur Yavaş was nominated in Ankara.

=== İYİ Party ===
After the 2023 elections, İYİ leader Meral Akşener, along with the party's executive committee, refused to cooperate with CHP like they did in 2019. This was despite the CHP repeatedly offering an alliance with them.

== Political parties participating in the election ==
General information about the parties that meet the conditions to participate in the election as of 2 January 2024 is listed here. The Innovation Party announced that it would not participate in the election. The places of 35 political parties on the ballot paper were announced by the YSK on 27 January 2024.

Because of long-running court cases the Green Party and the Humanity and Freedom Party were not included in the ballot.

Positions of parties on the ballot papers
Position	Party		Founded	Leader	Alliance
1	AK Party	Justice and Development Party	2001	Recep Tayyip Erdoğan	People's Alliance
2	İYİ Parti	Good Party	2017	Meral Akşener	—
3	SOL	Left Party	2019	Önder İşleyen	—
4	BBP	Great Unity Party	1993	Mustafa Destici	People's Alliance
5	Memleket	Homeland Party	2021	Muharrem İnce	—
6	ANAP	Motherland Party	2011	İbrahim Çelebi	—
7	DSP	Democratic Left Party	1985	Önder Aksakal	—
8	Yeniden Refah	New Welfare Party	2018	Fatih Erbakan	—
9	DEM Party	People's Equality and Democracy Party	2012	Tülay Hatimoğulları Oruç; Tuncer Bakırhan	—
10	TKP	Communist Party of Turkey	2001	Kemal Okuyan (Note: In accordance with the collective leadership principle, the most authoritative decision-making body is the Central Committee elected at the party congress.)	—
11	ABP	Anatolia Union Party	2020	Bedri Yalçın	—
12	ZP	Victory Party	2021	Ümit Özdağ	—
13	HKP	People's Liberation Party	2005	Nurullah Ankut	—
14	TKH	Communist Movement of Turkey	2015	Aysel Tekerek	—
15	BTP	Independent Turkey Party	2001	Hüseyin Baş	—
16	Gelecek Partisi	Future Party	2019	Ahmet Davutoğlu	Felicity and Future Alliance
17	YTP	New Turkey Party	2013	Engin Yılmaz	—
18	CHP	Republican People's Party	1923	Özgür Özel	—
19	EMEP	Labour Party	1996	Selma Gürkan	
20	HÜDA PAR	Free Cause Party	2012	Zekeriya Yapıcıoğlu	—
21	HAK-PAR	Rights and Freedoms Party	2002	Düzgün Kaplan	—
22	Ocak	Hearth Party	2023	Kadir Canpolat	—
23	AB PARTİ	Justice Union Party	2018	İrfan Uzun	—
24	DP	Democrat Party	2007	Gültekin Uysal	—
25	GBP	Power Union Party	2020	Ali Karnap	—
26	MİLLET	Nation Party	1992	Cuma Nacar	—
27	Milli Yol	National Path Party	2021	Remzi Çayır	—
28	AP	Justice Party	2015	Vecdet Öz	—
29	GP	Young Party	2002	Hakan Uzan	—
30	ADP	Enlightened Democracy Party	2021	Zeynep Yıkarbaba	—
31	MHP	Nationalist Movement Party	1969	Devlet Bahçeli	People's Alliance
32	TİP	Workers' Party of Turkey	2017	Erkan Baş	—
33	DEVA	Democracy and Progress Party	2020	Ali Babacan	—
34	SAADET	Felicity Party	2001	Temel Karamollaoğlu	Felicity and Future Alliance
35	VP	Patriotic Party	2015	Doğu Perinçek	—

== Security concerns and incidents ==
Around 594,000 security personnel were deployed nationwide to ensure the regular conduct of the election.

On 10 February, gunmen opened fire at a campaign event in the Küçükçekmece district municipality of Istanbul for AKP mayoral candidate Aziz Yeniay, critically injuring one person. Seventeen people were arrested in connection with the attack.

On 10 March, 33 people suspected of involvement with Islamic State were arrested in police raids in Sakarya Province on suspicion of plotting attacks ahead of the election. Authorities also recovered weapons, cash and "organizational documents".

On election day, one person was killed and 11 others were injured following a dispute over the election of a neighborhood administrator in Diyarbakır, while six people were injured in clashes in Şanlıurfa Province.

== Results ==
Party	Votes	%
Republican People's Party	17,391,548	37.77
Justice and Development Party	16,339,771	35.49
New Welfare Party	2,851,784	6.19
Peoples' Equality and Democracy Party	2,625,588	5.70
Nationalist Movement Party	2,297,662	4.99
Good Party	1,735,924	3.77
Victory Party	800,905	1.74
Felicity Party	503,210	1.09
Free Cause Party	253,648	0.55
Great Unity Party	200,301	0.44
Democracy and Progress Party	150,600	0.33
Independent Turkey Party	113,043	0.25
Democrat Party	92,166	0.20
Homeland Party	78,289	0.17
Workers' Party of Turkey	71,108	0.15
Communist Party of Turkey	51,303	0.11
Democratic Left Party	48,516	0.11
Patriotic Party	43,240	0.09
New Turkey Party	42,646	0.09
Nation Party	38,578	0.08
Future Party	34,212	0.07
Rights and Freedoms Party	31,633	0.07
Labour Party	29,985	0.07
Left Party	22,810	0.05
Motherland Party	17,739	0.04
Communist Movement of Turkey	17,406	0.04
Justice Union Party	15,790	0.03
National Path Party	15,705	0.03
People's Liberation Party	8,654	0.02
Anatolia Union Party	6,139	0.01
True Path Party	3,921	0.01
Hearth Party	2,401	0.01
Enlightened Democracy Party	287	0.00
Independents	108,144	0.23
**Total**	**46,044,656**	**100.00**
Valid votes	46,044,656	95.42
Invalid/blank votes	2,210,042	4.58
Total votes	**48,254,698**	**100.00**
Registered voters/turnout	61,430,934	78.55
Source: Sözcü, Hürriyet, Anadolu Agency

=== Changes in control ===
The list below shows the parties governing the capitals of the 81 provinces before and after the local elections. Provinces in bold denote metropolitan municipalities.

Summary
Party:
Before:
Elected:
Change:

Party totals
AK Party	CHP	MHP	DEM Party	YRP	Others
39	22	11	(Note: as HDP)8	0	1
24	35	8	10	2	2
-15	+13	-3	+2	+2	+1

=== Key races ===
Istanbul Metropolitan Mayor
Ekrem İmamoğlu	51.14%
Murat Kurum	39.59%
Others	9.27%
Winner: Ekrem İmamoğlu, CHP; Margin: 11.55%, ▲2.34 pp **CHP** HOLD

Ankara Metropolitan Mayor
Mansur Yavaş	60.38%
Turgut Altınok	31.69%
Others	7.93%
Winner: Mansur Yavaş, CHP; Margin: 28.69%, ▲24.88 pp **CHP** HOLD

İzmir Metropolitan Mayor
Cemil Tugay	48.96%
Hamza Dağ	37.06%
Others	13.98%
Winner: Cemil Tugay, CHP; Margin: 11.90%, ▼7.50 pp **CHP** HOLD

Bursa Metropolitan Mayor
Mustafa Bozbey	47.62%
Alinur Aktaş	38.35%
Others	14.03%
Winner: Mustafa Bozbey, CHP; Margin: 9.27%, ▲11.86 pp **CHP** GAIN from **AK PARTY**

Antalya Metropolitan Mayor
Muhittin Böcek	48.64%
Hakan Tütüncü	40.03%
Others	11.33%
Winner: Muhittin Böcek, CHP; Margin: 8.61%, ▲4.26 pp **CHP** HOLD

==== Full list ====
Note: AK Party is abbreviated "AKP" and Yeniden Refah is abbreviated "YRP" here for visualisation purposes. Metropolitan municipalities are in bold.

Province	Before	Elected
**Adana**	CHP	CHP
Adıyaman	AKP	CHP
Afyon	AKP	CHP
Ağrı	AKP	DEM
Amasya	MHP	CHP
**Ankara**	CHP	CHP
**Antalya**	CHP	CHP
Artvin	CHP	CHP
**Aydın**	CHP	CHP
**Balıkesir**	AKP	CHP
Bilecik	CHP	CHP
Bingöl	AKP	AKP
Bitlis	AKP	AKP
Bolu	CHP	CHP
Burdur	CHP	CHP
**Bursa**	AKP	CHP
Çanakkale	CHP	CHP

Province	Before	Elected
Çankırı	MHP	MHP
Çorum	AKP	AKP
**Denizli**	AKP	CHP
**Diyarbakır**	HDP	DEM
Edirne	CHP	CHP
Elazığ	AKP	AKP
Erzincan	MHP	MHP
**Erzurum**	AKP	AKP
**Eskişehir**	CHP	CHP
**Gaziantep**	AKP	AKP
Giresun	AKP	CHP
Gümüşhane	AKP	MHP
Hakkâri	HDP	DEM
**Hatay**	CHP	AKP
Isparta	AKP	AKP
**Mersin**	CHP	CHP
**Istanbul**	CHP	CHP

Province	Before	Elected
**İzmir**	CHP	CHP
Kars	HDP	MHP
Kastamonu	MHP	CHP
**Kayseri**	AKP	AKP
Kırklareli	CHP	MHP
Kırşehir	CHP	CHP
**Kocaeli**	AKP	AKP
**Konya**	AKP	AKP
Kütahya	MHP	CHP
**Malatya**	AKP	AKP
**Manisa**	MHP	CHP
**K. Maraş**	AKP	AKP
**Mardin**	HDP	DEM
**Muğla**	CHP	CHP
Muş	AKP	DEM
Nevşehir	AKP	İYİ
Niğde	AKP	AKP

Province	Before	Elected
**Ordu**	AKP	AKP
Rize	AKP	AKP
**Sakarya**	AKP	AKP
**Samsun**	AKP	AKP
Siirt	HDP	DEM
Sinop	CHP	CHP
Sivas	AKP	BBP
**Tekirdağ**	CHP	CHP
Tokat	AKP	MHP
**Trabzon**	AKP	AKP
Tunceli	TKP	DEM
**Şanlıurfa**	AKP	YRP
Uşak	AKP	CHP
**Van**	HDP	DEM
Yozgat	AKP	YRP
Zonguldak	AKP	CHP
Aksaray	AKP	AKP

Province	Before	Elected
Bayburt	MHP	AKP
Karaman	MHP	MHP
Kırıkkale	AKP	CHP
Batman	HDP	DEM
Şırnak	AKP	AKP
Bartın	MHP	CHP
Ardahan	CHP	CHP
Iğdır	HDP	DEM
Yalova	CHP	CHP
Karabük	MHP	AKP
Kilis	AKP	CHP
Osmaniye	MHP	MHP
Düzce	AKP	AKP

== Reactions ==
President Erdoğan acknowledged the AKP's electoral losses but said that it would mark "not an end for us but rather a turning point", adding that he would respect the result, "correct our mistakes and redress our shortcomings". The CHP’s Özgür Özel praised voters, saying that they had established a "new political order" in Turkey leading to "a new political climate". İYİ leader Meral Akşener called for an extraordinary party congress amid demands for her resignation.

== Analysis ==
This was the first election since the governing Justice and Development Party (AKP)'s establishment in 2001 that it did not come first in a national election, with the CHP winning 37.8% of the vote compared to the AKP's 35.5%. It was the first nationwide election since 1977 in which the CHP came first. CHP affiliated mayors now govern cities which make up 64% of Turkey's population and 80% of its economy. Commentators compared the vote to the 1989 local election, where the centre-left opposition at the time had scored significant victories against long-standing right-wing governments and came first in the popular vote. Nevertheless, the People's Alliance did score some victories against the opposition, taking the traditionally opposition-leaning mayoralties of Hatay and Kırklareli, and narrowly won a plurality of district municipalities.

The smaller centre-right opposition İYİ Party performed poorly across the country, coming sixth in terms of popular vote and losing over half its vote share. Its leader, Meral Akşener, called an extraordinary party congress but did not announce whether she would run again for the leadership. Meanwhile, the Islamist conservative New Welfare Party (YRP) came third with over 6% of the vote, winning many municipalities in conservative areas from the AKP. The pro-Kurdish DEM Party marginally improved their share of the vote, despite some calls for boycotts in their traditional strongholds due to the likelihood of mayors being forcibly removed from office by the Interior Ministry on charges of supporting separatist terrorism. The Nationalist Movement Party (MHP), the AKP's junior alliance partner, lost votes but retained control of many key municipalities that it had won in the previous election.

Described as an "electoral disaster" for President Erdoğan, commentators speculated that any intention by the government to amend the constitution to extend his presidential term would likely be put on hold. Given the scale of their victories, both İmamoğlu and Yavaş are widely seen as possible opposition candidates for the next Turkish presidential election, which the government refused to bring forward in light of the results despite speculation over early elections.

== Canceled annulment ==
On 2 April, authorities annulled the victory of DEM’s Abdullah Zeydan, who won more than 55% of the vote in the mayoral election in Van and declared his rival, Abdulahat Arvas from the AKP, the winner despite garnering only 27% of the vote. The decision led to anti-government protests in Van and Istanbul, as well as a rally in Ankara. The CHP sent members to Van in support. Tuncer Bakırhan of the DEM called the reversal a "political coup" while the party referred to it as "unlawful and illegitimate". The following day, the Supreme Election Board heard Zeydan's appeal and reinstated him as the winner.
