= Ottoman Hearths =

Turkish political group

Ottoman Hearths (Osmanlı Ocakları)
- Flag used by the Ottoman Hearths
- Founder: Kadir Canpolat
- Ideology: Turkish-Islamic nationalism; Pan-Turkism; Neo-Ottomanism; Conservatism; Islamokemalism
- Part of: Hearth Party

The Ottoman Hearths (Turkish: Osmanlı Ocakları) is a Turkish nationalist and Islamist sociopolitical group.

== History ==
The Ottoman Hearths are Turkish nationalist, Islamist, Pan-Turkist, and Neo-Ottomanist, to an extent that the Neo-Ottomanism only refers to the preservation and continuation of Ottoman traditions and history, and not harming the Republic of Turkey. The Ottoman Hearths are hardline supporters of Recep Tayyip Erdoğan. The Ottoman Hearths also view Mustafa Kemal Atatürk as the saviour of the Turkish nation, rather than as the abolisher of the Ottoman Empire, and they often criticise the CHP and accuse them of drifting away from Atatürk's path. Kadir Canpolat, the founder of the Ottoman Hearths, stated that "as the Ottoman Hearths, we have never failed at respecting our ancestors and those who founded our Republic. Because the Republic is ours just as much as the Ottoman Empire is ours." Canpolat, when talking about the criticism of Mustafa Kemal Atatürk, stated "we will never allow this. Atatürk is also our Atatürk. Ottoman civilization is our essence. We will follow our ancestors, but with the values of the Republic. Atatürk is ours, Abdulhamid is ours, and Recep Tayyip Erdoğan is ours. We will protect our national and spiritual values in all forms."

The political wing of the Ottoman Hearths is the Hearth Party. Ottoman Hearths also use the hand symbol made by the Hearth Party, which is identical to the "Che vuoi" gesture and represents bridging the differences between Ottoman and Kemalist eras thru Turkish unity.

The Ottoman Hearths are nationalistic, and praise various Turkic historical leaders and empires, and often carry flags of the 16 Great Turkic Empires, and use terms like "Turkish power".

In 2017, the National Coordinator for Security and Counterterrorism (NCTV) described the Ottoman Hearths as a “pro-government paramilitary organization” and said that the opening of an Ottoman Hearths office in the Netherlands was a “worrying development”. The NCTV accused the Ottoman Hearths of planning to attack political opponents of Recep Tayyip Erdoğan in the Netherlands. The Ottoman Hearths deny any connection to Erdoğan aside from political support.
