= New Welfare Party =

Ultraconservative political party in Turkey

New Welfare Party Yeniden Refah Partisi
- Abbreviation: Yeniden Refah (official); YRP (unofficial)
- Leader: Fatih Erbakan
- General Secretary: Bülent O. Osmanağaoğlu
- Spokesperson: Suat Kılıç
- Founder: Fatih Erbakan
- Founded: 23 November 2018; 7 years ago
- Split from: Felicity Party
- Headquarters: Balgat Mah. 1421. Cad. No : 15 Çankaya/Ankara
- Membership (2026): ▲703,085
- Ideology: Millî Görüş; Islamism; Neo-Ottomanism; Pan-Islamism; Hard Euroscepticism; Ultraconservatism
- Political position: Right-wing to far-right
- National affiliation: People's Alliance (2023–2024)
- Colors: Red (official); Charcoal-gray (customary)
- Slogan: Milletimiz için biz varız ("We are here for our nation")
- Grand National Assembly: 4 / 600
- Provinces: 1 / 51
- District municipalities: 17 / 922
- Belde Municipalities: 6 / 390
- Provincial councilors: 21 / 1,282
- Municipal Assemblies: 1,004 / 20,953

Website
- https://yenidenrefahpartisi.org.tr/

The New Welfare Party (Turkish: Yeniden Refah Partisi, YRP) is an Islamist and ultraconservative political party in Turkey, founded on 23 November 2018. The party positions itself as the successor to the Welfare Party (Turkish: Refah Partisi), which was a prominent Islamist political party in the 1990s. The party's founder and leader Fatih Erbakan is the son of the late Turkish prime minister Necmettin Erbakan who was the founder of the original Welfare Party and the inspiration for the Millî Görüş ideology.

== History ==
YRP was established by Fatih Erbakan, who aimed to revive the legacy of the original Welfare Party, which had been a significant political force in Turkey before its closure by the Constitutional Court in 1998 for activities against the principle of secularism. The founding of the New Welfare Party reflects an effort to re-enter the political scene with a reformed agenda that complies with the secular and democratic framework of the Turkish Republic while retaining a focus on Islamic values.

On 21 January 2023, leader of the far-right Danish political party Stram Kurs, Rasmus Paludan was permitted to burn a Quran outside the Turkish embassy in Stockholm. Following the incident, the party protested Sweden in front of the Swedish Consulate-General in Istanbul.

Initially a critic of the Justice and Development Party (AKP), in 2023 the party announced Fatih Erbakan's candidacy for the presidential election. However, the party later backpedaled and instead announced their support for Recep Tayyip Erdoğan, joining the People's Alliance on March 24, 2023. The party ran under their own list at the parliamentary elections, securing five seats at the Grand National Assembly.

Prior to the 2023 elections, Erbakan was supportive of Turkish government's efforts to improve relations with Egypt and the UAE. Shortly after the elections, Erbakan changed his position again, leaving the People's Alliance due, accusing the AKP of ignoring its demands including lowering interest rates, outlawing adultery and removing rules on gender equality. Erbakan has repeatedly criticized Erdogan's government over its pragmatism in regards to not embargoing Israel completely, and criticizes government's efforts to increase relations with Arab regimes like Egypt and the UAE.

The party achieved significant electoral success in the 2024 local elections, coming in third place and winning 6.2 percent of the vote, behind the Republican People's Party (CHP) and AKP.

== Ideology and political positions ==
The party's ideology is rooted in ultraconservatism and Islamism. The party was founded with the slogan "We are here for our nation". They specified that their main goals are "First morality and spirituality, then to design the new world order under the leadership of Turkey."

Fatih Erbakan has stated that the new party would replace the current system by a new presidential system, and that returning to a parliamentary system would be harmful.

The party is strongly against Israel and advocates cutting trade ties with the country. It also supports closing the Kürecik Radar Station, operated by NATO.

The party is against LGBT rights, and has declared that LGBT people are "a perversion banned in every religion". The party aims to lift a law that protects women and children against domestic violence. Party leader Fatih Erbakan is also an open supporter of the anti-vax movement. He claimed COVID-19 vaccines could lead to people giving birth to "half-human, half-monkey" children.

== Election results ==
=== Parliamentary elections ===
Grand National Assembly of Turkey
Election date	Leader	Votes	%	Seats	Previous Position	Current Position
2023	Fatih Erbakan	1,515,034	2.84%	5 / 600	Providing confidence and supply	Opposition

=== Local elections ===
Election	Party leader	Mayoral election votes	Percentage of votes	Municipal councillor votes	Percentage of votes	Number of municipalities	Number of councillors	Map
2024	Fatih Erbakan	2,851,784	6.19%					

== See also ==
- Welfare Party
- Politics of Turkey
- List of Islamic political parties
