= June 2015 Turkish general election =

- 7 June 2015

All 550 seats in the Grand National Assembly 276 seats needed for a majority
- Opinion polls
- Turnout: 83.92% (▲0.76pp)
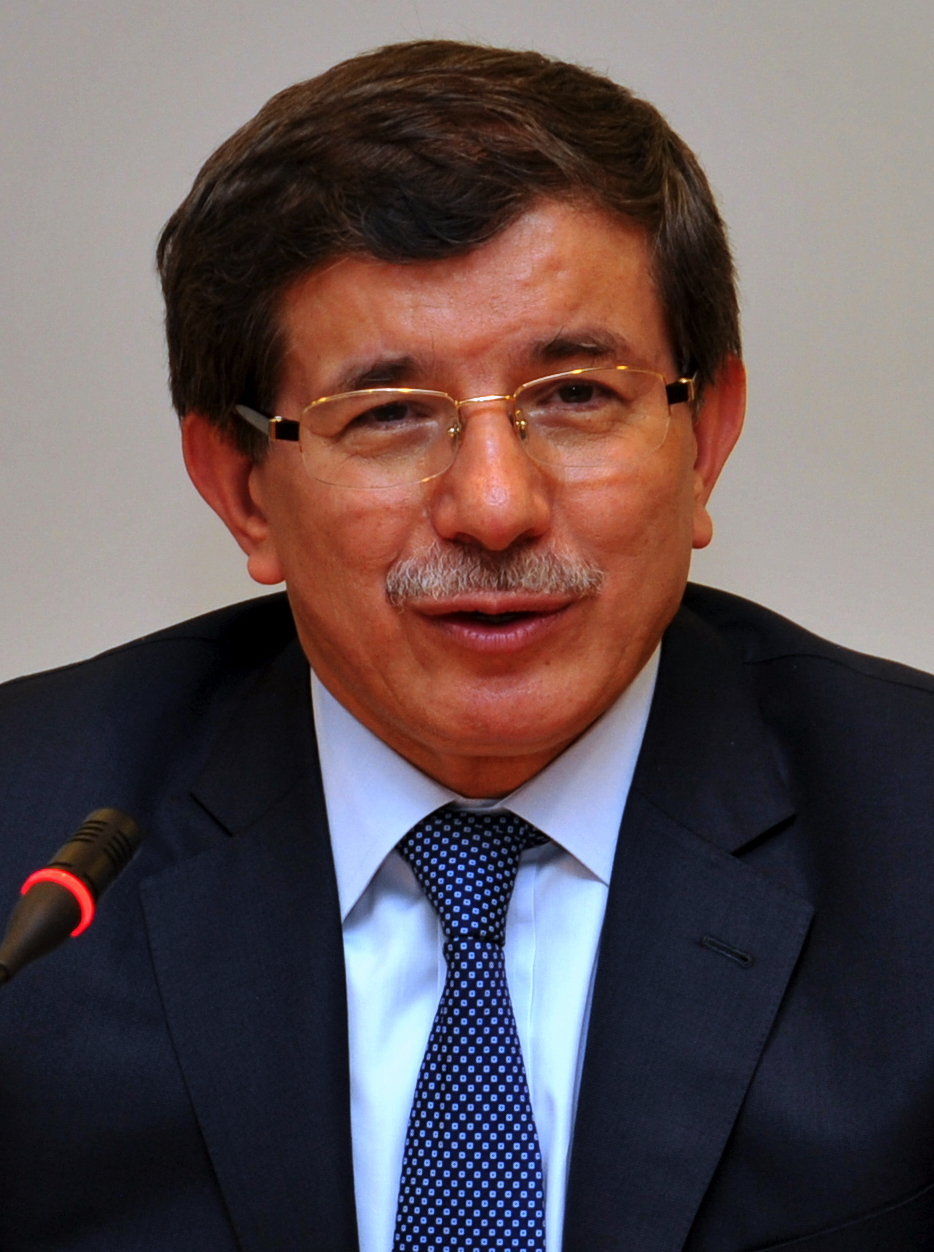

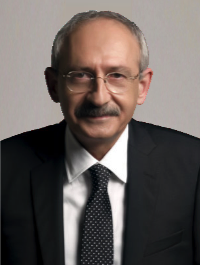

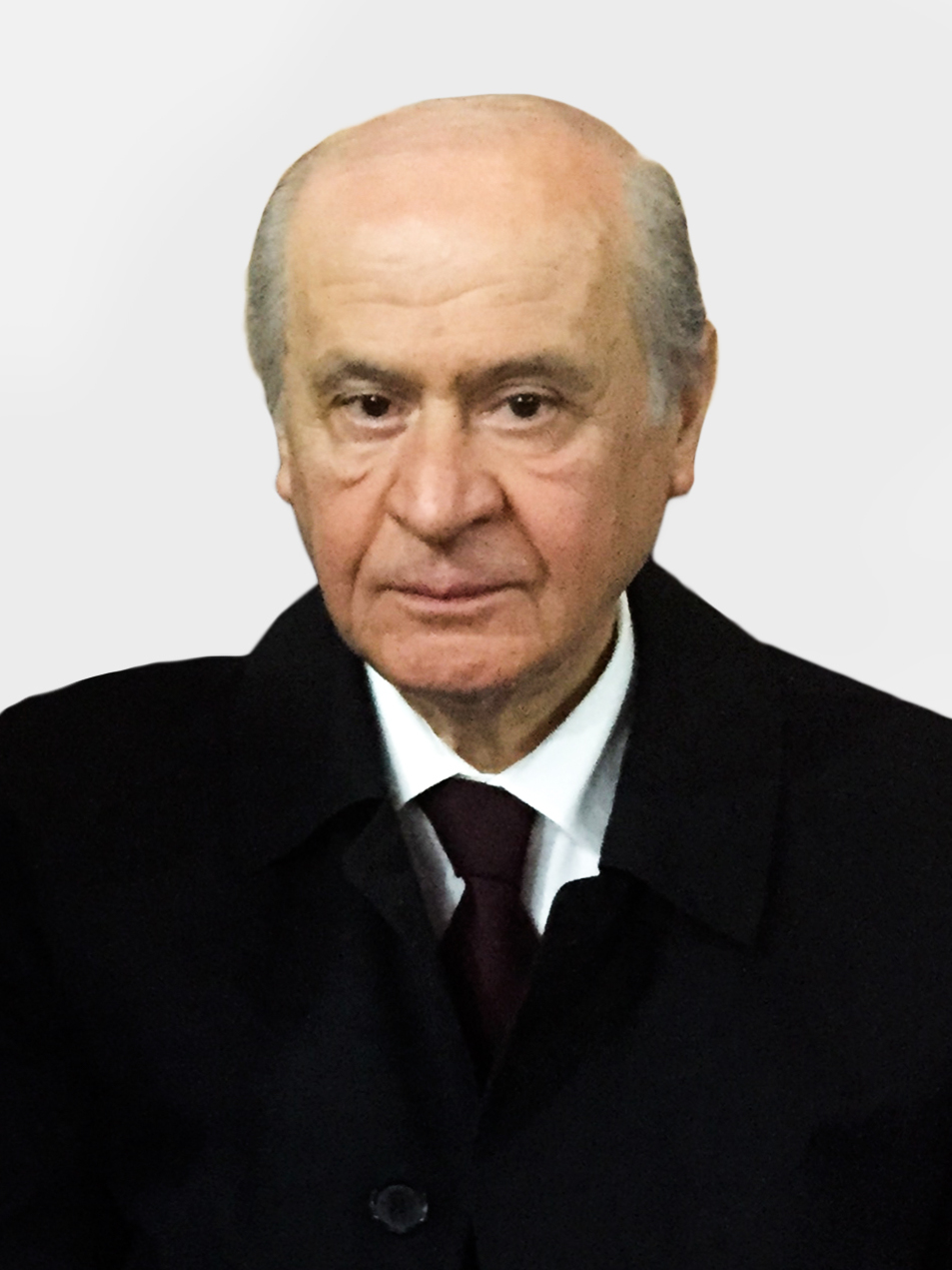

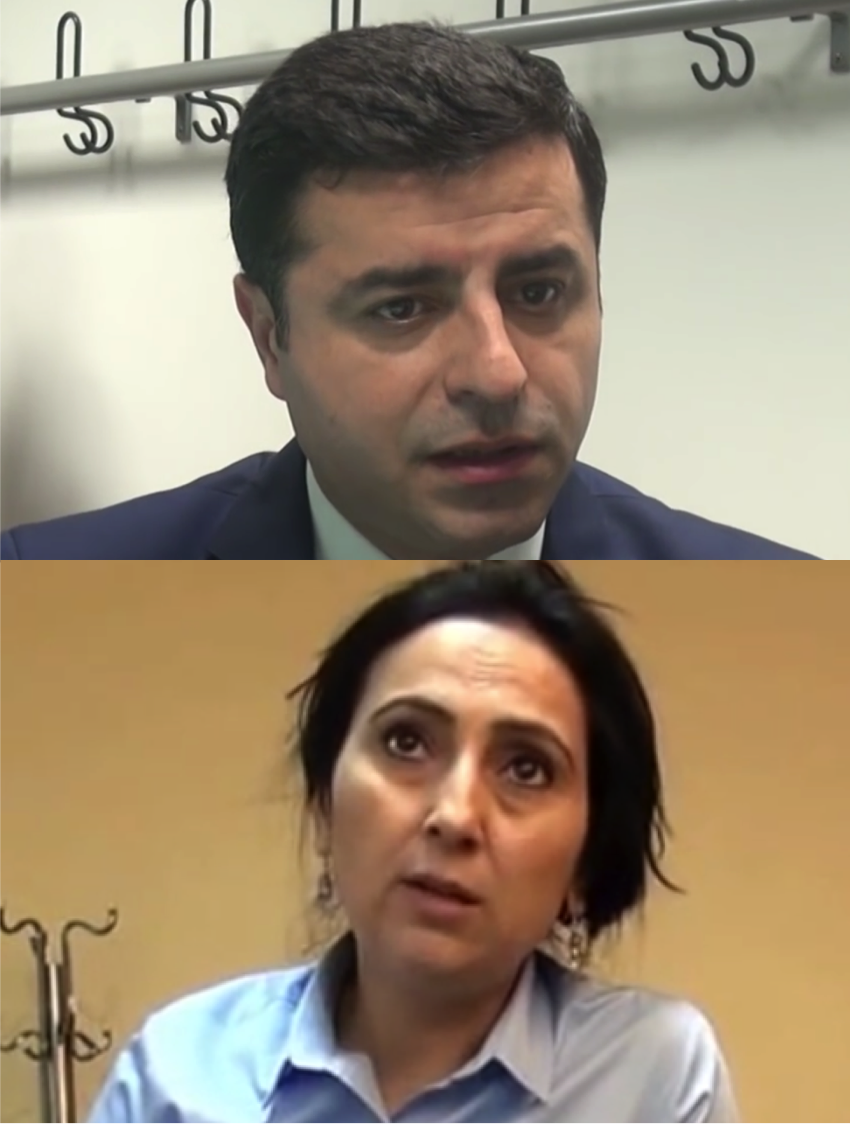
	First party	Second party
Leader	Ahmet Davutoğlu	Kemal Kılıçdaroğlu
Party	AK Party	CHP
Last election	49.83%, 327 seats	25.98%, 135 seats
Seats won	258	132
Seat change	▼69	▼3
Popular vote	18,867,411	11,518,139
Percentage	40.87%	24.95%
Swing	▼8.96pp	▼1.03pp
	Third party	Fourth party
Leader	Devlet Bahçeli	Selahattin Demirtaş; Figen Yüksekdağ
Party	MHP	HDP
Last election	13.01%, 53 seats	–
Seats won	80	80
Seat change	▲27	New
Popular vote	7,520,006	6,058,489
Percentage	16.29%	13.12%
Swing	▲3.28pp	New
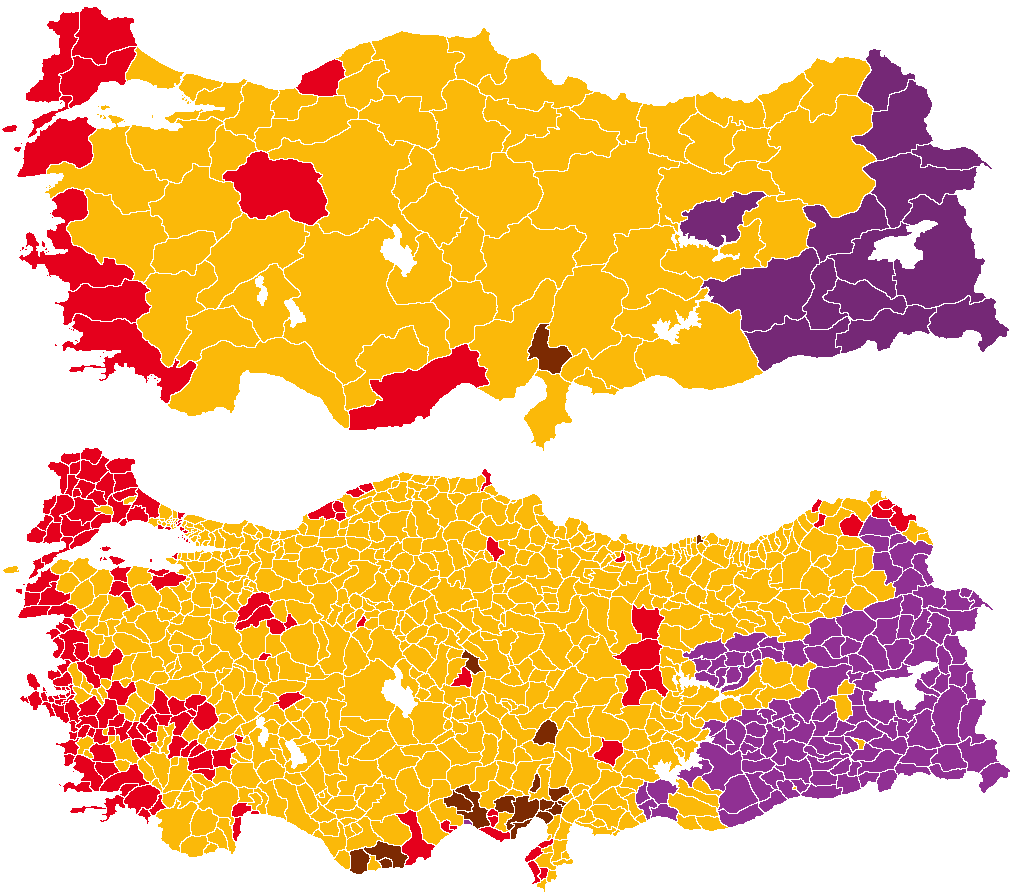
- Most voted-for party by province (top) and district (bottom); AKP (56) CHP (10) MHP (1) HDP (14)
Prime Minister before election
Ahmet Davutoğlu
AK Party
Elected Prime Minister
Ahmet Davutoğlu (interim)
AK Party

General elections were held in Turkey on 7 June 2015 to elect 550 members to the Grand National Assembly. This was the 24th general election in the history of the Turkish Republic, electing the country's 25th Parliament. The result was the first hung parliament since the 1999 general elections. Unsuccessful attempts to form a coalition government resulted in a snap general election being called for November 2015.

The Justice and Development Party (AKP), which had governed Turkey since 2002, lost its parliamentary majority and won 258 seats with 40.9% of the vote, clearly missing the aimed two-thirds majority for the implementation of President Recep Tayyip Erdoğan's call for an executive presidency. The main opposition Republican People's Party (CHP) also fared worse than their 2011 result, and won 132 seats with 25.0% of the vote. The Nationalist Movement Party (MHP) had been projected to win over many disaffected voters from the AKP. Its share of the vote increased, and the party won 80 seats with 16.3% of the vote. The new Peoples' Democratic Party (HDP) decided to contest the election as a party rather than fielding candidates as independents, despite concerns that it could have fallen below the 10% election threshold and lose all representation in Parliament. The party fared better than expectations, which was a key factor for denying the AKP another absolute majority: it won 13.1% of the vote and took 80 seats, the same as the MHP. The potential for a hung parliament had been widely considered and predicted before the election so the country and politicians were better prepared for the constitutional process that would follow such a result.

Campaigning before the election focused mainly on a faltering economy, the political conflict between the government and the Gülen Movement, and Turkey's involvement in the Syrian Civil War. Growing allegations of government corruption and authoritarianism, mainly originating from the 2013 corruption scandal and the 2013 Gezi Park protests respectively, were also part of the issues raised during the election campaign.

Electoral fraud claims and political violence caused controversy in the run-up to the election. Several candidates and party offices were subject to politically motivated attacks, culminating in the death of four HDP supporters after two bombs exploded during a rally in Diyarbakır on 5 June. The interference of President Erdoğan, who was accused of covertly campaigning for the AKP under the guise of 'public opening' rallies, was also controversial since the president of Turkey was constitutionally required to exercise political neutrality. Despite fraud claims dating back to the hugely controversial 2014 local elections and numerous claims of misconduct on polling day, the election was largely praised by the Organization for Security and Co-operation in Europe for being well-organised and was declared free and fair by the European Parliament.

== Background ==
The governing Justice and Development Party (AKP) sought a fourth consecutive term in government. Its leader, Ahmet Davutoğlu, who had taken over from Recep Tayyip Erdoğan in August 2014, sought a full term as Prime Minister of Turkey in his own right. The AKP's goal was to win more than 330 seats in order to have the right to put constitutional changes to a referendum, or more ideally 367 seats to bypass a referendum and change the constitution directly within parliament.

The Republican People's Party (CHP) aimed to surpass the 30% boundary and to form a government, potentially with the help of smaller parties or in its own right. The CHP's leader Kemal Kılıçdaroğlu had publicly stated that his party would target 35% of the vote, a rise of 9% from its 2011 result, in order to be able to form the next government. Popular support for the Nationalist Movement Party (MHP) had surged during the 2014 local elections, and it aimed to participate in a coalition government. However, several politicians from the CHP and MHP resigned in protest against their unrealistic electoral prospects, and formed their own parties. The most prominent break-away party was the Anatolia Party formed by former CHP MP Emine Ülker Tarhan in November 2014. Other significant factors that opposition parties would also need to overcome were issues such as media bias and electoral fraud, both of which increased sharply in the preceding local and presidential elections.

=== Electoral cycle ===
This election is the last election - presidential, local and general - scheduled in Turkey until 2019. Arguments as to whether this is by chance, or whether it was planned by the Justice and Development Party (AKP) government when they proposed to reduce the parliamentary terms from five years to four in the 2007 constitutional referendum, are still ongoing. Speculation as to what the AKP government will do during four years of electorally unchecked power should they win generated both favourable predictions and concerns. While four years without elections may allow the government to undertake widespread necessary economic reforms, critics of the AKP argue that it is an opportunity to further erode the diminishing checks and balances and separation of powers in the Turkish political and legal systems. The AKP also support a presidential system, which would give greater powers to President Recep Tayyip Erdoğan.

=== Early elections ===
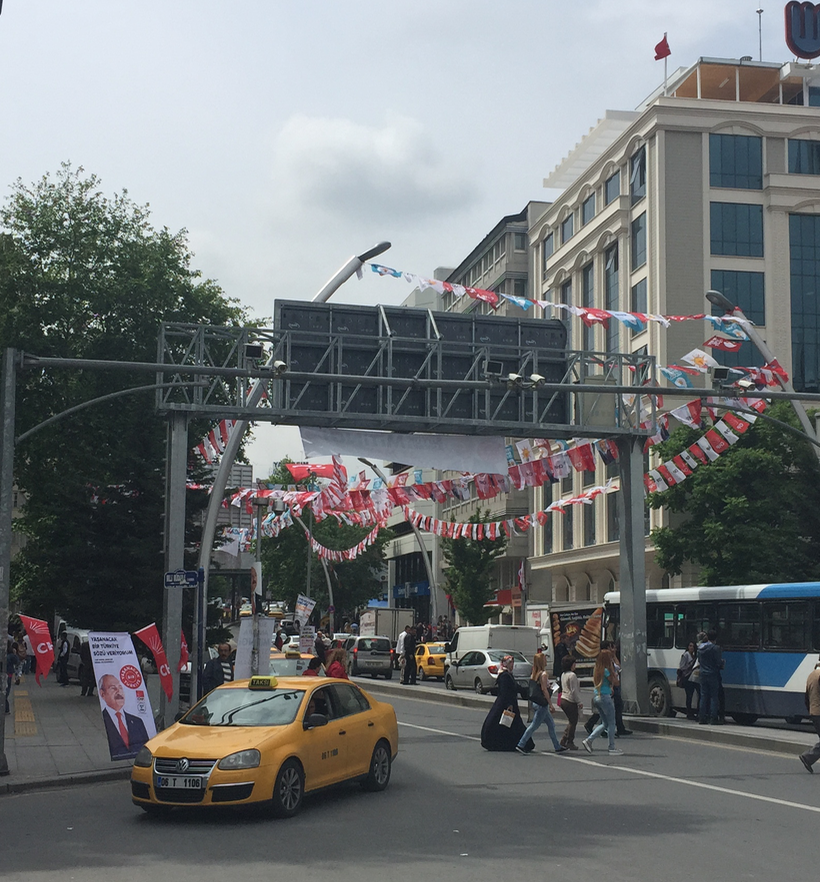
Political flags and advertisements near Güvenpark at Kızılay, Ankara, 5 June 2015

The AKP government had allegedly proposed to hold an early general election in November 2014 if their candidate Recep Tayyip Erdoğan won the 2014 presidential election, especially due to opinion polls predicting a comfortable victory for Erdoğan in the first round. This would allow the AKP's new leader to seek an electoral mandate in their own right rather than serving the remainder of Erdoğan's term before seeking re-election. Although Erdoğan did win outright with 51.79% of the vote, his popular vote share was significantly below what opinion polls predicted. The presidential election results, according to several political commentators and journalists, greatly reduced the possibility of holding an early election, although some reports claimed that the government were preparing for an early election in April 2015. In October 2014, the AKP parliamentary group leader Naci Bostancı ruled out any prospect of holding the election early and Prime Minister Ahmet Davutoğlu stated in November that they would be held in June as per normal. Despite this, speculation in December 2014 as to whether the election would be brought forward in order not to clash with summer examinations remained. In the end, no such initiative was taken and Supreme Electoral Council of Turkey (YSK) went on with the date 7 June. Some schools changed the times of examinations in order to not clash with polling day.

The AKP were widely expected to target at least 330 seats in parliament in order to pursue constitutional reforms. In the 2014 local elections, the AKP won 42.87% of the vote, which would have translated into 285–300 seats had it been a general election. The opposition Republican People's Party (CHP) would have won 130–145 seats, the Nationalist Movement Party (MHP) would have won 75–85 and Kurdish nationalist independent candidates would win between 30 and 45 seats. Even if the AKP had sought backing from independent Kurdish candidates as part of the ongoing solution process with Kurdish PKK rebels, it was still unlikely that they would have held a sufficient number of seats to put constitutional changes to a referendum. As a result, the prospect for an early general election on political grounds diminished.

=== Issues and developments ===
The main issues that formed the agenda during the run-up to the election included the Solution process with Kurdish separatist rebels, the political conflict with the Gülen Movement in the Turkish political and legal system, an economic slowdown as well as the growing political polarisation in Turkish politics. The murder of Özgecan Aslan and the 2014 Soma mine disaster also raised the issues of women's and workers' rights respectively, while calls for minority rights for Turkey's Kurdish and Alevi minorities were also made by the opposition. In the run-up to the election, President Recep Tayyip Erdoğan also held controversial rallies, during which he openly called for a presidential system of government. The prospect of a presidential system, as opposed to the current parliamentary system, also dominated the agenda before the election, as well as Erdoğan's influence in the political system despite being required to remain neutral by the Constitution. The 2015 general election was the first general election to be held after the anti-government Gezi Park protests in 2013 and also the first since the 2013 government corruption scandal in which many AKP politicians, including Erdoğan, had been incriminated. The AKP's foreign policy, the ongoing Syrian Civil War and the rise of the Islamic State of Iraq and the Levant were also key issues. In late 2014, ISIL's siege of the predominantly Kurdish city of Kobanî in Syria caused deadly riots in south-eastern Turkey, with many Kurdish citizens protesting the inaction of the Turkish government. This resulted in the government passing a controversial 'Domestic Security' bill that gave significant powers to the police forces, with many opposition politicians and the European Union accusing the AKP of placing Turkey under 'martial law' and turning the country into a police state. Turkey's declining human rights record, growing censorship and the authoritarianism of the AKP government also therefore dominated the agenda and the opposition parties' campaigns. Revelations confirming that National Intelligence Organisation (MİT) lorries that were sent to Syria in January 2014 were in fact carrying weapons also resulted in accusations of high treason and war crimes being made against the AKP government.

== Electoral system ==
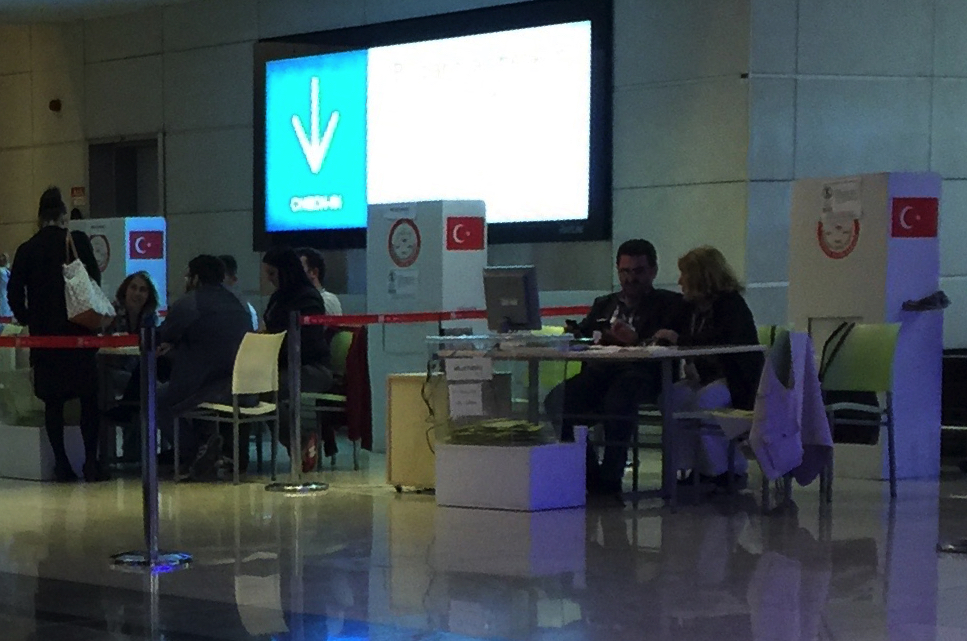
Citizens voting at customs in Sabiha Gökçen International Airport for the general election in Istanbul, 7 June 2015

Turkey was to elect 550 Members of Parliament to the Grand National Assembly using the D'Hondt method, a party-list proportional representation system. In order to return MPs to parliament, a party needed to gain more than 10% of the vote nationwide, meaning that parties may win the most votes in certain areas but not win any MPs due to a low result overall. The parliamentary threshold of 10% had been subject to intense scrutiny by opposition members, since all votes cast for parties polling under 10% are spoilt and allow the parties overcoming the national threshold to win seats much more easily, e.g. in the 2002 general election where the AKP won with 34.28% of the vote but won nearly two-thirds of the seats.

The parliamentary threshold does not apply to independents, which is why Kurdish nationalist politicians who poll strongly in the south-east but are not able to win 10% of the overall vote stood as independents rather than as party candidates. This was the case in the 2007 and 2011 general election, where the Kurdish Democratic Society Party and the Peace and Democracy Party fielded independent candidates respectively.

=== Electoral districts ===
Turkey was split into 85 electoral districts at the time, which elect a certain number of Members to the Grand National Assembly of Turkey. The Assembly had a total of 550 seats, which each electoral district allocated a certain number of MPs in proportion to their population. The Supreme Electoral Council of Turkey conducts population reviews of each district before the election and can increase or decrease a district's number of seats according to their electorate.

In all but three cases, electoral districts shared the same name and borders of the 81 Provinces of Turkey, with the exception of İzmir, Istanbul and Ankara. Provinces electing between 19 and 36 MPs were split into two electoral districts, while any province electing above 36 MPs were divided into three. As the country's three largest provinces, İzmir and Ankara were divided into two subdistricts while Istanbul was divided into three. The distribution of elected MPs per electoral district is shown below.

District	MPs
Adana	14
Adıyaman	5
Afyonkarahisar	5
Ağrı	4
Aksaray	3
Amasya	3
Ankara	32
Ankara (I)	18
Ankara (II)	14
Antalya	14
Ardahan	2
Artvin	2
Aydın	7

District	MPs
Balıkesir	8
Bartın	2
Batman	4
Bayburt	2
Bilecik	2
Bingöl	3
Bitlis	3
Bolu	3
Burdur	3
Bursa	18
Çanakkale	4
Çankırı	2
Çorum	4

District	MPs
Denizli	7
Diyarbakır	11
Düzce	3
Edirne	3
Elazığ	4
Erzincan	2
Erzurum	6
Eskişehir	6
Gaziantep	12
Giresun	4
Gümüşhane	2
Hakkâri	3
Hatay	10

District	MPs
Iğdır	2
Isparta	4
Istanbul	88
Istanbul (I)	31
Istanbul (II)	26
Istanbul (III)	31
İzmir	26
İzmir (I)	13
İzmir (II)	13
Kahramanmaraş	8
Kars	3
Kastamonu	3
Karabük	2

District	MPs
Karaman	2
Kayseri	9
Kilis	2
Kırklareli	3
Kırıkkale	3
Kırşehir	2
Kocaeli	11
Konya	14
Kütahya	4
Malatya	6
Manisa	9
Mardin	6
Mersin	11

District	MPs
Muğla	6
Muş	3
Nevşehir	3
Niğde	3
Ordu	5
Osmaniye	4
Rize	3
Sakarya	7
Samsun	9
Siirt	3
Sinop	2
Sivas	5
Şanlıurfa	12

District	MPs
Şırnak	4
Tekirdağ	6
Tokat	5
Trabzon	6
Tunceli	2
Uşak	3
Van	8
Yalova	2
Yozgat	4
Zonguldak	5
Total	550

==== Changes since 2011 ====
A total of eight electoral districts had their number of MPs adjusted since the 2011 general election by the electoral council, as listed below. The two electoral districts of Ankara also had their boundaries changed.

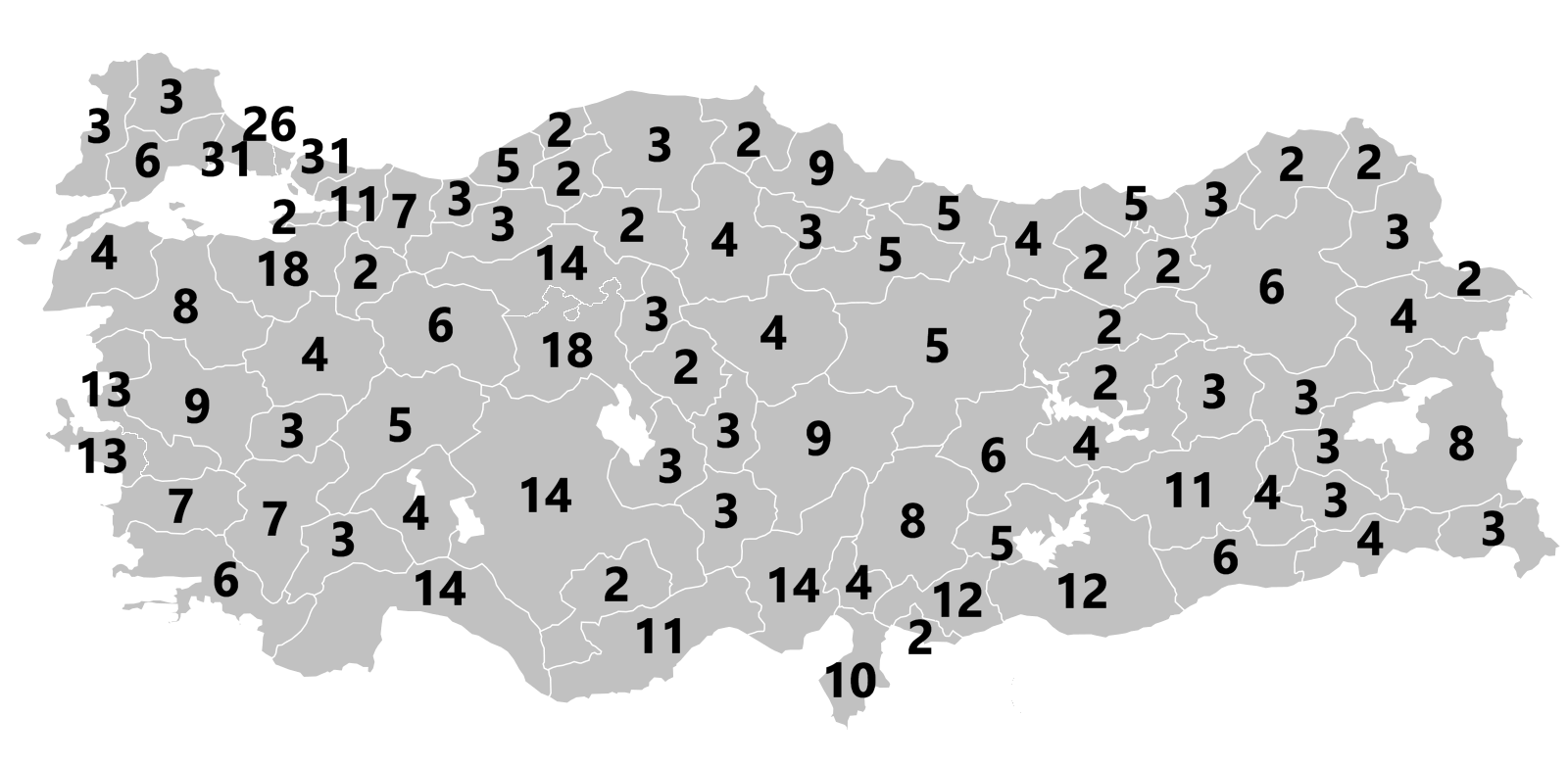
The number of MPs elected per electoral district for the 2015 general election

District	2011	2015	change
Ankara	31	32	▲1
Ankara (I)	16	18	▲2
Ankara (II)	15	14	▼1
Bayburt	1	2	▲1
Elazığ	5	4	▼1
Istanbul	85	88	▲3
Istanbul (I)	30	31	▲1

District	2011	2015	change
Istanbul (II)	27	26	▼1
Istanbul (III)	28	31	▲3
Kütahya	5	4	▼1
Manisa	10	9	▼1
Muş	4	3	▼1
Ordu	6	5	▼1

== Contesting parties ==
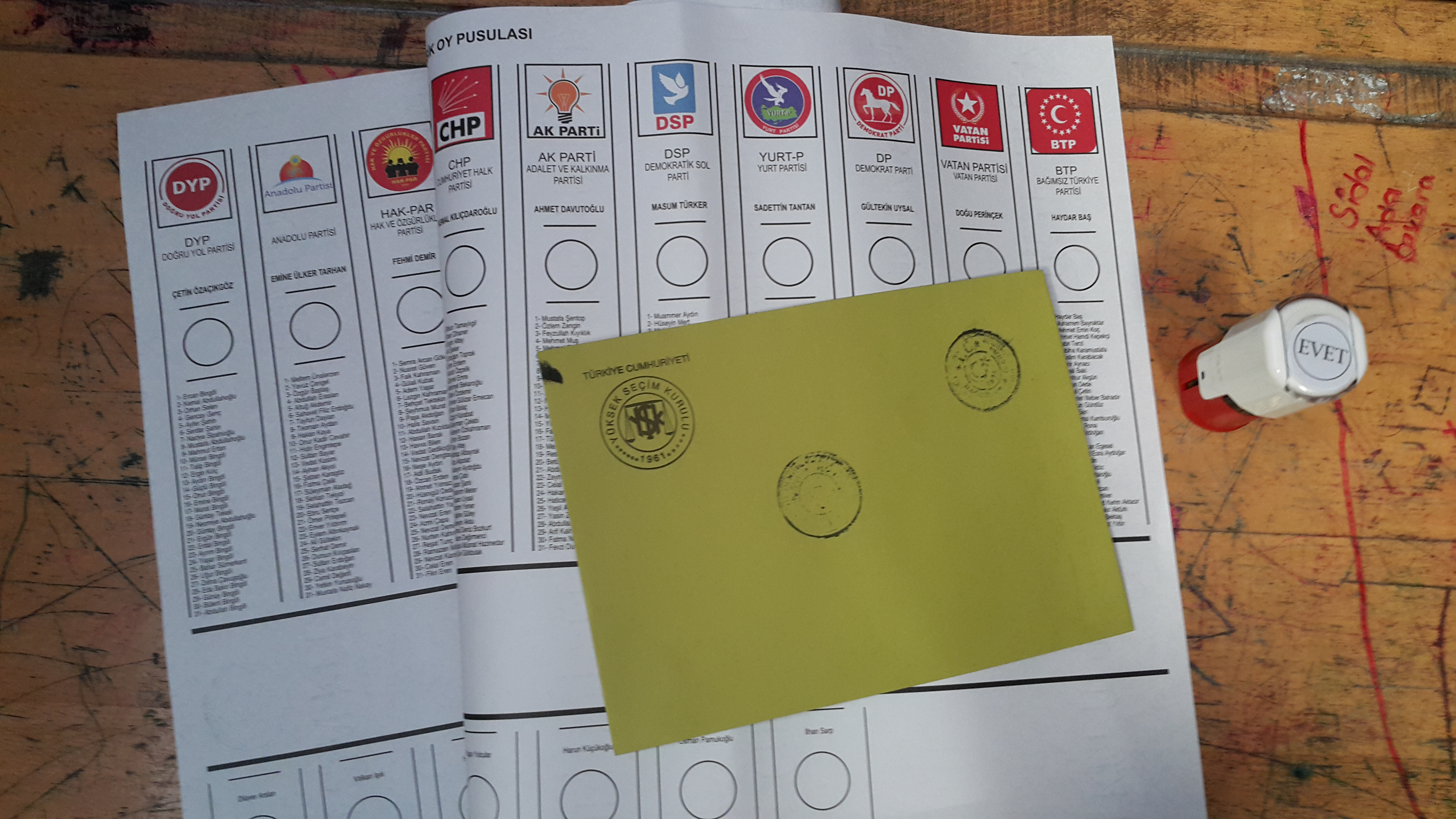
Ballot paper, envelope and stamp for Istanbul's 3rd electoral district

On 1 February, the Supreme Electoral Council of Turkey announced that 32 parties fit the criteria in order to field candidates in the general election. In order to be eligible, parties need to have formed local organisations at least six months before the election and have completed their party congresses by the election. Furthermore, they need local party offices in at least half of the 81 Provinces of Turkey. Of these 32 parties, 21 decided to submit candidate lists for election. The deadline to do so was 7 April 2015 by 17:00 local time. The delegation of one party, the First Party, suffered an accident on the way to deliver their candidate lists to the Supreme Electoral Council and was subsequently delayed by 22 minutes. The number of parties fielding candidates therefore fell to 20. The Free Cause Party (HÜDA-PAR) and the Rights and Equality Party (HEPAR) both announced that they would be fielding candidates as independents in order to bypass the 10% election threshold. The Communist Party (KP) contested all 550 seats by fielding female candidates only.

The parties contesting the election are listed below according to their position on the ballot paper.

Ballot #	Party		Leader	Position	Ideology	Districts contested
1	DYP	True Path Party	Çetin Özaçıkgöz	Centre-right	Liberal conservatism	56
2	ANAPAR	Anatolia Party	Emine Ülker Tarhan	Centre-left	Kemalism	85
3	HAK-PAR	Rights and Freedoms Party	Fehmi Fırat	Left-wing	Kurdish nationalism	75
4	KP	Communist Party	Özlem Şen Abay	Far-left	Communism	85
5	MP	Nation Party	Aykut Edibali	Centre-right	Turkish nationalism	85
6	HAP	Rights and Justice Party	Yiğit Zeki Öztürk	Centre	Social Justice	43
7	MEP	Centre Party	Abdurrahim Karslı	Centre	Centrism	73
8	TURK-P	Social Reconciliation Reform and Development Party	Ahmet Eyüp Özgüç	Centre	Centrism	55
9	HKP	People's Liberation Party	Nurullah Ankut	Far-left	Communism	85
10	LDP	Liberal Democrat Party	Cem Toker	Centre	Liberalism	58
11	MHP	Nationalist Movement Party	Devlet Bahçeli	Far-right	Turkish nationalism	85
12	HDP	Peoples' Democratic Party	Selahattin Demirtaş; Figen Yüksekdağ	Left-wing	Democratic socialism	85
13	SP	Felicity Party (National Alliance with the BBP)	Mustafa Kamalak	Far-right	Millî Görüş	85
14	CHP	Republican People's Party	Kemal Kılıçdaroğlu	Centre-left	Kemalism	85
15	AK Party	Justice and Development Party	Ahmet Davutoğlu	Centre-right	Conservative democracy	85
16	DSP	Democratic Left Party	Masum Türker	Centre-left	Ecevitism	85
17	YURT-P	Homeland Party	Sadettin Tantan	Centre-right	Turkish nationalism	56
18	DP	Democratic Party	Gültekin Uysal	Centre-right	Liberal conservatism	85
19	VP	Patriotic Party	Doğu Perinçek	Far-left	Left-wing nationalism	85
20	BTP	Independent Turkey Party	Haydar Baş	Centre	Kemalism	85

=== Party leadership elections ===
Numerous breakaway parties, such as the Anatolia Party, the Democratic Progress Party and the Nation and Justice Party were formed by former MPs of the CHP and AKP. In the end, only the Anatolia Party fielded candidates for election. The AKP, CHP and MHP all held leadership elections in the lead-up to the election, with Ahmet Davutoğlu elected unopposed as the AKP leader during the party's first extraordinary congress in August 2014. The MHP's long-time leader Devlet Bahçeli was re-elected unopposed during the 2015 MHP Extraordinary Congress, with his rivals unable to gain enough signatures to contest the leadership election. Kemal Kılıçdaroğlu was re-elected as CHP leader during the party's 2014 Extraordinary Convention, defeating his rival Muharrem İnce. The HDP has a co-presidential system, where one male and one female leader are elected. The party's chairman and chairwoman are Selahattin Demirtaş and Figen Yüksekdağ. Many opposition commentators and opinion polls show that the public largely regard President Recep Tayyip Erdoğan, the AKP's founder who constitutionally must remain neutral as president, as the de facto leader of the AKP. Of the 20 parties contesting the election, only two party leaders were women. These were Emine Ülker Tarhan of the Anatolia Party and Özlem Şen Abay of the Communist Party.

AKP 27 August 2014 Extraordinary Congress
Candidate	Votes	Percentage
Ahmet Davutoğlu	1,382	100.0
Invalid/blank votes	6	–
Total	1,388	100.0
Number of delegates/turnout	1,420	97.7
Source: Akşam

CHP 22 September 2014 Extraordinary Convention
Candidate	Votes	%
Kemal Kılıçdaroğlu	740	64.1
Muharrem İnce	415	35.9
Invalid/blank votes	26	–
Total	1,181	100.0
Number of delegates/turnout	1,218	94.8

MHP 21 March 2015 Ordinary Congress
Candidate	Votes	%
Devlet Bahçeli	1,149	100.0
Invalid/blank votes	11	–
Total	1,160	100.0
Number of delegates/turnout	1,242	93.4
Source: Sözcü

== Potential coalitions and pre-election alliances ==
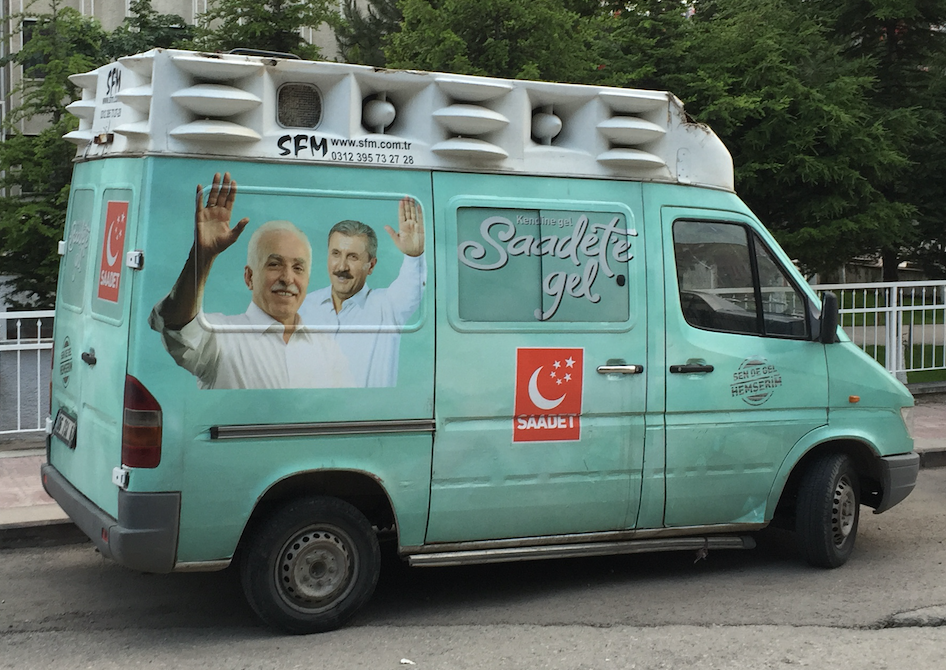
Election vans from parties used to campaign using election songs and slogans.

Polls showed that the AKP, CHP, MHP and potentially the HDP were the parties most likely to enter parliament during the election. A poll also showed the Anatolia Party polling close to the 10% parliamentary threshold at 8.04%, though more recent polls did not shown the party to command significant support. Any party winning below 10% of the vote does not gain any parliamentary representation and has their votes reallocated to the winning party's vote share, giving them a large winners bonus.

A coalition government had been widely considered as a potential outcome of this election and the first to be formed since 1999. Foreign embassies in Turkey have expressed their expectation for a coalition while speculation in the media has centred over the possible make-up of the incoming government. In April, the CHP announced that it could form a coalition with any party that supports judicial independence and the separation of powers and hinted at a possible CHP-MHP-HDP coalition, since all three parties are fiercely critical of the governing AKP. It was perceived to be unlikely that the MHP and HDP, which are right-wing Turkish nationalist and left-wing Kurdish nationalist parties respectively, would join a coalition together. This was confirmed when MHP leader Devlet Bahçeli recommended that those who suggested such a coalition to 'see a doctor'. However, the MHP formed a coalition with the centre-left Democratic Left Party in 1999 and fielded a joint presidential candidate with the centre-left CHP in 2014, making a potential coalition with the CHP a possibility. The HDP have also signalled a potential coalition with the CHP, though co-leader Selahattin Demirtaş staunchly rejected any electoral alliance between them. On 2 June, Demirtaş stated that they would never form a coalition with the AKP but would consider a coalition deal with the CHP.

Despite Demirtaş's staunch opposition to an AKP-HDP coalition, the AKP were widely expected to negotiate with the HDP in order to put a series of constitutional changes to a referendum. In order to do so, the government would need 330 votes in parliament, with the HDP and AKP's joint seats totalling 338. A confidence-and-supply agreement with the HDP in such situations where more than a majority vote in parliament is needed was considered as a possible option. The MHP have a history of helping out the AKP, most notably during the 2007 presidential election. An AKP-MHP coalition is therefore also a possibility.

The centre-left Democratic Left Party (DSP) said that it would consider joining a coalition with the CHP should it win representation in Parliament, though ruled out a pre-election alliance deal that the two parties had made in the 2007 general election. The Patriotic Party (VP) proposed a merger with the CHP on the condition that it stood up for the 6 principles of Mustafa Kemal Atatürk, though the CHP has said it would not take such proposals seriously. Two minor parties, namely the Revolutionary People's Party (DHP) and Socialist Workers' Party of Turkey (TSİP) backed the CHP. In the event that ANAPAR did enter parliament, a triple CHP-MHP-ANAPAR coalition would have been likely.

According to the newspaper Cumhuriyet, a senior CHP politician was quoted as saying that an AKP-CHP coalition with Abdullah Gül as AKP leader is a potential eventuality. Gül, who was President of Turkey from 2007 to 2014, was known for his mediating stance in contrast to Recep Tayyip Erdoğan's controversial and allegedly polarising speeches at times of political crisis.

The Nationalist Movement Party claimed that they would consider an electoral alliance with the Felicity Party (SP) and the Great Union Party (BBP), but said nothing regarding the Conservative Ascension Party (MYP), which had long called for a union of nationalist parties. In the end, the MHP decided not to pursue a formal electoral alliance, but said it was open to defectors from any party. The MYP subsequently announced support for the MHP. The BBP has since decided to contest the election under the SP banner, and will thus be absent from the ballot papers. The Nation and Justice Party (MİLAD) planned to join the SP and BBP, but it did not actualise. The new electoral alliance between these parties was named the National Alliance (Millî İttifak). The candidate lists were drawn up such that BBP candidates were placed top in electoral districts in which they won more votes than the SP in 2011, while SP candidates were placed top in provinces in which the SP had beaten the BBP in 2011. This meant that an SP candidate was placed first in 55 provinces, while a BBP candidate was placed first in 30. The remaining positions subsequently alternated between SP and BBP candidates.

The True Path Party (DYP) expressed its intention to form an alliance with six other parties in order to overcome the 10% election threshold. The party's leader Çetin Özaçıkgöz met with the leaders of the Centre Party, Rights and Equality Party (HEPAR) and the Great Union Party (BBP).

== MPs standing down ==
The 2015 general election was the fourth general election contested by the governing incumbent Justice and Development Party (AKP). Since the party observes a by-law that imposes a three-term limit on its MPs, AKP parliamentarians elected in 2002, 2007 and 2011 were unable to seek re-election in 2015. Many AKP MPs standing down due to the three-term rule were either former or serving ministers, nine of which were serving in the outgoing First Davutoğlu Cabinet. The Peoples' Democratic Party (HDP) observes a two-term limit, meaning that all MPs elected in 2007 from the Thousand Hope Candidates block and re-elected in 2011 from the Labour, Democracy and Freedom Block were unable to contest the election from within the HDP party lists.

Despite the party-specific term limits, numerous MPs declined to run again despite being eligible to. Most of these candidates came from the Republican People's Party (CHP), from which 15 of its 125 MPs did not submit applications for re-election.

== Campaigns ==
On 5 January 2015, the Supreme Electoral Council of Turkey announced that the general election would take place on 7 June and also released a decision in regards to the process for standing as a candidate. Senior judicial officials including judges, municipal mayors, municipal and provincial councillors and senior members of any public supervisory board must present their resignation or retirement applications to their employer by 10 February 2015 in order to be eligible to stand. The candidacy of Atilla Sertel, who was elected as the CHP's 6th candidate in İzmir's second electoral district, was annulled by the Supreme Electoral Council for attending a press association general assembly after this deadline.

On 20 January, the Supreme Electoral Council ruled that candidates wishing to stand as an independent must resign any party memberships they may hold.

The first set of campaigning restrictions came into effect ten days before the election on 28 May, with opinion polls being banned and meaning that last-minute swings could not be tracked. The last political rallies were held on Friday 5 June and the campaigns formally ended at 18:00 local time on 6 June 2015. Voting subsequently took place between 07:00 and 17:00 local time on Sunday 7 June 2015.

=== Justice and Development Party (AKP) ===
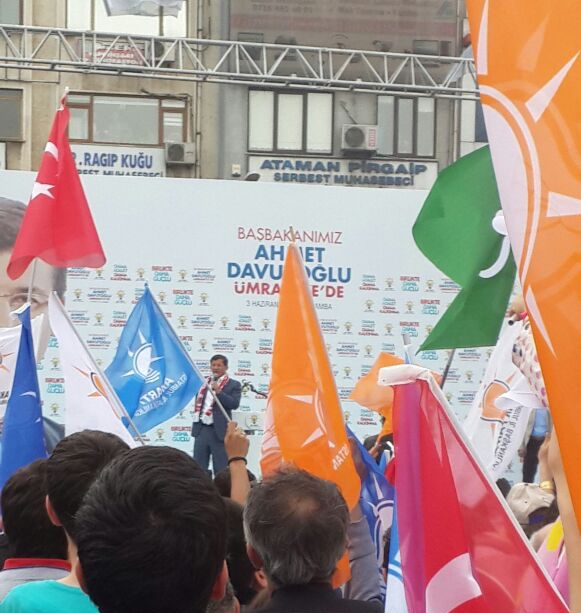
The AKP holding an electoral rally in Ümraniye, Istanbul, 3 June 2015

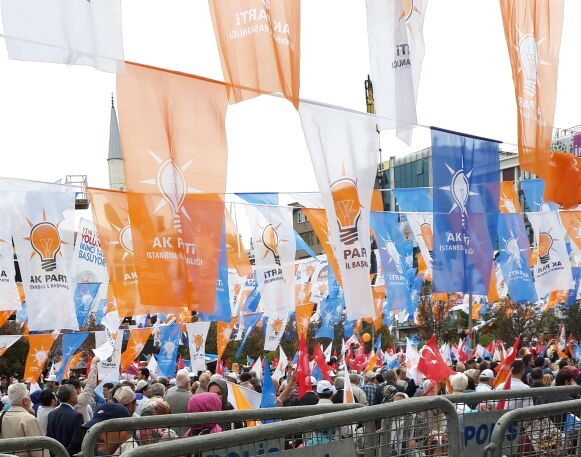
AKP flags and supporters during an electoral rally, 3 June 2015

Prime Minister Erdoğan, who was re-elected for a third time in the 2011 general election, was barred from standing as an MP for a fourth term by the AKP's by-laws. Erdoğan became his party's presidential candidate for the 2014 presidential election and won narrowly in the first round with 51.79% of the vote. His ascension to the presidency required him to sever all ties with political parties and step down from parliament, requiring the AKP to elect a new leader. Foreign Minister Ahmet Davutoğlu was announced as a candidate for the leadership by the party's Central Executive Committee on 21 August and was unanimously elected unopposed during the party's 1st Extraordinary Congress held on 27 August.

The AKP has publicly targeted 330 seats in order to be able to submit constitutional changes to a referendum. With drafting a new constitution being a central part of the AKP's manifesto, the party is expected to promote a presidential system and an advancement in the Solution process with Kurdish rebels in a new constitution. Critics have argued that such efforts would lead to a further decline in the separation of powers and democratic checks and balances, while the AKP has argued that the current constitution is outdated. Despite being constitutionally barred from being partisan, President Recep Tayyip Erdoğan made several statements in the lead-up to the election that set the AKP's electoral targets higher at 400 MPs, though even pro-AKP polling organisations show that such an eventuality is highly unlikely. Announcing the party's manifesto on 15 April, Davutoğlu claimed that his party aimed to win 55% of the votes, and criticised Kılıçdaroğlu for his target of 35%. The party held its first electoral rally in Erzurum on 25 April. President Erdoğan also held its own 'public opening' rallies throughout the country, where he was accused of making partisan statements in favour of the AKP. His excuse of 'public opening' was branded as a farce by the opposition, which accused Erdoğan of breaching presidential neutrality.

Due to the AKP by-law that had barred Erdoğan from standing for a third term, 70 other AKP MPs who had served since 2002 were also unable to contest the election. The AKP continued its policy of renewing its parliamentary candidates by deselecting 105 of its serving MPs, notably including controversial Balıkesir MP Tülay Babuşcu. 99 of the AKP's 550 parliamentary candidates were women. Notable yet unsuccessful applicants were singer İbrahim Tatlıses, former model Tuğçe Kazaz, Ankara Mayor Melih Gökçek's son Osman Gökçek and former Undersecretary to the National Intelligence Organisation (MİT) Hakan Fidan. President Erdoğan's son-in-law and former CHP leader Deniz Baykal's chief advisor were selected as AKP candidates.

In the run-up to the election, the media observed a potential disagreement between the AKP government and President Erdoğan, with Deputy Prime Minister Bülent Arınç openly criticising Erdoğan's comments on the ongoing Solution process with Kurdish rebels. Erdoğan's allegedly critical stance on government policy was widely perceived to be an attempt to win back nationalist voters who had defected to the MHP. A polemic subsequently took place between Arınç and Ankara Mayor Melih Gökçek, with Gökçek demanding the former's resignation for criticising the President and accusing him of being a follower of Fethullah Gülen. Despite a statement from Prime Minister Davutoğlu warning both men to end their arguments, Arınç made a statement accusing Gökçek of bringing personal and family issues into the political sphere and attempting to secure parliamentary candidacy for his son, for which he would not respect the Prime Minister's demands. The Ankara Attorney General began a criminal investigation into both individuals, though Arınç has parliamentary immunity from prosecution until the election.

The party's manifesto emphasises the need for an updated, civil constitution and a presidential system. Turkish nationalists particularly criticised the party's apparent commitment to remove the word 'Turk' from the constitution. The manifesto was accompanied by a 100-point 'New Turkey Contract' that outlined the party's key constitutional amendment proposals. Other policies included raising pensions, investing in infrastructure, continue developing the Kanal Istanbul project and expand Turkey's high speed rail system and 4G coverage despite President Erdoğan's insistence that 4G would be a waste of time. The manifesto also commits to a greater foreign policy role in the Middle East and North Africa and continuing to aim for European Union membership.

=== Republican People's Party (CHP) ===
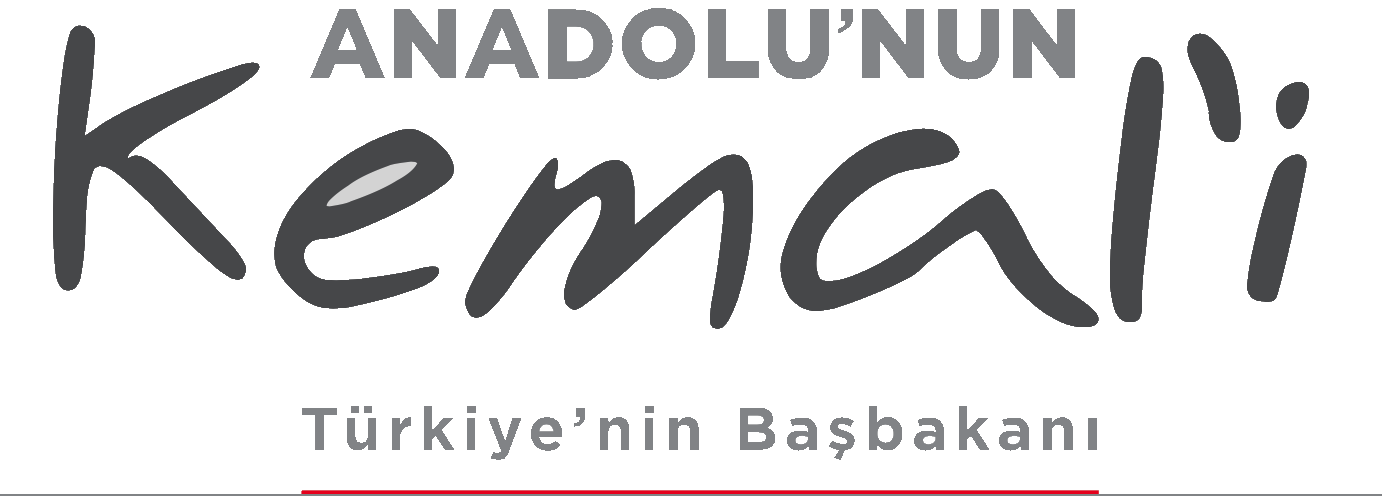
Logo of the Anadolu'nun Kemal'i documentary about the early life and career of the CHP leader Kemal Kılıçdaroğlu

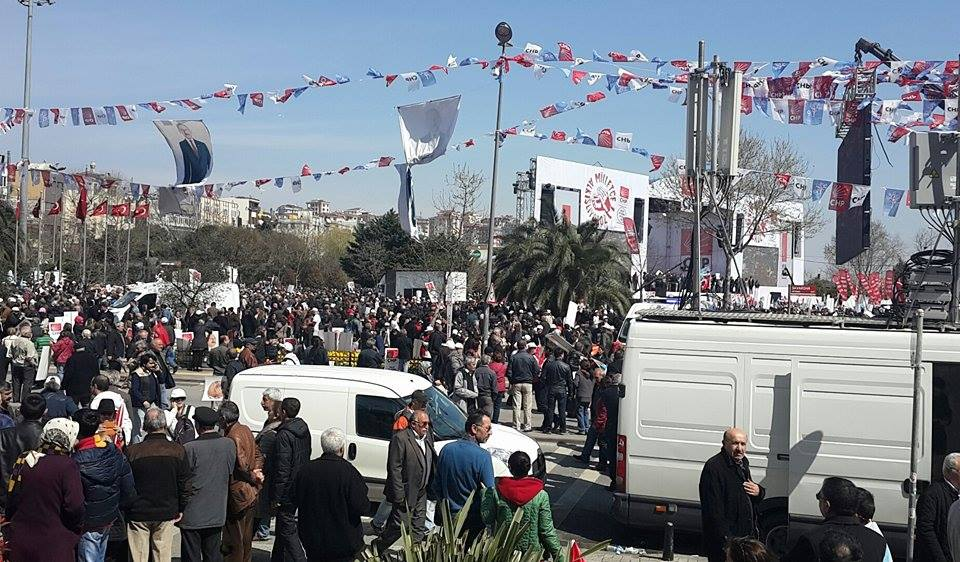
The CHP's Milletçe Alkışlıyoruz electoral rally in Kartal, Istanbul, 11 April 2015

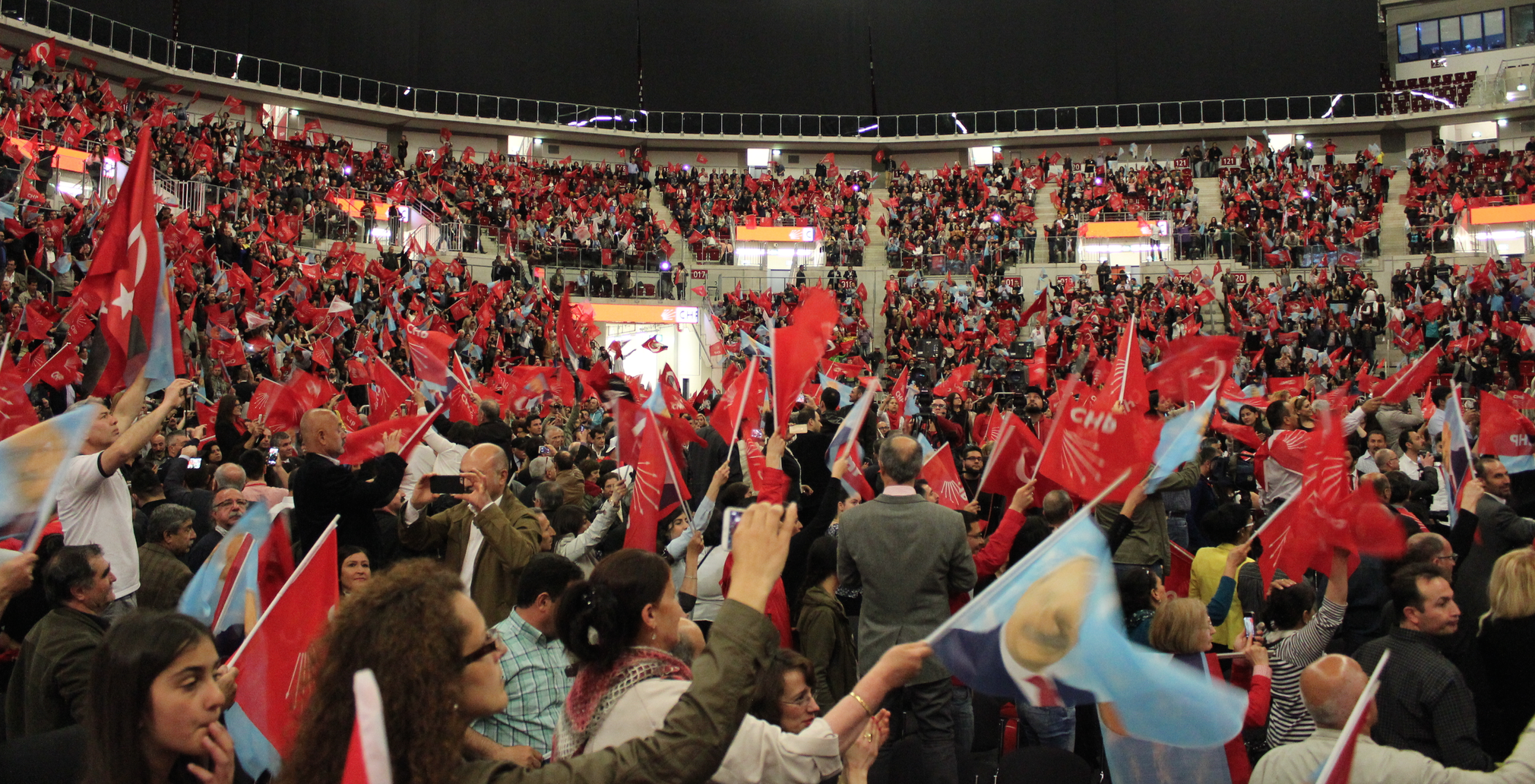
CHP electoral rally in Düsseldorf, Germany, 25 April 2015

The party leader Kemal Kılıçdaroğlu stated that his party would lead the next government if they won 35% of the vote. This indicates a 9% rise since the 2011 general election. Kılıçdaroğlu had been re-elected as leader during the party's 18th Extraordinary Convention held in September 2014, which had been convened after the party's poor performance in the 2014 local elections and the 2014 presidential election. On 28 March 2015, the CHP released a documentary named Anadolu'nun Kemal'i (The Kemal of Anatolia) about the early life and career of their party leader.

Candidate applications ended on 2 March 2015 with 2,822 applications. Party lists were selected either by the party leader or though preliminary elections that were held in 51 provinces. Kılıçdaroğlu himself decided to contest preliminary elections in İzmir's 2nd electoral district. Candidates who applied for selection by the party leadership were chosen in early April. Key candidates such as Kamer Genç, Hüseyin Aygün and Umut Oran failed to make the party lists. A female Armenian candidate and a Romani candidate were both amongst the CHP lists, with the potential to become the first female Armenian and Romani MP in the history of the Turkish Republic.

The CHP has expressed interest in negotiating with the left-wing HDP as well as other left-wing parties such as the Labour Party (EMEP) and the Freedom and Solidarity Party (ÖDP). Despite this, CHP leader Kemal Kılıçdaroğlu identified the HDP as a threat to the party's support base during a Central Executive Committee meeting on 29 January and has sought to take 'measures' against the HDP. The ÖDP has ruled out negotiating with the CHP while the EMEP leader Selma Gürkan has stressed the importance of doing so. Despite key HDP leaders being opposed to talks with the CHP, the party's deputy leader Sezgin Tanrıkulu was allegedly engaged in closed negotiations with the HDP so that the talks do not generate controversy within the party's parliamentary group or voters.

In March 2015, a document allegedly regarding a closure case against the Republican People's Party was leaked online, causing many opposition politicians to accuse the AKP of attempting to eliminate competition through anti-democratic practices. The party's leader Kemal Kılıçdaroğlu confirmed the claims, stating that he had known about the preparations for a closure case for some time. AKP leader Ahmet Davutoğlu denied the claims and called for Kılıçdaroğlu to meet with him to put forward a constitutional amendment that would make it impossible for a political party to be shut down by the courts.

The government has consistently accused the CHP of allegedly maintaining links with exiled cleric Fethullah Gülen and his Cemaat Movement. A former ally of the AKP and widely known for his influence in the Turkish judiciary, Gülen had allegedly sought to increase influence over the CHP after falling out with Erdoğan in 2013. The difference between Gülen's Islamist and the CHP's secular ideology resulted in inner-party controversy and led to the resignation of İzmir MP Birgül Ayman Güler in January 2015. The party voiced support Bank Asya, a pro-Gülen bank that the AKP government attempted to shut down in 2014 and also applied to visit the head of the pro-Gülen Samanyolu TV in Silivri Prison. The CHP planned 50 electoral rallies throughout Turkey in what Kılıçdaroğlu styled as a 'meeting marathon' (Miting maratonu). During visits to different provinces, Kılıçdaroğlu is also due to make unplanned visits to town centres and other public places to meet with voters directly. Special measures were taken for people with disabilities, with the party accompanying its televised electoral rallies with sign language. The party's inaugural electoral rally was held on 11 April in the Kartal district of Istanbul. The rally was styled as the 'National Applause rally' (Milletçe Alkışlıyoruz mitingi). During the rally, Kılıçdaroğlu appeared to unveil a new slogan, 'Do not be afraid, do not give up, do not cower' (Korkmayın, yılmayın, sinmeyin). The CHP has also targeted to win votes from the centre-right.

The CHP manifesto announced on 19 April includes measures to increase disability benefits, the minimum wage to ₺1,500 and to extend general health insurance to 3.2 million people in order to combat poverty. A significant pledge made by Kemal Kılıçdaroğlu, signed by a notary, is to grant payouts to pensioners twice a year on Eid al-Fitr and Eid al-Adha. The party also planned to abolish the controversial 'Taşeron' workers contract in order to guarantee workers' rights. The party aims to lower inflation to 4% and unemployment to 5%. On 21 May, the CHP announced a new 'cenetarian project' under the slogan 'Central Turkey' (Merkez Türkiye), aspiring to build a new city to serve as a trade hub between Europe, Asia and other continents. The project would give construction jobs to 2.2 million workers and targets a population of 3 million, due to be complete by 2035.

=== Nationalist Movement Party (MHP) ===
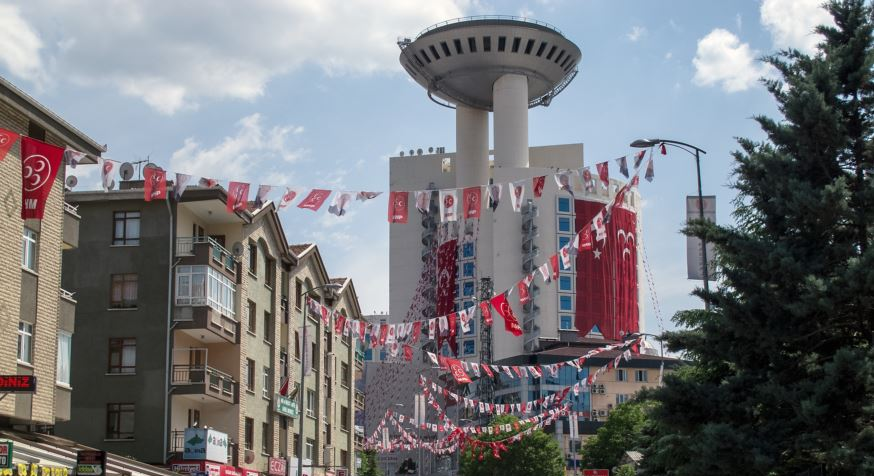
MHP party flags in Ankara with the party's headquarters in the background

The MHP has implemented one of the lowest application fees of any party for potential candidates. Between 12 and 18 March, all male, female and disabled citizens wishing to apply had to pay a fee of ₺2,000. The MHP had charged ₺2,500 in the 2011 general election. In response to plans to build a hotel in a greenfield site at İstinye in Istanbul, the MHP organised a seed-planting protest in the area in January. Actor Mehmet Aslan allegedly declared his potential candidacy during the event.

The MHP has been predicted to build on its success in the 2014 local elections and significantly improve its vote share, with support coming from former AKP nationalist voters who are disillusioned with the Kurdish peace process. the MHP leader Devlet Bahçeli claimed that there was a very low possibility that such voters would return to the AKP, accusing the AKP of continuously changing ideologies from the Islamist National View to the more moderate Conservative democracy. The MHP has strongly targeted the AKP in their campaign, accusing the Supreme Electoral Council of severing no-one apart from Recep Tayyip Erdoğan and vowing to bring violations of the law to justice in the future. Such promises include the sending of Erdoğan to the Court of Cassation and turning the new presidential palace into a museum about Atatürk and the Republic. The MHP began its electoral rallies on 6 May in the north of the country, with Bahçeli also making stops at local cafes during his campaign to directly meet with voters. Bahçeli endorsed the new legal process that had begun against the Gülen Movement, though criticised the AKP due to their previous relations with the Movement.

In May, the AKP appeared to have started a smear campaign against Meral Akşener, one of the MHP's most prominent politicians, claiming to be in possession of a video recording of her with private content. Akşener subsequently began legal proceedings against two pro-government journalists whom she accused of starting the defamation campaign against her. One of these journalists, Latif Erdoğan, claimed that the Gülen Movement had obtained the recording to blackmail Akşener, though both Akşener and Gülen's lawyer denied the claims and accused them of being baseless.

The MHP's manifesto pledged to extend education to nine years and to end the Solution process with Kurdish militants. In their constitutional reform proposals, the party promised to keep a constitutional reference to the Turkish ethnicity while not allowing other minorities to obtain constitutional recognition. Pressing for a manufacturing based economy, the MHP has also pledged to investigate every individual involved in the 2013 government corruption scandal and to establish an anti-corruption commission to lead the investigation. The MHP has also promised a strong, international response to terrorism and to raise the minimum wage to ₺1,400.

The MHP spent over ₺40 million of the ₺77 million it obtained from the Treasury on its election campaign, holding a rally in Rize for the first time in 20 years. In the space of one month (between 6 May and 6 June), the MHP conducted election rallies in 60 provinces, with one clashing with a HDP rally in Mersin. Numerous breakouts of violence between MHP and HDP supporters were also documented in their respective election events. One of the MHP's election songs was an adaptation of the popular Turkish folk music song Ankara'nın Bağları.

=== Peoples' Democratic Party (HDP) ===
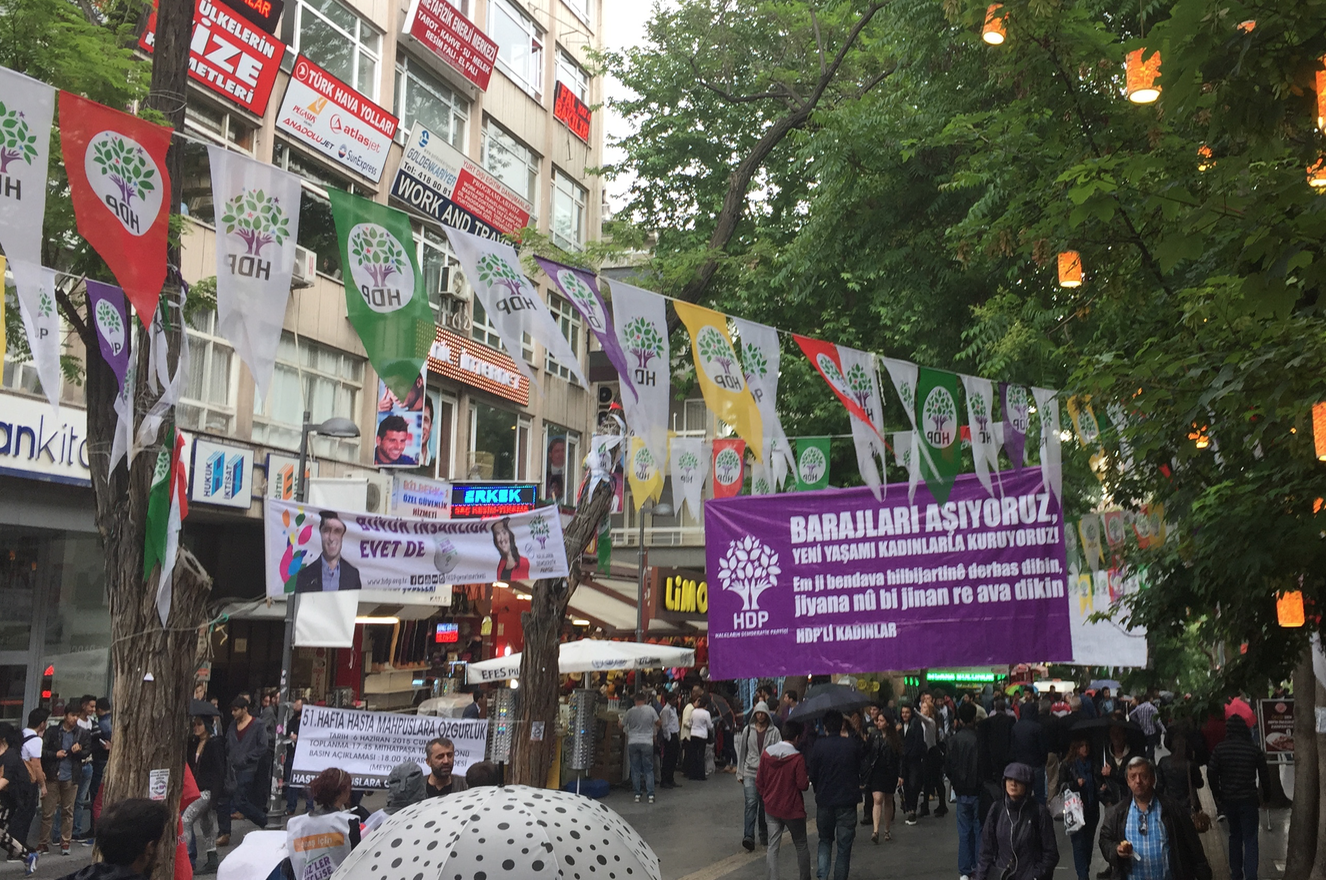
HDP election propaganda in Ankara, 5 June 2015.

Emboldened by the 9.77% of the vote won by Peoples' Democratic Party co-leader Selahattin Demirtaş in the 2014 presidential election, The HDP contested the election by fielding party candidates rather than independent candidates. This was controversial since most of the HDP's votes would have been transferred to the AKP in the event that the HDP failed to win above 10% of the vote. There was speculation as to whether the AKP forced Öcalan to pressure the HDP to contest the election as a party in order to boost their own number of MPs. The party charged a ₺2,000 application fee for prospective male candidates, a ₺1,000 fee for female and young candidates under the age of 27 and no fee was collected from disabled applicants. Applications for candidacy were received between 16 February and 2 March.

According to Habertürk, the party has proposed to field Kurdish candidates in the west and Turkish candidates in the east, which is the opposite of the demographic make-up of the country. The party is also expected to increase its popularity by offering candidacies to famous individuals, such as actor Kadir İnanır. According to a private poll conducted by the HDP in January 2015, the party needs to gather around 600,000 more supporters by the general election in order to surpass the election threshold of 10% and win 72 MPs. Polling organisations such as Metropoll, however, predict that the party would win around 55 MPs if they won more than 10%. HDP candidates hoped that the victory of the left-wing SYRIZA in the 2015 Greek legislative election in January would result in a boost in popularity.

In order to maximise their votes, the party's co-leader Figen Yüksekdağ announced that the HDP would begin negotiations with the United June Movement, a socialist intellectual and political platform that includes left-wing parties such as the Freedom and Solidarity Party (ÖDP) and the Labour Party (EMEP). Negotiations between these parties started in early 2015, with the intention of forming a broad alliance rather than a strict political coalition. Although Yüksekdağ ruled out negotiating with the CHP since they were 'closed to dialogue' and Demirtaş was opposed to negotiations, CHP deputy leader Sezgin Tanrıkulu said that the CHP was open for talks and that the two parties had until 7 April to come to an agreement. In the end, no such initiative was taken.

The HDP party's manifesto pledged to create a Ministry of Women and to establish 8 March International Women's Day as a national holiday. The party also promised to abolish the Presidency of Religious Affairs and the Council of Higher Education while reforming the university examination system to make universities more democratic and affordable. The party has also proposed policies to counter homophobia, to open the border with Armenia, to stop all investment into nuclear power, to raise the minimum wage to ₺1,800, reduce the maximum weekly working hours to 35, to establish a co-Prime Ministerial system for parties with more than one leader and to introduce elections to elect provincial governors (currently appointed by the government). On the issue of a presidential system, HDP co-leader Selahattin Demirtaş stated that the HDP would never support such a constitutional change, adding that he had always firmly opposed a presidential system despite allegations that the HDP had agreed to support the AKP on the matter behind closed doors.

=== Other parties ===
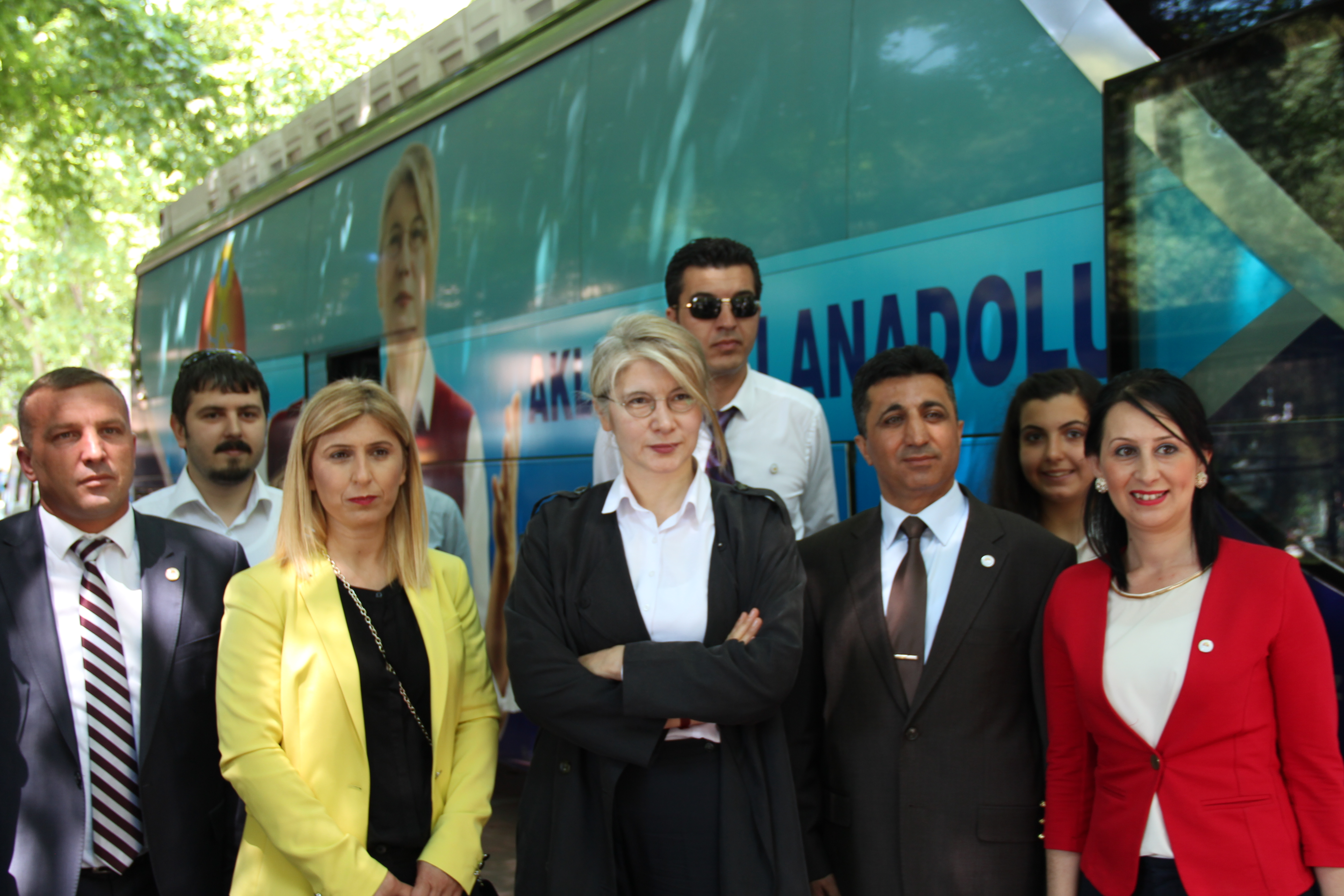
Anatolia Party leader Emine Ülker Tarhan campaigning with parliamentary candidates in Kocaeli

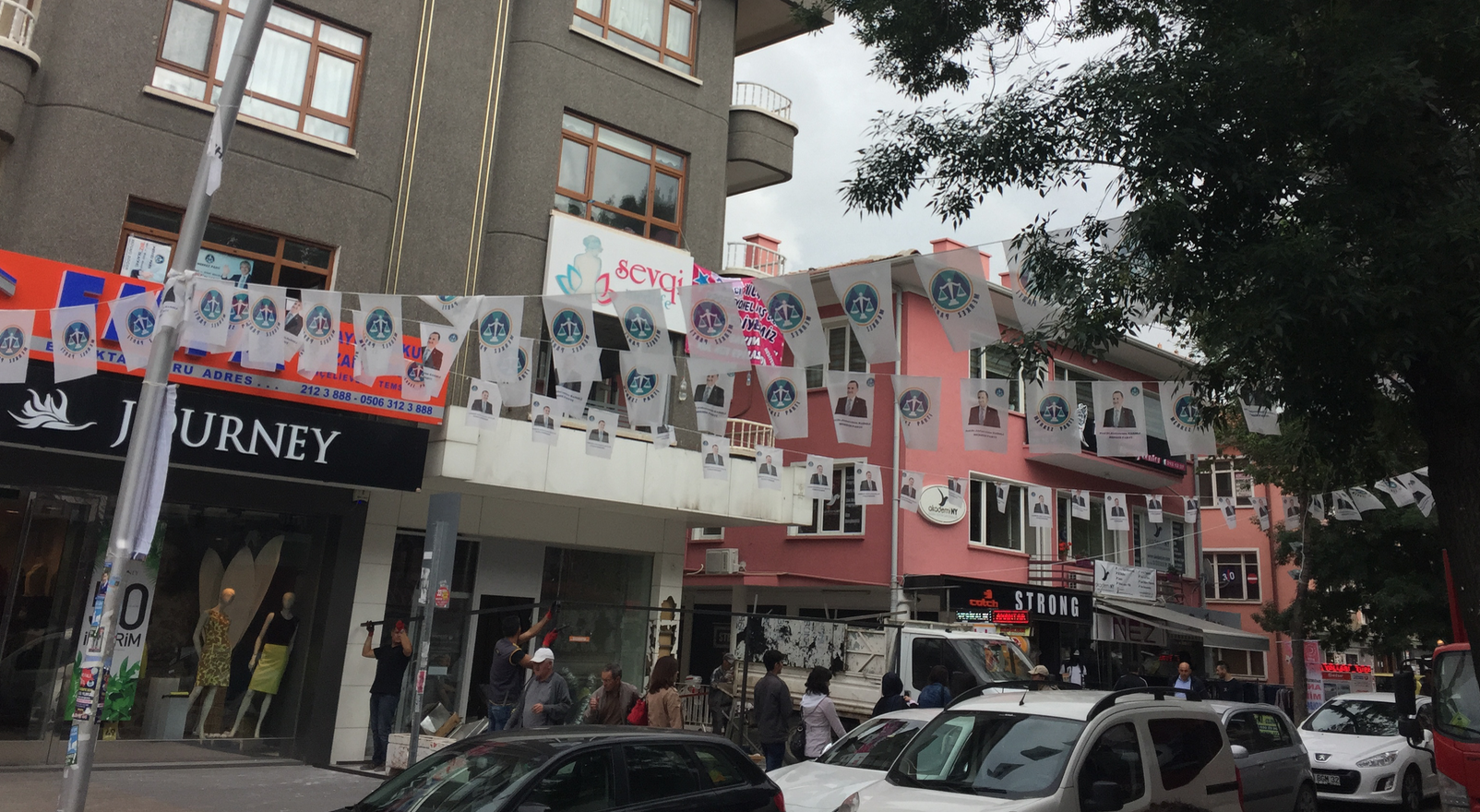
Centre Party flags in Ankara, 5 June 2015

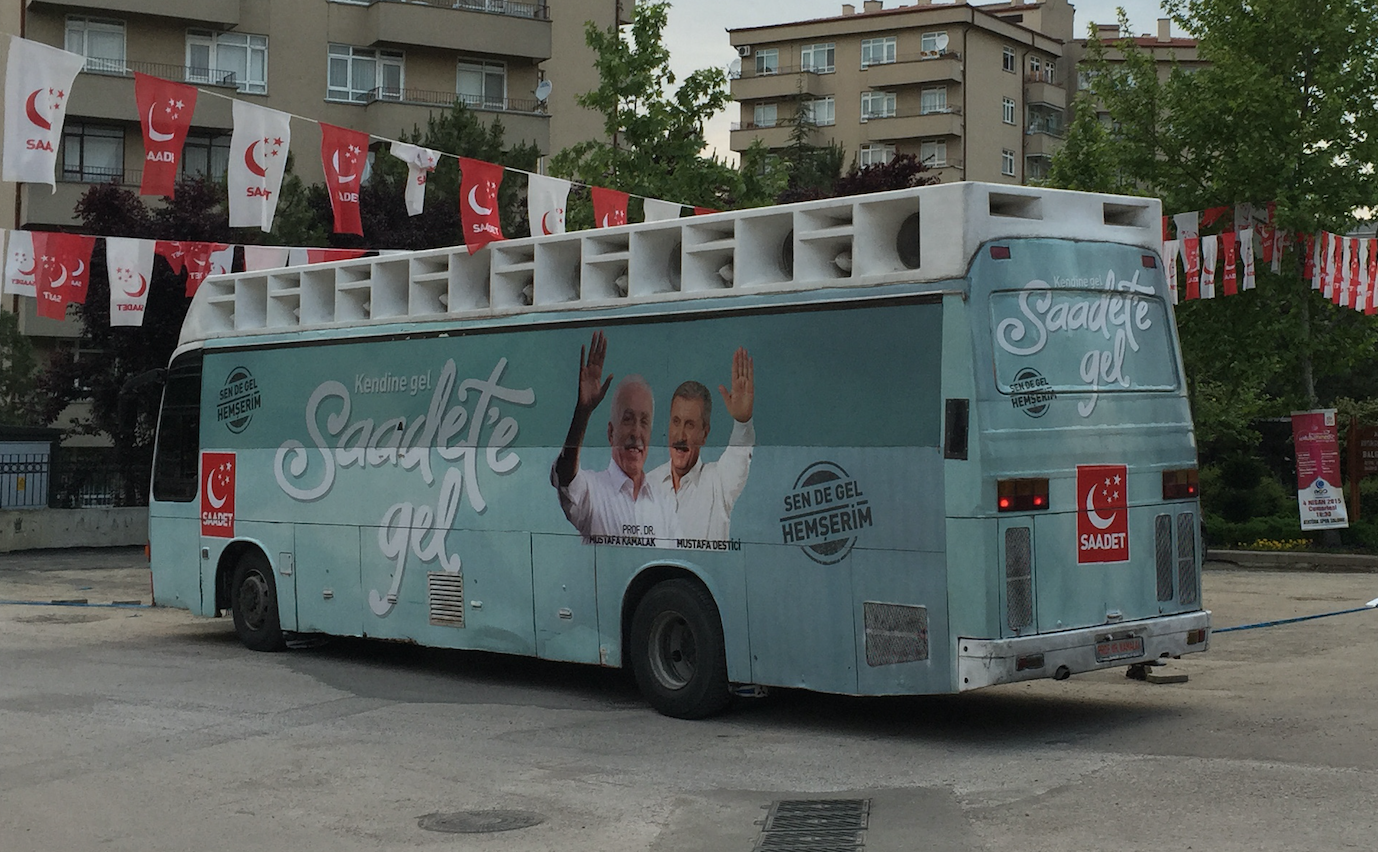
Felicity Party campaign bus and flags outside their headquarters in Ankara, 6 June 2015

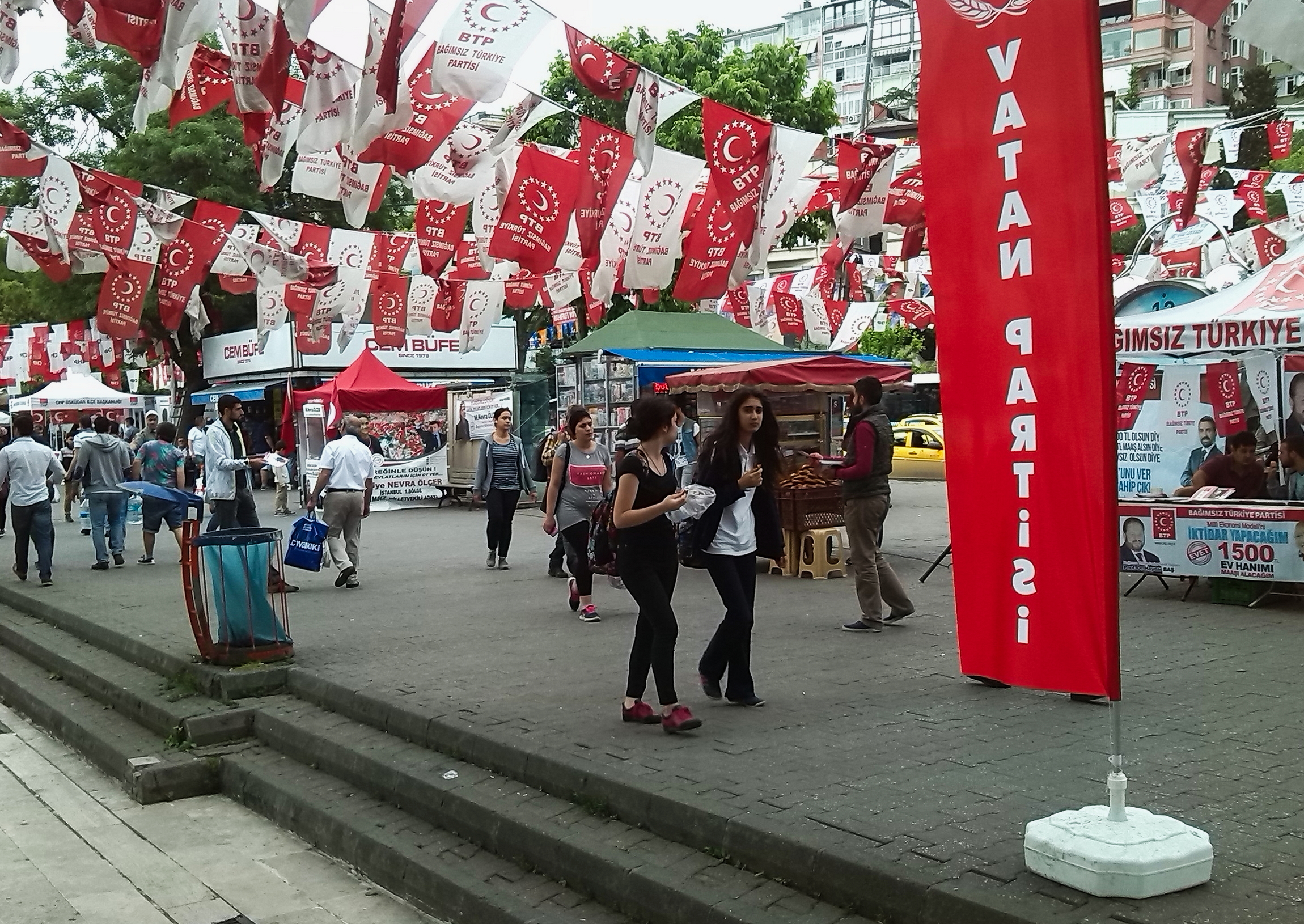
The Turkish general elections campaigns of the parties Bağımsız Türkiye Partisi (BTP) and Vatan Partisi in Istanbul in June 2015.

The Democratic Left Party (DSP), having declined to enter an electoral alliance with the CHP, made visits to trade unions and set its target to surpass the 10% election threshold. A DSP candidate in Isparta caused media attention after he posed with a glass of rakı in a campaign poster, arguing that it was a protest against the declining values of Mustafa Kemal Atatürk. The party's leader Masum Türker claimed that the abolition of the Presidency of Religious Affairs would cause division in Turkey and also predicted that an early election would occur after 7 June since no party would win a majority.

Having formed an electoral alliance under the name National Alliance (Millî İttifak), the Felicity Party (SP) and the Great Union Party (BBP) campaigned on a religious platform. SP leader Mustafa Kamalak and BBP leader Mustafa Destici held joint electoral rallies. It was reported on 29 May that an Alliance electoral rally at Bartın had been cancelled due to no turnout, though the Alliance released a statement stating that there had been no rally planned in Bartın on that day. The Alliance became the first ever party or alliance in Turkey to release a 'vocal manifesto' online. Arguing for a return to Necmettin Erbakan's ideology of National View (Millî Görüş), the Alliance blamed the AKP for having a hand in the growing unrest in the Middle East and criticised CHP leader Kemal Kılıçdaroğlu for accusing the Alliance of being 'enemies of Islam'. An Alliance candidate from Sivas claimed that they would complain to the Constitutional Court should they not surpass the 10% threshold.

The left-wing Patriotic Party (VP) campaigned on a Kemalist platform, claiming that the CHP had strayed away from the principles of Mustafa Kemal Atatürk. Claiming that they would form 'Atatürk's government', with VP leader Doğu Perinçek stating that they would join the CHP as long as the party upheld Atatürk's principles. The party had changed its name from Workers' Party (İP) to Patriotic Party during a party congress on 15 February 2015. The VP also claimed that voting for the HDP would be the same as voting for the PKK terrorist organisation and accused the HDP of forcing a VP parliamentary candidate in Hakkâri to defect to them at gunpoint.

The Independent Turkey Party, led by Haydar Baş, campaigned on its policy of raising the minimum wage to ₺5,000 and claimed continuously that private polling results showed that the BTP was trailing above the 10% threshold. The Anatolia Party (ANAPAR), led by Emine Ülker Tarhan, claimed that they would surpass the 10% threshold and criticised the opposition parties for their ineffectiveness. Tarhan also promised to give young citizens 5 GB of free internet per month. The Centre Party (MEP), led by Abdurrahim Karslı, campaigned on the need for a fundamental reform of politics in Turkey and portrayed themselves as a political alternative to the established parties, mainly using the slogan 'New politics' (Yeni siyaset). The Liberal Democrat Party (LDP), led by Cem Toker, formed a partnership with an election monitoring volunteer organisation named Votes and Beyond (Oy ve Ötesi). The LDP provided Oy ve Ötesi volunteers with partisan LDP observer passes that were necessary for them to monitor the voting and counting processes.

== Conduct ==
AKP officials have stated that they intend to employ approximately 700–800 thousand election observers to oversee the voting and counting processes. On 28 October 2014, the Supreme Electoral Council of Turkey determined that one ballot box would be used per 360–380 voters, while villages that had a population of less than 400 would be able to collectively vote using one ballot box. The Electoral Council determined the number of ballot boxes used in the election to be 174,236, with 1,259,612 people employed to conduct the election.

=== Overseas voting ===
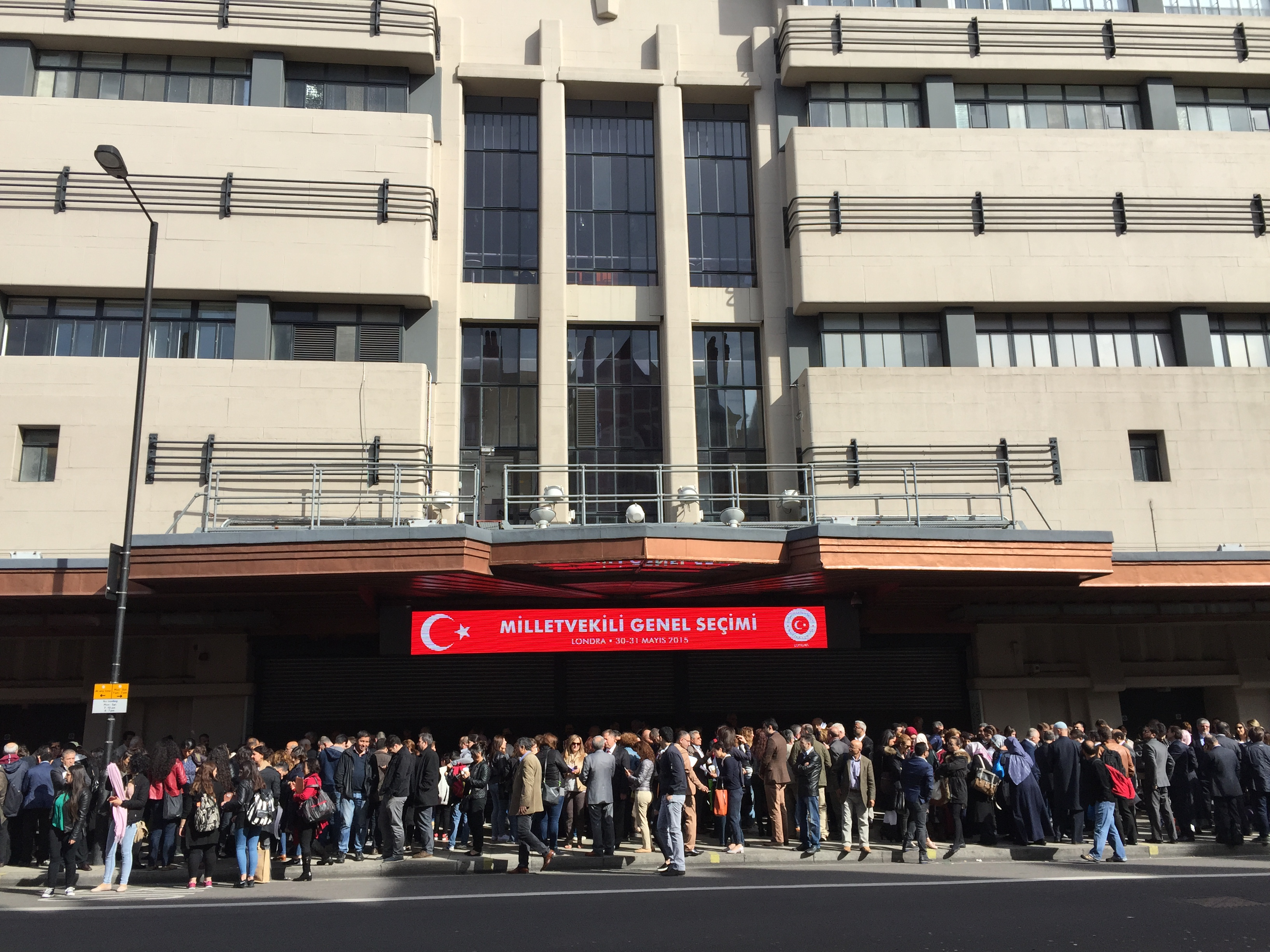
Turkish expats in the United Kingdom voting in Olympia, London on 30 and 31 May 2015

The Supreme Electoral Council scrapped the appointment-voting system that had been used in 2014 presidential election, where overseas citizens needed to book an appointment at a consulate to cast their votes. The system was blamed for the unexpectedly low turnout of less than 10% overseas compared to the 74.13% within Turkey. According to the new decision by the Council, overseas voters will be able to cast their votes up to 24 days before the actual general election within Turkey takes place without booking an appointment.

Voting abroad in 54 countries and 112 consulates began on 8 May and ended on 31 May, with different consulates choosing a time-frame appropriate for the number of registered voters in their respective country. Turkish voters in Germany, for example, were able to vote through the entire time allocated between 8 and 31 May, whereas voters in the United Kingdom were only able to vote on the weekend of 30–31 May due to the significantly smaller electorate in relation to Germany. This was the second Turkish election where Turkish expats were also able to vote. The votes cast overseas did not affect the parliamentary distribution since there are no overseas constituencies that elect members of parliament. Votes cast overseas only influenced the vote share, which could define whether or not a party passed the 10% election threshold and also the party that came first overall in the general election. Votes were flown and counted in Turkey after polls abroad closed on 31 May.

Turkish expats in Tunisia, who had been able to vote for the 2014 presidential election, were disenfranchised in time for the 2015 general election after an exceptionally poor turnout in 2014, with only 84 voters taking part in Tunis. Expats in Thailand, who had not been able to vote in the presidential election, were given the right to vote for the first time.

=== Election observation ===
The Organization for Security and Co-operation in Europe (OSCE) sent observers to monitor the election process. Despite raising concerns over media bias and the involvement of Recep Tayyip Erdoğan, the OSCE and the European Parliament commended the election process for being well organised. The OSCE was represented in Turkey by Ignacio Sánchez Amor and Vilija Aleknaitė-Abramikienė. European Parliament President Martin Schulz also observed the political developments and electoral process, declaring the election free and fair.

The speculation that the AKP were preparing for large-scale election fraud to keep the HDP out of parliament mainly originated from the hugely controversial 2014 local elections, which were marred by allegations of misconduct. However, the largely controversy-free general election was partly attributed to better preparation of the opposition parties for the election process. Furthermore, large-scale efforts by independent voters to monitor the election was also seen as significant, with organisations such as Oy ve Ötesi (Voting and Beyond) training volunteers to become election observers for polling day. Such organisations were also active during the overseas voting process.

== Opinion polls ==
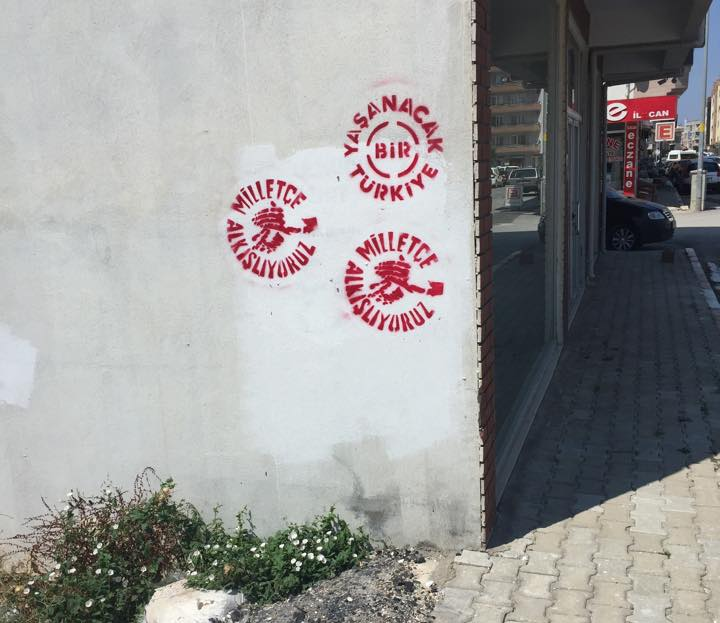
Street art depicting the CHP's two main campaign slogans, Milletçe Alkışlıyoruz (We applaud nationally) and Yaşanacak bir Türkiye (A liveable Turkey) in Seferihisar, İzmir

Opinion polls throughout the election campaign have consistently showed a strong AKP lead over the main opposition CHP. The AKP have polled mainly within the 40–50% band, with polls occasionally showing the party to exceed the 50% band or drop as low as 35% in some cases. These significant variations did not appear to be caused by any political revelation or development, but rather due to the methods and political leanings of different polling companies. The CHP have shown to have polled within the 20–30% band, occasionally breaching the 30% boundary but never reaching party leader Kemal Kılıçdaroğlu's target of 35%. Kılıçdaroğlu did, however, claim that private polling done by the party showed the CHP polling close to the 35% mark. Many polls showed a slight decrease in the CHP's vote share compared to their 2011 results of 26%. The MHP, having been perceived to have taken a significant number of votes from the AKP, have polled in the high teens, occasionally surpassing the 20% boundary. Critically, the HDP has hovered at around the 10% mark, which is also the election threshold that a party must win above to win representation in Parliament. Most polls have shown the HDP to be between 9 and 11%, while some have shown them to be as low as 6%. Overall, the parties' vote shares remained largely consistent throughout the election campaign, with the manifestos and rallies seeming to have made little difference to voting intentions. The CHP, however, did seem to observe a slight increase after announcing their Merkez Türkiye project on 21 May.

Opinion polling in Turkey remains controversial, with many politicians and commentators calling the polls a 'perception operation' (algı operasyonu) that was intended to convince voters that the AKP were significantly ahead of the opposition parties. Such tactics were also allegedly employed during the 2014 presidential election. These claims have been backed up by the fact that many polling companies do not even have any record of existence and most do not release a detailed breakdown of their polling. The issue of bogus opinion polls even led to a CHP advert late during the campaign to dissuade voters from voting in accordance to polling results.

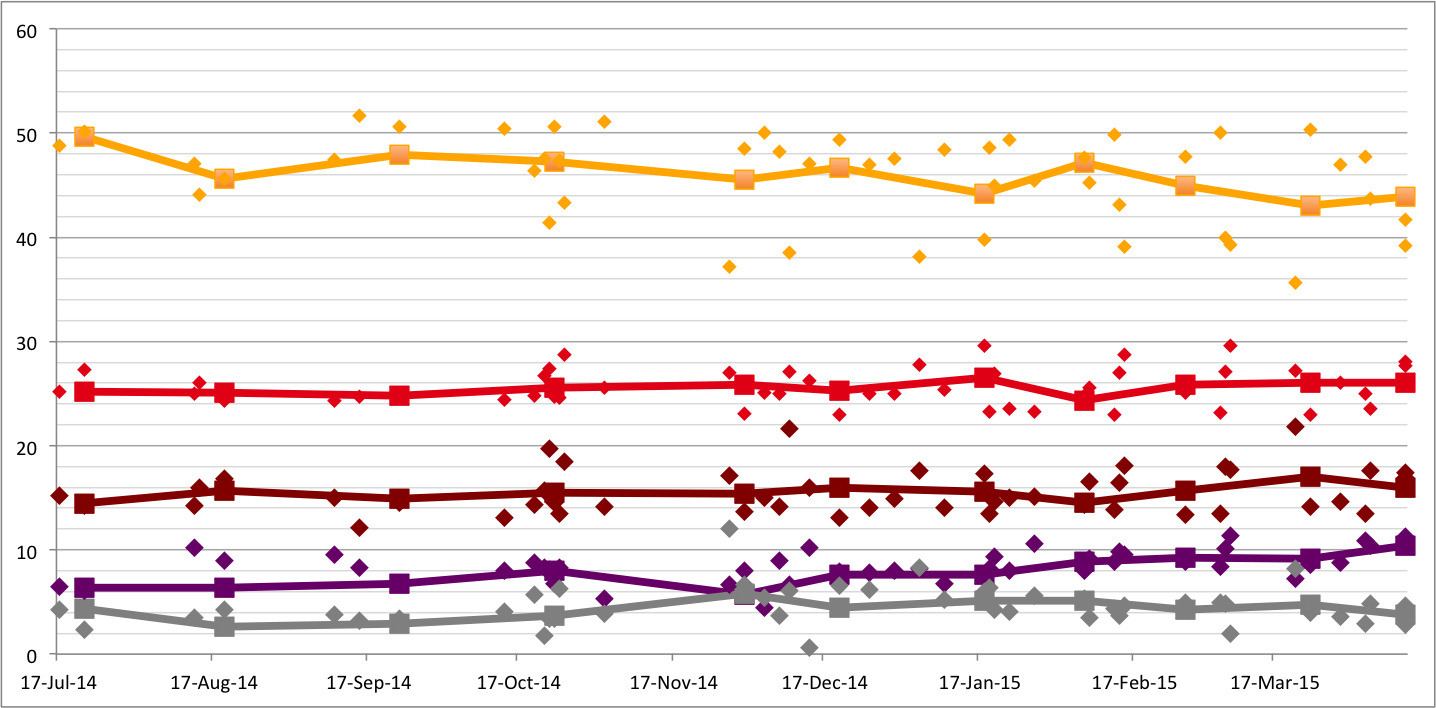
Opinion polling for the June 2015 general election

After the vote, the polling company ORC issued a statement of apology for failing to predict the actual result, having shown the AKP polling at over 50% of the vote and being set to win around 375 seats in some of their polls. KONDA was seen as the polling company that came the closest to predicting the actual result.

=== Final predictions before the vote ===
The following table shows the final polls published by the main pollsters before polling day on 7 June.

Party	AKAM 15–20 May	ANAR 27 May	AndyAr 21–24 May	Denge 16–24 May	Gezici 2 June	KamuAR 18–24 May	Konda 30–31 May	MAK 18–26 May	MetroPoll 8–11 May	ORC 30 May-1 June	SONAR 25 May
AKP	38.9	40.5	41.9	44.6	38.5	35.3	41.0	43.6	42.8	46.0	41.0
CHP	28.1	26.0	25.8	25.5	28.5	27.9	27.8	24.9	27.0	25.3	26.0
MHP	17.6	17.0	16.0	16.1	16.5	23.1	14.8	16.4	17.1	15.5	18.1
HDP	11.8	11.0	10.7	10.5	12.5	7.7	12.6	9.9	9.2	9.0	10.4
Others	3.6	5.5	5.6	3.3	3.0	6.0	3.8	5.2	3.9	4.2	4.5

Compared to the actual results (excluding overseas results), ANAR came closest to predicting the AKP's vote, MAK and ORC came closest to predicting the CHP's vote, Gezici managed to predict the MHP's vote share exactly and Konda came closest to predicting the HDP's vote, despite still being half a percentage point out. On predicting all four parties' vote shares, ANAR's poll had the least margins of error while KamuAR had the most.

== Controversies ==
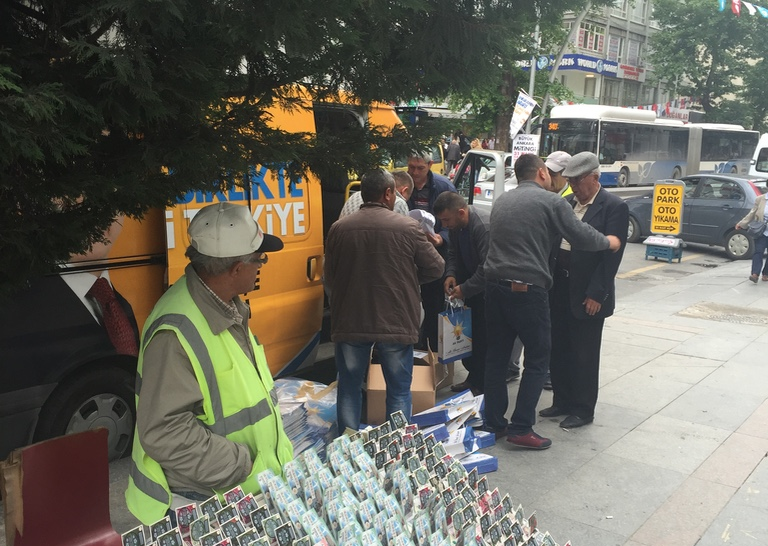
An AKP election van distributing free goods to voters in Ankara, 5 June 2015

The election campaign was overshadowed by allegations of planned electoral fraud, irregularities and the controversial involvement of President Recep Tayyip Erdoğan in the electoral process. Numerous politically motivated acts of violence and vandalism targeted party activists, candidates, vehicles and campaign offices. Prospects of electoral fraud was particularly significant during the election, due to the extensive fraud allegations made during the 2014 local elections and the fact that opinion polls suggested that the governing AKP may lose its parliamentary majority. Various irregularities throughout the campaign, such as the use of state funds by AKP politicians for campaigning, media bias, forced participation for the government's electoral rallies, incorrect voter data and the use of bogus opinion polls also raised concerns about the fairness of the election.

=== Pre-election irregularities ===
The Supreme Electoral Council of Turkey printed 73,988,955 ballot papers for an electorate of approximately 53 million, generating controversy over how spare ballot papers would be utilised. Allegations of media bias in favour of the governing AKP also caused controversy, with the state media regulator RTÜK stating that between 1 and 7 May, the state-owned Turkish Radio and Television Corporation (TRT) as well as several other channels had not broadcast a single opposition party election rally, instead focussing entirely on AKP ones. RTÜK had initially caused controversy in April after banning a CHP political advert for 'directly criticising the government', causing the CHP to seek legal action. Kanal D television presenter Cüneyt Özdemir claimed that the media was under both financial and moral intimidation by multiple sources, who he claimed were scared of a neutral and objective media. Campaigning limitations on opposition parties were also put in place by the governor of İzmir, who limited demonstrations and political propaganda to written forms only. The decisions were reversed after heavy protests on social media and a legal investigation into the limitations. Cases of opposition election stands being blocked, a MHP office in Rize being sealed off, opposition party flags being torn down and the involvement of Recep Tayyip Erdoğan during the campaigning process were also controversial. The alleged use of state funds by the AKP for campaigning, which is illegal under Turkish law, also caused controversy. Issues of the use of state vehicles for campaigning, the endorsement of the AKP by state institutions (such as municipalities and provincial governors), and the use of the İETT public busses in Istanbul to shuttle supporters to an AKP electoral rally were among the controversies. The use of cold calling and cold messages to invite individuals to watch political interviews or to participate in electoral rallies was also widespread, despite becoming illegal on 1 May 2015. A message sent to millions of people on 25 May with an invitation to watch an interview with Ankara Mayor Melih Gökçek resulted in the complaints hotline collapsing due to the surge in complaints being made about the advertisement.

Intimidation was also prevalent, with Kurdish separatist PKK militants allegedly raiding shops and cafes in the Kurdish-majority south east and demanding votes for the HDP. It was also alleged that the state-owned Anatolia Agency press organisation marked a voter's house in Diyarbakır after they said they would not vote for the HDP. Controversies also arose in regards to the HDP's political adverts, which were perceived to be threatening violence if the party didn't cross the 10% threshold and also regarding whether Recep Tayyip Erdoğan would invite the opposition to form a government should the AKP not win a parliamentary majority.

=== Electoral fraud ===
In March 2015, an unnamed AKP source close to one of the party's deputy leaders Süleyman Soylu revealed that his party had staged electoral fraud during the 2014 local elections and claimed that several AKP employees were uncomfortable with their tactics. The source claimed that the party had a 5-point plan for every election, consisting on releasing bogus opinion polls, intentionally miscalculating the number of votes during counting and sending incorrect results to the electoral council, the bribery and threatening of returning officers to stop the miscounting from being reported to the authorities, the misleading announcement of the AKP's scale of victory early on to incentivise demotivated opposition observers to abandon the ballot boxes and as the use of fake addresses and dead people as voters. The source also confirmed that the sharp rise in electricity cuts during election nights were deliberate and were intended to disrupt the counting process.

Numerous cases of misconduct during the voting process were recorded, with a man being arrested in Düsseldorf for attempting to vote more than once. On 3 June, the lists of 324 AKP activists who had allegedly been assigned to steal votes from certain ballot boxes was released on Twitter, with the AKP accused of plotting to steal 3,700,000 votes on election night. The AKP Deputy Leader Mustafa Şentop denied the allegations and stated that legal proceedings would begin into the leak.

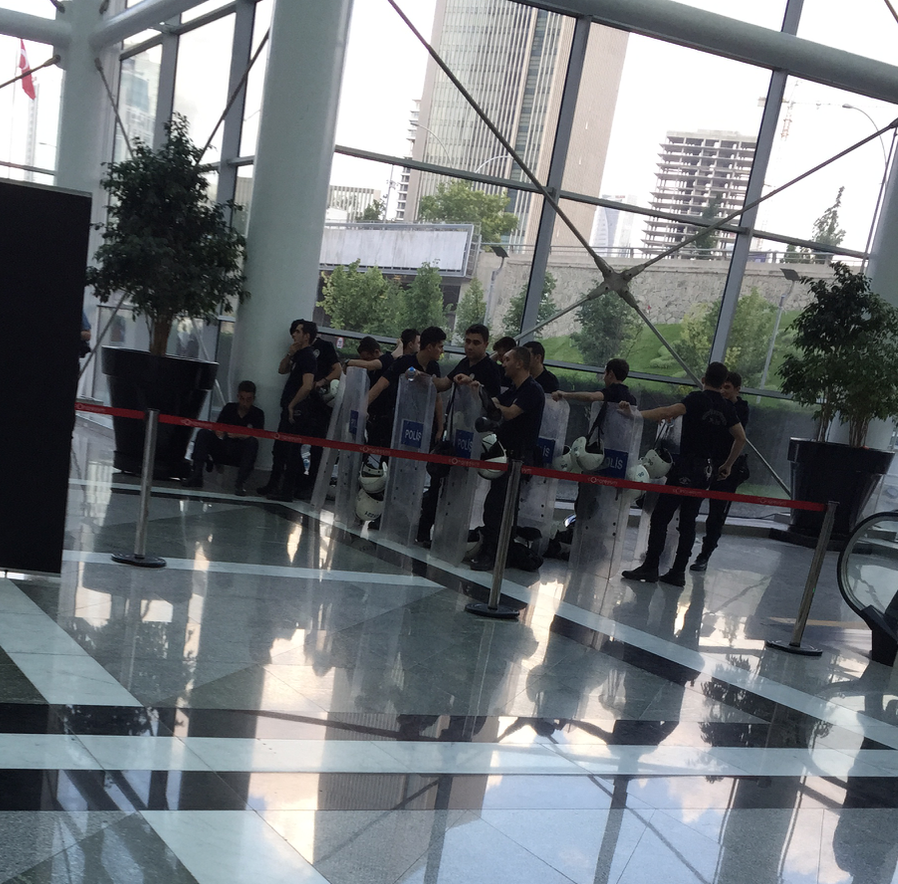
Riot police at the Ankara Chamber of Commerce after controversy broke out over the burning of 76 unrecorded votes that had been cast overseas

The volunteer election monitoring group Oy ve Ötesi claimed that the AKP had been recorded an extra 17,880 votes, the MHP 3,666 votes, the HDP 1,091 votes and the CHP 181 votes. The group also claimed that 6,018 votes for the Felicity Party (SP) had been unrecorded. In Muş, violence broke out after several HDP activists alleged that votes had been stolen in the province, with the police firing on the activists with tear gas. The President of the Sakarya Bars Association, Zafer Kazan, claimed on Twitter that two bags of votes had been stolen in Sakarya, with false results being recorded using forged signatures. After their seats in Kocaeli fell from two to one, the MHP demanded a re-count, with some activists claiming that election fraud had taken place in the province. A stamp, used to vote on ballot papers, was stolen from a polling station in Esenyurt, Istanbul, which could have potentially allowed the culprits to vote more than once on fake ballot papers. In Adıyaman, an individual who was filmed walking out of a polling station with a bag full of votes claimed that he was going to Mosque, but was violently apprehended by many voters who had arrived on the scene. The police later escorted the individual out of the hostile crowd. The CHP raised concern over the lack of up-to-date voter records, having identified 2,860 non-existent voters on the electoral rall in the Istanbul district of Kadıköy alone.

Controversy broke out in the Ankara Chamber of Commerce, where the overseas votes were being counted, when a ballot box that had been recorded to contain 200 votes was actually found to have 276 votes. In accordance to Turkish law, if the actual number of votes exceeds the recorded number, the count leader must choose votes at random and burn them until the numbers are equal. Violence subsequently breaking out, with several other counters who did not know the reason for the burning of votes alleging election fraud. With the tensions continuing to remain high, riot police were called to restore calm, with the burnt votes being impounded by the crime scene investigation unit. It was observed that the burnt votes also contained some cast for the AKP. Tensions also rose briefly after a count leader insisted that an invalid vote that had been cast for both the HDP and AKP should be counted as a valid vote for the HDP.

Despite these controversies, the lack of any serious cases of misconduct resulted in the OSCE commending the election for being well organised and the European Parliament declaring the election free and fair. This was partly attributed to the better preparation by opposition parties and the involvement of monitoring volunteer groups such as Oy ve Ötesi.

=== Political violence ===
As part of the growing political polarisation in Turkish politics, the election was marred by politically motivated acts of violence against party activists, candidates, vehicles and campaign offices. On 17 and 18 May, bombs exploded at the electoral rallies of the Peoples' Democratic Party (HDP) in Adana and Mersin, injuring three people, with the HDP accusing the government of being behind the attacks. HDP rallies and offices have also been subject to violence from Turkish nationalists, with HDP chairman Selahattin Demirtaş claiming that 41 HDP election offices had been subject to arson attacks since the party's establishment. Both AKP and CHP offices in Istanbul were subject to an armed attack before the election, while what was described as a 'lynching attempt' took place in Trabzon when AKP activists chased and threw stones at a CHP van for over an hour.

Candidates themselves were subject to violence, with AKP candidates visiting Van being forced to take refuge in a HDP party office after being greeted by boos and hostility from members of the public. The CHP's top candidate in Adana, Elif Doğan Türkmen, was shot on 27 May, though her injuries were not life-threatening. A similar stabbing attack took place against AKP candidate Ramazan Demir. Breakouts of violence between Kurdish nationalists and AKP activists, as well as Patriotic Party activists, also took place. On 24 April, an armed man waiting near a block of flats in Afyonkarahisar where Ahmet Davutoğlu's wife Sare Davutoğlu was due to visit was arrested on suspicion of a potential assassination attempt. The May Day protests in Istanbul, taking place on 1 May, were also met by a heavy-handed police crackdown, with a police van attempting to run over CHP MP Aykut Erdoğdu, who suffered a broken hand while demanding to go with activists who were in police custody. A MHP youth wing leader and Ege University student, Fırat Yılmaz Çakıroğlu was killed by PKK militants who raided the university in İzmir on 21 February. Protests and memorial services held in Çakıroğlu's memory were often met by a rise in tensions between Turkish and Kurdish nationalists.

=== Influence of Recep Tayyip Erdoğan ===
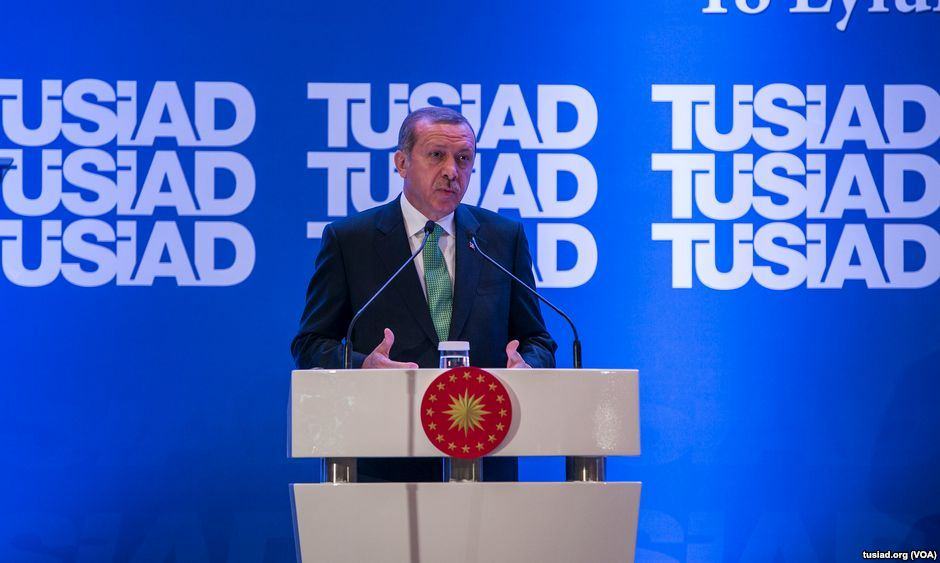
Erdoğan giving a speech at the Turkish Industrialists' and Businessmen's Association (TÜSİAD), December 2014

The founder and former leader of the AKP, Recep Tayyip Erdoğan, who served as prime minister between 2003 and 2014, was elected President in August 2014. The President of Turkey, as set out by the Constitution, must remain politically neutral and independent of any political party. Despite this, Erdoğan was heavily involved throughout the election campaign, holding controversial 'public opening' (toplu açılış) rallies in the run-up to the vote. The excuse of 'public openings' have been slammed as a farce by most opposition commentators, who claim that they are instead a ruse for Erdoğan to campaign for the AKP before the election. These claims are backed up by the fact that many new projects and infrastructure that are allegedly a part of these 'public opening' rallies have been exposed as non-existent or as already opened. It emerged that a solid waste dump in Amasya, which was a part of Erdoğan's opening ceremony in that province, had been officially opened five times. Controversy arose when the Prime Minister Ahmet Davutoğlu and Erdoğan held a joint rally in Hakkâri for the opening of Yüksekova Airport on 26 May. This particular rally, as well as other public opening rallies such as those in Denizli and Aydın, were also controversial since it emerged that public workers were forced to attend the rallies by their employers with the threat of legal action. The push for greater participation was allegedly due to the surprisingly low turnouts for Erdoğan's rallies in İzmir and Van.

During these rallies, Erdoğan mainly went about calling for a presidential system and criticising the opposition, with many thus claiming that he had broken the terms of his office. Implicitly calling on voters to elect 400 AKP MPs, he criticised the opposition parties for their promises to raise the minimum wage on May Day, though it also became evident that he didn't know how much it was himself. He also criticised the main opposition leader Kemal Kılıçdaroğlu for questioning his faith in the Quran and also criticised MHP leader Devlet Bahçeli for his calls for the resignation of Mehmet Görmez, the head of the Presidency of Religious Affairs. On 28 May, he made a statement criticising HDP's party lists, claiming 'we don't put forward transgender candidates!' His perceived reference to the AKP as 'we' was seen as an open disregard for neutrality. The CHP, MHP and HDP submitted formal complaints against Erdoğan's involvement in the political process on numerous occasions, but the Supreme Electoral Council refused to call off Erdoğan's rallies or issue him a warning.

Speculation was also raised about the influence Erdoğan had over the AKP campaign. Erdoğan allegedly demanded the government to put the Solution process that he had started as prime minister with Kurdish rebels on hold, having observed a significant defection of AKP voters to the MHP. After openly criticising the government for the Solution process, Erdoğan also openly denied the existence of a 'Kurdish problem' to win back nationalist votes, which faced open criticism from Deputy Prime Minister Bülent Arınç. Commentators observed a split between Erdoğan and the government on the issue of the party's candidates, with Erdoğan allegedly threatening to put Ahmet Davutoğlu in a 'worse situation than Ecevit' if 25 candidates close to Arınç were not removed from the party lists.

On 17 June, the newspaper Cumhuriyet claimed that the Presidency had spent ₺109 million on Erdoğan's rallies.

== Results ==
The election results produced Turkey's first hung parliament since 1999. A hung parliament had been widely speculated before the election, though the scale of the Peoples' Democratic Party (HDP) vote came as a surprise to most observers.

The results was the Justice and Development Party's worst result in terms of seats since the party's establishment in 2001. In terms of votes, it is the party's third worse result, after their 2002 general election and 2009 local election performance. Regardless, the party's vote share dropped by almost 9%, their worst decline in popular support in the party's history. Ahmet Davutoğlu had promised to resign if he did not retain a majority, with the party polling far below their target of 55% of the vote and 330 seats.

The Republican People's Party (CHP) also suffered a 1% loss in their vote share since 2011, falling short of Kemal Kılıçdaroğlu's target of 35% of the vote. The Nationalist Movement Party (MHP) saw an increase in their vote and seat share, having been projected to win over many disaffected AKP voters who were sceptical of the Solution process. Despite this, the fact that they won the same number of MPs as the HDP was seen as a disappointment for the party. The HDP managed to surpass the 10% election threshold with 13%, higher than expectations and mainly attributed to tactical voting by CHP and AKP voters to make sure that the party would surpass the threshold. A party needed 4,616,324 votes to win seats in this election.

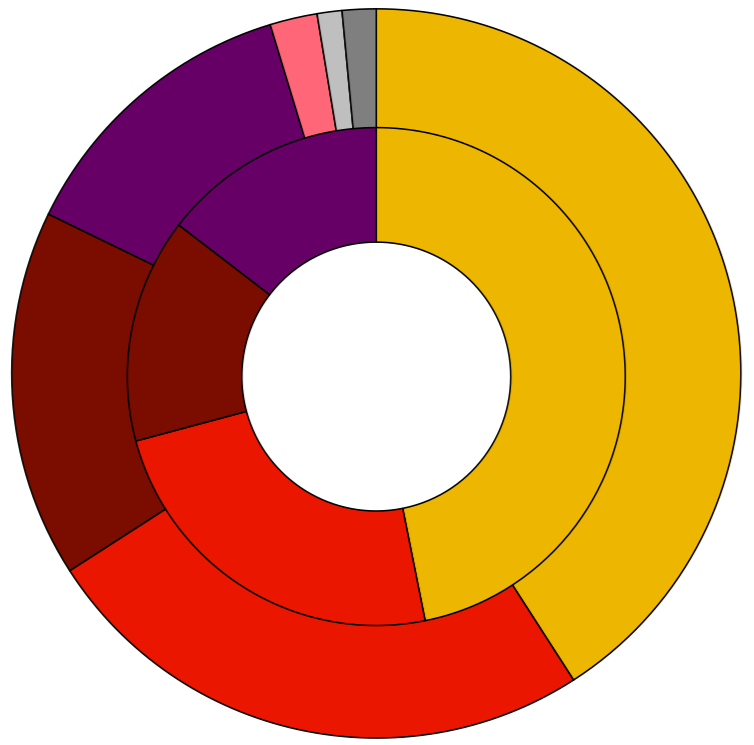
Votes won per party (outer ring) compared to seats won (inner ring)

Results for other smaller parties also came as a surprise, especially to the Felicity Party (SP). Although the SP had not been projected to pass the 10% threshold in opinion polls, it was still expected to reach 4–5% of the vote, with support mainly coming from more religious AKP supporters. Furthermore, the SP had entered the election in an alliance with the Great Union Party (BBP). These two parties, which ran separately in 2011, won a combined 2% of the vote in the last election (1.27% and 0.75% respectively). Coming fifth with 2.1% of the vote, the Alliance only managed to increase their vote share by 0.1%. Other parties that had been shown to potentially command significant support was the Patriotic Party polling at around 3%, the Independent Turkey Party, which leader Haydar Baş claimed was polling at around 11% and the Anatolia Party, which at one point was shown to be polling at around 8%. None of these parties managed to gain a significant share of the vote, ending up with 0.35%, 0.21% and 0.06% respectively.

This election was the first since 1995 in which no independent candidates were elected, mostly because the HDP decided to take the risk of running as a party. Former footballer and AKP MP Hakan Şükür, who resigned from his party following the 2013 government corruption scandal, came the closest to being elected with around 32,000 votes, running in Istanbul's 3rd electoral district. Osman Pamukoğlu, the leader of the Rights and Equality Party, ran as an independent to bypass the election threshold and won around 15,000 votes, submitting a complaint to the Electoral Council over the results.

Party	Votes	%	Seats	+/–
Justice and Development Party	18,867,411	40.87	258	–69
Republican People's Party	11,518,139	24.95	132	–3
Nationalist Movement Party	7,520,006	16.29	80	+27
Peoples' Democratic Party	6,058,489	13.12	80	+80
Felicity Party	949,178	2.06	0	0
Patriotic Party	161,674	0.35	0	New
Independent Turkey Party	96,475	0.21	0	New
Democratic Left Party	85,810	0.19	0	0
Democrat Party	75,784	0.16	0	0
Social Reconciliation Reform and Development Party	72,701	0.16	0	New
People's Liberation Party	60,396	0.13	0	New
Rights and Freedoms Party	58,716	0.13	0	New
True Path Party	28,852	0.06	0	0
Anatolia Party	27,688	0.06	0	New
Liberal Democrat Party	26,500	0.06	0	0
Centre Party	20,945	0.05	0	New
Nation Party	17,473	0.04	0	0
Communist Party	13,780	0.03	0	New
Homeland Party	9,289	0.02	0	New
Rights and Justice Party	5,711	0.01	0	New
Independents	488,226	1.06	0	–35
Total	46,163,243	100.00	550	0
Valid votes	46,163,243	97.17		
Invalid/blank votes	1,344,224	2.83		
Total votes	47,507,467	100.00		
Registered voters/turnout	56,608,817	83.92		
Source: YSK

=== By electoral district ===

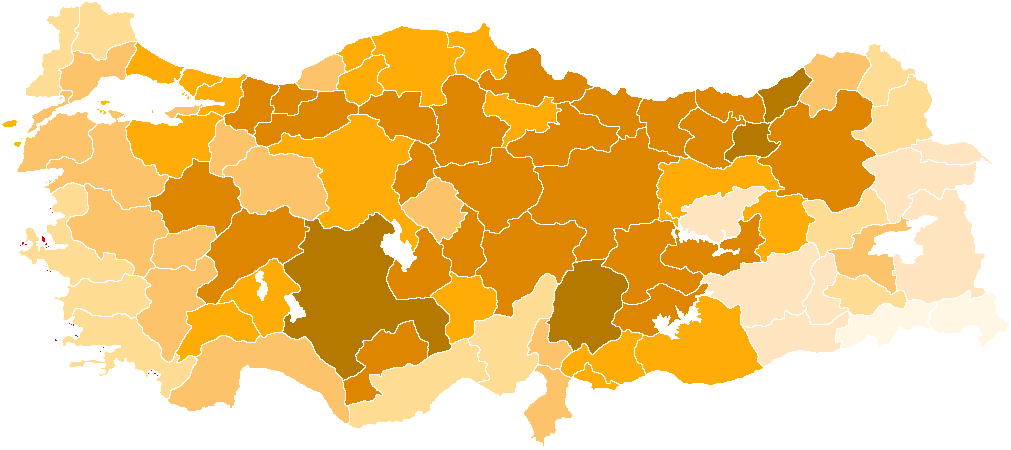
Results obtained by the Justice and Development Party by province. 0–10% 10–20% 20–30% 30–40% 40–50% 50–60% 60–70%

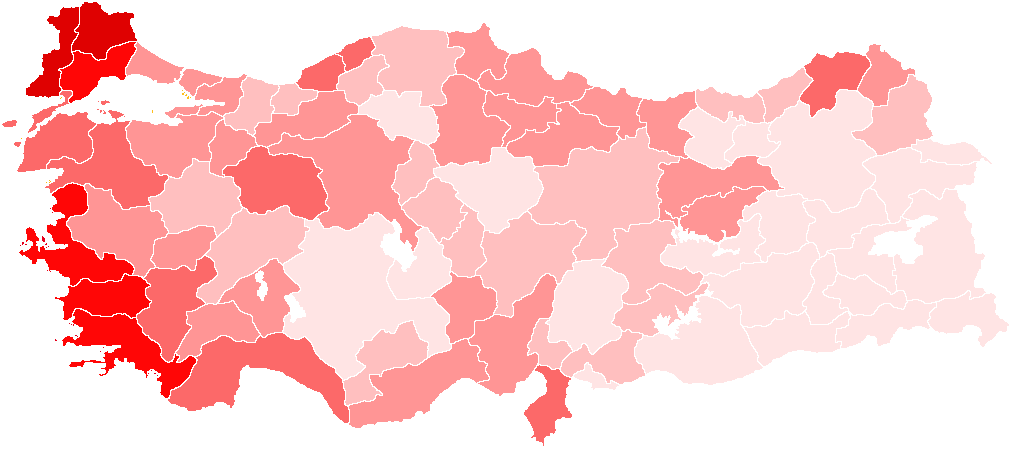
Results obtained by the Republican People's Party by province. 0–10% 10–20% 20–30% 30–40% 40–50% 50–60%

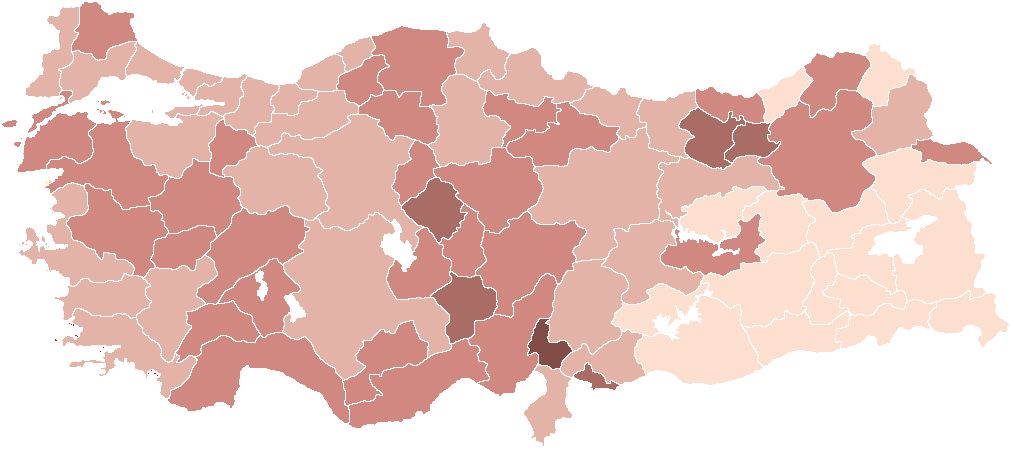
Results obtained by the Nationalist Movement Party by province. 0–10% 10–20% 20–30% 30–40% 40–50%

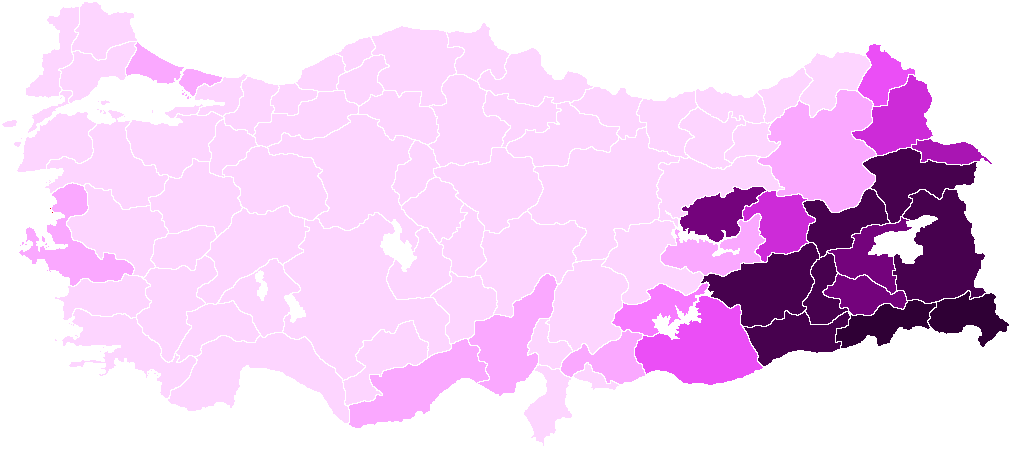
Results obtained by the Peoples' Democratic Party by province. 0–10% 10–20% 20–30% 30–40% 40–50% 50–60% 60–70% 70–80% 80–90%

The following tables show the number of MPs won by each party in each of the 85 electoral districts of Turkey.

Province	AKP	CHP	MHP	HDP	Total
Adana	5	4	3	2	14
Adıyaman	4			1	5
Afyonkarahisar	3	1	1		5
Ağrı				4	4
Aksaray	2		1		3
Amasya	2	1			3
Ankara (I)	7	7	3	1	18
Ankara (II)	8	4	2		14
Ankara total	15	11	5	1	32
Antalya	5	5	3	1	14
Ardahan	1			1	2
Artvin	1	1			2
Aydın	2	4	1		7
Balıkesir	3	3	2		8
Bartın	1	1			2
Batman	1			3	4
Bayburt	1		1		2
Bilecik	1	1			2
Bingöl	2			1	3
Bitlis	1			2	3
Bolu	2	1			3
Burdur	1	1	1		3
Bursa	9	5	3	1	18
Çanakkale	1	2	1		4
Çankırı	2				2
Çorum	3	1			4
Denizli	3	3	1		7
Diyarbakır	1			10	11
Düzce	3				3
Edirne	1	2			3

Province	AKP	CHP	MHP	HDP	Total
Elazığ	3		1		4
Erzincan	1	1			2
Erzurum	4		1	1	6
Eskişehir	2	3	1		6
Gaziantep	6	2	2	2	12
Giresun	2	1	1		4
Gümüşhane	1		1		2
Hakkâri				3	3
Hatay	5	4	1		10
Iğdır				2	2
Isparta	2	1	1		4
Istanbul (I)	14	11	3	3	31
Istanbul (II)	12	8	3	3	26
Istanbul (III)	13	9	4	5	31
Istanbul total	39	28	10	11	88
İzmir (I)	4	6	2	1	13
İzmir (II)	4	6	2	1	13
İzmir total	8	12	4	2	26
Kahramanmaraş	6		2		8
Karabük	1		1		2
Karaman	2				2
Kars	1			2	3
Kastamonu	2		1		3
Kayseri	5	1	3		9
Kırıkkale	2		1		3
Kırklareli	1	2			3
Kırşehir	1		1		2
Kilis	1		1		2
Kocaeli	6	3	1	1	11
Konya	11	1	2		14

Province	AKP	CHP	MHP	HDP	Total
Kütahya	3		1		4
Malatya	5	1			6
Manisa	4	3	2		9
Mardin	1			5	6
Mersin	3	3	3	2	11
Muğla	2	3	1		6
Muş	1			2	3
Nevşehir	2		1		3
Niğde	2		1		3
Ordu	3	2			5
Osmaniye	2		2		4
Rize	3				3
Sakarya	5	1	1		7
Samsun	5	2	2		9
Siirt	1			2	3
Sinop	1	1			2
Sivas	3	1	1		5
Şanlıurfa	7			5	12
Şırnak				4	4
Tekirdağ	2	3	1		6
Tokat	3	1	1		5
Trabzon	4	1	1		6
Tunceli				2	2
Uşak	1	1	1		3
Van	1			7	8
Yalova	1	1			2
Yozgat	3		1		4
Zonguldak	2	2	1		5
Turkey total	258	132	80	80	550

=== Overseas results ===
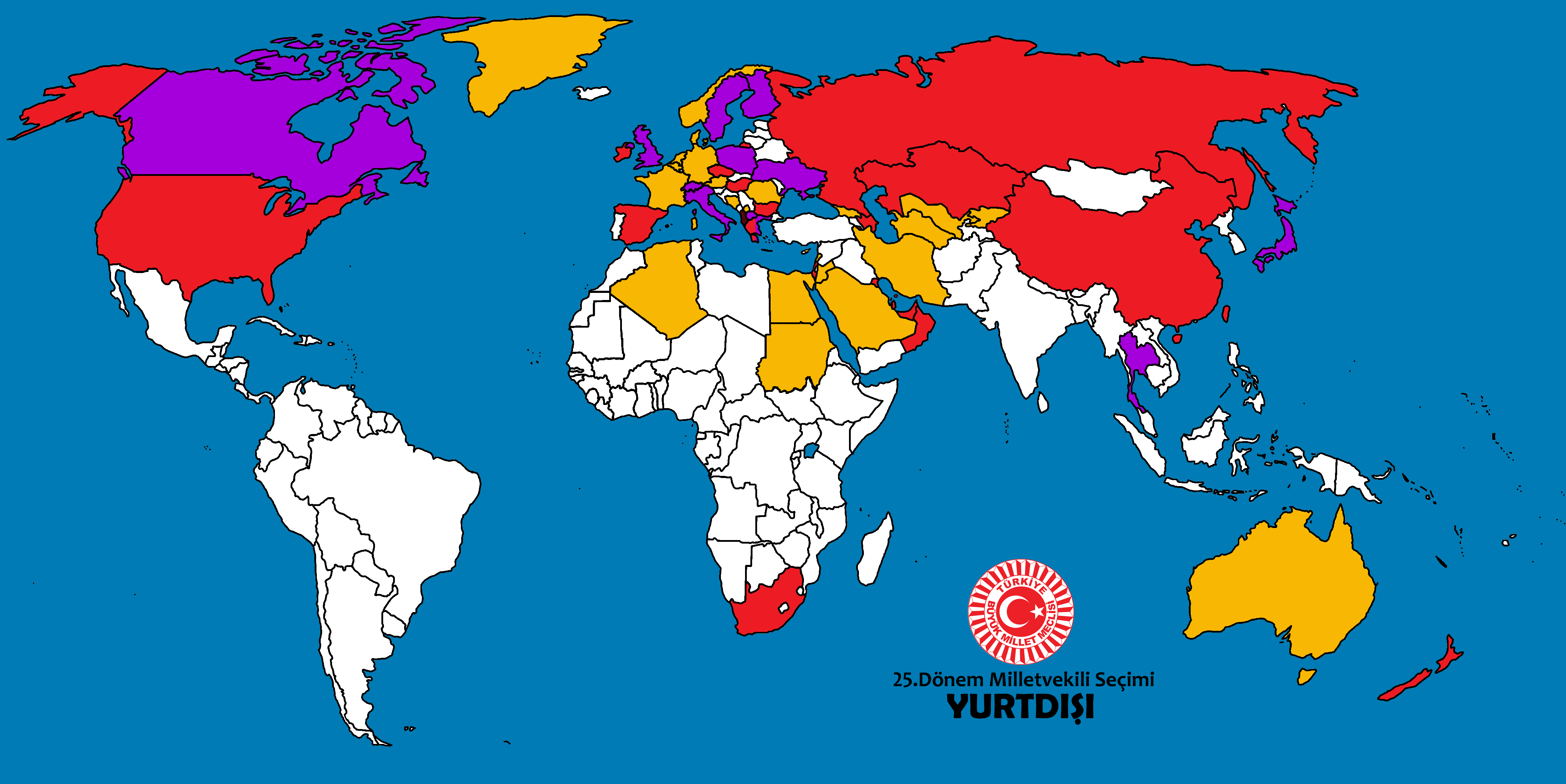
Winners according to countries, with ties shown in black

Overseas vote share
AKP	50.37%
HDP	21.43%
CHP	15.93%
MHP	9.09%
Others	3.18%

This was the second election, after the 2014 presidential election, in which Turkish expats were given the right to vote. Furthermore, votes were also cast 38 customs gates in airports, ports and border gates around the country. In an overseas vote period lasting 23 days between 8 May and 31 May 2015, the turnout was significantly higher than that in the presidential election, reaching 37% as opposed to the 8% recorded in 2014.

Out of the 54 countries where expats were given the vote, the Justice and Development Party (AKP) won the most votes in 23 countries. The Republican People's Party (CHP) won the most votes in 18 countries. The Peoples' Democratic Party (HDP) won the most votes in 11 countries and the Nationalist Movement Party (MHP) managed to win the most votes in only one country, namely Albania.

The overseas vote, which had been won by AKP candidate Recep Tayyip Erdoğan with over 62.3% in the 2014 presidential election, showed a significant swing of around 10% from the AKP to the HDP, which increased its overseas vote share from 9.8% (that their candidate Selahattin Demirtaş won in 2014) to over 20%. The AKP, on the other hand, won just over 50%, coming first due to strong support from countries with a significant Turkish expat population, such as Germany and Austria.

The following table shows the winners according to countries in which Turkish consulates held voting periods for the election.

Country	Party
Albania	MHP
Algeria	AKP
Australia	AKP
Austria	AKP
Azerbaijan	CHP
Bahrain	CHP
Belgium	AKP
Bosnia	AKP
Bulgaria	CHP

Country	Party
Canada	HDP
China	CHP
Czech Republic	CHP
Denmark	AKP
Egypt	AKP
Finland	HDP
France	AKP
Georgia	AKP
Germany	AKP

Country	Party
Greece	TIE*
Hungary	CHP
Iran	AKP
Ireland	CHP
Israel	CHP
Italy	HDP
Japan	HDP
Jordan	AKP
Kazakhstan	CHP

Country	Party
Kosovo	AKP
Kuwait	CHP
Kyrgyzstan	AKP
Lebanon	AKP
Macedonia	HDP
Netherlands	AKP
New Zealand	CHP
Northern Cyprus	AKP
Norway	AKP

Country	Party
Oman	CHP
Poland	HDP
Qatar	CHP
Romania	AKP
Russia	CHP
Saudi Arabia	AKP
South Africa	CHP
Spain	CHP
Sudan	AKP

Country	Party
Sweden	HDP
Switzerland	HDP
Thailand	HDP
Turkmenistan	AKP
Ukraine	HDP
United Arab Emirates	CHP
United Kingdom	HDP
United States	CHP
Uzbekistan	AKP

* In Greece, the HDP and CHP each received 174 votes (29.4%) and came joint first.

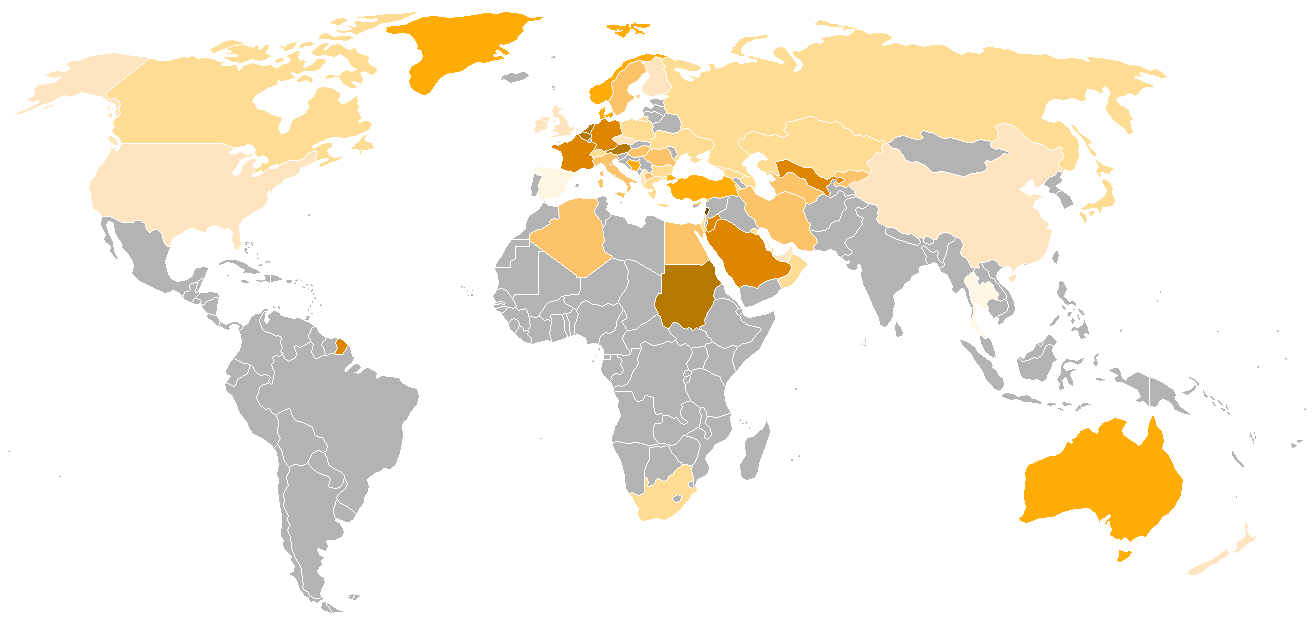
Results obtained by the Justice and Development Party by country. 0–10% 10–20% 20–30% 30–40% 40–50% 50–60% 60–70% 70–80% 80–90%

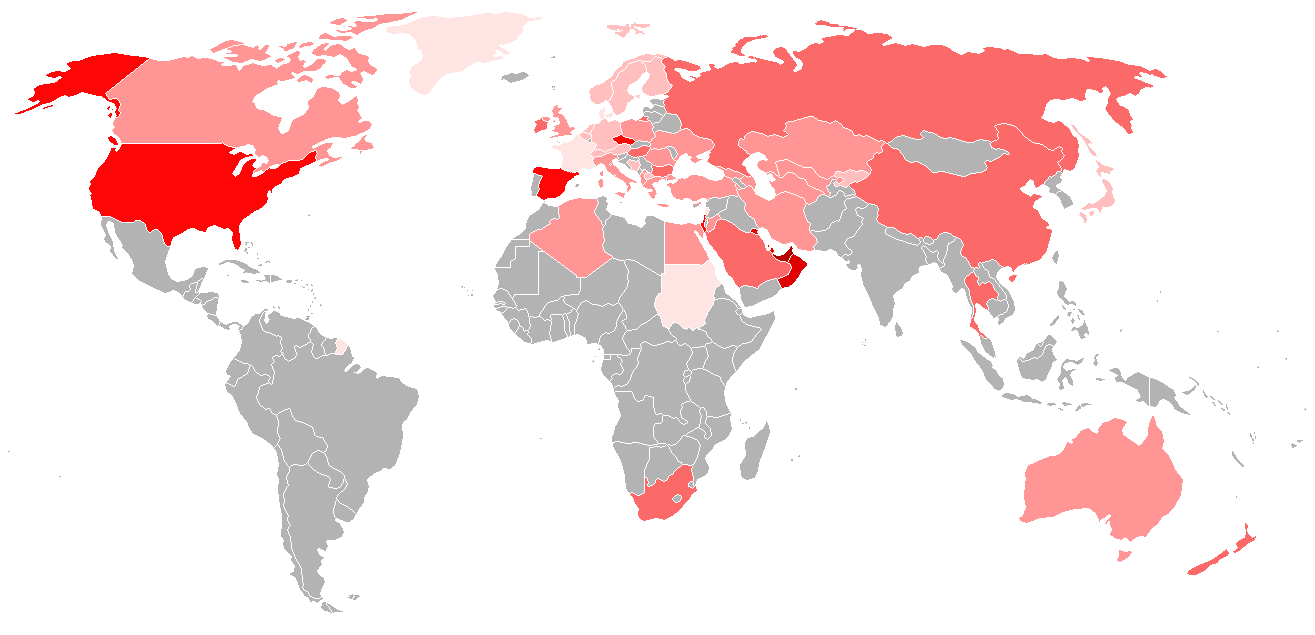
Results obtained by the Republican People's Party by country. 0–10% 10–20% 20–30% 30–40% 40–50% 50–60% 60–70%

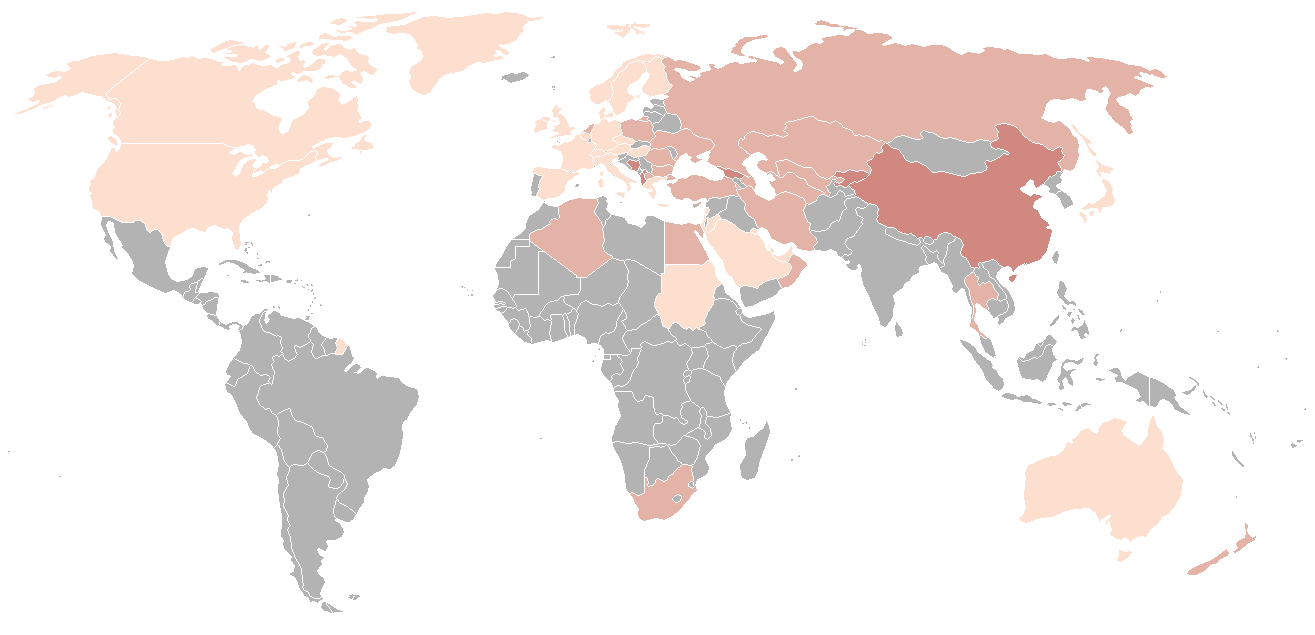
Results obtained by the Nationalist Movement Party by country. 0–10% 10–20% 20–30% 30–40%

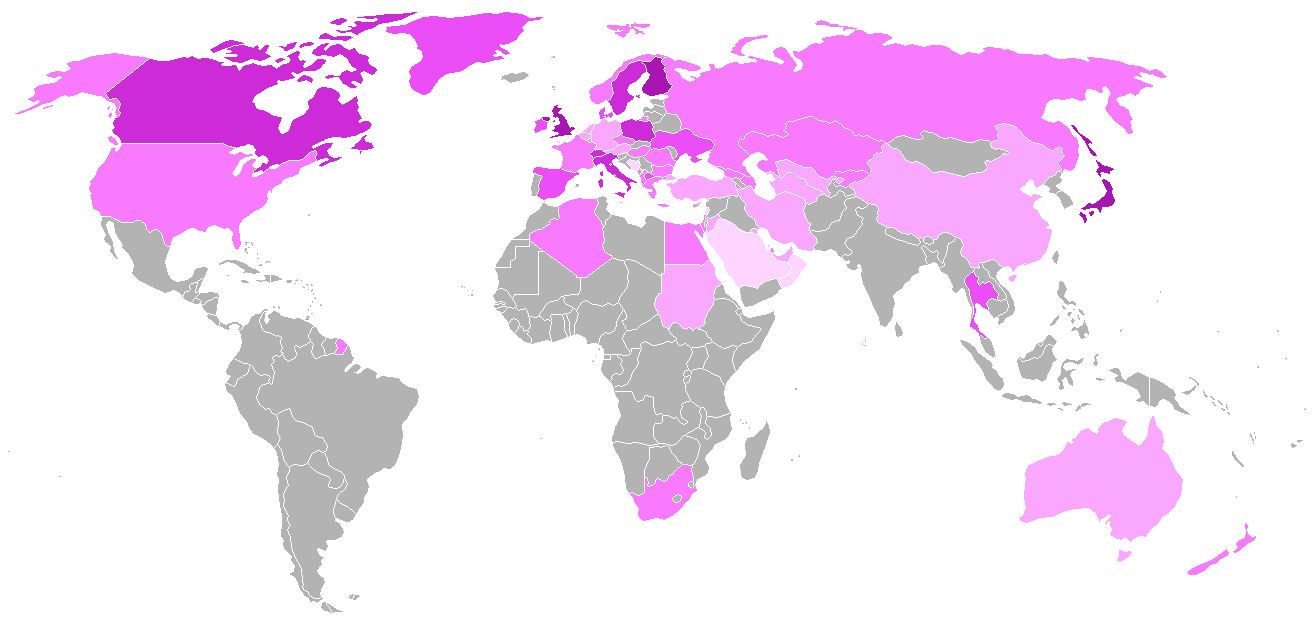
Results obtained by the Peoples' Democratic Party by country. 0–10% 10–20% 20–30% 30–40% 40–50% 50–60%

==== Seats changing hands after overseas results ====
The proportional allocation of overseas votes to the results of individual electoral districts resulted in three seats changing hands. Two of these were lost by the MHP while the other was lost by the CHP. Of these three seats, two were won by the AKP while the third was won by the HDP.

District	Seat before		Seat after	
District	Party	Lost by	Party	Won by
Amasya	MHP	Mehmet Sarı	AKP	Sait Yüce
İzmir (II)	CHP	Ali Engin	AKP	Kerem Ali Sürekli
Kocaeli	MHP	Lütfü Türkkan	HDP	Ali Haydar Konca

Party	seats before allocation	overseas vote %	seats after allocation	change
AKP	256	50.37	258	▲2
CHP	133	15.93	132	▼1
MHP	82	9.09	80	▼2
HDP	79	21.43	80	▲1

=== Parliamentary composition ===
The state of the outgoing parliament before the election

The state of the incoming parliament after the election

The following table reflects the composition of the 24th parliament elected in 2011, the composition of the 24th parliament at dissolution and the composition of the elected 25th parliament.

Party		24th Parliament (28 June 2011 – 23 June 2015)			25th Parliament (23 June 2015 – )
Party		2011 vote %	Elected	At dissolution	Elected
AKP	Justice and Development Party	49.83	327 / 550	311 / 550	258 / 550
CHP	Republican People's Party	25.98	135 / 550	125 / 550	132 / 550
MHP	Nationalist Movement Party	13.01	53 / 550	52 / 550	80 / 550
	Independents	6.57	35 / 550	13 / 550	0 / 550
HDP	Peoples' Democratic Party	New Party		29 / 550	80 / 550
DBP	Democratic Regions Party*	Contested as independents		1 / 550	Did not contest
ANAPAR	Anatolia Party	New Party		1 / 550	0 / 550
eP	Electronic Democracy Party	New Party		1 / 550	Did not contest
MEP	Centre Party	New Party		1 / 550	0 / 550
Total		95.39	550	535^	550
* The Democratic Regions Party was known as the Peace and Democracy Party (BDP) in 2011 and fielded candidates as independents to bypass the 10% threshold. The Peoples' Democratic Party (HDP) will contest the 2015 general election on their behalf.^15 seats have been vacated during the 24th Parliament (4 deaths, 10 elected mayors, 1 elected president).

=== Complaints and recounts ===
Parties had until 17:00 on 17 June to submit complaints and requests for recounts regarding any violation of electoral law. The MHP submitted a formal complaint to the Supreme Electoral Council after losing a seat in Kocaeli, while the AKP submitted numerous complaints in the south-east where the party lost heavily to the HDP. Most of these complaints were in regards to the HDP's controversial campaigning tactics, which many critics accused were built on scaremongering and fear with involvement from the PKK terrorist organisation. The HDP also submitted complaints in Elazığ and Muş, alleging ballot paper theft.

On 16 June, the Electoral Council rejected the AKP's complaints in Diyarbakır, Van, and Giresun, as well as the HDP's complaint in Elazığ.

== Aftermath ==
The Supreme Electoral Council of Turkey announced the fully confirmed results on 18 June 2015. The 25th Parliament of Turkey was sworn in on 23 June 2015, chaired temporarily by the new parliament's oldest member Deniz Baykal. The first two rounds of the elections for Parliamentary Speaker will be held on 30 June, while the last two on 1 July 2015. The elected Speaker will be announced on 3 July at the latest. Turkish Defense Minister İsmet Yılmaz of the Justice and Development Party (AKP) was elected the country's new parliamentary speaker in the fourth round and with the covert support of the Nationalist Movement Party (MHP) on 1 July in a sign of possible coming coalition between the two.

=== Government reactions ===
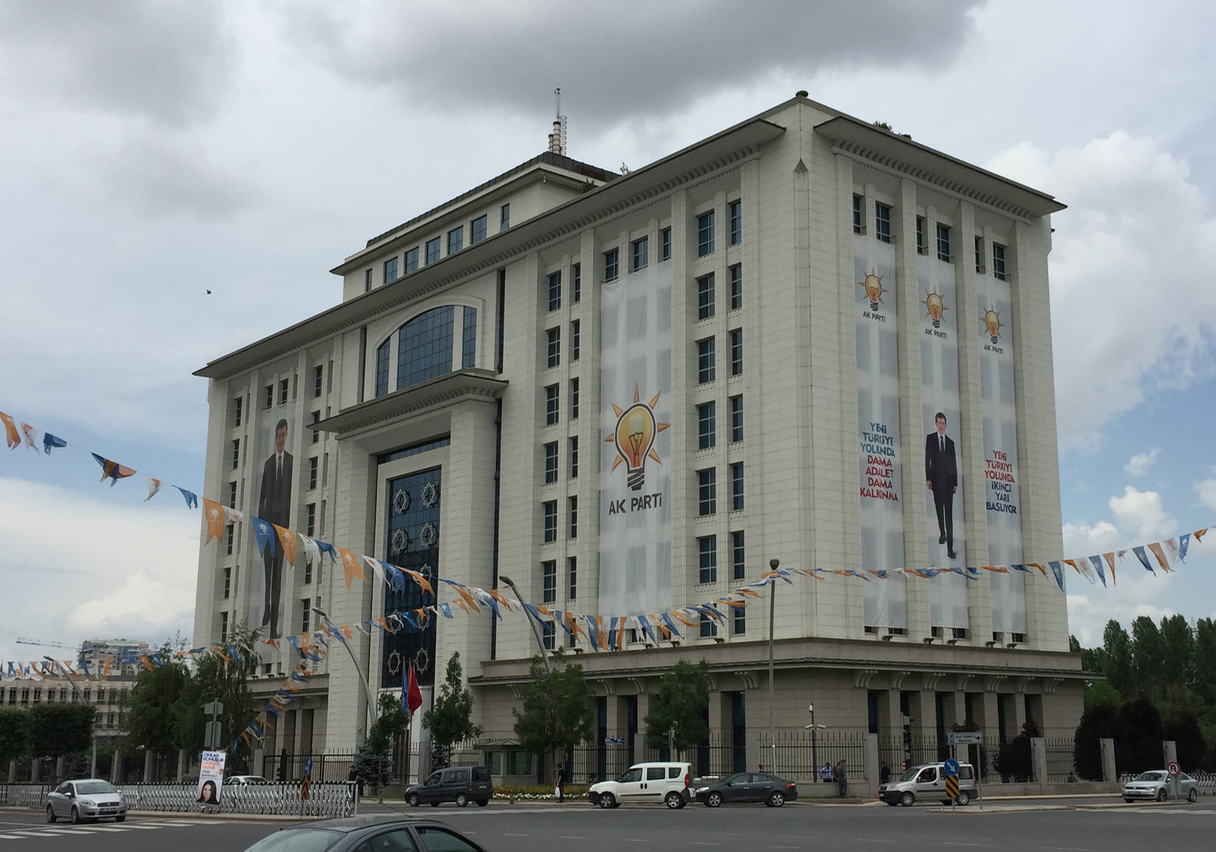
AKP headquarters in Ankara, draped in party flags featuring leader Ahmet Davutoğlu in preparation for the general election

Despite winning over 40% of the vote, the AKP and President Recep Tayyip Erdoğan were largely seen as the biggest losers of the election. Erdoğan's ambitions for an executive presidential republic (which would give him substantially greater powers as a result) was deemed to have been unanimously rejected by the electorate according to the CHP and the HDP. With HDP co-leader Selahattin Demirtaş stating that the election results had put an end to the debate over a presidential system, Erdoğan's controversial economic advisor Yiğit Bulut claimed that the results showed support for an executive presidency. Erdoğan was also regarded as a significant loser of the election due to his extensive campaigning efforts for the AKP in the run-up to the vote, under the guise of 'public opening rallies'. Erdoğan's implicit participation in the AKP's campaign made him as accountable as the party's leader Ahmet Davutoğlu for the loss of their majority, according to many politicians and media commentators.

With the vote counting process underway and the AKP being projected to have lost their majority, Ahmet Davutoğlu appeared to accept the result and stated that the decision of the voters was the best decision. Amid speculation over whether Davutoğlu would make a victory speech, Davutoğlu confirmed his intention to do so by travelling from his hometown of Konya to the AKP headquarters in Ankara, delivering a victory speech on the building's balcony. He claimed that the AKP would continue in delivering its programme and claimed that the AKP had won the election by virtue of winning the most votes. Davutoğlu's decision to give a victory speech was widely mocked on social media due to his lack of a parliamentary majority, with many commentators putting the speech down as being made for raising the morale of AKP activists. On 9 June, Davutoğlu and his government resigned out of protocol, with President Erdoğan accepting his resignation and requesting him to stay on as prime minister until a new government had been formed.

President Erdoğan also made a written statement, stating that the voters' decision could not be argued against and that all parties needed to show responsibility and sensitivity in the government forming process. His statement was seen as a sharp contrast to his perceivably polarising and partisan speeches made during the election campaign. Erdoğan's absence from the public gaze after the election, which was seen as a contrast to his frequent appearances on news channels and public rallies before the election, was also mocked.

On 10 June, Erdoğan met former CHP leader Deniz Baykal, who was the eldest MP of the newly elected Parliament. As the eldest MP, Baykal would serve as the temporary Speaker of the Grand National Assembly until a Speaker could be elected. This raised speculation that Erdoğan was preparing to hand over the Presidency to Baykal, who would become interim President (as Speaker) should Erdoğan relinquish his post.

=== Opposition reactions ===
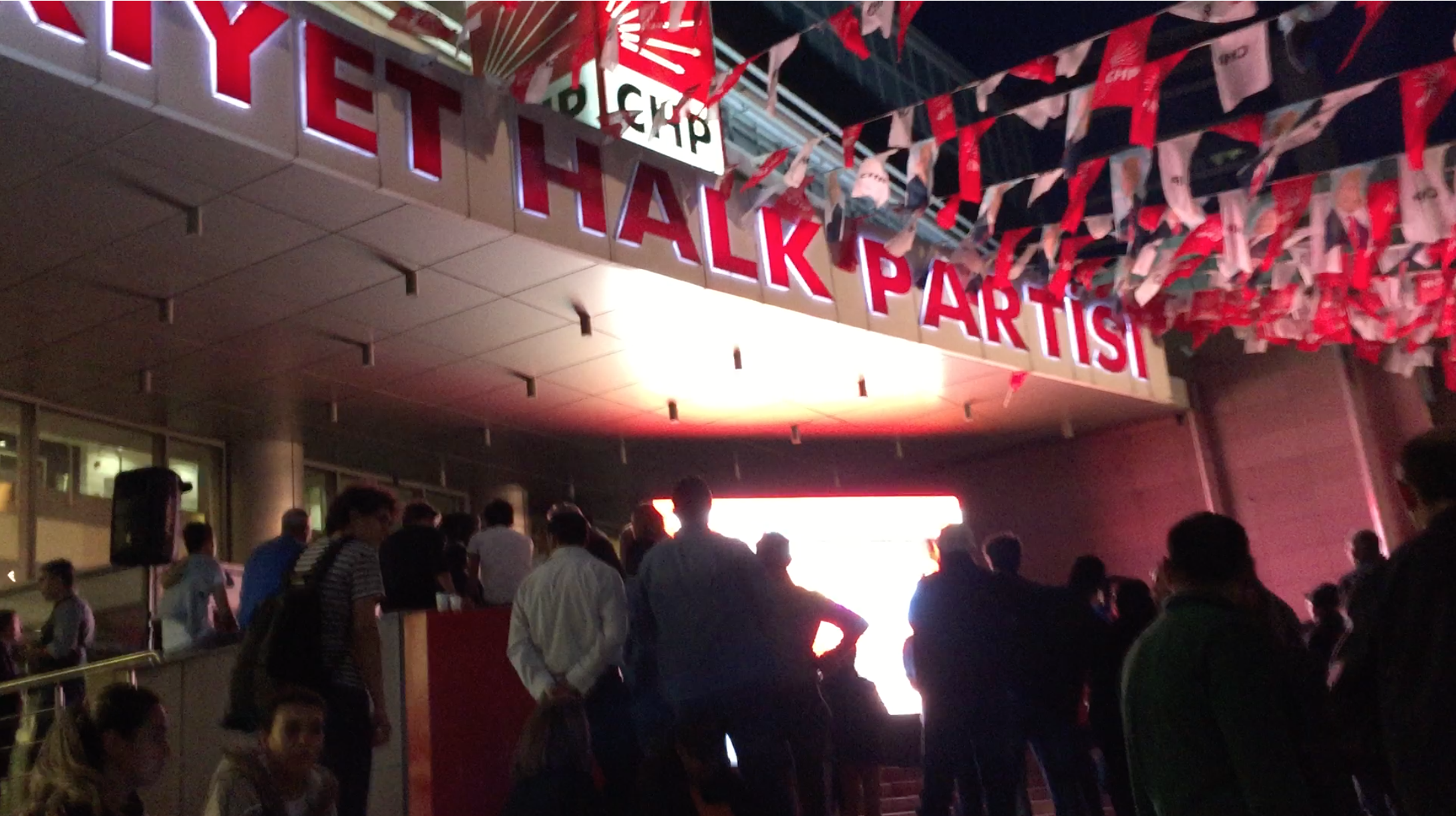
CHP supporters watching the election results live at the CHP headquarters in Ankara

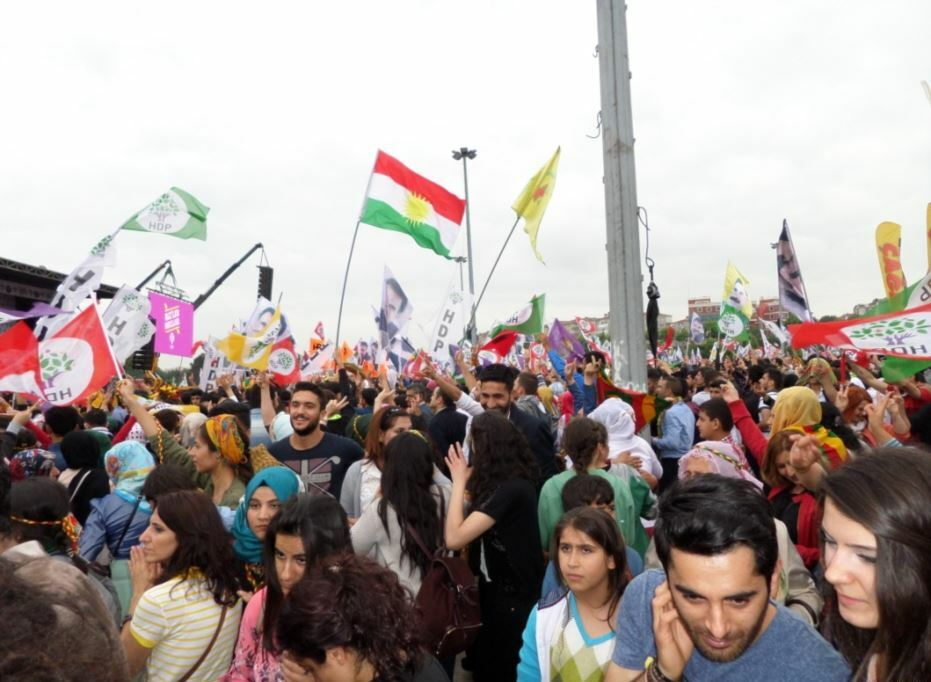
HDP supporters celebrating their election result in Istanbul, 8 June 2015

The election results were largely perceived to be a surprise for the opposition, with the HDP having surpassed the election threshold by a healthy 3% of the vote despite many pollsters claiming that it was hovering at the 10% boundary. HDP co-leader Selahattin Demirtaş was widely seen as the victor of the election, in the sense that as well as exceeding many vote share projections, his party won the same amount of MPs (80 seats) as the Nationalist Movement Party. The international press characterised Demirtaş as the 'Kurdish Obama' and supporters of the HDP took to the street to celebrate their success on the evening of polling day. HDP MP Sırrı Süreyya Önder also stated that the HDP was aware that many voters voted tactically to ensure that the HDP passed the 10% threshold, claiming that the party would not alienate these voters.

CHP leader Kemal Kılıçdaroğlu, who oversaw a drop of 1% in his party's vote share since the 2011 general election, issued a statement praising democracy for ousting the AKP majority government from power. Despite the CHP claiming that it was because of them that the AKP failed to win a majority, media commentators claimed that the decrease in their vote and seat share showed that it was in fact the HDP and MHP that had more of an effect on the result. CHP spokesperson Haluk Koç stated that the CHP was now in the most likely position to be included in a coalition, with Kılıçdaroğlu allegedly attempting to form a CHP-MHP minority coalition with outside support from the HDP. Kılıçdaroğlu appeared to have refused to consider a coalition with the AKP. In response to a question of whether he would resign after presiding over a decrease in the CHP vote, Kılıçdaroğlu refused to comment but claimed that he was perfectly happy with the election result. Despite this, the president of the Turkish Bars Association and CHP member Metin Feyzioğlu stated that a convention should be called due to the poor election result. The drop in the CHP's vote share was largely attributed to CHP voters tactically voting for the HDP to increase the chances of them surpassing the 10% parliamentary threshold.

The MHP saw both an increase in their seat and vote share, mostly attributed to AKP voters disaffected by the AKP's Solution process with Kurdish rebels. The MHP's leader Devlet Bahçeli categorically ruled out any coalition involving the HDP, claiming that supporters of the solution process (i.e. the AKP, CHP and the HDP) should form a triple coalition together. Bahçeli stated that the MHP was ready to become the main opposition party if such an eventually took place.

Many commentators observed that the reduction of AKP delegates in the state media regulator RTÜK from five out of nine to four out of nine due to the election result meant that the media, often having been accused of being heavily biased in favour of the AKP, could relax due to the erosion of the AKP's monopoly on state institutions.

=== International reactions ===
International reactions were largely subdued by the fact that the election had no clear winner, with the subsequent prime minister not immediately certain at the time the election results were announced.

European Union – Martin Schulz, the President of the European Parliament released a statement calling the election a 'healthy, democratic exercise.' Schulz also claimed that the elections had been free and fair.
Russia – Russian President Vladimir Putin phoned Turkish President Recep Tayyip Erdoğan on the Justice and Development Party's election performance. The call was controversial since Erdoğan as president officially has no affiliation with the AKP, despite having founded and led it between 2001 and 2014 and having been accused of illegally campaigning for the party ahead of the election.

=== Economic implications ===
With a potential period of instability due to the lack of a clear government composition, the Turkish lira fell sharply against the US Dollar and the Euro on 8 June, a day after the election. With the Lira already volatile and trading above ₺2.70 to the dollar before the election, the Lira fell further and at one point reached ₺2.86 to the dollar before recovering. A similar fall was observed with the Euro. However, with a reduction in the AKP's popularity already widely expected before the election, economists argued that the Istanbul Stock Exchange wouldn't experience a substantial period of volatility.

With negotiations between the AKP and CHP failing on 13 August, the lira slumped to ₺2.86. A last-ditch attempt to form a coalition between the AKP and MHP also failed on 17 August, after which the lira fell to ₺2.869 to the dollar, setting a new record. With the Central Bank of Turkey announcing that interest rates would remain at 7.5%, the lira fell even lower to ₺2.88 to the dollar.

=== Post-election violence ===
Deadly clashes broke out in the predominantly Kurdish city of Diyarbakır in south-eastern Turkey after Aytaç Baran, the head of the Yeni Ihya Der charity, was shot dead as he left his office. Baran's close links with the Kurdish Islamist Free Cause Party (HÜDA-PAR) resulted in violence breaking out between HÜDA-PAR and HDP supporters, with three other people being killed in the ensuring clashes. The relations between HÜDA-PAR, which ran as independent candidates to bypass the election threshold but failed to get any MPs elected, and the HDP are historically tense. Both parties appealed for calm and the HDP strongly condemned the attack on Aytaç Baran. After 3 HDP members were killed in the ensuring violence, 7 HÜDA-PAR members were arrested but were freed after questioning.

=== Government formation ===
In July 2015 HDP was open to coalition with unwilling AKP, but in September it rejected the prospect of that coalition. MHP have rejected possibility of joining a coalition involving the HDP. As a result, a coalition not involving the AKP is not a possible scenario. In a last-ditch attempt to form a CHP-MHP coalition with outside support from the HDP, CHP leader Kemal Kılıçdaroğlu offered MHP leader Devlet Bahçeli the post of Prime Minister of Turkey in such a coalition. Bahçeli criticised the offer, calling the CHP a 'seat supplier'.

The CHP and MHP both initially refused to join a coalition with the AKP, but later indicated interest in entering negotiations. An AKP-CHP coalition was seen as one of the most likely scenarios. An AKP-MHP coalition was also seen as likely due to ideological similarities, though the two parties differ strongly on the issue of the Kurdish peace process. The MHP set out its red lines for any coalition deal to be the end of any discussion of a presidential system, the end of the solution process, the safeguarding of Turkish identity in any new constitutional settlement and the re-opening of suppressed corruption cases. The party's leader Devlet Bahçeli also demanded that Erdoğan should either resign or strictly keep to the constitutional limits of his position as president. In contrast, the AKP initially put forward three non-compromisable conditions on any coalition, which include the continuation of the solution process, the continuation of the government's efforts to purge the political power of the Gülen Movement and the refusal to compromise on Recep Tayyip Erdoğan's conduct as president. On 11 June, the AKP appeared to backtrack on their support for an executive presidency, with leader Ahmet Davutoğlu stating that he was not against the current parliamentary system. Davutoğlu also claimed that the AKP did not have any non-negotiable conditions for a coalition despite earlier contradictory reports.

Erdoğan formally tasked Davutoğlu with forming a new government on 9 July, with the Constitution granting Davutoğlu 45 days (until 23 August) to form a new government. The first round of coalition talks involved discussions between the AKP with the CHP, MHP and HDP, after which the AKP announced that they would no longer pursue any negotiations with the HDP. The second round of negotiations mainly focused on the CHP, while the MHP declared their support for an early election and closed their doors on any form of deal soon after. Negotiations between the AKP and CHP continued into August, lasting collectively over 35 hours. The CHP unveiled 14 principles upon which a coalition government involving them would stick to, involving many of their manifesto pledges. The MHP later backtracked on their support for an early election and supported the formation of an AKP-CHP government. On 13 August 2015, the leaders of the AKP and CHP met for a final time in a meeting that had been perceived to be where a final decision would be made on whether to form a coalition government. The meeting ended after the AKP proposed a three-month interim government followed by fresh elections, despite the CHP's insistence that the government should last four years.

The breakdown of coalition negotiations between the AKP and the CHP, as well as the MHP's scepticism of forming a coalition government resulted in Davutoğlu stating that an early election was the only option, though he requested a final meeting with MHP leader Devlet Bahçeli. With a spate of terrorist attacks by the Kurdistan Workers' Party (PKK) and the Islamic State of Iraq and the Levant (ISIL) on Turkish soil in response to the government's Operation Martyr Yalçın, Bahçeli ended his support for an early election claiming that it was not possible during such circumstances. He set out four new unconditional terms for a coalition, which were the complete end to discussions over changing the first four articles of the Turkish Constitution, the ending of the Solution process, a limit on Recep Tayyip Erdoğan's powers within a parliamentary system with checks and balances restored as well as the re-opening of the suppressed corruption investigations into four former AKP government ministers. The negotiations, held on 17 August, broke down, effectively ending all prospects for a coalition government. Davutoğlu stated that he would subsequently relinquish the task of forming a new government.

It has been widely reported during the coalition negotiations that the AKP heavily favours going into an early election, with President Recep Tayyip Erdoğan also being reported to have been heavily sceptical of a coalition government. Proponents of an early election also included the leader of the AKP coalition negotiation team Ömer Çelik, whom Davutoğlu allegedly tried to remove from his role in the negotiations but failed due to Çelik's close relations with President Erdoğan.

New elections have now been called for 1 November.

Declined post-election scenarios are:

- A minority AKP government
- A grand coalition between the AKP and the CHP (negotiations broke down)
- A coalition between the AKP and the HDP (rejected by HDP)
- A coalition between the AKP and the MHP (initially rejected, last-minute negotiations broke down)
- A minority coalition between the CHP and the MHP, with outside support from the HDP (rejected by MHP)
- A minority CHP government backed by the MHP and the HDP (rejected by MHP).
