= Issues and developments during the 2015 Turkish general elections =

The following article documents the issues and developments that have formed the basis of the political campaigns and the news agenda in the run-up to the June 2015 general election and the November 2015 general election.

== Civil liberties ==
The election was held at a time when Turkey's human rights record was facing increased domestic and international scrutiny, particularly from the European Union. The AKP's commitment to human rights has thus also come under doubt, with the governments of Recep Tayyip Erdoğan and Ahmet Davutoğlu both presiding over controversial curbs on civil liberties since 2011. Following proposals to limit rights to protest after the Autumn 2014 Kurdish riots, critics accused the government of turning Turkey into a police state. A long-time ban against headscarves in the civil service was abolished in 2013.

A spate of anti-government demonstrations began in May 2013 and continued throughout the year, protesting against Erdoğan's alleged authoritarianism, police brutality, and media censorship. The government responded with what many critics called disproportionate force that claimed the lives of 22 people and injured over 8,000. Images of police using slingshots against protestors, the use of dangerous chemicals in water cannon spray and tear gas, as well as the involvement of many club-carrying AKP youth wing members assisting the police, drew particular outrage. Erdoğan responded by calling the protesters 'looters' and refused to resign as Prime Minister.

Beginning in 2013, critics accused media outlets of being under government control, and CHP claimed that the AKP were the 'biggest media boss in Turkey'. A CHP party report claimed that 1,863 journalists had been fired since the beginning of AKP rule. Turkey ranks first in the world in terms of imprisoned journalists, with 40 in prison according to the committee to Protect Journalists. A new Internet law passed in 2013 has also allowed the government to block websites without court order, which was implemented in March 2014 with the banning of both Twitter and YouTube.

In February 2015, a 13-year-old boy was arrested after allegedly criticizing President Erdoğan on Facebook. In March, a Patriotic Party youth leader was arrested for calling Erdoğan a dictator, with the prosecution requesting a prison sentence of one year and two months. Three more Twitter users were taken into custody for allegedly insulting the President and other senior government officials on 13 March.

== Economy ==
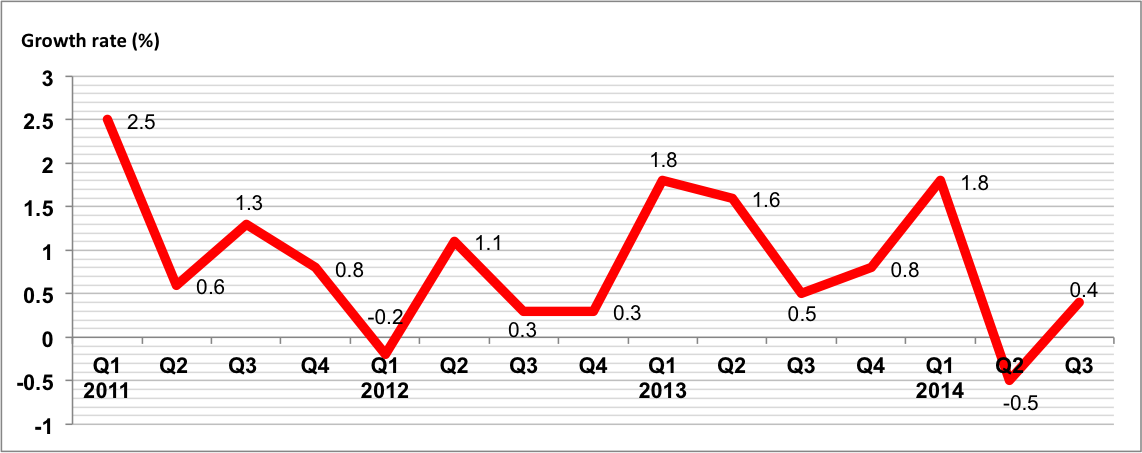
Economic growth rate in Turkey between 2011 and 2014

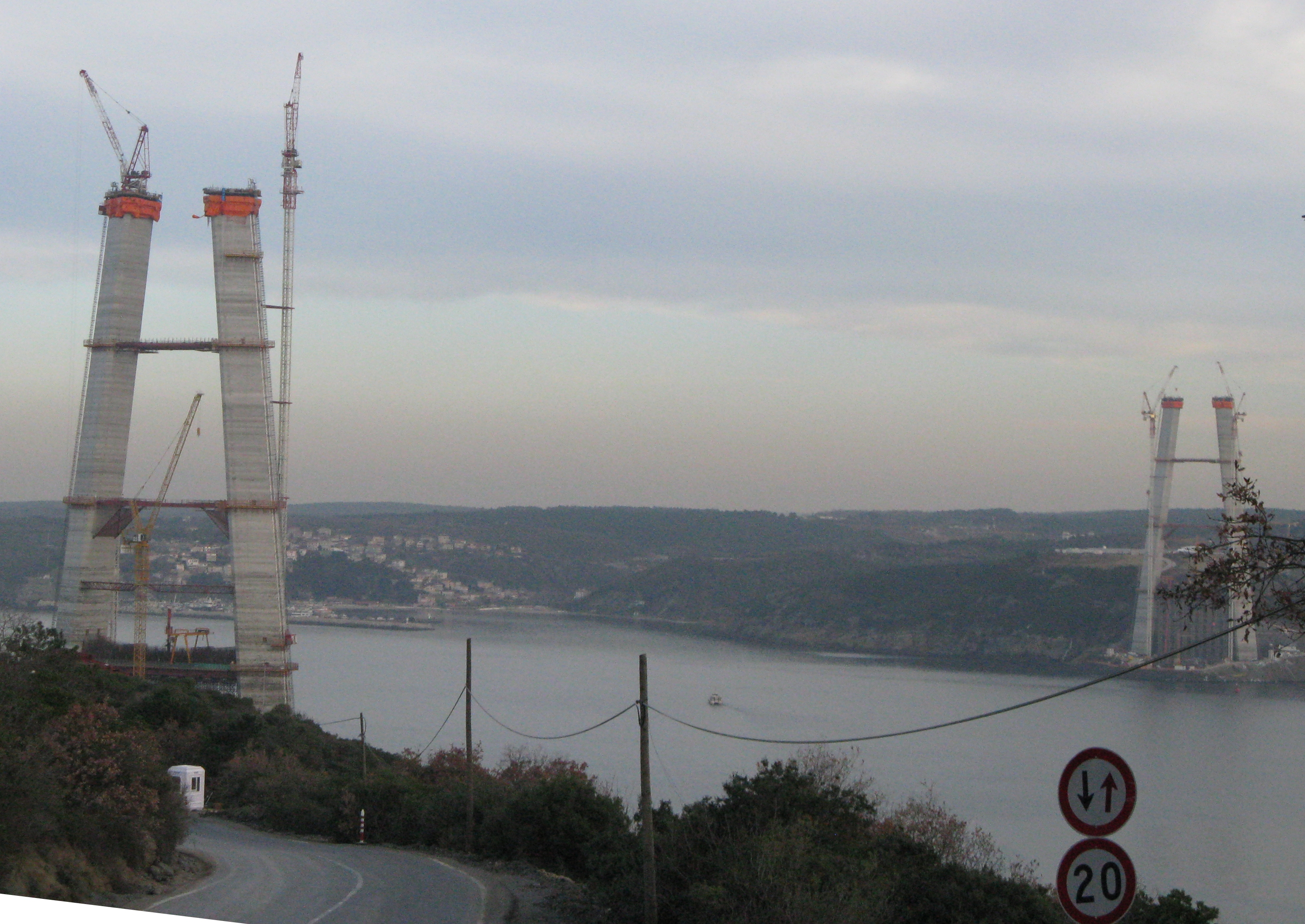

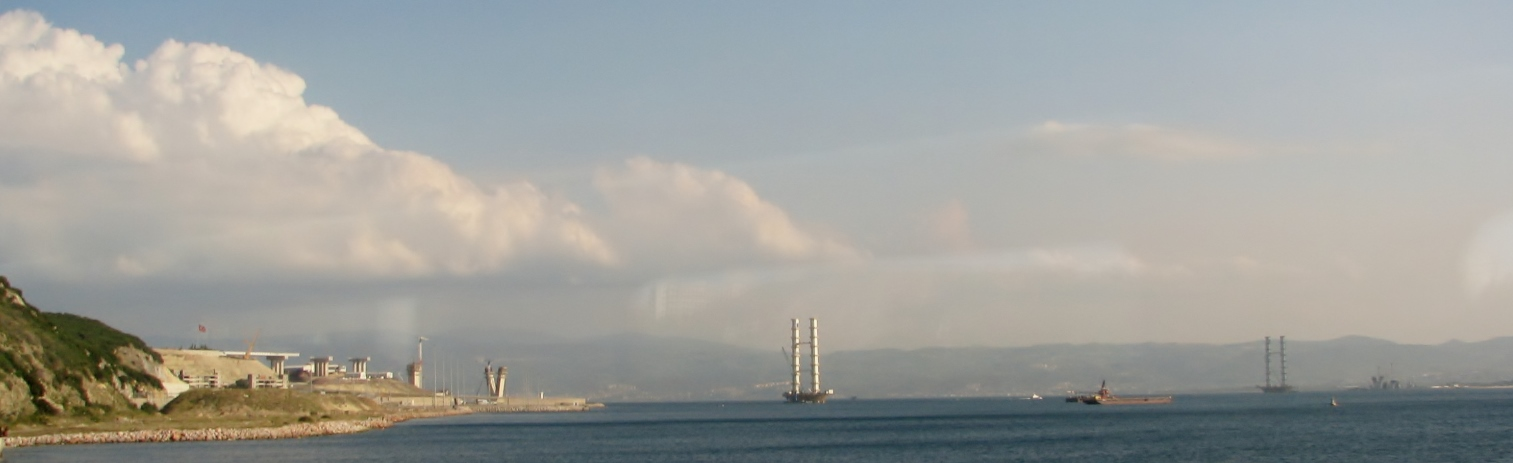
The Yavuz Sultan Selim Bridge (top) and the İzmit Bay Bridge (bottom), under construction, have featured heavily in the AKP's campaign

Although Turkey boasted a period of strong economic growth after the 2008 financial crisis, several forecasts for the future have been downgraded due to political turmoil and a lack of structural reforms. Economists, as well as former AKP Prime Minister and President Abdullah Gül have stressed the need for Turkey to adopt a new economic model, potentially becoming an export-led economy. In early 2015, the official unemployment rate rose above 10% for the first time in years while youth unemployment rose above 20%. The economic downturn has been attributed to Turkey's over-reliance on foreign investment to sustain growth. 20% of Turks live below the poverty line while child poverty has risen to 63.5%. Furthermore, political uncertainty has resulted in sharp falls in the Istanbul stock exchange. Regardless, the AKP government have continued investment in major infrastructure, such as the Yavuz Sultan Selim Bridge, the Ankara-Istanbul high-speed railway, the İzmit Bay Bridge currently under construction as well as the M5 metro line in Istanbul.

Pre-election giveaways have since included a government pledge to grant subsidies to first-time home buyers, contributing 15% of their savings to the purchase of their first home.

== Foreign policy ==
The three main parties contesting the election broadly associate themselves with significantly different outlooks on foreign policy. These are the Muslim Brotherhood-inspired Pan-Islamist or Neo-Ottoman foreign policy of the AKP, the western-orientated foreign policy of national autonomy advocated by the CHP, the Kurdish nationalist foreign policy advocated by the HDP and the pan-Turkist policy of expansionism promoted by the MHP. As the architect of the AKP's foreign policy outlook while serving as Foreign Minister, Ahmet Davutoğlu was initially praised for redefining Turkey's international role as a regional power. During the latter years of his tenure, he has been criticized for his policy failures regarding the Syrian Civil War and the Islamic State of Iraq and the Levant (ISIS).

The elections came at a time when Turkey was increasingly isolated in the international sphere due to the AKP's insistence that Bashar al-Assad be as President of Syria before giving support to the United States during their airstrikes against ISIS. In the 2014 UN Security council elections, Turkey lost a seat to Spain, which was seen as a sign of global disapproval against the AKP's foreign policy. As a result, the opposition widely criticised the AKP's foreign policy, claiming that it had caused growing problems with neighbours as opposed to 'zero problems with neighbours' that Davutoğlu initially hoped to achieve as Foreign Minister.

Particular foreign policy conflicts between parties have centered on the issue of Israel and the European Union. Both the AKP and CHP blamed each other for being pro-Israel, with the former accusing the latter of being associated with 'pro-Israel' Islamic cleric Fethullah Gülen. The CHP has accused the AKP of increasing their business relations with Israel despite their strong anti-Israeli rhetoric. While Davutoğlu claimed that EU membership was a strategic target for his government, stalled accession talks prompted President Recep Tayyip Erdoğan to declare that the EU 'should mind their own business' after they condemned the mass arrest of journalists in late 2014.

== Government corruption scandal ==
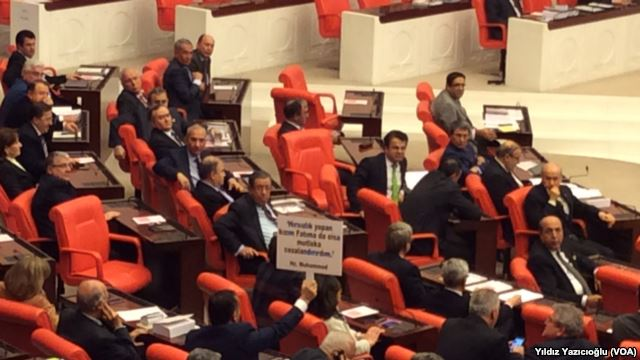
CHP Members of Parliament protesting against AKP ministers voting against their conviction, January 2015

The AKP's election campaign revolved around dismantling the 'parallel state' that it accuses Fethullah Gülen of using to incriminate the government in a 2013 corruption scandal. After parliament rejected an opposition-backed motion to send AKP former ministers Zafer Çağlayan, Muammer Güler, Egemen Bağış and Erdoğan Bayraktar to the Supreme Criminal Court (Turkish: Yüce Divan) on corruption charges on 21 January 2015, Ahmet Davutoğlu declared the scandal a coup attempt. Several AKP MPs, such as Hakan Şükür, İdris Bal and İdris Naim Şahin had resigned following the scandal and in some cases formed their own parties.

The corruption scandal emerged when incriminating phone recordings of ministers, including Recep Tayyip Erdoğan, were published on social media, prompting charges against six individuals for bugging the ministers' telephones. Although the recordings were identified as 'fakes' by the government, they failed to obtain any conclusive identification that proved the recordings to be fake. The CHP demanded the government's immediate resignation, though the then-Prime Minister Erdoğan refused to do so. The anti-corruption issue was strongly reflected in the CHP's local election campaign.

== Kurdish peace process ==
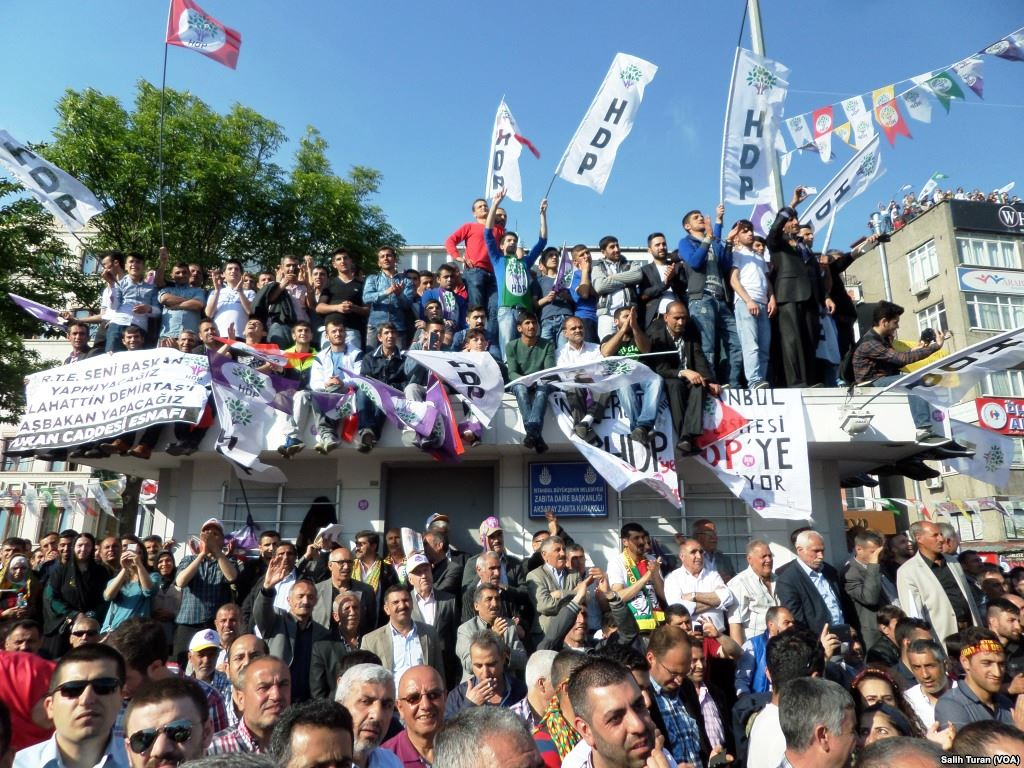
Supporters during a rally of the pro-Kurdish Peoples' Democratic Party (HDP)

Despite Deputy Prime Minister Bülent Arınç claiming that AKP would not be so 'undignified' or 'dishonourable' to negotiate with terrorists in 2010, a peace process focusing on disarming the PKK separatists has been in place since December 2012 with the intention of ending a conflict ongoing since 1984. The government's negotiation with terrorists as well as the terms of the solution process has since come under heavy scrutiny. Since then, Deputy Prime Minister Yalçın Akdoğan claimed that the AKP are the owners of the solution process.

During the 2014 presidential election campaign, the Peoples' Democratic Party (HDP) candidate Selahattin Demirtaş criticised the government for not complying with the terms of their own solution process. The peace process nearly dissolved during the Islamic State of Iraq and the Levant rebels' siege of the city of Kobanî due to the breakout of Kurdish nationalist demonstrations in protest at the government's lack of response. The death toll was estimated at over 50 people, while three soldiers were killed by the PKK. The AKP government subsequently blamed the HDP for the violence, with Davutoğlu claiming that their actions would result in the HDP losing all influence throughout the process. The government has also set up a Solution Process Council as well as a 'Board of Wise People' to oversee the ongoing efforts. During the initial formation of the parliamentary solution process commission, the CHP and MHP both boycotted the parliamentary vote that allowed the commission to be set up.

As the main opposition party, the CHP supports the notion of a peace process with separatist rebels and has called for such a process to include projects to alleviate poverty in south-east Anatolia. Closer involvement by the CHP in the peace process has been supported by HDP leader Selahattin Demirtaş, who claimed that the involvement of multiple parties in the process would increase transparency. In order to increase the party's appeal to Kurdish areas where the CHP has traditionally polled poorly, Kılıçdaroğlu began a new initiative named 'New CHP' (Yeni CHP or YCHP), which led to the opposition several nationalist MPs such as Emine Ülker Tarhan. On 29 November 2014, Kılıçdaroğlu made a speech in Diyarbakır and made a 12-point legislative proposal in regards to the solution process, which included motions to reduce the parliamentary threshold to 3%, clearing mines from land and assigning property rights to landless villagers, abolishing the village guard system and changing a new prison in Diyarbakır into a democracy museum.

In 2013, the Nationalist Movement Party (MHP) took several government officials, all 63 members of the 'Wise People Committee' and then-Prime Minister Recep Tayyip Erdoğan to court for acting unconstitutionally by negotiating with the PKK. However, in December 2014, the party agreed to support the process on the condition that the PKK unconditionally disarms. Journalists have speculated that the MHP manifesto would propose to end the solution process.

Criticisms of the solution process have mainly entered around the AKP's concessions to the PKK as well as the future of their currently imprisoned leader Abdullah Öcalan. Furthermore, the creation of PKK checkpoints around south-eastern cities by separatists as well as the lowering of a Turkish flag in Diyarbakır in 2014 has also caused concern that the south-east of Anatolia was effectively becoming an independent Kurdistan. Opposition journalists have alleged that the PKK have continued to attack soldiers and criticised the mainstream media for not reporting their deaths.

In March 2015, Erdoğan allegedly demanded that the government should suspend the peace process after noting that a significant portion of AKP voters were likely to defect to the MHP. The allegation comes at a time when relations between the government and president have become strained due to disagreements on the peace process. On 17 March, Erdoğan publicly denied that Turkey had a 'Kurdish problem'. In April, a military operation in Ağrı resulted in the death of 5 PKK militants, while 8 soldiers were injured and allegedly abandoned by the army after the operation. HDP leader Selahattin Demirtaş accused the government of planning the operation to sabotage the peace process and win votes by intentionally letting soldiers die, adding that HDP supporters helped the 8 wounded soldiers to reach a hospital after army helicopters abandoned them. Erdoğan retaliated by strongly denying the claims.

== Presidential system ==
On 19 January 2015, President Recep Tayyip Erdoğan chaired his first cabinet meeting since being elected president and became the first President to chair a cabinet meeting for over a decade. The Constitution of Turkey allows for the president to do so on consultation and advisory matters, although Erdoğan's decision to chair the meeting generated opposition as well as a domestic debate on his influence over the government. During the meeting, Erdoğan allegedly told ministers that Turkey needed a presidential system. The opposition Republican People's Party (CHP) claimed that there was no legitimate reason as to why Erdoğan would chair a cabinet meeting, stating that the President should give a reason before doing so. The CHP further accused Erdoğan for having an unlimited thirst for power.

On 27 January 2015, Erdoğan stated that the transfer from a parliamentary to a presidential system should and would be on the election agenda. He claimed that the type of the presidential system should be debated according to their various merits as shown by the different systems in France and the United States. Erdoğan put forward the major advantages of a presidential system to be more efficient decision-making as well as the end to the need of argument between the Prime Minister and President. He gave his often feudal relationship with former President Ahmet Necdet Sezer as an example and compared it to the considerably more relaxed relationship with Abdullah Gül. Claiming that the presidential system is a form of government that he had supported ever since his years as the Mayor of Istanbul, Erdoğan gave the United States as an example where separation of powers existed in response to accusations that his underlying agenda was to eradicate checks and balances.

Opinion polling on this issue indicate that the public strongly prefer the incumbent parliamentary system over any other alternative and also indicate that less than half of AKP voters support a change to a form of presidential system.

== 'Parallel state' ==
Opposition politicians and journalists have accused the government of conducting a 'perception operation' in order to vindicate themselves of any wrongdoing following a corruption scandal in December 2013. Since blaming the scandal on a 'coup attempt' by the exiled cleric Fethullah Gülen, the government began a crackdown against Gülen's alleged supporters ("Cemaat") in high judicial and law enforcement positions who were accused of running a 'parallel state'. The arrests of several policemen involved in investigating corruption charges have been labelled by the opposition as a 'perception operation' aiming to increase the legitimacy of the government's claims, with many having since been released a short while after being taken into custody. In retaliation, government ministers such as Erdoğan Bayraktar have blamed the opposition for conducting a 'perception operation' against the AKP by bringing the corruption allegations into the mainstream agenda and portraying the government in a bad way.

Fethullah Gülen was at one time a close ally of the AKP and had several supporters within the judiciary that helped imprison several army officers which the AKP considered to be a coup threat in 2007, through the use of the controversial Sledgehammer and Ergenekon trials. Gülen withdrew support from the AKP after the 2013 anti-government protests.

Government crackdowns against 'parallel' individuals within judicial and law enforcement offices have come under international scrutiny. While the AKP claims that the individuals arrested are part of a coup attempt orchestrated by Gülen, the opposition have condemned it as an erosion of democracy and judicial independence that has arisen from the AKP's attempts to eliminate opposition supporters from important offices. The government's crackdown against the 'parallel state' have included the reclaiming of overseas schools claimed to have been run by Cemaat, raiding the headquarters of the Zaman newspaper and attempting to close down Bank Asya. Tourism Minister Ömer Çelik has referred to the parallel state as a national security issue that is 'one of the gravest in the history of the republic'.

The AKP have also accused the opposition CHP and MHP of implicitly forming an alliance with Gülen, particularly during the 2014 local elections. However, CHP deputy leader Gürsel Tekin claimed on 19 January 2015 that the AKP's accusations came without evidence or foundation, further criticising to the AKP's 12 years of close alliance with the Cemaat Movement.

== Political polarisation ==
According to the AKP Deputy Prime Minister Bülent Arınç, the political scene in Turkey has deteriorated into a 'politics of hatred', emphasising how the government had suffered a heavy loss of respect from the opposition and a rise in the use of harsh and derogatory language between rival politicians. He claimed that despite this, the AKP had still won 50% of the vote in 2011 and it was the government's responsibility to smoothen the political situation.

A sharp rise in political polarisation has been observed since the Gezi Park protests, where the government openly responded with a heavy handed crackdown and referred to protestors as 'looters' and 'terrorists'. The AKP have used similar language to describe the CHP and MHP, which it claims are affiliated with the Gülen Movement. In response to the government corruption scandal in 2013, the CHP have referred to AKP politicians as 'thieves'. In retaliation, 320 AKP MPs allegedly sent CHP MPs using the term to court in 2014. Following the Soma mine disaster in 2014, the AKP were also called 'murderers' for what was widely interpreted to be a lack of workers' rights laws in the country. Political smearing has thus remained high throughout the election campaign.

Political disagreements and polarisation has also resulted in several cases of politically motivated assault, both between members of the public and also MPs within the Grand National Assembly. On 17 February 2015, AKP MPs threw chairs at the opposition, injuring five MPs including HDP MP Sebahat Tuncel, who was hit by a hammer. A second fight in parliament broke out two days later, resulting in the injury of two CHP MPs.

== Women's rights ==
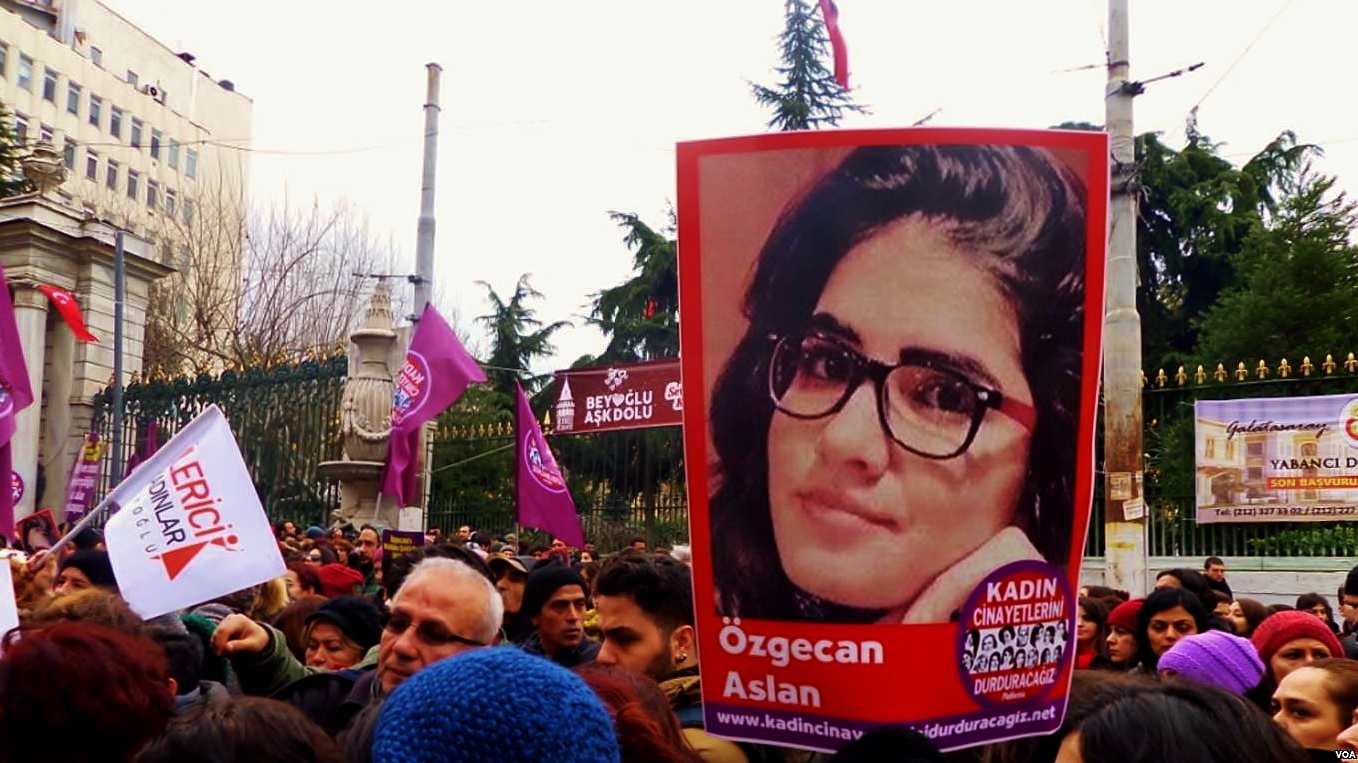
Protests in central Istanbul following the murder of Özgecan Aslan

In February 2015, a student named Özgecan Aslan was murdered after resisting rape in Tarsus, Mersin Province, causing national outrage and a large-scale campaign to encourage other women to share their experiences with harassment. Upon the capture of the perpetrators, who admitted the murder, debates regarding the reintroduction of the death penalty surfaced and received support from the Nationalist Movement Party.

The government received condemnation for a lack of action on the issue of women's rights, with particular criticism being directed to individuals who attempted to justify rape on social media by claiming that wearing non-conservative attire such as mini-skirts provoked it. The pro-government newspaper Yeni Akit, singer Nihat Doğan and President Recep Tayyip Erdoğan were all criticised for their response to the incident, with Doğan being particularly criticised for relating the incident to the effects of the secular system of government. Erdoğan, who was the AKP Prime Minister between 2003 and 2014, had previously declared that women are not equal to men and also criticised feminists for going against Islam during their protests following the incident. Women's rights activists linked comments made by Erdoğan and his fellow party members, such as "you cannot make men and women equal" by Erdoğan and "women should not laugh out loud in public" by Bülent Arınç to an alleged attempt to solidify gender roles and suppress women's rights.

CHP leader Kemal Kılıçdaroğlu accused the government of intervening in the private lives of citizens while not taking action against a sharp increase in sexual harassment, referring to a 658% rise in child drug use and a 1,400% rise in harassment claims since 2002.

== Workers' rights ==
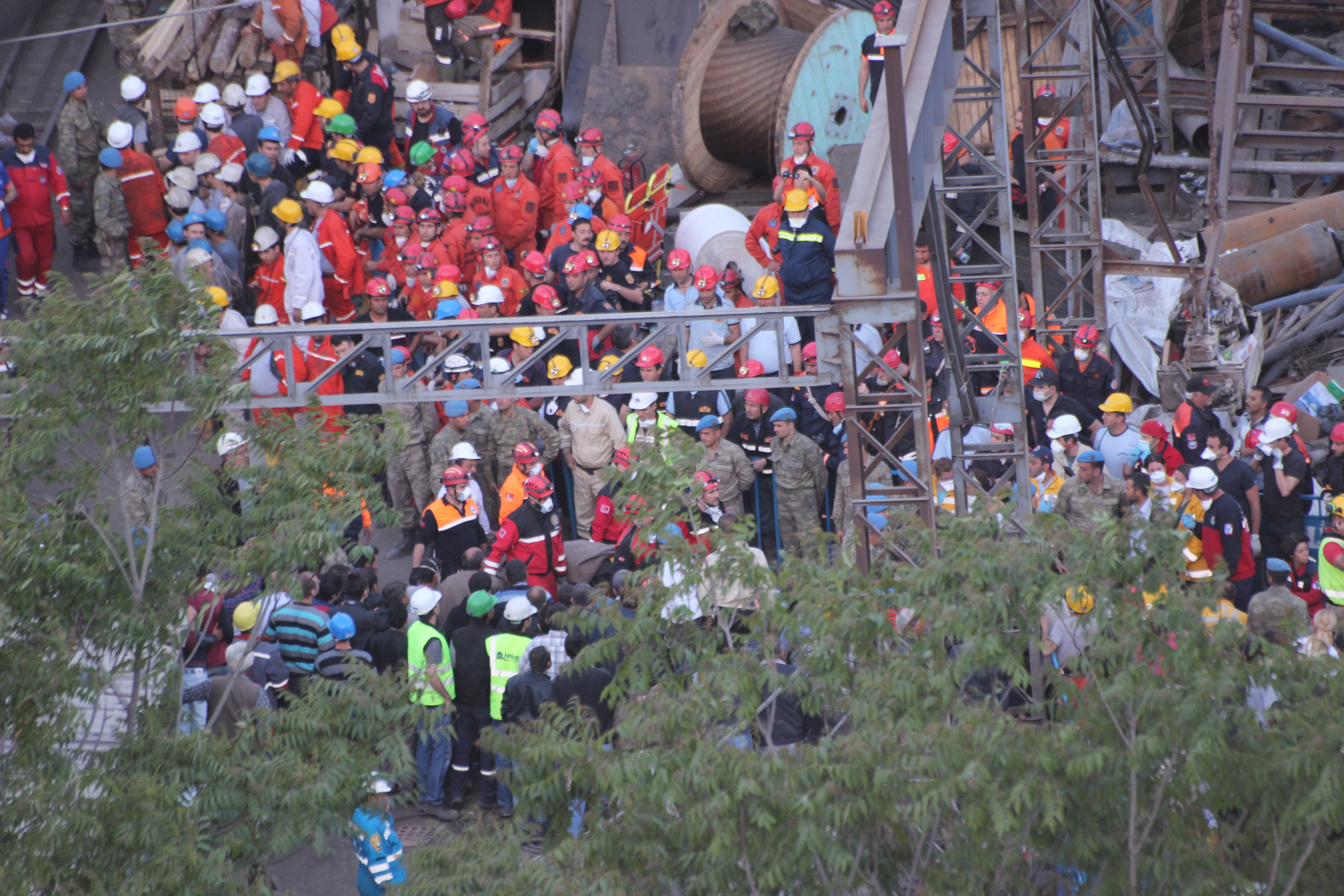
Rescue effort after the Soma mine collapse, May 2014

Turkey has the highest number of workers' deaths within Europe, which is the third highest in the world according to the International Labour Organization. The Turkish Statistics Office claims that 1,754 workers deaths have occurred between 2009 and 2014.

In May 2014, 301 miners were killed in Soma, Mersin Province after a coal mine collapsed. Although the government announced a period of mourning, heavy political opposition to the AKP's worker rights record resulted in a breakout in protests and a subsequent police crackdown. Particular attention was given to the fact that the opposition CHP had proposed a parliamentary motion to investigate previous mining accidents at Soma just two weeks before the incident, only to be rejected by the government. The AKP subsequently passed a law waiving the debts of the deceaseds' families, lowering the retirement age and also requiring companies to assign job security experts to their employees. The CHP have proposed abandoning the subcontractor system, strengthening trade unions and raising the wages of workers. The debate resurfaced after another mining incident occurred in Ermenek, Karaman Province in October 2014.

As a result of the mining disaster, AKP energy minister Taner Yıldız was expelled from the Ankara Board of Electrical Engineers in March 2015 for misusing his office for personal gain and in a way that did not conform to the standards of the Board or observe the safety of citizens.
