= Campaigning for the June 2015 Turkish general election =

Overview of parties which campaigned for the June 2015 Turkish general election

In the run-up to the Turkish general election of June 2015, many political parties engaged in campaign efforts to increase their vote shares. The main contesting parties were the governing incumbent Justice and Development Party (AKP) led by Ahmet Davutoğlu, the Republican People's Party (CHP) led by Kemal Kılıçdaroğlu, the Nationalist Movement Party (MHP) led by Devlet Bahçeli and the Peoples' Democratic Party (HDP) co-led by Selahattin Demirtaş and Figen Yüksekdağ. These four parties are the only parties with a realistic chance of surpassing the 10% parliamentary threshold to gain representation in the Grand National Assembly of Turkey

Opinion polling for the June 2015 Turkish general election show that the AKP is on course to win a plurality of the vote with around 40%, the CHP remaining relatively stable at 25% and the MHP registering a large increase in their vote share by polling close to 20%. The HDP is critically hovering at the 10% boundary, with several polls showing the party surpassing it or scoring just below. Opinion polls in Turkey, however, are notoriously unreliable due to their alleged bias in favour of certain political organisations. Many polling companies have no record of existence and proper reports on polling operations are rarely provided by firms.

== Overview ==
The following are the main parties that have engaged in active campaigning in the run-up to the election.

Party		Leader(s)	Ideology	Slogans	
Party		Leader(s)	Ideology	In Turkish	In English
AKP	Justice and Development Party	Ahmet Davutoğlu	Conservative democracy	Hep Birlikte Yeni Türkiye; Daima Adalet, Daima Kalkınma	All together for a New Turkey; Justice forever, Development forever
CHP	Republican People's Party	Kemal Kılıçdaroğlu	Social democracy Kemalism	Milletçe Alkışlıyoruz; Korkmayın, Yılmayın, Sinmeyin; Yaşanacak bir Türkiye; Gelin oy verin gitsinler	We Applaud Nationally; Do not be afraid, do not give up, do not cower A Liveable Turkey; Come and vote so they [the AKP] leave
MHP	Nationalist Movement Party	Devlet Bahçeli	Turkish nationalism	Bizimle Yürü Türkiye	Walk with us, Turkey
HDP	Peoples' Democratic Party	Selahattin Demirtaş; Figen Yüksekdağ	Democratic socialism Kurdish nationalism	Yeni Yaşam; Biz'ler HDP, Biz'ler Meclise	New Life; We are HDP, us for Parliament

== Justice and Development Party (AKP) ==
The AKP has publicly targeted 330 seats in order to be able to submit constitutional changes to a referendum. With drafting a new constitution being a central part of the AKP's manifesto, the party is expected to promote a presidential system and an advancement in the Solution process with Kurdish rebels in a new constitution. Critics have argued that such efforts would lead to a further decline in the separation of powers and democratic checks and balances, while the AKP has argued that the current constitution is outdated. Despite being constitutionally barred from being partisan, President Recep Tayyip Erdoğan made several statements in the lead-up to the election that set the AKP's electoral targets higher at 400 MPs, though even pro-AKP polling organisations show that such an eventuality is highly unlikely.

Announcing the party's manifesto on 15 April, Davutoğlu claimed that his party aimed to win 55% of the votes, and criticised Kılıçdaroğlu for his target of 35%.

=== Extraordinary Congress, 27 August 2014 ===
Party	Candidate	Votes	%
AKP	Ahmet Davutoğlu	1,382	100.0
Invalid/blank votes		6	–
Total		1,388	100.0
Number of delegates/turnout		1,420	97.7

Prime Minister Erdoğan, who was re-elected for a third time in the 2011 general election, was barred from standing as an MP for a fourth term by the AKP's by-laws. Erdoğan became his party's presidential candidate for the 2014 presidential election and won narrowly in the first round with 51.79% of the vote. His ascension to the presidency required him to sever all ties with political parties and step down from parliament, requiring the AKP to elect a new leader.

On 21 August 2014, Erdoğan chaired an AKP Central Executive Committee meeting, after which Foreign Minister Ahmet Davutoğlu was announced as a candidate for the leadership. Davutoğlu was unanimously elected unopposed as the AKP's 2nd leader on 27 August 2014, a day before Erdoğan was due to take over as president from Abdullah Gül. The fact that there was no rival, combined with the exclusive means by which Davutoğlu was effectively declared as Erdoğan's successor by the Central Executive Committee, led to criticism and concern about inner-party democracy.

=== Candidate selection ===
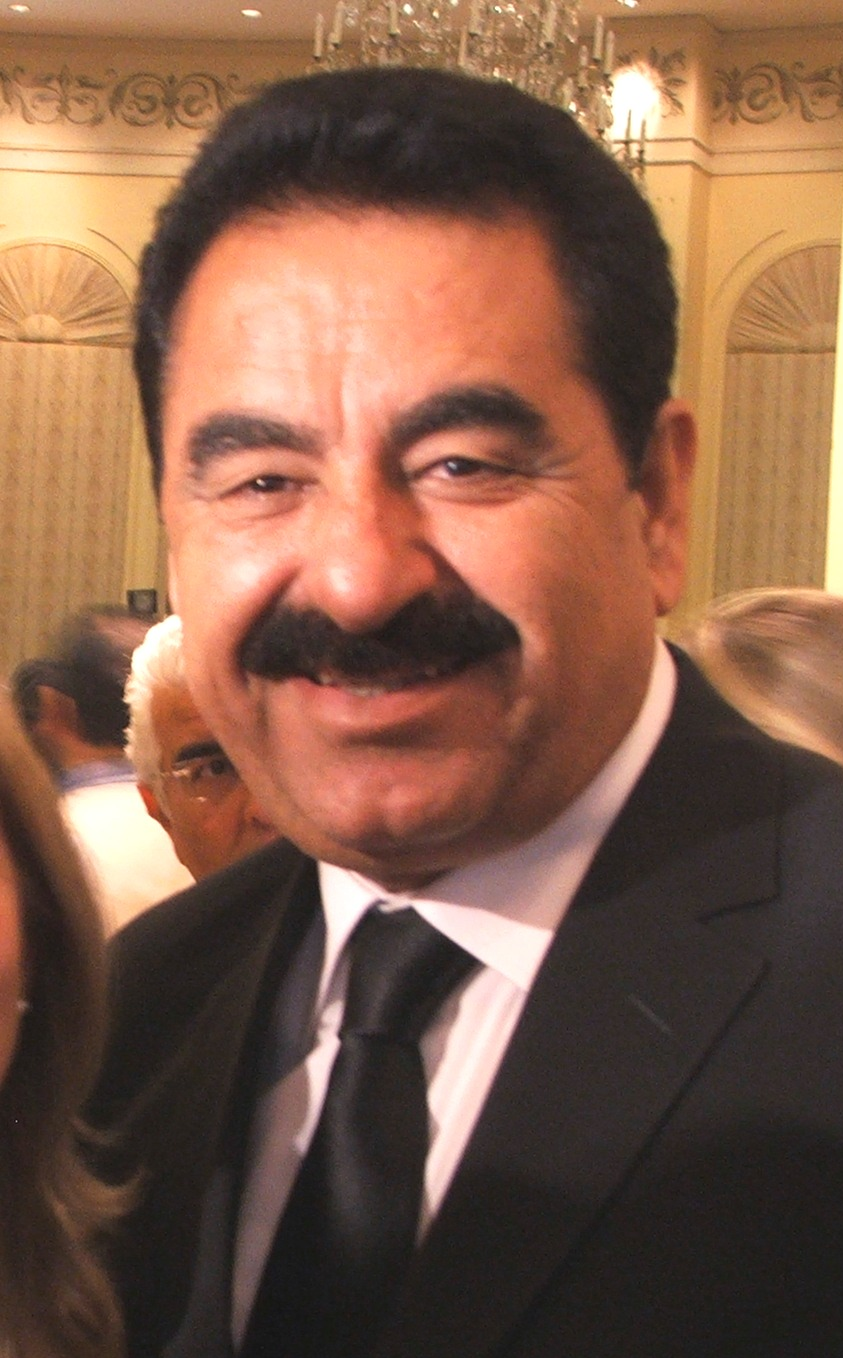
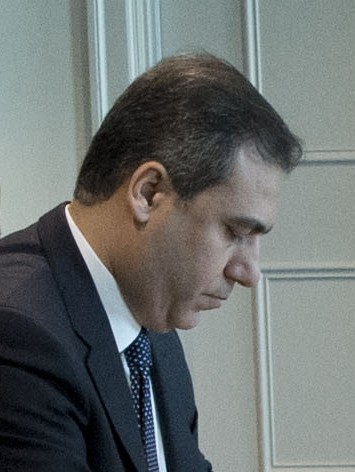
Singer İbrahim Tatlıses (left) and MİT undersecretary Hakan Fidan (right) both applied, without success, to become AKP candidates

Due to the AKP by-law that prohibits party candidates from running for more than three parliamentary terms, founding members of the party who first entered parliament in the 2002 general election will not be able to seek election in 2015. As a result, the party has indicated that founding members will occupy senior positions within the party structure following the elections. In a four-point candidate selection strategy, the AKP has intended to maintain its constant renewal of candidates as had occurred in the 2011 general election without abandoning key figures or fundamental principles. The party will also aim to recruit university law, engineering and medical graduates into the party while also reducing the average age of its parliamentary group by offering candidates under the age of 30 an active role in politics. The AKP has also expressed intentions to elect over 80 female MPs to Parliament. Provincial congresses are due to finish on 15 February.

Candidates for the AKP party lists were able to submit applications between the 11th and 20th of February, with male candidates pain ₺5,000, female candidates paying ₺2,500 and disabled candidates being able to apply without charge. Inspections into prospective candidates are due to take place between the 28th of February and the 1st of March, while interviews are due to be conducted between the 6th and 15th of March.

The undersecretary of the National Intelligence Organisation (MİT), Hakan Fidan, resigned in order to stand as an AKP candidate in the election, despite objections from Deputy Prime Minister Bülent Arınç. Fidan later withdrew his candidacy.

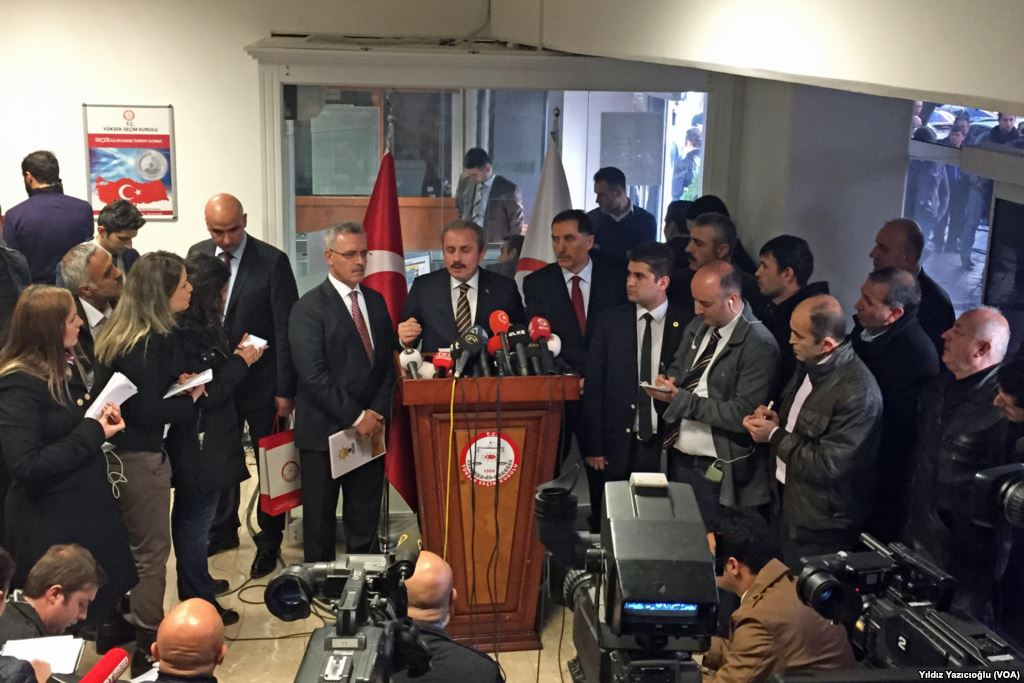
The AKP handing over their candidate lists to the Supreme Electoral Council of Turkey, 7 April 2015.

Sources have indicated a potential split between Prime Minister Davutoğlu and President Erdoğan over the AKP lists to be put forward for election, with both politicians putting forward rival lists.

Some applicants advertised their candidacies by depicting themselves on their campaign posters with Ottoman-style attire to comply with the AKP's promotion of Ottoman-era culture and politics. A notable applicant, Osman Yavuz from Konya, became a Twitter sensation after his Ottoman-style campaign advertisement went viral. Yavuz was not selected as an AKP parliamentary candidate.

Full candidate lists were released on 7 April, with 175 MPs being unable to secure renomination. Notable MPs who failed to secure a place on the party lists included controversial Balıkesir MP Tülay Babuşcu. The son of Ankara mayor Melih Gökçek failed to secure nomination, while singer İbrahim Tatlıses and model Tuğçe Kazaz were also unable to obtain candidacy. President Erdoğan's son in law secured 6th place on the party's candidate list for Istanbul's 1st electoral district. An AKP parliamentary hopeful who failed to make the party list committed suicide shortly after the successful candidates were announced.

=== Attacks against the opposition ===
On 28 January, the AKP's spokesperson Beşir Atalay called the CHP leader Kemal Kılıçdaroğlu a politician 'that could not be taken seriously' who had fallen into a 'funny situation'. He claimed that Kılıçdaroğlu was a 'puppet' of Fethullah Gülen and criticised him for objecting to Turkey's one-day period of mourning over the death of King Abdullah of Saudi Arabia while sending a message of condolences to the deceased's successor King Salman at the same time.

==== Bülent Arınç – Melih Gökçek polemic ====
In a response regarding the ongoing Solution process with Kurdish rebels, Deputy Prime Minister Bülent Arınç criticised President Erdoğan for making comments that allegedly interfered with the government's policy. Both Erdoğan and the AKP Mayor of Ankara Melih Gökçek subsequently criticised Arınç, with Gökçek taking to Twitter to demand Arınç's resignation, accusing him of being a supporter of Fethullah Gülen and constantly bringing the AKP into disrepute. Arınç responded by stating that Gökçek was too dishonourable to demand his resignation and that responding with abuse would only be bringing himself down to Gökçek's level. Arınç also claimed that Gökçek was trying to guarantee a position on the AKP party lists for his son, to which Gökçek responded by saying that Arınç should be sacked from his position since his chances of resigning were unlikely. After a series of abusive exchanges between Arınç and Gökçek, both threatened to take the other to court. Despite a statement from Prime Minister Davutoğlu warning both men to end their arguments, Arınç made a statement accusing Gökçek of bringing personal and family issues into the political sphere, for which he would not respect the Prime Minister's demands. The Ankara Attorney General began a criminal investigation into both individuals, though Arınç has parliamentary immunity from prosecution until the election.

=== Split allegations ===
Allegations emerged on 23 March 2015 that former President Abdullah Gül is seeking to form a new party with other senior AKP figures such as Ali Babacan, Taner Yıldız and Mehmet Şimşek who are not allowed to seek a fourth term as AKP MPs. Gül allegedly gave the order to put 'the opposite of what Erdoğan has done' and also 'what the AKP has failed to do' in the party's manifesto. Although it remained unclear whether Gül would be leading the new party, it was said by his senior advisor Ahmet Takan that he was certain to be the new party's presidential candidate for the 2019 presidential election. After being asked about the AKP's candidate lists that were made public on 7 April, Gül publicly wished all the candidates well in the election.

=== Electoral rallies ===
During a provincial congress at İzmir, Davutoğlu announced his intention to establish a Prime Ministerial office there with an intention to increase his presence in the city after the election. İzmir is seen as the key stronghold of the opposition CHP, thus making it an important electoral target for the AKP who made substantial gains throughout İzmir Province during the 2014 local elections and the 2011 general election. Davutoğlu's bid to establish a Prime Ministerial office, which currently only exists in Ankara and Istanbul has been seen as a bid to raise the city's profile and increase the AKP's influence over the city should they win the election.

== Republican People's Party (CHP) ==
The party leader Kemal Kılıçdaroğlu stated that his party would lead the next government if they won 35% of the vote. This indicates a 9% rise since the 2011 general election.

=== Extraordinary Convention, 8 September 2014 ===
Party	Candidate	Votes	%
CHP	Kemal Kılıçdaroğlu	740	64.1
CHP	Muharrem İnce	415	35.9
Invalid/blank votes		26	–
Total		1,181	100.0
Number of delegates/turnout		1,218	94.8

The loss of the CHP's presidential candidate Ekmeleddin İhsanoğlu in the 2014 presidential election resulted in several senior party members losing confidence in the leadership of Kemal Kılıçdaroğlu, forcing him to call a leadership election. The party's performance in the 2014 local elections also drew speculation that Kılıçdaroğlu would resign after the party lost control of its stronghold Antalya and failed to win in Ankara or Istanbul. In the extraordinary convention held on 8 September 2014, Kılıçdaroğlu ran for re-election. Two other candidates, former parliamentary group leader Muharrem İnce and a former Kars parliamentary candidate Şahmar Dalmış declared their candidacy for the party leadership. Dalmış was unable to contest the election since he failed to secure any nominations.

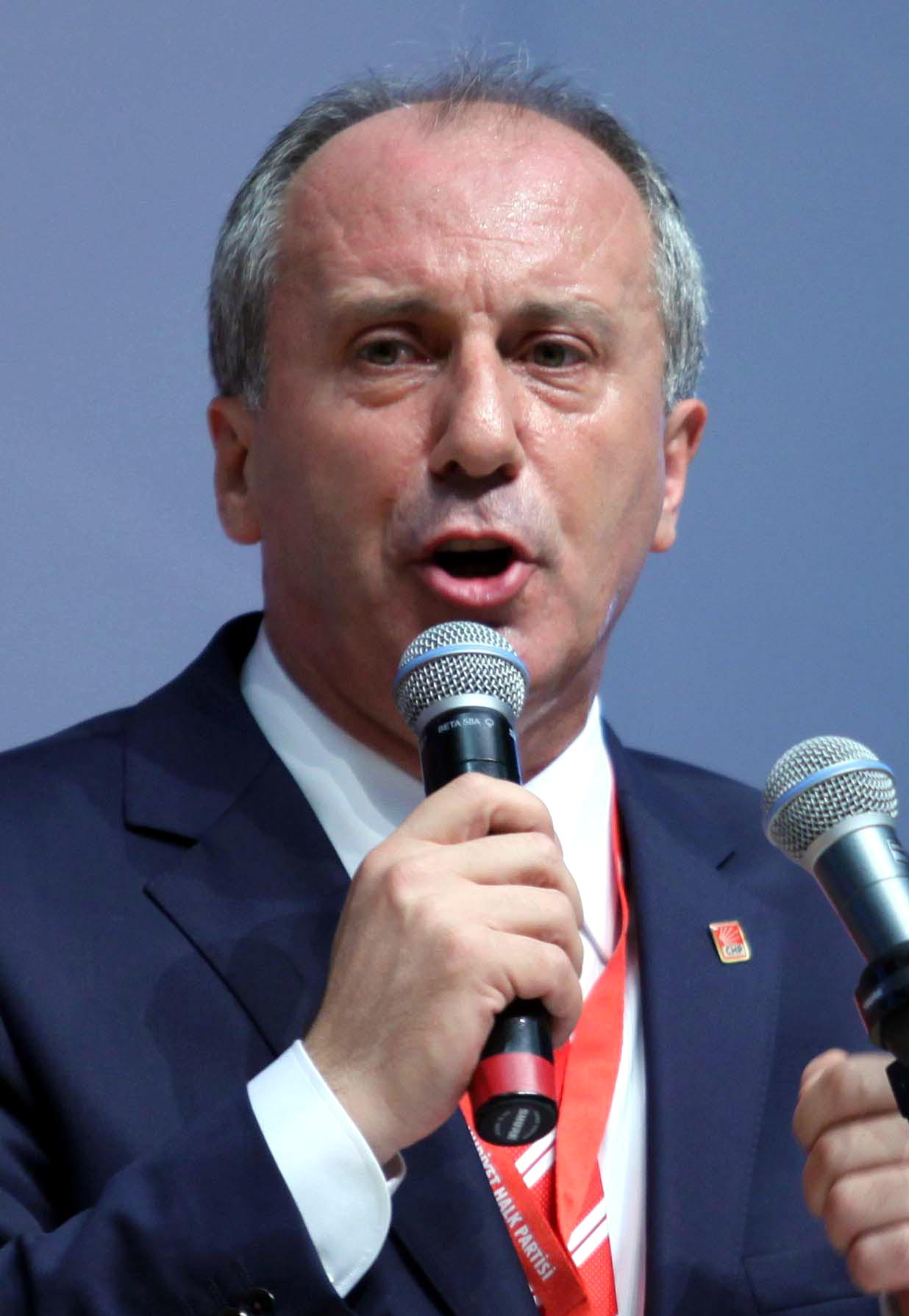
Muharrem İnce giving his leadership candidacy speech during the 2014 convention

Opinion polls showed that Kılıçdaroğlu was significantly more popular in south-eastern provinces, while İnce maintained more support throughout the west of the country. The delegationary system resulted in Kılıçdaroğlu winning comfortably with 64.1% of the delegates' vote, despite opinion polls showing that İnce was more popular with the party's voters. Kılıçdaroğlu had initially been endorsed for the leadership by 84.2% of the delegates while İnce received the remaining 15.8% of the nominations, which was just 0.8% more than necessary to be eligible to run for election. In the leadership election, İnce won 35.9% and immediately conceded defeat.

=== Candidate selection ===
Key individuals who have applied to become CHP parliamentary candidates have included the President of the Turkish Bars Association Metin Feyzioğlu and the head of the Journalists' Association Atilla Serter. Both have applied to become candidates in İzmir's 2nd electoral district. The leader of the Rize Anatolian School family union Osman Erdoğan, a relative of Recep Tayyip Erdoğan, defected from the AKP to the CHP in early 2015.

Over 150 public sector workers have allegedly resigned in order to seek candidacy from the CHP, though many have reportedly withdrawn their resignations due to a lack of endorsement from CHP central offices. Candidates will be chosen either through preliminary elections or by the party leader Kemal Kılıçdaroğlu. The party leader will select a total of 27 candidates; 15 from Istanbul, 6 each from Ankara and İzmir and 1 each from Bursa, Eskişehir, Gaziantep, Adana, Mersin, Muğla, Manisa, Denizli and Aydın. In Istanbul, Kılıçdaroğlu will select five candidates from each electoral subdistrict for a total of 15. The party's spokesman Haluk Koç announced the fees for application to be ₺7,500 for those wishing to apply for candidacy through selection by the leadership. In order to stand in preliminary elections that were held in 51 provinces, the fees were ₺5,000 for men and ₺2,500 for women and disabled people.

Candidate applications ended on 2 March 2015 with 2,822 applications. The first nomination primaries were held in Zonguldak, Mersin, Malatya and Adıyaman on the same day. Most nomination primaries were held towards the end of March, with Kılıçdaroğlu himself securing his nomination in İzmir's 2nd electoral district. Former party leader Deniz Baykal contested the preliminary elections in Antalya, though notably failed come first. Mustafa Sarıgül came 9th in the Istanbul 2nd electoral district election, failing even to win in the district of Şişli where he had served as Mayor between 1999 and 2014. CHP supporters in Trabzon and Ardahan protested the lack of preliminary elections happening in their provinces. Frustrated youth wing members occupied the CHP provincial headquarters in Trabzon, after which it was decided to hold preliminary elections there instead. Turnout in İzmir was 55%, though turnouts were considerably higher in other provinces such as Isparta, where 74% of CHP members voted.

Candidates who applied for selection by the party leadership were chosen in early April. Key candidates such as Kamer Genç, Hüseyin Aygün and Umut Oran failed to make the party lists. A female Armenian candidate and a Romani candidate were both amongst the CHP lists, with the potential to become the first female Armenian and Romani MP in the history of the Turkish Republic. A CHP Istanbul MP who failed to secure renomination, Faik Tunay, claimed that he would make revelations about his party in a press conference. Şafak Pavey, who initially did not seek renomination, was persuaded to stand again as a CHP candidate and was selected as the CHP's first candidate in Istanbul's 1st electoral district.

=== Electoral alliance negotiations ===
The CHP has expressed interest in negotiating with the left-wing HDP as well as other left-wing parties such as the Labour Party (EMEP) and the Freedom and Solidarity Party (ÖDP). Despite this, CHP leader Kemal Kılıçdaroğlu identified the HDP as a threat to the party's support base during a Central Executive Committee meeting on 29 January and has sought to take 'measures' against the HDP. The ÖDP has ruled out negotiating with the CHP while the EMEP leader Selma Gürkan has stressed the importance of doing so.

Despite key HDP leaders being opposed to talks with the CHP, the party's deputy leader Sezgin Tanrıkulu is allegedly engaged in closed negotiations with the HDP so that the talks do not generate controversy within the party's parliamentary group or voters. Several party members have resigned or openly criticised the CHP for seeking an alliance with the HDP. Workers' Party leader Doğu Perinçek claimed that the AKP had 'left' the terrorist group PKK in the 'lap of the CHP' in the lead-up to elections. As part of this potential electoral strategy, candidacies would be offered to the mother of Ali İsmail Korkmaz and the father of Berkin Elvan, both of whom were killed by government forces during the 2013 Gezi Park protests.

=== Alleged closure case ===
In March 2015, a document allegedly regarding a closure case against the Republican People's Party was leaked online, causing many opposition politicians to accuse the AKP of attempting to eliminate competition through anti-democratic practices. The party's leader Kemal Kılıçdaroğlu confirmed the claims, stating that he had known about the preparations for a closure case for some time. According to Kılıçdaroğlu, the case would involve the printing of a controversial book about Turkey's president Mustafa Kemal Atatürk by the AKP, which will be found illegal by the courts and lead to the closure of the CHP since the party itself was founded by Atatürk.

AKP leader Ahmet Davutoğlu denied the claims and called for Kılıçdaroğlu to meet with him to put forward a constitutional amendment that would make it impossible for a political party to be shut down by the courts. This led to speculation that the closure case threat was in fact an attempt by the AKP to amend the constitution and avoid any closure cases against themselves in the future, having narrowly survived one in 2008 and an earlier case in 2001.

=== Controversies ===
Controversy has risen over alleged links between the CHP and the exiled cleric Fethullah Gülen, who was formerly an AKP ally who withdrew support from Erdoğan in 2013. Amid allegations that Gülen had considered the CHP as a possible means of maintaining political influence in Turkey despite staunch differences in ideology, the CHP has come under increasing fire by the government and its own supporters for alleged collaborations with Gülen, who was once a fierce critic of the CHP. İzmir MP Birgül Ayman Güler resigned from the CHP in January 2015, accusing the CHP of collaborating with Gülen during the 2014 local elections. In February, CHP deputy leader Sezgin Tanrıkulu applied to the Ministry of Justice for a permit to visit Hidayet Karaca in Silivri Prison. Karaca, who is the head of the pro-Gülen Samanyolu TV, was taken into custody in 2014 for allegedly establishing a terrorist organisation. The party has also supported Bank Asya, a pro-Gülen bank that the AKP government attempted to shut down in 2014.

=== Policies ===
In a document named the 'Vision of Justice, Freedom and Development', the CHP have outlined their main policies to guarantee workers' rights by removing the controversial 'Taşeron' system and bring about social democracy. In addition, the party has aimed at doubling welfare benefits while also increasing the social welfare of ten million retired citizens. Furthermore, the party will aim to liberalise the education system while also targeting child labour and growing unemployment. A commitment has also been made to preserve the separation of powers within the state as opposed to an 'elected monarchy' which the party accuse the AKP of trying to establish.

Party leader Kemal Kılıçdaroğlu presented a four-point pledge, signed by a notary, that committed to giving bonuses to pensioners during Eid al-Fitr and Eid al-Adha. He claimed that these arrangements would remain for every year that he is Prime Minister and that he would resign as Prime Minister and party leader if he did not meet his pledge.

=== Criticism of the government ===
Party leader Kemal Kılıçdaroğlu accused Ahmet Davutoğlu of not knowing anything about new legislation, arguing that they were handed down to him by his superiors. He accused the AKP of treating voters like 'second class citizens' and called the CHP a 'second home' for voters.

=== Electoral rallies ===
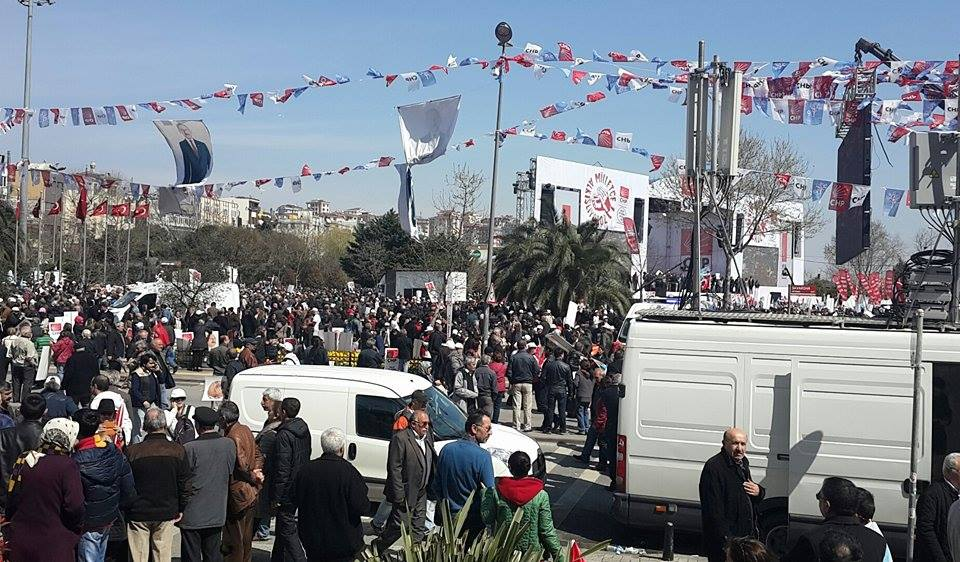
The CHP's Milletçe Alkışlıyoruz electoral rally in Kartal, Istanbul (11 April)

The CHP planned 50 electoral rallies throughout Turkey in what Kılıçdaroğlu styled as a 'meeting marathon' (Miting maratonu). During visits to different provinces, Kılıçdaroğlu is also due to make unplanned visits to town centres and other public places to meet with voters directly. Special measures were taken for people with disabilities, with the party accompanying its televised electoral rallies with sign language.

The CHP's inaugural electoral rally was held on 11 April in the Kartal district of Istanbul. The rally was styled as the 'National Applause rally' (Milletçe Alkışlıyoruz mitingi). During the rally, Kılıçdaroğlu appeared to unveil a new slogan, 'Do not be afraid, do not give up, do not cower' (Korkmayın, yılmayın, sinmeyin).

== Nationalist Movement Party (MHP) ==
The MHP has implemented one of the lowest application fees of any party for potential candidates. Between 12 and 18 March, all male, female and disabled citizens wishing to apply had to pay a fee of ₺2,000. The MHP had charged ₺2,500 in the 2011 general election. In response to plans to build a hotel in a greenfield site at İstinye in Istanbul, the MHP organised a seed-planting protest in the area In January. Actor Mehmet Aslan allegedly declared his potential candidacy during the event.

== Peoples' Democratic Party (HDP) ==
Emboldened by the 9.77% of the vote won by Peoples' Democratic Party co-leader Selahattin Demirtaş in the 2014 presidential election, The HDP is due to contest the election by fielding party candidates rather than independent candidates by the order of Abdullah Öcalan. This has been controversial since all of the HDP's votes would be transferred to the AKP in the event that the HDP fails to win above 10% of the vote. There has been speculation as to whether the AKP forced Öcalan to pressure the HDP to contest the election as a party in order to boost their own number of MPs. The party charged a ₺2,000 application fee for prospective male candidates, a ₺1,000 fee for female and young candidates under the age of 27 and no fee was collected from disabled applicants. Applications for candidacy were received between 16 February and 2 March.

According to Habertürk, the party has proposed to field Kurdish candidates in the west and Turkish candidates in the east, which is the opposite of the demographic make-up of the country. The party is also expected to increase its popularity by offering candidacies to famous individuals, such as actor Kadir İnanır. According to a private poll conducted by the HDP in January 2015, the party needs to gather around 600,000 more supporters by the general election in order to surpass the election threshold of 10% and win 72 MPs. Polling organisations such as Metropoll, however, predict that the party would win around 55 MPs if they won more than 10%. It is hoped by HDP candidates that the victory of the left-wing SYRIZA in the 2015 Greek legislative election in January would result in a boost in popularity.

In order to maximise their votes, the party's co-leader Figen Yüksekdağ has announced that the HDP will begin negotiations with the United June Movement, a socialist intellectual and political platform that includes left-wing parties such as the Freedom and Solidarity Party (ÖDP) and the Labour Party (EMEP). Negotiations between parties began taking place in early 2015, with the intention of forming a broad alliance rather than a strict political coalition. Although Yüksekdağ ruled out negotiating with the CHP since they were 'closed to dialogue' and Demirtaş was opposed to negotiations, CHP deputy leader Sezgin Tanrıkulu said that the CHP was open for talks and that the two parties had until 7 April to come to an agreement.

== Democratic Left Party (DSP) ==
Similar to the 2007 general election, the Democratic Left Party was expected to form an electoral alliance with the CHP and list joint candidates rather than contest the election on their own. However, in March 2015, DSP leader Masum Türker announced that the DSP would not form an alliance with the CHP and pulled out of negotiations. In a press conference in Bursa, Türker claimed that his party faced significant damage by running alongside the CHP in 2007, stating that the CHP had not kept to their word and several DSP candidates had defected during the course of the 23rd parliament. He also accused CHP leader Kemal Kılıçdaroğlu of tying to display DSP candidates as CHP supporters and attempting to convince voters that he had 'decimated' the DSP. Türker further stated that the CHP could form a coalition if the DSP managed to enter parliament.

Applications to become DSP candidates will end on 31 March 2015, with all applicants paying ₺1,000.

== New parties ==
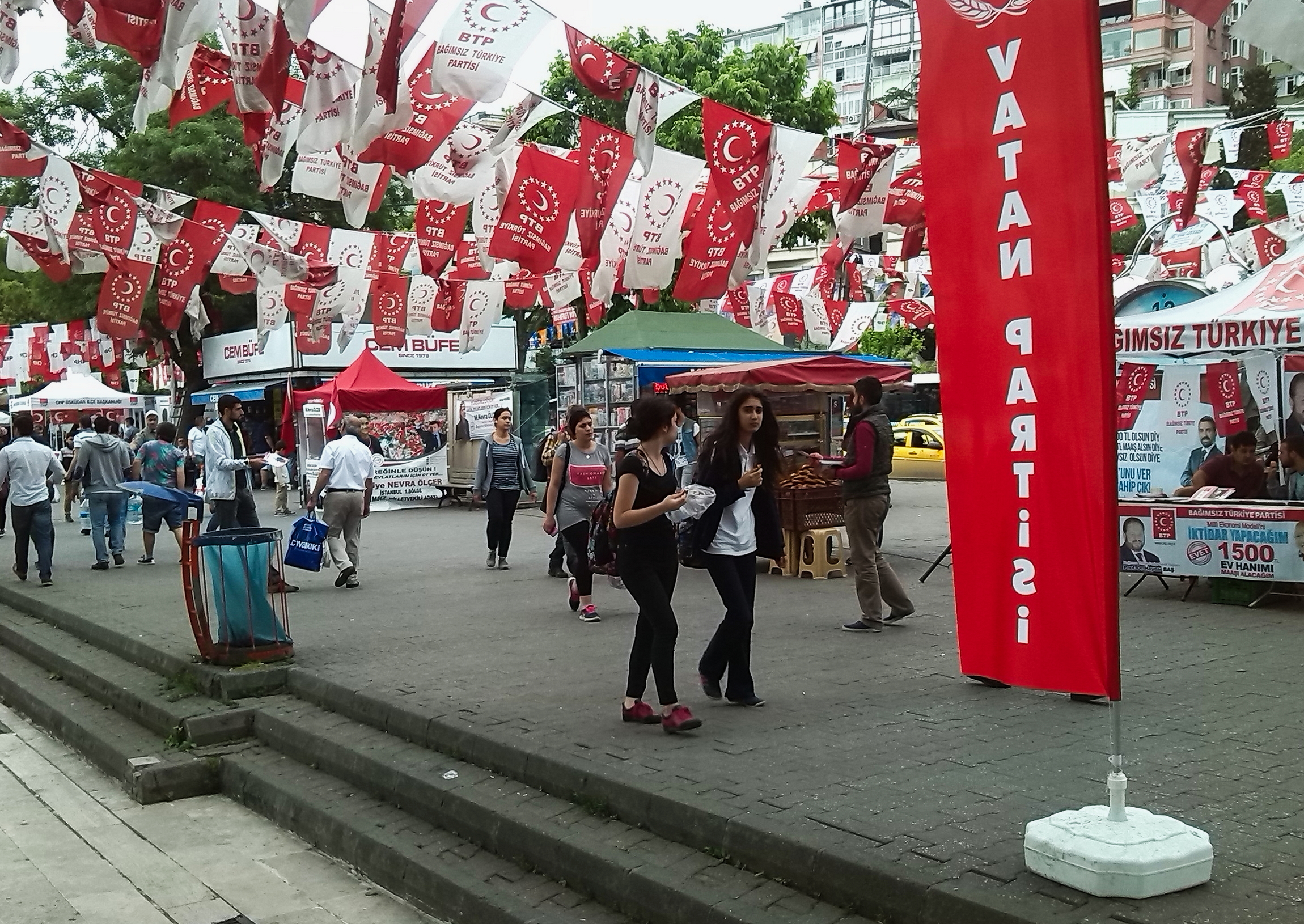
The Turkish general elections campaigns of the parties Bağımsız Türkiye Partisi (BTP) and Vatan Partisi in Istanbul in June 2015.

In the year leading up to the election, several small political parties were founded mainly due to the dissatisfaction with the established political forces. They were mostly formed by defectors in parliament from the AKP or CHP. The following is a list of new political parties formed close to the election.

Party		Leader	Ideology	Founded	Split from	Contesting election?
VP	Patriotic Party	Doğu Perinçek	Scientific socialism	15 February 2015	Workers' Party	✓
eP	Electronic Democracy Party	Emrehan Halıcı	E-democracy	26 November 2014	Republican People's Party	✗
MMP	National Struggle Party	Ahmet Kaya	Turkish nationalism	25 November 2014	Nationalist Movement Party	✗
MİLAD	Nation and Justice Party	İdris Naim Şahin	Civic nationalism	19 November 2014	Justice and Development Party	✗
ANAPAR	Anatolia Party	Emine Ülker Tarhan	Progressivism	14 November 2014	Republican People's Party	✓
DGP	Democratic Progress Party	İdris Bal	Liberal conservatism	4 November 2014	Justice and Development Party	✗
KP	Communist Party	Özlem Şen Abay	Communism	17 July 2014	Communist Party of Turkey	✓
MEP	Centre Party	Abdurrahim Karslı	Centrism	2 June 2014	New party	✓

== Opinion polling ==
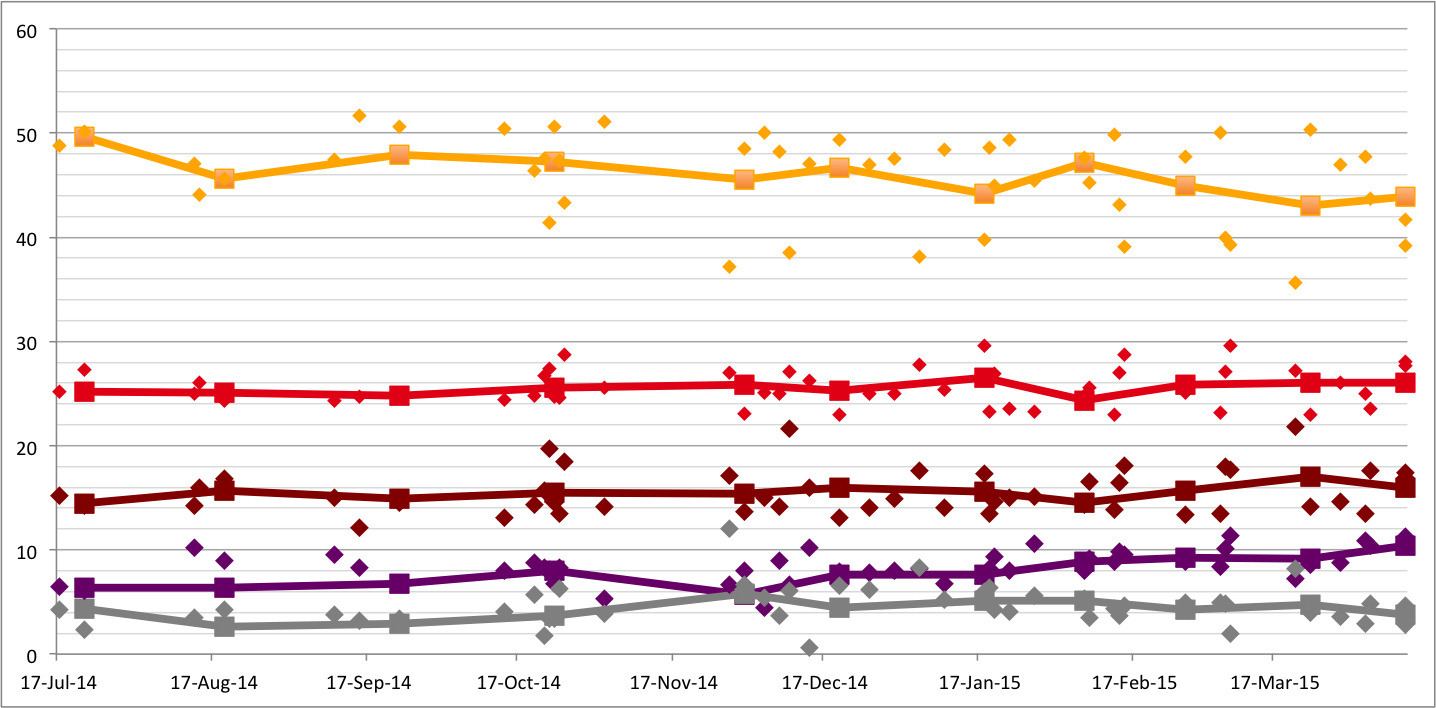
Opinion polling for the 2015 general election

== Controversies ==
=== Campaigning restrictions ===
On 3 March, the governor of İzmir took a series of decisions curbing the ability of citizens to protest against the 'established order', limiting freedom of expression and limiting all forms of political propaganda and demonstrations to written statements only. The İzmir Bars Association stated that they would appeal against the decisions, accusing them of being undemocratic and counterproductive. The decisions were later reversed by the governor's office amid heavy protests on social media.

=== Media censorship ===
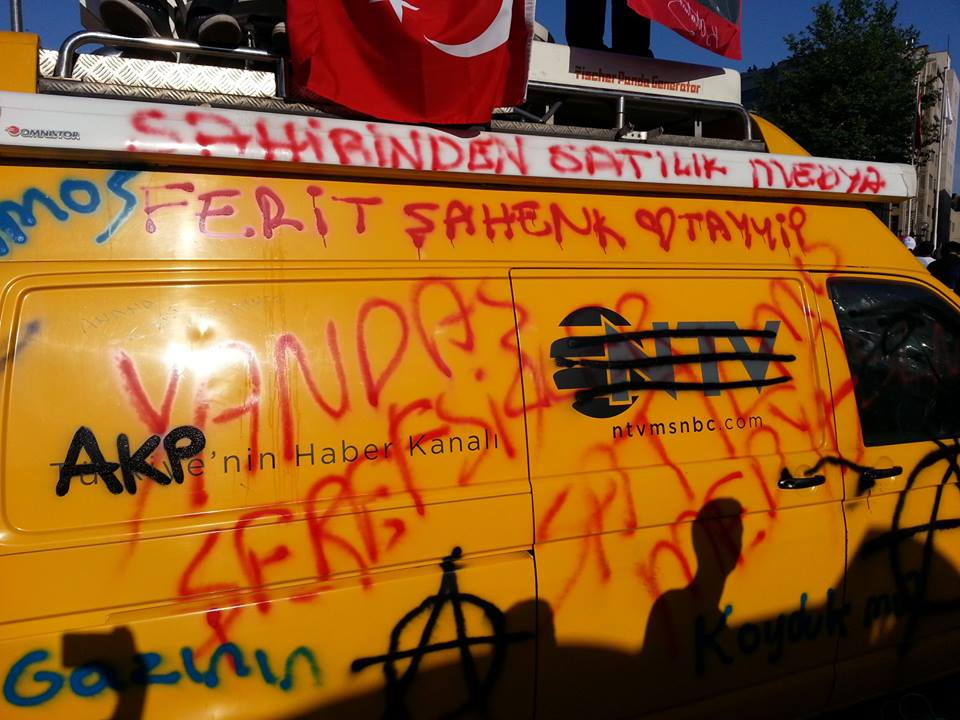
An NTV news van covered in anti-AKP protest graffiti in response to their lack of coverage of the Gezi Park protests in 2013

On 7 April, Twitter, Facebook, YouTube and 166 other websites were blocked for distributing the images of DHKP-C terrorists taking Istanbul prosecutor Mehmet Selim Kiraz hostage. The court responsible for the block argued that the images could be used as propaganda for the terrorist organisation and were distressing for the prosecutor's family. In addition, criminal investigations were launched into four newspapers that also features the images. The proximity of the block to the election, which bears similarity to the blocking of social media sites just weeks before the 2014 local elections, raised accusations of growing government censorship against opposition views. Allegations were also made that social media sites were blocked to stop potential incriminating evidence regarding the government's involvement in the hostage crisis from emerging.

The state-funded broadcaster Turkish Radio and Television Corporation (TRT) took the decision to not broadcast a campaign advert by the opposition CHP, because it was perceived to be openly critical of the governing AKP. The advert featured a cat walking near a transformer, seen as a reference to the AKP Minister of Energy Taner Yıldız's claims that nationwide electricity cuts during the 2014 local elections occurred due to cat entering a transformer. The TRT, which has previously been accused of pro-government bias, was accused of censorship and subsequently taken to court by the CHP. A CHP delegate to the media regulator RTÜK, Ali Öztunç, later claimed that the advert had not broken any laws and that the AKP was directly behind the censorship. A tradesman from Düzce sent the CHP to court for causing provocation and protesting rival parties by applauding, referencing the CHP's 'National Applause' themed election campaign. The individual was later discovered to be the director of public broadcasting for the pro-AKP Diriliş newspaper.
