= Public image of Recep Tayyip Erdoğan =

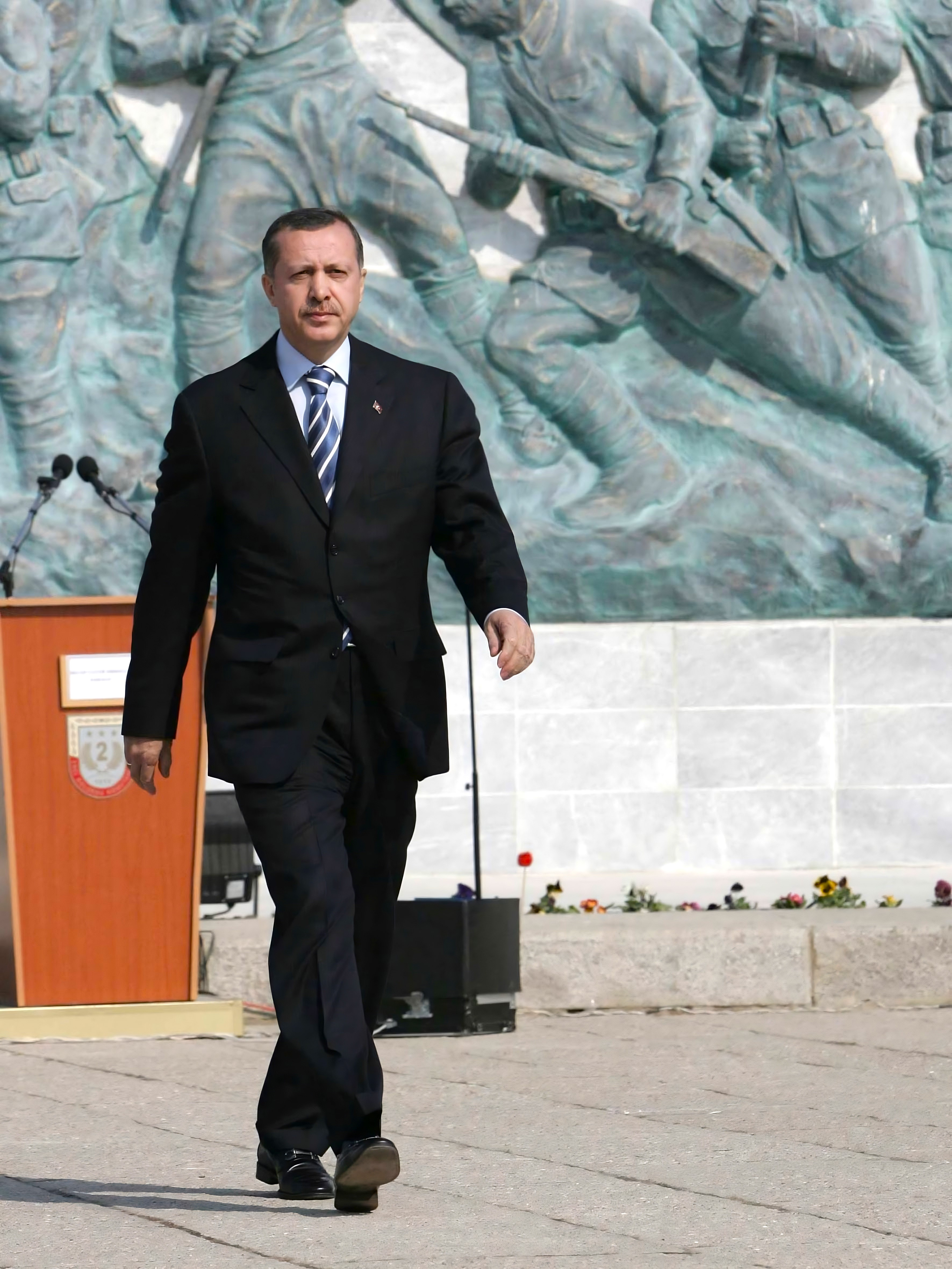
Recep Tayyip Erdoğan as Prime Minister at the Çanakkale, 2008

The public image of Recep Tayyip Erdoğan concerns the image of Recep Tayyip Erdoğan, current President of Turkey, among residents of Turkey and worldwide.

== Rating and polls ==
=== International polling ===
Opinions of Erdoğan from outside Turkey varies from region and time of his premiership or presidency. During the first years of his premiership in which Turkey reformed its law to comply with EU-accession talks, Erdoğan received favorable ratings in Europe, calling the reforms a "silent revolution". The refugee crisis originating from the Syrian civil war lowered the ratings of Erdoğan in Europe, while maintaining high support in the Arab world.

Results of the 2017 Gallup International poll Views of Recep Tayyip Erdoğan by country
Country polled	Favorable	Unfavorable	Net score
Vietnam	64%	8%	+56
Afghanistan	74%	20%	+54
Kosovo	57%	10%	+47
Indonesia	58%	13%	+45
Albania	65%	30%	+35
Bosnia & Herzegovina	61%	29%	+32
Bangladesh	53%	26%	+27
Pakistan	61%	34%	+27
Moldova	48%	22%	+26
Mexico	50%	27%	+23
Turkey	58%	36%	+22
Kazakhstan	42%	21%	+21
Azerbaijan	26%	7%	+19
North Macedonia	47%	29%	+18
Nigeria	43%	27%	+16
Iran	46%	30%	+16
Japan	21%	6%	+15
Ethiopia	29%	14%	+15
South Korea	28%	13%	+15
Romania	46%	32%	+14
Ukraine	52%	39%	+13
Ghana	28%	15%	+13
Russia	40%	30%	+10
India	19%	9%	+10
Colombia	35%	29%	+6
Brazil	29%	23%	+6
Ecuador	17%	12%	+5
South Africa	30%	27%	+3
Thailand	16%	13%	+3
Philippines	27%	25%	+2
Iraq	44%	52%	-8
Peru	14%	23%	-9
Argentina	16%	32%	-16
Hong Kong	19%	43%	-24
Poland	16%	42%	-26
United States	6%	33%	-27
Serbia	25%	55%	-30
Latvia	11%	50%	-39
United Kingdom	9%	53%	-44
France	13%	58%	-45
Ireland	10%	57%	-47
Italy	12%	59%	-47
Bulgaria	12%	65%	-53
Czech Republic	10%	63%	-53
Croatia	12%	66%	-54
Spain	8%	62%	-54
Sweden	6%	73%	-67
Netherlands	10%	79%	-69
Slovenia	9%	79%	-70
Austria	10%	63%	-73
Armenia	7%	81%	-74
Germany	10%	85%	-75
Greece	9%	88%	-79

=== Comparative polling ===
Erdoğan is the most popular world leader for Arab youths, according to the results of a poll, carried out by the Arab Barometer research network for BBC News Arabic. The survey polled the opinions of 25,000 youths across the Arab world on a wide variety of subjects.

Percentage positive view of leader
	Donald Trump	Vladimir Putin	Recep Tayyip Erdoğan
Algeria	12%	30%	66%
Egypt	15%	29%	15%
Iraq	16%	38%	38%
Jordan	6%	14%	77%
Lebanon	12%	36%	30%
Libya	14%	44%	22%
Morocco	14%	24%	61%
Palestine	6%	19%	72%
Sudan	21%	31%	78%
Tunisia	10%	32%	53%
Yemen	5%	11%	54%
Average	12%	28%	51%

== Perception ==
=== Antisemitism ===
Erdoğan referred to the Islamist ideologue and conspiracy theorist Necip Fazıl Kısakürek as his muse. Kısakürek was regarded by some analysts, such as Günther Jikeli and Kemal Silay, as the source of his views on Jews. Kısakürek's publications included the Turkish translation of The Protocols of the Elders of Zion and praise for industrialist Henry Ford's The International Jew, as well as a political program in which he wrote: "Chief among these treacherous and insidious elements to be cleansed are the Dönmeh and the Jews". In 1974, as president of the Beyoğlu Youth Group of the Islamist MSP Party, Erdoğan wrote, directed and played the lead role in a play titled "Mas-Kom-Ya" (Mason-Komünist-Yahudi [Mason-Communist-Jew]), which presented freemasonry, communism and Judaism as evil. A 2009 report issued by the Israeli Foreign Ministry, said that Erdoğan "indirectly incites and encourages" antisemitism. In 2013, Erdoğan was placed second on the Simon Wiesenthal Center's list of the year's top ten antisemitic personalities, after Erdoğan blamed the "interest rate lobby" as organizers of the mass protests against him in cities around the country in June 2013. In another quote that was regarded as antisemitic, he said "When the word ‘media’ is pronounced, Israel and Israel's administration comes to mind. They have the ability to manipulate it as they wish". He then claimed that not only the international press but also Turkish newspapers were run by Israel. During the campaign for the Turkish elections in June 2015, Erdoğan accused The New York Times of being represented by "Jewish capital" after foreign media outlets expressed concern over the corrosion of freedom of expression in Turkey.

As a younger man, in 1974, Erdoğan wrote, directed, and gave himself the lead role in the play Mas-Kom-Ya, which presented freemasonry, communism, and Judaism as world evils. The play features a Muslim factory worker, who sent his son to Europe where the son became influenced by the West, ultimately ending with a Jewish "agitator" posing as a Muslim Turk and inciting the workers against the factory owner, who dies; at one climactic moment, a devoutly Muslim character shouts "all evil regimes are inventions of Jews!"

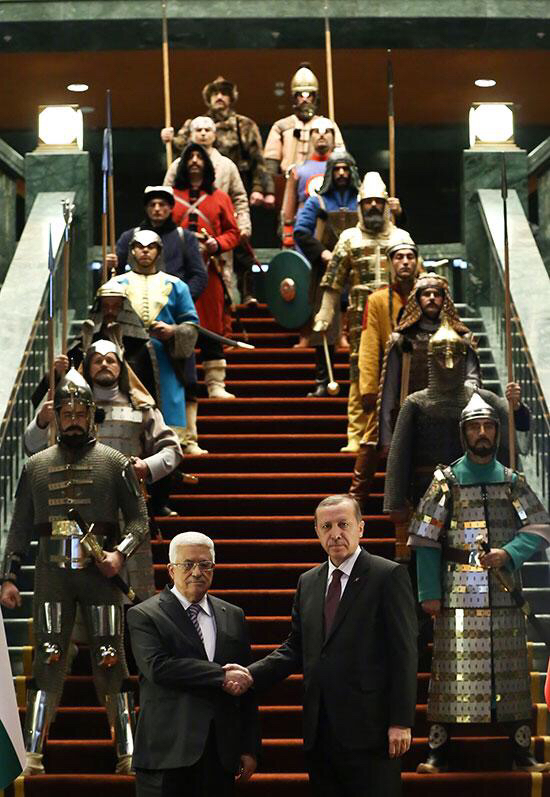
Erdoğan meeting Palestinian President Abbas in Erdoğan's presidential palace

When during a televised press conference he was asked if he believed a presidential system was possible in a unitary state. Erdoğan affirmed this and cited Nazi Germany as an example of how this is possible. However, the Turkish president’s office said that Erdoğan was not advocating a Hitler-style government when he called for a state system with a strong executive. Furthermore, that the Turkish president had declared the Holocaust, antisemitism and Islamophobia as crimes against humanity and that it was out of the question for him to cite Hitler's Germany as a good example.

In 2014, in response to the Soma mining disaster which killed 300 people, pro-Erdoğan Islamist media accused the "Jewish media" and Israel for culpability, and Erdoğan himself was filmed saying "why are you running away, spawn of Israel", in what was considered a "clear anti-Semitic slur" by Kemal Silay and Gunther Jikeli.

=== Neo-Ottomanism ===
As President, Erdoğan has overseen a revival of Ottoman tradition, greeting Palestinian President Mahmoud Abbas with an Ottoman-style ceremony in the new presidential palace, with guards dressed in costumes representing founders of 16 Great Turkish Empires in history. While serving as the Prime Minister of Turkey, Erdoğan's AKP made references to the Ottoman era during election campaigns, such as calling their supporters 'grandsons of Ottomans' (Osmanlı torunu). This proved controversial, since it was perceived to be an open attack against the republican nature of modern Turkey founded by Mustafa Kemal Atatürk. In 2015, Erdoğan made a statement in which he endorsed the old Ottoman term külliye to refer to university campuses rather than the standard Turkish word kampüs. And in 2016, when Erdoğan was making a speech about the 2016 Turkish coup d'état attempt, he used the Ottoman term vilayet multiple times to refer to provinces rather than the standard Turkish word since the 1920s, il. Many critics have thus accused Erdoğan of wanting to become an Ottoman sultan and abandon the secular and democratic credentials of the Republic. When pressed on this issue in January 2015, Erdoğan denied these claims and said that he would aim to be more like Queen Elizabeth II of the United Kingdom rather than like an Ottoman sultan.

== Anti-smoking activism ==
He is a well known anti-smoking activist, and often approaches people he sees smoking aiming for them to quit it. During his international journey to the 77th United Nations assembly he collected a cigarette pack of a smoker in the Central Park in New York, and Daily Sabah also reported that he compelled the Foreign Minister of Bulgaria Daniel Mitov to quit smoking during the NATO summit in Warsaw, Poland. Erdoğan usually demands the smoker to sign the cigarette package he carries, and following deliver it to him. In 2009 his Government passed a law which prohibits smoking in public places and in 2010, he was awarded the "WHO Director-General Special Recognition Award" for his anti-smoking activism. On occasion of the Turkish Quit Smoking Day in 2016, an exhibition with the cigarette boxes he had collected so far was displayed at the Presidential Palace.
