= Opinion polling for the June 2015 Turkish general election =

In the leadup to the June 2015 general election, various organisations carry out opinion polling to gauge voting intention. Results of such polls are displayed in this article.

The results tend to vary widely, as described in opinion polls in Turkey.

== Election poll results ==
=== Graphical summary ===
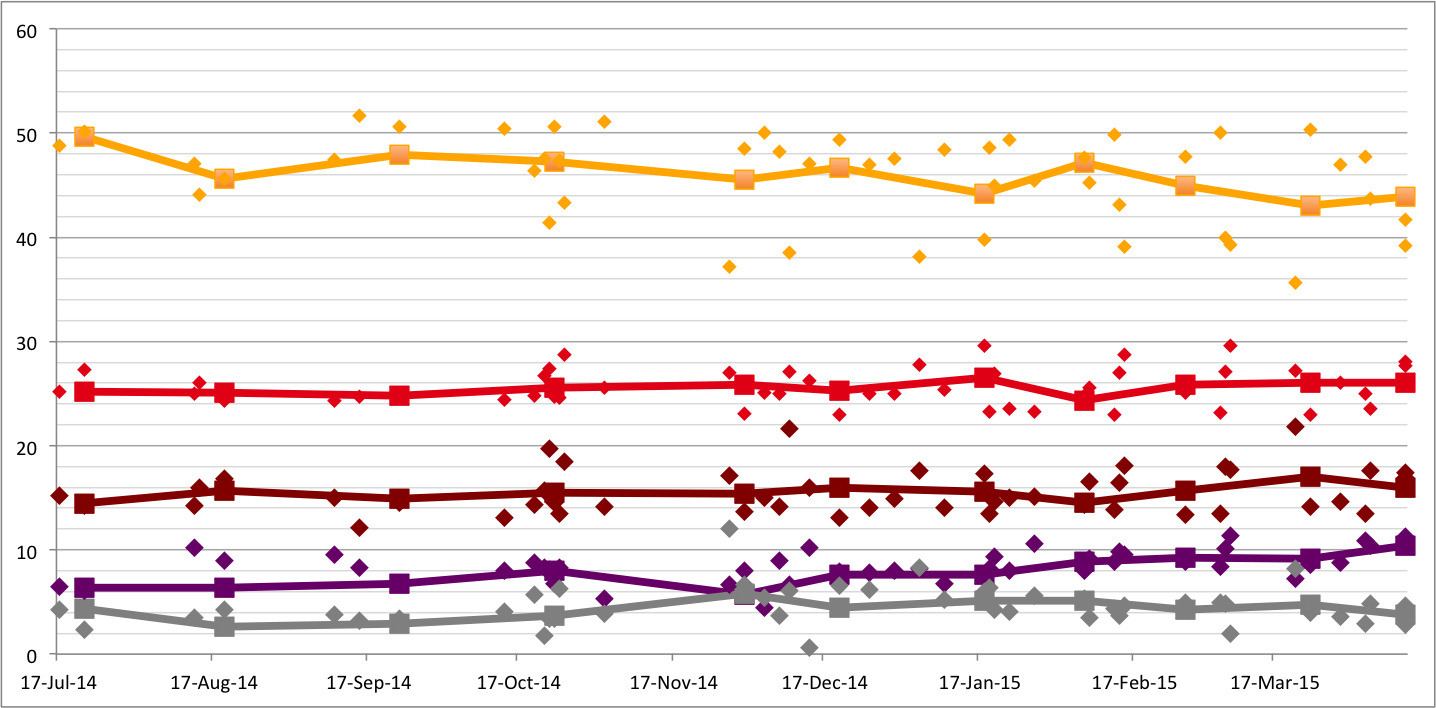
Opinion polling for the 2015 general election

=== Poll results ===
Poll results are listed in the table below in reverse chronological order, showing the most recent first, and using the date the survey's fieldwork was done, as opposed to the date of publication. (Note that, pre 2015 results only indicate the last date of the survey's fieldwork, and not the whole interval.) If such date is unknown, the date of publication is given instead. For the highest percentage figure in each polling survey, the background is shaded in the leading party's colour. The lead column on the right shows the percentage-point difference between the two parties with the highest figures. When a specific poll does not show a data figure for a party, the party's cell corresponding to that poll is shown empty.

=== 2015 ===
Light red denotes polls that were released after the polling ban came into effect, thereby violating Turkish electoral law.

| Date | Pollster | Sample | AKP | CHP | MHP | HDP | ANAPAR | Others | Lead |
|---|---|---|---|---|---|---|---|---|---|
| 7 Jun | Election results Domestic vote only | – | 40.7 | 25.1 | 16.5 | 13.0 | 0.1 | 4.6 | 15.6 |
| 2 Jun | Gezici | 4,860 | 38.5 | 28.5 | 16.5 | 12.5 | – | 3.0 | 10.0 |
| 30 May – 1 Jun | ORC | 3,850 | 46.0 | 25.3 | 15.5 | 9.0 | – | 4.2 | 20.7 |
| 30 – 31 May | Konda | 3,543 | 41.0 | 27.8 | 14.8 | 12.6 | – | 3.8 | 13.2 |
| 28 May | A pre-election ban on opinion polling comes into effect, ten days before polling day | | | | | | | | |
| 27 May | ANAR | – | 40.5 | 26.0 | 17.0 | 11.0 | – | 5.5 | 14.5 |
| 27 May | Aksoy | – | 42.6 | 26.2 | 16.2 | 10.6 | – | 4.2 | 16.4 |
| 18 – 26 May | MAK | 2,155 | 43.6 | 24.9 | 16.4 | 9.9 | – | 5.2 | 18.7 |
| 25 May | SONAR | 3,000 | 41.0 | 26.0 | 18.1 | 10.4 | – | 4.5 | 15.0 |
| 23 – 24 May | Gezici | 4,860 | 39.3 | 28.5 | 17.2 | 12.4 | – | 2.6 | 10.8 |
| 21 – 24 May | Andy-Ar | 4,166 | 41.9 | 25.8 | 16.0 | 10.7 | – | 5.6 | 16.1 |
| 18 – 24 May | KamuAR | 5,223 | 35.3 | 27.9 | 23.1 | 7.7 | – | 6.0 | 7.4 |
| 16 – 24 May | Denge | 11,859 | 44.6 | 25.5 | 16.1 | 10.5 | – | 3.3 | 19.1 |
| 17 – 23 May | Politics | 4,200 | 45.2 | 26.3 | 15.4 | 9.6 | – | 3.5 | 18.9 |
| 11 – 22 May | SAMER | 4,150 | 43.3 | 27.1 | 15.3 | 11.3 | – | 3.0 | 16.2 |
| 15 – 21 May | Vera | 1,509 | 43.5 | 27.1 | 16.0 | 9.6 | – | 3.9 | 16.4 |
| 21 May | Konda | – | 40.5 | 28.7 | 14.4 | 11.5 | – | 4.9 | 11.8 |
| 15 – 20 May | AKAM | 2,164 | 38.9 | 28.1 | 17.6 | 11.8 | – | 3.6 | 10.8 |
| 8 – 11 May | MetroPoll | 2,976 | 42.8 | 27.0 | 17.1 | 9.2 | – | 3.9 | 15.8 |
| 9 – 10 May | Gezici | 4,860 | 38.2 | 30.1 | 17.1 | 10.5 | – | 4.1 | 8.1 |
| 6 – 7 May | CHP | 1,618 | 39.3 | 28.1 | 17.8 | 10.3 | – | 4.6 | 11.2 |
| 4 – 7 May | ORC | 2,450 | 47.5 | 23.9 | 15.0 | 8.1 | – | 5.5 | 23.6 |
| 3 – 7 May | Denge | 5,073 | 45.6 | 25.5 | 15.1 | 9.5 | – | 4.3 | 20.1 |
| 2 – 7 May | Benenson SG | – | 39.0 | 31.6 | 14.7 | 10.5 | – | 4.2 | 7.4 |
| 30 Apr–7 May | Konsensus | 1,500 | 43.9 | 26.7 | 15.8 | 9.7 | – | 3.9 | 17.2 |
| 1 – 5 May | AKAM | 2,262 | 38.3 | 27.3 | 18.1 | 11.8 | – | 4.5 | 11.0 |
| 3 May | The Nationalist Movement Party (MHP) announces their manifesto | | | | | | | | |
| 24 – 27 Apr | AKAM | 3,214 | 38.1 | 28.1 | 17.8 | 12.6 | – | 3.4 | 10.0 |
| 20 – 27 Apr | KamuAR | 4,382 | 36.2 | 26.7 | 22.4 | 6.7 | – | 8.0 | 9.5 |
| 20 – 26 Apr | Gezici | 4,860 | 38.1 | 28.5 | 18.0 | 11.0 | – | 4.4 | 9.6 |
| 18 – 25 Apr | SONAR | 3,086 | 43.0 | 26.1 | 17.2 | 9.6 | – | 4.1 | 16.9 |
| 18 – 25 Apr | MAK | 5,400 | 45.15 | 24.79 | 15.25 | 9.15 | – | 5.66 | 20.36 |
| 21 Apr | The Peoples' Democratic Party (HDP) announces their manifesto | | | | | | | | |
| 18 – 21 Apr | MetroPoll | 2,824 | 42.5 | 26.4 | 17.6 | 10.2 | – | 3.3 | 16.1 |
| 19 Apr | The Republican People's Party (CHP) announces their manifesto | | | | | | | | |
| 11–17 Apr | AKAM | 5,160 | 40.7 | 25.5 | 18.0 | 11.4 | – | 4.4 | 15.2 |
| 15 Apr | The Justice and Development Party (AKP) announces their manifesto | | | | | | | | |
| 9–13 Apr | ORC | 4,200 | 48.3 | 23.7 | 14.4 | 8.9 | – | 4.7 | 24.6 |
| 9–12 Apr | Gezici | – | 39.2 | 28.1 | 16.9 | 11.3 | – | 4.6 | 11.1 |
| 12 Apr | MetroPoll | 2,500 | 41.7 | 27.7 | 17.4 | 10.4 | – | 2.8 | 14.0 |
| 4 Apr | Andy-Ar | – | 43.7 | 23.5 | 17.6 | 10.4 | – | 4.8 | 20.2 |
| 4 Apr | GENAR | – | 47.7 | 25.0 | 13.5 | 10.9 | – | 2.9 | 22.7 |
| 30 Mar | Denge | – | 47.0 | 26.0 | 14.6 | 8.8 | – | 3.6 | 21.0 |
| 18–24 Mar | ORC | 3,178 | 50.3 | 23.0 | 14.1 | 8.6 | – | 4.0 | 27.3 |
| 16 Mar | MAK | 5,000 | 47.7 | 25.3 | 14.2 | 9.2 | – | 3.7 | 22.4 |
| 12–21 Mar | KamuAR | 8,173 | 35.6 | 27.2 | 21.8 | 7.2 | – | 8.2 | 8.4 |
| 7–8 Mar | Gezici | 4,860 | 39.3 | 29.6 | 17.7 | 11.4 | – | 2.0 | 9.7 |
| 4–7 Mar | SONAR | 3,000 | 40.0 | 27.1 | 18.0 | 10.1 | – | 4.8 | 12.9 |
| 4–7 Mar | ORC | 3,160 | 50.0 | 23.2 | 13.5 | 8.4 | – | 4.9 | 26.8 |
| 27 Feb | GENAR | 5,202 | 47.7 | 25.1 | 13.4 | 8.9 | – | 4.9 | 22.6 |
| 15 Feb | The Workers' Party (İP) is succeeded by the Patriotic Party (VP) | | | | | | | | |
| 14–15 Feb | Gezici | 3,840 | 39.1 | 28.7 | 18.1 | 9.5 | 0.1 | 4.5 | 10.7 |
| 11–14 Feb | Metropoll | 2,694 | 43.1 | 27.0 | 16.4 | 9.8 | – | 3.7 | 16.1 |
| 10–14 Feb | ORC | 4,650 | 49.8 | 23.0 | 13.9 | 8.9 | – | 4.4 | 26.8 |
| 3–8 Feb | Andy-AR | 2,263 | 45.2 | 25.6 | 16.5 | 9.2 | – | 3.5 | 19.6 |
| 3–8 Feb | MAK | 5,454 | 47.6 | 24.8 | 14.3 | 8.0 | – | 5.3 | 22.8 |
| Jan | KONDA | ? | 45.4 | 23.3 | 15.1 | 10.6 | – | 5.6 | 22.1 |
| 26 Jan | MPs Ercan Cengiz and Birgül Ayman Güler both resign from the CHP, with Cengiz joining the Centre Party | | | | | | | | |
| 19–23 Jan | Pollmark | 5,000 | 49.4 | 23.5 | 15.0 | 8.0 | – | 4.1 | 25.9 |
| 17–20 Jan | Metropoll | 2,759 | 44.9 | 26.9 | 14.6 | 9.3 | – | 4.3 | 18.0 |
| 15–19 Jan | ORC | 1,720 | 48.6 | 23.3 | 13.5 | 8.2 | – | 6.4 | 25.3 |
| 17–18 Jan | Gezici | 3,600 | 39.8 | 29.6 | 17.3 | 7.3 | 0.4 | 5.6 | 10.2 |
| 12 Jan | SONAR | 3,000 | 38.1 | 27.8 | 17.6 | 8.2 | 3.9 | 4.4 | 10.3 |
| 5–10 Jan | MAK | 5,400 | 48.4 | 25.4 | 14.0 | 6.8 | – | 5.2 | 23.0 |
| 1–10 Jan | TÜSİAR | 4,153 | 51.4 | 22.6 | 14.2 | 8.0 | – | 3.8 | 28.8 |
| Date | Pollster | Sample | | | | | | | Lead |
| Date | Pollster | Sample | AKP | CHP | MHP | HDP | ANAPAR | Others | Lead |

=== 2014 ===
| Date | Pollster | Sample | AKP | CHP | MHP | HDP | ANAPAR | Others | Lead |
|---|---|---|---|---|---|---|---|---|---|
| Dec | KONDA | ? | 47.5 | 25.0 | 14.9 | 8.0 | – | 4.6 | 22.5 |
| 24–31 Dec | ANAR | 5,190 | 47.0 | 25.0 | 14.0 | 7.8 | – | 6.2 | 22.0 |
| 15–20 Dec | ORC | 3,860 | 49.4 | 23.0 | 13.1 | 7.9 | – | 6.6 | 26.4 |
| 4–14 Dec | KHU (Note: Poll identifies 10.6% of respondents as non-voters.) | 1,000 | 47.1 | 26.2 | 16.0 | 10.2 | – | 0.6 | 20.9 |
| 14 Dec | KamuAR | 4,177 | 38.5 | 27.1 | 21.6 | 6.7 | – | 6.1 | 12.1 |
| 4–8 Dec | GENAR | 5,115 | 48.2 | 25.0 | 14.1 | 9.0 | – | 3.7 | 23.2 |
| 1–5 Dec | MAK | 10,800 | 50.0 | 25.1 | 15.0 | 4.5 | – | 5.4 | 24.9 |
| 1 Dec 2014 | ORC | 3,100 | 48.5 | 23.1 | 13.7 | 8.0 | – | 6.7 | 25.4 |
| 28 Nov 2014 | SONAR | 3,025 | 37.17 | 27.01 | 17.13 | 6.69 | 8.04 | 3.96 | 10.16 |
| 14 Nov 2014 | Ankara MP Emine Ülker Tarhan resigns from the CHP and establishes the Anatolia Party (ANAPAR) | | | | | | | | |
| 3 Nov 2014 | MAK | 10,800 | 51.1 | 25.6 | 14.1 | 5.3 | | 3.9 | 25.5 |
| 25 Oct 2014 | Gezici | 5,292 | 43.3 | 28.7 | 18.5 | – | | – | 14.6 |
| 25 Oct 2014 | ORC | 11,353 | 47.3 | 24.6 | 13.5 | 8.3 | | 6.3 | 23.7 |
| 24 Oct 2014 | Optimar | 5,200 | 50.6 | 24.7 | 14.5 | 6.8 | | 3.4 | 25.9 |
| 23 Oct 2014 | Gezici | 3,292 | 41.4 | 27.4 | 19.7 | 8.1 | | 3.4 | 14.0 |
| 22 Oct 2014 | MetroPoll | 2,752 | 47.5 | 26.7 | 15.7 | 8.3 | | 1.8 | 20.8 |
| 20 Oct 2014 | Andy-Ar | 2,037 | 46.4 | 24.8 | 14.3 | 8.8 | | 5.7 | 21.6 |
| 14 Oct 2014 | Pollmark | 5,071 | 50.4 | 24.4 | 13.1 | 8.0 | | 4.1 | 26.0 |
| 23 Sep 2014 | Optimar | 5,200 | 50.6 | 24.7 | 14.5 | 6.8 | | 3.4 | 25.9 |
| 20 Sep 2014 | Ankara MP Emrehan Halıcı resigns from the CHP and establishes the Electronic Democracy Party (eP) | | | | | | | | |
| 15 Sep 2014 | ANAR | 5,200 | 51.7 | 24.7 | 12.1 | 8.3 | | 3.2 | 27.0 |
| 10 Sep 2014 | ORC | 2,312 | 47.4 | 24.3 | 15.0 | 9.5 | | 3.8 | 23.1 |
| 28 Aug 2014 | Ahmet Davutoğlu is elected AKP leader and becomes the 26th Prime Minister of Turkey | | | | | | | | |
| 19 Aug 2014 | Andy-Ar | 1,897 | 45.6 | 24.3 | 16.8 | 9.0 | | 4.3 | 21.3 |
| 14 Aug 2014 | MetroPoll | – | 44.1 | 26.0 | 16.0 | – | | – | 18.1 |
| 13 Aug 2014 | ORC | 2,750 | 47.1 | 25.0 | 14.2 | 10.2 | | 3.5 | 22.1 |
| 10 Aug 2014 | Recep Tayyip Erdoğan is elected President with 51.79% of the vote | | | | | | | | |
| 22 Jul 2014 | TÜSİAR | 4,123 | 50.1 | 27.3 | 14.2 | 6.1 | | 2.3 | 22.8 |
| 17 Jul 2014 | Andy-AR | 3,216 | 48.8 | 25.2 | 15.2 | 6.5 | | 4.3 | 23.6 |
| 28 Apr 2014 | MAK | 10,440 | 50.1 | 23.0 | 14.0 | 6.5 | | 6.5 | 27.1 |
| 30 May 2014 | Gezici | 3,292 | 44.5 | 27.5 | 18.6 | 8.1 | | 1.3 | 17.0 |
| 6 May 2014 | ORC | 5,100 | 49.1 | 24.8 | 16.3 | 6.8 | | 3.0 | 24.3 |
| 30 Mar 2014 | 2014 local elections | – | 42.9 | 26.3 | 17.8 | 6.3 | | 6.7 | 16.6 |
| 18 Mar 2014 | SONAR | 15,948 | 39.0 | 30.0 | – | – | | – | 9.0 |
| 17 Mar 2014 | AKP | – | 29.7 | 33.3 | 21.3 | 7.6 | | 8.1 | 3.6 |
| 28 Feb 2014 | Gezici | 5,292 | 39.7 | 31.4 | 18.2 | 7.1 | | 3.6 | 8.3 |
| Date | Pollster | Sample | | | | | | | Lead |
| Date | Pollster | Sample | AKP | CHP | MHP | HDP | ANAPAR | Others | Lead |

=== 2013 ===
| Date | Pollster | Sample | AKP | CHP | MHP | HDP | ANAPAR | Others | Lead |
|---|---|---|---|---|---|---|---|---|---|
| 17 Dec 2013 | A ₺100bn government corruption scandal occurs and Fethullah Gülen withdraws support for the AKP | | | | | | | | |
| 22 Sep 2013 | Gezici | 5,292 | 42.5 | 27.3 | 18.1 | 9.5 | | 2.6 | 15.2 |
| 1 Sep 2013 | ORC | 3,100 | 49.2 | 26.5 | 14.9 | 6.4 | | 3.0 | 22.7 |
| 24 Jun 2013 | Konsensus | 1,500 | 47.1 | 30.9 | 14.6 | 4.6 | | 2.8 | 16.2 |
| 30 May 2013 | Protests break out against the alleged authoritarianism of Recep Tayyip Erdoğan's government | | | | | | | | |
| 13 Apr 2013 | Gezici | 2,646 | 44.1 | 27.5 | 17.2 | 9.2 | | 2.0 | 16.6 |
| 6 Apr 2013 | GENAR | 3,000 | 50.2 | 25.2 | 13.7 | 6.4 | | 4.5 | 25.0 |
| 1 Jan 2013 | O&A | 2,614 | 44.6 | 30.2 | 15.8 | 5.3 | | 4.1 | 14.4 |
| Date | Pollster | Sample | | | | | | | Lead |
| Date | Pollster | Sample | AKP | CHP | MHP | HDP | ANAPAR | Others | Lead |

=== 2012 ===
| Date | Pollster | Sample | AKP | CHP | MHP | HDP | ANAPAR | Others | Lead |
|---|---|---|---|---|---|---|---|---|---|
| 30 Dec 2012 | ORC | – | 48.2 | 27.4 | 14.1 | 5.5 | | 4.8 | 20.8 |
| 12 Dec 2012 | Konsensus | 1,501 | 50.7 | 27.7 | 12.8 | 6.4 | | 2.4 | 23.0 |
| 24 Nov 2012 | Gezici | 8,460 | 45.9 | 26.1 | 17.1 | 7.9 | | 3.0 | 19.8 |
| 15 Nov 2012 | SONAR | 2,220 | 47.3 | 25.2 | 15.2 | 7.1 | | 5.2 | 22.1 |
| 12 Oct 2012 | GENAR | – | 51.2 | 26.5 | 12.4 | 7.3 | | 2.6 | 24.7 |
| 6 Sep 2012 | Gezici | 6,460 | 46.3 | 26.4 | 17.7 | – | | – | 25.6 |
| 27 Aug 2012 | Andy-Ar | 3,251 | 49.7 | 20.7 | 17.1 | 8.5 | | 3.9 | 29.0 |
| 11 Jul 2012 | SDE | 2,155 | 49.0 | 25.9 | 14.1 | 6.3 | | 4.7 | 23.1 |
| 30 May 2012 | ORC | 5,000 | 51.7 | 24.7 | 12.4 | 7.0 | | 4.2 | 27.0 |
| 31 Apr 2012 | ORC | 5,670 | 54.7 | 19.3 | 15.8 | 6.5 | | 3.7 | 35.4 |
| 13 Apr 2012 | GENAR | 2,220 | 51.3 | 25.7 | 13.2 | 5.1 | | 4.7 | 25.6 |
| 30 Mar 2012 | ORC | 5,000 | 55.2 | 19.0 | 14.4 | 6.1 | | 5.3 | 36.2 |
| 3 Mar 2012 | Konsensus | 1,505 | 51.7 | 27.7 | 13.3 | 5.6 | | 1.7 | 24.0 |
| Date | Pollster | Sample | | | | | | | Lead |
| Date | Pollster | Sample | AKP | CHP | MHP | HDP | ANAPAR | Others | Lead |

=== 2011 ===
| Date | Pollster | Sample | AKP | CHP | MHP | BDP | ANAPAR | Others | Lead |
|---|---|---|---|---|---|---|---|---|---|
| 19 Dec 2011 | SONAR | 3,000 | 54.8 | 19.5 | 16.1 | 6.2 | | 3.3 | 35.3 |
| 18 Dec 2011 | Konsensus | 1,500 | 50.2 | 27.1 | 12.0 | 5.8 | | 4.9 | 23.1 |
| 12 Jun 2011 | 2011 election | – | 49.83 | 25.98 | 13.01 | 5.67 | | 11.18 | 23.85 |
| Date | Pollster | Sample | | | | | | | Lead |
| Date | Pollster | Sample | AKP | CHP | MHP | BDP | ANAPAR | Others | Lead |

== Parliamentary seat predictions ==
| Date | Pollster | Sample | AKP | CHP | MHP | HDP | Majority | Notes |
|---|---|---|---|---|---|---|---|---|
| 7 June | Election results | – | 258 / 550 | 132 / 550 | 80 / 550 | 80 / 550 | Hung | |
| ? | Metropoll | – | 260 / 550 | 142 / 550 | 81 / 550 | 67 / 550 | Hung | Poll applied to election simulator in http://secimharitasi.com/milletvekili-dagilimi-hesapla |
| 2 – 3 June | A&G Research | 2,976 | 265 / 550 | 138 / 550 | 78 / 550 | 69 / 550 | Hung | Poll applied to election simulator in http://secimharitasi.com/milletvekili-dagilimi-hesapla |
| 2 June | Gezici | 4,860 | 242 / 550 | 151 / 550 | 85 / 550 | 72 / 550 | Hung | Poll applied to election simulator in http://secimharitasi.com/milletvekili-dagilimi-hesapla |
| 2 June | SONAR | – | 257 / 550 | 134 / 550 | 100 / 550 | 59 / 550 | Hung | Poll applied to election simulator in http://secimharitasi.com/milletvekili-dagilimi-hesapla |
| 30 – 31 May | KONDA | 3,543 | 261 / 550 | 144 / 550 | 73 / 550 | 72 / 550 | Hung | Poll applied to election simulator in http://secimharitasi.com/milletvekili-dagilimi-hesapla |
| 27 May | ANAR | – | 263 / 550 | 136 / 550 | 89 / 550 | 62 / 550 | Hung | Poll applied to election simulator in http://secimharitasi.com/milletvekili-dagilimi-hesapla |
| 25 May | SONAR | 3,000 | 257 / 550 | 134 / 550 | 100 / 550 | 59 / 550 | Hung | Poll applied to election simulator in http://secimharitasi.com/milletvekili-dagilimi-hesapla |
| 23 – 24 May | Gezici | 4,860 | 257 / 550 | 134 / 550 | 86 / 550 | 70 / 550 | Hung | Poll applied to election simulator in http://secimharitasi.com/milletvekili-dagilimi-hesapla |
| 21 – 24 May | Andy-Ar | 4,166 | 271 / 550 | 136 / 550 | 83 / 550 | 60 / 550 | Hung | Poll applied to election simulator in http://secimharitasi.com/milletvekili-dagilimi-hesapla |
| 21 May | Konda | – | 260 / 550 | 149 / 550 | 71 / 550 | 70 / 550 | Hung | Poll applied to election simulator in http://secimharitasi.com/milletvekili-dagilimi-hesapla |
| 9 – 10 May | Gezici | 1,500 | 236 / 550 | 163 / 550 | 92 / 550 | 59 / 550 | Hung | Poll applied to election simulator in http://secimharitasi.com/milletvekili-dagilimi-hesapla |
| 6 – 7 May | CHP | 1,618 | 232 / 550 | 151 / 550 | 104 / 550 | 63 / 550 | Hung | |
| 30 Apr–7 May | Konsensus | 1,500 | 277 / 550 | 138 / 550 | 75 / 550 | 60 / 550 | 4 | If the HDP surpasses the 10% threshold |
| 30 Apr–7 May | Konsensus | 1,500 | 331 / 550 | 142 / 550 | 77 / 550 | 0 / 550 | 112 | If the HDP falls below the 10% threshold |
| 24–27 Apr 2015 | AKAM | 3,124 | 238 / 550 | 142 / 550 | 100 / 550 | 68 / 550 | Hung | |
| 11–17 Apr 2015 | AKAM | 5,160 | 262 / 550 | 133 / 550 | 88 / 550 | 67 / 550 | Hung | Predicts 2 independent MPs (Hakan Şükür and Cemal Kaya) |
| 12 Apr 2015 | MetroPoll | 2,500 | 261 / 550 | 141 / 550 | 90 / 550 | 58 / 550 | Hung | |
| 24 Mar 2015 | ORC | 3,176 | 375 / 550 | 125 / 550 | 50 / 550 | 0 / 550 | 200 | Two-thirds majority |
| 11 Mar 2015 | SONAR | 3,000 | 243 / 550 | 133 / 550 | 116 / 550 | 58 / 550 | Hung | If the HDP surpasses the 10% threshold |
| 11 Mar 2015 | SONAR | 3,000 | 274 / 550 | 148 / 550 | 128 / 550 | 0 / 550 | Hung | If the HDP falls below the 10% threshold |
| 8 Mar 2015 | Gezici | 4,860 | 229 / 550 | 146 / 550 | 118 / 550 | 57 / 550 | Hung | |
| 12 Jun 2011 | 2011 election | – | 327 / 550 | 135 / 550 | 53 / 550 | 35 / 550 | 104 | |
| Date | Pollster | Sample | | | | | Majority | Notes |
| Date | Pollster | Sample | AKP | CHP | MHP | BDP | Majority | Notes |

== Diaspora ==
Turkish expats living abroad will have the ability to vote for the first time in a Turkish general election. The following table shows the results of polls conducted in different countries amongst Turkish expat voters.

| Date | Country | Pollster | Sample | AKP | CHP | MHP | HDP | ANAPAR | Others | Lead |
|---|---|---|---|---|---|---|---|---|---|---|
| 8–31 May 2015 | Overseas results | | – | 50.4 | 15.9 | 9.1 | 21.4 | 0.1 | 3.1 | 29.0 |
| 18–26 May 2015 | Germany; France; Netherlands; Belgium; Austria | MAK | 1,381; 294; 240; 130; 110 | 58.5 | 14.0 | 8.5 | 12.0 | – | 7.0 | 44.5 |
| 4–12 April 2015 | Germany | Ethno-Forschung | 3,000 | 60.8 | 10.1 | 11.9 | 17.2 | – | 0.0 | 43.6 |
| Date | Country | Pollster | Sample | | | | | | | Lead |
| Date | Country | Pollster | Sample | AKP | CHP | MHP | HDP | ANAPAR | Others | Lead |

== Polling on other issues ==
A range of opinion polling regarding several contemporary issues which may affect voter choice has also been conducted by several organisations. The results of these are listed below. Please note that some opinion polls may offer different means of wording questions, or may offer different options.

=== Government corruption scandal ===
The following table shows opinion polling for whether the 17–25 December 2014 corruption scandal is seen to be a genuine corruption probe, or a plot against the government.

| Date | Pollster | Sample | Corruption investigation | Coup plot | Both | Don't know |
|---|---|---|---|---|---|---|
| 14 Dec 2014 | KHU | 1,000 | 38.4 | 35.6 | – | 1.3 |
| 21 Jan 2014 | MetroPoll | 1,545 | 42.2 | 24.0 | 24.9 | 8.9 |

=== New presidential palace ===
The following table lists opinions on the construction of a new presidential palace, which has raised controversy due to its size, cost, location and legality.

| Date | Pollster | Sample | Approve | Disapprove | Don't know |
|---|---|---|---|---|---|
| 14 Dec 2014 | KHU | 1,000 | 37.5 | 48.0 | 14.5 |
| 14 Dec 2014 | KamuAR | 4,177 | 23.8 | 71.7 | 4.5 |
| 30 Nov 2014 | MetroPoll | 2,780 | 35.2 | 57.1 | 7.7 |

=== System of government ===
The AKP government support a presidential system of government as opposed to the current parliamentary system. Should they win above 330 seats in the next parliament, they have voiced intentions to place several proposed constitutional changes to a referendum, which may include the issue of which government system is used in Turkey. The following polls show the support for parliamentary, presidential and semi-presidential systems.

| Date | Pollster | Sample | Parliamentary | Presidential | Semi-presidential | Other/Don't know |
|---|---|---|---|---|---|---|
| 23 February 2015 | Gezici | 3,480 | 76.8 | 23.2 | – | – |
| 3 February 2015 | A&G | – | 70.0 | 30.0 | – | – |
| 14 Dec 2014 | KHU | 1,000 | 79.3 | 12.6 | 4.7 | 3.1 |
| August 2014 | MetroPOLL | – | 42.2 | 34.3 | – | 23.5 |
| May 2014 | MetroPOLL | – | 45.8 | 33.6 | – | 20.5 |
| May 2014 | MetroPOLL | – | 45.8 | 33.6 | – | 20.5 |
| August 2013 | MetroPOLL | – | 43.8 | 40.1 | – | 21.1 |
| 20 Jul 2013 | Bilgesam | 2,570 | 67.9 | 32.1 | – | – |
| June 2013 | MetroPOLL | – | 42.9 | 30.9 | – | 26.2 |
| April 2013 | MetroPOLL | – | 39.8 | 35.2 | – | 25.0 |
| 11 Mar 2013 | Varyans | 5,068 | 56.5 | 27.6 | 11.4 | 4.5 |
| December 2012 | MetroPOLL | – | 44.2 | 36.9 | – | 18.9 |
| 24 Nov 2012 | Gezici | 8,460 | 57.4 | 42.6 | – | – |
| 15 Nov 2012 | SONAR | 2,220 | 52.5 | 26.8 | – | 20.7 |
| June 2012 | MetroPOLL | – | 37.7 | 43.2 | – | 19.1 |
| February 2011 | A&G | 2,516 | 56.3 | 16.0 | 0.8 | 26.9 |

=== Economy ===
The following table lists opinions on how well the government have managed the Turkish economy.

| Date | Pollster | Sample | Approve | Disapprove | Don't know |
|---|---|---|---|---|---|
| 14 Dec 2014 | KHU | 1,000 | 30.0 | 44.4 | 25.6 |
| 30 Nov 2014 | MetroPoll | 2,780 | 40.2 | 54.4 | 5.5 |
| 31 Jul 2014 | Pew | 1,001 | 50.0 | 46.0 | 4.0 |
| 30 Mar 2012 | ORC | 5,000 | 71.6 | 28.4 | – |

=== Syrian Civil War ===
Being one of the hardest hit countries in terms of refugees due to the Syrian Civil War, the Turkish government's policy on Syrian refugees has created controversy, especially in the Hatay Province on the Turkish-Syrian border. The following table shows opinion polling on the support of the government in terms of their policy on Syria.

| Date | Pollster | Sample | Approve | Disapprove | Don't know |
|---|---|---|---|---|---|
| 14 Dec 2014 | KHU | 1,000 | 21.6 | 53.7 | 24.7 |
| 30 Nov 2014 | MetroPoll | 2,780 | 28.2 | 66.8 | 4.9 |
| 24 Nov 2012 | Gezici | 8,460 | 30.9 | 69.1 | – |
| 6 Sep 2012 | Gezici | 6,460 | 36.0 | 64.0 | – |
| 27 Aug 2012 | Andy-Ar | 3,251 | 18.3 | 67.1 | 14.6 |

=== Foreign policy ===
The following table shows opinion polling for the approval of the government's foreign policy.

| Date | Pollster | Sample | Approve | Disapprove | Don't know |
|---|---|---|---|---|---|
| 14 Dec 2014 | KHU | 1,000 | 32.6 | 41.4 | 26.0 |
| 14 Jul 2014 | MetroPoll | 2,268 | 28.0 | 57.7 | 7.4 |
| 1 Sep 2013 | ORC | 3,100 | 59.2 | 30.2 | 10.4 |
| 30 Mar 2012 | ORC | 5,000 | 61.2 | 38.8 | – |

=== PKK peace process ===
The government began a peace process with Kurdish separatist militants in 2013, with the PKK militant organisation beginning a withdrawal of insurgents as a result. However, numerous casualties despite the ceasefire as well as the unclear terms of the ceasefire have generated controversy. The following table shows opinion polling on the approval of the government's solution process.

| Date | Pollster | Sample | Approve | Disapprove | Partially | Don't know |
|---|---|---|---|---|---|---|
| 25 Dec 2014 | ORC | 3,860 | 59.5 | 40.5 | – | – |
| 14 Dec 2014 | KHU | 1,000 | 25.0 | 47.7 | 27.3 | – |
| 14 Dec 2014 | KamuAR | 4,177 | 29.6 | 51.7 | 13.9 | 4.8 |
| 30 Nov 2014 | MetroPoll | 2,780 | 29.1 | 61.4 | – | 9.6 |
| 6 Sep 2012 | Gezici | 6,460 | 40.7 | 59.3 | – | – |

=== Judicial independence ===
Following the 2013 government corruption scandal and the subsequent crackdown by the government on the judiciary, the independence of the judiciary has been a key issue of concern for the political opposition and the European Union. The following table shows opinion polling on whether or not the judiciary is independent.

| Date | Pollster | Sample | Independent | Not independent | Don't know |
|---|---|---|---|---|---|
| 14 Dec 2014 | KHU | 1,000 | 24.2 | 58.7 | 17.1 |
| 14 Dec 2014 | KamuAR | 4,177 | 27.5 | 47.2 | 25.3 |
| 28 Feb 2014 | Gezici | 5,292 | 27.2 | 72.8 | – |

=== Alevi rights ===
Alevi Muslims are the main religious minority in Turkey. The table below shows opinion polling on whether Alevi citizens should have greater rights, such as granting official status to their place of worship, the Cemevi.

| Date | Pollster | Sample | Approve | Disapprove | Don't know |
|---|---|---|---|---|---|
| 14 Dec 2014 | KamuAR | 4,177 | 58.3 | 15.4 | 26.3 |

=== Islamic State of Iraq and the Levant and Kobanî ===
The following table shows the approval for the government's policy on tackling the Islamic State of Iraq and the Levant in Iraq and Syria. This particularly centres around the situation in the border town of Kobanî, where Turkish inaction caused deadly protests, as well as the government's permission for Kurdish Peshmerga forces to cross Turkish territory to fight in Kobanî.

| Date | Pollster | Sample | Approve | Disapprove | Don't know |
|---|---|---|---|---|---|
| 14 Dec 2014 | KHU | 1,000 | 19.1 | 51.6 | 29.3 |
| 14 Dec 2014 | KamuAR | 4,177 | 24.0 | 52.9 | 23.1 |

=== Workers' rights ===
The following table shows opinion polling for whether workers' rights are sufficient. This issue rose to prominence after 301 miners were killed in Soma, Manisa after a mine collapsed. Subsequent deaths in the construction and mining sector have also caused debate on workers' rights in Turkey.

| Date | Pollster | Sample | Sufficient | Insufficient | Don't know |
|---|---|---|---|---|---|
| 14 Dec 2014 | KHU | 1,000 | 24.0 | 52.9 | 23.1 |
| 14 Dec 2014 | KamuAR | 4,177 | 7.2 | 89.0 | 3.8 |

=== Gezi protests ===
The following table shows opinion polling for the protests that took place in the summer of 2013 against the construction plan of a shopping mall in Taksim Gezi Park.

| Date | Pollster | Sample | Approve | Disapprove | Don't know |
|---|---|---|---|---|---|
| 31 Jul 2014 | Pew | 1,001 | 49,0 | 40,0 | 11,0 |

== Leadership approval ratings ==
The following tables show the approval ratings for key politicians in Turkey, most of whom will be seeking re-election in the 2015 general election. The tick icon indicates approval, the X icon indicates disapproval, while N/O indicates no opinion.

| Date | Pollster | Sample size |
|---|---|---|
| Apr 2015 | BSG | – |
| 25 Dec 2014 | ORC | 3,860 |
| 14 Dec 2014 | KHU | 1,000 |
| 5 Dec 2014 | MAK | 10,800 |
| 30 Nov 2014 | MetroPoll | 2,780 |
| 25 Jun 2014 | Konsensus | 1,500 |
| 23 Feb 2014 | Konsensus | 1,504 |
| 12 Dec 2012 | Konsensus | 1,501 |
| 11 Jul 2012 | SDE | 2,155 |

Recep Tayyip Erdoğan
| | | N/O |
|---|---|---|
| 42 | 56 | 2 |
| 57.4 | 37.0 | 5.6 |
| 43.5 | 35.9 | 20.6 |
| 70.5 | 19.5 | 10.0 |
| 45.6 | 50.2 | 4.2 |
| 52 | 42 | 7 |
| 44.2 | 47.5 | 8.3 |
| 46.9 | 43.9 | 9.2 |
| 52.5 | 41.3 | 6.2 |

Ahmet Davutoğlu
| | | N/O |
|---|---|---|
| 40 | 58 | 2 |
| 50.5 | 44.2 | 5.3 |
| 33.8 | 42.2 | 24.0 |
| 48.5 | 21.5 | 30.0 |
| 43.3 | 49.6 | 7.1 |
| – | – | – |
| – | – | – |
| – | – | – |
| – | – | – |

Kemal Kılıçdaroğlu
| | | N/O |
|---|---|---|
| – | – | – |
| – | – | – |
| 13.0 | 70.2 | 16.8 |
| 21.1 | – | – |
| 18.9 | 76.8 | 4.2 |
| 23 | 70 | 8 |
| 32.4 | 56.1 | 11.5 |
| 27.5 | – | – |
| 29.5 | 63.0 | 7.5 |

Devlet Bahçeli
| | | N/O |
|---|---|---|
| – | – | – |
| – | – | – |
| 9.8 | 70.4 | 19.8 |
| 9.0 | – | – |
| 15.8 | 79.5 | 4.6 |
| 23 | 66 | 11 |
| 19.3 | 67.9 | 12.8 |
| – | – | – |
| – | – | – |

Selahattin Demirtaş
| | | N/O |
|---|---|---|
| – | – | – |
| – | – | – |
| 17.2 | 73.0 | 9.8 |
| 5.0 | – | – |
| 11.8 | 82.1 | 6.0 |
| 13 | 83 | 4 |
| 15.0 | 77.2 | 7.8 |
| – | – | – |
| – | 79.7 | – |

== See also ==
- Opinion polls in Turkey
