= Anatolia Party =

Anatolia Party Anadolu Partisi
- President: Emine Ülker Tarhan
- Deputy President: Yunus Yunusoğlu
- Founded: 14 November 2014
- Dissolved: 21 December 2015
- Split from: Republican People's Party
- Headquarters: Ankara
- Ideology: Social democracy Environmentalism; Secularism/Laicism; Progressivism; Feminism; Republicanism; Civic nationalism
- Political position: Centre-left
- Colors: Blue, orange & yellow

The Anatolia Party (Turkish: Anadolu Partisi, abbreviated AnaParti) was a political party in Turkey led by Emine Ülker Tarhan. It was founded on 14 November 2014 following Tarhan's resignation from the Republican People's Party (CHP) due to disillusionment with the leadership of Kemal Kılıçdaroğlu. Its logo is composed of a rising sun with a sunflower, representing Anatolia and Thrace respectively. The party's name was subject to a legal complaint by former MP Yılmaz Hastürk, who claimed that the political parties law in Turkey forbade party names to refer to geographic regions, though a former party was named Great Anatolia Party without facing legal problems.

After a disappointing result at the June 2015 general election (where the party won just 0.06% of the vote), Tarhan decided to boycott the snap general election in November. The party's performance at the June general election and the decision to boycott the November general election gave rise to inner-party arguments, resulting in the executive taking the decision to disband the party in December 2015.

== Political line ==
The Anatolia Party has been described by Tarhan as laicist and progressive, in favour of an impartial justice system, democracy and unity. The party was created in response to the 12-year-long rule of the conservative Justice and Development Party (AKP) and the ineffectiveness of the CHP in opposition. The founding members of the party include a range of opposition intellectuals, former CHP members and also politicians formerly aligned with the centre-left Democratic Left Party (DSP) and the conservative Motherland Party (ANAP). In March 2015, two minuscule parties, namely Party for a Turkey without Disabilities and the National Alliance Platform joined the Anatolia Party.

== Background ==
=== Split from the CHP ===
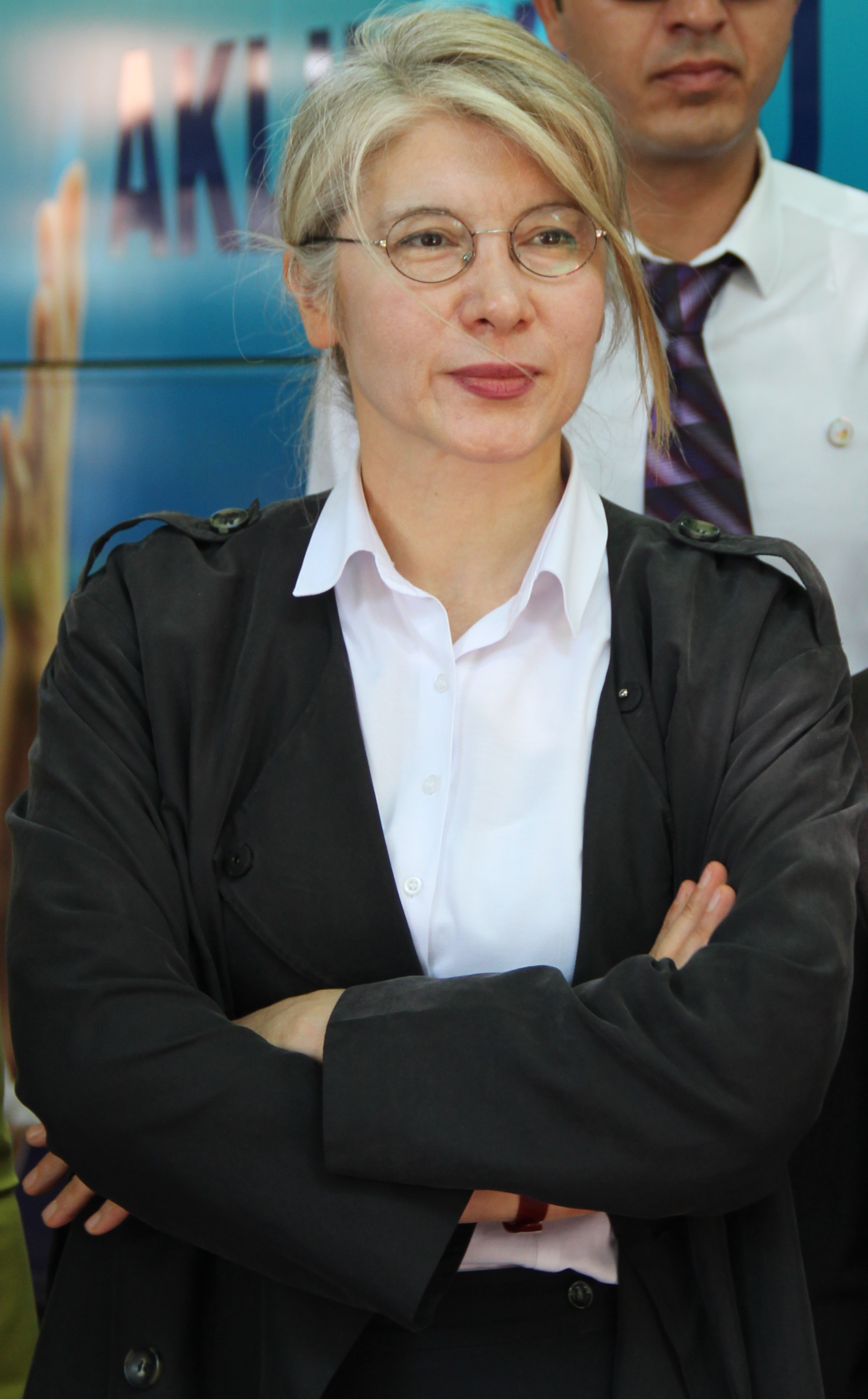
Emine Ülker Tarhan, founder and leader of the Anatolia Party

The Republican People's Party (CHP) has and continues to observe a split between the Kemalists who emphasize on nationalism and laicism and those who are more tolerant to non-secular and decentralized policies. A new initiative set out by CHP leader Kemal Kılıçdaroğlu led to the creation of a 'New CHP' (Yeni CHP, abbreviated YCHP), which aimed to increase the party's appeal to the Kurds in the south-east of the country. This led to opposition by the party's nationalist faction, and the YCHP initiative has been perceived as a failure, especially after many concerns were raised whether the party would continue to respect the principles of Mustafa Kemal Atatürk and its stance against the Kurdistan Workers' Party.

Entering parliament in the 2011 general election as a CHP Ankara MP, Emine Ülker Tarhan was a nationalist within her party. She was seen as a potential CHP presidential candidate in the 2014 presidential election, where Kılıçdaroğlu chose to nominate former Organisation of Islamic Co-operation secretary general Ekmeleddin İhsanoğlu instead. With strong opposition from several party members, Tarhan declared that she would not run as a rival. Several CHP MPs openly criticised the choice of candidate, with six even endorsing Tarhan for the candidacy despite her refusal to run. The election resulted in AKP candidate Recep Tayyip Erdoğan winning in the first round with 51.79% of the vote, while İhsanoğlu won 38.44% of the vote despite being backed by 15 opposition parties including the Nationalist Movement Party (MHP).

The poor election result led to CHP members such as Tarhan, Muharrem İnce and Süheyl Batum openly calling for Kılıçdaroğlu's resignation as party leader. Kılıçdaroğlu subsequently called for an extraordinary party convention, where the party delegate system meant that Kılıçdaroğlu was re-elected comfortably against rival Muharrem İnce. This led to further disillusionment within the party, and Tarhan announced her resignation from the CHP on 31 October 2014. In her resignation letter, she criticised the lack of any potential electoral prospects in the critical June 2015 general election, the selfishness of career politicians and the ineffectiveness of the party in opposition.

=== Founding members ===
The Anatolia Party was founded on 14 November 2014, with Tarhan as leader and a 43-member executive committee with members formerly affiliated with the CHP, the Democratic Left Party (DSP) and the Motherland Party (ANAP). The list of founding members can be found here.

Deputy leader Yunus Yunusoğlu claimed that the party's purpose was to not split the CHP's vote, but to win the 2015 election.

== Electoral performance ==
An opinion poll conducted by SONAR showed the party polling 8.04% of the vote without causing a significant vote split with the CHP. It was deemed likely that if true, the majority of this support came from former non-voters. Regardless, the party still polled under the 10% threshold necessary to gain seats in parliament, and more recent polls showed the party to not command any significant support. In the event of surpassing the 10% threshold in the next general election, a triple coalition with the CHP and Nationalist Movement Party (MHP) was a possible eventuality. However, the party only managed to win 0.06% of the vote in the June 2015 general election, coming 15th out of 20 parties. Tarhan subsequently lost her seat in Parliament.

== Dissolution ==
The party was disestablished on 21 December 2015 after inner-party arguments and poor election results.
