= Electronic Democracy Party =

Electronic Democracy Party Elektronik Demokrasi Partisi
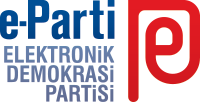
- Abbreviation: e-Parti
- Leader: Emrehan Halıcı
- Founded: November 26, 2014
- Split from: Republican People's Party (CHP)
- Headquarters: Ankara
- Ideology: E-democracy
- Political position: Single-issue
- Colors: blue & red

Website
- Official website

The Electronic Democracy Party (Turkish: Elektronik Demokrasi Partisi, abbreviated EDP, eP or e-Parti) is a political party in Turkey which advocates E-democracy and liberalism. It was formed by Emrehan Halıcı, a Member of Parliament from Ankara, on 26 November 2014. Halıcı had previously resigned from the Republican People's Party (CHP). The party highlights the democratic deficit and the lack of inner-party democracy as key areas of concern.

The Electronic Democracy Party is legally inactive according to September 2016 records of the Chief Public Prosecutor's Office.
