= Emine Ülker Tarhan =

Turkish politician

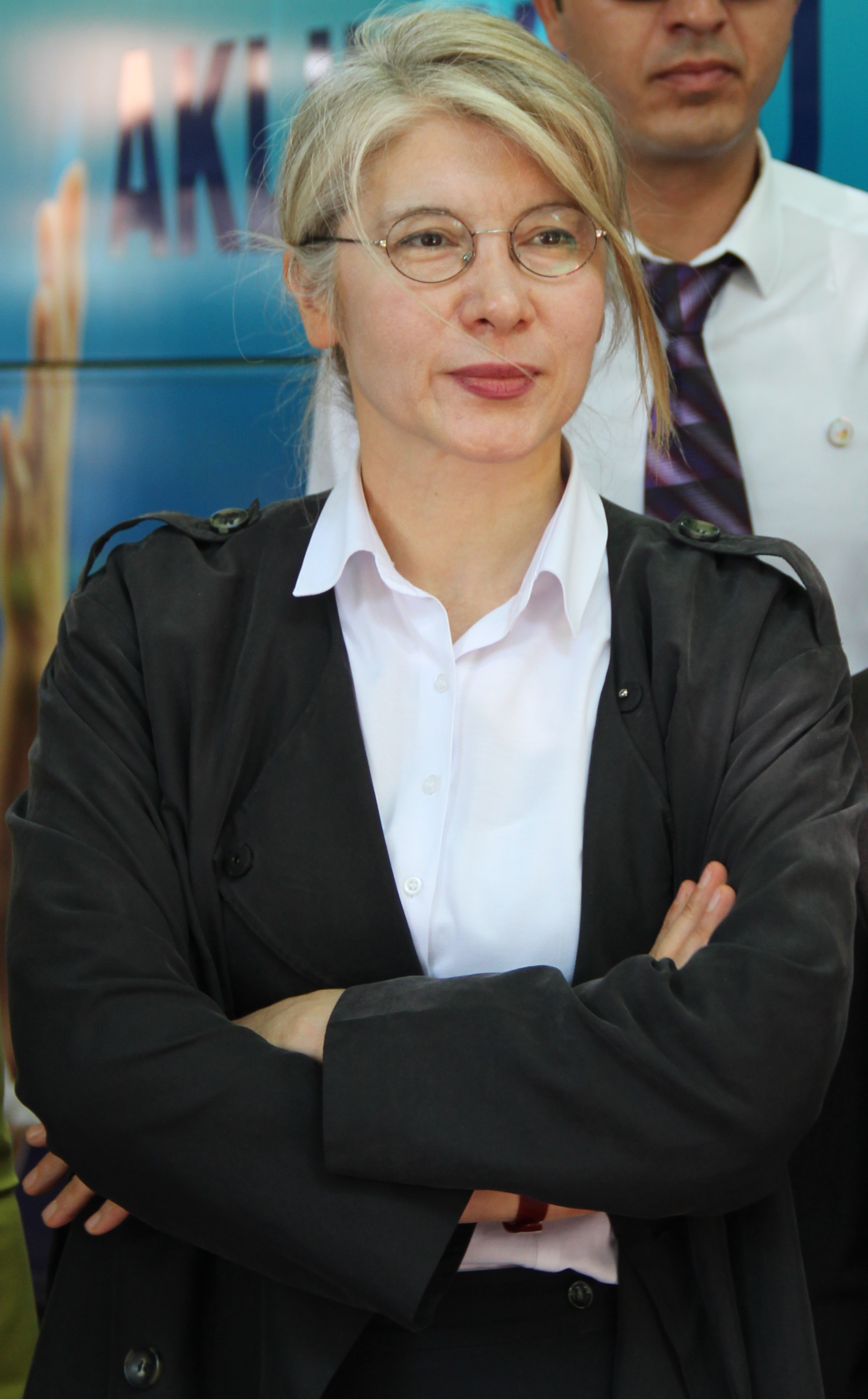

Leader of the Anatolia Party
- In office 14 November 2014 – 21 December 2015
- Deputy: Yunus Yunusoğlu
- Preceded by: Position established
- Succeeded by: Position abolished

Parliamentary group leader of the Republican People's Party
- In office 30 June 2011 – 26 June 2013
- Leader: Kemal Kılıçdaroğlu
- Preceded by: Kemal Anadol
- Succeeded by: Engin Altay

Member of the Grand National Assembly
- In office 12 June 2011 – 7 June 2015
- Constituency: Ankara (I) (2011)

Personal details
- Born: 29 November 1963 (age 62) Tarsus, Mersin Province, Turkey
- Party: Republican People's Party (2011–2014, 2026–present); Anatolia Party (2014–2015)
- Spouse: Mehmet Umur Tarhan
- Children: 2
- Education: Ankara University

Emine Ülker Tarhan (born 29 November 1963) is a Turkish jurist and politician from the Republican People's Party (Turkish: Cumhuriyet Halk Partisi, CHP). She was formerly a judge at the High Court of Appeals. She served as the vice spokesperson of her party in the parliament before resigning on 31 October 2014. She founded the Anatolia Party on 14 November 2014 and led it until its disestablishment in December 2015.

Tarhan was born in Tarsus, Mersin. She was educated at the Ankara University Law School. After working as a freelance lawyer, she became a public defender. She served as a judge at the High Court of Appeals.

Tarhan was a founding member of the Judges' and Prosecutors' Association (YARSAV). She served as its secretary general and chairperson.

== Start of her political career ==
She joined the Republican People's Party (CHP) and was elected to the Turkish Grand National Assembly as a deputy for Ankara in the 12 June 2011 general election.

During her tenure, she became a prominent opposition figure and gained national attention during the Gezi Park protests. In June 2013, she sat in front of a police water cannon vehicle (TOMA) in Ankara in protest against police intervention.

On 31 October 2014, Tarhan resigned from the CHP, citing disagreements with the party leadership and its political direction. Her resignation was widely interpreted as reflecting ideological tensions within the party, particularly between nationalist elements and the leadership of Kemal Kılıçdaroğlu.

In November 2014, she founded the Anatolia Party (Anadolu Partisi), describing it as a nationalist and secular alternative in Turkish politics. The party contested the June 2015 Turkish general election but failed to win parliamentary representation. It was dissolved later in 2015.

== Return to Politics ==
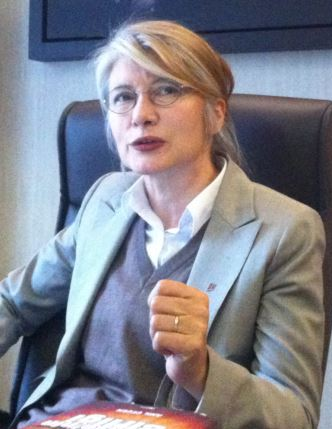

Following the dissolution of the Anatolia Party, Tarhan withdrew from active political life and largely disappeared from the public arena. Unlike many former politicians, however, her absence did not diminish public interest in her profile. On the contrary, recordings of her past parliamentary speeches and media appearances circulated widely on social media platforms, contributing to a renewed and, in some circles, growing popularity during her years away from frontline politics.

Despite refraining from participation in public debates, avoiding commentary on day-to-day political developments, and declining media interviews for an extended period, Tarhan continued to be referenced in political discussions and digital media.

On 24 March 2026, following discussions with senior officials of the Republican People's Party (CHP), she formally returned to the party. According to reports, her decision came after encouragement from a high-ranking CHP figure and was accompanied by significant media attention across a broad spectrum of political outlets.

There is a figure who has returned (to the CHP), and they call her the “Iron Lady” which that is Emine Ülker Tarhan.

— Deutsche Welle, 24 March 2026.

Tarhan is married and she is mother of two children.

On March 24, 2026, she returned to the CHP after 11 years.
