= June 2015 Nationalist Movement Party election campaign =

Election campaign in Turkey

Walk with us, Turkey Bizimle Yürü Türkiye
- Campaign: (Turkey) June 2015 general election
- Candidate: Devlet Bahçeli (as party leader); 550 parliamentary candidates
- Affiliation: Nationalist Movement Party (MHP)
- Status: Came third with 80 members elected
- Headquarters: Ankara, Turkey
- Key people: Devlet Bahçeli
- Slogan(s): Bizimle Yürü Türkiye (Walk with us, Turkey)
- Chant: Türkiye'nin Kalbi Burada! (Turkey's heart is here!)

The Nationalist Movement Party election campaign of June 2015 was the official election campaign of the Nationalist Movement Party (MHP) for the June 2015 general election in Turkey. The campaign was led by Devlet Bahçeli, who was contesting his fifth successive general election since being elected party leader in 1997.

In comparison to the other political parties, the MHP began their campaign relatively late, announcing their manifesto on 3 May 2015. The party's campaign mainly focused on electoral rallies, which were conducted in 60 different Provinces of Turkey within one month and their pledge to end the solution process with the Kurdish rebels. the MHP's rhetoric was dominated by negative campaigning against the AKP, whom Bahçeli accused of corruption and financing terrorism. Since 2013, the MHP was observed to have increased its support, taking many votes from disaffected nationalist voters who had deserted the AKP due to the solution process.

The party held its 11th Ordinary Congress on 21 March 2015 as scheduled, which had resulted in the unanimous election of Bahçeli as leader of the party unopposed. The party's Central Executive Committee (MYK) due to oversee the party's election campaign was also elected. Splits between key party officials, such as those between Bahçeli, Meral Akşener and Sinan Oğan also attracted media attention.

In the election, the party came third with 16.29% of the vote and came joint third with the Peoples' Democratic Party (HDP) with 80 seats in Parliament. During the course of the hung parliament, the party opted to steer clear of joining any coalition government, instead briefly calling for an early election. This was eventually called for 1 November 2015.

== Ordinary Congress, 21 March 2015 ==
MHP 21 March 2015 Ordinary Congress
Candidate	Votes	%
Devlet Bahçeli	1,149	100.0
Invalid/blank votes	11	–
Total	1,160	100.0
Number of delegates/turnout	1,242	93.4
Source: Sözcü

The 11th Nationalist Movement Party Ordinary Congress (Turkish: 11. Milliyetçi Hareket Partisi Olağan Kongresi) was held on 21 March 2015. The Congress resulted in the re-election of Devlet Bahçeli as party leader, with rivals failing to obtain enough signatures to contest the leadership election.

Held 78 days before the June 2015 general election, the congress also determined the MHP's election team and slogans. The main slogan used in the congress was 'Walk with us, Turkey!' (Bizimle Yürü Türkiye!). Bahçeli's speech also focussed heavily on criticising the Solution process initiated by the Turkish government with Kurdish separatists, thereby also indicating the main campaign issues and policies in the preparation for the general election.

== Candidate applications ==
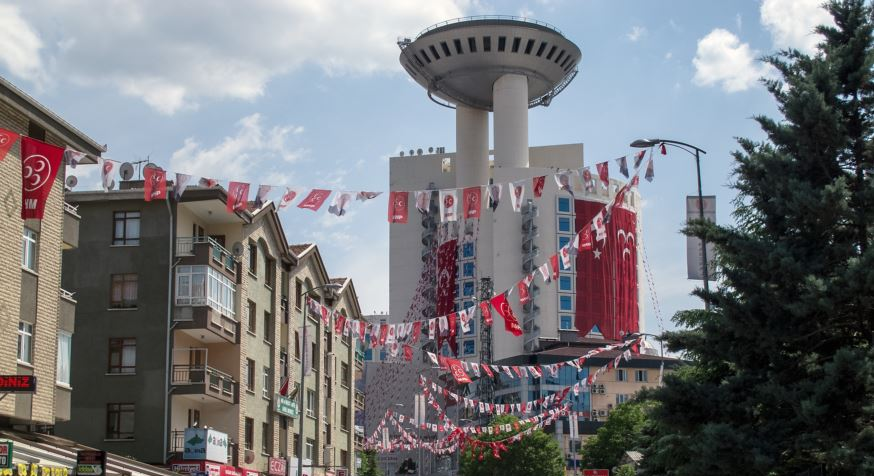
MHP party flags in Ankara with the party's headquarters in the background

The MHP has implemented one of the lowest application fees of any party for potential candidates. Between 12 and 18 March, all male, female and disabled citizens wishing to apply had to pay a fee of ₺2,000. The MHP had charged ₺2,500 in the 2011 general election. In response to plans to build a hotel in a greenfield site at İstinye in Istanbul, the MHP organised a seed-planting protest in the area In January. Actor Mehmet Aslan allegedly declared his potential candidacy during the event.

== Aims ==
The MHP has been predicted to build on its success in the 2014 local elections and significantly improve its vote share, with support coming from former AKP nationalist voters who are disillusioned with the Kurdish peace process. the MHP leader Devlet Bahçeli claimed that there was a very low possibility that such voters would return to the AKP, accusing the AKP of continuously changing ideologies from the Islamist National View to the more moderate Conservative democracy.

=== Negative campaigning ===
The MHP has strongly targeted the AKP in their campaign, accusing the Supreme Electoral Council of serving no-one apart from Recep Tayyip Erdoğan and vowing to bring violations of the law to justice in the future. Such promises include the sending of Erdoğan to the Court of Cassation and turning the new presidential palace into a museum about Atatürk and the Republic. The MHP began its electoral rallies on 6 May in the north of the country, with Bahçeli also making stops at local cafes during his campaign to directly meet with voters. Bahçeli endorsed the new legal process that had begun against the Gülen Movement, though criticised the AKP due to their previous relations with the Movement.

In May, the AKP appeared to have started a smear campaign against Meral Akşener, one of the MHP's most prominent politicians, claiming to be in possession of a video recording of her with private content. Akşener subsequently began legal proceedings against two pro-government journalists whom she accused of starting the defamation campaign against her. One of these journalists, Latif Erdoğan, claimed that the Gülen Movement had obtained the recording to blackmail Akşener, though both Akşener and Gülen's lawyer denied the claims and accused them of being baseless.

== Manifesto ==
The MHP's manifesto pledged to extend education to nine years and to end the Solution process with Kurdish militants. In their constitutional reform proposals, the party promised to keep a constitutional reference to the Turkish ethnicity while not allowing other minorities to obtain constitutional recognition. Pressing for a manufacturing based economy, the MHP has also pledged to investigate every individual involved in the 2013 government corruption scandal and to establish an anti-corruption commission to lead the investigation. The MHP has also promised a strong, international response to terrorism and to raise the minimum wage to ₺1,400.

== Electoral rallies ==
The MHP spent over ₺40 million of the ₺77 million it obtained from the Treasury on its election campaign, holding a rally in Rize for the first time in 20 years. In the space of one month (between 6 May and 6 June), the MHP conducted election rallies in 60 provinces, with one clashing with a HDP rally in Mersin. Numerous breakouts of violence between MHP and HDP supporters were also documented in their respective election events. One of the MHP's election songs was an adaptation of the popular Turkish folk music song Ankara'nın Bağları.

== See also ==
- Justice and Development Party election campaign, June 2015
- Republican People's Party election campaign, June 2015
- Peoples' Democratic Party election campaign, June 2015
