= June 2015 Peoples' Democratic Party election campaign =

We are HDP, we're for Parliament Biz'ler HDP, Biz'ler Meclise
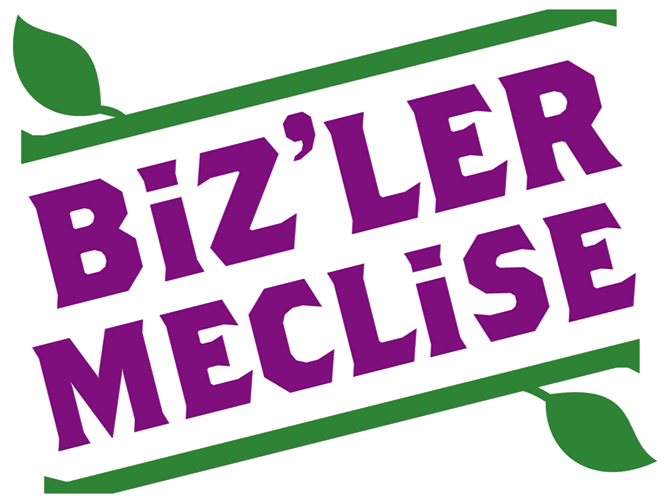
- Campaigned for: (Turkey) June 2015 general election
- Candidate: Selahattin Demirtaş and Figen Yüksekdağ (as party co-leaders); 550 parliamentary candidates
- Affiliation: Peoples' Democratic Party (HDP)
- Status: Came joint third with 80 members elected
- Headquarters: Ankara, Turkey
- Key people: Selahattin Demirtaş
- Slogan: Biz'ler HDP, Biz'ler Meclise (We are HDP, we're for Parliament)
- Chant: Büyük İnsanlık (Great Humanity)

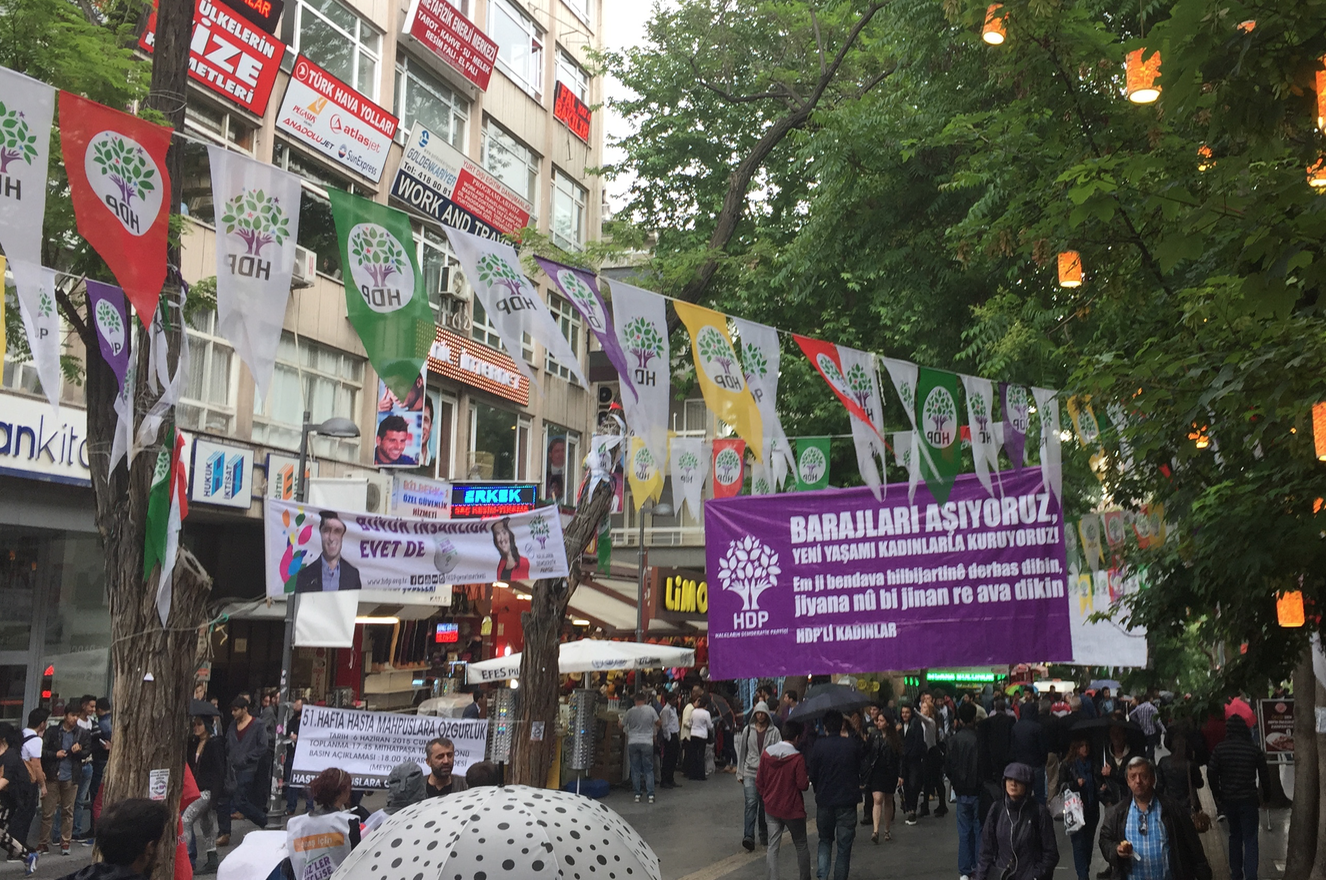
HDP election propaganda in Ankara, 5 June 2015.

The Peoples' Democratic Party election campaign of June 2015 was the official election campaign of the Peoples' Democratic Party (HDP) for the June 2015 general election in Turkey. the campaign was dominated by the party's co-leader Selahattin Demirtaş. It was the first time a pro-Kurdish party contested a general election as a political party rather than as independent candidates since the 2002 general election and the first time such a party won representation in Parliament.

== Aims ==
Emboldened by the 9.77% of the vote won by Peoples' Democratic Party co-leader Selahattin Demirtaş in the 2014 presidential election, The HDP contested the election by fielding party candidates rather than independent candidates. This was controversial since most of the HDP's votes would have been transferred to the AKP in the event that the HDP failed to win above 10% of the vote. There was speculation as to whether the AKP forced Öcalan to pressure the HDP to contest the election as a party in order to boost their own number of MPs. The party charged a ₺2,000 application fee for prospective male candidates, a ₺1,000 fee for female and young candidates under the age of 27 and no fee was collected from disabled applicants. Applications for candidacy were received between 16 February and 2 March.

== Candidate selections ==
According to Habertürk, the party has proposed to field Kurdish candidates in the west and Turkish candidates in the east, which is the opposite of the demographic make-up of the country. The party is also expected to increase its popularity by offering candidacies to famous individuals, such as actor Kadir İnanır. According to a private poll conducted by the HDP in January 2015, the party needs to gather around 600,000 more supporters by the general election in order to surpass the election threshold of 10% and win 72 MPs. Polling organisations such as Metropoll, however, predict that the party would win around 55 MPs if they won more than 10%. HDP candidates hoped that the victory of the left-wing SYRIZA in the 2015 Greek legislative election in January would result in a boost in popularity.

== Electoral alliances ==
=== United June Movement ===
In order to maximise their votes, the party's co-leader Figen Yüksekdağ announced that the HDP would begin negotiations with the United June Movement, a socialist intellectual and political platform that includes left-wing parties such as the Freedom and Solidarity Party (ÖDP) and the Labour Party (EMEP). Negotiations between these parties started in early 2015, with the intention of forming a broad alliance rather than a strict political coalition. Although Yüksekdağ ruled out negotiating with the CHP since they were 'closed to dialogue' and Demirtaş was opposed to negotiations, CHP deputy leader Sezgin Tanrıkulu said that the CHP was open for talks and that the two parties had until 7 April to come to an agreement. In the end, no such initiative was taken.

=== Republican People's Party ===
The Republican People's Party (CHP) has expressed interest in negotiating with the left-wing HDP as well as other left-wing parties such as the Labour Party (EMEP) and the Freedom and Solidarity Party (ÖDP). Despite this, CHP leader Kemal Kılıçdaroğlu identified the HDP as a threat to the party's support base during a Central Executive Committee meeting on 29 January and has sought to take 'measures' against the HDP. Despite key HDP leaders being opposed to talks with the CHP, the party's deputy leader Sezgin Tanrıkulu was allegedly engaged in closed negotiations with the HDP so that the talks do not generate controversy within the party's parliamentary group or voters.

== Manifesto ==
The HDP party's manifesto pledged to create a Ministry of Women and to establish 8 March International Women's Day as a national holiday. The party also promised to abolish the Presidency of Religious Affairs and the Council of Higher Education while reforming the university examination system to make universities more democratic and affordable. The party has also proposed policies to counter homophobia, to open the border with Armenia, to stop all investment into nuclear power, to raise the minimum wage to ₺1,800, reduce the maximum weekly working hours to 35, to establish a co-Prime Ministerial system for parties with more than one leader and to introduce elections to elect provincial governors (currently appointed by the government). On the issue of a presidential system, HDP co-leader Selahattin Demirtaş stated that the HDP would never support such a constitutional change, adding that he had always firmly opposed a presidential system despite allegations that the HDP had agreed to support the AKP on the matter behind closed doors.

== Violence ==
Political violence in the run-up to the general election targeted all of the major contesting parties, with campaign offices, candidates, party vehicles and supporters all being subject to attacks and vandalism. The HDP in particular, having been identified as a mainly pro-Kurdish party, had faced attacks from Turkish nationalists. The party's co-chair Selahattin Demirtaş stated on 5 May 2015 that 41 HDP offices had been subject to arson attacks since the party's establishment. The HDP's Adana and Mersin branch offices were also bombed in May, injuring three party activists. The HDP frequently claimed that the political responsibility for attacks against their party lay with the governing Justice and Development Party (AKP), which Demirtaş argued had been causing political polarisation and inciting violence.

On 18 April, armed men opened fire on the HDP headquarters, with two people later being taken into custody. Prime Minister Davutoğlu and President Erdoğan both condemned the attack, which occurred at 4am when the building was empty.

On 26 April, a HDP party office in Yalova was attacked by an armed gunman, who fired three shots at the office windows. Nobody was injured during the incident.

On 30 April, a HDP election stand in Uşak was approached by a mob, whom the stand's managers claimed were armed with clubs and were chanting anti-HDP slogans. Three people were injured during the ensuring fight, while the HDP leaflets and flags were burnt. The HDP activists were taken to a nearby HDP office under police escort.

=== Diyarbakır rally bombing ===
The HDP's Diyarbakır rally was due to take place on Friday 5 June, which was the last day before the election in which rallies were allowed. It was the HDP's last rally before polling day. Two bombs exploded at the rally, just before the party's chairman Selahattin Demirtaş was scheduled to speak. Initial reports by Mehdi Eker, the Ministry of Food, Agriculture and Livestock, claimed that two people were killed and over 100 were injured, with the rally being disbanded following the incident. Initial reports that the explosions could have been caused by the transformers nearby were dismissed by Taner Yıldız, the Minister of Energy and Natural Resources, who stated that an investigation by the Ministry revealed that the transformers had been tampered with from the outside.

== See also ==
- Justice and Development Party election campaign, June 2015
- Republican People's Party election campaign, June 2015
- Nationalist Movement Party election campaign, June 2015
