= Vefa (given name) =

Given name

Vefa (Turkish: [ve̞ˈfɑː]) is a Turkish masculine given name meaning loyalty. It is derived from the Arabic word Wafaa (Arabic: وفاء). Notable people with the name include:

- Emre Vefa Göktaş (born 1998), Turkish karateka
- Vefa Salman (born 1965), Turkish politician
- Vefa Tanır (born 1927), Turkish politician
- Vefa Temel (born 2002), Turkish-French footballer
