= 2014 Hakkari mayoral election =

Elections in Turkey

← 2009	30 March 2014	2019 →
Candidate	Dilek Hatipoğlu	Osman Kızılban
Party	BDP	AK Party
Popular vote	17,788	6,958
Percentage	66.76%	26.12%
Mayor before election
Fadıl Bedirhanoğlu
BDP
Elected Mayor
Dilek Hatipoğlu
BDP

Mayoral elections took place in the Turkish Province of Hakkari alongside nationwide local elections on 30 March 2014. A total of 8 municipalities were up for election, consisting of one central district municipality, two district municipalities and three belde (town) municipalities. The Hakkari central district Municipality was won by the Peace and Democracy Party (BDP).

== Results ==
Local Elections 2014: Hakkari Mayor
Party	Candidate	Votes	%	±%
BDP	Dilek Hatipoğlu	17,788	66.7	▼14.5
AK Party	Osman Kızılban	6,958	26.1	▲10.9
BTP	Nail Dişbudak	664	2.5	▲2.2
MHP	Belkıs Öztünç	624	2.3	▲1.5
CHP	Nazım Ertuş	382	1.4	▲0.9
SAADET	İdris Çiftçi	227	0.9	0.0
Majority		10,830	40.6	▼25.4
Turnout		26,643	82.3	▼2.0
BDP hold		Swing	-12.7	
