= 2014 Yalova mayoral election =

Local election in Turkey

- 1 June 2014
Candidate	Vefa Salman	Yakup Koçal
Party	CHP	AK Party
Popular vote	29,227	28,999
Percentage	48.00%	47.63%
Mayor before election
Yakup Koçal
AK Party
Elected Mayor
Vefa Salman
CHP

Mayoral elections were held in the Turkish Province of Yalova on 30 March 2014, as part of the nationwide local elections occurring on the same day. A total of 14 municipal mayors were elected in Yalova Province, with one mayor from Central Yalova, five mayors from neighbouring districts and 8 mayors from rural beldes (small towns).

== Background ==
=== 30 March election ===
The elections in central Yalova, the largest district and namesake of Yalova Province, were contested by Yakup Koçal, who had been elected as a Democrat in the 2009 local elections but switched to the Justice and Development Party (AKP) in 2013. His main challenger was Vefa Salman, the candidate of the main opposition Republican People's Party (CHP). On the initial election held on 30 March 2014, initial results gave Salman a narrow victory, though subsequent recounts requested by the AKP put Koçal ahead by a single vote. A large recount, requested by the CHP's only MP for Yalova, Muharrem İnce, again resulted in Salman claiming victory. Subsequent investigations by the Supreme Electoral Council of Turkey cancelled the election altogether due to allegations of misconduct from both sides and the inability to establish the victor after numerous recounts.

=== 1 June election ===
Fresh elections were scheduled for 1 June 2014, along with other repeat elections in different provinces from 30 March that had been cancelled on similar grounds. The vote and count proceeded with relatively little controversy, with Salman emerging as the narrow winner with a majority of 228 votes (0.4%). Koçal subsequently conceded defeat.

Despite the CHP's victory in central Yalova, the AKP took 9 of the 14 municipalities up for election in the Province, with the CHP taking the remaining five.

== Results ==
Local Elections 2014: Yalova Mayor
Party	Candidate	Votes	%	±%
CHP	Vefa Salman	29,227	48.0	▲12.3
AK Party	Yakup Koçal	28,999	47.6	▲28.8
MHP	Ahmet Kaplan	843	1.4	▼2.5
HDP	Tuncay Turanlı	623	1.0	▲1.0
SAADET	Celal Korkmaz	566	0.9	▼1.7
Büyük Birlik	Talip Bayburtlu	282	0.5	▲0.5
DP	İsmail Türk	209	0.3	▼35.4
HAK-PAR	Memet Ölçer	39	0.1	▲0.1
BTP	Eşref Memiş	38	0.1	▼0.1
DYP	Cemal Turhan	21	0.0	0.0
MP	Recep Yıldırım	16	0.0	0.0
DSP	Hasan Hakan Bayraktar	15	0.0	▼0.9
LDP	Sezer Sevinçler	11	0.0	0.0
Majority		228	0.4	▼1.7
Turnout		60,889	80.3	▼2.3
CHP gain from DP		Swing		
