= Yağcıoğlu =

Yağcıoğlu may refer to:

== People ==
- İlker Yağcıoğlu (born 1966), Turkish footballer
- Süleyman Yağcıoğlu (born 1952), Turkish politician

== Places ==
- Yağcıoğlu, Polatlı, neighborhood in Turkey
