= Alternative and Change Party =

Alternative and Change Party Alternatif ve Değişim Partisi
- Abbreviation: AL PARTİ
- President: Mehmet Burkan
- Founded: 17 November 2008
- Dissolved: 8 July 2018
- Headquarters: Ankara
- Membership (2017): 0
- Ideology: Conservative democracy Economic liberalism
- Political position: Right-wing
- Colours: Gold

The Alternative and Change Party (Turkish: Alternatif ve Değişim Partisi, AL PARTİ) is a right-wing political party in Turkey led by Mehmet Burkan that advocates economic liberalism and identifies former Prime Minister Adnan Menderes, Turgut Özal and Necmettin Erbakan as the basis for the party's principles.

In 2014, the similarity of the party's name to the Alternative Party (A.P.) caused controversy since the AL Party's logo bears heavy resemblance to that of the ruling Justice and Development Party (AKP) logo. This led several AKP supporters to accuse the A.P. of attempting to mislead AKP voters, even though the A.P. were not contesting the election. The logo in question, consisting of a sun and bracelets, in fact belongs to the AL Party, which also did not contest the election. The AL Party explained their choice of the sun as their logo by claiming that the light bulb (The AKP's logo) no longer enlightens the people and also claimed that the bracelets resemble the wealth of the people.

In the 2011 general election, the AL Party supported the AKP, though has more recently criticised the AKP heavily for corruption and high unemployment.
