= Dilek Hatipoğlu =

Turkish politician

Co-Mayor of Hakkâri
- In office 2014–2015 Serving with Nurullah Çiftçi
- Preceded by: Fadıl Bedirhanoğlu
- Succeeded by: Cemil Kılıç

Personal details
- Born: 1975 (age 50–51) Varto, Muş Province, Turkey
- Party: Peace and Democracy Party; Democratic Regions Party
- Children: 2
- Education: Van Yüzüncü Yıl University
- Occupation: Politician, educator

Dilek Hatipoğlu (born in 1975 in Varto, Turkey) is a politician of the Democratic Regions Party (DBP) and a former mayor of Hakkâri. During her tenure she practiced the Co-Mayorship system with a male and a female Co-Mayor which meant to improve gender equality.

== Early life and education ==
She was born in 1975 in Varto, Mus province but later moved to Adana where she attended primary and secondary education. Having graduated in Business Administration she began to work as an educator.

== Political career ==
She was elected the Mayor of Hakkari in the local elections of March 2014. During her tenure she defended the bilingual signs in Turkish and Kurdish language before the municipality which before were criticized by the Sözcü newspaper. After a call for regional self-governance was reported from Hakkari, Hatipoglu and her Co-Mayor Nurullah Ciftçi were arrested in August 2015 for attempting to disrupt the unity of the state. Following Fatma Yildiz assumed as Vice-Mayor. On 11 November 2016 a trustee was appointed on behalf of the mayors while Fatma Yildiz was arrested on terror related charges.

=== Prosecution ===
In March 2015, Hatipoglu was sentenced to 15 years imprisonment by a court in Hakkari. In 2021, Hatipoglu and her Co-Mayor Nurullah Ciftçi faced a trial in which they were accused of misconduct by applying the co-mayor system. The co-mayor system grants the same rights to the elected mayor and the president of the city council and are of the opposite sex aiming for a gender egalitarian administration. She attended the hearing with a black eye, alleging having been beaten by prison guards. The black eye raised concerns on the conduct of prison guards by HDP MP Zuleyha Gülüm, who addressed the issue in parliament. In February 2021, she was sentenced to a further 2 years and 2 months imprisonment for misconduct due to the Co-Mayor system while her also imprisoned Co-Mayor was fined with 5,500 Turkish lira.

== Personal life ==
She is married and is the mother of two children.
