= Technology Development Party =

Technology Development Party Teknoloji Kalkınma Partisi
- Leader: Ahmet Özal
- Founded: 1998
- Preceded by: National Association Party (1998-2007); Alternative Party (2007-2015); Principles and Values Party (2015-2022)
- Headquarters: Ankara, Turkey
- Membership (2026): ▲8,618
- Ideology: Liberalism; Fiscal conservatism Pro-Europeanism
- Political position: Centre-right
- International affiliation: None
- Colours: Red and yellow

The Technology Development Party (Turkish: Teknoloji Kalkınma Partisi) is a conservative political party in Turkey founded in 1998.

It is, as claimed by its leader Süleyman Yağcıoğlu, the successor to the Motherland Party (ANAP), which was in government between 1983 and 1991. The party was known as the National Association Party until 2008, where it changed its name to Alternative Party after the ANAP announced that it would merge with the Democrat Party (DP).

The party's former leader Süleyman Yağcıoğlu strongly endorsed the ANAP's founder and two-term Prime Minister Turgut Özal, who also served as the 8th President of Turkey. Noting that former leader of the Justice and Development Party (AKP) Recep Tayyip Erdoğan also endorsed Özal during the 2014 local election campaign, the ALP withdrew from the election and supported the AKP.

The party favours devolution to local authorities, lower taxes and European Union membership. The ALP further advocates the lowering of the parliamentary threshold during general elections from 10% to 2% and also the scrapping of the Political Parties law in order to increase inner-party democracy. The party is against politics that involves language, religious or ethnic discrimination.

== History ==
=== National Association Party (1998-2007) ===
Founded in 1998, the National Association Party (UBP) was first led by Semih Tufan Gülaltay, who was convicted in 2005 for murder, forgery and also for possessing membership of the True Path Party while serving as the UBP leader. After he stepped down by order of the Court of Cassation in 2005, Gencehan Tunay was elected leader. He was eventually succeeded by İlker Bircan, who changed the party's name to Alternative Party and also adopted a more liberal ideology in contrast to the UBP's Turkish nationalism. The current leader of the party is Süleyman Yağcıoğlu, who was an ANAP Member of Parliament elected in the 1983 general election.

=== Alternative Party (2007-2015) ===
The Alternative Party is the continuation of the National Unity Party. İlker Bircan, who was elected as the chairman of the National Unity Party in the congress held in 2007, changed its name to the Alternative Party.

=== Principles and Values Party (2015-2022) ===
In March 2015, the party took the decision to dissolve during a congress and to change its name to Principles and Values Party (İlke ve Değerler Partisi) or (İLK Parti).

=== Technology Development Party (2015-2022) ===
On April 11, 2022, Ahmet Özal was elected as the chairman of the Principles and Values Party and the name of the party was changed to Technology Development Party (TEK Party). The party leader Ahmet Özal announced his candidacy for the 2023 Turkish presidential election but was not able to collect enough signatures for the candidacy. Later on, the party decided to endorse Kemal Kılıçdaroğlu instead.

== Logo controversy ==
The ALP was involved in a logo controversy in the run-up to the 2014 local elections, where several AKP activists and journalised confused the party with another party with a similar name, the Alternative and Change Party (ADP). The ADP frequently uses the abbreviation AL PARTİ and adopts a logo very similar to that of the AKP, which uses the abbreviation AK PARTİ. The ALP, which decided to not contest the elections and support the AKP instead, was thus accused of attempting to mislead AKP voters during the election in order to increase their own vote, since many observers initially mistook the ADP's logo for that of the ALP. The ALP's logo is a map of Turkey with a sun rising from behind, which does not resemble any other party logo.
