= Merkez Türkiye =

Proposal for a planned city in Turkey

Central Turkey Merkez Türkiye
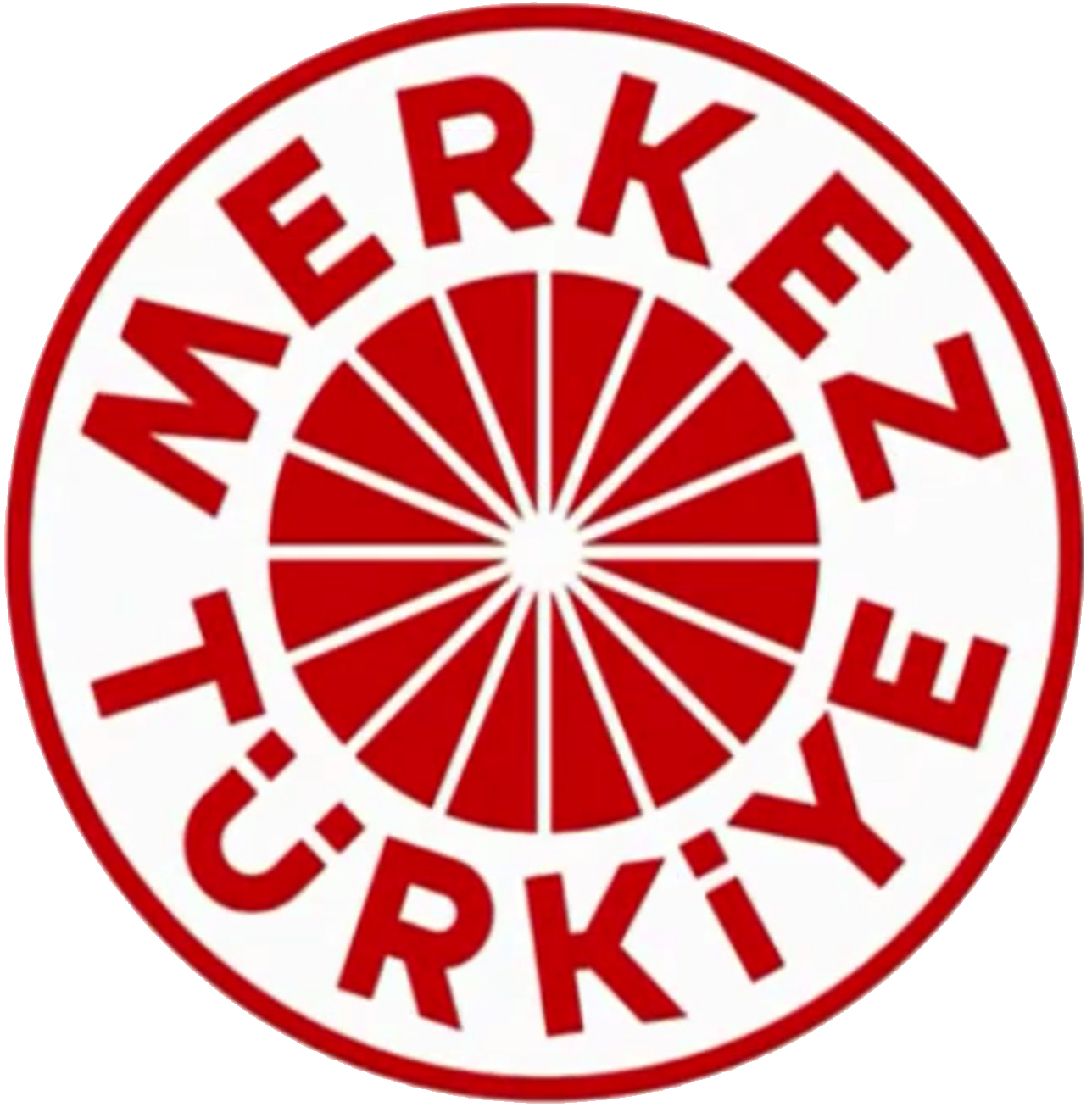
- Commercial?: Yes
- Type of project: Planned megacity
- Location: Central Anatolia, Turkey
- Founder: Republican People's Party (CHP)
- Key people: Kemal Kılıçdaroğlu
- Established: 21 May 2015
- Funding: US$40 billion by the state and US$160 billion by the private sector over 20 years
- Status: Proposed

The Merkez Türkiye (English: Centre Turkey, Hub Turkey or Central Turkey) project is a proposal for a planned megacity put forward by Turkey's main opposition Republican People's Party (CHP) on 21 May 2015, as part of their June 2015 general election campaign. The project plans to use Turkey's strategic geographical positioning to establish a centre for global trade and commerce in Central Anatolia. It was branded as Turkey's 'economic empowerment project' (Ekonomi Yükseliş Projesi) and was nicknamed 'the Project of the Century' (Yüzyılın projesi).

== Background ==
=== June 2015 general election ===
The proposal was announced and made public on 21 May 2015 by the Republican People's Party (CHP), which nicknamed it the 'Project of the Century' and released a 7-minute video on YouTube containing details about the proposal. The project was seen as an attempt by the CHP to portray itself as a strong alternative to the governing Justice and Development Party (AKP) on infrastructure policy, since the AKP has drawn strong support in the past for its investment in new roads, airports and planned infrastructure projects such as Kanal Istanbul. Announced 17 days before the June 2015 general election, the project did not show a significant impact in the polls, with the CHP continuing to trail the AKP at 25-27%.

=== Global trade ===
Amid the One Belt, One Road and the Maritime Silk Road initiative for the Silk Road Economic Belt, the Initiative for the Integration of the Regional Infrastructure of South America and the Kunming–Singapore Railway, Merkez Türkiye was designed to become the fourth of a group of global projects designed to connect different trade routes. The project aims to not just link roads and other modes of transport to increase trade, but to also link different world economies, industries, markets, cultures and lifestyles.

== Planned megacity ==
In an initiative to link both the east and west, the proposal would be based around a megacity being built in Central Anatolia, with maps being presented with the project advertisements indicating a possible location near the provinces of Kayseri, Sivas, Malatya and Kahramanmaraş. However, it was later revealed that the location was purposefully kept a secret so that residents of the affected area would not make unfair profits before construction began.

=== Funding ===
The city's infrastructure construction is expected to be funded by over US$40 billion of state funds over 20 years. Meanwhile, it is projected that the private sector will provide US$160 billion in funds for superstructure investment, from both domestic and foreign sources.

=== Construction ===
Under the CHP's proposals, the city would operate on its own legal framework, devolved and separated from the existing laws of Turkey. The proposals also include the cutting of red tape and the elimination of bureaucracy in order to boost economic confidence for investors. The foundations of the megacity would be complete by 2020 and grow in stages, to be fully completed by 2035. Its population is expected to exceed 3 million and link Turkish motorways in a central hub, as well as link landlocked provinces with ports.

=== Characteristics ===
The city will serve as a hub for logistics, financial, light manufacturing and automotive industries. The city will also cater for handling and packaging, packaging manufacturing, recycling, temperature controlled storage and distribution of goods, product assembly, labelling, manufacturing and distribution of building materials, storage and distribution of pharmaceuticals, agricultural food processing, standardisation, certification and surveillance, exhibitions, distribution of replacement goods, grain silo tanks, product markets, sub-industrial infrastructure for logistics support, insurance firms and technology firms. The city is also planned to become a hub for research and development, house a technology park and numerous universities.

=== Transportation facilities ===
The megacity is planned to be served by high-capacity roads, railway (for both land routes and train ferries) and an airport in order to create a centre for consolidation that increases the capacity and efficiency for trade. The transportation links will link the city to the southern ports in Mersin and Iskenderun for links to the Mediterranean Sea for both European and North African destinations as well as northern ports in Samsun and Trabzon for links to the Black Sea, with destinations including Russia and Ukraine.

== Implications ==
=== International trade ===
The project is designed to both shorten and increase the efficiency for global trade, creating a city with its own legal framework that is designed to accommodate international trade laws and regulations. An example of the effect that Merkez Türkiye would have on global trade is given in the project's video presentation, where the 50- to 55-day waiting time for goods to be transported from China to Baku in Azerbaijan is lowered to 15 hours via train when the goods reach Merkez Türkiye.

=== Domestic economy ===
The project is part of the CHP's policies to eradicate poverty in Turkey, with the city planned to end domestic migration and provide 1,633,000 jobs in its initial stages. Its economic impact throughout Turkey is estimated to provide over 2,200,000 new jobs throughout other parts of the country. By 2035, it is estimated that Merkez Türkiye would provide US$100 billion in added value per year, with economic impact of the project in other parts of the region bringing the total up to approximately US$147 billion in added value. The project will result in Turkey's national income rising to US$2.7 trillion by 2035, with Merkez Türkiye contributing to 5.5% of this national income. Turkey's national income per head is estimated to rise to US$30,294 by 2035, with national income per head in Merkez Türkiye alone expected to be US$33,323. With the project's completion, it is projected that Turkey will become one of the top 20 countries for human development, with unemployment falling below 5% and average economic growth reaching 6% per annum.

Economic indicator	Latest figures	Merkez Türkiye (2035)	Change
National income	$1.4 trillion (2013)	$2.7 trillion	▲92.8%
Per capita income	$18,800 (2013)	$30,294	▲61.1%
Unemployment	9.8% (April 2015)	below 5%	▼4.8%
Annual economic growth	2.9% (2014)	6%	▲3.1%

=== Environmental consequences ===
In order to create a city that minimises pollution, the proposals include plans to build large-scale solar and wind energy farms that will be the major sources of energy for the city. The city is also planned to become a recycling hub. It is also designed to be the region's greenest and ecologically friendly city.

== Reactions ==
=== Positive reception ===
It was observed by media commentators that the announcement of the Merkez Türkiye project generally received positive reviews on social media sites such as Twitter. The project was welcomed by several journalists and academics, who referred to the project as 'plausible' and claimed that it would change Turkey's bleak economic prospects for the better. The project's emphasis on research and development, which has been regularly been criticised for receiving too little funding in Turkey, was also an aspect of the proposal that was welcomed by journalists. Journalist and CHP Member of Parliament Mustafa Balbay referred to the project as 'at least 50 times more realistic than Erdoğan's Kanal Istanbul project.'

=== Criticism ===
The AKP Deputy Prime Minister Ali Babacan described the project as 'puzzling' and 'unfeasible', criticising the CHP's failure to state what province the city would be situated in. Calling the project unrealistic, Babacan also attacked the CHP's wider economic plan by claiming that greater spending would increase inflation rates. Fikri Işık, the Minister of Science, Industry and Technology, criticised the project by calling it 'eccentric' and claimed that Turkey needed to recognise the power of its existing cities rather than building a new one. Nurettin Canikli, the Ministry of Customs and Trade, claimed that the AKP government had created 1.4 million jobs in 2014 and called the project a 'dwarf project'. In response, CHP leader Kemal Kılıçdaroğlu stated that he would not take the criticisms into account unless the AKP could point out specific claws in the proposals. A member, economist and former government minister from the CHP, Kemal Derviş, also approached the project cautiously, stating that it had to be executed properly to be successful. Ebru Soytemel, a research associate at Oxford University claimed that the CHP should focus on making Turkey's existing cities more liveable since megacities rarely solve problems such as unemployment and usually come at a high cost. Mustafa Kadir Atasoy, a columnist in Türk Yurdu magazine claimed that the project does not mention culture, education and ecology.

=== Controversies ===
After the announcement, it was alleged that a planned new megacity was in fact a short-lived project thought up by the governing AKP, with many AKP politicians criticising the CHP for 'stealing' the idea. It was also claimed by pro-government media outlets that the Prime Minister Ahmet Davutoğlu had based his book "Stratejik Derinlik (Strategic Depth)" around the idea of Turkey becoming the central country in the region, accusing the CHP of stealing the AKP's ideals. During an electoral rally in Sinop, Davutoğlu claimed that he had used the term 'Merkez Türkiye' in his book back in the year 2000, accusing the CHP of 'academic theft'.

=== Political impact ===
The June 2015 general election resulted in the CHP remaining as the second largest party, suffering a decrease in their vote share since the 2011 general election. However, since the election resulted in a hung parliament, the prospect of a grand coalition between the AKP and the CHP remained. During coalition negotiations, the CHP presented 14 principles that would be at the centre of any coalition deal, with the Merkez Türkiye project briefly being mentioned in the party's 7th principle in regards to a new foreign policy outlook. These 14 principles were later lowered to five, though the need for a new foreign policy outlook remained as one of them. Coalition negotiations broke down in August, with a new snap general election being called for November 2015.

== See also ==
- Kanal Istanbul, a proposal to create a new canal through Istanbul by the Justice and Development Party (AKP), labelled as the party's 'crazy project'.
- 2023 vision, a list of economic and infrastructure targets set by Recep Tayyip Erdoğan to be completed by 2023, the centenary of the establishment of the Turkish Republic.
- Masdar City
- Neom
