= Süleyman Yağcıoğlu =

Turkish politician (born 1952)

Leader of the Alternative Party
- In office 26 June 2012 – 15 March 2015
- Preceded by: İlker Bircan
- Succeeded by: Party abolished

Member of the Grand National Assembly
- In office 6 November 1983 – 29 October 1987
- Constituency: Samsun (1983)

Personal details
- Born: 1952 (age 73–74) Samsun Province, Turkey
- Party: Motherland Party (1983-2012); Alternative Party (present)
- Children: 1
- Education: Istanbul University
- Profession: Dentist, politician

Süleyman Yağcıoğlu (born 1952) is a Turkish politician and was the leader of the Alternative Party (A.P.) between 2012 and 2015. He served as a Member of Parliament representing Samsun from the Motherland Party (ANAP) between 1983 and 1987.

Born in Samsun Province, Yağcıoğlu was educated in Istanbul and studied dentistry at Istanbul University while his father served as a Justice Party MP for Samsun. During his student years, he was part of the Islamist National Turkish Students' Union. He was elected as the Parliament's youngest MP in the 1983 general election and served on the Parliamentary Health and the Speaker's Council committees. In 1995, he was left out of the ANAP party lists but was elected to the party's Central Policymaking committee four consecutive times. Following the decline of ANAP and the decision to merge with the True Path Party, Yağcıoğlu joined the Alternative Party and became the party's leader. He has yet to contest any elections and has supported the ruling Justice and Development Party (AKP) in certain elections such as the 2014 local elections.

He is married and has a child.
