= June 2015 Justice and Development Party election campaign =

Turkish political party campaign

All Together for a New Turkey Hep Birlikte Yeni Türkiye
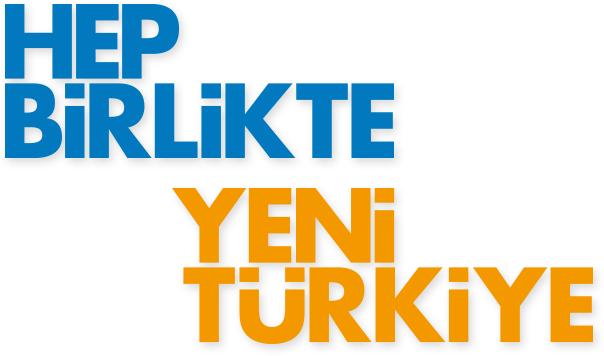
- Campaigned for: (Turkey) June 2015 general election
- Candidate: Ahmet Davutoğlu (as party leader); 550 parliamentary candidates
- Affiliation: Justice and Development Party (AKP)
- Status: Came first with 258 members elected, but lost their parliamentary majority
- Headquarters: Ankara, Turkey
- Key people: Ahmet Davutoğlu, Recep Tayyip Erdoğan
- Slogan: Hep Birlikte Yeni Türkiye (All Together for a New Turkey)
- Chant: Daima Adalet, Daima Kalkınma (Justice forever, Development forever)

The Justice and Development Party election campaign of June 2015 was the official election campaign of the Justice and Development Party (AKP) for the June 2015 general election. This was the fourth general election contested by the AKP, which was founded in 2001 and swept to power in a landslide victory in 2002. This was the first election contested by the AKP's new leader, Ahmet Davutoğlu, who was elected leader in September 2014 after the party's former leader Recep Tayyip Erdoğan was elected as the President of Turkey in August 2014.

According to opinion polls, the party was widely expected to come first for their fourth general election in a row. However, this was the first election in which there was a serious chance of the party losing their majority in Parliament, since the Peoples' Democratic Party (HDP) was expected to surpass the 10% election threshold and gain seats as a political party for the first time.

The AKP's leader Ahmet Davutoğlu announced that is party was targeting 55% of the vote, having won 49.83% in the 2011 general election. The party was widely expected to target 330 seats (a three-fifths majority) in Parliament, which would have been enough to submit constitutional changes to a referendum. One of the AKP's main election pledges was to rewrite the Constitution of Turkey. This would have paved the way for the disestablishment of the existing parliamentary system of government and its replacement by an executive presidency, another election pledge that was strongly supported by President Erdoğan. Erdoğan himself, despite legally being required to remain neutral, implicitly placed the AKP's target higher at 400 MPs, a feat that would only theoretically be achievable if both the HDP and the Nationalist Movement Party (MHP) fell below the 10% threshold.

The AKP campaign was widely controversial for alleged misuse of state funds to finance their campaign, as well as for the involvement of the AKP's former leader Recep Tayyip Erdoğan. Despite being constitutionally required to exercise political neutrality, Erdoğan was accused of covertly campaigning for the AKP by holding 'public opening rallies' throughout the different provinces in addition to the AKP's standard electoral rallies. The public opening rallies were often criticised for being a farce to cover-up Erdoğan's covert election campaign, since many foundations and infrastructure projects that were part of the public opening rallies were found to have been officially opened in prior ceremonies or non-existent in the first place.

The final results gave the AKP 40.87% of the vote, almost 9% less than their 2011 result of 49.83%. The party won 258 seats with the HDP taking much of their former support from the south-eastern regions, resulting in Turkey's first hung parliament since 1999. The party was tasked with forming a coalition government, with negotiations eventually proving unsuccessful and leading to a new snap election being called for November 2015.

== Aims ==
The AKP has publicly targeted 330 seats in order to be able to submit constitutional changes to a referendum. With drafting a new constitution being a central part of the AKP's manifesto, the party is expected to promote a presidential system and an advancement in the Solution process with Kurdish rebels in a new constitution. Critics have argued that such efforts would lead to a further decline in the separation of powers and democratic checks and balances, while the AKP has argued that the current constitution is outdated. Despite being constitutionally barred from being partisan, President Recep Tayyip Erdoğan made several statements in the lead-up to the election that set the AKP's electoral targets higher at 400 MPs, though even pro-AKP polling organisations show that such an eventuality is highly unlikely.

Announcing the party's manifesto on 15 April, Davutoğlu claimed that his party aimed to win 55% of the votes, and criticised Kılıçdaroğlu for his target of 35%.

== Extraordinary Congress, 27 August 2014 ==
Party	Candidate	Votes	%
AKP	Ahmet Davutoğlu	1,382	100.0
Invalid/blank votes		6	–
Total		1,388	100.0
Number of delegates/turnout		1,420	97.7

Prime Minister Erdoğan, who was re-elected for a third time in the 2011 general election, was barred from standing as an MP for a fourth term by the AKP's by-laws. Erdoğan became his party's presidential candidate for the 2014 presidential election and won narrowly in the first round with 51.79% of the vote. His ascension to the presidency required him to sever all ties with political parties and step down from parliament, requiring the AKP to elect a new leader.

On 21 August 2014, Erdoğan chaired an AKP Central Executive Committee meeting, after which Foreign Minister Ahmet Davutoğlu was announced as a candidate for the leadership. Davutoğlu was unanimously elected unopposed as the AKP's 2nd leader on 27 August 2014, a day before Erdoğan was due to take over as President from Abdullah Gül. The fact that there was no rival, combined with the exclusive means by which Davutoğlu was effectively declared as Erdoğan's successor by the Central Executive Committee, led to criticism and concern about inner-party democracy.

== Candidate selection ==
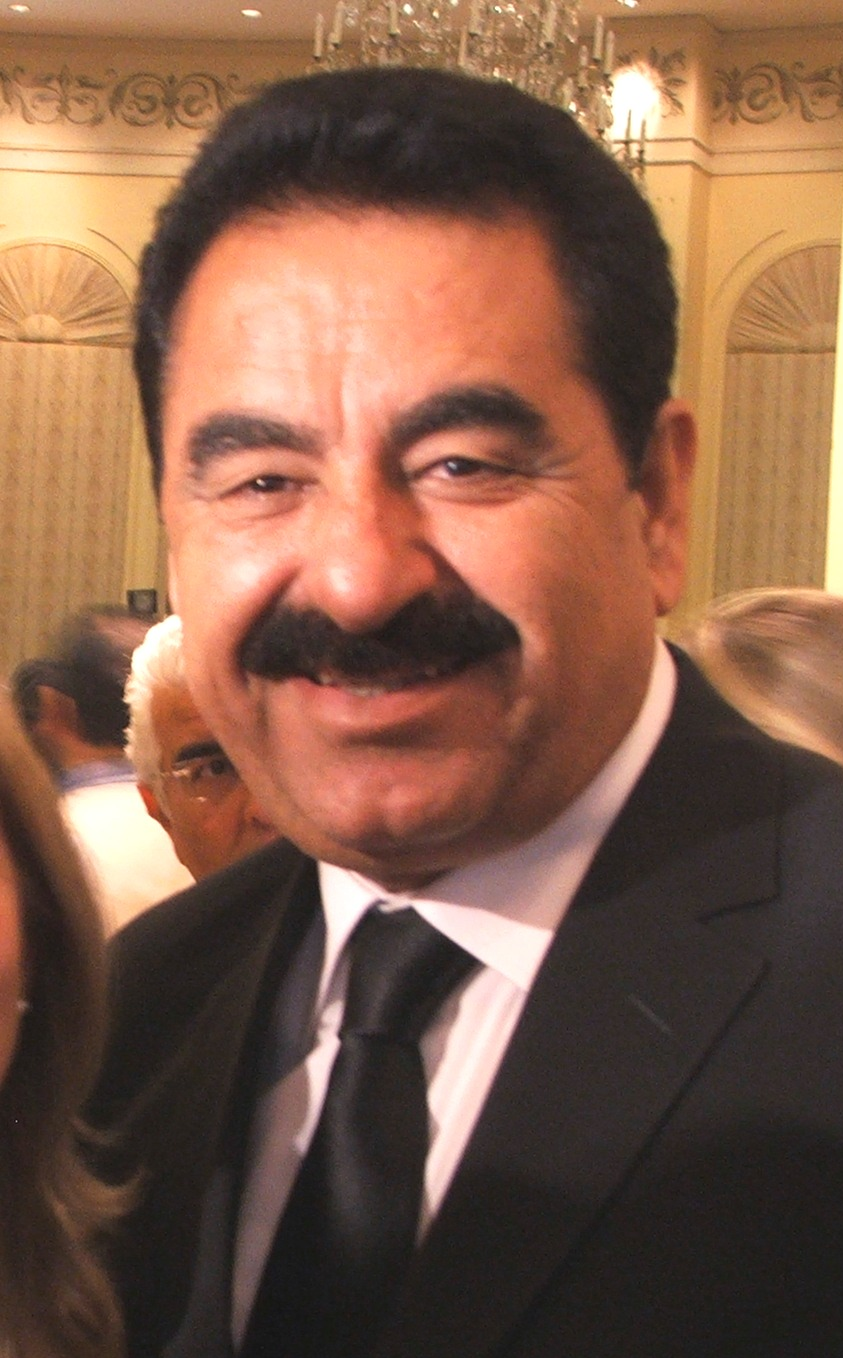
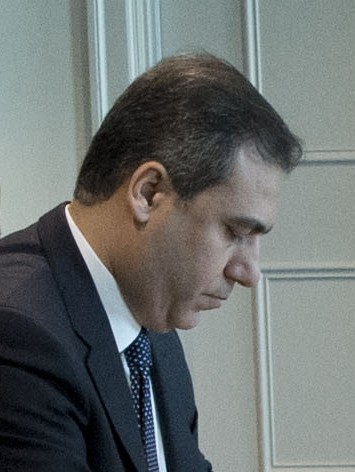
Singer İbrahim Tatlıses (left) and MİT undersecretary Hakan Fidan (right) both applied, without success, to become AKP candidates

Due to the AKP by-law that prohibits party candidates from running for more than three parliamentary terms, founding members of the party who first entered parliament in the 2002 general election will not be able to seek election in 2015. As a result, the party has indicated that founding members will occupy senior positions within the party structure following the elections. In a four-point candidate selection strategy, the AKP has intended to maintain its constant renewal of candidates as had occurred in the 2011 general election without abandoning key figures or fundamental principles. The party will also aim to recruit university law, engineering and medical graduates into the party while also reducing the average age of its parliamentary group by offering candidates under the age of 30 an active role in politics. The AKP has also expressed intentions to elect over 80 female MPs to Parliament. Provincial congresses are due to finish on 15 February.

Candidates for the AKP party lists were able to submit applications between the 11th and 20th of February, with male candidates pain ₺5,000, female candidates paying ₺2,500 and disabled candidates being able to apply without charge. Inspections into prospective candidates are due to take place between the 28th of February and the 1st of March, while interviews are due to be conducted between the 6th and 15th of March.

The undersecretary of the National Intelligence Organisation (MİT), Hakan Fidan, resigned in order to stand as an AKP candidate in the election, despite objections from Deputy Prime Minister Bülent Arınç. Fidan later withdrew his candidacy.

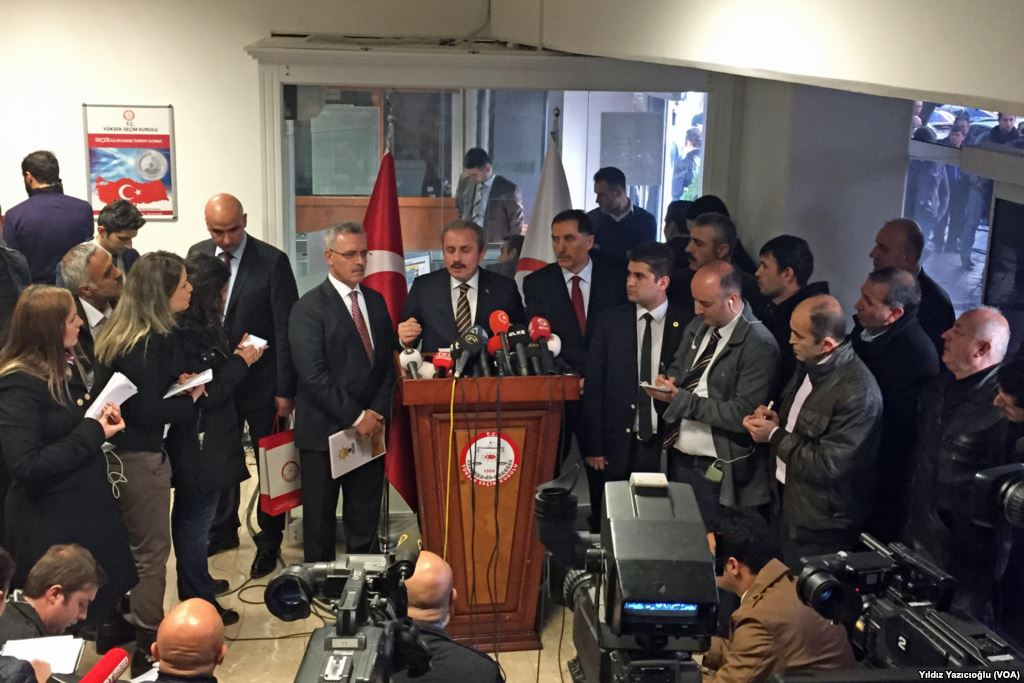
The AKP handing over their candidate lists to the Supreme Electoral Council of Turkey, 7 April 2015

Sources have indicated a potential split between Prime Minister Davutoğlu and President Erdoğan over the AKP lists to be put forward for election, with both politicians putting forward rival lists.

Some applicants advertised their candidacies by depicting themselves on their campaign posters with Ottoman-style attire to comply with the AKP's promotion of Ottoman-era culture and politics. A notable applicant, Osman Yavuz from Konya, became a Twitter sensation after his Ottoman-style campaign advertisement went viral. Yavuz was not selected as an AKP parliamentary candidate.

Full candidate lists were released on 7 April, with 175 MPs being unable to secure renomination. Notable MPs who failed to secure a place on the party lists included controversial Balıkesir MP Tülay Babuşcu. The son of Ankara mayor Melih Gökçek failed to secure nomination, while singer İbrahim Tatlıses and model Tuğçe Kazaz were also unable to obtain candidacy. President Erdoğan's son in law secured 6th place on the party's candidate list for Istanbul's 1st electoral district. An AKP parliamentary hopeful who failed to make the party list committed suicide shortly after the successful candidates were announced.

== Attacks against the opposition ==
On 28 January, the AKP's spokesperson Beşir Atalay called the CHP leader Kemal Kılıçdaroğlu a politician 'that could not be taken seriously' who had fallen into a 'funny situation'. He claimed that Kılıçdaroğlu was a 'puppet' of Fethullah Gülen and criticised him for objecting to Turkey's one-day period of mourning over the death of King Abdullah of Saudi Arabia while sending a message of condolences to the deceased's successor King Salman at the same time.

=== Bülent Arınç – Melih Gökçek polemic ===
In a response regarding the ongoing Solution process with Kurdish rebels, Deputy Prime Minister Bülent Arınç criticised President Erdoğan for making comments that allegedly interfered with the government's policy. Both Erdoğan and the AKP Mayor of Ankara Melih Gökçek subsequently criticised Arınç, with Gökçek taking to Twitter to demand Arınç's resignation, accusing him of being a supporter of Fethullah Gülen and constantly bringing the AKP into disrepute. Arınç responded by stating that Gökçek was too dishonourable to demand his resignation and that responding with abuse would only be bringing himself down to Gökçek's level. Arınç also claimed that Gökçek was trying to guarantee a position on the AKP party lists for his son, to which Gökçek responded by saying that Arınç should be sacked from his position since his chances of resigning were unlikely. After a series of abusive exchanges between Arınç and Gökçek, both threatened to take the other to court. Despite a statement from Prime Minister Davutoğlu warning both men to end their arguments, Arınç made a statement accusing Gökçek of bringing personal and family issues into the political sphere, for which he would not respect the Prime Minister's demands. The Ankara Attorney General began a criminal investigation into both individuals, though Arınç has parliamentary immunity from prosecution until the election.

== Split allegations ==
Allegations emerged on 23 March 2015 that former President Abdullah Gül is seeking to form a new party with other senior AKP figures such as Ali Babacan, Taner Yıldız and Mehmet Şimşek who are not allowed to seek a fourth term as AKP MPs. Gül allegedly gave the order to put 'the opposite of what Erdoğan has done' and also 'what the AKP has failed to do' in the party's manifesto. Although it remained unclear whether Gül would be leading the new party, it was said by his senior advisor Ahmet Takan that he was certain to be the new party's presidential candidate for the 2019 presidential election. After being asked about the AKP's candidate lists that were made public on 7 April, Gül publicly wished all the candidates well in the election.

== Electoral rallies ==
During a provincial congress at İzmir, Davutoğlu announced his intention to establish a Prime Ministerial office there with an intention to increase his presence in the city after the election. İzmir is seen as the key stronghold of the opposition CHP, thus making it an important electoral target for the AKP who made substantial gains throughout İzmir Province during the 2014 local elections and the 2011 general election. Davutoğlu's bid to establish a Prime Ministerial office, which currently only exists in Ankara and Istanbul has been seen as a bid to raise the city's profile and increase the AKP's influence over the city should they win the election.

== Influence of Recep Tayyip Erdoğan ==
The election campaign also faced controversy due to the heavy involvement of President Recep Tayyip Erdoğan both in public campaigning and private decision making concerning the AKP's election campaign. Erdoğan, who founded and led the AKP for 13 years, was elected President in 2014 by direct vote and thus was constitutionally required to sever all ties with the AKP and remain neutral in political affairs. Critics of the AKP and Erdoğan, however, have accused the President of openly being partisan.

=== 'Public opening' rallies ===
During the run-up to the election, President Recep Tayyip Erdoğan declared his intentions to hold rallies in all 81 Provinces of Turkey under the guise of 'public openings'. Most opposition and media commentators, however, have denounced the excuse of 'public openings' as a sham and have branded Erdoğan's rallies as an open political intervention by a constitutionally neutral President. Despite numerous formal complaints by the CHP, MHP and HDP, the Supreme Electoral Council of Turkey refused to stop Erdoğan from holding his rallies. During his speeches at these rallies, Erdoğan has been criticised for his political bias in favour of the AKP. During a rally in Siirt, Erdoğan criticised the CHP leader Kemal Kılıçdaroğlu for allegedly questioning his faith in the Quran. During a 1 May Labour Day speech, he also criticised the opposition parties for their promise to raise the minimum wage, though faced controversy himself when he revealed that he didn't know what the current minimum wage was. Erdoğan has also implicitly called for the electorate to grant the AKP at least 400 Members of Parliament in the general election, and admitted that his rallies were being funded by public money.

Most opposition politicians and journalists have denounced Erdoğan's rallies as a farce. It emerged that most of the new projects or foundations of new infrastructure that Erdoğan had claimed to inaugurate did not actually exist, with no lists of official openings being made available for the rallies. The real reason behind Erdoğan holding rallies was therefore perceived to be for political reasons aiding the AKP. Most of Erdoğan's rallies have been marked by a poor turnout, with a surprisingly small turnout in İzmir despite voters being shuttled in from neighbouring provinces being openly mocked by social media. Due to a poor turnout in Van, Erdoğan was forced to delay his appearance. It has been claimed that several public organisations and companies have been told to forcefully send their employees to the rallies in order to increase turnout. For the opening of Hakkari Yüksekova Airport where both President Erdoğan and Prime Minister Davutoğlu were in attendance, the Governor of Hakkari issued a statement revoking all leaves of absence for the day and threatened any public workers who did not attend with legal action.

Controversy arose when Erdoğan and the Patriotic Party wanted to conduct a rally at the same time and at the same place in Adana. The issue was taken to the Supreme Electoral Council, which decided that both could conduct their rallies at different times on the same day.

== See also ==
- Republican People's Party election campaign, June 2015
