= June 2015 Republican People's Party election campaign =

Election campaign in Turkey

A Liveable Turkey Yaşanacak Bir Türkiye
- Campaign: (Turkey) June 2015 general election
- Candidate: Kemal Kılıçdaroğlu (as party leader); 550 parliamentary candidates
- Affiliation: Republican People's Party (CHP)
- Status: Came second with 132 members elected
- Headquarters: Ankara, Turkey
- Key people: Kemal Kılıçdaroğlu, Gürsel Tekin
- Slogan: Yaşanacak Bir Türkiye (A Liveable Turkey)
- Chant: Milletçe Alkışlıyoruz (We applaud as a nation)

Website
- yasanacakbirturkiye.com (now defunct)

The Republican People's Party election campaign of June 2015 was the election campaign of the Republican People's Party (CHP), the main opposition political party in Turkey. The campaign, which was mainly centred on the slogan Yaşanacak Bir Türkiye (A Liveable Turkey), was for the June 2015 general election. Before the election, the CHP had signed a deal with the American election strategy firm Beneson Strategy Group to assist with the campaign.

This was the second general election contested by the party's leader Kemal Kılıçdaroğlu, who was first elected leader in 2010. The CHP's performance in elections since then have been subject to criticism by some party members, especially following the 2014 local elections and the 2014 presidential election. However, Kılıçdaroğlu survived a leadership challenge in September 2014 and led the party into the election amid a party split with the newly formed Anatolia Party (ANAPAR).

The campaign, similar to most Turkish political campaigns, centred on mass electoral rallies throughout different Provinces of Turkey, with key manifesto pledges being to raise the minimum wage and to re-open the suppressed investigations into government corruption that began in December 2013. In late May, the party announced a project to build a megacity in the centre of Turkey to act as a centre for international trade and commerce named Merkez Türkiye, seen to be a rival 'crazy project' to the governing Justice and Development Party's Kanal Istanbul project. For the first time in the party's history, the campaign also had an overseas component, since this was the first general election in which Turkish expats could vote from consulates in their respective countries of residence.

On 7 June 2015, the CHP maintained their position as the second largest party, losing to the AKP by almost 16 percentage points. The party won 11.5 million votes (24.95%) and finished with 132 elected Members of Parliament, a decrease of 3 since the 2011 general election. The party also suffered a decrease of 1.03% compared to their 2011 result, which was attributed to CHP voters voting tactically for the Peoples' Democratic Party (HDP) to ensure that they surpassed the 10% election threshold. No opinion poll (apart from one dubious poll released in March 2014) showed the CHP ahead of the AKP between 2011 and 2015.

== Aims ==
The party leader Kemal Kılıçdaroğlu stated that his party would lead the next government if they won 35% of the vote. This indicates a 9% rise since the 2011 general election.

== Extraordinary Convention, 8 September 2014 ==
| Party | Candidate | Votes | % |
|---|---|---|---|
| CHP | Kemal Kılıçdaroğlu | 740 | 64.1 |
| CHP | Muharrem İnce | 415 | 35.9 |
| Invalid/blank votes | | 26 | – |
| Total | | 1,181 | 100.0 |
| Number of delegates/turnout | | 1,218 | 94.8 |

The loss of the CHP's presidential candidate Ekmeleddin İhsanoğlu in the 2014 presidential election resulted in several senior party members losing confidence in the leadership of Kemal Kılıçdaroğlu, forcing him to call a leadership election. The party's performance in the 2014 local elections also drew speculation that Kılıçdaroğlu would resign after the party lost control of its stronghold Antalya and failed to win in Ankara or Istanbul. In the extraordinary convention held on 8 September 2014, Kılıçdaroğlu ran for re-election. Two other candidates, former parliamentary group leader Muharrem İnce and a former Kars parliamentary candidate Şahmar Dalmış declared their candidacy for the party leadership. Dalmış was unable to contest the election since he failed to secure any nominations.

Opinion polls showed that Kılıçdaroğlu was significantly more popular in south-eastern provinces, while İnce maintained more support throughout the west of the country. The delegationary system resulted in Kılıçdaroğlu winning comfortably with 64.1% of the delegates' vote, despite opinion polls showing that İnce was more popular with the party's voters. Kılıçdaroğlu had initially been endorsed for the leadership by 84.2% of the delegates while İnce received the remaining 15.8% of the nominations, which was just 0.8% more than necessary to be eligible to run for election. In the leadership election, İnce won 35.9% and immediately conceded defeat.

== Key components ==
=== Anadolu'nun Kemal'i ===
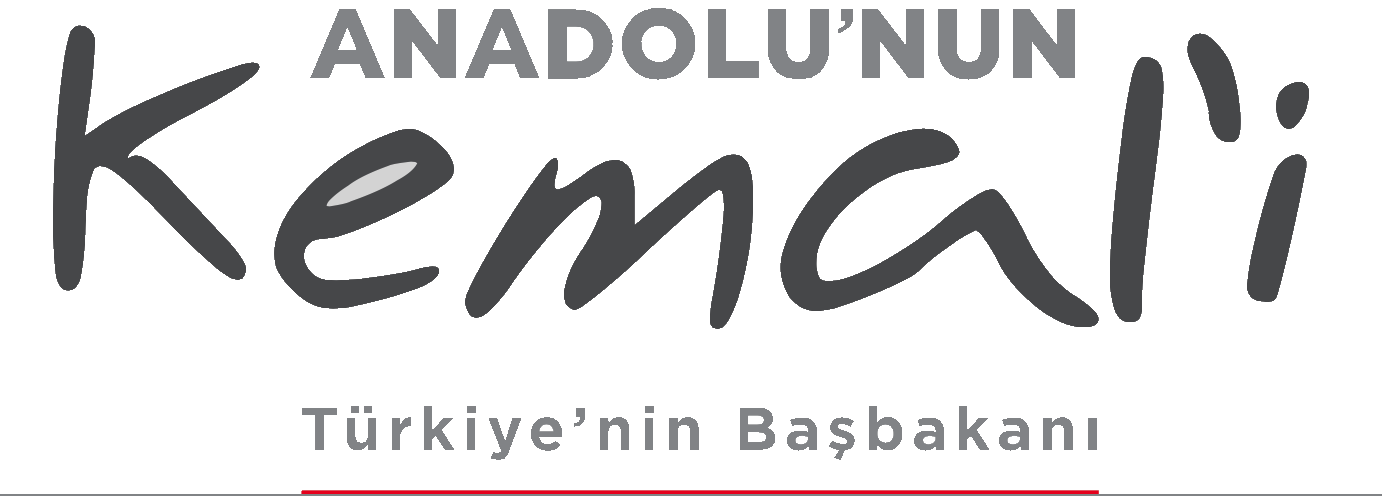
The logo of the Anadolu'nun Kemal'i documentary

Anadolu'nun Kemal'i was a short documentary about the party leader Kemal Kılıçdaroğlu, which was released on YouTube on 28 March 2015. At approximately 22 minutes, the documentary was prepared by Rıdvan Akar and documents Kılıçdaroğlu's early life and career before joining politics. It also contains exclusive interviews with individuals who are close to Kılıçdaroğlu, including his brothers, former colleagues, wife and children. Anadolu'nun Kemal'i translates to 'Anatolia's Kemal'.

=== Merkez Türkiye ===
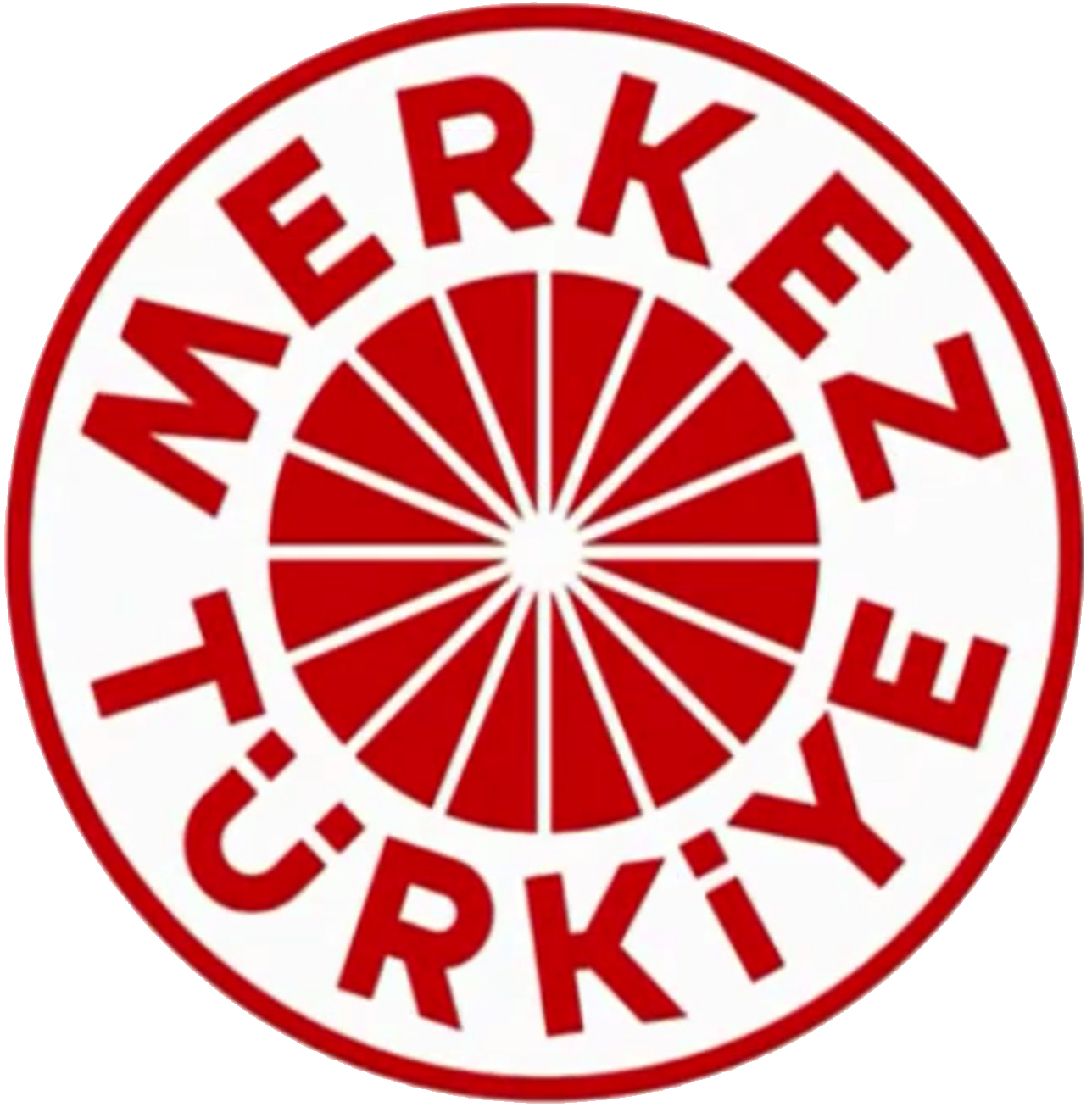
Logo of the Merkez Türkiye project proposal

The Merkez Türkiye (English: Centre Turkey, Hub Turkey or Central Turkey) project is a proposal for a planned megacity put forward by Turkey's main opposition Republican People's Party (CHP) on 21 May 2015, as part of their June 2015 general election campaign. The project plans to utilise Turkey's strategic geographical positioning to establish a centre for global trade and commerce in Central Anatolia. It was branded as Turkey's 'economic empowerment project' (Ekonomi Yükseliş Projesi) and was nicknamed 'the Project of the Century' (Yüzyılın projesi).

The proposal was announced and made public on 21 May 2015 by the Republican People's Party (CHP), which nicknamed it the 'Project of the Century' and released a 7-minute video on YouTube containing details about the proposal. The project was seen as an attempt by the CHP to portray itself as a strong alternative to the governing Justice and Development Party (AKP) on infrastructure policy, since the AKP has drawn strong support in the past for its investment in new roads, airports and planned infrastructure projects such as Kanal Istanbul. Announced 17 days before the June 2015 general election, the project did not show a significant impact in the polls, with the CHP continuing to trail the AKP at 25-27%.

== Candidate selection ==
Key individuals who have applied to become CHP parliamentary candidates have included the President of the Turkish Bars Association Metin Feyzioğlu and the head of the Journalists' Association Atilla Serter. Both have applied to become candidates in İzmir's second electoral district. The leader of the Rize Anatolian School family union Osman Erdoğan, a relative of Recep Tayyip Erdoğan, defected from the AKP to the CHP in early 2015.

Over 150 public sector workers have allegedly resigned in order to seek candidacy from the CHP, though many have reportedly withdrawn their resignations due to a lack of endorsement from CHP central offices. Candidates will be chosen either through preliminary elections or by the party leader Kemal Kılıçdaroğlu. The party leader will select a total of 27 candidates; 15 from Istanbul, 6 each from Ankara and İzmir and 1 each from Bursa, Eskişehir, Gaziantep, Adana, Mersin, Muğla, Manisa, Denizli and Aydın. In Istanbul, Kılıçdaroğlu will select five candidates from each electoral subdistrict for a total of 15. The party's spokesman Haluk Koç announced the fees for application to be ₺7,500 for those wishing to apply for candidacy through selection by the leadership. In order to stand in preliminary elections that were held in 51 provinces, the fees were ₺5,000 for men and ₺2,500 for women and disabled people.

Candidate applications ended on 2 March 2015 with 2,822 applications. The first nomination primaries were held in Zonguldak, Mersin, Malatya and Adıyaman on the same day. Most nomination primaries were held towards the end of March, with Kılıçdaroğlu himself securing his nomination in İzmir's 2nd electoral district. Former party leader Deniz Baykal contested the preliminary elections in Antalya, though notably failed come first. Mustafa Sarıgül came 9th in the Istanbul 2nd electoral district election, failing even to win in the district of Şişli where he had served as Mayor between 1999 and 2014. CHP supporters in Trabzon and Ardahan protested the lack of preliminary elections happening in their provinces. Frustrated youth wing members occupied the CHP provincial headquarters in Trabzon, after which it was decided to hold preliminary elections there instead. Turnout in İzmir was 55%, though turnouts were considerably higher in other provinces such as Isparta, where 74% of CHP members voted.

Candidates who applied for selection by the party leadership were chosen in early April. Key candidates such as Kamer Genç, Hüseyin Aygün and Umut Oran failed to make the party lists. A female Armenian candidate and a Romani candidate were both amongst the CHP lists, with the potential to become the first female Armenian and Romani MP in the history of the Turkish Republic. A CHP Istanbul MP who failed to secure renomination, Faik Tunay, claimed that he would make revelations about his party in a press conference. Şafak Pavey, who initially did not seek renomination, was persuaded to stand again as a CHP candidate and was selected as the CHP's first candidate in Istanbul's 1st electoral district.

== Electoral alliance negotiations ==
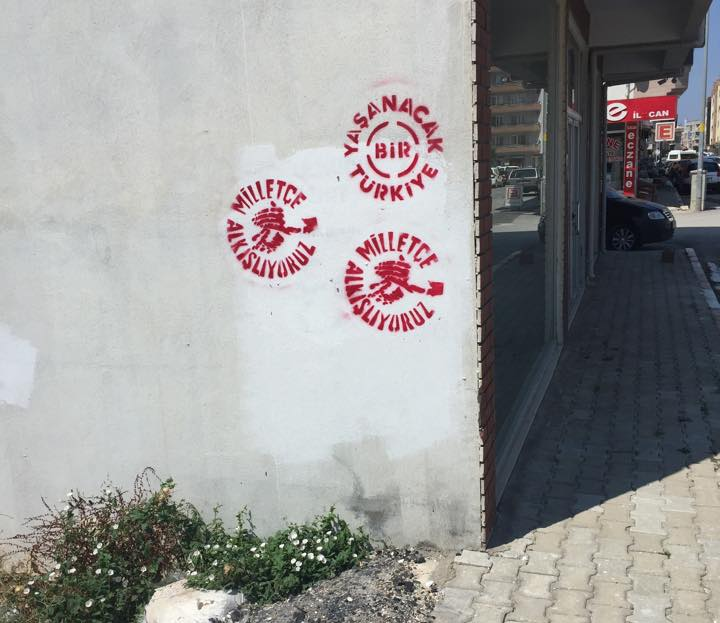
Street art depicting the CHP's two main campaign slogans, Milletçe Alkışlıyoruz (We applaud nationally) and Yaşanacak bir Türkiye (A liveable Turkey) in Seferihisar, İzmir

The CHP has expressed interest in negotiating with the left-wing HDP as well as other left-wing parties such as the Labour Party (EMEP) and the Freedom and Solidarity Party (ÖDP). Despite this, CHP leader Kemal Kılıçdaroğlu identified the HDP as a threat to the party's support base during a Central Executive Committee meeting on 29 January and has sought to take 'measures' against the HDP. The ÖDP has ruled out negotiating with the CHP while the EMEP leader Selma Gürkan has stressed the importance of doing so.

Despite key HDP leaders being opposed to talks with the CHP, the party's deputy leader Sezgin Tanrıkulu is allegedly engaged in closed negotiations with the HDP so that the talks do not generate controversy within the party's parliamentary group or voters. Several party members have resigned or openly criticised the CHP for seeking an alliance with the HDP. Workers' Party leader Doğu Perinçek claimed that the AKP had 'left' the terrorist group PKK in the 'lap of the CHP' in the lead-up to elections. As part of this potential electoral strategy, candidacies would be offered to the mother of Ali İsmail Korkmaz and the father of Berkin Elvan, both of whom were killed by government forces during the 2013 Gezi Park protests.

== Controversies ==
Controversy has risen over alleged links between the CHP and the exiled cleric Fethullah Gülen, who was formerly an AKP ally who withdrew support from Erdoğan in 2013. Amid allegations that Gülen had considered the CHP as a possible means of maintaining political influence in Turkey despite staunch differences in ideology, the CHP has come under increasing fire by the government and its own supporters for alleged collaborations with Gülen, who was once a fierce critic of the CHP. İzmir MP Birgül Ayman Güler resigned from the CHP in January 2015, accusing the CHP of collaborating with Gülen during the 2014 local elections. In February, CHP deputy leader Sezgin Tanrıkulu applied to the Ministry of Justice for a permit to visit Hidayet Karaca in Silivri Prison. Karaca, who is the head of the pro-Gülen Samanyolu TV, was taken into custody in 2014 for allegedly establishing a terrorist organisation. The party has also supported Bank Asya, a pro-Gülen bank that the AKP government attempted to shut down in 2014.

== Alleged closure case ==
In March 2015, a document allegedly regarding a closure case against the Republican People's Party was leaked online, causing many opposition politicians to accuse the AKP of attempting to eliminate competition through anti-democratic practices. The party's leader Kemal Kılıçdaroğlu confirmed the claims, stating that he had known about the preparations for a closure case for some time. According to Kılıçdaroğlu, the case would involve the printing of a controversial book about Turkey's president Mustafa Kemal Atatürk by the AKP, which will be found illegal by the courts and lead to the closure of the CHP since the party itself was founded by Atatürk.

AKP leader Ahmet Davutoğlu denied the claims and called for Kılıçdaroğlu to meet with him to put forward a constitutional amendment that would make it impossible for a political party to be shut down by the courts. This led to speculation that the closure case threat was in fact an attempt by the AKP to amend the constitution and avoid any closure cases against themselves in the future, having narrowly survived one in 2008 and an earlier case in 2001.

== Policies ==
In a document named the 'Vision of Justice, Freedom and Development', the CHP have outlined their main policies to guarantee workers' rights by removing the controversial 'Taşeron' system and bring about social democracy. In addition, the party has aimed at doubling welfare benefits while also increasing the social welfare of ten million retired citizens. Furthermore, the party will aim to liberalise the education system while also targeting child labour and growing unemployment. A commitment has also been made to preserve the separation of powers within the state as opposed to an 'elected monarchy' which the party accuse the AKP of trying to establish.

Party leader Kemal Kılıçdaroğlu presented a four-point pledge, signed by a notary, that committed to giving bonuses to pensioners during Eid al-Fitr and Eid al-Adha. He claimed that these arrangements would remain for every year that he is Prime Minister and that he would resign as Prime Minister and party leader if he did not meet his pledge.

=== Criticism of the government ===
Party leader Kemal Kılıçdaroğlu accused Ahmet Davutoğlu of not knowing anything about new legislation, arguing that they were handed down to him by his superiors. He accused the AKP of treating voters like 'second class citizens' and called the CHP a 'second home' for voters.

== Electoral rallies ==
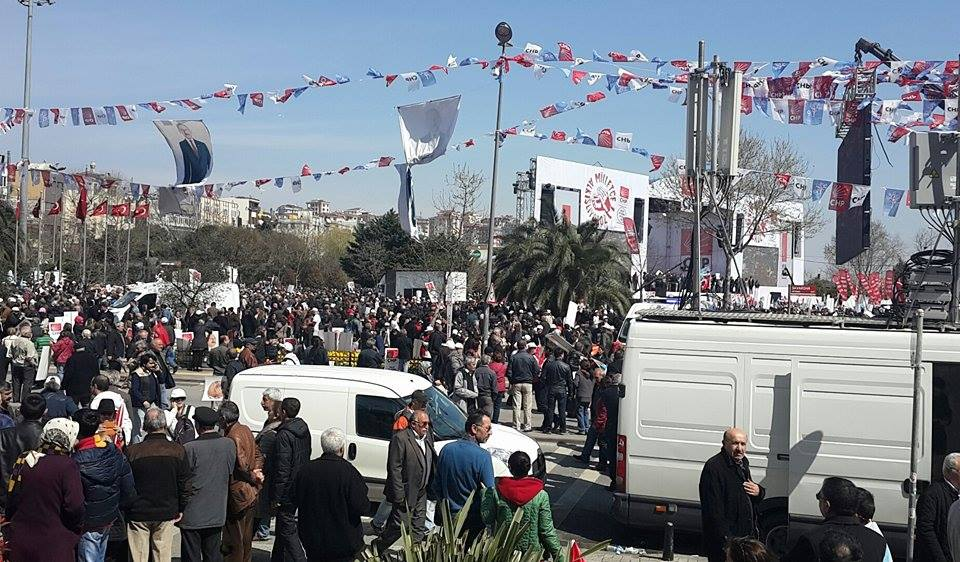
The CHP's Milletçe Alkışlıyoruz electoral rally in Kartal, Istanbul (11 April)

The CHP planned 50 electoral rallies throughout Turkey in what Kılıçdaroğlu styled as a 'meeting marathon' (Miting maratonu). During visits to different provinces, Kılıçdaroğlu is also due to make unplanned visits to town centres and other public places to meet with voters directly. Special measures were taken for people with disabilities, with the party accompanying its televised electoral rallies with sign language.

The CHP's inaugural electoral rally was held on 11 April in the Kartal district of Istanbul. The rally was styled as the 'National Applause rally' (Milletçe Alkışlıyoruz mitingi). During the rally, Kılıçdaroğlu appeared to unveil a new slogan, 'Do not be afraid, do not give up, do not cower' (Korkmayın, yılmayın, sinmeyin).

== See also ==
- Justice and Development Party election campaign, June 2015
