= Vefa Salman =

Turkish politician, mayor of Yalova

Mayor of Yalova
- In office 1 June 2014 – 27 February 2020
- Preceded by: Yakup Koçal
- Succeeded by: Mustafa Tutuk

Municipal Councillor of Yalova
- In office 29 March 2009 – 30 March 2014

Personal details
- Born: January 1, 1965 (age 61) Yalova, Turkey
- Party: Republican People's Party (CHP)
- Education: Uludağ University
- Occupation: Veterinary surgeon, journalist, poet, politician

Vefa Salman (born 1 January 1965) is a Turkish politician who is the incumbent Mayor of Yalova since 1 June 2014. Originally elected in the local elections held on 30 March 2014, the results in Yalova were invalidated by the Supreme Electoral Council of Turkey and the vote was re-held on 1 June, confirming his victory. He is a member of the Republican People's Party (CHP).

== Early life and career ==
Born in Yalova, Salman graduated from Uludağ University as a veterinary surgeon and worked within Yalova for over 20 years. He began writing for the local Haberci newspaper and later served as the editor and owner of the Yalovamız newspaper for over seven years. Also writing as a columnist for online local news sites, he remains as a representative for his hometown in the Istanbul Board of Veterinary Surgeons.

=== Early political career ===
He served as a member of the CHP Yalova provincial executive council for two terms, from 2003 to 2004 and from 2008 to 2009. From 2004 to 2007, he served on the executive council for the CHP Yalova district association. From 2004 to 2009, he was a municipal councillor for Yalova and the CHP group spokesperson.

== Mayor of Yalova, 2014–2020 ==
=== Election as mayor ===
Salman was the CHP candidate for the Mayor of Yalova, running against the incumbent Yakup Koçal from the Justice and Development Party (AKP) in the local elections of 2014. Initially ahead in the count, the AKP requested a recount, after which the AKP was declared the winner by a single vote. After the CHP requested a recount in 65 ballot boxes, the district electoral council decided to hold recounts in 124 ballot boxes, after which Salman was declared the winner by 6 votes. The Supreme Electoral Council subsequently cancelled the election in Yalova, rescheduling fresh elections for 1 June. Salman subsequently won the election by 228 votes over his AKP rival. His campaign was actively supported by Yalova Member of Parliament Muharrem İnce, who was then a parliamentary group leader for the CHP.

=== Deforestation controversy ===
As a CHP politician, Salman came under scrutiny for authorising the deforestation of several trees in order to make way for a new bridge and road junction. This was especially due to the strong environmentalist approach that the CHP and many party supporters took during the Gezi Park protests in 2013, which had initially began due to government plans to demolish a city park in order to build a shopping mall.

In response to criticism, Salman claimed that it had pained him to take the decision, but noted that the trees were not being cut down to make way for a new shopping mall, a thermal power station or new municipal offices. Rather, it was to increase the safety of a dangerous road junction responsible for several road casualties, and that as mayor he needed to prioritise human lives over trees.

On 27 February 2020, Vefa Salman was dismissed by the Ministry of Interior of the Republic of Turkey, and Mustafa Tutuk was elected instead of him by the vote in the municipal council.

== Personal life ==
Salman is a fan of Fenerbahçe sports club, having served as the President of the Yalova Fenerbahçe Association for two terms. He is also a poet, with his first book Özgünce being published in 2007. His second book was also published, and a third is currently being written. He is married to Dilek Salman, an English teacher. Their only son died in a car crash in 2012.
