= 2014 Turkish local elections =

Municipal elections in Turkey

- 30 March 2014; 1 June (re-runs)

All 81 Provinces of Turkey 30 metropolitan and 1,351 district municipal mayors 1,251 provincial and 20,500 municipal councillors
- Turnout: 89.15%
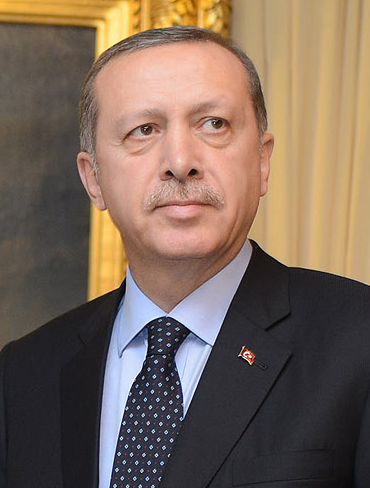

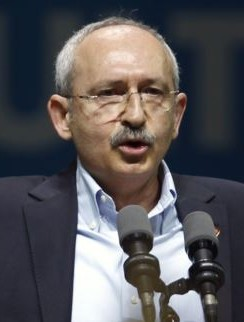

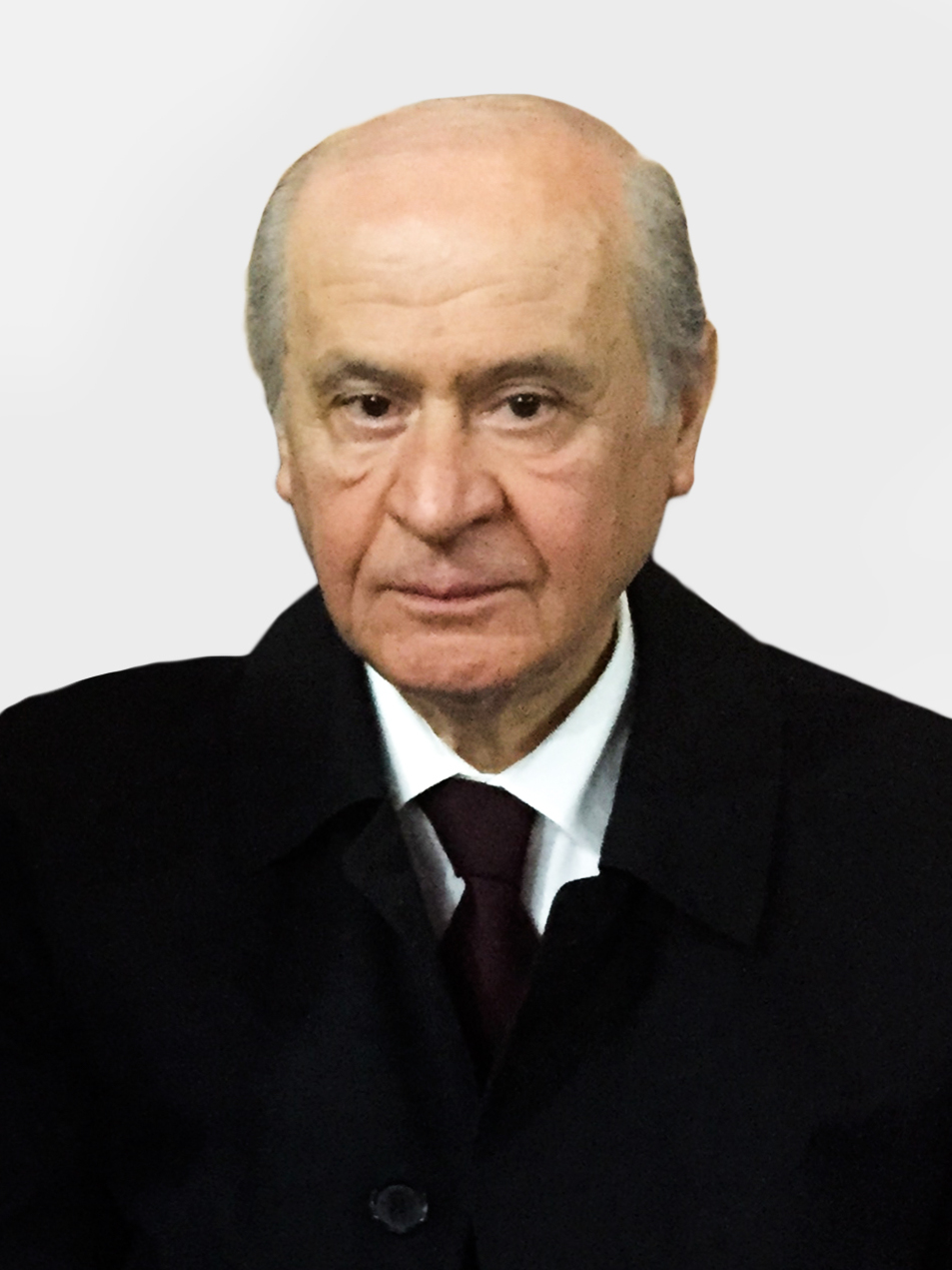

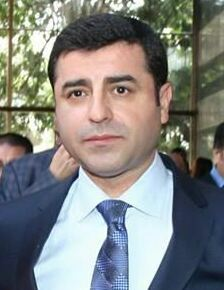
	Majority party	Minority party
Leader	Recep Tayyip Erdoğan	Kemal Kılıçdaroğlu
Party	AK Party	CHP
Last election	45 provinces, 38.39%	13 provinces, 23.08%
Provinces (Note: The number of metropolitan mayoralties won in the 30 metropolitan provinces and provincial capital mayoralties won in other provinces.)	48	14
Change	▲3	▲1
Popular vote (Note: Shows the results of the municipal councillor elections, which is the most representative indicator of nationwide party voting intention. See the official results here.)	17,802,976	10,938,262
Percentage	42.87%	26.34%
Swing	▲4.48 pp	▲3.26 pp
	Third party	Fourth party
Leader	Devlet Bahçeli	Selahattin Demirtaş*
Party	MHP	BDP / HDP
Last election	10 provinces, 15.97%	8 provinces, 5.70% (Note: as DTP)
Provinces	8	10
Change	▼2	▲2
Popular vote	7,399,119	2,611,127
Percentage	17.82%	6.29%
Swing	▲1.85 pp	▲1.03 pp
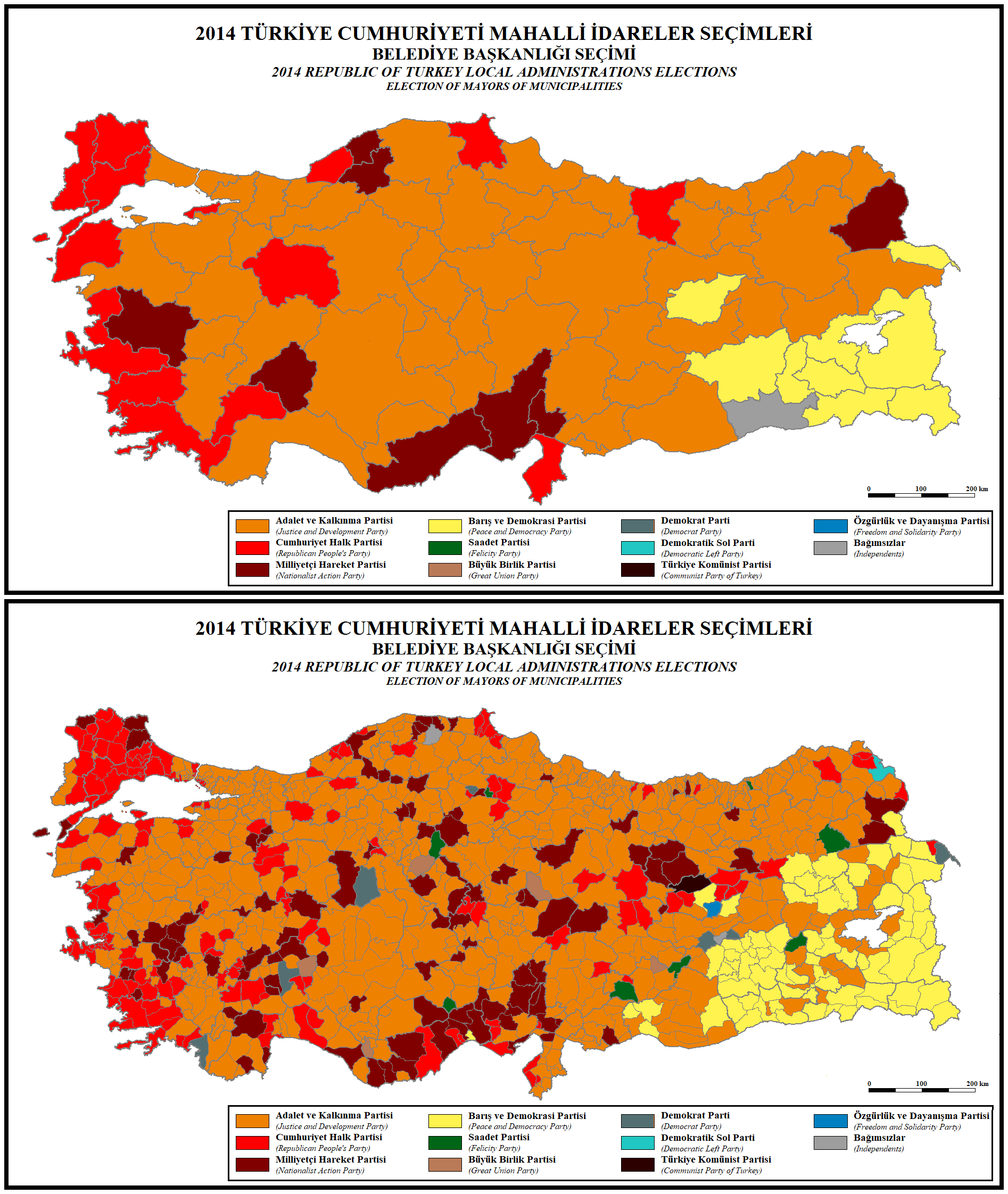
- Results map showing the winning party by provincial capitals (top) and by the districts of Turkey (bottom)^ Four different elections in order to elect both types of councillor and mayor were held on the same day. The results shown here are the municipal councillor election results, which best reflect the overall voting intentions of the electorate. See the results section for the full results. * The Peace and Democracy Party (BDP) ran alongside the Peoples' Democratic Party (HDP). The combined results of both are shown.

Local elections (formal: local authority general elections, Turkish: Mahalli İdareler Genel Seçimi or simply Yerel Seçimleri) were held in Turkey on 30 March 2014, with some repeated on 1 June 2014. Metropolitan and district mayors as well as their municipal council members in cities, and muhtars and "elderly councils" in rural areas (and also in mahalles within urban areas) were elected. In light of the controversy around the elections, it was viewed as a referendum on the government of Prime Minister Recep Tayyip Erdoğan. About 50 million people were eligible to vote.

A local government re-organisation took place before the election, lowering the total number of elected officials from 38,592 to 23,132. Almost 1,500 beldes (small municipal towns) had their municipalities abolished, meaning that a significantly fewer number of mayors were elected compared to the 2009 local elections. Most provinces no longer elect any provincial councillors. The number of metropolitan municipalities, however, rose from 16 to 30.

The elections were marred by allegations of electoral fraud and violence, with both opposition and ruling party candidates alike refusing to recognise a wide variety of results. Significant cases of fraud in Ankara and Yalova were referred to the Supreme Electoral Council of Turkey for reviewal. Allegations of misconduct included the untimely power cuts in several areas while the votes were being counted (claimed to be caused by cats entering transformers), intimidation by government forces such as the European Union Minister Mevlüt Çavuşoğlu and the Anatolian Agency in electorally strategic districts, the theft and burning of votes cast for opposition candidates and the recording of opposition votes as invalid or blank. The elections had been controversial due to allegations of government corruption, voter bribery and the lack of up-to-date voter records beforehand.

Regardless, the governing Justice and Development Party (AKP) declared victory in the early hours of 31 March, gaining 42.89% of the vote, 818 municipalities and 11,309 councillors. The opposition Republican People's Party (CHP) came second with 26.34%, 232 municipalities and 4,320 councillors, announcing that it would be filing complaints against alleged electoral manipulation. By 4 April 2014, numerous municipalities changed mayors following recounts. Gradual post-election revelations of alleged widespread irregularities in several cities sparked pro-democracy protests after provisional results were announced, while the Electoral Council declared results in some areas null and void. A repeat of the elections in these areas took place on 1 June. These most notably occurred in Yalova and Ağrı, in which the ruling AKP had lost by a small margin to the CHP and BDP respectively on March 30. In a first of a series of trials relating to electoral fraud claims, a returning officer was sentenced to five years in prison in June 2015 after being found guilty of transferring CHP votes to the AKP. It was the first time that women were elected as mayors to metropolitan areas in Turkey, namely Gültan Kışanak to Diyarbakir, Fatma Sahin to Gaziantep and Özlem Çerçioğlu to Aydın.

== Background ==
Turkish local elections are held every five years in order to elect mayors to 30 metropolitan municipalities, 1,008 district municipalities and 2,187 town municipalities. In addition, an excess of 53,450 neighbourhood leaders (muhtars) are elected, though most are non-partisan and do not have any declared political allegiance. Elderly and municipal council compositions were also elected through a separate ballot. The previous elections were held on 29 March 2009 and were won by Prime Minister Recep Tayyip Erdoğan's AKP with 38.8% of the vote.

=== Local government reform ===
Before the elections, the numbers of councillors and mayors were reduced during the 2013 Turkish local government reorganisation. During the reorganisation, 1,040 beldes were abolished, leaving the number of small town municipalities at 394 and contributing to the reduction in the number of mayors elected in 2014 in comparison to 2009.

The following table shows the numbers of metropolitan and district municipalities, as well as provincial and municipal councillors elected in 2009 and in 2014. In local elections, municipal mayors and councilors are the only partisan officials elected.

Office	Elected in 2009	Elected in 2014	Change
Metropolitan municipalities	16	30	▲14
District municipalities	2,903	1,351	▼1,552
Provincial councillors	3,281	1,251	▼2,030
Municipal councillors	32,392	20,500	▼11,892
Total	38,592	23,132	▼15,460

=== 2013–2014 anti-government protests ===
In 2013, a spate of anti-government protests and counter measures took place. The 2014 local elections are the first elections since the protests, and have thus been seen as a test for the government's popularity following a criticism both domestically and internationally for what was perceived to be a crackdown on peaceful protestors. The controversy surrounding the police response resulted in Germany seeking to delay European Union accession talks with Turkey.

=== 17 December corruption scandal ===
On 17 December 2013, police arrested several close associates and family members of government ministers as part of a corruption investigation. Prime Minister Erdoğan responded by either dismissing or reassigning thousands of police and judicial personnel while denying all allegations of wrongdoing.

A string of recorded phone calls between government ministers and close supporters allegedly discussing corruption were made public following the start of the corruption scandal. On 24 February 2014, a 10-minute phone call between Prime Minister Recep Tayyip Erdoğan and his son Necmettin Bilal Erdoğan were made public, in which the Prime Minister was warning his son of police searches in other government ministers' residences and telling him to "nullify" any cash which might be stored in their own. The tape caused particular damnation, after which CHP leader Kemal Kılıçdaroğlu advised the Prime Minister to "flee by helicopter." The Prime Minister responded by calling the tape a "montage," though this claim could not be verified by the national scientific development agency TÜBİTAK. It was reported that six people were removed from their roles at TÜBİTAK for refusing to falsify the recording, with one reporting that he was openly asked by superiors to manipulate reports related to the recordings.

Following the release, thousands took to the streets demanding the government's resignation. Protesters threw fake money in the air and also left empty shoe boxes near AKP offices, symbolising the US$4.5 million found stuffed into shoe-boxes at the home of Halkbank's former manager Süleyman Aslan Though protests were not as large as the June 2013 Gezi protests, the police were again criticised for a brutal crackdown.

=== Judiciary, Internet & MİT laws ===
The government responded to the tape revelations by pushing through three controversial laws which would tighten the AKP's grip on the judiciary, allow greater control over internet access, and increase the powers of Turkey's intelligence services (MİT). While some saw these laws as necessary to restore peace throughout the country and increase internet safety, the opposition accused the government for openly attempting to increase their powers in order to further defame the rule of law. Regardless, the AKP's sizeable parliamentary majority led to all laws being passed by the Turkish Grand National Assembly. The laws also caused a rift between Prime Minister Erdoğan and President Abdullah Gül, who criticised some aspects of the laws. Regardless of their differences, the President signed the bills into law despite speculation that he might veto them.

The new laws drew criticism from the public, with several demonstrators taking to the streets accusing the government of encroachments against their rights and privacy. Protestors again clashed with police, though the protests failed to materialise back to June 2013 levels.

=== Twitter and YouTube bans ===
On 20 March 2014, ten days before the elections, Prime Minister Erdoğan threatened to "wipe out" Twitter during an election rally in Bursa. Thousands of Turkish web users found that they could not access the site hours after the speech, with the government claiming that Twitter had failed repeatedly to adhere to Turkish court orders requiring the removal of some links. Despite causing outrage, the Twitter ban was almost completely overcome by users simply changing DNS settings. The government retaliated just a few days before the elections by blocking Google's DNS service, making defiance more difficult. Regardless, #erdoganblockedtwitter, #twitterisblockedinturkey and #turkeyblockedtwitter began trending worldwide soon after news of the ban was made public.

On 21 March 2014, Ankara's Attorney General issued a statement denying the government's claims that they had a court order validating the ban on Twitter. The ban's practical failure and its violation of internet freedoms received criticism, and the US House of Representatives was presented with two resolutions condemning the Turkish government for blocking Twitter and YouTube. On 2 April, 3 days after the elections, the Constitutional Court of Turkey issued a verdict annulling the Twitter ban for its violation of Article 26 (Freedom of Expression) of the Turkish Constitution.

On 28 March 2014, the telecommunications regulator (TİB) made use of the government's new controversial internet law by blocking YouTube without court order. The ban occurred shortly after the release and placing on YouTube of a recorded conversation allegedly between the deputy armed forces chief of staff Yaşar Güler, Foreign Minister Ahmet Davutoğlu, Foreign Ministry undersecretary Feridun Sinirlioğlu and Ministry of Intelligence Undersecretary Hakan Fidan. In the conversation, Fidan was allegedly recorded considering a deliberate act of military aggression against Syria in order to spark a war. While not confirming the validity of the recording, Prime Minister Erdoğan claimed that the making of the recording was "treacherous," and that YouTube had subsequently been blocked due to concerns for national security.

=== Pre-election rigging controversies ===
In the lead-up to elections, both the ruling AKP and opposition parties warned that preparations for substantial electoral fraud were being taken.

In December 2013, it emerged that several voters had been made members of different political parties without their approval in an attempt to bolster support without their consent. Voters affected appealed to the Prosecutor General's office after it emerged that their details had been used to register them.

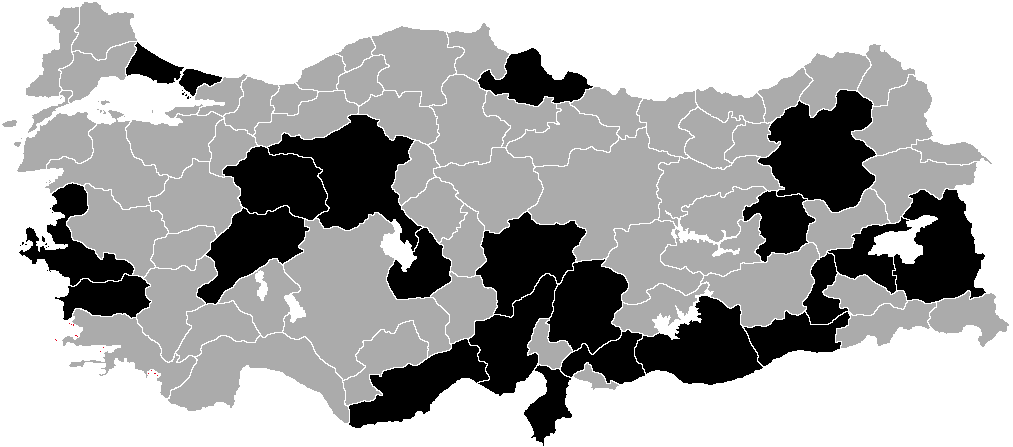
Map showing provinces suffering from electricity cuts during the counting process for the 2014 local elections

On 29 February 2014, a recording of a phone call between Ankara metropolitan mayor Melih Gökçek and the Prime Minister's secretary Mustafa Varank allegedly depicted both agreeing to censor the opposition CHP's election posters. The recording has not yet been proven to be either legitimate or fake.

Concerns were raised in Ankara as CHP metropolitan mayoral candidate Mansur Yavaş claimed that there were 58,000 duplicate records in Ankara alone that would allow select voters to vote twice. He also announced that his election team would do everything to prevent such manipulation. The MHP candidate Mevlüt Karakaya also called for voters and ballot officials to remain vigilant. Meanwhile, the incumbent AKP candidate Melih Gökçek accused "marginal groups" of plotting to rig the elections, blaming them for the AKP's losses in Ankara's Yenimahalle, Etimesgut and Gölbaşı districts in the 2009 elections. The provisional results in Ankara, which initially showed a 0.9% lead for the AKP, were widely criticised by the opposition and caused a massive recounting campaign by the CHP.

Turkish Newspaper Cumhuriyet claimed that the Supreme Electoral Council of Turkey (YSK) had printed 141,654,161 ballot papers despite an electorate formed of 52,695,831 voters. Some sources, including the YSK itself, put the number of ballot papers printed to between 144 and 151 million. The YSK responded by defending its decision, saying that it was required by law to send 15% more ballot papers extra to each ballot box. The YSK also re-iterated that more than one ballot paper was required per voter since different ballots were used to elect municipal mayors, muhtars and city councils. Nevertheless, members of the opposition raised concern on how the extra ballot papers would be utilised, with MHP MPs warning that the spare ballot papers would be used by the PKK to increase the votes of the pro-Kurdish BDP in the south-east.

Several controversies following the distribution of ballot papers to voter's residences before the elections raised concern about the validity of the YSK's voter records. Upon receiving extra ballot papers, several families complained to the YSK, claiming to have received more ballot papers than necessary. It was also observed that dead citizens were on the electoral roll, and several ballot papers had been sent to persons who had been dead for a considerable amount of time or false addresses which did not exist. On 15 March 2014, Ankara's AKP mayor Melih Gökçek spoke on live television regarding the possible use of Chinese temporary tattoo pens whilst recording the results from each ballot box. This would allegedly mean that some results would completely disappear shortly after being recorded, allowing "some groups" to edit the numbers while transporting the ballot result papers to the YSK. The opposition CHP candidate Mansur Yavaş replied by calling the mayor "paranoid," adding that he was a "mayor from the ruling party. Rather than announcing these allegations on television, he should be taking legal action."

On 29 March 2014, the police received a tip-off that large numbers of fake ballot papers were being stored at a printing press in the district of Gaziemir in İzmir. Despite conducting a detailed search of the compound, the police failed to find any fake votes. Despite reports by several news agencies, the allegations that a van full of ballot papers with a pre-printed "yes" vote for the AKP was impounded on in İzmir's Çınarlı district could not be verified due to a similar situation being reported before the 2011 general elections.

Another debate was on the voting rights of the 250,000 Syrian refugees living in Turkey due to the Syrian Civil War. The controversy began in late 2013 after the CHP's deputy leader Gürsel Tekin claimed that several refugees had been registered on the electoral roll. The Ministry of the Interior responded by stating that a non-citizen within Turkey had to wait five years before being eligible to vote. However, it emerged that several Syrian refugees had been made Turkish citizens already. While the opposition claimed that Syrian votes would be used to bolster AKP support due to their lax border policies, the government and the Association for Solidarity with Refugees denied these claims. Nevertheless, three Syrians were caught attempting to cast votes during the elections.

== Parties ==
The incumbent national party is the Justice and Development Party (AKP), and its principal opposition parties are the Republican People's Party (CHP) and Nationalist Movement Party (MHP). The Peace and Democracy Party (BDP) is a Kurdish party; the new left wing party, the Peoples' Democratic Party, is allied with it.

== Campaign ==
Large-scale election rallies dominated the pre-election political scene, mostly being held by the governing AKP and the main opposition CHP.

== Conduct ==
About 50 million people were eligible to vote in 1379 electoral sees. On election day, violence resulted in eight deaths. The Doğan news agency reported six deaths and four injuries in the village of Yuvacık in Şanlıurfa. It also reported that in Hatay rival families fought with clubs, knives and guns in support of their respective candidates resulting in two deaths and nine injuries. In the early hours of 31 March, 1,418 claims of electoral fraud were reported. Power cuts during the counting process in some provinces, as well as the publication of widely different results by different news agencies, also caused controversy.

== Results ==
Party	**Justice and Development Party**; AKP	**Republican People's Party**; CHP	**Nationalist Movement Party**; MHP	**Peace and Democracy Party**; BDP+HDP	**Felicity Party**; SP	**Great Union Party**; BBP
Leader	Recep Tayyip Erdoğan	Kemal Kılıçdaroğlu	Devlet Bahçeli	Selahattin Demirtaş (HDP)	Mustafa Kamalak	Mustafa Destici
Metropolitan Municipalities	18 (60.0%)	6 (20.0%)	3 (10.0%)	2 (6.7%)	0 (0.0%)	0 (0.0%)
Metropolitan Municipalities	18 / 30	6 / 30	3 / 30	2 / 30	0 / 30	0 / 30
District Municipalities	800 (59.2%)	226 (16.7%)	166 (12.3%)	97 (7.2%)	27 (2.0%)	6 (0.4%)
District Municipalities	800 / 1,351	226 / 1,351	166 / 1,351	97 / 1,351	27 / 1,351	6 / 1,351
Metropolitan Councillors	10,530 (51.4%)	4,161 (20.3%)	3,501 (17.4%)	1,441 (7.0%)	411 (2.0%)	165 (0.8%)
Metropolitan Councillors	10,530 / 20,498	4,161 / 20,498	3,501 / 20,498	1,441 / 20,498	411 / 20,498	165 / 20,498
Provincial Councillors	779 (62.3%)	159 (12.7%)	174 (13.9%)	129 (11.0%)	5 (0.3%)	4 (0.2%)
Provincial Councillors	779 / 1,251	159 / 1,251	174 / 1,251	129 / 1,251	5 / 1,251	4 / 1,251

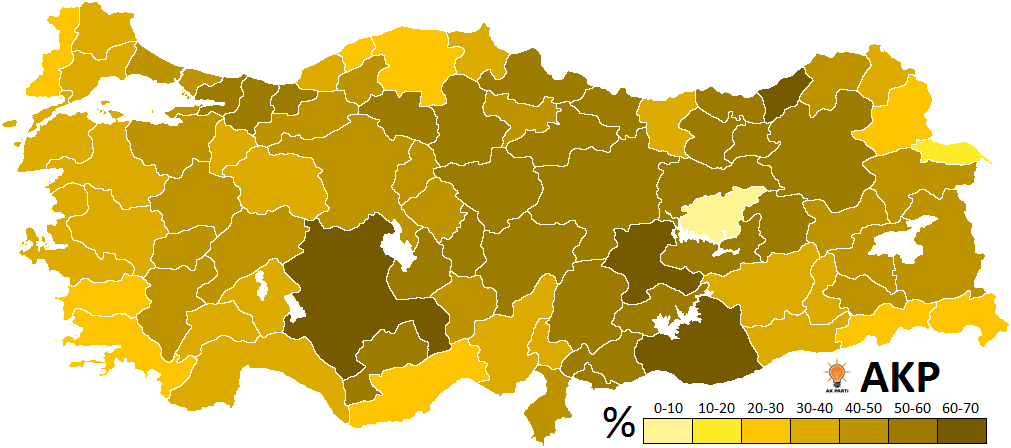
Results obtained by the AKP by province

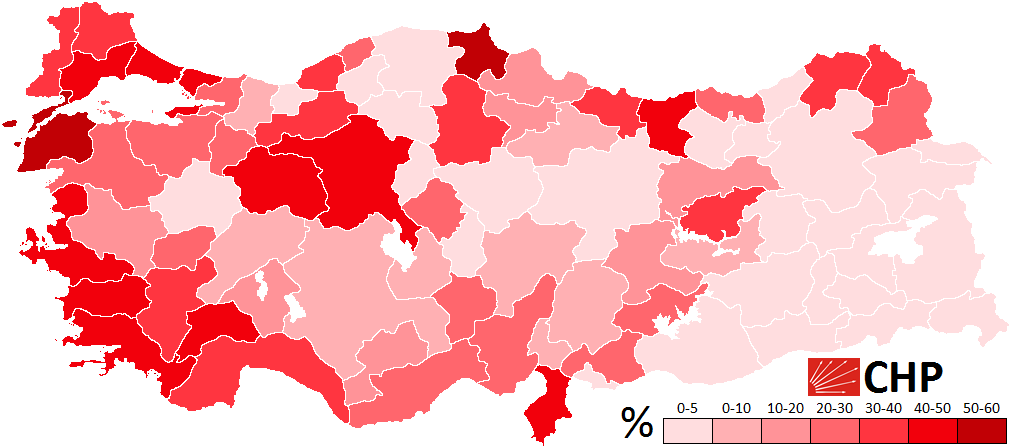
Results obtained by the CHP by province

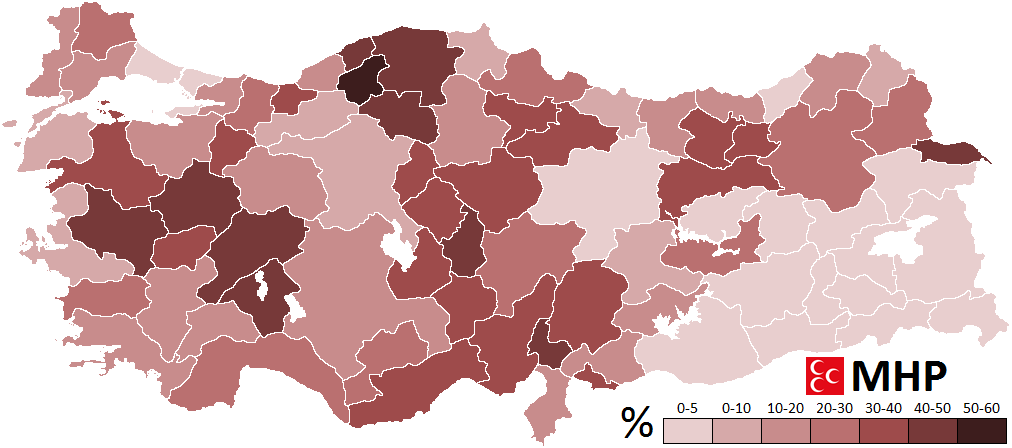
Results obtained by the MHP by province

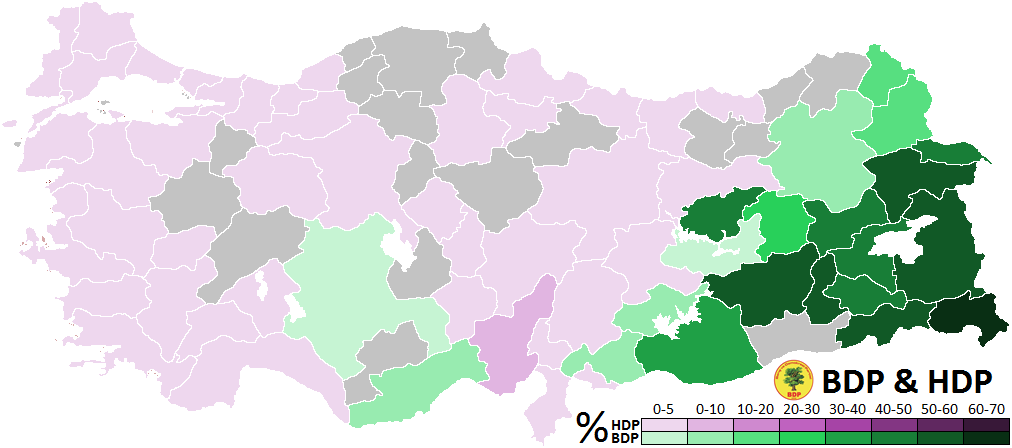
Results obtained by the BDP and the HDP by province

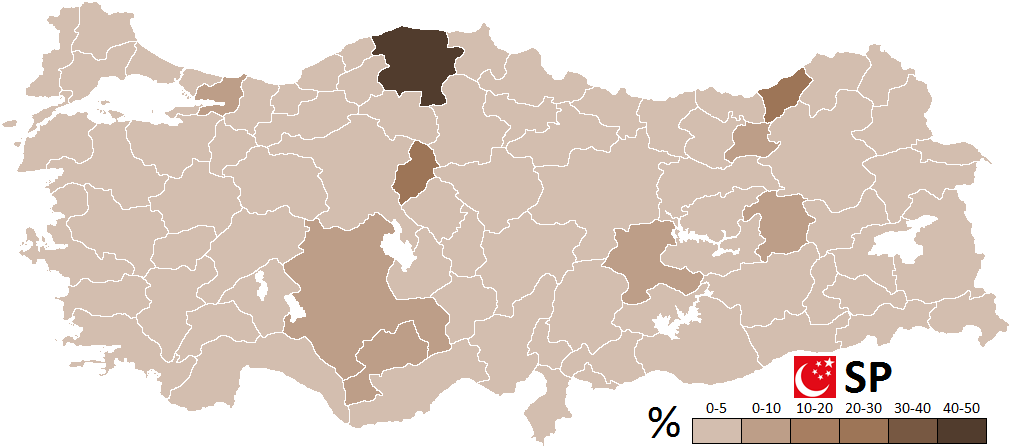
Results obtained by the SP by province

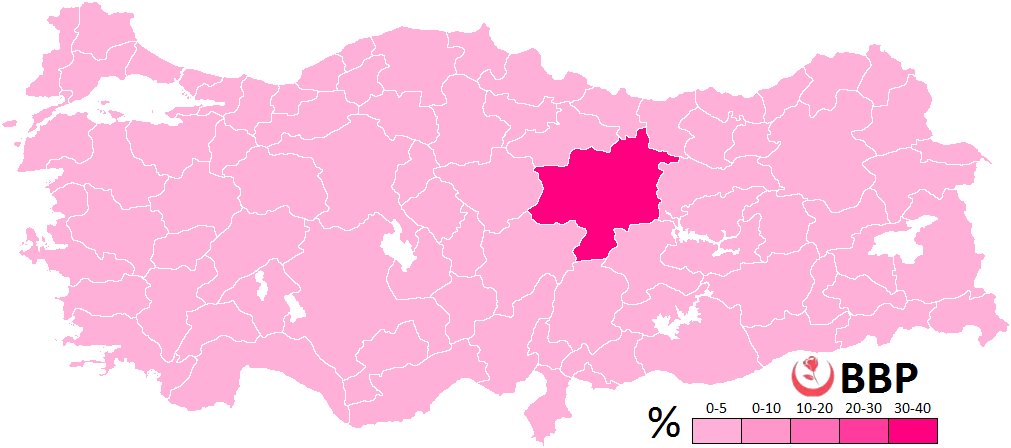
Results obtained by the BBP by province

Below are the results for the elected councillors and municipal mayors. The number of councillor and mayoral positions up for election in 2014 vary widely in comparison to 2009 (See the local government reform section or 2013 Turkish local government reorganisation). For this reason, the changes per party in terms of officials elected between 2009 and 2014 are not representative of party performance. Rather, the change in proportion of officials held per party is a more accurate comparison between party performances since 2009, however it should also be taken into account that the abolition or introduction of several elected officials in certain areas where particular parties are the strongest has also led to disproportionate changes.

=== Metropolitan municipality results ===
2014 metropolitan municipality mayoral results

Abbreviation	Party	Popular vote	Vote percentage	Swing	Metropolitan municipalities won	Proportion of mayors	Mayor change	Proportion swing
AKP	Justice & Development Party	15,898,025	45.54%	▲3.35%	18	60.00%	▲8	▼2.50%
CHP	Republican People's Party	10,835,876	31.04%	▼1.39%	6	20.00%	▲3	▲1.25%
MHP	Nationalist Movement Party	4,764,833	13.65%	▲1.28%	3	10.00%	▲2	▲3.75%
BDP	Peace and Democracy Party	1,079,026	3.09%	▼1.20%	2	6.67%	▲1	▲0.42%
HDP	Peoples' Democratic Party	817,494	2.34%	▲2.34%	0	0.00%	±0	±0.00%
SP	Felicity Party	579,231	1.66%	▼2.13%	0	0.00%	±0	±0.00%
BBP	Great Union Party	248,169	0.71%	▲0.07%	0	0.00%	±0	±0.00%
Ind.	Independents	206,029	0.59%	▲0.29%	1 (Ahmet Türk in Mardin)	3.33%	▲1	▲3.33%
DP	Democrat Party	73,530	0.21%	▼0.78%	0	0.00%	±0	±0.00%
BTP	Independent Turkey Party	63,567	0.18%	▼0.09%	0	0.00%	±0	±0.00%
HÜDA PAR	Free Cause Party	50,923	0.15%	▲0.15%	0	0.00%	±0	±0.00%
DSP	Democratic Left Party	50,506	0.14%	▼1.96%	0	0.00%	▼1	▼6.25%
İP	Workers' Party	42,315	0.12%	▲0.12%	0	0.00%	±0	±0.00%
HEPAR	Rights and Equality Party	40,448	0.12%	▲0.12%	0	0.00%	±0	±0.00%
HAK-PAR	Rights and Freedoms Party	32,081	0.09%	▲0.02%	0	0.00%	±0	±0.00%
DYP	True Path Party	29,727	0.09%	▲0.09%	0	0.00%	±0	±0.00%
YURT-P	Homeland Party	28,399	0.08%	▲0.08%	0	0.00%	±0	±0.00%
HKP	People's Liberation Party	26,381	0.08%	▲0.08%	0	0.00%	±0	±0.00%
MP	Nation Party	20,161	0.06%	±0.00%	0	0.00%	±0	±0.00%
TKP	Turkish Communist Party	11,385	0.03%	▼0.11%	0	0.00%	±0	±0.00%
TURK	Social Reconciliation Reform and Development Party	8,338	0.02%	▲0.02%	0	0.00%	±0	±0.00%
LDP	Liberal Democratic Party	7,272	0.02%	▼0.03%	0	0.00%	±0	±0.00%
ÖDP	Freedom and Solidarity Party	0	0.00%	▼0.01%	0	0.00%	±0	±0.00%
GP	Young Party	0	0	±0.00%	0	0.00%	±0	±0.00%
MYP	Conservative Ascension Party	0	0.00%	±0.00%	0	0.00%	±0	±0.00%
EMEP	Labour Party	0	0.00%	±0.00%	0	0.00%	±0	±0.00%
AL Parti	Alternative Party	0	0.00%	±0.00%	0	0.00%	±0	±0.00%

=== District municipality results ===
2014 district municipality mayoral results

Abbreviation	Party	Popular vote	Vote percentage	Swing	District municipalities won	Proportion of mayors	Mayor change	Proportion swing
AKP	Justice & Development Party	17,952,504	43.13%	▲4.49%	800	59.22%	▼642	▲9.55%
CHP	Republican People's Party	11,008,961	26.45%	▲1.75%	226	16,73%	▼277	▼0.60%
MHP	Nationalist Movement Party	7,391,458	17.76%	▲1.26%	166	12.29%	▼317	▼4.35%
BDP	Peace and Democracy Party	1,738,372	4.18%	▼0.98%	97	7.18%	▲1	▲3.87%
SP	Felicity Party	1,181,226	2.84%	▼2.53%	27	2.00%	▼53	▼0.76%
HDP	Peoples' Democratic Party	836,741	2.01%	▲2.01%	0	0.00%	±0	±0.00%
BBP	Great Union Party	592,296	1.42%	▲0.23%	6	0.44%	▼14	▼0.25%
DP	Democrat Party	311,947	0.75%	▼2.87%	14	1.04%	▼134	▼4.06%
DSP	Democratic Left Party	162,943	0.39%	▼2.48%	5	0.37%	▼55	▼1.70%
Ind.	Independents	103,388	0.25%	▼0.49%	5	0.37%	▼40	▼1.18%
BTP	Independent Turkey Party	96,707	0.23%	▼0.08%	0	0.00%	▼4	▼0.14%
HÜDA PAR	Free Cause Party	83,430	0.20%	▲0.20%	0	0.00%	±0	±0.00%
İP	Workers' Party	62,736	0.15%	▲0.15%	0	0.00%	±0	±0.00%
MP	Nation Party	18,589	0.04%	▲0.02%	1	0.07%	▲1	▲0.07%
HEPAR	Rights and Equality Party	17,605	0.04%	▲0.04%	0	0.00%	±0	±0.00%
LDP	Liberal Democratic Party	14,660	0.04%	▲0.01%	1	0.07%	▲1	▲0.07%
DYP	True Path Party	11,383	0.03%	▲0.03%	0	0.00%	±0	±0.00%
HAK-PAR	Rights and Freedoms Party	9,570	0.02%	±0.00%	1	0.07%	▲1	▲0.07%
YURT-P	Homeland Party	9,550	0.02%	▲0.02%	0	0.00%	±0	±0.00%
TKP	Turkish Communist Party	7,878	0.02%	▼0.07%	1	0.07%	▲1	▲0.07%
ÖDP	Freedom and Solidarity Party	4,516	0.01%	▼0.06%	1	0.07%	▼3	▼0.07%
TURK	Social Reconciliation Reform and Development Party	2,780	0.01%	▲0.01%	0	0.00%	±0	±0.00%
EMEP	Labour Party	455	0.00%	▼0.05%	0	0.00%	▼2	▼0.07%
HKP	Peoples' Liberation Party	103	0.00%	±0.00%	0	0.00%	±0	±0.00%
GP	Young Party	0	0	±0.00%	0	0.00%	±0	±0.00%
MYP	Conservative Ascension Party	0	0.00%	±0.00%	0	0.00%	±0	±0.00%
AL Parti	Alternative Party	0	0.00%	±0.00%	0	0.00%	±0	±0.00%

=== Municipal councillor results ===
2014 municipal councillor results

Abbreviation	Party	Popular vote	Vote percentage	Swing	Municipal councillors won	Proportion of councillors	councillor change	Proportion swing
AKP	Justice & Development Party	17,802,976	42.87%	▲4.71%	10,530	51.37%	▼4,202	▲5.89%
CHP	Republican People's Party	10,938,262	26.34%	▲1.50%	4,161	20.30%	▼1,964	▲1.39%
MHP	Nationalist Movement Party	7,399,119	17.82%	▲1.18%	3,501	17.08%	▼2,504	▼1.46%
BDP	Peace and Democracy Party	1,729,297	4.16%	▼1.10%	1,432	6.99%	▲263	▼1.34%
SP	Felicity Party	1,180,322	2.84%	▼2.80%	411	2.00%	▼670	▼0.76%
HDP	Peoples' Democratic Party	881,830	2.12%	▲2.12%	9	0.04%	▲9	▲0.04%
BBP	Great Union Party	628,729	1.51%	▼0.07%	165	0.80%	▼129	▼0.11%
DP	Democrat Party	287,209	0.69%	▼2.99%	164	0.80%	▼1,679	▼4.89%
DSP	Democratic Left Party	144,337	0.35%	▼2.60%	66	0.32%	▼708	▼2.07%
İP	Workers' Party	100,021	0.24%	▲0.23%	4	0.02%	▲3	▲0.02%
HÜDA PAR	Free Cause Party	87,726	0.21%	▲0.21%	6	0.03%	▲6	▲0.03%
BTP	Independent Turkey Party	82,768	0.20%	▲0.06%	8	0.04%	▼37	▼0.10%
TKP	Turkish Communist Party	60,298	0.15%	▲0.14%	6	0.03%	▲4	▲0.02%
Ind.	Independents	49,594	0.12%	▼0.02%	5	0.02%	▼9	▼0.02%
ÖDP	Freedom and Solidarity Party	45,204	0.11%	▲0.03%	4	0.02%	▼31	▼0.09%
HAK-PAR	Rights and Freedoms Party	35,256	0.08%	▲0.07%	6	0.03%	▲6	▲0.03%
HEPAR	Rights and Equality Party	34,125	0.08%	▲0.08%	0	0.00%	±0	±0.00%
MP	Nation Party	15,068	0.04%	▲0.02%	6	0.03%	▲4	▲0.02%
DYP	True Path Party	11,029	0.03%	▲0.03%	0	0.00%	±0	±0.00%
LDP	Liberal Democratic Party	9,122	0.02%	▲0.01%	12	0.06%	▲11	▲0.05%
YURT-P	Homeland Party	3,364	0.01%	▲0.01%	0	0.00%	±0	±0.00%
TURK	Social Reconciliation Reform and Development Party	1,242	0.00%	±0.00%	0	0.00%	±0	±0.00%
EMEP	Labour Party	489	0.00%	▼0.07%	2	0.01%	▼21	▼0.06%
HKP	People's Liberation Party	103	0.00%	±0.00%	0	0.00%	±0	±0.00%
GP	Young Party	0	0	±0.00%	0	0.00%	±0	±0.00%
MYP	Conservative Ascension Party	0	0.00%	±0.00%	0	0.00%	±0	±0.00%
AL Parti	Alternative Party	0	0.00%	±0.00%	0	0.00%	±0	±0.00%

=== Provincial councillor results ===
2014 provincial councillor results

Abbreviation	Party	Popular vote	Vote percentage	Swing	Provincial councillors won	Proportion of councillors	Councillor change	Proportion swing
AKP	Justice & Development Party	4,622,484	45.43%	▲7.04%	779	62.27%	▼1,110	▲4.70%
MHP	Nationalist Movement Party	2,107,357	20.71%	▲4.74%	174	13.91%	▼240	▲1.29%
CHP	Republican People's Party	1,716,720	16.87%	▼6.21%	159	12.71%	▼453	▼1.78%
BDP	Peace and Democracy Party	786,502	7.73%	▲2.03%	128	10.23%	▼107	▲3.07%
SP	Felicity Party	336,872	3.31%	▼1.89%	5	0.40%	▼24	▼0.48%
BBP	Great Union Party	231,726	2.28%	▼0.08%	4	0.32%	▼14	▼0.23%
DP	Democrat Party	104,733	1.03%	▼2.81%	0	0.00%	▼45	▼1.37%
Ind.	Independents	40,818	0.40%	▼0.03%	0	0.00%	▼7	▼0.21%
HDP	Peoples' Democratic Party	38,538	0.38%	▲0.38%	1	0.08%	▲1	▲0.08%
HÜDA PAR	Free Cause Party	37,918	0.37%	▲0.37%	0	0.00%	±0	±0.00%
BTP	Independent Turkey Party	35,363	0.35%	▼0.07%	0	0.00%	▼1	▼0.03%
DSP	Democratic Left Party	35,127	0.35%	▼2.50%	0	0.00%	▼26	▼0.79%
İP	Workers' Party	23,275	0.23%	▼0.06%	0	0.00%	±0	±0.00%
ÖDP	Freedom and Solidarity Party	17,335	0.17%	±0.00%	0	0.00%	±0	±0.00%
HAK-PAR	Rights and Freedoms Party	11,435	0.11%	▲0.04%	0	0.00%	±0	±0.00%
LDP	Liberal Democratic Party	10,162	0.10%	▲0.09%	0	0.00%	±0	±0.00%
TKP	Turkish Communist Party	7,653	0.08%	▼0.13%	1	0.08%	▲1	▲0.08%
MP	Nation Party	4,070	0.04%	▼0.10%	0	0.00%	±0	±0.00%
DYP	True Path Party	3,731	0.04%	▲0.04%	0	0.00%	±0	±0.00%
HEPAR	Rights and Equality Party	2,718	0.03%	▲0.03%	0	0.00%	±0	±0.00%
TURK	Social Reconciliation Reform and Development Party	285	0.00%	±0.00%	0	0.00%	±0	±0.00%
YURT-P	Homeland Party	204	0.00%	±0.00%	0	0.00%	±0	±0.00%
HKP	Peoples' Liberation Party	0	0.00%	±0.00%	0	0.00%	±0	±0.00%
GP	Young Party	0	0.00%	±0.00%	0	0.00%	±0	±0.00%
MYP	Conservative Ascension Party	0	0.00%	±0.00%	0	0.00%	±0	±0.00%
EMEP	Labour Party	0	0.00%	±0.00%	0	0.00%	▼1	▼0.03%
AL Parti	Alternative Party	0	0.00%	±0.00%	0	0.00%	±0	±0.00%

=== Results by province ===
The following results show winners by province as of 1 April 2014. Metropolitan provinces are in bold. AKP denotes provinces won by the Justice & Development Party, CHP denotes provinces won by the Republican People's Party, MHP denotes provinces won by the Nationalist Movement Party and BDP denotes provinces won by the Peace and Democracy Party.

Province	Party
**Adana**	MHP
Adıyaman	AKP
Afyonkarahisar	AKP
Ağrı	BDP
Amasya	AKP
**Ankara**	AKP
**Antalya**	AKP
Artvin	AKP
Aydın	CHP
**Balıkesir**	AKP
Bilecik	AKP
Bingöl	AKP
Bitlis	BDP
Bolu	AKP
Burdur	CHP
**Bursa**	AKP
Çanakkale	CHP

Province	Party
Çankırı	AKP
Çorum	AKP
**Denizli**	AKP
**Diyarbakır**	BDP
Edirne	CHP
Elazığ	AKP
Erzincan	AKP
**Erzurum**	AKP
**Eskişehir**	CHP
**Gaziantep**	AKP
Giresun	CHP
Gümüşhane	AKP
Hakkâri	BDP
**Hatay**	CHP
Isparta	MHP
**Mersin**	MHP
**Istanbul**	AKP

Province	Party
**İzmir**	CHP
Kars	MHP
Kastamonu	AKP
**Kayseri**	AKP
Kırklareli	CHP
Kırşehir	AKP
**Kocaeli**	AKP
**Konya**	AKP
Kütahya	AKP
**Malatya**	AKP
**Manisa**	MHP
**Kahramanmaraş**	AKP
**Mardin**	IND.
**Muğla**	CHP
Muş	AKP
Nevşehir	AKP
Niğde	AKP

Province	Party
**Ordu**	AKP
Rize	AKP
**Sakarya**	AKP
**Samsun**	AKP
Siirt	BDP
Sinop	CHP
Sivas	AKP
**Tekirdağ**	CHP
Tokat	AKP
**Trabzon**	AKP
Tunceli	BDP
**Şanlıurfa**	AKP
Uşak	AKP
**Van**	BDP
Yozgat	AKP
Zonguldak	CHP
Aksaray	AKP

Province	Party
Bayburt	AKP
Karaman	AKP
Kırıkkale	AKP
Batman	BDP
Şırnak	BDP
Bartın	MHP
Ardahan	AKP
Iğdır	BDP
Yalova	CHP
Karabük	MHP
Kilis	AKP
Osmaniye	MHP
Düzce	AKP

=== Complaints & recounts ===
Provisional results in several districts were contested by all major parties, including the governing AKP, claiming misconduct during the counting process and thus demanding a recount. Applications for recounts were made to the YSK shortly after the elections concluded. Turkey's Constitutional Court has rejected an individual application filed by Mansur Yavaş, the Republican People's Party's (CHP) candidate for mayor in Ankara.

== Electorate demographics ==
A survey of the Turkish electorate demographics by KONDA
		AKP	CHP	MHP	BDP & HDP	Total
Gender
Gender	Male	42	23	17	6	100
Gender	Female	41	25	11	5	100
Age
Age	18-28	36	23	18	10	100
Age	29-43	44	22	14	7	100
Age	>44	43	26	11	3	100
Education
Education	Illiterate	48	8	5	23	100
Education	Literate with no diploma	49	23	9	8	100
Education	Primary school	50	19	11	5	100
Education	Middle school	43	17	16	8	100
Education	High school	36	30	16	5	100
Education	University	29	35	17	1	100
Education	Master's degree	12	55	15	6	100
Income
Income	<₺700	42	18	11	15	100
Income	₺701-₺1200	47	17	12	9	100
Income	₺1201-₺2000	42	25	15	4	100
Income	₺2001-₺3000	40	30	14	3	100
Income	>₺3001	30	40	15	2	100
Employment
Employment	Civil servant	34	29	18	1	100
Employment	Private sector	33	30	19	1	100
Employment	Worker	40	23	17	13	100
Employment	Tradespeople	42	16	16	11	100
Employment	Retired	40	32	11	1	100
Employment	Housewife	48	20	9	7	100
Employment	Student	25	32	18	10	100
Employment	Unemployed	39	20	20	9	100
Ethnicity
Ethnicity	Turkish	42	26	16	<1	100
Ethnicity	Kurdish	42	6	4	39	100
Religion
Religion	Sunni Muslim	45	20	14	6	100
Religion	Alevi Muslim	9	69	5	6	100
Turkey		42	24	14	6	100

A survey of the Turkish electorate demographics by KONDA
		AKP	CHP	MHP	BDP	Turkey
Gender
Gender	Male	49	46	60	52	49
Gender	Female	51	54	40	48	51
Gender	Total	100	100	100	100	100
Age
Age	18-28	21	24	33	40	25
Age	29-43	37	31	35	34	34
Age	>44	42	45	32	26	41
Age	Total	100	100	100	100	100
Education
Education	Illiterate	6	2	2	21	5
Education	Literate with no diploma	2	2	1	3	2
Education	Primary school	44	30	30	26	37
Education	Middle school	15	10	16	21	14
Education	High school	24	34	33	24	28
Education	University	9	20	17	4	13
Education	Master's degree	0	2	1	1	1
Education	Total	100	100	100	100	100
Income
Income	<₺700	8	6	6	22	8
Income	₺701-₺1200	37	23	30	52	33
Income	₺1201-₺2000	35	36	38	21	35
Income	₺2001-₺3000	15	19	16	5	16
Income	>₺3001	7	15	10	0	9
Income	Total	100	100	100	100	100
Employment
Employment	Employed	36	37	46	37	38
Employment	Retired	14	19	12	4	15
Employment	Housewife	40	29	24	26	35
Employment	Student	5	11	11	14	8
Employment	Unemployed	4	3	6	7	4
Employment	Unable to work	1	0	1	2	1
Employment	Total	100	100	100	100	100
Ethnicity
Ethnicity	Turkish	81	88	92	3	80
Ethnicity	Kurdish	13	3	3	88	13
Ethnicity	Zaza	1	2	0	10	2
Ethnicity	Arab	1	2	0	0	1
Ethnicity	Other	4	5	4	0	4
Ethnicity	Total	100	100	100	100	100
Religion
Religion	Sunni Muslim	99	78	98	95	93
Religion	Alevi Muslim	1	18	2	3	6
Religion	Other	0	4	0	1	1
Religion	Total	100	100	100	100	100

== Detailed results by province ==
=== Metropolitan municipalities ===
The following articles document the results within the three main provinces of Turkey.

- 2014 Ankara mayoral election
- 2014 Istanbul mayoral election
- 2014 İzmir mayoral election

=== District municipalities ===
- 2014 Yalova mayoral election
- 2014 Hakkari mayoral election

== See also ==
- 2013 Turkish local government reorganisation
- Politics in Turkey
