= Results breakdown of the June 2015 Turkish general election =

This is the results breakdown of the general election held in Turkey on 7 June 2015.

== Overall result ==
Party	Votes	%	Seats	+/–
Justice and Development Party	18,867,411	40.87	258	–69
Republican People's Party	11,518,139	24.95	132	–3
Nationalist Movement Party	7,520,006	16.29	80	+27
Peoples' Democratic Party	6,058,489	13.12	80	+80
Felicity Party	949,178	2.06	0	0
Patriotic Party	161,674	0.35	0	New
Independent Turkey Party	96,475	0.21	0	New
Democratic Left Party	85,810	0.19	0	0
Democrat Party	75,784	0.16	0	0
Social Reconciliation Reform and Development Party	72,701	0.16	0	New
People's Liberation Party	60,396	0.13	0	New
Rights and Freedoms Party	58,716	0.13	0	New
True Path Party	28,852	0.06	0	0
Anatolia Party	27,688	0.06	0	New
Liberal Democrat Party	26,500	0.06	0	0
Centre Party	20,945	0.05	0	New
Nation Party	17,473	0.04	0	0
Communist Party	13,780	0.03	0	New
Homeland Party	9,289	0.02	0	New
Rights and Justice Party	5,711	0.01	0	New
Independents	488,226	1.06	0	–35
Total	46,163,243	100.00	550	0
Valid votes	46,163,243	97.17		
Invalid/blank votes	1,344,224	2.83		
Total votes	47,507,467	100.00		
Registered voters/turnout	56,608,817	83.92		
Source: YSK

== Nationwide results ==
=== Adana ===
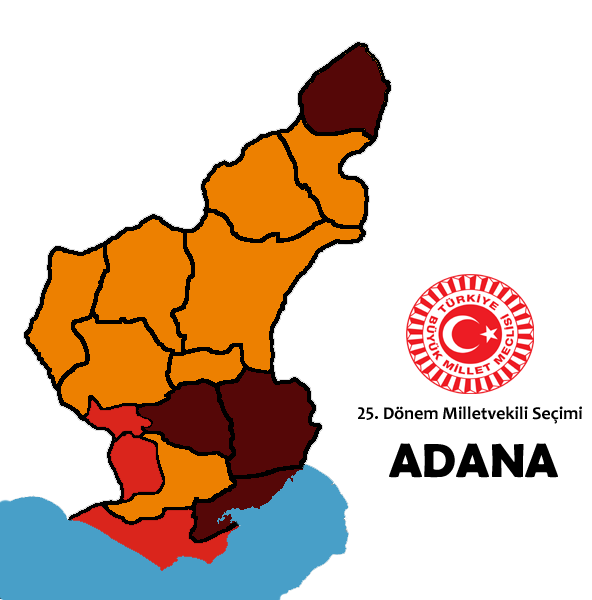
Winners according to districts

Vote share
AKP	30.38%
CHP	28.55%
MHP	23.08%
HDP	14.58%
SP	1.53%
Independents	0.40%
Others	1.48%

General Election June 2015: Adana
Party	Candidate	Votes	%	±%
AK Party	5 elected: 1. Necdet Ünüvar ✓; 2. Fatma Güldemet Sarı ✓; 3. Sadullah Kısacık ✓; 4. Talip Küçükcan ✓; 5. Mehmet Şükrü Erdinç ✓; 6. Esra Yalvaç ✗; 7. Mehmet Can ✗; 8. Mustafa Çalışkan ✗; 9. Asuman Tekin ✗; 10. Kasım Pamuk ✗; 11. Mehmet Faruk Bozkurt ✗; 12. Ramazan Demir ✗; 13. Mehmet Ay ✗; 14. Hasan Berzan Toprak	382,219	30.38	▼7.02
CHP	4 elected: 1. Elif Doğan Türkmen ✓; 2. Zülfikar İnönü Tümer ✓; 3. İbrahim Özdiş ✓; 4. Aydın Uslupehlivan ✗; 5. Mustafa Kemal Özkan ✗; 6. Müzeyyin Şevkin ✗; 7. Rıza Mete ✗; 8. Ahmet Adıgüzel ✗; 9. Abdullah Sedat Doğan ✗; 10. Rukiye Çinkılıç ✗; 11. Akif Kemal Akay ✗; 12. Mustafa Bilgilioğlu ✗; 13. Yüksel Karaaslan ✗; 14. Orhan Sümer	359,280	28.55	▼2.30
MHP	3 elected: 1. Mevlüt Karakaya ✓; 2. Muharrem Varlı ✓; 3. Seyfettin Yılmaz ✗; 4. Abdulkadir Yuvalı ✗; 5. Ali Aydın ✗; 6. Ali Demir ✗; 7. Demet Çardak ✗; 8. Sinan Gül ✗; 9. Mehmet Ali Arslan ✗; 10. Adem Güngoğan ✗; 11. Neslihan Uzun ✗; 12. İsa Ayanoğlu ✗; 13. Ayla Emrahoğlu ✗; 14. Burak Yiğenoğlu	290,428	23.08	▲2.76
HDP	2 elected: 1. Rıdvan Turan ✓; 2. Meral Danış Beştaş ✗; 3. Vedat Özkan ✗; 4. Beyhan Günyeli ✗; 5. Tugay Bek ✗; 6. Hatice Kavran ✗; 7. Barış Karabıyık ✗; 8. Feride Peynirci ✗; 9. İsmail Başaran ✗; 10. Nefise Balyemez ✗; 11. Reşit Ertaş ✗; 12. Kader Duman ✗; 13. Hıdır Koluman ✗; 14. Feyrüze Gümüş	183,491	14.58	▲14.58
SAADET	None elected: 1. Yakup Budak ✗; 2. Ahmet Şahin ✗; 3. İbrahim Öner ✗; 4. Rifat Örek ✗; 5. Hamza Çalışkan ✗; 6. Veli Şahin ✗; 7. Süleyman Şenogul ✗; 8. Mehmet Öztürk ✗; 9. Musa Aktaş ✗; 10. Yıldıray Sarı ✗; 11. İsmail Aktaş ✗; 12. Halil Rüzgar ✗; 13. Huzeyfe Turunç ✗; 14. Hakan Balcı	19,362	1.53	▼0.01
Independent	None elected: 1. Çağlayan Kaya ✗; 2. Ercan Altintop ✗; 3. Muhittin Demir ✗; 4. Refik Gül ✗; 5. Salih Demir ✗; 6. Yasin Türkoğlu ✗; 7. Mustafa Süha Aşlamaci ✗; 8. Gülcan Ay ✗	5,013	0.40	▼7.55
Patriotic	None elected: 1. Mehmet Turgut Okyay ✗; 2. Zeynep Serap Baltacı ✗; 3. Hayyrettin Çavuşoğlu ✗; 4. Dilek Kartal ✗; 5. Emine Coşkun ✗; 6. Selver Kaplan ✗; 7. Aynur Yıldar ✗; 8. Hüseyin İçen ✗; 9. Sadık Boral ✗; 10. Mustafa Muhittin Zeyneloğlu ✗; 11. Selma Gündüzalp ✗; 12. İsa Çakan Dalgıç ✗; 13. Beysun Tankut ✗; 14. Abdurrahim Köylü ✗	3,907	0.31	▲0.31
TURK Party	None elected: 1. Esabil Gül ✗; 2. Seher Çoban ✗; 3. Kemal Ayanoğlu ✗; 4. Osman İşbilir ✗; 5. Emrah Üstünel ✗; 6. Mehmet Emmioğlu ✗; 7. Sebahattin Bülbül ✗; 8. Ahmet Çiten ✗; 9. Ercan Arica ✗; 10. Asude Çetin ✗; 11. Müşerref Kökçen ✗; 12. Asuman Güler ✗; 13. Özlem Bahar Altintaş ✗; 14. Kerem Yüceşan ✗	2,223	0.17	▲0.17
DSP	None elected: 1. Ercan Akarpınar ✗; 2. Hakan Buldu ✗; 3. Birsen Bölükbaşi ✗; 4. Remzi Zeren ✗; 5. Ali Şardaşlar ✗; 6. Hüdaverdi Gökçe ✗; 7. Süleyman Yurdacan ✗; 8. Seyla Uydan ✗; 9. Mustafa Hazar ✗; 10. Tülay Aksu ✗; 11. Talat Çavuş ✗; 12. Ehter Suiçmez ✗; 13. Cumali Baran ✗; 14. Mustafa Yilmaz ✗	1,941	0.15	▼0.03
BTP	None elected: 1. Ahmet Oskar Haznadar ✗; 2. Recep Taşkın ✗; 3. Ahmet Topacıkilk ✗; 4. Gülüzar Yardim ✗; 5. Ünalyardim ✗; 6. Emine Songül Er ✗; 7. Azize Sökmen ✗; 8. Ahmet Mumcu ✗; 9. Afacan Kemal Can ✗; 10. Volkan Pomak ✗; 11. Güllü Nuroğlu ✗; 12. Halil Kurantürk ✗; 13. Aysun Doğrusöz ✗; 14. Burcu Balcı ✗	1,774	0.14	▲0.14
DP	None elected: 1. Hakan Topaloğlu ✗; 2. Celal Topaloğlu ✗; 3. Yalçın Mete ✗; 4. Muhammet Emin Atasever ✗; 5. Baha İspir ✗; 6. Jale Hiçyakmazer ✗; 7. Doğan Kiper Ulusoy ✗; 8. Hülya Tufan ✗; 9. Gülay Sezgin ✗; 10. Metehan Yaman ✗; 11. Alper Tükenmez ✗; 12. Emrah Şahin ✗; 13. İbrahim Buran ✗; 14. Hasan Hüseyin Bakır ✗	1,549	0.12	▼0.43
HKP	None elected: 1. Ayşe Küçükosmanoğlu ✗; 2. Zekeriya Erten ✗; 3. Mesut Küçükosmanoğlu ✗; 4. Mehmet Tahir ✗; 5. Hüseyin Özgür ✗; 6. Fatma Dalgıç ✗; 7. Ekrem Yıldız ✗; 8. Osman Akmeşe ✗; 9. Duygu Ün ✗; 10. Züleyha Karahan ✗; 11. Birol Alp ✗; 12. Ali Demir ✗; 13. Muharrem Can ✗; 14. İbrahim Kolcu ✗	1,481	0.11	▲0.11
HAK-PAR	None elected: 1. Arif Sevinç ✗; 2. Düzgün Kaplan ✗; 3. Medine Kaplan Bulut ✗; 4. Süleyman Kart ✗; 5. Deniz Koç ✗; 6. Derya Burkay ✗; 7. İsmail Yıldız ✗; 8. Ferman Hoşgül ✗; 9. Müzaffer Adıyaman ✗; 10. Yıldız Çimen ✗; 11. Müzeyyen Oral ✗; 12. Siddika Akçan ✗; 13. Kasım Kahriman ✗; 14. Emine Bektaş ✗	1,308	0.10	▲0.10
DYP	None elected: 1. Mustafa Güler ✗; 2. Şeref Uluç ✗; 3. Veli Erdem ✗; 4. Elif Büyükdoğan ✗; 5. Mansur Göktaş ✗; 6. Burak Erdem ✗; 7. Muzaffer Çakmak ✗; 8. Levent Erenkul ✗; 9. Teyfik Targan ✗; 10. Filiz Yaman ✗; 11. Taylan Alan ✗; 12. Feyyaz Taştan ✗; 13. Erol Güvenç ✗; 14. İlyas Birkoş ✗	1,135	0.09	▼0.09
LDP	None elected: 1. Hüseyin Taciroğlu ✗; 2. Ülkü Reyhanioğlu ✗; 3. Özgür Karakök ✗; 4. Gülnaz Cenger ✗; 5. Fevzi Çebiş ✗; 6. Alev Erkek ✗; 7. Fatma Kocahal ✗; 8. Bülent Demirdüzen ✗; 9. Kerem Kutlu ✗; 10. Ayşe Taciroğlu ✗; 11. Yalçın Gürpınar ✗; 12. Hilal Keleş ✗; 13. Aytaç Bakırcıoğlu ✗; 14. Osman Aksu ✗	979	0.07	▲0.04
Centre	None elected: 1. Uğur Aksöz ✗; 2. Mustafa Nadir Mayaoğlu ✗; 3. Mahmut Hocaoğlu ✗; 4. Hakan Erdoğan ✗; 5. Zülfikar Pamuk ✗; 6. Çiğdem Akça ✗; 7. Ayşe Cingöz Arpdağ ✗; 8. Menderes Yildiz ✗; 9. Timur Tüküner ✗; 10. Şerife Gül Çiğner ✗; 11. Veysel Özkan ✗; 12. Özgür Öngören ✗; 13. Salim Turgut ✗; 14. Ali Çağlayan ✗	652	0.05	▲0.05
AnaParti	None elected: 1. Namik Akay ✗; 2. Necati Erdem ✗; 3. İlker Gezerşen ✗; 4. Necdet Çömelek ✗; 5. Mehmet Gül ✗; 6. Nüket Özev ✗; 7. Serpil İloğlu ✗; 8. Miyase Tenik ✗; 9. Gülay Kandemir ✗; 10. Zeliha Tekeli ✗; 11. Özden Koca ✗; 12. İsmail Pehlivan ✗; 13. Onur Elma ✗; 14. Ferudun Güleryüz ✗	608	0.04	▲0.04
MP	None elected: 1. Mustafa Kabcı ✗; 2. Ramazan Dönmez ✗; 3. Ali Geçioğlu ✗; 4. Noman Tufan ✗; 5. Hasan Demircioğlu ✗; 6. Memet Demir ✗; 7. Nevzat Metin ✗; 8. Ali Örün ✗; 9. Mehmet Şen ✗; 10. Salih Yaşayan ✗; 11. Fadime Şahin ✗; 12. Ahmet Örün ✗; 13. Ramazan Bolat ✗; 14. Ali Şirin ✗	514	0.04	▼0.14
Communist	None elected: 1. Deniz Ercan ✗; 2. İnci Saritürk ✗; 3. Fatma Öztürk ✗; 4. Elife Erdoğan ✗; 5. Buket Öztürk ✗; 6. Derya Medine Görkem ✗; 7. Hatun Oçak ✗; 8. İlkay Berber ✗; 9. Feryat Ataş ✗; 10. Şenay Mermi ✗; 11. Kader Azeri Özalp ✗; 12. Zekiye Alpçoğay ✗; 13. Güney Kuzu ✗; 14. Neriman Eratalay ✗	318	0.02	▲0.02
Total votes		1,258,204		
Rejected ballots		24,553	1.91	▼0.10
Turnout		1,282,757	84.52	▼0.80

=== Adıyaman ===
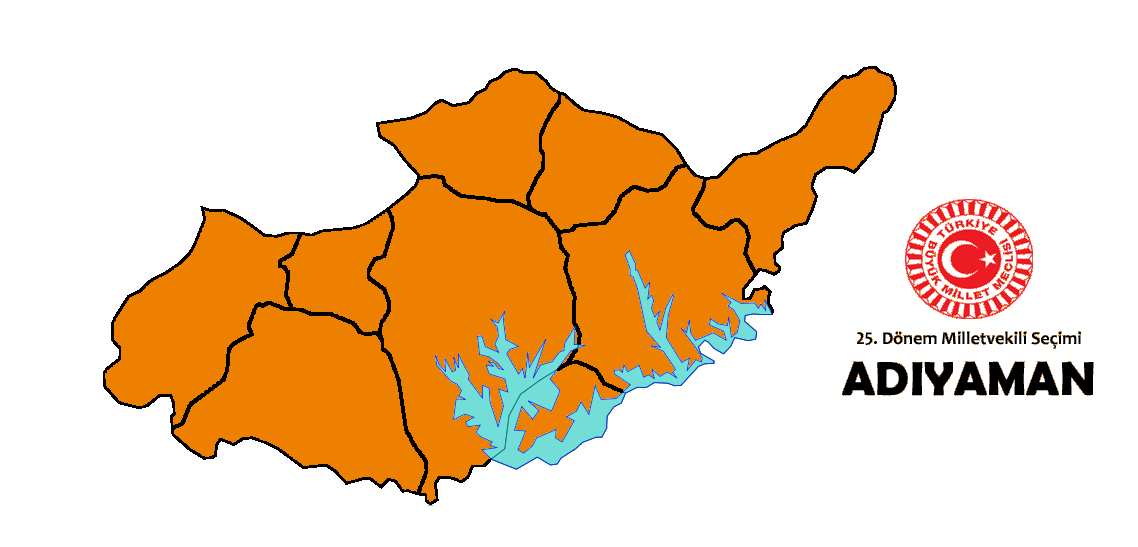
Winners according to districts

Vote share
AKP	58.00%
HDP	22.63%
CHP	11.48%
MHP	4.33%
SP	1.95%
TURK Party	0.35%
Others	1.26%

General Election June 2015: Adıyaman
Party	Candidate	Votes	%	±%
AK Party	4 elected: 1. Ahmet Aydın ✓; 2. Adnan Boynukara ✓; 3. İbrahim Halil Fırat ✓; 4. Salih Fırat ✗; 5. İclal Yalçın ✗	181,918	58.00	▼9.30
HDP	1 elected: 1. Behçet Yıldırım ✗; 2. Ferhat Temel ✗; 3. Ayten Yılmaz ✗; 4. Yasin Tahta ✗; 5. Birsen Tunç ✗	70,979	22.63	▲16.13
CHP	None elected: 1. Mehmet Selçuk Tabak ✗; 2. Abdurrahman Tutdere ✗; 3. Fatma Ulubey ✗; 4. Mehmet Karahan ✗; 5. Karip Bozkurt ✗	36,003	11.48	▼5.11
MHP	None elected: 1. Recep Kılıç ✗; 2. Vakkas Orhan ✗; 3. Remziye Yavuz ✗; 4. Ahmet Kara ✗; 5. Mehmet İnan ✗	13,601	4.33	▼0.28
SAADET	None elected: 1. Mehmet Fatih ✗; 2. Erdem Aslancan ✗; 3. Ramazan Özbey ✗; 4. Ali Salik ✗; 5. Bekir Durmuş ✗	6,119	1.95	▲0.33
TURK Party	None elected: 1. Şahin Bozkurt ✗; 2. Şükrü Uludağ ✗; 3. Sevilay Mumcu ✗; 4. Hilmi Keskin ✗; 5. Tuğba Şulan ✗	1,112	0.35	▲0.35
BTP	None elected: 1. Mustafa Doğan ✗; 2. Serpil Hanbay ✗; 3. Sevgi Mürvet Arslan ✗; 4. Sema Ekşi ✗; 5. Elif Belkiran ✗	644	0.20	▲0.20
DSP	None elected: 1. Zeki Boyraz ✗; 2. Üzeyir Yıldırım ✗; 3. İbrahim Durmaz ✗; 4. Ümit Karabulut ✗; 5. Bülent Sarmak ✗	550	0.17	▲0.02
HAK-PAR	None elected: 1. Ali Arslan ✗; 2. Ali Tetik ✗; 3. Hasan Göçer ✗; 4. Vakkas Gezer ✗; 5. Habeş Göçer ✗	439	0.13	▲0.13
HKP	None elected: 1. Seher Yıldız ✗; 2. Ali Kılıç ✗; 3. Alaattin Alp ✗; 4. Erkan Sarıoğlu ✗; 5. Döndü Ayna ✗	437	0.13	▲0.13
DYP	None elected: 1. Musa Bayrak ✗; 2. Pelin Tanrıverdi ✗; 3. Mehmet Gözükara ✗; 4. Ömer Atlı ✗; 5. İdris Yıldırım ✗	347	0.11	▲0.03
Patriotic	None elected: 1. Mustafa Kabarcık ✗; 2. Zeki Tunç ✗; 3. Hanifi Koca ✗; 4. Ahmet Serkan Çelikten ✗; 5. Memet Yılmaz ✗	376	0.11	▲0.11
DP	None elected: 1. Rağibe Yağdı ✗; 2. İbrahim Salhan ✗; 3. Celal Ulu ✗; 4. Murat Kınacı ✗; 5. Remziye Yalçin ✗	307	0.09	▼0.21
HAP	None elected: 1. Mustafa Çağlayan ✗; 2. Fayik Arslan ✗; 3. Bahattin Yalçin ✗; 4. Mehmet Akin ✗; 5. Abidin Berk ✗	245	0.07	▲0.07
Centre	None elected: 1. Niyazi Bilgili ✗; 2. Mehmet Veysel Uzun ✗; 3. Abdulkadir Orman ✗; 4. Hakan Demirel ✗; 5. Mevlüt Türkmen ✗	202	0.06	▲0.06
MP	None elected: 1. Yusuf Coşkun ✗; 2. Mustafa Berkkaya ✗; 3. Mehmet Karakaya ✗; 4. Hacı Kubilay ✗; 5. İbrahim Halil Emrullah ✗	104	0.03	▼0.08
LDP	None elected: 1. Bozan Öztürk ✗; 2. Gaffar Karakuş ✗; 3. Ferhat Marangoz ✗; 4. Mahmut Kaplan ✗; 5. Mehmet Kaba ✗	91	0.03	0.00
AnaParti	None elected: 1. Bülent Tufan ✗; 2. Ahmet Turan ✗; 3. Ali Bildi ✗; 4. Naci Günaydın ✗; 5. İlkay Palavan ✗	79	0.02	▲0.02
Communist	None elected: 1. Ayşe Vural ✗; 2. Yeşim Çellik ✗; 3. Ayşe Pehlivan ✗; 4. Fatma Ayaz ✗; 5. Hülya Neşe Uzuner ✗	54	0.01	▲0.01
Total votes		313,638		
Rejected ballots		6.878	2.15	▼0.83
Turnout		320,516	82.27	▼2.76

=== Afyonkarahisar ===
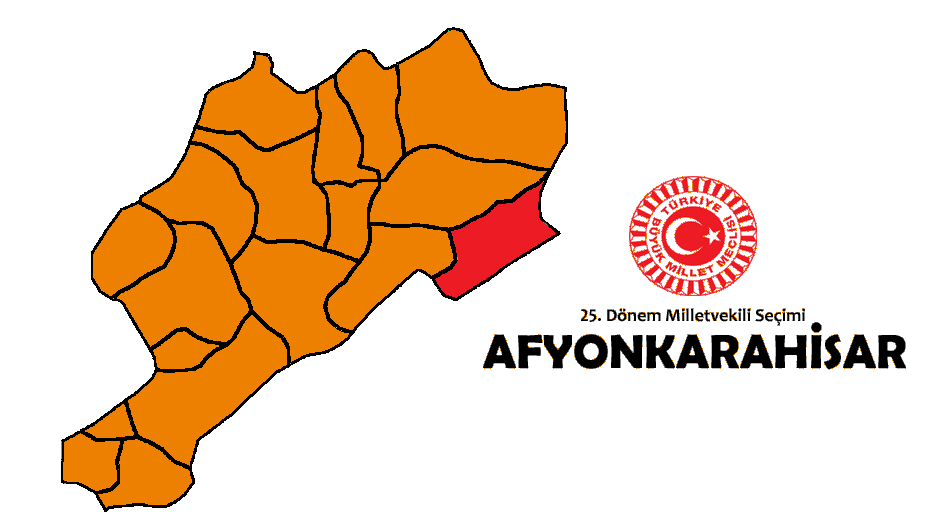
Winners according to districts

Vote share
AKP	52.30%
MHP	25.09%
CHP	16.75%
SP	2.17%
HDP	1.48%
Democrat	0.50%
Others	1.71%

General Election June 2015: Afyonkarahisar
Party	Candidate	Votes	%	±%
AK Party	3 elected: 1. Halil Ürün ✓; 2. Ali Özkaya ✓; 3. Remziye Sıvacı ✗; 4. Akif Özkaldı ✗; 5. Fatih Beder ✗	227,360	52.30	▼8.12
MHP	1 elected: 1. Mehmet Parsak ✓; 2. Aziz Aslan ✗; 3. Fatih Çetinkaya ✗; 4. İsmail Elibol ✗; 5. Abdil Demiral ✗	109,083	25.09	▲6.45
CHP	1 elected: 1. Burcu Kayıkçı ✓; 2. Mehmet Ali Ecer ✗; 3. Mehmet Tuğrul Akkuş ✗; 4. Yalçın Görgöz ✗; 5. Bekir Kasap ✗	72,821	16.75	▲0.27
SAADET	None elected: 1. Halit Kuş ✗; 2. Süleyman Çağlar ✗; 3. Yaşar Karakaya ✗; 4. Bekir Daldal ✗; 5. Mehmet Akkoyun ✗	9,419	2.17	▲0.35
HDP	None elected: 1. Remzi Yaşar Dikmenyildiz ✗; 2. Cavidan Nizamoğlu ✗; 3. Vedat Kaya ✗; 4. Müge Yamanyılmaz ✗; 5. İsmail Kaçmaz ✗	6,437	1.48	▲1.48
DP	None elected: 1. İhsan Dinçay Doğar ✗; 2. Aslan Sayın ✗; 3. İbrahim Ölmez ✗; 4. Asuman Umut ✗; 5. Erdal Ünsoy ✗	2,192	0.50	▼0.23
TURK Party	None elected: 1. Hüseyin Kızıltaş ✗; 2. Fuat Çalışkan ✗; 3. Müge Samsa ✗; 4. Kamil Elgin ✗; 5. Gülay Kılıç ✗	1,738	0.40	▲0.40
DSP	None elected: 1. Şerafettin Erdinç Özdil ✗; 2. Murat Karanfil ✗; 3. Taner Kutlu ✗; 4. Mahmut Bayram ✗; 5. Erhan Demir ✗	1,307	0.30	▲0.11
HKP	None elected: 1. Emine Şahbaz ✗; 2. Gökmen Esgin ✗; 3. Serdal Doğan ✗; 4. Hakan Çelik ✗; 5. Hatice Kara ✗	1,129	0.26	▲0.26
Patriotic	None elected: 1. Levent Tekkaya ✗; 2. Hafize Çobanoğlu Güngör ✗; 3. Hüseyin Karanlık ✗; 4. Halil Şahin ✗; 5. Ziya Öztürk ✗	940	0.22	▲0.22
BTP	None elected: 1. Ahmet Demirer ✗; 2. Musa Koç ✗; 3. Feyza Gültekin ✗; 4. Uğur Pak ✗; 5. Sidika Akçın ✗	736	0.17	▲0.17
DYP	None elected: 1. Canan Atasayar ✗; 2. Erdoğan Elbeyoğlu ✗; 3. Gülüm Özlok ✗; 4. Sadef Şen ✗; 5. Hümeyra Çiçek ✗	536	0.12	▼0.18
MP	None elected: 1. Himmet Kasal ✗; 2. Abdullah Kiraz ✗; 3. Sedat Yıldırım ✗; 4. Abdulkadir Çakiroğlu ✗; 5. Hüseyin Akçay ✗	393	0.09	▼0.06
Centre	None elected: 1. Muhammet Yalçin ✗; 2. Ahmet Ördek ✗; 3. Gökhan Darcan ✗; 4. Ercan İpeksümer ✗; 5. Emrah Veysel Kılıçaslan ✗	295	0.07	▲0.07
AnaParti	None elected: 1. Fahrettin Tuğrul ✗; 2. Ersan İçöz ✗; 3. Necdet Erdoğan ✗; 4. Gökhan Bayraktar ✗; 5. Birgül Keser ✗	214	0.05	▲0.05
Communist	None elected: 1. Zeliha Özkan ✗; 2. Demet Tutçali ✗; 3. Selda Aydemir ✗; 4. Naciye Göksun Özhan ✗; 5. Fatma Sinemce ✗	64	0.01	▲0.01
HAK-PAR	No candidates	15	0.00	▲0.00
HAP	No candidates	6	0.00	▲0.00
LDP	No candidates	4	0.00	▲0.00
YP	No candidates	2	0.00	▲0.00
Total votes		434,691		
Rejected ballots		3,135	0.72	▼1.64
Turnout		437,826	88.62	▼1.36

=== Ağrı ===
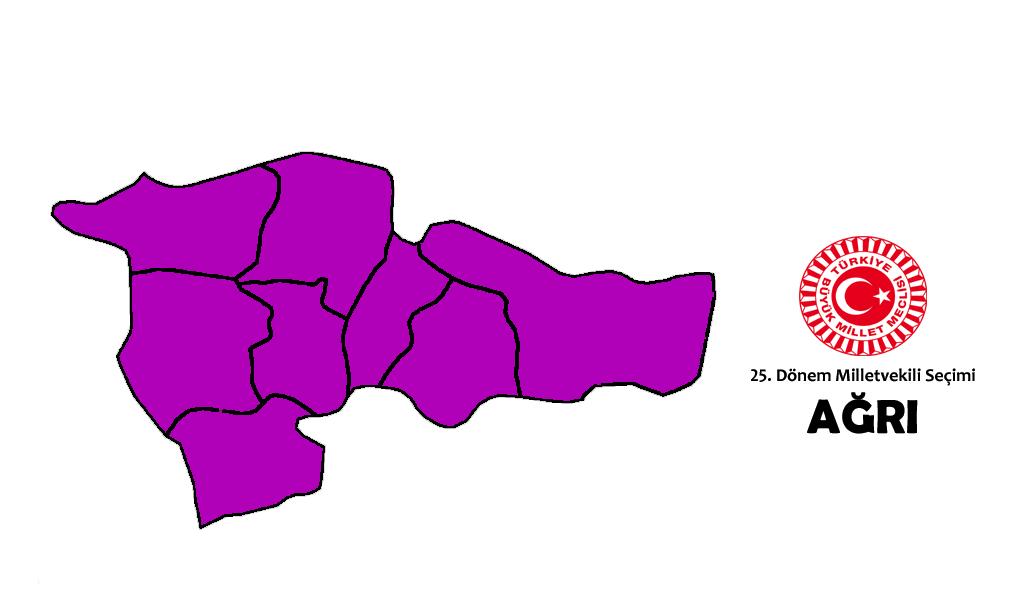
Winners according to districts

Vote share
HDP	76.91%
AKP	16.63%
MHP	2.72%
CHP	1.35%
Independent	0.82%
SP	0.58%
Others	0.99%

General Election June 2015: Ağrı
Party	Candidate	Votes	%	±%
HDP	4 elected: 1.Leyla Zana ✓ 2.Berdan Öztürk ✓ 3.Dirayet Taşdemir ✓ 4.Mehmet Emin İlhan ✓	186,617	76.91	▲76.91
AK Party	None elected: 1.Abdullah Atalay ✗ 2.Yılmaz Ensaroğlu ✗ 3.Halil Özyolcu ✗ 4.Ali Konyar ✗	40,353	16.63	▼30.99
MHP	None elected: 1.Mustafa Örü ✗ 2.Bilal Yaşar ✗ 3.Murat Çiftçi ✗ 4.Memet Yıldırım ✗	6,593	2.72	▲0.50
CHP	None elected: 1.Cemil Erhan ✗ 2.Muhammed Nidai Özmen ✗ 3.Mehmet Sıddık Yel ✗ 4.Erkan Sayan ✗	3,283	1.35	▼0.87
Independent	None elected: 1.Cemal Kaya ✗	1,994	0.82	▼42.07
SAADET	None elected: 1.Bora Erim ✗ 2.Ömer Akbulut ✗ 3.Mehmet Faruk Çetinel ✗ 4.İdris Yıldırım ✗	1,398	0.58	▼1.68
BTP	None elected: 1.Hayri Şahin ✗ 2.Rıdvan Tokgöz ✗ 3.Şakir Belli ✗ 4.Sema Hitaloğlu ✗	633	0.26	▲0.26
TURK Party	None elected: 1.Gökmen Kılıç ✗ 2.Ümit Özalp ✗ 3.Kerim Elgin ✗ 4.Fatih Çubuk ✗	453	0.19	▲0.19
HAK-PAR	None elected: 1.Haluk Öztürk ✗ 2.Yusuf Demir ✗ 3.Şahin Atmaca ✗ 4.Recep Çelik ✗	342	0.14	▲0.14
HKP	None elected: 1.Türkmen Pala ✗ 2.Mustafa Demirci ✗ 3.Çetin Özcan ✗ 4.Recep Çelenk ✗	341	0.14	▲0.14
DSP	None elected: 1.Ercan Aksoy ✗ 2.Metin Batmaz ✗ 3.Hasan Özmen ✗ 4.Hakan Demir ✗	225	0.09	▼0.43
AnaParti	None elected: 1.Canan Alpaslan ✗ 2.Gökhan Alpaslan ✗ 3.Metin Demirtaş ✗ 4.Gökhan Dağabakan ✗	107	0.04	▲0.04
DP	None elected: 1.Neşat Tirimoğulları ✗ 2.Cevdet Erciyas ✗ 3.Sabahattin Menderes Koçer ✗ 4.Halit Eken ✗	103	0.04	▼0.40
Patriotic	None elected: 1.Özay Gökçe ✗ 2.Sinan Özkara ✗ 3.Nadide Zehra Öztürk ✗ 4.Emine İnci Ölmez ✗	94	0.04	▲0.04
MP	None elected: 1.Hıdır Turan ✗ 2.Mehmet Örün ✗ 3.Ayhan Başbekleyen ✗ 4.Nigar Örün ✗	58	0.02	▼0.10
Communist	None elected: 1.Gülçin Sancak ✗ 2.Fatma Güzin Beşe ✗ 3.Havise Atlıhan ✗ 4.Pelin Nerse ✗	35	0.01	▲0.01
DYP	No candidates	7	0.00	▼0.13
HAP	No candidates	3	0.00	▲0.00
Centre	No candidates	2	0.00	▲0.00
LDP	No candidates	2	0.00	▲0.00
YP	No candidates	1	0.00	▲0.00
Total votes		242,644		
Rejected ballots		3,962	1.64	▼0.99
Turnout		241,134	82.66	▲7.90

=== Aksaray ===
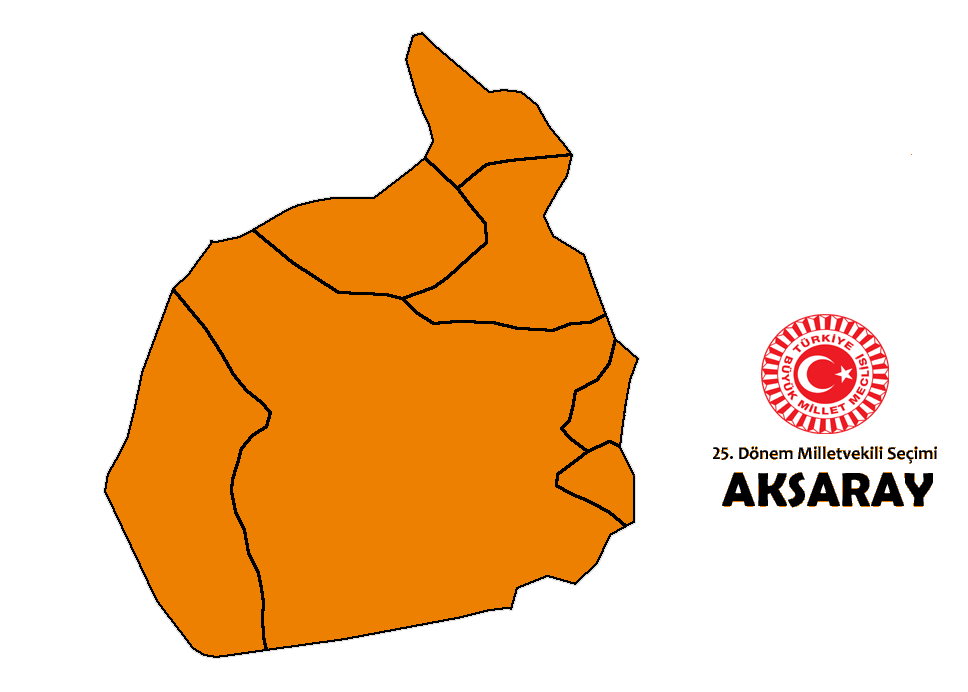
Winners according to districts

Vote share
AKP	58.31%
MHP	29.86%
CHP	6.93%
HDP	2.12%
SP	1.32%
DSP	0.26%
Others	1.20%

General Election June 2015: Aksaray
Party	Candidate	Votes	%	±%
AK Party	2 elected: 1.İlknur İnceöz ✓ 2.Nevzat Palta ✓ 3.Hüseyin Hüyük ✗	122,256	58.31	▼7.78
MHP	1 elected: 1.Turan Yaldır ✓ 2.Mustafa Tuğrul Karacaer ✗ 3.Kılıçaslan Ekin ✗	62,609	29.86	▲11.88
CHP	None elected: 1.Mehmet Öztürk ✗ 2.Haşmet Tekin Ökçe ✗ 3.Mehmet Ali Topaç ✗	14,520	6.93	▼4.79
HDP	None elected: 1.Bircan Duman ✗ 2.İsmail Doygun ✗ 3.Bahar Göncü ✗	4,447	2.12	▲2.12
SAADET	None elected: 1.Ahmet Karaman ✗ 2.Yusuf Çekiç ✗ 3.Muhammet Boztoprak ✗	2,765	1.32	▼0.63
DSP	None elected: 1.Mustafa Tosun ✗ 2.Sevil Tırank ✗ 3.Adnan Dökmez ✗	535	0.26	▲0.11
HKP	None elected: 1.Nebile Yıldız Özçelik ✗ 2.Adem Polat ✗ 3.Hüseyin Ceylan ✗	485	0.23	▲0.23
BTP	None elected: 1.Vahit Belge ✗ 2.Melek Demir ✗ 3.Derya Oymak ✗	448	0.21	▲0.21
HAK-PAR	None elected: 1.Cemal Özay ✗ 2.Yunus Örkmez ✗ 3.Cuma Tarak ✗	369	0.18	▲0.18
DP	None elected: 1.Servet Ceylan ✗ 2.Hakan Çetin ✗ 3.Ramazan Ok ✗	300	0.14	▼0.39
Patriotic	None elected: 1.Armağan Beştepe ✗ 2.Atila Karakor ✗ 3.Fatma Tülin Vidinligil ✗	262	0.12	▲0.12
Centre	None elected: 1.Oğuzhan Düzel ✗ 2.Sema Kırtıl ✗ 3.Mustafa Akar ✗	148	0.07	▲0.07
MP	None elected: 1.Ali Ünal ✗ 2.Haşim Akkurt ✗ 3.Zekeriya Etmiş ✗	145	0.07	▼0.03
DYP	None elected: 1.Hüseyin Çimen ✗ 2.Sabri Karatepe ✗ 3.Hamza Koska ✗	143	0.07	▼0.13
HAP	None elected: 1.İbrahim Halil Kipriksiz ✗ 2.Süleyman Ersan ✗ 3.Pervin Orha ✗	78	0.04	▲0.04
AnaParti	None elected: 1.Hakan Demirkılınç ✗ 2.Gülsüm Yetim ✗ 3.Hicran Başdil ✗	77	0.04	▲0.04
YP	None elected: 1.Bayram Şibil ✗ 2.Sercan Demir ✗ 3.Mustafa Alper Güven ✗	47	0.02	▲0.02
Communist	None elected: 1.Duygu Sezer ✗ 2.Mefharet Akcan ✗ 3.Hülya Çakmak ✗	34	0.02	▲0.02
TURK Party	No candidates	4	0.00	▲0.00
LDP	No candidates	2	0.00	▲0.00
Total votes		209,674		
Rejected ballots		5,020	2.39	▲0.69
Turnout		214,694	82.38	▼0.13

=== Amasya ===
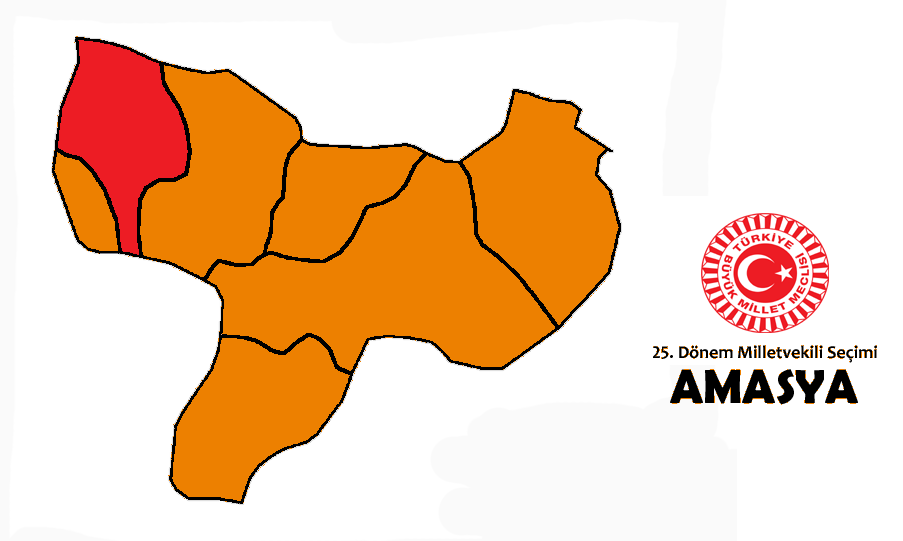
Winners according to districts

Vote share
AKP	45.87%
CHP	26.01%
MHP	22.62%
SP	2.22%
HDP	1.61%
TURK Party	0.35%
Others	1.32%

General Election June 2015: Amasya
Party	Candidate	Votes	%	±%
AK Party	2 elected: 1.Mehmet Naci Bostancı ✓ 2.Sait Yüce ✓ 3.Hasan Ali Cesur ✗	98,331	45.87	▼6.49
CHP	1 elected: 1.Mustafa Tuncer ✓ 2.Ramis Topal ✗ 3.Devrim Ersoy ✗	55,767	26.01	▼1.99
MHP	None elected: 1.Mehmet Sarı ✗ 2.Sadık Aslan ✗ 3.Turan Gürdoğan ✗	48,485	22.62	▲7.55
SAADET	None elected: 1.Hasan Arslan ✗ 2.Levent Şenol ✗ 3.Murat Danışkan ✗	4,768	2.22	▼0.27
HDP	None elected: 1.Naciye Çiğdem Atalay ✗ 2.Nurettin Alkan ✗ 3.Mustafa Irmak ✗	3,447	1.61	▲1.61
TURK Party	None elected: 1.Emek Bozkurt ✗ 2.Ahmet Ceylan ✗ 3.Derya Açıl ✗	750	0.35	▲0.35
HAK-PAR	None elected: 1.Vasıf Kahraman ✗ 2.Faysal Balaban ✗ 3.Serap Deli ✗	429	0.20	▲0.20
DSP	None elected: 1.Hüseyin Yaylıcıoğlu ✗ 2.Kenan Bardakcı ✗ 3.Seyit Ali Atılgan ✗	425	0.20	▲0.07
DP	None elected: 1.Salih aşçı ✗ 2.İlhan Şeker ✗ 3.Muzaffer Harputlu ✗	366	0.17	▼0.50
Patriotic	None elected: 1.Mehmet Ersoy ✗ 2.Serdar Demir ✗ 3.Hacı Şentürk ✗	328	0.15	▲0.15
HKP	None elected: 1.Türkan Bayyar ✗ 2.Bayram Çakır ✗ 3.Bülent Gök ✗	299	0.14	▲0.14
BTP	None elected: 1.Harun Uysal ✗ 2.Osman Tanrıverdi ✗ 3.Ahmet Kahriman ✗	279	0.13	▲0.13
LDP	None elected: 1.Hüseyin Yıldırım ✗ 2.Sinan Köse ✗ 3.Esra Yıldırım ✗	162	0.08	▲0.05
DYP	None elected: 1.İlker Bilgin ✗ 2.Mualla Kutlu ✗ 3.Ezgi Öğünç ✗	161	0.08	▼0.11
MP	None elected: 1.Mehmet Küçüköner ✗ 2.Osman Coşkun ✗ 3.Hayrettin Öztürk ✗	83	0.04	▼0.01
Centre	None elected: 1.Mehmet Doğru ✗ 2.Hacı Ömer Kaleli ✗ 3.Aliekber Bakır ✗	80	0.04	▲0.04
AnaParti	None elected: 1.Gülay Puletin ✗ 2.İbrahim Bozoğlan ✗ 3.Özer Buğdacı ✗	77	0.04	▲0.04
HAP	None elected: 1.Tamer Selçuk ✗ 2.İbrahim Halil Bayram ✗ 3.Selim Açar ✗	66	0.03	▲0.03
YP	None elected: 1.Ferhat Cebioğlu ✗ 2.Emre Murat Gedikoğlu ✗ 3.Özcan Duran ✗	51	0.02	▲0.02
Communist	None elected: 1.Elif Erkmen ✗ 2.Hacer İncekulak ✗ 3.Hale Yıldırım ✗	32	0.01	▲0.01
Total votes		214,386		
Rejected ballots		4,337	1.98	▲0.19
Turnout		218,723	89.64	▼2.02

=== Ankara ===
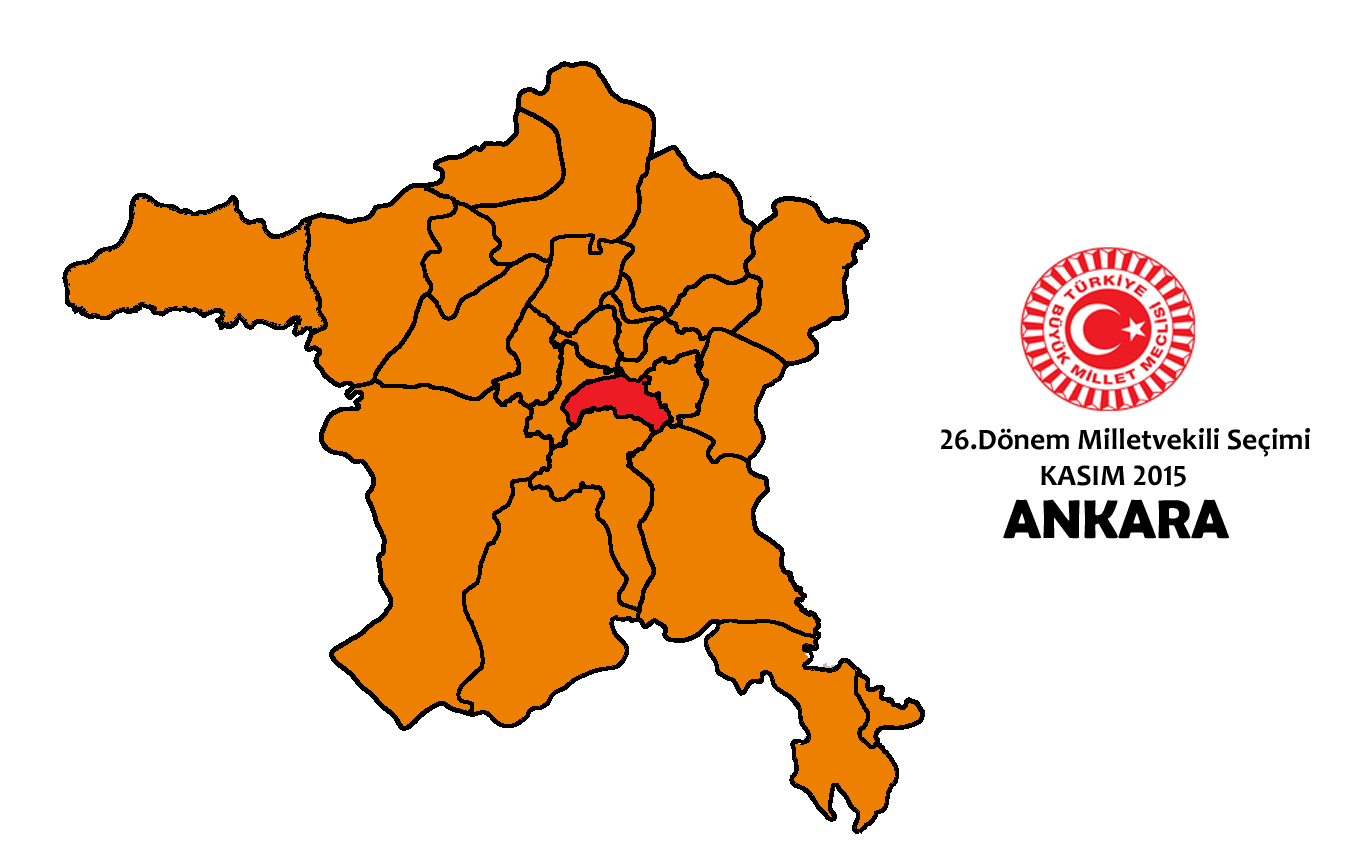
Winners according to districts

Vote share
AKP	41.40%
CHP	29.17%
MHP	17.82%
HDP	5.57%
Independents	2.57%
SP	1.86%
Others	1.61%

General Election June 2015: Ankara
Party	Candidates standing			Votes			Seats won			
Party	1st	2nd	Total	Number	%	swing	1st	2nd	Total elected	±
AK Party	18	14	32	1,357,423	41.40	▼7.84	7	8	15 / 32	▼2
CHP	18	14	32	956,295	29.17	▼2.13	7	4	11 / 32	▲1
MHP	18	14	32	584,267	17.82	▲3.20	3	2	5 / 32	▲1
HDP	18	14	32	182,664	5.57	▲5.57	1	0	1 / 32	▲1
Independents	8	6	14	84,319	2.57	▲1.57	0	0	0 / 32	0
Felicity	18	14	32	60,887	1.86	▲0.07	0	0	0 / 32	0
Patriotic	18	14	32	16,172	0.49	▲0.49	0	0	0 / 32	0
BTP	18	14	32	8,289	0.25	▲0.25	0	0	0 / 32	0
Democratic Left	14	18	32	5,423	0.16	0.00	0	0	0 / 32	0
TURK Party	18	14	32	5,167	0.68	▲0.68	0	0	0 / 32	0
Democrat	18	14	32	2,883	0.17	▼0.27	0	0	0 / 32	0
HKP	14	18	32	2,403	0.07	▲0.07	0	0	0 / 32	0
HAK-PAR	18	14	32	2,237	0.07	▲0.07	0	0	0 / 32	0
ANAPAR	14	18	32	2,133	0.07	▲0.07	0	0	0 / 32	0
Liberal Democrat	14	18	32	2,063	0.06	▲0.03	0	0	0 / 32	0
Homeland	14	18	32	1,808	0.06	▲0.06	0	0	0 / 32	0
Communist	14	18	32	1,271	0.04	▲0.04	0	0	0 / 32	0
Centre	14	18	32	1,182	0.04	▲0.04	0	0	0 / 32	0
DYP	0	14	14	842	0.03	▼0.07	0	0	0 / 32	0
HAP	0	0	0	43	0.00	▲0.00	0	0	0 / 32	0
Total				3,278,477	100.00	Steady	14	18	32	▲1
Rejected ballots				61,485	1.84	▲0.10				
Turnout				3,339,962	88.15	▼0.78				
AK Party hold Majority				401,128	12.24	▼5.80				

==== 1st electoral district ====
Vote share
AKP	36.64%
CHP	33.18%
MHP	18.06%
HDP	6.53%
Independent	2.26%
SP	1.72%
Others	1.61%

General Election June 2015: Ankara (I)
Party	Candidate	Votes	%	±%
AK Party	7 elected: 1. Yalçın Akdoğan ✓; 2. Ahmet Gündoğdu ✓; 3. Ali İhsan Arslan ✓; 4. Jülide Sarıeroğlu ✓; 5. Murat Alparslan ✓; 6. Ertan Aydın ✓; 7. Tülay Selamoğlu ✓; 8. Fatih Şahin ✗; 9. Muhammet Emin Zararsız ✗; 10. Hasan Albayrak ✗; 11. Ercan Kınacı ✗; 12. Barış Aydın ✗; 13. Murat Köse ✗; 14. Hasan Karagöz ✗; 15. Hatice Demirtaş ✗; 16. Haydar Şahin ✗; 17. Fatma Coşar Karacan ✗; 18. Mehmet Ali Canlı ✗	673,831	36.64	▼8.16
CHP	7 elected: 1. Ayşe Gülsün Bilgehan ✓; 2. Necati Yılmaz ✓; 3. Tekin Bingöl ✓; 4. Aylin Nazlıaka ✓; 5. Levent Gök ✓; 6. Ali Haydar Hakverdi ✓; 7. Bülent Kuşoğlu ✓; 8. Hikmet Tepe ✗; 9. Gamze Taşçıer ✗; 10. Emre Doğan ✗; 11. Selahattin Emre ✗; 12. Durdu Özbolat ✗; 13. Sema Aksoy ✗; 14. Kazım Sönmez ✗; 15. Faruk Özdemir ✗; 16. Erdoğan Kılıç ✗; 17. Birsen Temir ✗; 18. İlyas Güven Eroğlu ✗	610,227	33.18	▼2.40
MHP	3 elected: 1. Yıldırım Tuğrul Türkeş ✓; 2. Zühal Topcu ✓; 3. Mustafa Erdem ✓; 4. Erkan Haberal ✗; 5. Nevzat Aypek ✗; 6. Bircan Akyıldız ✗; 7. Sultan Gündüz ✗; 8. Ayşe Sibel Ersoy ✗; 9. İbrahim Çiftçi ✗; 10. Aytaç Özel ✗; 11. Esin Gürel ✗; 12. Şener Beşiroğlu ✗; 13. Şahin Önalan ✗; 14. Umutcan Günerkaya ✗; 15. Ali Keleş ✗; 16. Ülkü Gök Güven ✗; 17. Pınar Gülsoy ✗; 18. İbrahim Kuş ✗	332,095	18.06	▲3.28
HDP	1 elected: 1. Sırrı Süreyya Önder ✓; 2. Serkan Özkan ✗; 3. Songül Erol Abdil ✗; 4. Perihan Kiraz ✗; 5. Firdevs Kantar ✗; 6. Celal Demir ✗; 7. Zelal Deniz Demir ✗; 8. Mehmet Tekin Okay ✗; 9. İsmehan Sarıateş ✗; 10. Burcu Yıldırım ✗; 11. Bülent Durukan ✗; 12. Nursel Güvendir ✗; 13. Emin Çarbuğa ✗; 14. Sündüs Keleş ✗; 15. Hüseyin Ataş ✗; 16. Ahmet Demirel ✗; 17. Nazik Kılıç ✗; 18. Abdülkani Tatlısu ✗	120,043	6.53	▲6.53
Independent	None elected: Ahmet Yalavaç Çağlar Çağanlar Ercan Yenal Faruk Arslandok Mehmet Oktay Kallioğlu Melek Altıntaş Nazmi Ardıç Tufan Sevim ✗	41,559	2.26	▼1.06
SAADET	None elected: 1. Remzi Çayır ✗; 2. Tevfik Eren ✗; 3. Samet Sami Temel ✗; 4. Gökhan Tüzün ✗; 5. İsrafil Bayrakci ✗; 6. Hikmet Karaca ✗; 7. Ersan Bilgin ✗; 8. Orhan Şahin ✗; 9. Yusuf Sunar ✗; 10. Fatıma Bağçeci ✗; 11. Zübeyt Bozkurt ✗; 12. Abdurrahman Yılmaz ✗; 13. Ali İhsan Kayaaslan ✗; 14. Fazlı Centilmen ✗; 15. İrfan Akbayır ✗; 16. Barış Ezer ✗; 17. Yasin Şen ✗; 18. Ali Çırak ✗	31,653	1.72	▲0.10
Patriotic	None elected: 1. İsmail Hakkı Pekin ✗; 2. Fatma Mehpare Çelik ✗; 3. Nusret Senem ✗; 4. Hamit Zafer Kars ✗; 5. Hasan Fırat Kayaönü ✗; 6. Ahmet Sevük ✗; 7. Evren Mumcu ✗; 8. Halime Tosun ✗; 9. Funda Çakar ✗; 10. Ali Sami Utku ✗; 11. Hasan Dülgeroğlu ✗; 12. Meltem Türkoğlu ✗; 13. Tülay Toraman ✗; 14. Uğur Akgül ✗; 15. Mustafa Su ✗; 16. Yalçın Mıhçı ✗; 17. Erkan Yaykır ✗; 18. Nazım Yardım ✗	11,136	0.61	▲0.61
BTP	None elected: 1. Ata Selçuk ✗; 2. Salih Türkyılmaz ✗; 3. Murat Özilhan ✗; 4. Lütfullah Önder ✗; 5. İzzet Yaşar ✗; 6. Aydın İlik ✗; 7. Mevlüt Emre Vona ✗; 8. Nuri Hacıevliyagil ✗; 9. Ayvaz Adıgüzel ✗; 10. Sibel Kılıç ✗; 11. Abidin Uluyol ✗; 12. Caner Yatar ✗; 13. Fatma Göksel ✗; 14. Yunus Atıf Akkaya ✗; 15. Ertuğrul Patır ✗; 16. Fahri Yılmaz ✗; 17. Hakan Şireci ✗; 18. Saadet Doğan ✗	4,115	0.22	▲0.22
DSP	None elected: 1. Hasan Erçelebi ✗; 2. Mehmet Necati Utkan ✗; 3. Hasan Uğurtürk ✗; 4. İbrahim Halil Yumuşak ✗; 5. Dilek Dengizek Ersanal ✗; 6. Narin Ertekin ✗; 7. Mübehher Özbek ✗; 8. Çetin Ayberkin ✗; 9. Zehra Sema Okutan ✗; 10. Namık Kaya ✗; 11. Eren Kılıç ✗; 12. Zafer Gürleyen ✗; 13. Tülay Kandemir ✗; 14. Yasemin Atay ✗; 15. Tuğçe Tekçe ✗; 16. İsmet Sarıkaya ✗; 17. Hasan Kaya ✗; 18. Ayşe Bölükbaşı ✗	2,627	0.14	▼0.03
TURK Party	None elected: 1. Şaha Elif Ergin ✗; 2. Güliz Bayramoğlu ✗; 3. Nilüfer Zübeyde Yirmibeşoğlu ✗; 4. Kazım Yıldırım ✗; 5. İlker Uras ✗; 6. Mürsel Yurtlu ✗; 7. Dilber Sarıkaya ✗; 8. Hande Balcı ✗; 9. Özkan Akgün ✗; 10. Mustafa Kubaşık ✗; 11. Gökçe Taşkıran ✗; 12. Mehmet Karabulut ✗; 13. Ümmügül Şimşek ✗; 14. Ahmet Durgut ✗; 15. Yıldız Kılıç ✗; 16. Ömer Ateş ✗; 17. Haci Koyunsever ✗; 18. Zekeriya Ayakci ✗	2,371	0.13	▲0.13
DP	None elected: 1. Mehmet Özdemir ✗; 2. Birol Gökçe ✗; 3. Muzaffer Babadağ ✗; 4. Arif Varmış ✗; 5. Abdurrahman Özdere ✗; 6. Fatih Yıldız ✗; 7. Ömer Sabri Yolaş ✗; 8. Ömer Şenöz ✗; 9. Yavuz Gökhan Uluser ✗; 10. Selahattin Karakaya ✗; 11. Erkut Kubat ✗; 12. Sedat Apaydın ✗; 13. Fatma Şükran Gümüş ✗; 14. Kerim Bilgehan ✗; 15. Şerafettin Yener ✗; 16. Güler Kurt ✗; 17. Fahrettin Gün ✗; 18. İsa Bulut ✗	1,674	0.09	▼0.31
AnaParti	None elected: 1. Emine Ülker Tarhan ✗; 2. Pınar Akgül Doğusoy ✗; 3. Nedim Çekmen ✗; 4. Engin Balım ✗; 5. Nafiz Şahin ✗; 6. Buğra Şengün ✗; 7. Kübra Zuhal ✗; 8. Ahmet Volkan Arpacı ✗; 9. Emine Gül Savcı ✗; 10. Nilay Burçoğlu ✗; 11. Fatma Hicran Bilir ✗; 12. Nurdan Özdemir ✗; 13. Ümit Tazegül ✗; 14. İrem Geylani ✗; 15. Koray Güleçin ✗; 16. Esin Fatma Arıöz ✗; 17. İlkay Eski ✗; 18. Bayram Ateş ✗	1,452	0.08	▲0.08
HKP	None elected: 1. Azime Ayça Alpel ✗; 2. Sait Kıran ✗; 3. Selahaddin Kalkan ✗; 4. Emirali Karadoğan ✗; 5. Kubilay Akçay ✗; 6. Meliha Kuşçu ✗; 7. Şükrü Avşaroğlu ✗; 8. Doğan Erkan ✗; 9. Gizem Türker ✗; 10. Selçuk Akbina ✗; 11. Mustafa Bayyar ✗; 12. Sultan Caner ✗; 13. Gülay Bozgun ✗; 14. Erdoğan Öner ✗; 15. Türkan Eroğlu ✗; 16. Yeter Karslı ✗; 17. Fadime Yıldız ✗; 18. Murat Görür ✗	1,326	0.07	▲0.07
LDP	None elected: 1. İbrahim Özdoğan ✗; 2. Rengin Akdağ ✗; 3. Evrenay Evrentan Satı ✗; 4. Raif Eyüboğlu ✗; 5. Abdurrahman Eser Esin ✗; 6. Erdoğan Yazgan ✗; 7. Refik Sarıkaya ✗; 8. Erdem Ceceli ✗; 9. Seyfettin Serdaroğlu ✗; 10. Ali İhsan Kulup ✗; 11. Recai Ünlü ✗; 12. Selma Kuzay ✗; 13. İbrahim Kocaman ✗; 14. Kadir Atalay ✗; 15. Ali Coşkun ✗; 16. Ekrem Özgü ✗; 17. Ümit Özbay ✗; 18. Bilal Gel ✗	1,238	0.07	▲0.03
HAK-PAR	None elected: 1. İhsan Çoban ✗; 2. Mustafa Taşçı ✗; 3. Mehmet Nuri Dervişbeyaz ✗; 4. Dilşah Aras ✗; 5. İsmet Kaya ✗; 6. Fazlı Taşkan ✗; 7. Sümrü Tüverekli ✗; 8. Ayşe Unudulur ✗; 9. Ayşe Temel ✗; 10. Firdes Yorulmaz ✗; 11. Semra Günaydın ✗; 12. İrfan Korucu ✗; 13. Osman Sezgin ✗; 14. Hüseyin Akyıldız ✗; 15. Hacı Kadir Koçak ✗; 16. Esma Polat ✗; 17. Tarık Genç ✗; 18. Irgat Polat ✗	1,110	0.06	▲0.06
Communist	None elected: 1. Özlem Şen Abay ✗; 2. Mehtap Arslan ✗; 3. Sevilay Cenik ✗; 4. Burçin Korkmaz ✗; 5. Güneş Şentürk ✗; 6. Özten Karataş ✗; 7. Dilşad Şimşek ✗; 8. Pınar Sert ✗; 9. Elif Aydemir ✗; 10. Sevgi Ferad ✗; 11. Işın Sakallı ✗; 12. Meral Arslan ✗; 13. Müge Elmas ✗; 14. Ersin Kaplan ✗; 15. Ebru Karakoç ✗; 16. Etkin Bilen Eratalay ✗; 17. Ekin Eylem Kaya ✗; 18. Emine Apaydın ✗	873	0.05	▲0.05
Centre	None elected: 1. Yaşar Yazıcıoğlu ✗; 2. Hüsnü Döğer ✗; 3. Abdullah Aydınlı ✗; 4. İsmail Cem Erel ✗; 5. Ziya Taşkın ✗; 6. Mehlika Başar ✗; 7. Evrensel Emre ✗; 8. Engin Eryılmaz ✗; 9. Fatma Ulusoy ✗; 10. Aslıhan Günel ✗; 11. İlknur Türkiş ✗; 12. Kenan Zeki Uçgunoğlu ✗; 13. Ömer Ünal ✗; 14. Eda Fatma Kahraman ✗; 15. Suna Turap ✗; 16. Cemal Kaplan ✗; 17. Bahriye Öztürk ✗; 18. Sabit Saruhan ✗	728	0.04	▲0.04
MP	None elected: 1. Abdulhaluk Mehmet Çay ✗; 2. Hacı Ali Özdemir ✗; 3. Ali Osman Türkmen ✗; 4. Bilal Şentürk ✗; 5. Süleyman Sarı ✗; 6. Salih Koç ✗; 7. Zafer İncekara ✗; 8. Fatma Özdemir ✗; 9. Ali Özdemir ✗; 10. Hasan Ural ✗; 11. Seyfettin Özyurt ✗; 12. Mahmut Yavuz Şengör ✗; 13. Mehmet Toptaş ✗; 14. Salih Ereğiz ✗; 15. Mustafa Bozoğlu ✗; 16. Ayten Türkmen ✗; 17. Sabire Tokyay ✗; 18. Feride Karasu ✗	584	0.03	▼0.11
YP	None elected: 1. Barış Bilgin Dilmen ✗; 2. Mahmut Nedim Ozaner ✗; 3. Hakan Önder ✗; 4. Rüştü Vardar ✗; 5. Halit Dervişoğlu ✗; 6. Kadriye Figen Dutlu ✗; 7. Tevfik Fikret Başçı ✗; 8. Serkan Çatma ✗; 9. Salih Tantan ✗; 10. Rifat Özgüner ✗; 11. Emine Akçuraya ✗; 12. Adem Zeren ✗; 13. Ümit Basri Nar ✗; 14. Selami Karakuş ✗; 15. Seyfet Ay ✗; 16. Mehmet Topçu ✗; 17. Ahmet Haklı ✗; 18. Halil Yağcı ✗	362	0.02	▲0.02
DYP	No candidates	52	0.00	▼0.10
HAP	No candidates	24	0.00	▲0.00
Total votes		1,839,080		
Rejected ballots		32,155	1.72	▲0.19
Turnout		1,871,235	88.13	▼0.39

==== 2nd electoral district ====
Vote share
AKP	47.49%
CHP	24.04%
MHP	17.52%
HDP	4.35%
Independent	2.97%
SP	2.03%
Others	1.60%

General Election June 2015: Ankara (II)
Party	Candidate	Votes	%	±%
AK Party	8 elected: 1. Emrullah İşler ✓; 2. Ahmet İyimaya ✓; 3. Lütfiye Selva Çam ✓; 4. Vedat Bilgin ✓; 5. Aydın Ünal ✓; 6. Ayhan Yılmaz ✓; 7. Mahmut Sami Mallı ✓; 8. Nevzat Ceylan ✓; 9. Ahmet Baba ✗; 10. Nuri Elibol ✗; 11. Adem Ceylan ✗; 12. Selim Cerrah ✗; 13. Bülent Yağmur ✗; 14. Neslihan Cenk ✗	683,592	47.49	▼6.52
CHP	4 elected: 1. Şenal Sarıhan ✓; 2. Murat Emir ✓; 3. Ahmet Haluk Koç ✓; 4. Nihat Yeşil ✓; 5. Ali Rıza Erbay ✗; 6. Celalettin Koç ✗; 7. Semra Dinçer ✗; 8. Barış Ozan Vural ✗; 9. Ali Yılmaz ✗; 10. Servet Ünsal ✗; 11. Selma Ergen ✗; 12. Haydar Doğan ✗; 13. Abidin Şahin ✗; 14. Ufuk Ataç ✗	346,068	24.04	▼2.67
MHP	2 elected: 1. Şefkat Çetin ✓; 2. Mustafa Mit ✓; 3. Hamit Ayanoğlu ✗; 4. Yaşar Yıldırım ✗; 5. Mehmet Damar ✗; 6. Gül Gülser Kılıçarslan ✗; 7. Mehmet Ali Tanrıverdi ✗; 8. Alparslan Sucu ✗; 9. Tayfun Ünal ✗; 10. Meltem Hatice Uluç ✗; 11. Hikmet Durğut ✗; 12. Tümer Zeytin ✗; 13. Fatih Gözüm ✗; 14. Bayramali Temizer ✗	252,172	17.52	▲3.09
HDP	None elected: 1. Mahmut Memduh Uyan ✗; 2. Gülsen Ülker ✗; 3. Aydın Çubukçu ✗; 4. Nursel Öztürk ✗; 5. Remziye Güçlü ✗; 6. Ayfer Balıkcı ✗; 7. İlknur Yılmaz ✗; 8. Kamber Ataş ✗; 9. Mehtap Özkan Deliduman ✗; 10. Orhan Çelebi ✗; 11. Münübe Koç ✗; 12. Gülüstan Aydoğdu ✗; 13. Şerif Oti ✗; 14. Dilek Ertürk ✗	62,621	4.35	▲4.35
Independent	None elected: Abdulkadir Yılmaz Faruk Nesimi Gözübüyük Gökmen Gürkan Mehmet Sedat Fırat Taner Pehlivan Yurt Atayün ✗	42,760	2.97	▲2.19
SAADET	None elected: 1. Mustafa Destici ✗; 2. Selahattin Şenliler ✗; 3. İlyas Tongüç ✗; 4. Hayrettin Çal ✗; 5. Mustafa Yılmaz ✗; 6. Ömer Eren ✗; 7. Fatih Beyazıt ✗; 8. Gökhan Tezcan ✗; 9. Murat Kılıç ✗; 10. Ayla Şan ✗; 11. Burhan Gümrükçü ✗; 12. Yılmaz Yarar ✗; 13. Yener Kılıç ✗; 14. Mahmut Demir ✗	29,234	2.03	▲0.06
Patriotic	None elected: 1. Şule Erol ✗; 2. Serhan Bolluk ✗; 3. Erten Acır ✗; 4. Sami Özdil ✗; 5. Dilek Paksoy ✗; 6. Zeynep Tulin Sağlamtunç ✗; 7. Şen Yazgan ✗; 8. Haluk Solak ✗; 9. Ercan Enç ✗; 10. Cezmi Naci Eren ✗; 11. Meliha Ünlü ✗; 12. Murat Ali Sakal ✗; 13. Müzeyyen Akçın ✗; 14. Mehmet Varol ✗	5,036	0.35	▲0.35
BTP	None elected: 1. Abdullah Terzi ✗; 2. Nuri Kaplan ✗; 3. Önder Çolak ✗; 4. Harun Göksel ✗; 5. Ahmet Burak Güven ✗; 6. Mine Sıdıka Kermalli ✗; 7. Ömer Ender Özçelik ✗; 8. Bayram Güzel ✗; 9. İlhan Gültekin ✗; 10. Aşur Özer ✗; 11. Sermin Sözünden Dönmez ✗; 12. Adem Özhan ✗; 13. Salih Türkay ✗; 14. Ünal Tunçay ✗	4,174	0.29	▲0.29
TURK Party	None elected: 1. Seda Kılıç ✗; 2. Gülseren Bozkurt ✗; 3. Sinan Ülger ✗; 4. Turan Kutlu ✗; 5. Berat Öztürk ✗; 6. Arzu Uras ✗; 7. Emine Karadoğan ✗; 8. İzzet Acıelma ✗; 9. Mine Candar ✗; 10. İbrahim Akhun ✗; 11. Hatice Demir ✗; 12. Halittin Çolak ✗; 13. Zeynep Pınar Başer ✗; 14. Musa Çildam ✗	2,796	0.19	▲0.19
DSP	None elected: 1. Müzeyyen Okur ✗; 2. Hikmet Aydemir ✗; 3. Mustafa Naci Sarıbaş ✗; 4. Günay Alçığır ✗; 5. Nursel Kızılırmak ✗; 6. Mustafa Ağar ✗; 7. Sezai Demirkaya ✗; 8. Ali İnce ✗; 9. Hacı Kemal Koçer ✗; 10. Gökhan Çoşkun ✗; 11. Emin Demir ✗; 12. Fatma Jülide Sevüktekin ✗; 13. Mehmet Önder ✗; 14. Dilek Yazıcılar ✗	2,417	0.17	▲0.02
YP	None elected: 1. Yusuf Yavuz Tavşan ✗; 2. Suat Güler ✗; 3. Fatma Nedret Sağlam ✗; 4. Sönmez Dervişoğlu ✗; 5. Ayhan Yürekli ✗; 6. Mehmet Akgün Bayram ✗; 7. Hikmet Akçuraya ✗; 8. Ertuğrul Karacan ✗; 9. Emine Nurdan Zeren ✗; 10. Muzaffer Taşkıran ✗; 11. İsmail Emre Özden ✗; 12. Mehmet Bayazit ✗; 13. Havva Aydın ✗; 14. Hamza Emiroğlu ✗	1,446	0.10	▲0.10
DP	None elected: 1. Nuri Efe ✗; 2. Selami Genel ✗; 3. Ali Kılıç ✗; 4. Nihat Yılmaz ✗; 5. Fikret Çatmakaş ✗; 6. Yaşar Karataş ✗; 7. Dilek Nezihe Ocak ✗; 8. Mehmet Cahit Karakuş ✗; 9. Sıtkı Taner Koç ✗; 10. Mustafa Kaptan ✗; 11. Borahan Günalp ✗; 12. Ali Ulu ✗; 13. Aynur Barut ✗; 14. Adem Bölükbaş ✗	1,209	0.08	▼0.40
HAK-PAR	None elected: 1. Derviş Korkmaz ✗; 2. İbrahim Polat ✗; 3. Refik Karakoç ✗; 4. Hamdiye Şeşeoğulları ✗; 5. Gülsün Korucu ✗; 6. Mahmut Temel ✗; 7. Celal Deniz ✗; 8. Recai Gören ✗; 9. Engin Binici ✗; 10. Doğan Kaygalak ✗; 11. Fatma Yener ✗; 12. İlyas Güler ✗; 13. Dilek Döner ✗; 14. İbrahim Şener ✗	1,127	0.08	▲0.08
HKP	None elected: 1. Sultan Kıran ✗; 2. Metin Bayyar ✗; 3. Neşe Semerci ✗; 4. Ali Cemal Kar ✗; 5. Bayram Karkın ✗; 6. Mehmet Cihan Çakır ✗; 7. Ahmet Erdem ✗; 8. Seyfettin Baş ✗; 9. Bilsel Caner ✗; 10. Saadet Gürtan ✗; 11. Sıddıke Karaman ✗; 12. Sadık Eroğlu ✗; 13. İhsan Bozgun ✗; 14. Sadık Caner ✗	1,077	0.07	▲0.07
LDP	None elected: 1. Hüseyin Tüzün ✗; 2. Sonay Kale ✗; 3. Akın Ceceli ✗; 4. İsmail Bilaloğlu ✗; 5. Mehmet Kutlu Önbilgin ✗; 6. Yaşar Kalender ✗; 7. Orhan Gürel ✗; 8. İsmail Serdar Pehlivan ✗; 9. Hamdi Erdem ✗; 10. Fatma Başgül ✗; 11. Cüneyt Karataş ✗; 12. Kadir Kurt ✗; 13. Melek İlham Beyaz ✗; 14. Timuçin Onur Alpöz ✗	825	0.06	▲0.04
DYP	None elected: 1. Murat Çiçek ✗; 2. Halil İbrahim Öğünç ✗; 3. Yavuz Gülecek ✗; 4. Mehmet Vecdi Tamerol ✗; 5. Nalan Yılmaz ✗; 6. Zahide Şimşek ✗; 7. Sibel Kara ✗; 8. Kahin Gökce ✗; 9. Cemile Kıdık ✗; 10. Kamil Tosun ✗; 11. Serdar Arslan ✗; 12. Zeki Kaçar ✗; 13. Ercan Altınsoy ✗; 14. Müzeyyen Çiçek ✗	790	0.05	▼0.06
AnaParti	None elected: 1. İbrahim Vefa Tarhan ✗; 2. Sami Ağca ✗; 3. Uğraş Gök ✗; 4. Serap İdil ✗; 5. Mehmet Subaşı ✗; 6. Gülören Cangal ✗; 7. Mustafa Gençoğlu ✗; 8. Onur Dedeoğlu ✗; 9. Sema Baltacı ✗; 10. Dursun Ercan ✗; 11. Serkan Sezgin ✗; 12. Gürsel Erdinç ✗; 13. Burak Navruz ✗; 14. Özel Sülük ✗	681	0.05	▲0.05
MP	None elected: 1. Aykut Edibali ✗; 2. İsa Erdem ✗; 3. Mehmet Can ✗; 4. Yusuf Zaim ✗; 5. Süleyman Şen ✗; 6. İsmail Yiğit ✗; 7. Zekai Soysal ✗; 8. Seyit Ahmet Ereğiz ✗; 9. Ramazan Güzel ✗; 10. Azmi Tat ✗; 11. Abdullah Bilim ✗; 12. Hasan Hüseyin Kanbur ✗; 13. Şerife Fatma Demir ✗; 14. Mümtaz Ak ✗	501	0.03	▼0.11
Centre	None elected: 1. Ayşe Şeyda Açıkkol Altunok ✗; 2. Mehmet Değerli ✗; 3. Yaşar Asiler ✗; 4. Harun Gökhan ✗; 5. Ökeş Ömer Turkan ✗; 6. Semih Kavuştu ✗; 7. Merve Saruhan ✗; 8. Mustafa Metindoğan ✗; 9. Ali Rıza Eminoğlu ✗; 10. Münir Onur Berçin ✗; 11. Nevzat Bişirici ✗; 12. Yaşar Er ✗; 13. Cercis Demir ✗; 14. Metin Yücedağ ✗	454	0.03	▲0.03
Communist	None elected: 1. Nahide Özkan ✗; 2. Billur Oğuz ✗; 3. Alev Emniyetli ✗; 4. Yeter Yılmaz ✗; 5. Ayşe Deriner ✗; 6. Hatice Karayel ✗; 7. Fatma Üçpınar ✗; 8. Cansu Özbay ✗; 9. Müge Azizoğlu ✗; 10. Rahşan Nazlı Somel ✗; 11. Özge Aydemir Güney ✗; 12. Şilan Deniz Sümer ✗; 13. Sevinç Serpil Tatlı ✗; 14. Necla Aslan ✗	398	0.03	▲0.03
HAP	No candidates	19	0.00	▲0.00
Total votes		1,439,397		
Rejected ballots		29,330	2.00	▲0.67
Turnout		1,468,727	88.17	▼1.21

=== Antalya ===
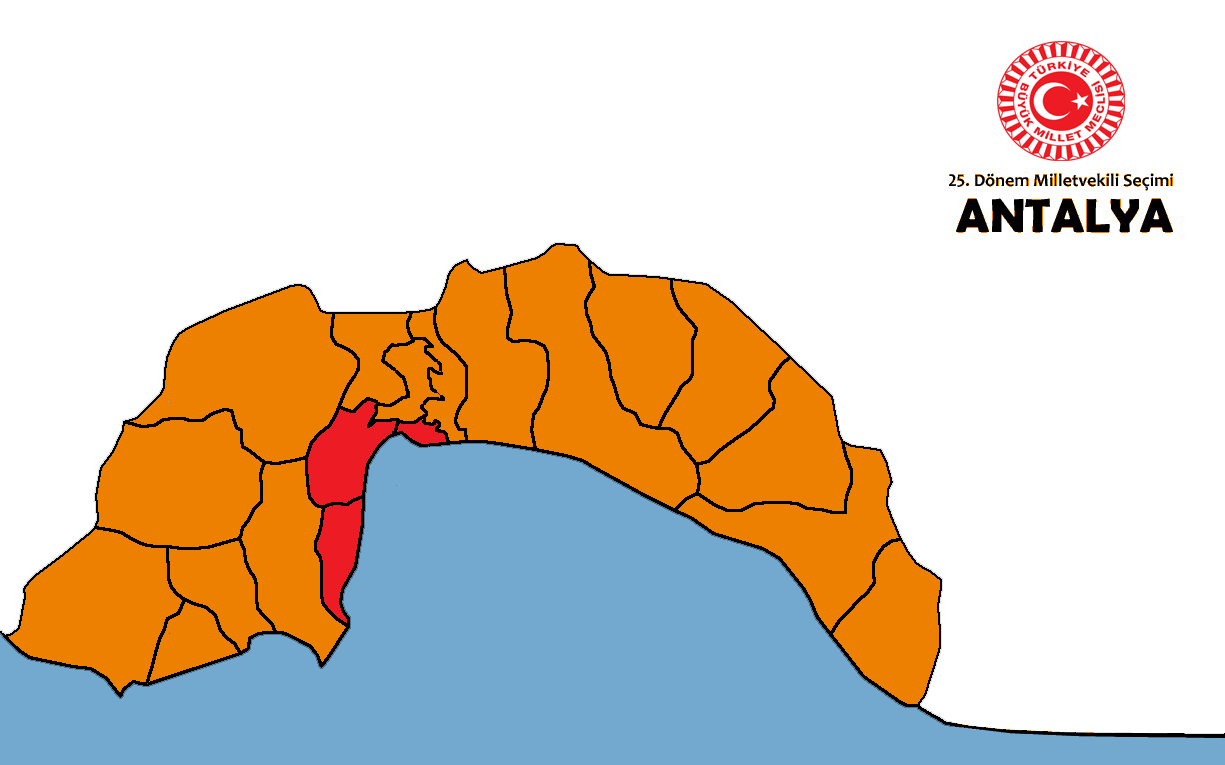
Winners according to districts

Vote share
AKP	35.28%
CHP	32.48%
MHP	21.69%
HDP	7.24%
SP	1.31%
Patriotic	0.48%
Others	1.52%

General Election June 2015: Antalya
Party	Candidate	Votes	%	±%
AK Party	5 elected: 1. Lütfi Elvan ✓; 2. Mustafa Köse ✓; 3. Hüseyin Samani ✓; 4. Gökcen Özdoğan Enç ✓; 5. Sena Nur Çelik ✓; 6. İbrahim Aydın ✗; 7. Atay Uslu ✗; 8. İbrahim Türkiş ✗; 9. Nevin Korkmaz Zor ✗; 10. Hakkı Beşkazalı ✗; 11. Ercan Mekteplioğlu ✗; 12. İzzet Yılmaz ✗; 13. Murtaza Tamyürek ✗; 14. Mustafa Akdeniz ✗	471,695	35.28	▼4.02
CHP	5 elected: 1. Niyazi Nefi Kara ✓; 2. Deniz Baykal ✓; 3. Çetin Osman Budak ✓; 4. Mustafa Akaydın ✓; 5. Devrim Kök ✓; 6. Figen Çalıkuşu ✗; 7. Rafet Albuga Zeybek ✗; 8. Nusret Bayar ✗; 9. Deniz Filiz ✗; 10. Sultan Yegen ✗; 11. Sevindik Gizli ✗; 12. Cavit Arı ✗; 13. Gürkut Acar ✗; 14. İbrahim Keser ✗	434,272	32.48	▼0.74
MHP	3 elected: 1. Mehmet Günal ✓; 2. Ahmet Selim Yurdakul ✓; 3. Tarkan Akıllı ✓; 4. Adem Uslu ✗; 5. Cafer Uyar ✗; 6. Cengizhan Gököz ✗; 7. Tolga Alıcı ✗; 8. Gökhan Kurşunlu ✗; 9. Metin Özkan ✗; 10. Mustafa Alperen Erol ✗; 11. Neşe Gül ✗; 12. Hasan Bölücek ✗; 13. Güray Parlak ✗; 14. Turgut Bucak ✗	289,954	21.69	▲0.82
HDP	1 elected: 1. Hakkı Saruhan Oluç ✓; 2. Deniz Yıldırım ✗; 3. Nuray Erçağan ✗; 4. Hadi Cin ✗; 5. Aysel İbili ✗; 6. İshak Kahraman ✗; 7. Gülkız Türk ✗; 8. Atalay Mete ✗; 9. İlkin Manya ✗; 10. Hasan Kıyafet ✗; 11. Leyla Ruken Yolcu ✗; 12. Savaş Sezgin ✗; 13. Songül Şarklı ✗; 14. Ebru Ergen Korkmaz ✗	96,765	7.24	▲7.24
SAADET	None elected: 1. Süleyman Burgan ✗; 2. Veysel Demir ✗; 3. Hüseyin Sarıca ✗; 4. Halil Güzel ✗; 5. Mehmet İslamoğlu ✗; 6. Yılmaz Derin ✗; 7. İlhami Demiral ✗; 8. Gülbeyaz Kurt ✗; 9. Fatime Üraz ✗; 10. Mahmut Bakır ✗; 11. Hüsnü Uysal ✗; 12. Ekrem Aslan ✗; 13. Aytur Çeteci ✗; 14. Mehmet Akburak ✗	17,557	1.31	▼0.03
Patriotic	None elected: 1. Zehra İnci Özdil ✗; 2. Şehriban Kasapoğlu ✗; 3. Mehmet Avni Özbek ✗; 4. Kadir Taş ✗; 5. Semih Önem ✗; 6. Rauf Ergün ✗; 7. Sevda Sabuncu ✗; 8. Nihal Küpeli ✗; 9. Cihan Avcı ✗; 10. Ahmet Sorkuç ✗; 11. Mustafa Bodur ✗; 12. Tahir Sertkaya ✗; 13. Eray Ethem Görgün ✗; 14. Erhan Topraktepe ✗	6,439	0.48	▲0.48
Independent	None elected: Hasan Subaşı ✗ Rauf Temel ✗	3,503	0.26	▼2.13
DP	None elected: 1. Ali Ateş ✗; 2. Ali Yener Erçin ✗; 3. Metin Özkan ✗; 4. Ömer Faruk Altuntaş ✗; 5. Gülen Sultan Yüksel ✗; 6. İskender Alper ✗; 7. Mehmet Yıldırımkanlı ✗; 8. Ahmet Nedim Turbil ✗; 9. Fuat Karapınar ✗; 10. Turgut Tuğrul Tuna ✗; 11. İsmail Hakkı Ertural ✗; 12. Gülsüm Özcan ✗; 13. Üzeyir Bekem ✗; 14. Nedret Eryol ✗	2,706	0.20	▼0.63
BTP	None elected: 1. Nazım Şahin ✗; 2. Bilal Erdil ✗; 3. Mehmet Sarıçobanoğlu ✗; 4. Durmuş Öztürk ✗; 5. Zeynep Doğan ✗; 6. Süleyman Çakacı ✗; 7. Didem Yabalak ✗; 8. Tuğba Altay ✗; 9. Abdullah Kara ✗; 10. İbrahim Gökyar ✗; 11. Veysel Türkyön ✗; 12. Osman Çakmak ✗; 13. Nalan Kurt ✗; 14. Mehmet Suiçer ✗	2,619	0.20	▲0.20
HAK-PAR	None elected: 1. Necati Bayram ✗; 2. Abdulaziz Akçan ✗; 3. Zehra Belkıs Korkmaz ✗; 4. Vedat Dede ✗; 5. Deniz Kahraman ✗; 6. Mehmet Eren ✗; 7. Güller Dindarik ✗; 8. Mine Kaygusuz ✗; 9. Erol Küçük ✗; 10. Düzgün Ali Korucu ✗; 11. Serkan Bemal Behçet ✗; 12. Mehmet Genç ✗; 13. Sadık Bıdık ✗; 14. Hasan Aslan ✗	2,380	0.18	▲0.18
DSP	None elected: 1. Metin Oktay ✗; 2. Ahmet Çakmak ✗; 3. Gültekin Zorlu ✗; 4. Demet Daşik ✗; 5. Emine Güzin Kıran ✗; 6. Zeynep Çakal ✗; 7. Kadir Yamaç ✗; 8. Sabiha Yılmaz ✗; 9. Tarık Doğan ✗; 10. Bünyamin Söylemez ✗; 11. Metin Özyurt ✗; 12. Ekrem Bozkurt ✗; 13. Ekrem Oğul ✗; 14. Erdoğan Er ✗	2,261	0.17	▼0.08
HKP	None elected: 1. Saliha Çatlı ✗; 2. Mustafa Hoda ✗; 3. Nevzat Erbaş ✗; 4. Durkadın Yılmaz ✗; 5. Muhitdin Türkan ✗; 6. Mustafa Yarayan ✗; 7. Hülya Bozgun ✗; 8. Şafak Türkan ✗; 9. Ayten Savcı ✗; 10. Ali Coşkun ✗; 11. Devrim Satı ✗; 12. Muharrem Toklu ✗; 13. Arzu Avcu ✗; 14. Haydar Karahan ✗	1,541	0.12	▲0.12
DYP	None elected: 1. Alaattin Yıldırım ✗; 2. Mehmet Avcı ✗; 3. Ali Boyacı ✗; 4. Mehmet Kocabaş ✗; 5. Alparslan Açık ✗; 6. Halil Durna ✗; 7. Cihan Hassanein M.Abbas ✗; 8. Suat Bakır ✗; 9. İrfan Çağlayan ✗; 10. Hasan Gazi Işık ✗; 11. İsmail Kayhan ✗; 12. Mehmet Hanifi Cengiz ✗; 13. İbrahim Kılıç ✗; 14. Ercan Cengiz ✗	1,352	0.10	▼0.19
LDP	None elected: 1. Hasan Ünlü ✗; 2. Yücel Karakılıç ✗; 3. Emine Cennet ✗; 4. Serkan Altınoklu ✗; 5. Coşkun Kuşcu ✗; 6. Şerif Tırpancı ✗; 7. Salih Cihangir Gürkan ✗; 8. Faik Mustafa Çelikdemir ✗; 9. Mustafa Can Duman ✗; 10. Mustafa Solak ✗; 11. Erman Ernez ✗; 12. Mustafa Arslan ✗; 13. Yücel Gürcan ✗; 14. Mete Şenol ✗	1,178	0.09	▲0.04
AnaParti	None elected: 1. Gülfem Tömen ✗; 2. Nurten Atalay ✗; 3. Elif Asdemir ✗; 4. Ali Mirasedoğlu ✗; 5. Ümüt Köprülü ✗; 6. Halil İncesoy ✗; 7. Mustafa Ertem ✗; 8. Semih Tömen ✗; 9. Mehmet Şevket Atalay ✗; 10. Süleyman Çeçen ✗; 11. Fatih Ekimler ✗; 12. Metin Erdem ✗; 13. Miray Ekmekçi ✗; 14. Hayri Esin ✗	947	0.07	▲0.07
Centre	None elected: 1. Köksal Selcik ✗; 2. Ali Reha Eken ✗; 3. Ömer Naci Şentürk ✗; 4. Emel Zeren ✗; 5. Arif Karakoç ✗; 6. Ramazan Dağtekin ✗; 7. Ahmet Güneş ✗; 8. Savaş Yılmaz ✗; 9. Hatice Demet Demir ✗; 10. Hakan Yılmaz ✗; 11. İsmail Selçik ✗; 12. Sevim Şenses ✗; 13. Hüseyin Ekinci ✗; 14. Saim Önçek ✗	663	0.05	▲0.05
MP	None elected: 1. Osman Soydal ✗; 2. Kamil Şentürk ✗; 3. Cevdet Dişçi ✗; 4. Nuran Özen ✗; 5. Osman Gökmen ✗; 6. Fatma Şan ✗; 7. Emre Karaardıç ✗; 8. Necati Şahin ✗; 9. Şahabettin Sağ ✗; 10. Adem Gençöz ✗; 11. Bedia İrban ✗; 12. Halil Nergizciler ✗; 13. Mustafa Koyuncu ✗; 14. Oğuzhan Öztürk ✗	589	0.04	▼0.21
Communist	None elected: 1. Sevinç Sertbarut ✗; 2. Dilek Gümüş Gökay ✗; 3. Natalia Koyuncu ✗; 4. Tülin Gök ✗; 5. Türkan Zeytun ✗; 6. Şengül Aktaş ✗; 7. Makbule Özel ✗; 8. Emel Altay ✗; 9. Elif Serin ✗; 10. Ayşe Kılınç ✗; 11. Özlem Özdemir ✗; 12. Hülya Savaş ✗; 13. Semiha Kahraman ✗; 14. Diren Alanbay ✗	471	0.04	▲0.04
TURK Party	No candidates	26	0.00	▲0.00
HAP	No candidates	17	0.00	▲0.00
YP	No candidates	5	0.00	▲0.00
Total votes		1,336,940		
Rejected ballots		26,941	1.98	▼0.18
Turnout		1,363,881	84.39	▼2.03

=== Ardahan ===
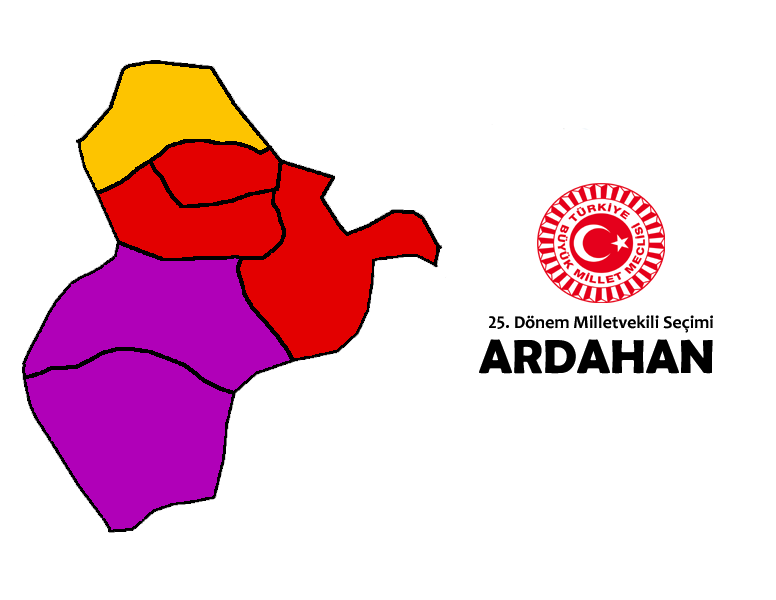
Winners according to districts

Vote share
HDP	30.15%
AKP	26.76%
CHP	22.09%
Independent	8.12%
MHP	7.83%
BTP	1.12%
Others	3.93%

General Election June 2015: Ardahan)
Party	Candidate	Votes	%	±%
HDP	1 elected: 1. Taşkın Aktaş ✓ ✗; 2. Arzu Moco ✗	17,360	30.15	▲30.15
AK Party	1 elected: 1. Orhan Atalay ✓ ✗; 2. Yunus Baydar ✗	15,407	26.76	▼13.46
CHP	None elected: 1. Ensar Öğüt ✗; 2. Sezgin Kaya ✗	12,718	22.09	▼8.69
Independent	None elected: Saffet Kaya ✗	4,680	8.12	▼4.37
MHP	None elected: 1. Bülent Ulutaş ✗; 2. Ömer Tekoğulları ✗	4,513	7.83	▼2.12
BTP	None elected: 1. Murat Kars ✗; 2. Niyazi Aydemir ✗	646	1.12	▲1.12
SAADET	None elected: 1. Hakan Çapan ✗; 2. Harun Gül ✗	581	1.00	▼2.39
DYP	None elected: 1. Bayram Kara ✗; 2. Mehmet Cemil Küçük ✗	329	0.57	▲0.34
TURK Party	None elected: 1. Mehmet Orakcıoğlu ✗; 2. Bilent Atalay ✗	261	0.45	▲0.45
DSP	None elected: 1. Ömer Türkoğlu ✗; 2. Bekir Dursun ✗	239	0.41	▼0.29
HKP	None elected: 1. Hasibe Otal ✗; 2. Kamil Dinç ✗	172	0.29	▲0.29
Patriotic	None elected: 1. Erdal Uygur ✗; 2. Ercan Kamiloğlu ✗	158	0.27	▲0.27
HAK-PAR	None elected: 1. Fevzi Günaydın ✗; 2. Aykut Engin ✗	149	0.25	▲0.25
DP	None elected: 1. Mete Gür ✗; 2. Serhat Atmaca ✗	79	0.13	▼0.64
HAP	None elected: 1. Ahmet Topal ✗; 2. Ali Çalışkan ✗	69	0.11	▲0.11
Centre	None elected: 1. Öztürk Yilmaz ✗; 2. Güven Bakır ✗	61	0.10	▲0.10
YP	None elected: 1. Emrah Akyüz ✗; 2. Erdal Yıldız ✗	40	0.06	▲0.06
AnaParti	None elected: 1. Eylem Görür ✗; 2. Mehmet Çakır ✗	36	0.06	▲0.06
LDP	None elected: 1. Emine Çetin ✗; 2. Abdullah Gökalp Tevrüz ✗	31	0.05	▼0.03
MP	None elected: 1. Ömer Lütfi Yaman ✗; 2. Mehmet Uçucu ✗	31	0.05	▼0.28
Communist	None elected: 1. Leyla Can ✗; 2. Dilek Çelik ✗	23	0.03	▲0.03
Total votes		57,583	100.00	
Rejected ballots		1,525	2.64	▼0.16
Turnout		57,809	83.88	▼0.34

== Overseas results ==
=== Albania ===
General Election, June 2015: Albania
Party	Total (Tirana)	
Party	Votes	%
MHP	146	27.55
HDP	130	24.53
CHP	112	21.13
AKP	80	15.09
SP	56	10.57
LDP	2	0.38
BTP	1	0.19
DSP	1	0.19
MEP	1	0.19
TURK-P	1	0.19
Others	0	0.00
Total	530	100.00
Valid votes	530	99.81
Invalid / blank votes	1	0.19
Votes cast / turnout	531	55.78
Abstentions	421	44.22
Registered voters	952	
Source: Seçsis

=== Algeria ===
General Election, June 2015: Algeria
Party	Total (Algiers)	
Party	Votes	%
AKP	101	34.24
CHP	79	26.78
HDP	71	24.07
MHP	34	11.53
Patriotic	4	1.36
SP	3	1.02
HKP	2	0.68
MEP	1	0.34
Others	0	0.00
Total	295	100.00
Valid votes	295	98.66
Invalid / blank votes	4	1.34
Votes cast / turnout	299	21.68
Abstentions	1,080	78.32
Registered voters	1,379	
Source: Seçsis

== See also ==
- Results breakdown of the Turkish general election, 2011
