= Abdurrahim Karslı =

Turkish politician

Professor Dr. Abdurrahim Karslı
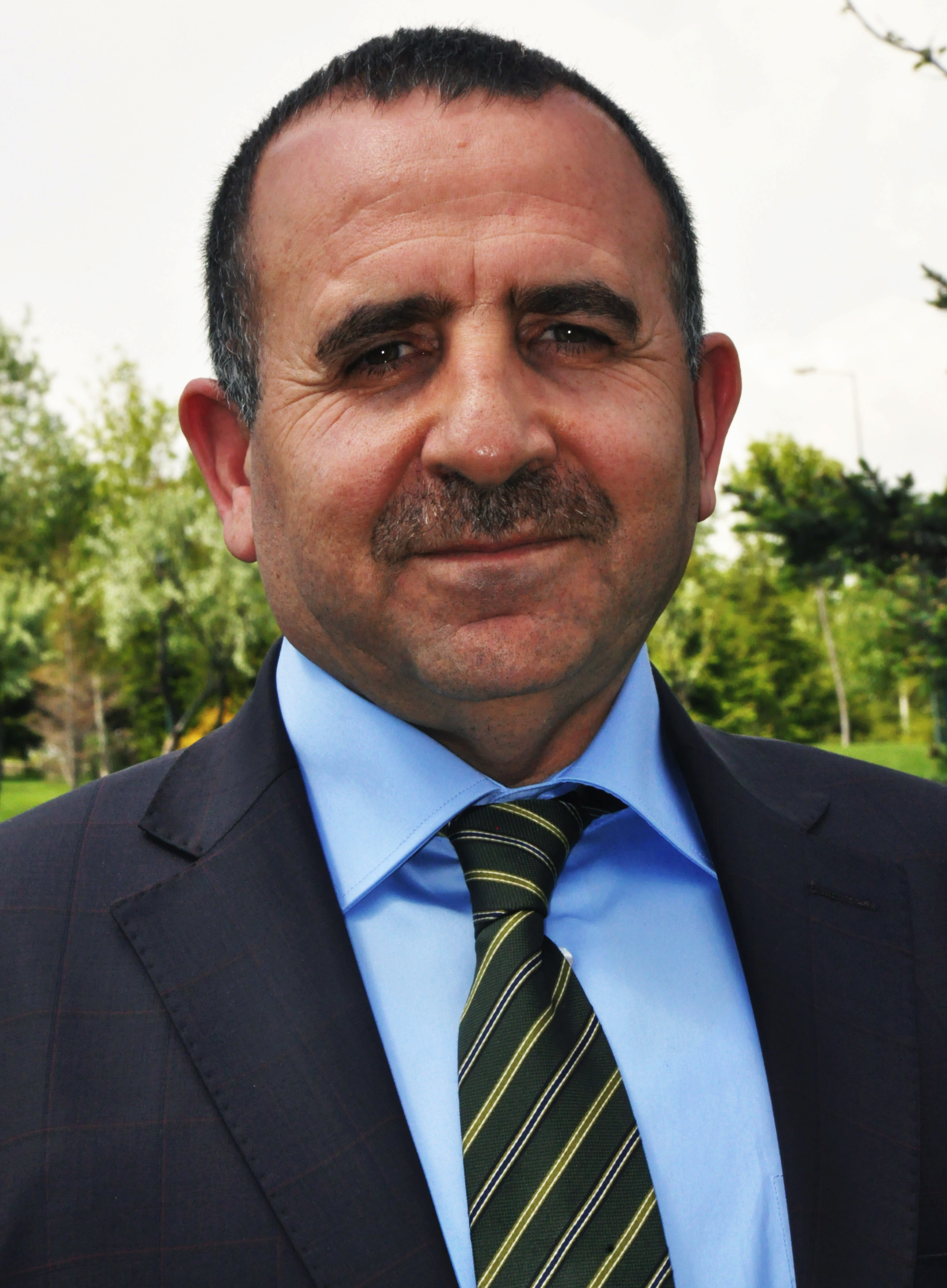

Leader of the Centre Party
- In office 7 July 2014 – 3 August 2024
- Preceded by: Position established
- Succeeded by: Pelin Gündeş Bakır

Personal details
- Born: 10 December 1964 (age 61) Horasan, Erzurum Province, Turkey
- Party: Centre Party
- Education: Istanbul University Faculty of Law

Prof. Dr. Abdurrahim Karslı (born 10 December 1964) is a Turkish academic and politician who serves as the 1st leader of the Centre Party of Turkey since 7 July 2014. As a prominent expert in bankruptcy and debt enforcement law, he rendered numerous high-profile case reports and expert opinions besides his academic scholarship. Since 1996, he has been the chair of bankruptcy law at Istanbul University's Faculty of Law and continues to teach at the same institution.

== Early life and career ==
Karslı was born in Horasan, Erzurum and completed primary education there before securing a place at Istanbul University's Faculty of law and moving to Istanbul. After graduating in 1984, he was appointed as a researcher in the field of bankruptcy law by the university and became a professor in 2010. He has been in charge of the Law Faculty's bankruptcy law branch since 1996.

=== 2001 financial crash and assassination attempt ===
Karslı helped prepare reports regarding the liquidation of bankrupt banks following the 2001 financial crisis. These included Yurtbank and Egebank. For this reason, he was targeted in an attempted shooting outside his office in Üsküdar, Istanbul in March 2003.

== Political career ==
Karslı founded the Centre Party (Merkez Parti - MEP) in the summer of 2014 and claimed that Members of Parliament from existing parties would defect to his new political movement due to dissatisfaction with the established opposition and government. This has as of yet failed to be the case, and the Centre Party does not have any form of political representation and does not score above 10% of the vote needed to win parliamentary seats in opinion polls.

=== Government corruption scandal ===
Following the 2013 corruption scandal, the ruling Justice and Development Party (AKP) embarked on large-scale controversial reforms to the Turkish judiciary, prompting Karslı to claim that the independent judiciary has come under attack. Pro-government journalists and politicians have thus claimed that Karslı is a supporter of exiled cleric Fethullah Gülen, who allegedly masterminded the corruption scandal in an attempt to remove the AKP from government. Karslı denies this claim, pointing to the wide range of politicians from different sides of the political spectrum who helped establish the party.

=== 2014 presidential election ===
When asked about which candidate the Centre Party would support, Karslı stated that he would support neither Recep Tayyip Erdoğan or Ekmeleddin İhsanoğlu, calling for his supporters to cast blank votes.
