= Hikmet Kıvılcımlı =

Turkish political activist and author (1902–1971)

- Born: 1902; Pristina, Kosovo vilayet, Ottoman Empire
- Died: October 11, 1971 (aged 69); Belgrade, Yugoslavia
- Occupations: Marxist–Leninist Politician, Revolutionary, writer, theorist, Translator
- Years active: 1919-1971

Hikmet Ali Kıvılcımlı (1902 – 1971) was a Turkish Marxist–Leninist–Socialist revolutionary, theoretician, writer, publicist, and translator. He was the founder of the Homeland Party (1954).

== Life and career ==
Kıvılcımlı was born in Kosovo in 1902, then the Ottoman Empire, his family were Turks with roots from Bolu, Kastamonu and Eskişehir. His family migrated to Istanbul in 1912 in the aftermath of the Balkan wars. On the founding of the Turkish Republic in 1923, Kıvılcımlı was a medical student at the military academy. It was during this period that he came into contact with communist politics and first became a member of the Turkish Communist Party (TKP). Prior to its closure in 1925, Kıvılcımlı was writing the special worker supplements for the TKP newspaper Aydınlık. He was also involved in labour organising during this period, and was appointed leader of the party's Youth branch in 1925. However, in 1925 the CHP government outlawed the Communist Party and Kıvılcımlı was arrested and imprisoned. Kıvılcımlı was again arrested in 1929 due to his political activity and ongoing links with the now illegal Turkish Communist party and imprisoned in Elaziğ, in Eastern Turkey for 4 years. Between 1925 and 1950 he was arrested frequently and served several jail terms.

Kıvılcımlı was one of the first translators of Marx’s Capital into Turkish, publishing sections prior to his arrest and subsequent 15-year prison sentence in 1938.

Kıvılcımlı was one of the few people of his era to be active and influential in several generations of Turkish Communism. He criticized the TKP because of its policy towards the administration of the Democrat Party (DP) in the 1950s. He was founder of the Homeland Party (Vatan Partisi) in 1954. The party was closed down in 1957, and Kıvılcımlı imprisoned with other party leaders. In 1960 he has already spent more than 20 years in prison. Later he was founder and director of the Tarihsel Maddecilik Yayınları publishing house in 1965, which published many of his works. He also was a co-founder of the İşsizlik ve Pahalılıkla Savaş Derneği (Turkish: Society for Struggle against Unemployment and Cost of Living, İPSD) on 19 May 1968. He wrote a great many articles in Aydinlik, Sosyalist, Türk Solu and Ant between 1965 and 1971, including a critque of the Yön publication of the 1960s. In 1970, Kıvılcımlı and his supporters were active in the Federation of Revolutionary Youth of Turkey (Turkish: Devrimci Gençlik, DEV-GENÇ), a Marxist–Leninist organisation founded in 1965. He died at 1971 in Belgrade and he is buried at the Topkapı cemetery in Istanbul.

The works of Kıvılcımlı continue to influence political parties in Turkey today, including the People's Liberation Party (Turkish: Halkın Kurtuluş Partisi - HKP), Social Freedom Party (Turkish: Toplumsal Özgürlük Partisi - TÖP) and Socialist Solidarity Platform (Turkish: Sosyalist Dayanışma Platformu - SODAP). Due to Kıvılcımlı’s training as a medical doctor, he was often referred to as ‘the Doctor’ and his followers 'Doctorists' (Turkish: 'Doktorcular’).

== Kıvılcımlı’s 'History Thesis' ==
Recent works have drawn attention to the Kıvılcımlı's unique approach to the theory of history - know in his writings as his 'History Thesis'. Kıvılcımlı's 'History Thesis' (Turkish: Tarih Tezi) was in part his attempt to deal with what he called the ‘originality of Turkey’ and focused mostly on an understanding of pre-capitalist societies - in particular the rise and fall of civilisations which he defined as ‘historical revolutions’.

Taking inspiration from Lewis Henry Morgan’s Ancient Society (1877), Friedrich Engels' The Origin of the Family, Private Property and the State (1884) and Ibn Khaldun’s Muqaddimah (1377), Kıvılcımlı developed this theory in his 1965 work History Revolution Socialism (Turkish: Tarih Devrim Sosyalizm). Rather than modern ‘social revolutions’ which were the result of intra-societal struggles, Kıvılcımlı saw these ‘historical revolutions’ as the product of inter-socialital struggles - in particular those between ‘barbarian nomads’ and civilisations. According to Kıvılcımlı, 'barbarian nomads' who lived an egalitarian lifestyle which he described as ‘primitive socialism’ fought against class-stratified civilisations which were unable to organise the necessary ‘collective action’ to resist them. The rise and fall of ancient civilizations was a result of this conflict.

== Interpretation of Islam ==
Based on his 'History Thesis', Kıvılcımlı argued that the rise Islam was a type of ‘historical revolution’, and that early Islam was revolutionary and early Muslims lived their life to in a ‘primitive socialist’ manner. However, like other ancient civilisations, power in early Islamic society was concentrated in the hands of Arab tribal elites after the Rashidun Caliphate period, moving Islamic society away from its revolutionary and communalist roots. Based on this analysis, Kıvılcımlı gave a speech in the Eyüp neighbourhood of Istanbul during the 1957 election campaign for the Vatan Partisi. This area is of great significance to Muslims in Turkey with many mosques and holy places. He attempted to articlate the politics of the party using the sayings of Muhammad and verses from the Quran. Due to this speech, he was charged with the crime of using religion as a political tool. He was the only communist to be charged with this crime in Turkey.

== Writing on the 'Kurdish Question' ==
After the Ararat rebellion of 1930, the Turkish Communist Party (TKP) took the position that the Kurdish movement of the day was reactionary, a product of backward feudal social relations, and in service to British and French imperialism. In contrast to this, in the 8th Volume of his Yol series written during his time in Elaziğ prison, Kıvılcımlı argued that the question around the rebellion was one of ‘a national question, a Kurdish national question’ and that the Kurds consisted a nation due to territorial, linguistic, and cultural unity. He strongly criticised both the assimilation and ‘Turkifiication’ policies of the Turkish Republic, as well as the TKP for its failure to analyse the Kurdish Question and as a national question as an indispensable part of the democratic revolution in Turkey. This analysis was forward thinking for its time, prefiguring the analyses of later Turkish Communists and the Kurdish Movement. Kıvılcımlı's ideas failed to convince others in the TKP, and the party reverted to the analysis it held in 1925, that the issues in the Kurdish regions of Turkey arose from the continuation of feudalism in those areas. Apart from small sections, the Yol series, including much of Kıvılcımlı's work on the Kurdish question was not published until after his death.

== Publications ==
Among his publications are Türkiye İşçi Sınıfının Sosyal Varlığı (The Social Existence of the Turkish Working Class), 1935; Tarih, Devrim, Sosyalizm (History, Revolution, Socialism), 1965; his masterpiece, and Yol: TKP'nin Eleştirel Tarihi (The Way: Critical History of the Communist Party of Turkey), consisting of a series of texts, written for the Central Committee of the TKP in 1932, published in 1979–1982. He contributed many articles in Aydınlık, Sosyalist, Türk Solu, and Ant between 1965 and 1971. After his death Fuat Fegan became custodian of Kıvılcımlı's papers and political inheritance.

Other works

- Allah – Prophet – Book
- Articles on Religion and Politics (Compilation)
- Bergsonism
- Classes and Politics in Turkey
- Commune Power
- Conquest and Civilization
- Development of Capitalism in Turkey
- Dialectical Materialism
- Effects of Religion on Turkish Society
- Finance-Capital and Turkey
- General Considerations
- Generally Social Classes and Parties
- Hegel and Philosophy Notes (Compilation)
- How is the Antichrist Knocking Our Door?
- Marxist Thought Shortly
- Matter of Ottoman History
- May 27 and Class Criticism of the Yön Movement
- Road Memories
- Metaphysical Sociologies
- No Anarchy! Great Reorganization!
- Onion Bread Congress
- Ottoman History as “Hüseyin Himmet Kırşehirli”
- Our Female Social Class
- Philosophy of Edebiyat-i Cedide
- Plans of the People's War
- Prison
- Push of Revolution Democratic Zortlama Teke Zortlatmasi
- Reproductive Ways of Turkish and Our Language Revolutionism
- Situation Argumentation
- Speech of Eyüp
- Speech of Sirkeci
- The Birth of Scientific Socialism
- The Development of Forms of Society
- The Final Transition from Primitive Socialism to Capitalism: Japan
- The First Transition from Primitive Socialism to Capitalism: England
- Three Seminars
- Village's Turkey and Socialism
- Vatan Party Statute and Program
- Wake to Warn – Warn to Wake
- What is Dialectical Materialism? How to use? What Is Not
- What is Opportunism?
- What is Production?
- What is Revolution?
- What is Revolutionary Intellectual
- Where Does the Word Paradise Come From?
- Who Blamed? - Letter to Brezhnev (Compilation)
- Who are the Marxism forgers?
