= People's Liberation Party (Turkey) =

People's Liberation Party Halkın Kurtuluş Partisi
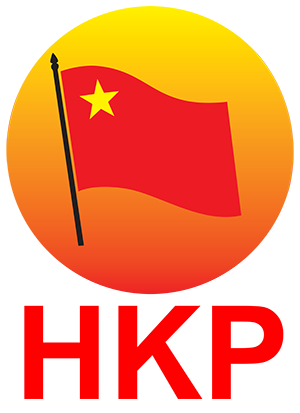
- Abbreviation: HKP
- Leader: Nurullah Ankut
- Founder: Nurullah Efe Ankut
- Founded: 15 June 2005
- Preceded by: Vatan Partisi
- Headquarters: Ankara
- Newspaper: Halkın Kurtuluş Yolu
- Youth wing: Liberation Party Youth
- Women's wing: Womens Of The Liberation Party
- Membership (2026): ▼1,002
- Ideology: Communism; Marxism–Leninism Socialist patriotism; Anti-imperialism; Hard Euroscepticism
- Political position: Far-left
- Colors: Red; Yellow; Orange (customary)
- Slogan: Halkız, Haklıyız, Yeneceğiz! (We are the people, We are right, We will prevail!)

Party flag

Website
- www.hkp.org.tr

The People's Liberation Party (Turkish: Halkın Kurtuluş Partisi, HKP) is a Marxist–Leninist communist party in Turkey. The HKP is based strongly around Hikmet Kıvılcımlı's ideas and philosophy.

The party was established on 15 June 2005, the 35th anniversary of the 15–16 June Worker Resistance.

HKP considers itself the political heir of both the Homeland Party, which was founded by Hikmet Kıvılcımlı in 1954, and the first Communist Party of Turkey, which was founded by Mustafa Suphi in 1920.

Nurullah Ankut, a retired philosophy teacher from Konya, has been the head of the party since 2005.

== Ideology ==
Hikmet Kıvılcımlı (1902–1971), who was a guerilla commander in the Turkish War of Independence when he was 17, devoted his life to the struggle of the working class. The HKP is led by his example and political thought and theory.

HKP states that it is against the local moneylords, the finance-capitalists who are the partners and defenders of the international moneylords in Turkey and that it will liquidate them.

== Election results ==
HKP gained the right to participate in elections in the Turkish local elections of 2014, and they received a total of 26,654 votes. HKP participated in the Turkish general elections of June 2015 with 550 candidate from 85 voting section. They received a total of 60,396 votes or 0.13%. In the November 2015 elections the party won 83,057 votes (0.17%).

=== General elections ===
Grand National Assembly of Turkey
Election	Party leader	Votes	Share	Seats
Jun. 2015	Nurullah Ankut	60,396	0.13%	0 / 550
Nov. 2015	Nurullah Ankut	83,057	0.17%	0 / 550
2023	Nurullah Ankut	31,831	0.06%	0 / 600

=== Local elections ===
Election	Party leader	Votes	Share	Number of municipalities
2014	Nurullah Ankut	26,654	0.08%	0
2024	Nurullah Ankut	8,654	0.02%	0

== See also ==
- List of political parties in Turkey
