= Centre Party (Turkey) =

Turkish political party

Centre Party Merkez Parti
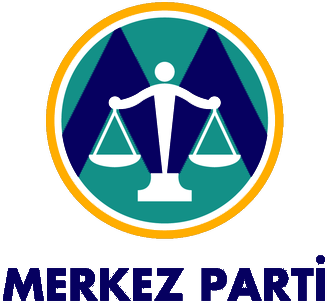
- Leader: Pelin Gündeş Bakır
- Founded: July 7, 2014
- Preceded by: People's Voice Movement
- Headquarters: Ankara
- Membership (2026): ▼2,672
- Ideology: Human rights Social justice Liberalism; Euroscepticism; Anti-establishment
- Political position: Centre to centre-right
- Colors: Turquoise, blue and orange
- Slogan: "Önce insan" ("People first")

Website
- www.merkezparti.org.tr

The Centre Party (Turkish: Merkez Parti) is a political party in Turkey formed on 7 July 2014 by Abdurrahim Karslı. The party was the result of the politicisation of the People's Voice Movement, with attempts to create a political party beginning in 2011. The party is claimed to be liberal, but has been accused of being affiliated with exiled cleric Fethullah Gülen. Despite Karslı's claims that up to 15 smaller political parties were thinking of merging with the party amongst talk of MP defections, it has no seats in the National Assembly, after it received 0.05% of the vote in the June 2015 election and did not contest the subsequent November 2015 election. It was previously represented by a single member in the parliament; Ercan Cengiz who resigned from the Republican People's Party (CHP) on 25 January 2015.

The party's membership is formed by politicians formerly of other parties such as the Motherland Party, the Nationalist Movement Party and the Democratic Left Party. Parties allegedly due to join the Centre Party are the Turkish Change Movement founded by CHP member Mustafa Sarıgül.

The party's economic policy is based on independence from the International Monetary Fund, the simplification of the tax system and the elimination of poverty. The party is strongly against Turkey's accession to the European Union, claiming that the EU has failed to assist Turkey in fighting the PKK separatist organisation. On the Cypriot issue, the party believes that the Republic of Cyprus and the Turkish Republic of Northern Cyprus can co-exist peacefully as two independent states.

== Party leaders ==
#	Leader (birth–death)	Portrait	Took office	Left office	Term of Office
1	Abdurrahim Karslı December 10, 1964 (age 61)	Abdurrahim Karslı	7 July 2014	3 August 2024	10 years, 27 days
2	Pelin Gündeş Bakır March 13, 1972 (age 54)		3 August 2024	Incumbent	2 years, 112 days
