= Rights and Justice Party =

Rights and Justice Party Hak ve Adalet Partisi
- Abbreviation: HAP
- Leader: Burhan Ataş
- Founder: Yiğit Zeki Öztürk
- Founded: 2012
- Headquarters: Ankara
- Membership (2026): ▼1,152
- Ideology: Kemalism; Turkish nationalism; Populism; Social justice
- Political position: Centre
- Colours: Red & brown

Website
- http://www.hakveadaletpartisi.org.tr/

The Rights and Justice Party (Turkish: Hak ve Adalet Partisi, abbreviated HAP) is a political party in Turkey led by Yiğit Zeki Öztürk since 2012. The party describes itself as a Turkish nationalist organisation that rejects the traditional left-right political scale. The party states that it is open to negotiations and alliances with any party.

In the presidential election of 2014, the HAP supported the opposition candidate Ekmeleddin İhsanoğlu.
