= Next Turkish parliamentary election =

- On or before 7 May 2028
- All 600 seats in the Grand National Assembly; 301 seats needed for a majority
Party	Leader	Current seats
AKP	Recep Tayyip Erdoğan	280
YENİ	Özgür Özel	91
DEM	Tülay Hatimoğulları; Tuncer Bakırhan	56
MHP	Devlet Bahçeli	46
CHP	Kemal Kılıçdaroğlu	44
İYİ	Müsavat Dervişoğlu	27
YY	İzzettin Küçük	20
YRP	Fatih Erbakan	4
HÜDA PAR	Zekeriya Yapıcıoğlu	4
DP	Gültekin Uysal	1
TİP	Erkan Baş	3
DBP	Çiğdem Kılıçgün Uçar; Keskin Bayındır	2
EMEP	Seyit Aslan	2
SAADET	Mahmut Arıkan	1
DSP	Önder Aksakal	1
Independents	N/A	10
Incumbent Speaker of the Assembly
Numan Kurtulmuş; AKP

Parliamentary elections will be held in Turkey no later than 7 May 2028, alongside presidential elections, to elect all 600 members of the Grand National Assembly. The incoming members will form the 29th Parliament of Turkey.

== Background ==
=== 2023 parliamentary election ===
The previous general election were held on 14 May 2023, and the second round of the presidential election was held on 28 May 2023. President Recep Tayyip Erdoğan, who has been in office since 2014, was re-elected president in the 2023 elections. The AKP, which received 35.62% of the votes in the general elections, came in first place, winning 268 of the 600 seats in parliament. The main opposition party, the CHP, entered parliament with 169 seats.

Additionally, 61 deputies from the Green Left Party, 50 from the MHP, 43 from the İYİ Party, 5 from the New Welfare Party, and 4 from the TİP received the necessary votes to enter parliament.

Due to the alliances formed after the elections, 4 deputies elected from the AK Party lists went to the Free Cause Party, 1 deputy to the Democratic Left Party, 15 deputies elected from the CHP went to the DEVA Party, 10 deputies each to the Future Party and SAADET, 3 deputies to the DP, 2 deputies elected from the Green Left Party went to the EMEP, 2 deputies to the HDP and 1 deputy to the TÖP, thus creating a parliamentary distribution in which 16 parties are represented.

Hatay MP Can Atalay, who was imprisoned due to the Gezi Park case, could not attend the oath-taking ceremony held on 2 June 2023. He was subsequently stripped of his parliamentary seat.

On 4 June 2023, Recep Tayyip Erdoğan announced the 2nd presidential cabinet of Turkey. The vice president and 15 of the 17 ministers in the previous cabinet have changed and new names have taken office.

== Electoral system ==
Number of MPs to be elected per electoral district

The 600 members of the Grand National Assembly of Turkey will be elected by party-list proportional representation in 87 electoral districts, by the D'Hondt method, with an electoral threshold of 7% (except for independent candidates). For the purpose of legislative elections, 77 of Turkey's 81 provinces serve as single districts. Due to their large populations, the provinces of Bursa and İzmir are divided into two districts, while the provinces of Ankara and Istanbul are each divided into three.

According to the Constitution of Turkey, any amendment to the election law can only apply a year after it comes into effect.

=== Electoral districts ===
Turkey is split into 87 electoral districts, which elect a certain number of members to the Grand National Assembly of Turkey. The Assembly has a total of 600 seats, with each electoral district allocated a certain number of MPs in proportion to their population. The Supreme Electoral Council of Turkey conducts population reviews of each district before the election and can increase or decrease a district's number of seats according to their electorate.

In all but four cases, electoral districts share the same name and borders as the 81 provinces, with the exceptions being Ankara, Bursa, İzmir and Istanbul. Provinces electing between 19 and 36 MPs are split into two electoral districts, while any province electing above 36 MPs is divided into three. As the country's most populous provinces, Bursa and İzmir are divided into two subdistricts while Ankara and Istanbul are divided into three. The distribution of elected MPs per electoral district is shown below.

District	MPs
Adana	15
Adıyaman	5
Afyonkarahisar	6
Ağrı	4
Aksaray	4
Amasya	3
Ankara	36
Ankara (I)	13
Ankara (II)	11
Ankara (III)	12
Antalya	17
Ardahan	2
Artvin	2
Aydın	8
Balıkesir	9
Bartın	2
Batman	5
Bayburt	1
Bilecik	2
Bingöl	3
Bitlis	3

District	MPs
Bolu	3
Burdur	3
Bursa	20
Bursa (I)	10
Bursa (II)	10
Çanakkale	4
Çankırı	2
Çorum	4
Denizli	7
Diyarbakır	12
Düzce	3
Edirne	4
Elazığ	5
Erzincan	2
Erzurum	6
Eskişehir	6
Gaziantep	14
Giresun	4
Gümüşhane	2
Hakkâri	3
Hatay	11

District	MPs
Iğdır	2
Isparta	4
Istanbul	98
Istanbul (I)	35
Istanbul (II)	27
Istanbul (III)	36
İzmir	28
İzmir (I)	14
İzmir (II)	14
Kahramanmaraş	8
Kars	3
Kastamonu	3
Karabük	3
Karaman	3
Kayseri	10
Kilis	2
Kırklareli	3
Kırıkkale	3
Kırşehir	2
Kocaeli	14
Konya	15

District	MPs
Kütahya	5
Malatya	6
Manisa	10
Mardin	6
Mersin	13
Muğla	7
Muş	3
Nevşehir	3
Niğde	3
Ordu	6
Osmaniye	4
Rize	3
Sakarya	8
Samsun	9
Siirt	3
Sinop	2
Sivas	5
Şanlıurfa	14
Şırnak	4
Tekirdağ	8
Tokat	5

District	MPs
Trabzon	6
Tunceli	1
Uşak	3
Van	8
Yalova	3
Yozgat	4
Zonguldak	5
Total	600

== Opinion polls ==
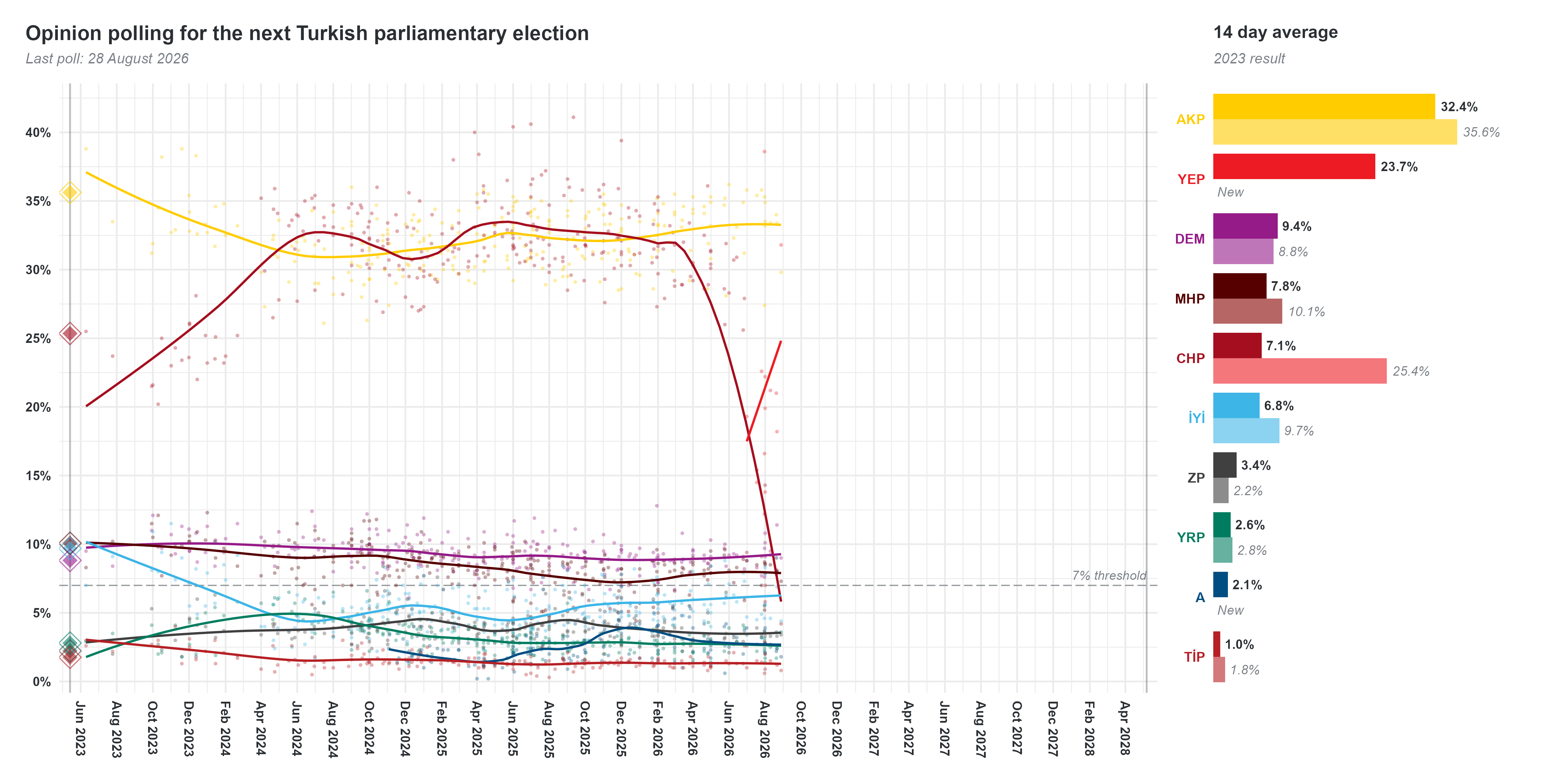
