= Bitlis (electoral district) =

Electoral district for the Grand National Assembly of Turkey

Coordinates: 37°50′N 34°45′E

- electoral district for the Grand National Assembly of Turkey
- Bitlis shown within Turkey
- Province: Bitlis
- Electorate: 176,597

Current electoral district
- Created: 1923
- Seats: 3 Historical: 4 (1999–2007)
- Turnout at last election: 84.86%
- Representation
- DEM: 2 / 3
- AK Party: 1 / 3

Bitlis is an electoral district of the Grand National Assembly of Turkey. It elects three members of parliament (deputies) to represent the province of the same name for a four-year term by the D'Hondt method, a party-list proportional representation system.

== Members ==
Population reviews of each electoral district are conducted before each general election, which can lead to certain districts being granted a smaller or greater number of parliamentary seats. Bitlis elected four MPs between 1999 and 2007. In 2011, the province lost one seat and elected three MPs.

MPs for Bitlis, 1999 onwards
Election	2002 (22nd Parliament)	2007 (23rd Parliament)	2011 (24th Parliament)	June 2015 (25th Parliament)	November 2015 (26th Parliament)
MP	Abdurrahim Aksoy; AK Party	Cemal Taşer; AK Party	Vedat Demiröz; AK Party		
MP	Vahit Kilner; AK Party			Mizgin Irgat; HDP	
MP	Zeki Ergezen; AK Party		Hüsamettin Zenderlioğlu; Independent	Mahmut Celadet Gaydalı; HDP	
MP	Edip Safder Gaydalı; Independent	Mehmet Nezir Karabaş; Independent	No seat		

== General elections ==
=== 2011 ===
2011 general election: Bitlis
Party	Candidate	Votes	%	±%
AK Party	2 elected ▼1: 1. Vedat Demiröz ✓; 2. Vahit Kiler ✓; 3. Mehmet Zeki Peker ✗	74,058	50.70	▼8.12
Independent	1 elected ▲1: Edip Safder Gaydalı ✓ Husamettin Zenderlioğlu ✗	58,748	40.22	▲18.44
MHP	None elected: 1. Davut Day ✗; 2. Coşkun Gündüz ✗; 3. Faik Er ✗	4,641	3.18	▼2.55
CHP	None elected: 1. Hasan Dalkıran ✗; 2. Erol Çiriş ✗; 3. Zübeyir Yaşar ✗	2,511	1.72	▼6.93
Büyük Birlik	None elected: 1. Cengiz Ekin ✗; 2. Zübeyir Uysal ✗; 3. Abdullah Çalık ✗	1,986	1.36	▲1.36
HAS Party	None elected: 1. Müfit Yüksel ✗; 2. Ekrem Tatlıcıoğlu ✗; 3. Metin Özlük ✗	1,108	0.76	▲0.76
DSP	None elected: 1. Bülent Yazıcı ✗; 2. Bedri Aydın ✗; 3. Rasim Cayhan ✗	929	0.64	N/A
SAADET	None elected: 1. Ziya Kalmaci ✗; 2. Cahit Uluğ ✗; 3. Bşlal Kaçar ✗	796	0.54	▼1.06
DP	None elected: 1. Hasan Taşkın ✗; 2. Halit Albay ✗; 3. Abdul Cemil Üner ✗	583	0.40	▼1.35
Communist_Party_of_Turkey_(today)	None elected: 1. Kader Sucuk ✗; 2. Hüseyin Ağçal ✗; 3. Gülseren Ercan ✗	416	0.28	▼0.02
DYP	None elected: 1. Arif Üçer ✗; 2. Şenol Çolak ✗; 3. Hüseyin Ayas ✗	124	0.08	▲0.08
Nationalist Conservative	None elected: 1. Bahar Bölükbaşı ✗; 2. Ahmet Tüylüoğlu ✗; 3. Serkan Özaltın ✗	106	0.07	▲0.07
MP	None elected: 1. İbrahim Karaca ✗; 2. Hatice Koçak ✗; 3. Saynur Vural ✗	72	0.05	▲0.05
Liberal Democrat	No candidates	0	0.00	▼0.07
Labour	No candidates	0	0.00	0.00
HEPAR	No candidates	0	0.00	0.00
Total votes		146,078	100.00	
Rejected ballots		4,077	2.72	▲1.05
Turnout		149,854	84.86	▼0.44
AK Party hold Majority		15,310	10.48	▼26.56

=== June 2015 ===
Abbr.	Party	Votes	%
HDP	Peoples' Democratic Party	93,263	60.4%
AKP	Justice and Development Party	47,788	30.9%
MHP	Nationalist Movement Party	6,049	3.9%
CHP	Republican People's Party	2,072	1.3%
HÜDA-PAR	Free Cause Party	1,709	1.1%
	Other	3,655	2.4%
Total		154,536	
Turnout		84.62	
source: YSK

=== November 2015 ===
Abbr.	Party	Votes	%
HDP	Peoples' Democratic Party	73,786	49.4%
AKP	Justice and Development Party	65,370	43.8%
CHP	Republican People's Party	4,112	2.8%
MHP	Nationalist Movement Party	2,902	1.9%
	Other	3,071	2.1%
Total		149,241	
Turnout		80.97	
source: YSK

=== 2018 ===
Abbr.	Party	Votes	%
AKP	Justice and Development Party	70,488	44.2%
HDP	Peoples' Democratic Party	69,110	43.3%
MHP	Nationalist Movement Party	6,242	3.9%
IYI	Good Party	5,142	3.2%
CHP	Republican People's Party	3,583	2.2%
HÜDA-PAR	Free Cause Party	1,809	1.1%
SP	Felicity Party	1,767	1.1%
	Other	1,377	0.9%
Total		159,518	
Turnout		83.41	
source: YSK

== Presidential elections ==
=== 2014 ===
2014 presidential election: Bitlis
Party	Candidate	Votes	%
AK Party	Recep Tayyip Erdoğan	72,139	52.06
HDP	Selahattin Demirtaş	60,583	43.72
Independent	Ekmeleddin İhsanoğlu	5,849	4.22
Total votes		138,571	100.00
Rejected ballots		2,538	1.80
Turnout		141,109	75.38
Recep Tayyip Erdoğan win			
