= Artvin (electoral district) =

Electoral district for the Grand National Assembly of Turkey

Coordinates: 37°50′N 34°45′E

- electoral district for the Grand National Assembly of Turkey
- Artvin shown within Turkey
- Province: Artvin
- Electorate: 123,790

Current electoral district
- Created: 1923
- Seats: 2
- Turnout at last election: 86.44%
- Representation
- AK Party: 1 / 2
- CHP: 1 / 2

Artvin is an electoral district of the Grand National Assembly of Turkey. It elects two members of parliament (deputies) to represent the province of the same name for a four-year term by the D'Hondt method, a party-list proportional representation system.

== Members ==
Population reviews of each electoral district are conducted before each general election, which can lead to certain districts being granted a smaller or greater number of parliamentary seats. As one of the smallest electoral districts, Artvin has consistently elected two MPs since 1999.

MPs for Artvin, 2002 onwards
Election	2002 (22nd Parliament)	2007 (23rd Parliament)	2011 (24th Parliament)	June 2015 (25th Parliament)	November 2015 (26th Parliament)
MP	Orhan Yıldız; AK Party	Ertekin Çolak; AK Party	İsrafil Kışla; AK Party		
MP	Yüksel Çorbacıoğlu; CHP	Metin Arifağaoğlu; CHP	Uğur Bayraktutan; CHP		

== General elections ==
=== 2011 ===
2011 general election: Artvin
Party	Candidate	Votes	%	±%
AK Party	1 elected 0: 1. İsrafil Kışla ✓; 2. Mehmet Kocatepe ✗	48,769	46.40	▲8.62
CHP	1 elected 0: 1. Uğur Bayraktutan ✓; 2. Yüksel Çorbacıoğlu ✗	37,180	35.37	▲6.94
MHP	None elected: 1. Yusuf Sağlam ✗ 2.Yusuf Turan ✗	13,970	13.29	▲2.32
DP	None elected: 1. Turhan Demir ✗; 2. Öner Gençtürk ✗	1,608	1.53	▼12.41
SAADET	None elected: 1. Gültekin Soydan ✗; 2. Fatma Şentürk ✗	1,238	1.18	▼0.72
HAS Party	None elected: 1. Akay Tekin ✗; 2. Haluk Fahri Zaim ✗	496	0.47	▲0.47
DYP	None elected: 1. Yusuf Öztürk ✗; 2. Selçuk Çulha ✗	386	0.37	▲0.37
Labour	None elected: 1. İskender Bayhan ✗; 2. Hasan Azaklı ✗	327	0.31	▲0.05
Büyük Birlik	None elected: 1. Hüseyin Bağdatlı ✗; 2. Öner Aydın ✗	251	0.24	▲0.24
DSP	None elected: 1. Enis Güneri ✗; 2. Mehmet Genç ✗	232	0.22	N/A
TKP	None elected: 1. Necla Çelik ✗; 2. Ekrem Taştan ✗	173	0.16	▼0.09
Independent	None elected: Birsen Kaya ✗	170	0.16	▲0.11
Nationalist Conservative	None elected: 1. Şenasi Yıldız ✗; 2. Hakan Önçirak ✗	118	0.11	▲0.11
MP	None elected: 1. Mehmet Bayrak ✗; 2. Leyla Topal ✗	108	0.10	▲0.10
Liberal Democrat	None elected: 1. Muhibbi Öztürk ✗; 2. Suat Şener ✗	88	0.08	▼0.18
HEPAR	No candidates	0	0.00	0.00
Total votes		105,114	100.00	
Rejected ballots		2,227	2.08	▲1.07
Turnout		107,341	86.44	▲2.17

=== June 2015 ===
Abbr.	Party	Votes	%
AKP	Justice and Development Party	41,982	38.8%
CHP	Republican People's Party	33,528	31%
MHP	Nationalist Movement Party	24,820	22.9%
HDP	Peoples' Democratic Party	2,943	2.7%
	Other	4,918	4.5%
Total		108,191	
Turnout		85.17%	
source: YSK

=== November 2015 ===
Abbr.	Party	Votes	%
AKP	Justice and Development Party	48,128	45.2%
CHP	Republican People's Party	37,670	35.4%
MHP	Nationalist Movement Party	14,372	13.5%
HDP	Peoples' Democratic Party	2,185	2.1%
	Other	4,150	3.9%
Total		106,505	
Turnout		83.85%	
source: YSK

=== 2018 ===
Abbr.	Party	Votes	%
AKP	Justice and Development Party	44,100	39.4%
CHP	Republican People's Party	36,105	32.2%
IYI	Good Party	11,600	10.4%
MHP	Nationalist Movement Party	11,269	10.1%
HDP	Peoples' Democratic Party	5,076	4.5%
	Other	3,841	3.4%
Total		111,991	
Turnout		87.65%	
source: YSK

== Presidential elections ==
=== 2014 ===
2014 presidential election: Artvin
Party	Candidate	Votes	%
AK Party	Recep Tayyip Erdoğan	50,068	52.62
Independent	Ekmeleddin İhsanoğlu	42,756	44.94
HDP	Selahattin Demirtaş	2,320	2.44
Total votes		95,144	100.00
Rejected ballots		2,361	2.42
Turnout		97,505	74.62
Recep Tayyip Erdoğan win			
