= Muğla (electoral district) =

Electoral district for the Grand National Assembly of Turkey

Coordinates: 37°10′N 28°30′E

- electoral district for the Grand National Assembly of Turkey
- Muğla shown within Turkey
- Province: Muğla
- Electorate: 604,443

Current electoral district
- Created: 1923
- Seats: 6 Historical: 5 (1987-1995) 4 (1977-1987) 5 (1961-1997) 7 (1957-1961) 6 (1954-1957)
- MPs: List: Tolga Çandar CHP Nurettin Demir CHP Ömer Süha Aldan CHP Ali Boğa AKP Yüksel Özden AKP Mehmet Erdoğan MHP
- Turnout at last election: 88.16%
- Representation
- CHP: 3 / 6
- AK Party: 2 / 6
- MHP: 1 / 6

Muğla is an electoral district of the Grand National Assembly of Turkey. It elects sıx members of parliament (deputies) to represent the province of the same name for a four-year term by the D'Hondt method, a party-list proportional representation system.

== Members ==
Population reviews of each electoral district are conducted before each general election, which can lead to certain districts being granted a smaller or greater number of parliamentary seats. Muğla has elected six MPs to parliament for almost twenty years.

MPs for Muğla, 1999 onwards
Seat	1999 (21st parliament)	2002 (22nd parliament)	2007 (23rd parliament)	2011 (24th parliament)	June 2015 (25th parliament)
MP	Fikret Uzunhasan; DSP	Ali Arslan; CHP		Tolga Çandar; CHP	Akın Üstündağ; CHP
MP	Nazif Topaloğlu; DSP	Ali Cumhur Yaka; CHP	Fevzi Topuz; CHP	Nurettin Demir; CHP	
MP	Tunay Dikmen; DSP	Gürol Ergin; CHP		Ömer Süha Aldan; CHP	
MP	Metin Ergun; MHP	Fahrettin Üstün; AK Party	Metin Ergun; MHP	Mehmet Erdoğan; MHP	
MP	İbrahim Yazıcı; DYP	Orhan Seyfi Terzibaşıoğlu; AK Party	Mehmet Nil Hıdır; AK Party	Ali Boğa; AK Party	Hasan Özyer; AK Party
MP	Hasan Özyer; Anavatan / AK Party	Hasan Özyer; AK Party / Anavatan	Yüksel Özden; AK Party		Hasan Kökten; AK Party

== General elections ==
=== 2011 ===
2011 Turkish general election: Muğla
List	Candidates	Votes	Of total (%)	± from prev.
CHP	Tolga Çandar, Nurettin Demir, Ömer Süha Aldan	237,488	45.58	
AK Party	Ali Boğa, Yüksel Özden	170,223	32.67	
MHP	Mehmet Erdoğan	84,462	16.21	
DP	None elected	8748	1.68	
Independents	None elected	5838	1.12	
DYP	None elected	2015	0.39	
HEPAR	None elected	1876	0.36	
SAADET	None elected	1770	0.34	
HAS Party	None elected	1745	0.33	N/A
Labour	None elected	1642	0.32	
DSP	None elected	1636	0.31	'"`UNIQ−−ref−0000000D−QINU`"'
Büyük Birlik	None elected	1482	0.28	
TKP	None elected	730	0.14	
Nationalist Conservative	None elected	610	0.12	
MP	None elected	528	0.10	
Liberal Democrat	None elected	293	0.06	
Turnout		521,086	88.16	

== Presidential elections ==
=== 2014 ===
Presidential Election 2014: Muğla
Party	Candidate	Votes	%
Independent	Ekmeleddin İhsanoğlu	324,827	63.61
AK Party	Recep Tayyip Erdoğan	164,759	32.26
HDP	Selahattin Demirtaş	21,101	4.13
Total votes		510,687	100.00
Rejected ballots		9,416	1.81
Turnout		520,103	78.29
Ekmeleddin İhsanoğlu win			
