= Çorum (electoral district) =

Electoral district for the Grand National Assembly of Turkey

Coordinates: 37°50′N 34°45′E

- electoral district for the Grand National Assembly of Turkey
- Çorum shown within Turkey
- Province: Çorum
- Electorate: 385,828

Current electoral district
- Created: 1923
- Seats: 4 Historical: 5 (1999–2007)
- Turnout at last election: 89.95%
- Representation
- AK Party: 3 / 4
- CHP: 1 / 4

Çorum is an electoral district of the Grand National Assembly of Turkey. It elects four members of parliament (deputies) to represent the province of the same name for a four-year term by the D'Hondt method, a party-list proportional representation system.

== Members ==
Population reviews of each electoral district are conducted before each general election, which can lead to certain districts being granted a smaller or greater number of parliamentary seats. Çorum elected five MPs from 1999 up until the 2011 general election, after which the number of seats was reduced to four.

MPs for Çorum, 2002 onwards
Election	2002 (22nd Parliament)	2007 (23rd Parliament)	2011 (24th Parliament)	June 2015 (25th Parliament)	November 2015 (26th Parliament)
MP	Ağah Kafkas; AK Party		Salim Uslu; AK Party		
MP	Ali Yüksel Kavuştu; AK Party	Cahit Bağcı; AK Party			Ahmet Sami Ceylan; AK Party
MP	Murat Yıldırım; AK Party			Lütfiye İlksen Ceritoğlu Kurt; AK Party	
MP	Muzzafer Külcü; AK Party	Ahmet Aydoğmuş; AK Party	Tufan Köse; CHP		
MP	Feridun Ayvazoğlu; CHP	Derviş Günday; CHP	No seat		

== General elections ==
=== 2011 ===
2011 general election: Çorum
Party	Candidate	Votes	%	±%
AK Party	3 elected ▼1: 1. Salim Uslu ✓; 2. Cahit Bağcı ✓; 3. Murat Yıldırım ✓; 4. Lütfiye İlksen Ceritoğlu Kurt ✗	209,764	61.23	▲3.83
CHP	1 elected 0: 1. Tufan Köse ✓; 2. Sait Börekci ✗; 3. Muharrem Bozdoğan ✗; 4. Cengiz Atlas ✗	82,264	24.01	▲1.77
MHP	None elected: 1. Mustafa Hidayet Vahapoğlu ✗; 2. Fuat İstanbullu ✗; 3. Aybüke Topçuoğlu ✗; 4. Hüseyin Esenyel ✗	37,120	10.83	▲0.07
SAADET	None elected: 1. Arif Ersoy ✗; 2. Adnan Cıdık ✗; 3. Ali Yazıcı ✗; 4. İsmail Sarıoğlu ✗	3,519	1.03	▼0.63
Büyük Birlik	None elected: 1. Mustafa Özarslan ✗; 2. Necmi Ketenci ✗; 3. Munise Bozok ✗; 4. Mustafa Koçak ✗	2,878	0.84	▲0.84
HAS Party	None elected: 1. Orhan Horan ✗; 2. Yalçın Akman ✗; 3. Gürcan Akca ✗; 4. Mehmet Sarıarslan ✗	2,420	0.71	▲0.71
DP	None elected: 1. Önder Çolak ✗; 2. Mustafa Pak ✗; 3. İbrahim Yıldırım ✗; 4. Cavit Pak ✗	1,880	0.55	▼3.28
Labour	None elected: 1. Hasibe Beyaz ✗; 2. Ali Ekber Üşüdür ✗; 3. Dilek Cengiz ✗; 4. Erdoğan Gültekin ✗	725	0.21	▼0.21
DYP	None elected: 1. Can Çetin ✗; 2. Koray Yıldırım ✗; 3. Metin Kocabay ✗; 4. İsmail Özen ✗	530	0.15	▲0.15
DSP	None elected: 1. Bilgin Sucu ✗; 2. Yusuf Damar ✗; 3. Ferai Bilginer ✗; 4. İsmail İspir ✗	438	0.13	N/A
Communist_Party_of_Turkey_(today)	None elected: 1. Yaşar Dertli ✗; 2. Kadir Durmuş ✗; 3. Uğur Hancı ✗; 4. Dilek Çelik ✗	319	0.09	▼0.07
Nationalist Conservative	None elected: 1. Mustafa Yurttaş ✗; 2. Neşet Yılmaz ✗; 3. Mesut Celep ✗; 4. Halit Yılmaz ✗	271	0.08	▲0.08
MP	None elected: 1. Mehmet Damar ✗; 2. Adnan Faruk Şahin ✗; 3. Ali Matışlı ✗; 4. Nurşan Pekşen ✗	239	0.07	▲0.07
Independent	None elected: Murat Burhanoğlu ✗	238	0.07	▼0.04
Liberal Democrat	No candidates	0	0.00	▼0.14
HEPAR	No candidates	0	0.00	0.00
Total votes		342,605	100.00	
Rejected ballots		5,591	1.61	▲0.93
Turnout		347,069	89.95	▲2.63

=== June 2015 ===
Abbr.	Party	Votes	%
AKP	Justice and Development Party	180,281	54.4%
CHP	Republican People's Party	74,268	22.4%
MHP	Nationalist Movement Party	59,108	17.8%
SP	Felicity Party	6,566	2%
HDP	Peoples' Democratic Party	6,139	1.9%
	Other	5,184	1.6%
Total		331,546	
Turnout		87.73	
source: YSK

=== November 2015 ===
Abbr.	Party	Votes	%
AKP	Justice and Development Party	207,137	61.3%
CHP	Republican People's Party	74,581	22.1%
MHP	Nationalist Movement Party	41,731	12.3%
HDP	Peoples' Democratic Party	5,088	1.5%
SP	Felicity Party	1,943	0.6%
	Other	7,452	2.2%
Total		337,932	
Turnout		89.04	
source: YSK

=== 2018 ===
Abbr.	Party	Votes	%
AKP	Justice and Development Party	178,083	51.1%
CHP	Republican People's Party	70,591	20.3%
MHP	Nationalist Movement Party	48,622	14%
IYI	Good Party	29,586	8.5%
HDP	Peoples' Democratic Party	11,230	3.2%
SP	Felicity Party	3,801	1.1%
	Other	6,275	1.8%
Total		348,188	
Turnout		91.14	
source: YSK

== Presidential elections ==
=== 2014 ===
2014 presidential election: Çorum
Party	Candidate	Votes	%
AK Party	Recep Tayyip Erdoğan	202,385	63.76
Independent	Ekmeleddin İhsanoğlu	110,175	34.71
HDP	Selahattin Demirtaş	4,839	1.52
Total votes		317,399	100.00
Rejected ballots		6,149	1.90
Turnout		323,548	83.49
Recep Tayyip Erdoğan win			
