= Elazığ (electoral district) =

Electoral district for the Grand National Assembly of Turkey

Coordinates: 37°50′N 34°45′E

- electoral district for the Grand National Assembly of Turkey
- Elazığ shown within Turkey
- Province: Elazığ
- Electorate: 378,305

Current electoral district
- Created: 1923
- Seats: 4 Historical: 3 (1999–2015)
- Turnout at last election: 85.50%
- Representation
- AK Party: 3 / 4
- MHP: 1 / 4

Elazığ is an electoral district of the Grand National Assembly of Turkey. It elects five members of parliament (deputies) to represent the province of the same name for a four-year term by the D'Hondt method, a party-list proportional representation system.

== Members ==
Population reviews of each electoral district are conducted before each general election, which can lead to certain districts being granted a smaller or greater number of parliamentary seats. Elazığ's seats have remained stable since 1999, continuously electing five MPs. Mehmet Kemal Ağar was one of the few MPs who was re-elected in the 2002 general election without changing parties.

MPs for Elazığ, 1999 onwards
Election	1999 (21st Parliament)	2002 (22nd Parliament)	2007 (23rd Parliament)	2011 (24th Parliament)	June 2015 (25th Parliament)
MP	Mehmet Kemal Ağar; Independent		Faruk Septioğlu; AK Party		Metin Bulut; AK Party
MP	Ali Riza Septioğlu; DYP	Mehmet Necati Çetinkaya; AK Party		Şuay Alpay; AK Party	
MP	Ahmet Cemil Tunç; Virtue	Zülfü Demirbağ; AK Party	Hamza Yanılmaz; AK Party	Sermin Balık; AK Party	No seat
MP	Latif Öztek; Virtue	Şemsettin Murat; AK Party	Feyzi İşbaşaran; AK Party	Zülfü Demirbağ; AK Party	Serpil Bulut; AK Party
MP	Mustafa Gül; MHP	Abdulbaki Türkoğlu; AK Party	Tahir Öztürk; AK Party	Enver Erdem; MHP	Yavuz Temizer; MHP

== General elections ==
=== 2011 ===
2011 general election: Elazığ
Party	Candidate	Votes	%	±%
AK Party	4 elected ▼1: 1. Zülfü Demirbağ ✓; 2. Şuay Alpay ✓; 3. Faruk Septioğlu ✓; 4. Sermin Balık ✓; 5. Metin Bulut ✗	213,506	67.41	▲10.20
MHP	1 elected ▲1: 1. Enver Erdem ✓; 2. Yavuz Temizer ✗; 3. Abdurrahman Kızgın ✗; 4. Mehmet Akif Aladağ ✗; 5. Sabahattin Aydın ✗	45,789	14.46	▲8.00
CHP	None elected: 1. Ali Özcan ✗; 2. Mustafa Kemal Atikeler ✗; 3. Mehmet Çalışkan ✗; 4. Hülya Ülkü ✗; 5. Mustafa Ünsal Karatepe ✗	41,742	13.18	▲6.11
SAADET	None elected: 1. Latif Öztek ✗; 2. İbrahim Öcal ✗; 3. İbrahim Hacıbekiroğlu ✗; 4. Fikret Uymaz ✗; 5. Mine Kaya ✗	7,169	2.26	▼1.45
HAS Party	None elected: 1. Kadir Çiçek ✗; 2. Uğurhan Ergün ✗; 3. Mehmet Sıdık Aran ✗; 4. Erhan Emre ✗; 5. Abdulkerim Avanoz ✗	3,472	1.10	▲1.10
Büyük Birlik	None elected: 1. Mustafa Selami Ekici ✗; 2. Mehmet Hanifi Batı ✗; 3. Erdal Gökmen ✗; 4. Leyla Kömürcü ✗; 5. Fethi Saydam ✗	2,117	0.67	▲0.67
DP	None elected: 1. Bayram Kavak ✗; 2. Adnan Oğuz ✗; 3. Ahmet Feti Çolakoğlu ✗; 4. Abdurrahman Albayrak ✗; 5. Murat Yeşilgül ✗	1,162	0.37	▼20.32
HEPAR	None elected: 1. Faruk Demir ✗; 2. Aysel Kafkas ✗; 3. Yusuf Teymur ✗; 4. Murat Demir ✗; 5. Muhammed Gür ✗	415	0.13	▲0.13
DYP	None elected: 1. Halil İbrahim Öğünç ✗; 2. Savaş Yavuztürk ✗; 3. Yusuf Biçer ✗; 4. Ayla Serpil Bozkurt ✗; 5. Alpaslan Aldırmaz ✗	376	0.12	▲0.12
MP	None elected: 1. Havva Kılınç ✗; 2. Ömer İrfan Çetiner ✗; 3. Hamza Topuz ✗; 4. Baki Karasu ✗; 5. Fatmaana Yakın ✗	301	0.10	▲0.10
DSP	None elected: 1. Mustafa Yılmaz ✗; 2. Talip Uz ✗; 3. Nurgül Öner ✗; 4. Umur Buluç ✗; 5. Cengiz Erkişi ✗	240	0.08	N/A
Communist_Party_of_Turkey_(today)	None elected: 1. Düzgün Narin ✗; 2. Nuray Duman ✗; 3. Güneş Gültürk Çapar ✗; 4. Güvenç Kutlu Kılıç ✗; 5. Zeynel Erenler ✗	224	0.07	▼0.22
Nationalist Conservative	None elected: 1. Hacı Mehmet Karabaş ✗; 2. Yüksel Yılmaz ✗; 3. Turgut Balsüzen ✗; 4. Tuncay Alamur ✗; 5. Ferdi Köksal ✗	220	0.07	▲0.07
Liberal Democrat	No candidates	0	0.00	▼0.10
Labour	No candidates	0	0.00	0.00
Total votes		316,733	100.00	
Rejected ballots		7,738	2.39	▲1.47
Turnout		323,432	85.50	▲8.95
AK Party hold Majority		167,717	51.86	▲15.68

=== June 2015 ===
Abbr.	Party	Votes	%
AK Party	Justice and Development Party	169,043	52.9%
MHP	Nationalist Movement Party	66,600	20.9%
HDP	Peoples' Democratic Party	48,704	15.2%
CHP	Republican People's Party	21,259	6.7%
	Other	13,809	4.3%
Total		319,415	
Turnout		83.03	
source: YSK

=== November 2015 ===
Abbr.	Party	Votes	%
AK Party	Justice and Development Party	219,485	66.8%
MHP	Nationalist Movement Party	44,198	13.5%
HDP	Peoples' Democratic Party	36,043	11%
CHP	Republican People's Party	19,768	6%
	Other	9,009	2.7%
Total		328,503	
Turnout		84.17	
source: YSK

=== 2018 ===
Abbr.	Party	Votes	%
AK Party	Justice and Development Party	183,604	53.9%
MHP	Nationalist Movement Party	46,028	13.5%
CHP	Republican People's Party	35,651	10.5%
HDP	Peoples' Democratic Party	33,633	9.9%
IYI	Good Party	26,396	7.7%
	Other	15,514	4.6%
Total		340,826	
Turnout		84.99	
source: YSK

== Presidential elections ==
=== 2014 ===
2014 presidential election: Elazığ
Party	Candidate	Votes	%
AK Party	Recep Tayyip Erdoğan	201,342	70.56
Independent	Ekmeleddin İhsanoğlu	52,943	18.55
HDP	Selahattin Demirtaş	31,057	10.88
Total votes		285,342	100.00
Rejected ballots		7,537	2.57
Turnout		292,879	74.29
Recep Tayyip Erdoğan win			
