= Gümüşhane (electoral district) =

Electoral district for the Grand National Assembly of Turkey

Coordinates: 37°50′N 34°45′E

- electoral district for the Grand National Assembly of Turkey
- Gümüşhane shown within Turkey
- Province: Gümüşhane
- Electorate: 88,874

Current electoral district
- Created: 1923
- Seats: 2
- MPs: List: Kemalettin Aydın AKP Feramuz Üstün AKP
- Turnout at last election: 79.71%
- Representation
- AK Party: 1 / 2
- MHP: 1 / 2

Gümüşhane is an electoral district of the Grand National Assembly of Turkey. It elects two members of parliament (deputies) to represent the province of the same name for a four-year term by the D'Hondt method, a party-list proportional representation system.

== Members ==
Population reviews of each electoral district are conducted before each general election, which can lead to certain districts being granted a smaller or greater number of parliamentary seats. With one of the smallest electorates of any province, Gümüşhane has consistently returned two MPs since the 1999 general election.

MPs for Gümüşhane, 1999 onwards
| Election | 1999 (21st Parliament) | 2002 (22nd Parliament) | 2007 (23rd Parliament) | 2011 (24th Parliament) | June 2015 (25th Parliament) |
| MP | Lütfi Doğan; Virtue | Sabri Varan; AK Party | Kemalettin Aydın; AK Party | | |
| MP | Bedri Yaşar; MHP | Temel Yılmaz; AK Party | Yahya Doğan; AK Party | Feramuz Üstün; AK Party | Mustafa Canlı; MHP |

== General elections ==
=== 2011 ===
2011 general election: Gümüşhane
| Party | Candidate | Votes | % | ±% |
|---|---|---|---|---|
| AK Party | 2 elected 0: 1. Kemalettin Aydın ✓; 2. Feramuz Üstün ✓ | 45,203 | 65.02 | ▲4.38 |
| MHP | None elected: 1. Bedri Yaşar ✗; 2. Çetin Işık ✗ | 15,004 | 21.58 | ▲2.32 |
| CHP | None elected: 1. Mutlu Gürler ✗; 2. Ercan Özdemir ✗ | 5,401 | 7.77 | ▼0.17 |
| SAADET | None elected: 1. Akın Demir ✗; 2. Yalçın Sevinç ✗ | 1,703 | 2.45 | ▼1.86 |
| HAS Party | None elected: 1. Mustafa Atay ✗; 2. İlhami Karagül ✗ | 647 | 0.93 | ▲0.93 |
| Büyük Birlik | None elected: 1. Hamdi Daltaban ✗; 2. Tayyar Parlak ✗ | 507 | 0.73 | ▲0.73 |
| DP | None elected: 1. Coşkun Gündüz ✗; 2. Hulusi Aydın ✗ | 444 | 0.64 | ▼3.36 |
| DYP | None elected: 1. Nazlı Erol ✗; 2. Enes Nalbant ✗ | 189 | 0.27 | ▲0.27 |
| Nationalist Conservative | None elected: 1. Uğur Tanrıverdi ✗; 2. İbrahim Solmaz ✗ | 99 | 0.14 | ▲0.14 |
| Labour | None elected: 1. Hasan Hacaloğlu ✗; 2. Sadık Görpeoğlu ✗ | 86 | 0.12 | ▼0.12 |
| Communist_Party_of_Turkey_(today) | None elected: 1. Ulaş Kara ✗; 2. Bahadır Yavuz ✗ | 81 | 0.12 | ▼0.03 |
| DSP | None elected: 1. Güngör Çelik ✗; 2. Ali Akyüz ✗ | 55 | 0.08 | N/A |
| MP | None elected: 1. Şerife Fatma Demir ✗; 2. Abdullah Sarı ✗ | 51 | 0.07 | ▲0.07 |
| Independent | None elected: Vecdet Ertek Gürpınar ✗ | 30 | 0.04 | ▼0.14 |
| Liberal Democrat | None elected: 1. Gediz Tetik ✗; 2. Zefure Kömleksiz ✗ | 24 | 0.03 | ▼0.09 |
| HEPAR | No candidates | 0 | 0.00 | 0.00 |
| Total votes | | 69,524 | 100.00 | |
| Rejected ballots | | 1,535 | 1.82 | ▲0.73 |
| Turnout | | 70,838 | 79.71 | ▼2.32 |

=== June 2015 ===
| Abbr. | Party | Votes | % |
|---|---|---|---|
| AK Party | Justice and Development Party | 41,682 | 56.9% |
| MHP | Nationalist Movement Party | 23,025 | 31.4% |
| CHP | Republican People's Party | 3,727 | 5.1% |
| SP | Felicity Party | 2,156 | 2.9% |
| | Other | 2,651 | 3.6% |
| Total | | 73,241 | |
| Turnout | | 76.71 | |
source: YSK

=== November 2015 ===
| Abbr. | Party | Votes | % |
|---|---|---|---|
| AK Party | Justice and Development Party | 50,445 | 68.3% |
| MHP | Nationalist Movement Party | 17,052 | 23.1% |
| CHP | Republican People's Party | 3,527 | 4.8% |
| SP | Felicity Party | 790 | 1.1% |
| | Other | 2,007 | 2.7% |
| Total | | 73,821 | |
| Turnout | | 80.69 | |
source: YSK

=== November 2015 ===
| Abbr. | Party | Votes | % |
|---|---|---|---|
| AK Party | Justice and Development Party | 44,124 | 56% |
| MHP | Nationalist Movement Party | 16,199 | 20.5% |
| IYI | Good Party | 9,048 | 11.5% |
| CHP | Republican People's Party | 5,580 | 7.1% |
| SP | Felicity Party | 1,575 | 2% |
| | Other | 2,332 | 3% |
| Total | | 78,858 | |
| Turnout | | 80.19 | |
source: YSK

== Presidential elections ==
=== 2014 ===
2014 presidential election: Gümüşhane
| Party | Candidate | Votes | % |
|---|---|---|---|
| AK Party | Recep Tayyip Erdoğan | 52,535 | 75.06 |
| Independent | Ekmeleddin İhsanoğlu | 16,663 | 23.81 |
| HDP | Selahattin Demirtaş | 796 | 1.14 |
| Total votes | | 69,994 | 100.00 |
| Rejected ballots | | 1,617 | 2.26 |
| Turnout | | 71,611 | 72.16 |
| Recep Tayyip Erdoğan win | | | |
