= Niğde (electoral district) =

Electoral district of the Grand National Assembly of Turkey

Coordinates: 37°50′N 34°45′E

- electoral district for the Grand National Assembly of Turkey
- Niğde shown within Turkey
- Province: Niğde
- Electorate: 219,901

Current electoral district
- Created: 1920
- Seats: 3 Historical: 4 (1995-1999) 6 (1987-1995) 5 (1961-1987) 7 (1957-1961) 8 (1954-1957)
- MPs: List: Cevahir Uzkurt AKP Ömer Fethi Gürer CHP Cumali İnce MHP
- Turnout at last election: 85.89%
- Representation
- AK Party: 1 / 3
- CHP: 1 / 3
- MHP: 1 / 3

Niğde is an electoral district of the Grand National Assembly of Turkey. It elects three members of parliament (deputies) to represent the province of the same name for a four-year term by the D'Hondt method, a party-list proportional representation system.

== Members ==
Population reviews of each electoral district are conducted before each general election, which can lead to certain districts being granted a smaller or greater number of parliamentary seats.

Niğde is a shrinking electoral district, having for many years been represented by five members. Since the 1999 general election it has had three members of parliament in Ankara.

MPs for Niğde, 1999 onwards
Seat	1999 (21st parliament)	2002 (22nd parliament)	2007 (23rd parliament)	2011 (24th parliament)	June 2015 (25th parliament)
MP	Doğan Baran; Anavatan	Mahmet Uğur Çetin; AK Party	İsmail Göksel; AK Party	Alparslan Kavaklıoğlu; AK Party	
MP	Mükerrem Levent; MHP	Erdoğan Özegen; AK Party	Muharrem Selamoğlu; AK Party	Ömer Selvi; AK Party	Erdoğan Özegen; AK Party
MP	Eyüp Doğanlar; DSP	Orhan Eraslan; CHP	Mümin İnan; MHP	Doğan Şafak; CHP	Vedat Bayram; MHP

== General elections ==
=== 2011 ===
2011 Turkish general election: Niğde
List	Candidates	Votes	Of total (%)	± from prev.
AK Party	Alparslan Kavaklıoğlu, Ömer Selvi	100,380	54.25	
CHP	Doğan Şafak	39774	21.50	
MHP	None elected	35,369	19.11	
HAS Party	None elected	2747	1.48	N/A
SAADET	None elected	2145	1.16	
Independents	None elected	1648	0.89	
DP	None elected	1202	0.65	
Büyük Birlik	None elected	444	0.24	
DSP	None elected	367	0.2	'"`UNIQ−−ref−0000000D−QINU`"'
Labour	None elected	255	0.14	
HEPAR	None elected	174	0.09	
DYP	None elected	164	0.09	
Nationalist Conservative	None elected	139	0.08	
TKP	None elected	137	0.07	
MP	None elected	90	0.05	
Liberal Democrat	None elected	0		
Turnout		185,035	85.89	

== Presidential elections ==
=== 2014 ===
Presidential Election 2014: Niğde
Party	Candidate	Votes	%
AK Party	Recep Tayyip Erdoğan	102,576	58.92
Independent	Ekmeleddin İhsanoğlu	69,119	39.70
HDP	Selahattin Demirtaş	2,403	1.38
Total votes		174,098	100.00
Rejected ballots		4,257	2.39
Turnout		178,355	77.63
Recep Tayyip Erdoğan win			
