= Kilis (electoral district) =

Electoral district for the Grand National Assembly of Turkey

Coordinates: 36°50′N 37°05′E

- electoral district for the Grand National Assembly of Turkey
- Kilis shown within Turkey
- Province: Kilis
- Electorate: 75,872

Current electoral district
- Created: 1995
- Seats: 2
- Turnout at last election: 87.62%
- Representation
- AK Party: 1 / 2
- MHP: 1 / 2

Kilis is an electoral district of the Grand National Assembly of Turkey. It elects two members of parliament (deputies) to represent the province of the same name for a four-year term by the D'Hondt method, a party-list proportional representation system.

== Members ==
Population reviews of each electoral district are conducted before each general election, which can lead to certain districts being granted a smaller or greater number of parliamentary seats. Kilis is a new province, established in 1995, and is one of Turkey's smallest, having always sent two members of parliament to Ankara.

MPs for Kilis, 1999 onwards
Seat	1999 (21st parliament)	2002 (22nd parliament)	2007 (23rd parliament)	2011 (24th parliament)	June 2015 (25th parliament)
1	Doğan Güreş; DYP	Hasan Kara; AK Party		Fuat Karakuş; AK Party	Reşit Polat; AK Party
2	Mehmet Nacar; MHP	Veli Kaya; AK Party	Hüseyin Devecioğlu; AK Party	Ahmet Salih Dal; AK Party	Mustafa Yün; MHP

== General elections ==
=== 2011 ===
General Election 2011: Kilis
Party	Candidate	Votes	%	±%
AK Party	2 elected 0: 1. Fuat Karakuş ✓; 2. Ahmet Salih Dal ✓	38,967	59.54	▲3.33
MHP	None elected: 1. Mehmet Nacar ✗; 2. Okan Utku Erdem ✗	13,708	20.94	▲0.49
CHP	None elected: 1. Ertuğrul Kekeç ✗; 2. Cuma Dağlı ✗	9,948	15.20	▲4.40
DP	None elected: 1. Mehmet Galip Akdağ ✗; 2. Ahmet Hayrettin Özuymaz ✗	830	1.27	▼4.69
SAADET	None elected: 1. Fatih Karakurt ✗; 2. Mehmet Yaşar Canbal ✗	623	0.95	▼0.37
HAS Party	None elected: 1. Akif Oğuz ✗; 2. Mehmet Dalyanoğlu ✗	584	0.89	▲0.89
Büyük Birlik	None elected: 1. Seydo Yıldırım ✗; 2. Mehmet Korkmaz ✗	227	0.35	▲0.35
DYP	None elected: 1. Ejder Savtur ✗; 2. Fehime Bezirgan ✗	180	0.28	▲0.28
Independent	None elected: Barış Mülhim ✗	83	0.13	0.00
Labour	None elected: 1. Haydar Çiğdemal ✗; 2. Mustafa Cansız ✗	83	0.13	▼0.04
DSP	None elected: 1. Canan Doğan ✗; 2. Hasan Kahraman ✗	75	0.11	N/A'"`UNIQ−−ref−00000011−QINU`"'
Nationalist Conservative	None elected: 1. Zekeriye Ulukışla ✗; 2. İsmet Şahin ✗	50	0.08	▲0.08
MP	None elected: 1. Mehmet Seyit Tekbaş ✗; 2. Ali Galip Emrullah ✗	43	0.07	▲0.07
TKP	None elected: 1. Arzu Kır ✗; 2. Hakan Bulut ✗	39	0.06	▼0.01
Liberal Democrat	None elected: 1. Gülnaz Cenger ✗; 2. İrfan Cenger ✗	12	0.02	▼0.04
HEPAR	No candidates	0	0.00	0.00
Total votes		65,452	100.00	
Rejected ballots		1,236	1.86	▲0.79
Turnout		66,482	87.62	▲3.66
AK Party hold Majority		25,259	38.59	▲2.84

=== June 2015 ===
Abbr.	Party	Votes	%
AK Party	Justice and Development Party	32,279	49.2%
MHP	Nationalist Movement Party	23,375	35.6%
CHP	Republican People's Party	5,042	7.7%
HDP	Peoples' Democratic Party	2,428	3.7%
	Other	2,512	3.8%
Total		65,636	
Turnout		85.61	
source: YSK

=== November 2015 ===
Abbr.	Party	Votes	%
AK Party	Justice and Development Party	43,941	65.6%
MHP	Nationalist Movement Party	12,302	18.4%
CHP	Republican People's Party	8,149	12.2%
HDP	Peoples' Democratic Party	1,041	1.6%
	Other	1,562	2.3%
Total		66,995	
Turnout		86.13	
source: YSK

=== 2018 ===
Abbr.	Party	Votes	%
AK Party	Justice and Development Party	36,706	50%
MHP	Nationalist Movement Party	14,977	20.4%
CHP	Republican People's Party	10,575	14.4%
IYI	Good Party	7,546	10.3%
HDP	Peoples' Democratic Party	1,347	1.8%
SP	Felicity Party	996	1.4%
	Other	1,277	1.7%
Total		73,424	
Turnout		87.75	
source: YSK

== Presidential elections ==
=== 2014 ===
Presidential Election 2014: Kilis
Party	Candidate	Votes	%
AK Party	Recep Tayyip Erdoğan	38.391	64.98
Independent	Ekmeleddin İhsanoğlu	18,456	31.24
HDP	Selahattin Demirtaş	2,237	3.79
Total votes		59,084	100.00
Rejected ballots		1,232	2.04
Turnout		60,316	77.64
Recep Tayyip Erdoğan win			
