= Manisa (electoral district) =

Electoral district for the Grand National Assembly of Turkey

Coordinates: 38.6098°N 27.4280°E

- electoral district for the Grand National Assembly of Turkey
- Manisa shown within Turkey
- Province: Manisa
- Electorate: 965,902

Current electoral district
- Created: 1920
- Seats: 9 Historical: 10 (1999-2015) 11 (1995-1999) 9 (1987-1995) 8 (1983-1987) 10 (1973-1983) 11 (1961-1969) 14 (1957-1961) 12 (1954-1957)
- MPs: List: Hüseyin Tanrıverdi AKP Recai Berber AKP Uğur Aydemir AKP Muzaffer Yurttaş AKP Selçuk Özdağ AKP Hasan Ören CHP Özgür Özel CHP Sakine Öz CHP Sümer Oral MHP Erkan Akçay MHP
- Turnout at last election: 91.58%
- Representation
- AK Party: 4 / 9
- CHP: 3 / 9
- MHP: 2 / 9

Manisa is an electoral district of the Grand National Assembly of Turkey. It elects ten members of parliament (deputies) to represent the province of the same name for a five-year term by the D'Hondt method, a party-list proportional representation system.

== Members ==
Population reviews of each electoral district are conducted before each general election, which can lead to certain districts being granted a smaller or greater number of parliamentary seats. Manisa's seat allocation is ten since 1995.

MPs for Manisa, 1999 onwards
Seat	1999 (21st parliament)	2002 (22nd parliament)	2007 (23rd parliament)	2011 (24th parliament)	June 2015 (25th parliament)
MP	Rıza Akçalı; DYP	Hüseyin Tanrıverdi; AK Party			Murat Baybatur; AK Party
MP	Mehmet Necati Çetinkaya; DYP	Hakan Taşçı; AK Party	Recai Berber; AK Party		
MP	Bülent Arınç; FP	Bülent Arınç; AK Party		Uğur Aydemir; AK Party	
MP	Ekrem Pakdemirli; Anavatan	İsmail Bilen; AK Party		Selçuk Özdağ; AK Party	
MP	Mustafa Cihan Yazar; DSP	Mehmet Çerçi; AK Party		Muzaffer Yurttaş; AK Party	No seat
MP	İsmail Bozdağ; DSP	Mustafa Erdoğan Yetenç; CHP		Hasan Ören; CHP	Mazlum Nurlu; CHP
MP	Hasan Gülay; DSP	Hasan Ören; CHP	Şahin Mengü; CHP	Özgür Özel; CHP	
MP	Ali Serdengeçti; MHP	Ufuk Özkan; CHP	Ahmet Orhan; MHP	Sakine Öz; CHP	Tur Yıldız Biçer; CHP
MP	Mustafa Enöz; MHP	Nuri Çilingir; CHP	Mustafa Enöz; MHP	Sümer Oral; MHP	Zeynel Balkız; MHP
MP	Hüseyin Akgül; MHP	Süleyman Turgut; AK Party	Erkan Akçay; MHP		

== General elections ==
=== 2011 ===
Unelected candidates in small text.

2011 Turkish general election: Manisa
List	Candidates	Votes	Of total (%)	± from prev.
AK Party	Hüseyin Tanrıverdi, Recai Berber, Uğur Aydemir, Muzaffer Yurttaş, Selçuk Özdağ	407,234	46.96	
CHP	Hasan Ören, Özgür Özel, Sakine Öz	249,482	28.77	
MHP	Sümer Oral, Erkan Akçay	146,633	16.91	
Independent	None elected	24,239	2.80	
DP	None elected	10,108	1.17	
SAADET	None elected	5894	0.68	
Büyük Birlik	None elected	5468	0.63	
HAS Party	None elected	5171	0.60	N/A
DSP	None elected	2898	0.33	'"`UNIQ−−ref−0000000E−QINU`"'
DYP	None elected	2898	0.33	
HEPAR	None elected	2519	0.29	
MP	None elected	1967	0.23	
TKP	None elected	1195	0.14	
Nationalist Conservative	None elected	948	0.11	
Liberal Democrat	None elected	0		
Labour	None elected	0		
Turnout		867,225	91.58	

== Presidential elections ==
=== 2014 ===
Presidential Election 2014: Manisa
Party	Candidate	Votes	%
Independent	Ekmeleddin İhsanoğlu	396,939	48.27
AK Party	Recep Tayyip Erdoğan	379,375	46.13
HDP	Selahattin Demirtaş	46,020	5.60
Total votes		822,334	100.00
Rejected ballots		18,012	2.14
Turnout		840,346	84.43
Ekmeleddin İhsanoğlu win			
