= Muş (electoral district) =

Electoral district for the Grand National Assembly of Turkey

Coordinates: 38°59′N 41°41′E

- electoral district for the Grand National Assembly of Turkey
- Muş shown within Turkey
- Province: Muş
- Electorate: 214,282

Current electoral district
- Created: 1920
- Seats: 3 Historical: 4 (1995-2015) 3 (1991-1995) 4 (1987-1991) 3 (1961-1987) 4 (1957-1961) 3 (1954-1957)
- MPs: List: Faruk Işık AKP Muzaffer Çakar AKP Sırrı Sakik BDP Demir Çelik BDP
- Turnout at last election: 81.75%
- Representation
- DEM: 2 / 3
- AK Party: 1 / 3

Muş is an electoral district of the Grand National Assembly of Turkey. It elects four members of parliament (deputies) to represent the province of the same name for a four-year term by the D'Hondt method, a party-list proportional representation system.

== Members ==
Population reviews of each electoral district are conducted before each general election, which can lead to certain districts being granted a smaller or greater number of parliamentary seats. Muş's seat allocation has been remained unchanged at four seats since 1995.

MPs for Muş, 1999 onwards
Seat	1999 (21st parliament)	2002 (22nd parliament)	2007 (23rd parliament)	2011 (24th parliament)	June 2015 (25th parliament)
MP	Eran Kemaloğlu; Motherland	Seracettin Karayağız; AK Party		Faruk Işık; AK Party	No seat
MP	Mümtaz Yavuz; DYP	Medeni Yılmaz; AK Party		Muzaffer Çakar; AK Party	Mehmet Emin Şimşek; AK Party
MP	Sabahattin Yıldız; Virtue	Sabahattin Yıldız; AK Party	Sırrı Sakik; Independent (DTP/BDP)		Ahmet Yıldırım; HDP
MP	Zeki Eker; DSP	Mehmet Şerif Ertuğrul; CHP	Nuri Yaman; Independent (DTP/BDP)	Demir Çelik; Independent (BDP)	Burcu Çelik Özkan; HDP

== General elections ==
=== 2011 ===
2011 Turkish general election: Muş
List	Candidates	Votes	Of total (%)	± from prev.
Independent	Sırrı Sakik, Demir Çelik	75,885	44.26	
AK Party	Faruk Işık, Muzaffer Çakar	73,431	42.83	
MHP	None elected	7517	4.38	
CHP	None elected	7115	4.15	
Büyük Birlik	None elected	2119	1.24	
SAADET	None elected	2038	1.19	
HAS Party	None elected	1144	0.67	N/A
DP	None elected	711	0.41	
DSP	None elected	604	0.35	'"`UNIQ−−ref−0000000D−QINU`"'
TKP	None elected	405	0.24	
DYP	None elected	258	0.15	
Nationalist Conservative	None elected	111	0.06	
MP	None elected	108	0.06	
Liberal Democrat	None elected	0		
HEPAR	None elected	0		
Labour	None elected	0		
Turnout		171,446	81.75	

=== June 2015 ===
Abbr.	Party	Votes	%
HDP	Peoples' Democratic Party	137,878	71.3%
AK Party	Justice and Development Party	46,940	24.3%
MHP	Nationalist Movement Party	3,606	1.9%
CHP	Republican People's Party	2,110	1.1%
	Other	2,777	1.4%
Total		193,311	
Turnout		88.63	
source: YSK

=== November 2015 ===
Abbr.	Party	Votes	%
HDP	Peoples' Democratic Party	112,726	61.8%
AK Party	Justice and Development Party	61,768	33.9%
CHP	Republican People's Party	2,419	1.3%
MHP	Nationalist Movement Party	2,350	1.3%
	Other	3,148	1.7%
Total		182,411	
Turnout		84.43	
source: YSK

=== 2018 ===
Abbr.	Party	Votes	%
HDP	Peoples' Democratic Party	101,744	55.6%
AK Party	Justice and Development Party	57,747	31.5%
IYI	Good Party	7,881	4.3%
MHP	Nationalist Movement Party	6,527	3.6%
CHP	Republican People's Party	3,633	2%
HÜDA-PAR	Free Cause Party	2,784	1.5%
SP	Felicity Party	1,652	0.9%
	Other	1,069	0.6%
Total		183,037	
Turnout		82.82	
source: YSK

== Presidential elections ==
=== 2014 ===
Presidential Election 2014: Muş
Party	Candidate	Votes	%
HDP	Selahattin Demirtaş	105,446	61.24
AK Party	Recep Tayyip Erdoğan	61,250	35.57
Independent	Ekmeleddin İhsanoğlu	5,477	3.18
Total votes		172,173	100.00
Rejected ballots		2,154	1.24
Turnout		174,327	79.10
Selahattin Demirtaş win			
