= Nevşehir (electoral district) =

Electoral district for the Grand National Assembly of Turkey

Coordinates: 38°55′N 34°40′E

Nevsehir
- electoral district for the Grand National Assembly of Turkey
- Nevsehir shown within Turkey
- Province: Nevsehir
- Electorate: 196,854

Current electoral district
- Created: 1920
- Seats: 3 Historical: 4 (1957-1961)
- MPs: List: Ahmet Erdal Feralan AKP Murat Göktürk AKP Ebu Bekir Gizligider AKP
- Turnout at last election: 87.96%
- Representation
- AK Party: 2 / 3
- MHP: 1 / 3

Nevşehir is an electoral district of the Grand National Assembly of Turkey. It elects three members of parliament (deputies) to represent the province of the same name for a four-year term by the D'Hondt method, a party-list proportional representation system.

== Members ==
Population reviews of each electoral district are conducted before each general election, which can lead to certain districts being granted a smaller or greater number of parliamentary seats.

Nevşehir's seat allocation has been remained unchanged at three seats for more than fifty years.

MPs for Nevşehir, 1999 onwards
Seat	1999 (21st parliament)	2002 (22nd parliament)	2007 (23rd parliament)	2011 (24th parliament)	June 2015 (25th parliament)
MP	Mehmet Elkatmış; Virtue	Mehmet Elkatmış; AK Party	Ahmet Erdal Feralan; AK Party		Mustafa Açıkgöz; AK Party
MP	İsmail Çevik; MHP	Osman Seyfi; AK Party	Mahmut Dede; AK Party	Murat Göktürk; AK Party	
MP	Mükremin Taşkın; MHP	Rıtvan Köybaşı; AK Party		Ebu Bekir Gizligider; AK Party	Mehmet Varol; MHP

== General elections ==
=== 2011 ===
2011 Turkish general election: Nevşehir
List	Candidates	Votes	Of total (%)	± from prev.
AK Party	Ahmet Erdal Feralan, Murat Göktürk, Ebu Bekir Gizligider	102,384	60.19	
MHP	None elected	31,031	18.24	
CHP	None elected	27.783	16.33	
SAADET	None elected	2857	1.68	
HAS Party	None elected	1595	0.94	
Büyük Birlik	None elected	1571	0.94	
DP	None elected	1198	0.70	
DYP	None elected	347	0.20	
Labour	None elected	288	0.17	
HEPAR	None elected	270	0.16	
DSP	None elected	270	0.16	'"`UNIQ−−ref−0000000D−QINU`"'
Nationalist Conservative	None elected	180	0.11	
TKP	None elected	136	0.08	
MP	None elected	90	0.05	
Independent	None elected	74	0.04	
Liberal Democrat	None elected	45	0.03	
Turnout		170,101	87.96	

== Presidential elections ==
=== 2014 ===
Presidential Election 2014: Nevşehir
Party	Candidate	Votes	%
AK Party	Recep Tayyip Erdoğan	104,250	64.42
Independent	Ekmeleddin İhsanoğlu	55,319	34.18
HDP	Selahattin Demirtaş	2,267	1.40
Total votes		161,836	100.00
Rejected ballots		3,655	2.21
Turnout		165,491	81.09
Recep Tayyip Erdoğan win			
