= Sakarya (electoral district) =

Electoral district for the Grand National Assembly of Turkey

Coordinates: 40°45′N 30°35′E

- electoral district for the Grand National Assembly of Turkey
- Sakarya shown within Turkey
- Province: Sakarya
- Electorate: 550,883

Current electoral district
- Created: 1920
- Seats: 7 Historical: 6 (1999-2011) 7 (1995-1999) 6 (1987-1995) 5 (1977-1995) 6 (1961-1977) 8 (1957-1961)
- MPs: List: Hasan Ali Çelik AKP Ayhan Sefer Üstün AKP Şaban Dişli AKP Ayşenur İslam AKP Ali İhsan Yavuz AKP Engin Özkoç CHP Münir Kutluata MHP
- Turnout at last election: 89.24%
- Representation
- AK Party: 5 / 7
- CHP: 1 / 7
- Independent: 1 / 7

Sakarya is an electoral district of the Grand National Assembly of Turkey. It elects 7 members of parliament (deputies) to represent the province of the same name for a four-year term by the D'Hondt method, a party-list proportional representation system.

== Members ==
Population reviews of each electoral district are conducted before each general election, which can lead to certain districts being granted a smaller or greater number of parliamentary seats. The number of seats allocated to Sakarya fluctuated between six and seven seats in the last twenty years; most recently it rose to seven seats.

MPs for Sakarya, 1999 onwards
Seat	1999 (21st parliament)	2002 (22nd parliament)	2007 (23rd parliament)	2011 (24th parliament)	June 2015 (25th parliament)
MP	Cevat Ayhan; Virtue	Şaban Dişli; AK Party			Mustafa İsen; AK Party
MP	Nezir Aydın; Virtue	Hasan Ali Çelik; AK Party			Recep Uncuoğlu; AK Party
MP	Osman Fevzi Zihnioğlu; MHP	Ayhan Sefer Üstün; AK Party			Ali İnci; AK Party
MP	Şaban Ramis Savaş; DSP	Erol Aslan Cebeci; AK Party		Ayşenur İslam; AK Party	
MP	Nevzat Ercan; DYP	Recep Yıldırım; AK Party		Ali İhsan Yavuz; AK Party	
MP	Ersin Taranoğlu; Motherland	Süleyman Gündüz; AK Party	Münir Kutluata; MHP		Zihni Açba; MHP
MP	No seat			Engin Özkoç; CHP	

== General elections ==
=== 2011 ===
2011 Turkish general election: Sakarya
List	Candidates	Votes	Of total (%)	± from prev.
AK Party	Hasan Ali Çelik, Ayhan Sefer Üstün, Şaban Dişli, Ayşenur İslam, Ali İhsan Yavuz	334,823	61.62	
CHP	Engin Özkoç	88,043	16.20	
MHP	Münir Kutluata	81,515	15.00	
SAADET	None elected	14,619	2.69	
HAS Party	None elected	9206	1.69	N/A
Independent	Hüseyin Tanış	3450	0.63	
DP	None elected	3237	0.60	
Büyük Birlik	None elected	2144	0.39	
HEPAR	None elected	1547	0.28	
DYP	None elected	1152	0.21	
DSP	None elected	1127	0.21	'"`UNIQ−−ref−00000011−QINU`"'
Labour	None elected	835	0.15	
TKP	None elected	514	0.09	
Nationalist Conservative	None elected	510	0.09	
MP	None elected	375	0.07	
Liberal Democrat	None elected	231	0.04	
Turnout		543,328	89,24	

=== June 2015 ===
Abbr.	Party	Votes	%
AK Party	Justice and Development Party	324,001	56.6%
MHP	Nationalist Movement Party	111,127	19.4%
CHP	Republican People's Party	90,733	15.9%
SP	Felicity Party	22,444	3.9%
HDP	Peoples' Democratic Party	14,772	2.6%
	Other	8,858	1.5%
Total		571,935	
Turnout		88.03	
source: YSK

=== November 2015 ===
Abbr.	Party	Votes	%
AK Party	Justice and Development Party	399,039	67.6%
CHP	Republican People's Party	90,810	15.4%
MHP	Nationalist Movement Party	72,269	12.2%
HDP	Peoples' Democratic Party	9,924	1.7%
SP	Felicity Party	7,860	1.3%
	Other	10,386	1.8%
Total		590,288	
Turnout		89.85	
source: YSK

=== 2018 ===
Abbr.	Party	Votes	%
AK Party	Justice and Development Party	358,992	57.4%
MHP	Nationalist Movement Party	84,952	13.6%
CHP	Republican People's Party	84,316	13.5%
IYI	Good Party	59,290	9.5%
HDP	Peoples' Democratic Party	14,048	2.2%
SP	Felicity Party	11,286	1.8%
	Other	13,002	2.1%
Total		625,886	
Turnout		90.37	
source: YSK

== Presidential elections ==
=== 2014 ===
Presidential Election 2014: Sakarya
Party	Candidate	Votes	%
AK Party	Recep Tayyip Erdoğan	349,218	69.08
Independent	Ekmeleddin İhsanoğlu	144,823	28.65
HDP	Selahattin Demirtaş	11,477	2.27
Total votes		505,518	100.00
Rejected ballots		11,024	2.13
Turnout		516,542	79.04
Recep Tayyip Erdoğan win			
