= Şaban Dişli =

Turkish politician (born 1958)

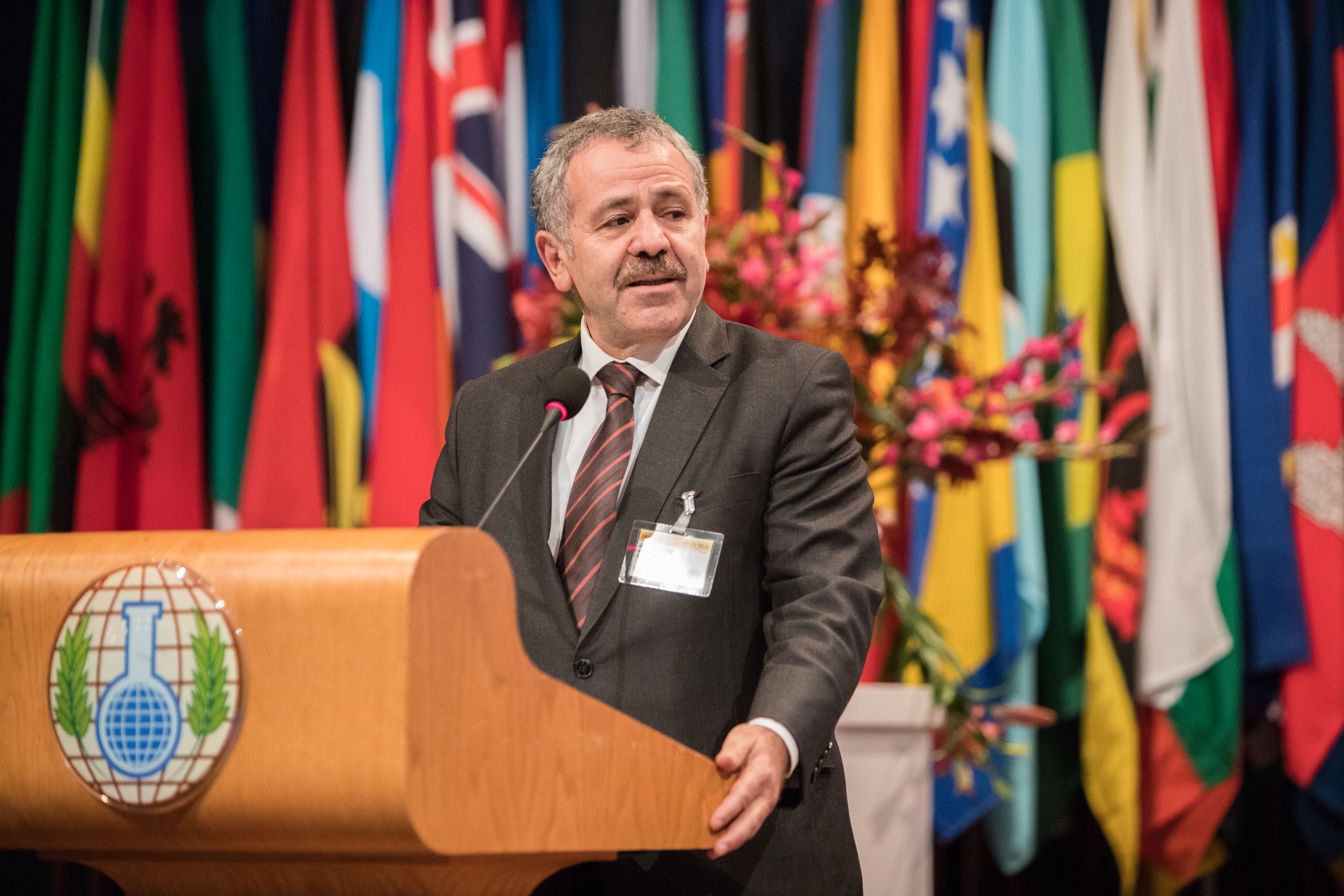
- Șaban Dișli, speaking at OPCW's Fourth Review Conference in The Hague, the Netherlands in November 2018.

Turkish Ambassador to the Netherlands
- In office 7 September 2018 – 31 December 2022
- Preceded by: Sadık Arslan
- Succeeded by: Selçuk Ünal

Member of the Grand National Assembly
- In office 1 November 2015 – 24 June 2018
- Constituency: Sakarya (Nov 2015)
- In office 3 November 2002 – 7 June 2015
- Constituency: Sakarya (2002, 2007, 2011)

Personal details
- Born: 22 February 1958 (age 68) Geyve, Sakarya, Turkey

Şaban Dişli (born 22 February 1958, Geyve, Sakarya, Turkey) is a former Turkish politician, diplomat, and banker. He is a founding member of the Justice and Development Party (AKP) and served four terms as a Member of Parliament representing Sakarya. Over his political career, he has held senior roles within the party, including Vice President and Head of Economic Affairs.

== Early life and education ==
After completing his high school education at Haydarpaşa High School in Istanbul, he earned his undergraduate degree in economics and statistics from the Middle East Technical University (ODTÜ) in November 1979. He also holds a master’s degree in mathematical economics from the State University of New York. He also attended an executive program in business at Harvard University.

== Career ==
=== Career in Banking ===
Dişli began his career in the private sector and later moved to the United States to pursue graduate studies. He earned a master’s degree in mathematical economics from the State University of New York. In 1984, he received an offer from İktisat Bankası, where he worked for three years in the International Relations Department. He then joined Garanti Bank as Deputy Manager and, in 1991, was appointed General Manager of United Garanti International Bank in the Netherlands.

In 1996, Dişli became the General Manager of Demir-Halk Bank (DHB) Rotterdam, where he served until 2002. During this time, he also played a founding role in the Union of Foreign Banks in the Netherlands and served on its board of directors.

=== Political career ===
After returning to Turkey, Dişli entered politics. Following the 2002 general elections, he became the AKP's Head of Foreign Affairs. He was re-elected in 2007 and appointed Vice President for Economic Affairs. He served in the 22nd, 23rd, 24th, and 26th legislative terms and contributed to several international initiatives, including as a member of the Turkey–EU Joint Parliamentary Committee, Chair of the Turkey–Netherlands Interparliamentary Friendship Group, and a delegate to the Parliamentary Assembly of the Council of Europe (PACE). In 2018, he became Chair of the PACE Sub-Committee on Human Rights.

=== Diplomatic service ===
On 23 September 2018, Dişli was appointed as Turkey’s Ambassador to the Kingdom of the Netherlands and the Permanent Representative to the Organisation for the Prohibition of Chemical Weapons (OPCW), a post he held until 2023.

Political offices
| Preceded by Sadık Arslan | Ambassadors of Turkey to the Netherlands; 2018–2022 | Succeeded by Selçuk Ünal |
