= Hakkari (electoral district) =

Electoral district for the Grand National Assembly of Turkey

Coordinates: 37°50′N 34°45′E

- electoral district for the Grand National Assembly of Turkey
- Hakkari shown within Turkey
- Province: Hakkari
- Electorate: 186.358 (2023)

Current electoral district
- Created: 1923
- Seats: 3
- MPs: List: Vezir Coşkun Parlak YSP Öznur Bartın YSP Onur Düşünmez YSP
- Turnout at last election: 83.58%
- Ballot boxes: 511
- Representation
- DEM: 3 / 3

Hakkari is an electoral district of the Grand National Assembly of Turkey which corresponds to Hakkâri Province. It elects three members of parliament (deputies) to represent the province of the same name for a four-year term by the D'Hondt method, a party-list proportional representation system.

== General elections ==
Election results:

=== 2011 ===
| Party | Votes | % | Seats |
|---|---|---|---|
| Peace and Democracy Party | 94,660 | 79.87 | 1 |
| Justice and Development Party | 19,465 | 16.42 | 2 |
| Nationalist Movement Party | 1,224 | 1.03 | – |
| Republican People's Party | 1,065 | 0.90 | – |
| Other | 2,098 | 1.77 | – |
| Total | 118,512 | 100.00 | 3 |
| Valid votes | 118,512 | 97.78 | |
| Invalid/blank votes | 2,687 | 2.22 | |
| Total votes | 121,199 | 100.00 | |
| Registered voters/turnout | 134,632 | 90.02 | |

=== June 2015 ===
| Party | Votes | % | +/– | +/– |
|---|---|---|---|---|
| Peoples' Democratic Party | 122,940 | 86.37 | new | +3 |
| Justice and Development Party | 12,493 | 8.78 | –7.64 | –2 |
| Nationalist Movement Party | 3,576 | 2.51 | +2.48 | – |
| Republican People's Party | 1,453 | 1.02 | +0.12 | – |
| Other | 1,883 | 1.32 | | – |
| Total | 142,345 | 100.00 | – | – |
| Valid votes | 142,345 | 98.67 | | |
| Invalid/blank votes | 1,922 | 1.33 | | |
| Total votes | 144,267 | 100.00 | | |
| Registered voters/turnout | 154,705 | 93.25 | | |

=== November 2015 ===
| Party | Votes | % | +/– | Seats | +/– |
|---|---|---|---|---|---|
| Peoples' Democratic Party | 114,221 | 83.71 | –2.66 | 3 | 0 |
| Justice and Development Party | 17,216 | 12.62 | +3.84 | 0 | 0 |
| Nationalist Movement Party | 1,964 | 1.44 | –1.07 | – | – |
| Republican People's Party | 1,658 | 1.22 | +0.2 | – | – |
| Other | 1,385 | 1.02 | | – | – |
| Total | 136,444 | 100.00 | – | 3 | – |
| Valid votes | 136,444 | 98.12 | | | |
| Invalid/blank votes | 2,611 | 1.88 | | | |
| Total votes | 139,055 | 100.00 | | | |
| Registered voters/turnout | 157,297 | 88.40 | | | |

=== 2018 ===
| Party | Votes | % | +/– | Seats | +/– |
|---|---|---|---|---|---|
| Peoples' Democratic Party | 97,337 | 71.80 | –11.91 | 2 | –1 |
| Justice and Development Party | 25,544 | 18.84 | +6.22 | 1 | +1 |
| Nationalist Movement Party | 4,762 | 3.51 | +2.07 | – | – |
| Republican People's Party | 4,033 | 2.97 | +1.75 | – | – |
| Good Party | 1,633 | 1.20 | new | – | – |
| Free Cause Party | 792 | 0.58 | | – | – |
| Felicity Party | 705 | 0.52 | | – | – |
| Other | 760 | 0.56 | | – | – |
| Total | 135,566 | 100.00 | – | 3 | – |
| Valid votes | 135,566 | 96.64 | | | |
| Invalid/blank votes | 4,710 | 3.36 | | | |
| Total votes | 140,276 | 100.00 | | | |
| Registered voters/turnout | 168,258 | 83.37 | | | |

=== 2023 ===
| Party | Votes | % | Seats | +/– |
|---|---|---|---|---|
| Peoples' Equality and Democracy Party | 95,302 | 64.10 | 3 | +1 |
| Justice and Development Party | 29,092 | 19.57 | 0 | –1 |
| Republican People's Party | 9,915 | 6.67 | – | – |
| Nationalist Movement Party | 3,988 | 2.68 | – | – |
| New Welfare Party | 2,931 | 1.97 | – | – |
| Other | 7,457 | 5.02 | – | – |
| Total | 148,685 | 100.00 | 3 | – |
| Valid votes | 148,685 | 95.46 | | |
| Invalid/blank votes | 7,077 | 4.54 | | |
| Total votes | 155,762 | 100.00 | | |
| Registered voters/turnout | 186,234 | 83.64 | | |

== Presidential elections ==
Results:

=== 2014 ===
| Candidate | Party | Votes | % |
|---|---|---|---|
| Selahattin Demirtaş | People's Democratic Party | 102,408 | 81.60 |
| Recep Tayyip Erdoğan | Justice and Development Party | 20,519 | 16.35 |
| Ekmeleddin İhsanoğlu | Republican People's Party | 2,577 | 2.05 |
| Total | | 125,504 | 100.00 |
| Valid votes | | 125,504 | 98.80 |
| Invalid/blank votes | | 1,519 | 1.20 |
| Total votes | | 127,023 | 100.00 |
| Registered voters/turnout | | 150,165 | 84.59 |

=== 2018 ===
| Candidate | Party | Votes | % |
|---|---|---|---|
| Selahattin Demirtaş | People's Democratic Party | 96,357 | 70.82 |
| Recep Tayyip Erdoğan | Justice and Development Party | 31,010 | 22.79 |
| Muharrem İnce | Republican People's Party | 6,589 | 4.84 |
| Meral Akşener | Good Party | 1,414 | 1.04 |
| Temel Karamollaoğlu | Felicity Party | 566 | 0.42 |
| Doğu Perinçek | Patriotic Party | 124 | 0.09 |
| Total | | 136,060 | 100.00 |
| Valid votes | | 136,060 | 96.92 |
| Invalid/blank votes | | 4,329 | 3.08 |
| Total votes | | 140,389 | 100.00 |
| Registered voters/turnout | | 168,258 | 83.44 |

=== 2023 ===
| Candidate | Party | Votes | % |
|---|---|---|---|
| Kemal Kılıçdaroğlu | Republican People's Party | 109,148 | 72.32 |
| Recep Tayyip Erdoğan | Justice and Development Party | 37,188 | 24.64 |
| Sinan Oğan | Independent | 4,139 | 2.74 |
| Muharrem İnce | Homeland Party | 458 | 0.30 |
| Total | | 150,933 | 100.00 |
| Valid votes | | 150,933 | 96.91 |
| Invalid/blank votes | | 4,805 | 3.09 |
| Total votes | | 155,738 | 100.00 |
| Registered voters/turnout | | 186,234 | 83.62 |
