= Kırşehir (electoral district) =

Electoral district for the Grand National Assembly of Turkey

Coordinates: 39.1460°N 34.1607°E

- electoral district for the Grand National Assembly of Turkey
- Kırşehir shown within Turkey
- Province: Kırşehir
- Electorate: 156,948

Current electoral district
- Created: 1920
- Seats: 2 Historical: 3 (1965-2011) 5 (1961-1965) 4 (1957-1961) 5 (1954-1957)
- MPs: List: Necmettin Erkan AKP Metin İlhan CHP
- Turnout at last election: 84.73%
- Representation
- AK Party: 1 / 2
- CHP: 1 / 2

Kırşehir is an electoral district of the Grand National Assembly of Turkey. It elects fourteen members of parliament (deputies) to represent the province of the same name for a four-year term by the D'Hondt method, a party-list proportional representation system.

== Members ==
Population reviews of each electoral district are conducted before each general election, which can lead to certain districts being granted a smaller or greater number of parliamentary seats. At the last election Kırşehir's seat allocation was reduced to two seats after the province was represented by three MPs for fifty years.

MPs for Kırşehir, 1999 onwards
Seat	1999 (21st parliament)	2002 (22nd parliament)	2007 (23rd parliament)	2011 (24th parliament)	June 2015 (25th parliament)
1	Fikret Tecer; DSP	Hacı Turan; AK Party	Abdullah Çalışkan; AK Party		Salih Çetinkaya; AK Party
2	Mustafa Haykır; MHP	Mikhail Arslan; AK Party		Muzaffer Aslan; AK Party	Cemil Yıldırım Türk; MHP
3	Ramazan Mirzaoğlu; MHP	Hüseyin Bayındır; CHP	Metin Çobanoğlu; MHP	No seat	

== General elections ==
=== June 2015 ===
Abbr.	Party	Votes	%
AKP	Justice and Development Party	52,732	39.6%
MHP	Nationalist Movement Party	42,801	32.1%
CHP	Republican People's Party	25,762	19.4%
HDP	Peoples' Democratic Party	8,121	6.1%
	Other	3,714	2.8%
Total		133,130	
Turnout		85.34	
source: YSK

=== November 2015 ===
Abbr.	Party	Votes	%
AKP	Justice and Development Party	67,797	50.7%
MHP	Nationalist Movement Party	32,496	24.3%
CHP	Republican People's Party	23,941	17.9%
HDP	Peoples' Democratic Party	6,270	4.7%
	Other	3,323	2.5%
Total		133,827	
Turnout		84.83	
source: YSK

=== 2018 ===
Abbr.	Party	Votes	%
AKP	Justice and Development Party	56,059	40.1%
CHP	Republican People's Party	35,870	25.6%
MHP	Nationalist Movement Party	23,573	16.9%
IYI	Good Party	14,338	10.2%
HDP	Peoples' Democratic Party	6,029	4.3%
SP	Felicity Party	1,396	1%
	Other	2,626	1.9%
Total		139,891	
Turnout		86.59	
source: YSK

== Presidential elections ==
=== 2014 ===
Presidential Election 2014: Kırşehir
Party	Candidate	Votes	%
AK Party	Recep Tayyip Erdoğan	62,988	52.82
Independent	Ekmeleddin İhsanoğlu	50,333	42.21
HDP	Selahattin Demirtaş	5,929	4.97
Total votes		119,250	100.00
Rejected ballots		2,190	1.80
Turnout		121,440	76.32
Recep Tayyip Erdoğan win			
