= Electoral system of Turkey =

The electoral system of Turkey varies for general, presidential and local elections that take place in Turkey every five years. Turkey has been a multi-party democracy since 1950 (officially since 1945), with the first democratic election held on 14 May 1950 leading to the end of the single-party rule established in 1923. The current electoral system for electing Members of Parliament to the Grand National Assembly has a 7% election threshold.

A brief summary of the electoral systems used for each type of election is as follows:

- General elections: The D'Hondt method, a party-list proportional representation system, to elect 600 Members of Parliament to the Grand National Assembly from 87 electoral districts that elect different numbers of MPs depending on their populations.
- Local elections: Metropolitan and District Mayors, Municipal and Provincial Councillors, neighbourhood presidents and their village councils elected through a first-past-the-post system, with the winning candidate in each municipality elected by a plurality.
- Presidential elections: A two-round system, with the top two candidates contesting a run-off election two weeks after the initial election should no candidate win at least 50%+1 of the popular vote.

== General elections ==
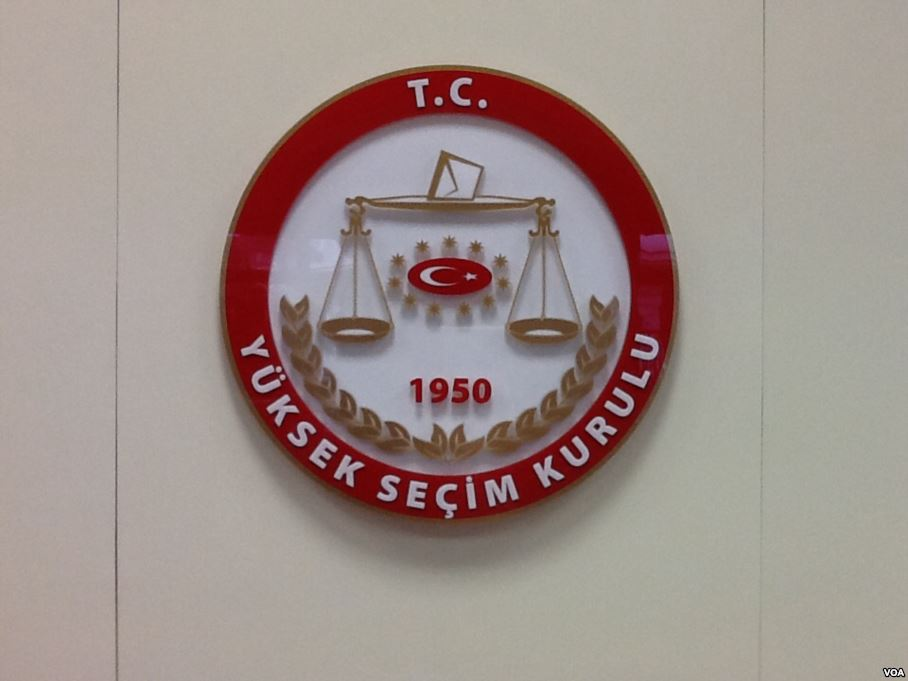
The Supreme Electoral Council of Turkey (Yüksek Seçim Kurulu) oversees the distribution of parliamentary seats per electoral district

Turkey elects 600 Members of Parliament to the Grand National Assembly using the D'Hondt method, a party-list proportional representation system. In order to return MPs to parliament, a party needs to gain more than 7% of the vote nationwide by itself or by being a member of an electoral alliance whose aggregate votes passes the said threshold. This means that parties may win the most votes in certain areas but not win any MPs due to a low result overall. The parliamentary threshold, which stayed as high as 10% between 1982 and 2022, has been subject to intense scrutiny by opposition members, since all votes cast for parties polling under 10% are spoilt and allow the parties overcoming the national threshold to win more seats than correspond to their share of votes. E.g. in the 2002 general election the AK Party won 34.28% of the vote but won nearly two-thirds of the seats.

The parliamentary threshold does not apply to independents, meaning that Kurdish nationalist politicians who poll strongly in the south-east but are not able to win 10% of the overall vote stand as independents rather than as a party candidate. This was the case in the 2007 and 2011 general election, where the Kurdish Democratic Society Party and the Peace and Democracy Party fielded independent candidates respectively.

Ahead of the 2018 general election, Electoral System was altered to accommodate for election alliances, allowing parties to enter elections as coalitions of multiple parties, where as long as the aggregate votes of the alliance passes the electoral threshold the threshold is ignored for the parties within the coalition, effectively opening a way for parties to bypass the electoral threshold. Effects of the change was first observed in the same elections, where Good Party, despite its 9.96% votes laying below the then 10% threshold, was able to enter the parliament due to being part of the larger Nation Alliance, whose total vote was 33.95%.

While initially the D'Hondt method was applied proportionally to all alliance members, a bill overseeing alterations to the election law passed on 31 March 2022 changed the system so that each party that passes the new 7% threshold either by itself or by being a member of an electoral alliance are directly represented by its own votes in each constituency when the calculations of D'Hondt are being made, disallowing smaller members of an electoral alliance from gaining MPs in the strongholds of their larger allies' strongholds due to their overall percentage contribution to the alliance.

=== Proposals for reform ===
The main criticism of the current system has long been the unusually high 10% threshold necessary to gain seats. In January 2015, the CHP renewed their parliamentary proposals to lower the threshold to 3% and proposed no changes to the proportional representation system, though the AK Party has been against lowering the threshold without wider electoral reform.

In July 2013, the AK Party prepared new proposals, named the 'narrow district system' (daraltılmış bölge sistemi), to change the proportional representation system into either a first-past-the-post system or create smaller constituencies which elect a fewer number of MPs. Under these proposals, the threshold would fall from 10% to either 7 or 8% while Turkey would be split into 129 electoral districts rather than the existing 85. Istanbul itself would have been split into 17 or 20 districts. The system will benefit the largest party as well as parties that are the strongest in certain regions, meaning that the AK Party and Kurdish nationalist Peace and Democracy Party (BDP) would make the biggest gains. The two main opposition parties CHP and MHP do not have a substantial number of electoral strongholds, meaning that they would be negatively impacted by a narrow-district system. Proposals by the AK Party to create a full first-past-the-post system with 550 single-member constituencies were allegedly unveiled in December 2014, though any change in electoral law would have to be passed by parliament at least a year before the election. The AKP's proposals for reform have raised concerns about gerrymandering.

Criticisms regarding the high threshold were largely relieved upon the electoral alliance system was adopted, allowing smaller parties to pass the threshold as a member of a larger alliance. Nevertheless, the current 7% threshold is still considerably high, blocking the path of small parties such as Patriotic Party that cannot make their way into a larger alliance. Moreover, the need for a threshold remains to be questionable ever since the presidential elections were split from parliamentary elections since 2018.

=== Electoral districts ===
Turkey is split into 87 electoral districts, which elect a certain number of Members to the Grand National Assembly of Turkey. The Grand National Assembly has a total of 600 seats (increased from 550 seats after 2017 constitutional reforms) a, which each electoral district allocated a certain number of MPs in proportion to their population. The Supreme Electoral Council of Turkey conducts population reviews of each district before the election and can increase or decrease a district's number of seats according to their electorate.

==== Chronological table ====
Number of parliamentary constituencies by province and year
Election year		20th century																					21st century						
Election year		'20	'23	'27	'31	'35	'39	'43	'46	'50	'54	'57	'61	'65	'69	'73	'77	'83	'87	'91	'95	'99	'02	'07	'11	'15	'15	'18	'23
#	Total	436	333	335	348	444	470	492	503	477	537	602	450	450	450	450	450	400	450	450	550	550	550	550	550	550	550	600	600
	Province																												
1	Adana	7	3	4	4	8	11	10	10	11	13	16	12	13	13	13	14	12	14	14	17	14	14	14	14	14	14	15	15
2	Adıyaman											5	4	4	4	4	4	4	4	4	5	6	5	5	5	5	5	5	5
3	Afyonkarahisar	8	6	6	7	7	8	8	8	9	9	10	7	7	7	7	6	5	6	6	7	7	7	7	5	5	5	6	6
4	Ağrı	5	2	3	3	4	4	3	3	3	4	5	3	3	3	4	4	4	4	4	5	4	5	5	4	4	4	4	4
68	Aksaray (Note: Aksaray was a province between 1924-1933 and was a district of Niğde from 1933 to 1989.)		3	3	4															3	4	4	4	4	3	3	3	4	4
5	Amasya	7	4	3	3	3	3	4	4	4	5	6	4	4	4	5	4	4	4	3	4	4	3	3	3	3	3	3	3
6	Ankara	9	7	8	11	15	16	15	18	18	21	22	21	21	24	26	29	23	26	23	28	28	29	29	31	32	32	36	36
7	Antalya	6	4	5	5	8	8	8	7	7	9	9	7	7	7	7	7	7	8	9	10	12	13	13	14	14	14	16	17
75	Ardahan (Note: Ardahan was a province until 1926 and was a district of Kars from 1926 to 1992.)	2	3																		2	2	2	2	2	2	2	2	2
8	Artvin		1	2	2	10	4	4	5	5	5	5	3	3	3	3	3	3	3	2	3	2	2	2	2	2	2	2	2
9	Aydın	7	6	5	6	7	8	9	8	5	8	10	8	8	7	7	7	6	7	6	8	8	8	8	7	7	7	8	8
10	Balikesir	6	8	10	10	12	12	13	14	12	14	15	11	11	10	9	9	7	8	7	9	9	8	8	8	8	8	9	9
74	Bartın																			2	3	2	2	2	2	2	2	2	2
72	Batman																			3	4	4	4	4	4	4	4	5	5
−	Batum (Note: It was left to Georgia with the Treaty of Moscow in 1921.)	5																											
69	Bayburt																			2	2	2	2	2	1	2	2	1	1
−	Biga (Note: In 1923, it became a district of Çanakkale province.)	3	3																										
11	Bilecik	5	5	4	3	3	5	5	3	3	4	4	2	2	2	2	2	2	2	2	2	2	2	2	2	2	2	2	2
12	Bingöl (Note: Genç until 1926, district of Elazig province between 1927-1929 and district of Muş province between 1929-1936.)	6	2				2	2	2	2	3	3	2	2	2	2	2	3	3	3	3	3	3	3	3	3	3	3	3
13	Bitlis	7	2	3			2	2	3	2	2	3	2	2	2	2	2	3	3	3	4	4	4	4	3	3	3	3	3
14	Bolu	8	5	6	6	10	8	8	8	7	8	8	6	6	5	5	5	5	5	5	6	5	3	3	3	3	3	3	3
15	Burdur	7	2	2	2	4	3	4	3	3	4	4	3	3	3	3	2	3	3	3	3	3	3	3	3	3	3	3	3
16	Bursa	7	6	9	9	12	12	12	13	11	13	14	11	11	11	11	11	10	11	12	14	16	16	16	18	18	18	20	20
17	Çanakkale			4	5	5	6	6	6	7	8	8	5	5	5	5	4	4	4	4	5	4	4	4	4	4	4	4	4
18	Çankırı	7	4	4	4	8	6	6	5	5	6	6	4	4	4	3	3	3	3	3	3	3	3	3	2	2	2	2	2
−	Çatalca (Note: In 1926, it became a district of Istanbul province.)		1																										
19	Çorum	7	6	5	6	7	8	9	8	8	9	10	7	7	7	7	6	5	6	5	6	5	5	5	4	4	4	4	4
20	Denizli	6	5	6	6	8	9	10	8	7	9	9	7	7	7	6	6	5	6	6	7	7	7	7	7	7	7	8	7
21	Diyarbakır	7	7	6	4	8	8	6	7	7	8	9	7	7	7	7	7	7	8	8	10	11	10	10	11	11	11	12	12
81	Düzce																						3	3	3	3	3	3	3
22	Edirne	5	3	4	4	4	6	5	5	5	6	6	5	4	4	4	4	4	4	4	4	4	4	4	3	3	3	4	4
23	Elazığ	7	6	7	7	6	5	5	5	5	5	6	5	5	5	5	5	4	5	4	5	5	5	5	5	4	4	5	5
−	Ergani (Note: In 1926, it became a district of Diyarbakır province.)	11	3																										
24	Erzincan	5	3	3	3	4	7	5	7	5	5	6	4	4	4	3	3	3	3	3	4	3	3	3	2	2	2	2	2
25	Erzurum	10	7	7	7	12	9	6	11	10	12	13	9	9	9	9	8	7	7	7	8	8	7	7	6	6	6	6	6
26	Eskişehir	7	4	4	4	5	5	5	7	6	7	8	6	6	6	6	5	5	5	5	6	6	6	6	6	6	6	7	6
26	Gaziantep	6	5	6	5	10	7	8	7	7	8	10	7	7	7	8	8	7	8	9	9	9	10	10	12	12	12	14	14
−	Gelibolu (Note: In 1926, it became a district of Çanakkale province.)	1	1																										
28	Giresun		5	5	5	7	7	9	9	8	8	8	6	6	6	6	5	5	5	4	5	5	5	5	4	4	4	4	4
29	Gümüşhane	6	4	5	3	5	5	5	6	7	6	6	4	4	4	4	3	3	3	2	2	2	2	2	2	2	2	2	2
30	Hakkâri (Note: District of Van province between 1933-1936.)	6	2	1	1		1	1	1	1	1	1	1	1	1	1	1	2	2	2	2	3	3	3	3	3	3	3	3
31	Hatay						5	5	6	6	8	9	7	7	7	7	8	7	9	8	10	10	10	10	10	10	10	11	11
76	Iğdır																				2	2	2	2	2	2	2	2	2
32	Isparta	6	3	4	4	4	5	5	5	5	5	5	4	4	4	4	4	4	4	4	5	4	5	5	4	4	4	4	4
−	İçel (Note: It merged with Mersin Province in 1933.)	6	2	2	2																								
34	Istanbul	12	23	17	18	20	19	28	30	25	29	39	31	31	33	38	44	36	45	50	61	69	70	70	85	88	88	98	98
35	İzmir	8	11	12	12	14	15	17	15	16	20	22	17	17	18	18	19	16	19	19	24	24	24	24	26	26	26	28	28
46	Kahramanmaraş	8	5	5	4	6	5	5	6	7	7	9	6	6	6	7	7	6	7	7	8	9	8	8	8	8	8	8	8
78	Karabük																				3	3	3	3	2	2	2	3	3
70	Karaman																			2	3	3	3	3	2	2	2	3	3
36	Kars	3	2	6	5	8	10	8	10	10	10	12	9	9	9	8	8	6	6	5	4	3	3	3	3	3	3	3	3
37	Kastamonu	8	8	6	8	9	11	9	11	10	10	10	7	7	6	6	5	4	4	4	5	4	4	4	3	3	3	3	3
38	Kayseri	7	5	6	5	10	8	10	9	9	9	11	8	8	8	8	8	7	8	7	9	8	8	8	9	9	9	10	10
71	Kırıkkale																			3	4	4	4	4	3	3	3	3	3
39	Kırklareli		3	3	3	3	5	5	5	5	5	6	4	4	4	3	3	3	3	3	4	3	3	3	3	3	3	3	3
40	Kırşehir (Note: District of Nevşehir Province between 1954-1957.)	7	5	3	3	4	5	4	4	3	5	4	3	3	3	3	3	3	3	3	3	3	3	3	2	2	2	2	2
79	Kilis																				2	2	2	2	2	2	2	2	2
41	Kocaeli	6	6	7	7	10	10	13	10	11	12	5	5	5	4	5	5	5	7	7	9	10	9	9	11	11	11	13	14
42	Konya	10	10	13	14	15	15	15	16	17	19	21	16	16	16	16	16	13	14	13	16	16	16	16	14	14	14	15	15
−	Kozan (Note: In 1926, it became a district of Adana province.)	5	2																										
43	Kütahya	6	8	7	12	11	10	12	10	10	8	8	6	6	6	5	5	5	5	5	6	6	6	6	5	4	4	5	5
−	Lazistan (Note: In 1923, the province of Rize was established in place of the Lazistan Sanjak)	6																											
44	Malatya	11	5	6	6	9	10	11	12	11	12	9	6	6	6	6	6	6	6	6	7	7	7	7	6	6	6	6	6
45	Manisa	9	10	10	11	12	13	12	12	12	12	14	11	11	11	10	10	8	9	9	11	10	10	10	10	9	9	10	10
47	Mardin	6	6	5	3	7	8	7	10	7	7	8	6	6	6	6	6	5	6	5	6	6	6	6	6	6	6	6	6
33	Mersin	7	2	2	3	5	7	8	8	7	8	9	7	7	7	7	8	7	9	9	12	12	12	12	11	11	11	13	13
48	Muğla	11	3	4	4	6	6	6	5	5	6	7	5	5	5	5	4	4	5	5	6	6	6	6	6	6	6	7	7
49	Muş (Note: District of Bitlis province between 1925-1929.)	7	3		4	4	2	2	3	2	3	4	3	3	3	3	3	3	4	3	4	4	4	4	4	3	3	4	3
50	Nevşehir											4	3	3	3	3	3	3	3	3	3	3	3	3	3	3	3	3	3
51	Niğde	6	4	4	4	7	7	8	7	8	8	7	5	5	5	5	5	5	5	3	4	3	3	3	3	3	3	3	3
−	Oltu (Note: In 1926, it became a district of Erzurum province.)	2																											
52	Ordu		5	6	6	7	8	8	9	8	9	10	8	8	8	8	7	6	7	6	8	7	7	7	6	5	5	6	6
80	Osmaniye (Note: Cebel-i Bereket Province until 1933, district of Adana Province between 1933-1996.)	3	2	5	3																	4	4	4	4	4	4	4	4
53	Rize (Note: Between 1933 and 1936, it merged with Çoruh Province, with the center being Rize.)		6	6	6		6	6	6	6	6	6	4	4	4	4	4	4	4	3	4	3	3	3	3	3	3	3	3
54	Sakarya											8	6	6	6	6	5	5	6	6	7	6	6	6	7	7	7	7	8
55	Samsun	6	3	6	7	9	9	11	10	10	12	14	11	11	11	10	10	8	9	9	11	10	9	9	9	9	9	9	9
56	Siirt	6	2	2	2	6	5	5	4	4	4	5	4	4	4	4	4	4	5	3	3	3	3	3	3	3	3	3	3
57	Sinop	6	4	3	4	6	5	5	5	5	6	6	4	4	4	3	3	3	3	3	3	3	3	3	2	2	2	2	2
58	Sivas	8	7	7	7	11	11	15	12	13	14	15	11	11	10	9	8	7	7	6	7	6	6	6	5	5	5	5	5
−	Siverek (Note: In 1926, it became a district of Şanlıurfa province.)	6	4																										
63	Şanlıurfa	5	6	5	6	7	7	6	7	7	8	9	7	7	6	7	7	5	7	8	9	11	11	11	12	12	12	14	14
−	Şebinkarahisar (Note: It became a district of Giresun province in 1933)	5	4	3	3																								
73	Şırnak																			3	3	3	3	3	4	4	4	4	4
59	Tekirdağ		2	3	4	5	5	6	6	5	6	6	4	4	4	4	4	4	4	4	5	5	5	5	6	6	6	7	8
60	Tokat	7	4	5	6	8	9	8	10	9	9	10	7	7	7	7	7	6	6	6	7	6	7	7	5	5	5	5	5
61	Trabzon	11	7	8	9	9	11	11	12	12	12	12	9	9	9	8	8	6	7	6	8	7	8	8	6	6	6	6	6
62	Tunceli (Note: District of Elazığ between 1926-1936.)	6	2				3	2	2	2	3	3	2	2	2	2	2	2	2	2	2	2	2	2	2	2	2	2	1
64	Uşak										4	4	3	3	3	3	3	3	3	3	3	3	3	3	3	3	3	3	3
65	Van	7	3	2	2	3	3	4	3	3	4	5	3	4	4	4	4	4	5	5	6	7	7	7	8	8	8	8	8
77	Yalova																				2	2	2	2	2	2	2	3	3
66	Yozgat	7	4	5	6	7	7	7	8	7	8	9	6	6	6	6	6	5	5	5	6	6	6	6	4	4	4	4	4
67	Zonguldak		4	7	6	10	10	11	9	10	10	12	9	9	9	9	9	8	9	7	6	6	5	5	5	5	5	5	5
#	Total	436	333	335	348	444	470	492	503	477	537	602	450	450	450	450	450	400	450	450	550	550	550	550	550	550	550	600	600

In all but four cases, electoral districts share the same name and borders of the 81 Provinces of Turkey. The exceptions are İzmir, Istanbul, Bursa and Ankara. Provinces electing between 19 and 36 MPs are split into two electoral districts, while any province electing above 36 MPs are divided into three. As the country's four largest provinces, İzmir and Bursa are divided into two subdistricts while Ankara and Istanbul is divided into three. The distribution of elected MPs per electoral district is shown below.

District	MPs
Adana	15
Adıyaman	5
Afyonkarahisar	6
Ağrı	4
Aksaray	4
Amasya	3
Ankara	36
Ankara (I)	13
Ankara (II)	11
Ankara (III)	12
Antalya	17
Ardahan	2
Artvin	2
Aydın	8

District	MPs
Balıkesir	9
Bartın	2
Batman	5
Bayburt	1
Bilecik	2
Bingöl	3
Bitlis	3
Bolu	3
Burdur	3
Bursa	20
Bursa (I)	10
Bursa (II)	10
Çanakkale	4
Çankırı	2

District	MPs
Çorum	4
Denizli	7
Diyarbakır	12
Düzce	3
Edirne	4
Elazığ	5
Erzincan	2
Erzurum	6
Eskişehir	6
Gaziantep	14
Giresun	4
Gümüşhane	2
Hakkâri	3
Hatay	11

District	MPs
Iğdır	2
Isparta	4
Istanbul	98
Istanbul (I)	35
Istanbul (II)	27
Istanbul (III)	36
İzmir	28
İzmir (I)	14
İzmir (II)	14
Kahramanmaraş	8
Kars	3
Kastamonu	3
Karabük	3

District	MPs
Karaman	3
Kayseri	10
Kilis	2
Kırklareli	3
Kırıkkale	3
Kırşehir	2
Kocaeli	14
Konya	15
Kütahya	5
Malatya	6
Manisa	10
Mardin	6
Mersin	13

District	MPs
Muğla	7
Muş	3
Nevşehir	3
Niğde	3
Ordu	6
Osmaniye	4
Rize	3
Sakarya	8
Samsun	9
Siirt	3
Sinop	2
Sivas	5
Şanlıurfa	14

District	MPs
Şırnak	4
Tekirdağ	8
Tokat	5
Trabzon	6
Tunceli	1
Uşak	3
Van	8
Yalova	3
Yozgat	4
Zonguldak	5
Total	600

==== Changes in 2023 ====
The number of MPs elected per electoral district for the 2023 general election

The number of MPs of those ten electoral districts has been changed by the electoral council as listed below.

District	2018	2023	change
Antalya	16	17	▲1
Denizli	8	7	▼1
Eskişehir	7	6	▼1
Istanbul	98	98	Steady
Istanbul (II)	28	27	▼1
Istanbul (III)	35	36	▲1

District	2018	2023	change
Kocaeli	13	14	▲1
Muş	4	3	▼1
Sakarya	7	8	▲1
Tekirdağ	7	8	▲1
Tunceli	2	1	▼1

==== Changes in 2018 ====
In 2018, total MPs are increased from 550 to 600. Due to this increase, several districts had more MPs. Ankara and Bursa divided into one more electoral district due to this increase. However, Bayburt is represented with one less MP in 2018, making it the only district with a single MP.

==== Changes since 2011 ====
A total of eight electoral districts had their number of MPs adjusted since the 2011 general election by the electoral council, as listed below. The two electoral districts of Ankara also had their boundaries changed.

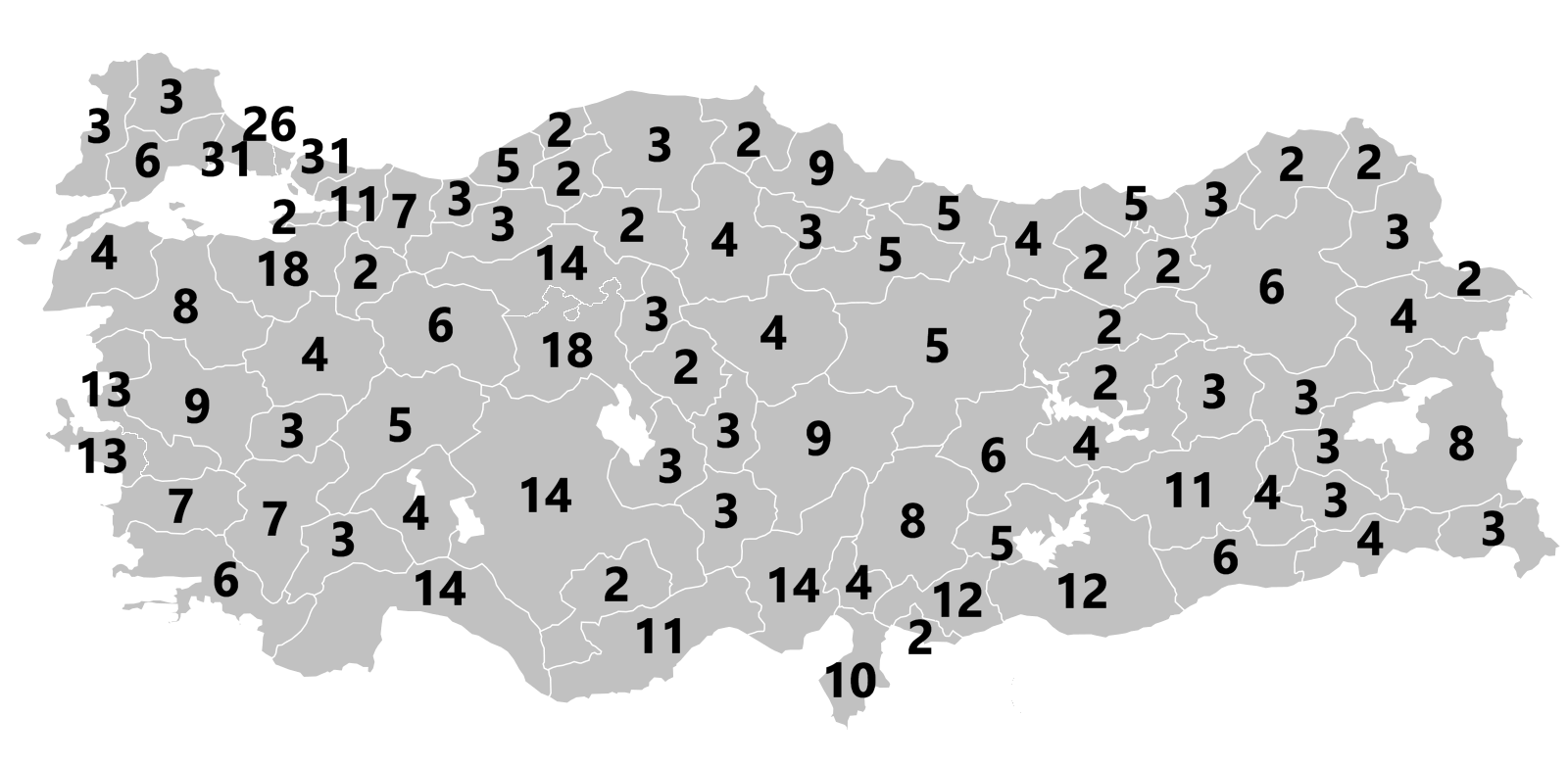
The number of MPs elected per electoral district for the 2015 general election

District	2011	2015	change
Ankara	31	32	▲1
Ankara (I)	16	18	▲2
Ankara (II)	15	14	▼1
Bayburt	1	2	▲1
Elazığ	5	4	▼1
Istanbul	85	88	▲3
Istanbul (I)	30	31	▲1

District	2011	2015	change
Istanbul (II)	27	26	▼1
Istanbul (III)	28	31	▲3
Kütahya	5	4	▼1
Manisa	10	9	▼1
Muş	4	3	▼1
Ordu	6	5	▼1

=== Votes required per MP by province ===
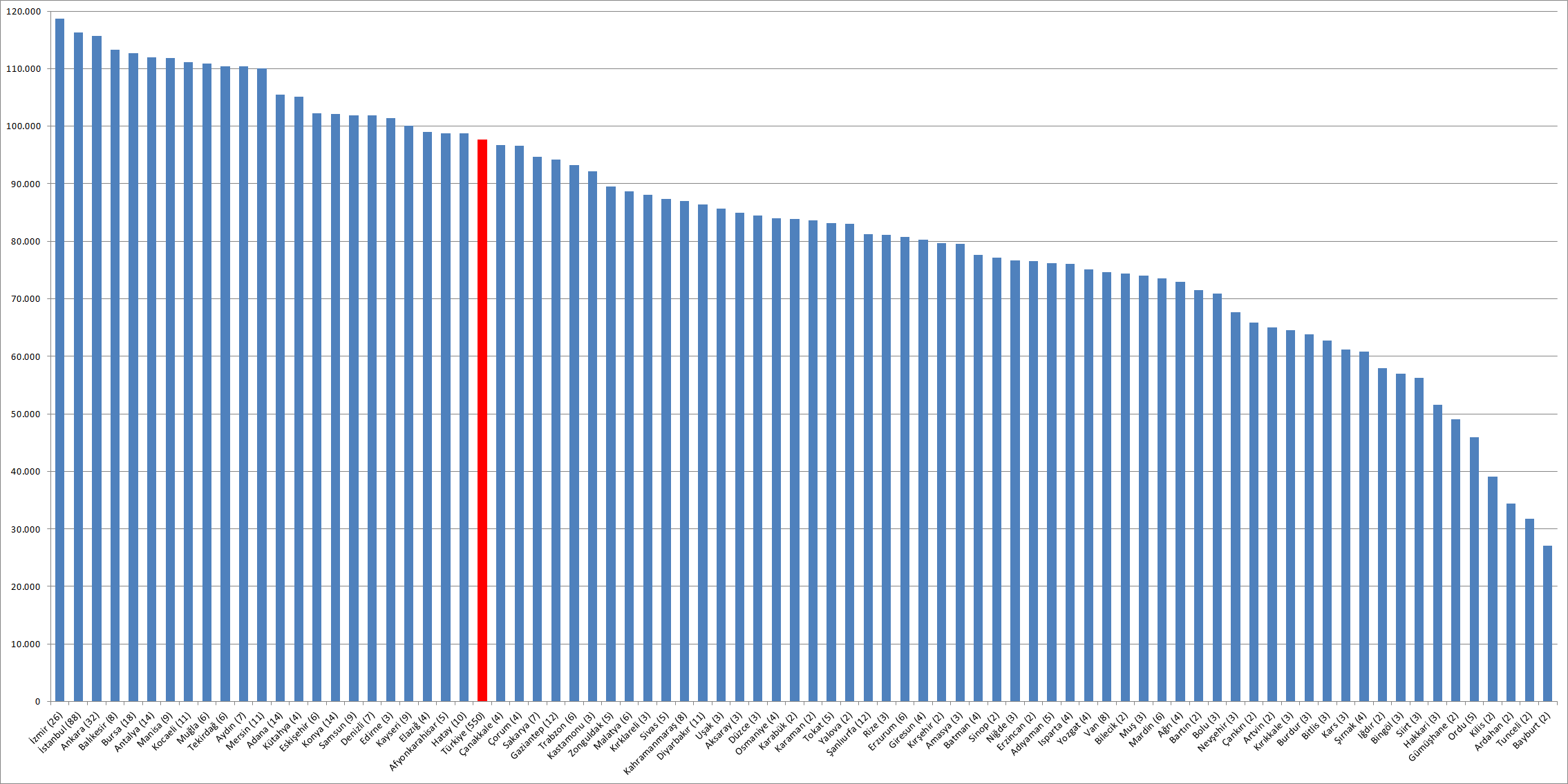
Votes required for each MP in different provinces of Turkey

The number of voters in each province was announced on 17 May 2015. In total, there are 53,741,838 voters in the provinces, which corresponds to 97,712 voters for each MP. However, because of the electoral system, this was not distributed equally to the provinces. In İzmir, where voters per MP was the highest, 118,669 votes corresponded to an MP, whereas in Bayburt, 27,089 voters were represented by an MP.

Two factors caused this more than fourfold disparity. Namely, the electoral law favours provinces smaller in size, which caused İzmir, Istanbul and Ankara, Turkey's largest cities and provinces, to have the least representation per voter. Secondly, the distribution of MPs to provinces was based not on the number of eligible voters, but on total population, which made each vote more valuable in provinces with a young population. For example, the HDP stronghold Hakkari with 154,705 voters got 3 MPs, whereas Yalova with 166,060 voters got 2 MPs. Similarly, Van, another HDP stronghold with 596,809 voter got 8 MPs, whereas Muğla, a CHP stronghold with 665,608 voters got 6 MPs. In Şanlıurfa where AKP and HDP are strong, there were 12 MPs per 974,219 voters, whereas in Manisa, where CHP and MHP perform better than average, votes of 1,006,697 voters determined only 9 MPs. Yusuf Halaçoğlu's bill which would partly mitigate this disparity was rejected in the parliament.

=== Parliamentary arithmetic ===
In order to pursue constitutional changes, a party needs either a three-fifths majority or a two-thirds majority, which give the government different powers. These are documented in the table below (valid by 2018 elections).

- 301 seats – Resist a vetoed law
- 360 seats – Put proposed constitutional changes to a referendum (three-fifths majority)
- 400 seats – Change the constitution without needing a referendum (two-thirds majority)

== Local elections ==
=== 2013 local government reform ===
Before the elections, the numbers of councillors and mayors were reduced during the 2013 Turkish local government reorganisation. During the reorganisation, 1,040 beldes were abolished, leaving the number of small town municipalities at 394 and contributing to the reduction in the number of mayors elected in 2014 in comparison to 2009.

The following table shows the numbers of metropolitan and district municipalities, as well as provincial and municipal councillors elected in 2009 and in 2014. In local elections, municipal mayors and councillors are the only partisan officials elected.

Office	Elected in 2009	Elected in 2014	Change
Metropolitan municipalities	16	30	▲14
District municipalities	2,903	1,351	▼1,552
Provincial councillors	3,281	1,251	▼2,030
Municipal councillors	32,392	20,500	▼11,892
Total	38,592	23,132	▼15,460
