= 1923 Turkish general election =

← 1920	28 June 1923	1927 →

All 333 seats in the Grand National Assembly 167 seats needed for a majority
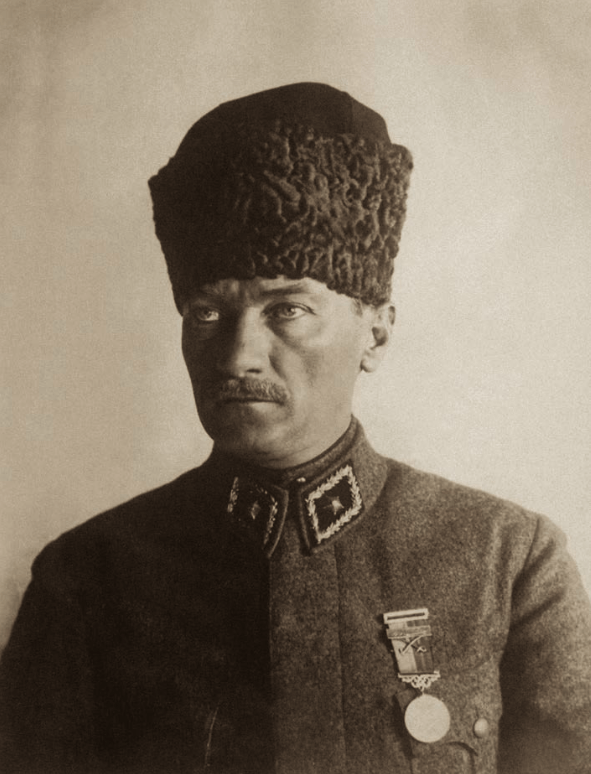
	First party
Leader	Mustafa Kemal Pasha
Party	ARMHC
Seats won	285
Prime Minister before election
Rauf Orbay
ARMHC
Elected Prime Minister
Rauf Orbay
ARMHC

General elections were held in Turkey in 1923. The Association for Defence of National Rights (later Republican People's Party) was the only party in the country at the time.

== Electoral system ==
The elections were held under the Ottoman electoral law passed in 1908, which provided for a two-stage process. In the first stage voters elected secondary electors (one for the first 750 voters in a constituency, then one for every additional 500 voters). In the second stage the secondary electors elected the members of the Turkish Grand National Assembly. However, a second law was passed on 3 April 1923 lowering the voting age to 18 and abolishing the tax-paying requirement.
