= Nation Party (Turkey, 1992) =

Nation Party Millet Partisi
- Leader: Cuma Nacar
- Founded: 23 November 1992
- Headquarters: Kızılay, Ankara, Turkey
- Membership (2026): ▲4,659
- Ideology: Conservatism; Turkish nationalism National conservatism
- Political position: Right-wing

Website
- https://www.milletpartisi.org.tr/

The Nation Party (Turkish: Millet Partisi) is a conservative and nationalistic political party in Turkey. It was formed in 1992, when the Reformist Democracy Party (Islahatçı Demokrasi Partisi), led by Aykut Edibali, renamed itself.
