= Rights and Equality Party =

Rights and Equality Party Hak ve Eşitlik Partisi
- Leader: Yücel Savaş
- Founder: Osman Pamukoğlu
- Founded: 4 September 2008
- Dissolved: 21 April 2019
- Headquarters: Mareşal Fevzi Çakmak Cad. No:37 Beşevler, Ankara
- Ideology: Turkish nationalism Patriotism; Kemalism; Pan-Turkism; Halkçılık; Social justice
- Colours: Red, white, black

The Rights and Equality Party (Turkish: Hak ve Eşitlik Partisi, HEPAR) was a political party in Turkey, founded on 4 September 2008 by Osman Pamukoğlu, a former army general known for his military successes against the Kurdistan Workers' Party in the 1990s during the Kurdish–Turkish conflict.

The party's main manifest was the setting sovereignty, own based economical development and peace for Turkish citizens. The party had 8,273 members as of 2014.

The party claimed their ideology as being neither on the right nor left, above all with populist, nationalist aiming social justice for Turkish citizens. The party chairman Osman Pamukoğlu often mentioned Mustafa Kemal Atatürk's quote as "Our target is being a merged society with no classes and privileges."

The party gained 121,814 votes during the 2011 elections, comprising 0.28% of the votes.

The party announced its end of activities during an extraordinary convention on 21 April 2019.
