= People's Voice Party =

People's Voice Party Halkın Sesi Partisi
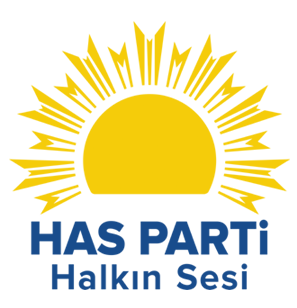
- Leader: Numan Kurtulmuş
- Founded: 1 November 2010
- Dissolved: 19 September 2012
- Split from: Felicity Party
- Merged into: Justice and Development Party
- Headquarters: Oğuzlar Mahallesi 1397. sokak No:14; 06520 Balgat - Ankara
- Ideology: Religious conservatism
- Political position: Center-right
- Colors: Blue; Yellow; White

The People's Voice Party (Turkish Halkın Sesi Partisi, abbreviated HSP but using the self-styled abbreviation HAS PARTİ, which literally means "PURE PARTY") was a religious conservative political party in Turkey. It was founded on 1 November 2010 by Numan Kurtulmuş and dissolved on 19 September 2012.

In September 2012, after less than two years, an extraordinary party congress decided to dissolve the party and join the ruling Justice and Development Party (AKP). In July 2012, following long-held speculation that Numan Kurtulmuş was on Prime Minister Erdoğan’s mind as his possible successor as party head, Erdoğan personally proposed to Kurtulmuş the idea of merging the parties under the umbrella of the AKP.
