= Nationalist and Conservative Party =

Political party

Nationalist and Conservative Party (Turkish: Milliyetçi ve Muhafazakâr Parti) was a Turkish nationalist and conservative political party founded in 2010. The party received 0.09% of the vote in the 2011 general election.
