= Ekmeleddin İhsanoğlu =

Turkish academic, politician and diplomat (born 1943)

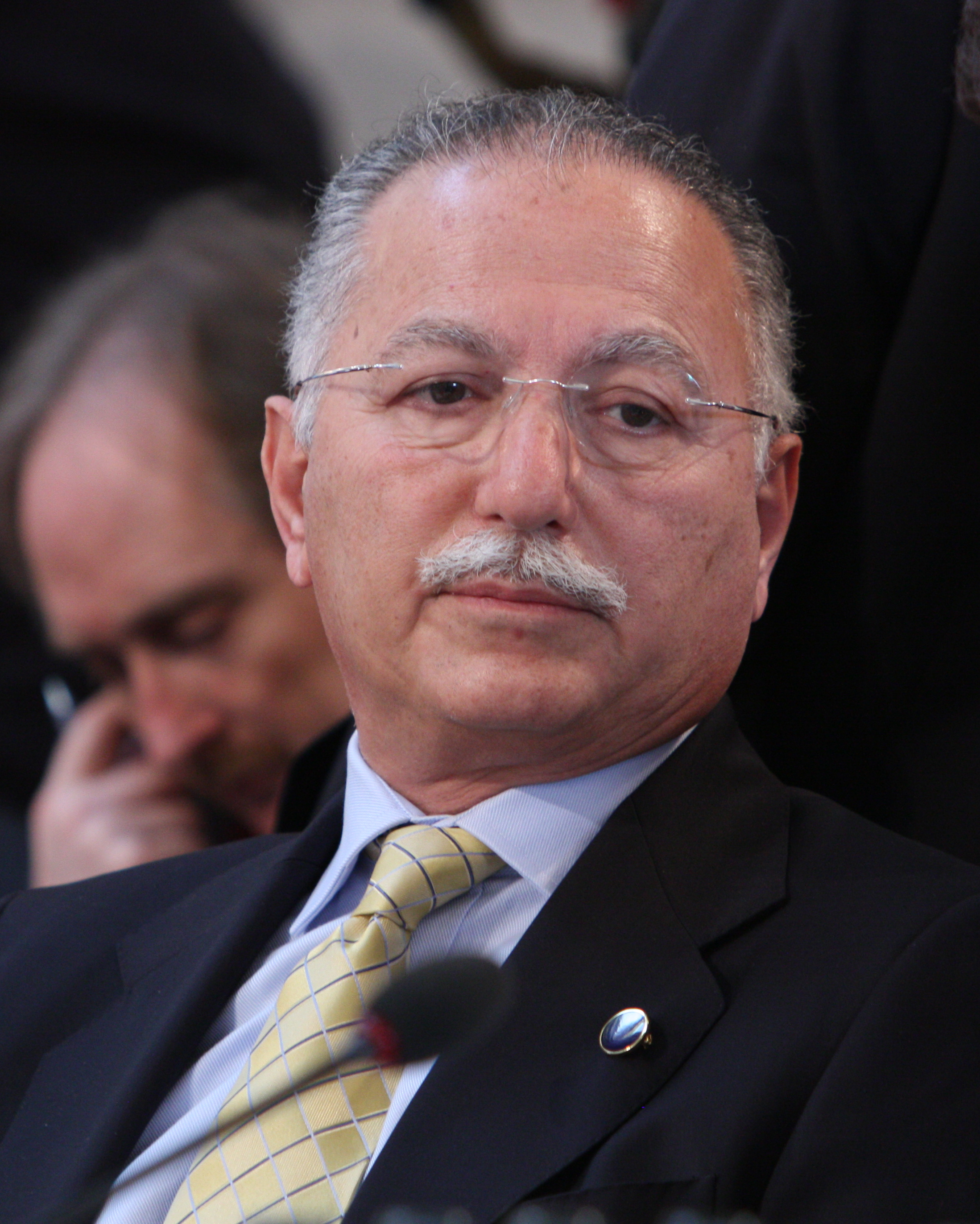
- İhsanoğlu in 2012

Member of the Grand National Assembly
- In office 7 June 2015 – 24 June 2018
- Constituency: İstanbul (II) (June 2015, Nov 2015)

Secretary-General of the Organisation of Islamic Cooperation
- In office 31 December 2004 – 31 January 2014
- Preceded by: Abdelouahed Belkeziz
- Succeeded by: Iyad bin Amin Madani

Personal details
- Born: 26 December 1943 (age 82) Cairo, Egypt
- Party: Independent (2014–2015) Nationalist Movement Party (2015–present)
- Spouse: Füsun İhsanoğlu
- Children: 3
- Education: Ain Shams University; Al-Azhar University; Ankara University
- Website: Official website

Ekmeleddin Mehmet İhsanoğlu (Turkish pronunciation: [ecmeledˈdin ihˈsanoːɫu]; born 26 December 1943) is a Turkish chemistry and science history professor, academician, diplomat and politician who was Secretary-General of the Organisation of Islamic Cooperation (OIC) from 2004 to 2014. He is also an author and editor of academic journals and advocate of intercultural dialogue.

İhsanoğlu studied science at the Ain Shams University, where he received his BSc in 1966. He remained in Cairo and obtained his MSc in 1970 from Al-Azhar University. İhsanoğlu received his PhD from the Faculty of Science at the Ankara University in 1974. İhsanoğlu's academic work has focused on the history of scientific activity and institutions of learning within Islam, cultural exchanges between Islam and the West, the relationship between science and religion, and the development of science in its socio-cultural environment.

İhsanoğlu was the founder of the Department of History of Science at the Faculty of Letters of Istanbul University, and he remained the chairman of that department between 1984 and 2003. He was also a lecturer and a visiting professor at various universities, including Ankara University, University of Exeter, United Kingdom (1975–1977), Inönü University in Malatya (1970–1980), and LMU Munich in Germany (2003).

After taking the office as the ninth Secretary General of the OIC in January 2005, İhsanoğlu coordinated the drafting and implementation of a reform program for the OIC aiming to increase the efficiency and effectiveness of the 57-member Organisation. The reform program's components included the "Ten-Year Programme of Action to Face the Challenges of Twenty-first Century" (later implemented by the Third Extraordinary Islamic Summit Conference in 2005) and a revised OIC Charter which was adopted by the OIC at the Eleventh Islamic Summit Conference in 2008. İhsanoğlu was one of the signatories of A Common Word, an open letter by Islamic scholars to Christian leaders that called for peace and understanding.

İhsanoğlu was announced as the joint candidate of the two opposition parties in the Turkish parliament, the Republican People's Party (CHP) and the Nationalist Movement Party (MHP), for the 2014 presidential election. He was also supported by 11 other smaller opposition parties. He lost in the first round with 38.44% of the votes. In the June 2015 general election, İhsanoğlu was elected as Member of Parliament for the MHP for İstanbul's 2nd electoral district. He was the MHP's candidate to become the Speaker of Parliament in the June–July 2015 speaker elections, but he was eliminated in the third round. Then he became a member of the Parliamentary Assembly of the Council of Europe.

== Early life ==
İhsanoğlu was born Ekmellettin Muhammet İhsan to madrasa professor İhsan Efendi, hailing from Yozgat, and Seniye Hanım. Seniye Hanım was the daughter of Rhodian Turkish parents. İhsanoğlu was born in Cairo, Egypt.

== Academic career ==
Prof. İhsanoğlu has been a pioneering figure in the history of science, especially of science in the Muslim world. He has worked on three main subjects since late 70's.

- The first is the scientific activities of the 14th–19th centuries, which are considered outside the scope of the Golden Age of Islam.
- The second is the introduction of the modern science and technology to the Muslim world and the attitude of the Muslim scholars.
- The third is the history of institutions of science in Islam.

With Prof. Celal Tüzün, İhsanoğlu founded the Research Institute for Organic Chemistry when he was a faculty member at the Faculty of Science of the University of Ankara. İhsanoğlu is the founder and first chair (1984–2000) of the first Department of History of Science in Turkey, which he established at the Faculty of Letters of Istanbul University.

The scholarly positions he filled include visiting professor at LMU Munich in Germany, 2003; lecturer and associate professor at Ankara University, Faculty of Science, Turkey 1970–1980; and research fellow at the Department of Chemistry of the University of Exeter, United Kingdom 1975–1977. At the very beginning of his career İhsanoğlu was lecturer of Turkish Literature and Language at Ain Shams University, Cairo, Egypt, 1966–1970; research assistant at the Faculty of Engineering and Science, Al-Azhar University, Cairo, 1966–1970; and part-time cataloger of printed and manuscript Ottoman books, Cairo National Library, Department of Oriental Catalogues, Egypt, 1962–1966.

Prof. İhsanoğlu supervised many international projects sponsored by UNESCO and IRCICA; Master and PhD thesis's on History of Science. His publications and academic activities were appreciated by many international awards. Among them Koyré Medal in History of Science given by the International Academy of the History of Science (Paris, 2008) and Kuwait Foundation For The Advancement of Sciences (KFAS), Golden Medal and KFAS shield Award for Arabic and Islamic Scientific Heritage, 2021.

As part of his academic career İhsanoğlu has held the following positions: member of Academie Europea; member of the Académie Internationale d’Histoire des Sciences, Paris; member, Academy of Sciences of Tatarstan, Russia; honorary member of Gesellschaft der Freunde Islamischer Kunst und Kultur e. V., München, Germany; honorary member, Hungarian Orientalistik Society, Budapest; correspondent member, Arab Language Academy, Cairo; Royal Academy of Islamic Civilization Research, Jordan; member, International Society for History of Arabic and Islamic Sciences and Philosophy, Paris; Governing Board member, Centre of Manuscripts, Library of Alexandria, Egypt, 2003, Advisory Board Member, Tufts University, Fares Center for Eastern Mediterranean Studies, Boston; member of the Scientific Committee of ALECSO for the preparation of “Encyclopaedia of Renown Arab & Muslim Scholars”, 2001; member of the Board of Publications and Translations of the Ministry of Culture, Turkey, 1974–1980 and 1999-; Advisory Board Member, Centre of Islamic Studies, School of Oriental & African Studies (SOAS), University of London, England, 1998–; Advisory Board Member, Centre for Middle Eastern Studies (CMES), Harvard University, United States, 1992–1996; OMETAR Project Director (history of science, education & technology databank collection), IRCICA, Istanbul, 1995–; Member of Scientific Council and Board of Consultants of Encyclopaedia of Makkah al-Mukarrama and Medina Al-Munawwara, Kingdom of Saudi Arabia, 1994-; Member of advisory board and Experts Board of Al-Furqan Islamic Heritage Foundation, London, 1991–; project director and editor of UNESCO's Work on Various Aspects of Islamic Culture, 1988-, published in 2004; honorary member, Egyptian History Society, Cairo; member, Tunisian Academy of Sciences, Letters and Arts “Beit al-Hikma”, Tunis; member, International Society for History of Medicine, Paris, France; chairman of the Board of Trustees, Islamic-American College, Chicago.

In addition to Turkish, he is advanced at English and Arabic, and has a working knowledge of French and Persian.

== Diplomatic career ==
In the 1970s, İhsanoğlu took part in Turkey's various diplomatic and cultural missions and committees formed for conducting international consultations or talks at bilateral and multilateral levels.

İhsanoğlu was the founding Director General of the Research Centre for Islamic History, Art and Culture IRCICA. an intergovernmental research centre and subsidiary organ of the OIC. When IRCICA started its activities in 1980, it was the first international organization established in Istanbul. İhsanoğlu as the head of diplomatic mission in this organization and as a cultural diplomat has served more than twenty-four years in promoting intercultural dialogue, relations, tolerance and understanding.

İhsanoğlu participated in various projects, activities and committees of UNESCO, and acted as the project director and editor of UNESCO's Work on Various Aspects of Islamic Culture, in 1988, published in 2004.

İhsanoğlu was appointed ‘Ambassador at Large’ by the first President of Bosnia and Herzegovina Alija Izetbegović in 1997 for his services to Bosnia-Herzegovina. He is also serving as ‘Honorary Consul’ of the Gambia since 1990.

İhsanoğlu lived the most significant leap in his diplomatic career in 2004 when he succeeded to win the election for the position of the OIC Secretary General out of three candidates. He has become the first by-vote-elected Secretary General of the OIC.

In his former position, since January 2005, as the Secretary General of the 57-member Organisation, the second largest organisation after the UN, Prof. İhsanoğlu initiated new schemes and strategies of international cooperation with regard to promotion of understanding, tolerance, principles of human rights, democracy, and establishment of dialogue between the OIC's Member States and with other countries and communities of the world.

The Heads of State and Government of the OIC Member States, convened at their 11th Islamic Summit Conference (Dakar, Senegal, March 2008), unanimously decided to renew İhsanoğlu's mandate for another term of office.

== Secretary General of the OIC ==
Within the framework of his mission as Secretary General of OIC, Prof. İhsanoğlu took several initiatives to reform the OIC's agenda and strategies in various fields, with the motto: “modernisation and moderation”. As of his first year in the office, he guided the preparation of the “Ten-Year Programme Of Action To Meet The Challenges Facing The Muslim Ummah In The 21st Century” which was adopted by the OIC Member States at their Extraordinary Summit Conference in Mecca, December 2005. Through this programme and the new Charter of the OIC which was adopted by the Eleventh Summit Conference in March 2008, he introduced the application of some concepts and principles for the first time in the OIC. Thus, for example,

- the issue of human rights was introduced to the new Charter of the OIC and the Ten-Year Programme of Action. The new Charter of the OIC stipulates the establishment of an independent Permanent Commission on Human Rights to promote the civil, political, social and economic rights enshrined in the Organisation's covenants and declarations and in universally agreed human rights instruments;
- definition of and action to combat the problem of terrorism was introduced to the Ten-Year Programme of Action (Chapter VI on Combating terrorism);
- objectives were adopted in the same Programme of Action emphasizing cultural dialogue (Chapter III on “Islam- The religion of moderation and tolerance”).

İhsanoğlu attached importance to increasing the role and effectiveness of the OIC in solving problems and contributing to progress and cooperation among the OIC Member States in various areas of development, including science and technology, transport and communications, tourism, and fostering trade among the Member States, with particular attention to the least developed countries (LDCs) among them.

The achievements realized during his tenure in the field of economic and commercial cooperation is of particular significance. First, he had assigned priority to the entry into force of the cooperation agreements and the statutes of some institutions in the field of economy and trade, pending for signing and ratification. As a result, a number of agreements and statutes which would govern the OIC's ‘Trade Preferential System’, entered into force after completion of the necessary number of ratifying countries. The OIC aims to increase the level of intra-OIC trade up to 20 percent of the OIC total. He has also initiated the OIC cotton programme. to help develop economies of, in particular, the West African Member States of the OIC. A similar program in the domain of tourism was also developed which secured active participation of the OIC Member States. He gave importance to transport projects, such as the ‘Dakar-Port Sudan Railway Project’, the ‘Dushanbe - Mazari Sharif - Herat Railway link’, etc.

At the same time he made efforts to enhance the OIC activity in conflict resolution and peace-building in its Member States and in the world. In view of stopping the sectarian conflicts in Iraq he initiated and coordinated the signing of a ‘Makkah Al-Mukarramah Declaration on the Iraqi Situation’ by Iraqi scholars of Sunni and Shia traditions with a view to interdict and outlaw sectarian killing in Iraq, and declaring such practices as crimes, prohibited and proscribed by Islam (2006). Based on another initiative of İhsanoğlu towards reinforcing mutual understanding between schools of thought and belief, the Islamic Fiqh Academy elaborated a practical plan to deepen the dialogue between the Islamic schools of thought (2008) which would lead to series of meetings of scholars (“ulema”) from the Member States.

As İhsanoğlu assumed the office on 1 January 2005, he immediately launched an emergency appeal to the OIC Member States to provide the victims of the destructive earthquake and the following tsunami that hit South and South Asia on 26 December 2004 with humanitarian aid. He also took necessary measures to coordinate and channel the relief efforts. In view of the huge scale of such disasters and the resulting severe humanitarian crisis situation which go well beyond the capabilities of the affected countries, İhsanoğlu focused on establishing a unit within the OIC General Secretariat to coordinate relief efforts. As a result, the Humanitarian Affairs Department (ICHAD) was created in 2008. It has been formally coordinating and channeling the successful humanitarian assistance programs under the OIC umbrella, including the programs in Indonesia-Banda Aceh, Niger, Sudan-Darfur, Afghanistan, Yemen, Gaza and Pakistan. In Pakistan, Prof. İhsanoğlu inaugurated the construction of 100 housing units in a village in the Punjab province, being the first phase of a project totaling 600 housing units funded by the OIC in six provinces in the country on 11 January 2011.

İhsanoğlu also gave importance to enhancing the role of the OIC in treatment of global issues. He initiated schemes of action with regard to promotion of understanding, tolerance, principles of human rights, democracy, and establishment of dialogue between the OIC's Member States and with other countries and communities of the world. These strategies address north–south/East-West relations with a problem-solving approach aiming to promote proper mutual understanding among the different faiths and cultures. Another main objective of İhsanoğlu was to develop cooperation between the OIC and other international organizations; in the first place, the UN. During the period of the United Nations General Assembly Meetings in September 2010, UN Secretary-General Ban Ki-moon for the first time referred to the OIC as “a strategic and crucial partner of the United Nations” and said that it "plays a significant role in helping to resolve a wide range of issues facing the world community." During İhsanoğlu's tenure the OIC also initiated cooperation in the field of health with the WHO, the Global Fund and the US Government. Furthermore, for the first time OIC Ministerial Conferences were held on health (twice), women (three times), children (twice, in cooperation with UNESCO). Furthermore, he ensured the organization for the first time of NGO Forums within the OIC system.

The OIC's expanded vision and larger sphere of influence during İhsanoğlu's term are reflected among others, in the Russian Federation's applying for and admission as an Observer State with the OIC (2005) and the US President's appointing a Special Envoy to the OIC (2008).

In 2009, on the election of President Obama, he published an open letter in the International Herald Tribune and New York Times, congratulating him and referring to his statement during presidential campaign to develop good relations with the Muslim World with emphasis on İhsanoğlu's conception and norms of moderation and modernization. He quoted Obama saying "Our stories are singular but our destiny is shared".

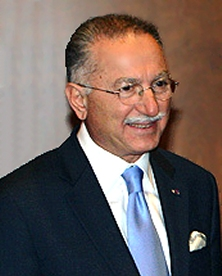
İhsanoğlu in 2009.

- His lectures at universities in Europe and the US, including Padua University (Italy), Oxford University (UK), Columbia University, Georgetown University and New York University (USA). His lecture delivered on 29 January 2007 at the Institut Français des Relations Internationales (IFRI), titled “Is Islam an Intruder to Europe?” touched on the numerous positive interactions between Europe and Muslims over the centuries which helped develop sciences and values in all fields. He delivered a speech at School of International and Public Affairs, Columbia University on 18 September 2008 on the subject of “The OIC’s new Charter, and its new visions and objectives, as well as its increasing role in international conflict resolution and prevention”. On 25 September 2008 he delivered a speech at the Centre for Dialogues, Islamic World-U.S.-The West of New York University, on relations between Islam and Europe. He gave a lecture, on 21 May 2009, at the University of Damascus, titled "The Organization of the Islamic Conference and 21st Century Challenges”. He addressed the issue of the Islamic action at present and in future in a lecture titled “The Future of Islamic Action” delivered at the Cairo Book Fair on 7 February 2010. He delivered a speech at the 1037th Wilton Park Conference focusing on Science Diplomacy on 24 June 2010, and a lecture on “Building Bridges: Intercultural Dialogue Identities and Migration” at the Assembly Hall of the United Nations in Geneva on 16 September 2010.
- his addresses and statements in forums of dialogue, such as the international conference on the Role of Education for Intercultural Understanding and Dialogue which was inaugurated on 21 October 2008 in Copenhagen and co-organized by the Danish Centre for Culture and Dialogue, Danish Ministry of Foreign Affairs, UNESCO, the OIC General Secretariat, ISESCO, ALECSO, UN Alliance of Civilizations Secretariat, Anna Lindh Foundation and Council of Europe; and at the Ministerial Segment of the Third Annual Forum of the Alliance of Civilizations held in Rio de Janeiro on May 28–29, 2010.
- his addresses at international bodies: the UN General Assembly (New York), sessions of the UN Human Rights Council, the Parliamentary Assembly of the Council of Europe (Strasbourg) and the Organization for Security and Co-operation in Europe )OSCE) Permanent Council, among others. He gave special importance to promoting relations with European intergovernmental organisations: the European Union, the OSCE, the Council of Europe and others, and opened with them lines of communications, particularly in fields of mutual interest.
- his collaborative efforts; he initiated and supported the OIC's participation at the British Council project “Our Shared Europe”;
- at the initiative of the OIC General Secretariat, Wilton Park Conference was held in London on 2 May 2006 on the theme of "Challenging Stereotypes in Europe and the Islamic World: Working Together for Constructive Policies and Partnerships" that brought together senior policy-makers from Europe and OIC Member States, officials from the UN, EU and OSCE and the Council of Europe with representatives of Muslim communities, academics and experts to seek to open a new era of political dialogue between Western governments and their Muslim counterparts by focusing on the role of the media in promoting dialogue between the West and the East.

== Publications ==
İhsanoğlu has books, articles and papers in different languages on science, history of science, relations between the Muslim world and the Western world, some of which are as follows:

- Author, The Ottoman Scientific Heritage (Al-Furqan Foundation, 2023; translated to English by Maryam Patton), Ottoman Scientific Heritage (Al-Furqan Foundation, 2021; translated to Arabic by Majda Makhlouf), both of which are translations of the Turkish original, Osmanlı Bilim Mirası (Yapı Kredi Yayınları, 2017)
- Author, Studies on Ottoman Science and Culture, Routledge Variorum Collected Studies, 2020
- Author, The House of Sciences, Oxford University Press, 2019
- Author, co-author and editor, 18 volumes of bio-bibliographies in the series of History of Ottoman Scientific Literature: Astronomy, Mathematics, Geography, Music, Military Arts, Natural and Applied Sciences, Medical Sciences, Astrology, and the classification of sciences.
- Editor and co-author, History of the Ottoman State and Civilization (published in Turkish, English, Arabic, Bosnian, Russian, Albanian and Persian).
- Author, Science, Technology and Learning in the Ottoman Empire, Ashgate, Variorum, 2004
- Editor, The Art of Calligraphy in Islamic Heritage (published in English, Turkish, Arabic, Malay, Japanese);
- Editor, Cultural Contributions in building A Universal Civilisation: Islamic Contributions, IRCICA, Istanbul, 2005;
- Editor and co-author, UNESCO: The Different Aspects of Islamic Culture, Vol. 5: Culture and Learning in Islam, UNESCO, 2003.
- Author, The Turks in Egypt and Their Cultural Heritage, (published in Turkish, Arabic, English).
- Author, The Islamic World in the New Century: The Organization of the Islamic Conference, 1969–2009, 2010 (published in English, Arabic, Turkish, Russian, Bengali and Urdu)
- Author, Darulfünun. The Focus of Ottoman Cultural Modernization, 2010, 2 v., (in Turkish)

Membership in editorial boards:

- Editor-in-Chief of IRCICA Newsletter, 1980–2004;
- Journal of Qur’anic Studies, SOAS, London, UK;
- Journal of Islamic Studies (Oxford Centre for Islamic Studies) UK;
- Arts and the Islamic World, London, UK;
- Archivum Ottomanicum, Harrassowitz Verlag, Wiesbaden, Germany;
- Bulletin of the Royal Institute for Inter-Faith Studies, Jordan;
- Journal for the History of the Exact and Natural Sciences in Islamic Civilization, Barcelona, Spain;
- Contributions to Oriental Philology, Sarajevo, Bosnia and Herzegovina;
- Advisory Board member of Studies in History of Medicine and Science, Hamdard University, India

== Awards and medals ==
- Kuwait Foundation For The Advancement of Sciences (KFAS), Golden medal and KFAS shield Award for Arabic and Islamic Scientific Heritage, 2021
- 2015 Peace Award (Ducci Foundation, Rome, Italy), 25 March 2015.
- Dr. Ibrahim Rugova's Golden Medal of Peace, Democracy and Humanism, Republic of Kosovo, given by President Atifete Jahjaga on 1 May 2013
- "Bangladesh Friendship Medal", highest civilian honor of Bangladesh, conferred by the Prime Minister of Bangladesh Sheikh Hasina, 6 May 2013
- "Honorary Order of the Yellow Star", highest civilian honor of Suriname, conferred by the Acting President of Suriname Robert L. A. Ameerali, 27 May 2013
- "Order of the Nile ” from the President of Arab Republic of Egypt, Mohamed Morsi, 2013.
- International Peace Award 2011-2012 by Beirut-based International Human Rights Commission's (IHRC) World Chairman and Ambassador at Large Dr. Muhammad Shahid Amin Khan, 23 June 2012
- “Al-Idrisi Award” by President Raffaele Lombardo in Palermo, Italy, 15 May 2012
- Grand Commandeur Medal by the President of the Republic Gabon, Haj Ali Bongo Odimba, 20 April 2012
- Medal "27 June First Class” by Ismaïl Omar Guelleh, President of the Republic of Djibouti on 5 December 2010.
- Order of Ismoili Somoni, given by the President of the Republic of Tajikistan, President Emomali Rahmon, 18 May 2010
- Medal "Crescent of Pakistan” by Asif Ali Zardari, President of the Islamic Republic of Pakistan, 23 March 2010
- Honorary Commander of the Order of Loyalty to the Crown of Malaysia (P.S.M.) (2009)
- Alexandre Koyré Medal conferred by the International Academy of the History of Science, Paris, December 2008
- "Building Bridges Award 2007" by the Association of Muslim Social Scientists (AMSS) based in UK, April 2008.
- "South-South Cooperation Award for Innovation" by UNDP, December 2007
- "Polio Eradication Champion Award" by the Rotary International, June 2007
- “Commandeur de l’Ordre National du Lion” conferred by the President of the Republic of Senegal, 2006
- "Order of Glory" conferred by the President of the Republic of Azerbaijan, 2006
- "Medal of Glory” conferred by the President of the Republic of the Russian Federation (presented by the President of Tatarstan), 2006
- "Commandeur de l’Ordre National du Mérite” conferred by the President of the Republic of Senegal, 2002
- Iran World Award for Book of the Year, presented by Seyed Mohammad Khatami, President of the Islamic Republic of Iran, 2000
- "State Medal of Distinguished Service" conferred by the President of the Republic of Turkey, March 2000
- "Independence Medal of the First Order" conferred by King Hussein Bin Talal of the Hashemite Kingdom of Jordan, 1996
- "Certificate of Honour and Distinction" by the Organisation of the Islamic Conference, 1995
- Medal of "Distinction of the First Order” from the President of Arab Republic of Egypt in 1990.
- Order of the State of Turkish Republic of Northern Cyprus" by Derviş Eroğlu, President of the Turkish Republic of Northern Cyprus, 22 November 2013.

Diplomatic posts
Preceded by Abdelouahed Belkeziz	Secretary-General of the Organisation of Islamic Cooperation; 2004–2014	Succeeded by Iyad bin Amin Madani
