= Parties contesting the June 2015 Turkish general election =

This is a list of all political parties eligible and intending to contest the Turkish general election of June 2015. Parties wishing to contest were required to send a full list of their candidates to the Supreme Electoral Council of Turkey by 17:00 local time on April 7, 2015. 20 of the 32 eligible parties submitted candidate lists. A full list of all political parties in Turkey is available here.

== Parties eligible ==
On 1 February, the Supreme Electoral Council of Turkey announced that 32 parties fit the criteria in order to field candidates in the general election. In order to be eligible, parties need to have formed local organisations at least six months before the election and have completed their party congresses by the election. Furthermore, they need local party offices in at least half of the 81 Provinces of Turkey. The eligible parties who are intending to contest the election by fielding partisan candidates are listed as follows.

Party		Leader
ANAPAR	Anatolia Party	Emine Ülker Tarhan
MEP	Centre Party	Abdurrahim Karslı
KP	Communist Party	Özlem Şen Abay
MYP	Conservative Ascension Party	Ahmet Reyiz Yılmaz
DP	Democrat Party	Gültekin Uysal
DSP	Democratic Left Party	Masum Türker
DGP	Democratic Progress Party	İdris Bal
SP	Felicity Party	Mustafa Kamalak
İLK	First Party	Eran Tapan
HÜDA-PAR	Free Cause Party	Zekeriya Yapıcıoğlu
ÖDP	Freedom and Solidarity Party	Alper Taş
BBP	Great Union Party	Mustafa Destici
YURT-P	Homeland Party	Sadettin Tantan
BTP	Independent Turkey Party	Haydar Baş
AKP	Justice and Development Party	Ahmet Davutoğlu
EMEP	Labour Party	Selma Gürkan
LDP	Liberal Democrat Party	Cem Toker
MP	Nation Party	Aykut Edibali
MİLAD	Nation and Justice Party	Mehmet Bozdemir
MHP	Nationalist Movement Party	Devlet Bahçeli
VP	Patriotic Party	Doğu Perinçek
HYP	People's Ascent Party	Ragıp Önder Günay
HTKP	People's Communist Party of Turkey	Umut Kuruç
HKP	People's Liberation Party	Nurullah Ankut
HDP	Peoples' Democratic Party	Selahattin Demirtaş
CHP	Republican People's Party	Kemal Kılıçdaroğlu
HEPAR	Rights and Equality Party	Osman Pamukoğlu
HAK-PAR	Rights and Freedoms Party	Fehmi Demir
HAP	Rights and Justice Party	Yiğit Zeki Öztürk
TURK-P	Social Reconciliation Reform and Development Party	Ahmet Eyüp Özgüç
DYP	True Path Party	Çetin Özaçıkgöz
GP	Young Party	Cem Uzan

== Parties fielding candidates ==
Parties that intended to contest the election were required to hand their candidate lists to the Supreme Electoral Council of Turkey (YSK) by 5pm local time on 7 April. 20 parties presented candidate lists before the deadline, while another, the First Party, was delayed by 22 minutes due to a traffic accident. The parties are listed below according to their position on the ballot paper.

The number of electoral districts in which the party is fielding candidates is shown in brackets after the party's name.

Ballot #	Party		Leader	Position	Ideology	Districts contested
1	DYP	True Path Party	Çetin Özaçıkgöz	Centre right	Economic liberalism	56
2	ANAPAR	Anatolia Party	Emine Ülker Tarhan	Centre left	Kemalism	85
3	HAK-PAR	Rights and Freedoms Party	Fehmi Fırat	Left wing	Kurdish nationalism	75
4	KP	Communist Party	Özlem Şen Abay	Far left	Communism	85
5	MP	Nation Party	Aykut Edibali	Centre right	Turkish nationalism	85
6	HAP	Rights and Justice Party	Yiğit Zeki Öztürk	Centre	Social Justice	43
7	MEP	Centre Party	Abdurrahim Karslı	Centre	Centrism	73
8	TURK-P	Social Reconciliation Reform and Development Party	Ahmet Eyüp Özgüç	Centre	Centrism	55
9	HKP	People's Liberation Party	Nurullah Ankut	Left wing	Communism	85
10	LDP	Liberal Democrat Party	Cem Toker	Centre right	Liberalism	58
11	MHP	Nationalist Movement Party	Devlet Bahçeli	Right wing	Turkish nationalism	85
12	HDP	Peoples' Democratic Party	Selahattin Demirtaş	Left wing	Democratic socialism	85
13	SP	Felicity Party (National Alliance with the BBP)	Mustafa Kamalak	Far right	Islamism	85
14	CHP	Republican People's Party	Kemal Kılıçdaroğlu	Centre left	Social democracy	85
15	AKP	Justice and Development Party	Ahmet Davutoğlu	Right wing	Conservative democracy	85
16	DSP	Democratic Left Party	Masum Türker	Centre left	Social democracy	85
17	YURT-P	Homeland Party	Saadettin Tantan	Centre right	Turkish nationalism	56
18	DP	Democrat Party	Gültekin Uysal	Centre right	Economic liberalism	85
19	VP	Patriotic Party	Doğu Perinçek	Left wing	Left-wing nationalism	85
20	BTP	Independent Turkey Party	Haydar Baş	Centre	Kemalism	85

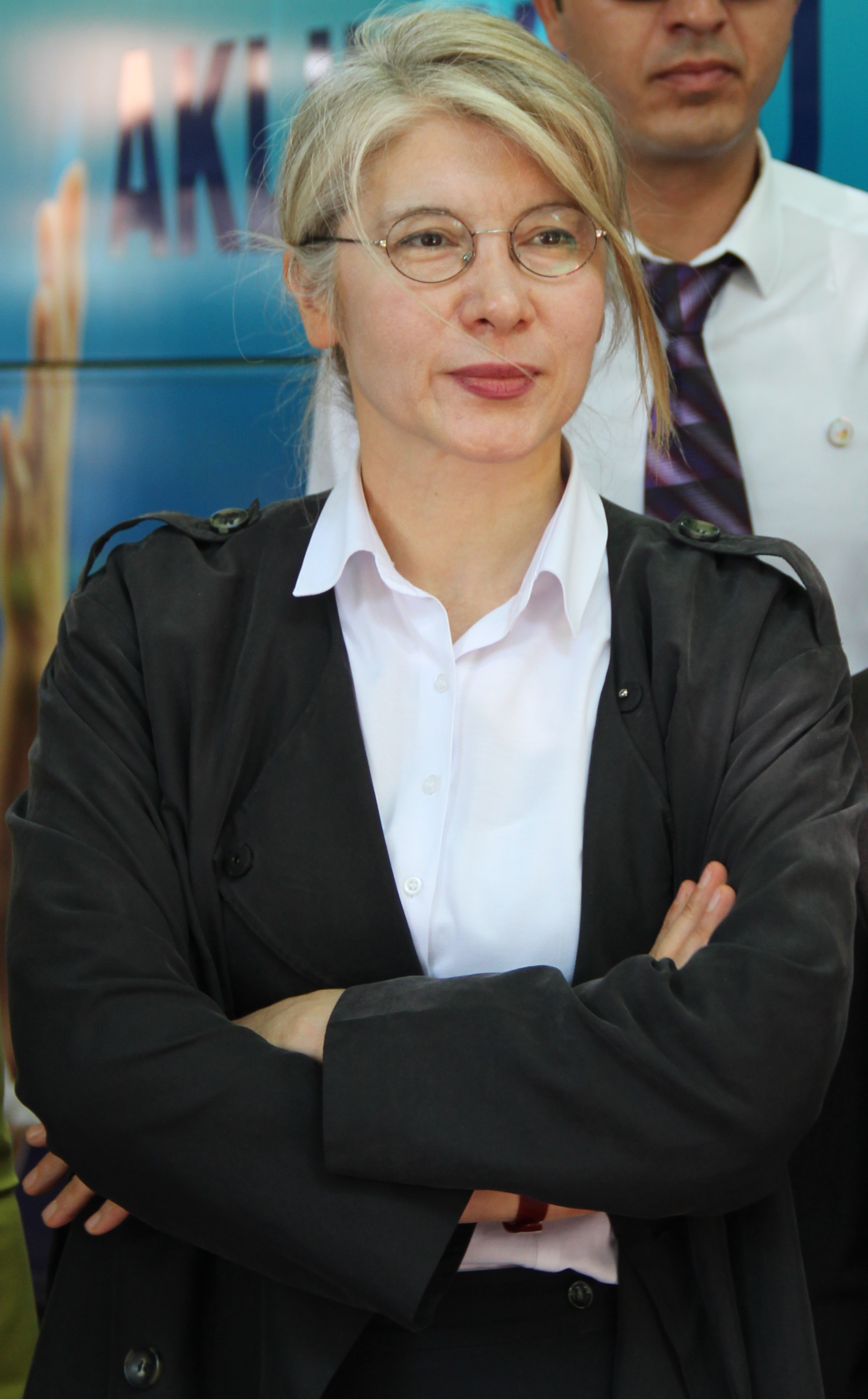
Emine Ülker Tarhan, leader of the Anatolia Party (ANAPAR)

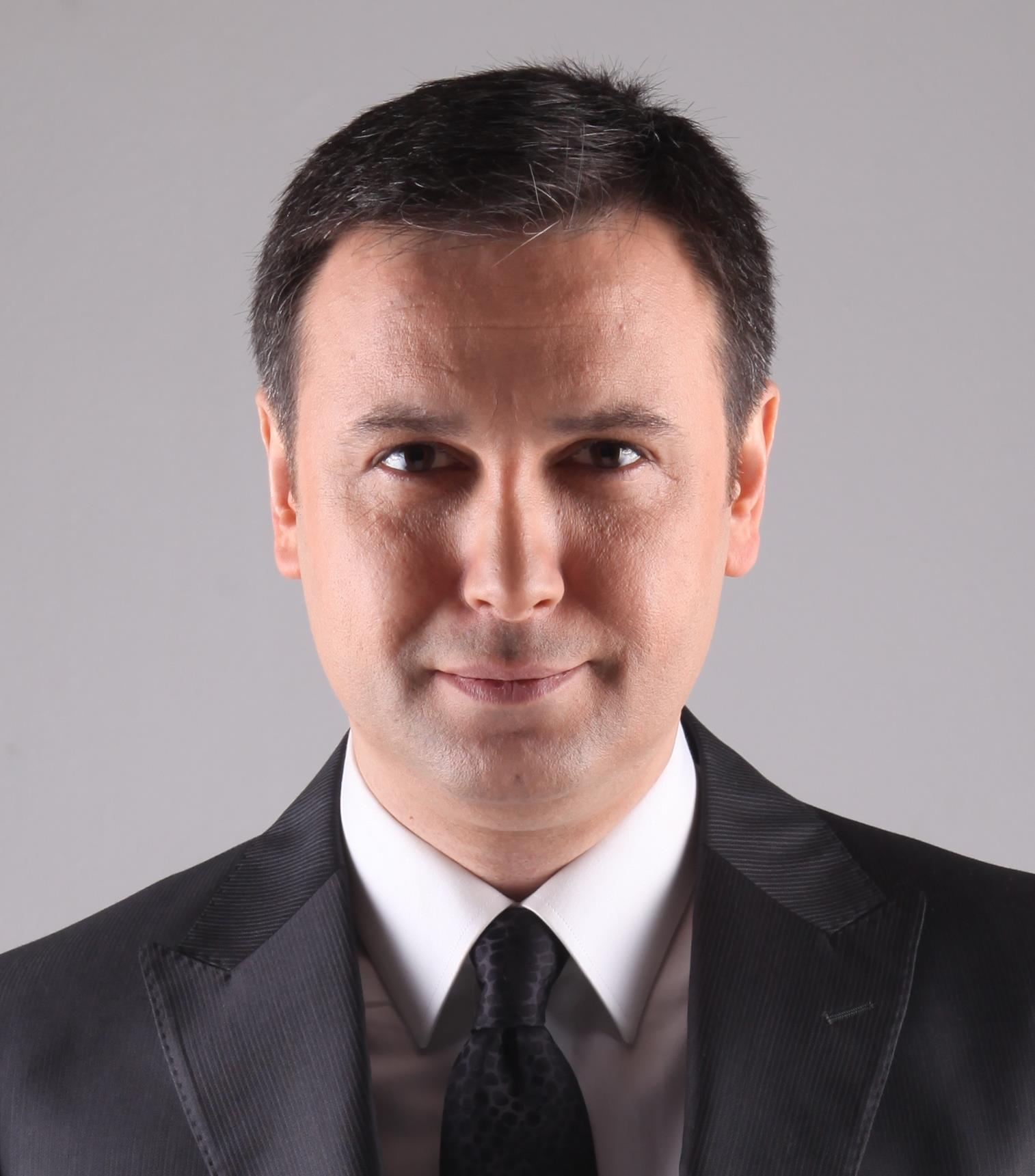
Ahmet Eyüp Özgüç, leader of the Social Reconciliation Reform and Development Party (TURK-P)

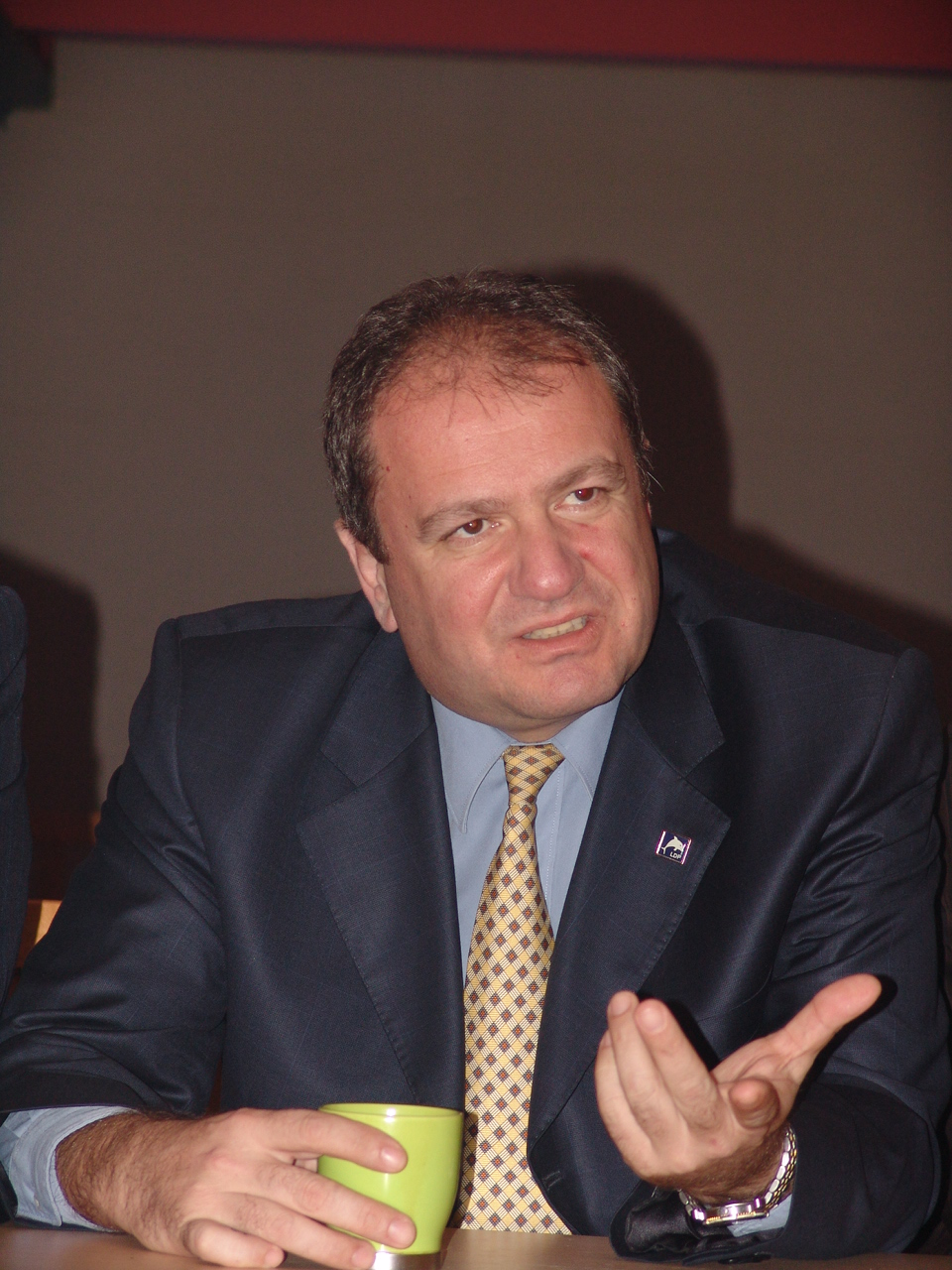
Cem Toker, leader of the Liberal Democrat Party (LDP)

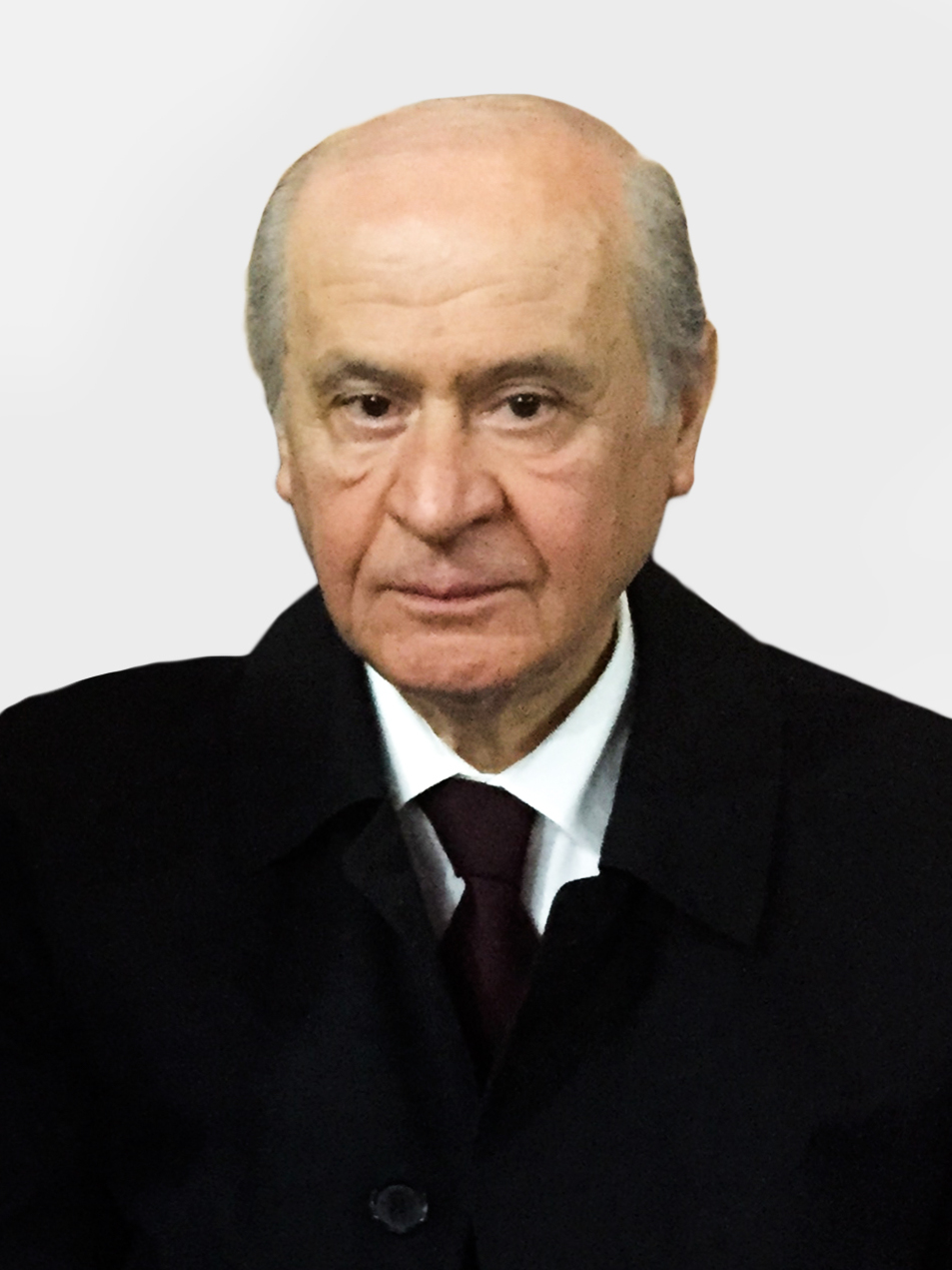
Devlet Bahçeli, leader of the Nationalist Movement Party (MHP)

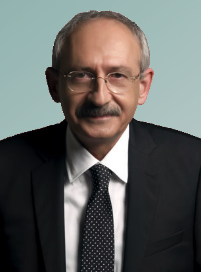
Kemal Kılıçdaroğlu, leader of the Republican People's Party (CHP)

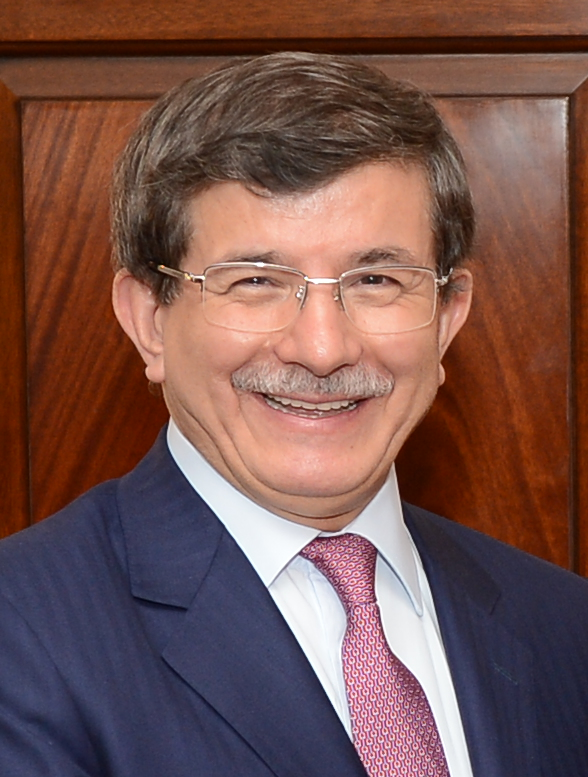
Ahmet Davutoğlu, leader of the Justice and Development Party (AKP)

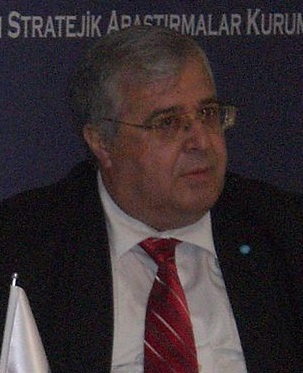
Masum Türker, leader of the Democratic Left Party (DSP)

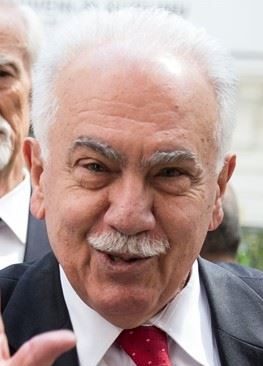
Doğu Perinçek, leader of the Patriotic Party (VP)

== Parties contesting as independents ==
Since the parliamentary threshold of 10% does not apply to independent candidates, parties who poll significantly below the threshold may contest the election by fielding their candidates as independents in order to increase their chances of getting elected. This was a tactic employed by Kurdish nationalist parties during the 2007 and 2011 election. In the latter, the Peace and Democracy Party candidates won 5.67% of the vote and 35 were elected since they contested the election as independents and rejoined the BDP shortly after taking their seats.

The following parties have expressed intention of fielding independent candidates for the election.

Party		Leader
HEPAR	Rights and Equality Party	Osman Pamukoğlu
HÜDA-PAR	Free Cause Party	Zekeriya Yapıcıoğlu

== Electoral alliances ==
The following electoral alliances were made between parties in the run-up to the election.

- The Labour Party (EMEP) announced support for the Peoples' Democratic Party (HDP) and did not contest the election.
- The Great Union Party (BBP) and the Felicity Party (SP) announced that they would contest the election as a joint alliance under the name National Alliance (Millî İttifak). The Nation and Justice Party (MİLAD) planned to join the SP and BBP, but it did not actualise. The candidate lists were drawn up such that BBP candidates were placed top in electoral districts in which they won more votes than the SP in 2011, while SP candidates were placed top in provinces in which the SP had beaten the BBP in 2011. This meant that an SP candidate was placed first in 55 provinces, while a BBP candidate was placed first in 30. The remaining positions subsequently alternated between SP and BBP candidates.
- Two minor parties, namely the Revolutionary People's Party (DHP) and Socialist Workers' Party of Turkey (TSİP) backed the Republican People's Party (CHP).
- The Conservative Ascension Party (MYP) announced support for the Nationalist Movement Party (MHP).

The True Path Party (DYP) expressed its intention to form an alliance with six other parties in order to overcome the 10% election threshold. The party's leader Çetin Özaçıkgöz met with the leaders of the Centre Party, Rights and Equality Party (HEPAR) and the Great Union Party (BBP). In the end, no alliance was formed.
