= List of political parties in Turkey =

Turkey is a presidential republic with a multi-party system. Major parties are defined as political parties that received more than 7% of the votes in the latest general election and/or represented in parliament. Minor parties are defined as political parties that have fulfilled the requirements of the Supreme Election Council (Yüksek Seçim Kurulu in Turkish, abbreviated as YSK) and don't have any representatives in the parliament. Forming a political party without prior permission is a constitutional right, but the Interior Ministry may delay registering a new party for years, so the party cannot stand in elections.

If the ID and serial number of a person's Turkish identity card is known, anyone can query their political party membership via the website of the General Prosecution Office of the Supreme Court of Appeal or mobile phone messages.

== Political parties represented in the Turkish Parliament ==
General information about the parties holding seats in the Grand National Assembly as of June 2023:

Party		Leader	Position	Ideology	MPs	Metro. Mun.	Provinces	Districts	Provincial councillors	Municipal Assemb.
AK PARTİ	Justice and Development Party; Adalet ve Kalkınma Partisi	Recep Tayyip Erdoğan	Right-wing	National conservatism; Neo-Ottomanism	280 / 600	13 / 30	12 / 51	389 / 973	592 / 1,282	8,178 / 20,952
YENİ PARTİ	New Party; Yeni Parti	Özgür Özel	Centre-left	Kemalism; Social democracy	91 / 600	2 / 30	5 / 51	13 / 973	0 / 1,282	28 / 20,952
DEM PARTİ	Peoples' Equality and Democracy Party; Halkların Eşitlik ve Demokrasi Partisi	Tülay Hatimoğulları; Tuncer Bakırhan	Centre-left to left-wing	Turkeyification; Regionalism; Minority rights	56 / 600	1 / 30	3 / 51	49 / 973	132 / 1,282	1,410 / 20,952
MHP	Nationalist Movement Party; Milliyetçi Hareket Partisi	Devlet Bahçeli	Far-right	Ultranationalism; Neo-fascism	46 / 600	0 / 30	8 / 51	112 / 973	207 / 1,282	2,715 / 20,952
CHP	Republican People's Party; Cumhuriyet Halk Partisi	Kemal Kılıçdaroğlu	Centre-left	Kemalism; Social democracy	44 / 600	11 / 30	16 / 51	287 / 973	300 / 1,282	6,551 / 20,952
İYİ PARTİ	Good Party; İYİ Parti	Müsavat Dervişoğlu	Centre-right to right-wing	Kemalism; National conservatism	27 / 600	0 / 30	1 / 51	12 / 973	14 / 1,282	476 / 20,952
DEVA PARTİSİ	Democracy and Progress Party; Demokrasi ve Atılım Partisi	Ali Babacan	Centre-right	Liberal conservatism; Pro-Europeanism	10 / 600	0 / 30	0 / 51	1 / 973	1 / 1,282	40 / 20,952
SAADET	Felicity Party; Saadet Partisi	Mahmut Arıkan	Right-wing	National Outlook; Islamism	20 / 600	0 / 30	0 / 51	1 / 973	0 / 1,272	72 / 20,952
HÜDA PAR	Free Cause Party; Hür Dava Partisi	Zekeriya Yapıcıoğlu	Far-right	Islamic fundamentalism; Minority rights	4 / 600	0 / 30	0 / 51	0 / 973	0 / 1,282	23 / 20,952
YENİDEN REFAH	New Welfare Party; Yeniden Refah Partisi	Fatih Erbakan	Far-right	National Outlook; Islamism	4 / 600	0 / 30	1 / 51	17 / 973	21 / 1,282	1,004 / 20,952
TİP	Workers' Party of Turkey; Türkiye İşçi Partisi	Erkan Baş	Left-wing to far-left	Communism; Marxism-Leninism	3 / 600	0 / 30	0 / 51	2 / 973	1 / 1,282	36 / 20,952
DBP	Democratic Regions Party; Demokratik Bölgeler Partisi	Çiğdem Kılıçgün Uçar; Keskin Bayındır	Left-wing	Regionalism; Minority rights	2 / 600	0 / 30	0 / 51	0 / 973	0 / 1,282	0 / 20,952
EMEP	Labour Party; Emek Partisi	Seyit Aslan	Far-left	Communism; Marxism–Leninism	2 / 600	0 / 30	0 / 51	0 / 973	0 / 1,282	11 / 20,952
DP	Democrat Party; Demokrat Parti	Gültekin Uysal	Centre-right	Liberal conservatism; Pro-Europeanism	1 / 600	0 / 30	0 / 51	1 / 973	0 / 1,282	55 / 20,952
DSP	Democratic Left Party; Demokratik Sol Parti	Önder Aksakal	Centre-left	Ecevitism; Social democracy	1 / 600	0 / 30	0 / 51	1 / 973	0 / 1,282	28 / 20,952

== Other political parties ==
Other parties eligible to contest in elections (by March 2023)

Party		Leader	Position	Ideology	MPs	Metro. Mun.	Provinces	Districts	Provincial council.	Municipal Assemb.
AB PARTİ	Justice Unity Party; Adalet Birlik Partisi	İrfan Uzun	Centre-left	Environmentalism; Kemalism; Secularism; Turkish nationalism	0 / 600	0 / 30	0 / 51	0 / 973	0 / 1,282	0 / 20,952
AP	Justice Party; Adalet Partisi	Vecdet Öz	Centre-right	Liberal conservatism Kemalism	0 / 600	0 / 30	0 / 51	0 / 973	0 / 1,282	0 / 20,952
ANAP	Motherland Party; Anavatan Partisi	İbrahim Çelebi	Centre-right	Liberal conservatism	0 / 600	0 / 30	0 / 51	0 / 973	0 / 1,282	6 / 20,952
BTP	Independent Turkey Party; Bağımsız Türkiye Partisi	Hüseyin Baş	Radical centre	Civic nationalism Kemalism	0 / 600	0 / 30	0 / 51	0 / 973	0 / 1,282	1 / 20,952
BBP	Great Unity Party; Büyük Birlik Partisi	Mustafa Destici	Far-right	Turkish Islamonationalism	0 / 600	0 / 30	1 / 51	14 / 973	11 / 1,282	261 / 20,952
GELECEK; PARTİSİ	Future Party; Gelecek Partisi	Ahmet Davutoğlu	Centre-right to right-wing	Conservatism; Pro-Europeanism	0 / 600	0 / 30	0 / 51	0 / 973	0 / 1,282	11 / 20,952
GENÇPARTİ	Young Party; Genç Parti	Burçin Şahindur		Economic liberalism Populism	0 / 600	0 / 30	0 / 51	0 / 973	0 / 1,282	0 / 20,952
HAK-PAR	Rights and Freedoms Party; Hak ve Özgürlükler Partisi	Düzgün Kaplan		Kurdish nationalism Federalism	0 / 600	0 / 30	0 / 51	0 / 973	0 / 1,282	0 / 20,952
HKP	People's Liberation Party; Halkın Kurtuluş Partisi	Nurullah Ankut	Far-left	Communism; Left-wing nationalism	0 / 600	0 / 30	0 / 51	0 / 973	0 / 1,282	0 / 20,952
MEMLEKET	Homeland Party; Memleket Partisi	Muharrem İnce	Centre	Kemalism; Pro-Europeanism	0 / 600	0 / 30	0 / 51	0 / 973	0 / 1,282	10 / 20,952
MİLLET	Nation Party; Millet Partisi	Cuma Nacar	Right-wing	National conservatism Turkish nationalism	0 / 600	0 / 30	0 / 51	0 / 973	0 / 1,282	0 / 20,952
MYP	National Path Party; Milli Yol Partisi	Remzi Çayır	Far-right	Turkish-Islamic nationalism Social conservatism	0 / 600	0 / 30	0 / 51	0 / 973	0 / 1,282	1 / 20,952
SOL PARTİ	Left Party; SOL Parti	Önder İşleyen	Left-wing to far-left	Socialism; Left-wing populism	0 / 600	0 / 30	0 / 51	1 / 973	0 / 1,282	5 / 20,952
TKH	Communist Movement of Turkey; Türkiye Komünist Hareketi	Aysel Tekerek	Far-left	Communism; Marxism–Leninism	0 / 600	0 / 30	0 / 51	0 / 973	0 / 1,282	0 / 20,952
TKP	Communist Party of Turkey; Türkiye Komünist Partisi	Kemal Okuyan	Far-left	Communism; Marxism–Leninism	0 / 600	0 / 30	0 / 51	0 / 973	0 / 1,282	9 / 20,952
VATAN; PARTİSİ	Patriotic Party; Vatan Partisi	Doğu Perinçek	Far-left	Ulusalism; Eurasianism	0 / 600	0 / 30	0 / 51	0 / 973	0 / 1,282	0 / 20,952
YTP	New Turkey Party; Yeni Türkiye Partisi	Engin Yılmaz	Right-wing	Social conservatism Right-wing populism	0 / 600	0 / 30	0 / 51	0 / 973	0 / 1,282	0 / 20,952
ZAFER; PARTİSİ	Victory Party; Zafer Partisi	Ümit Özdağ	Far-right	Ultranationalism; Anti-immigration	0 / 600	0 / 30	0 / 51	1 / 973	0 / 1,282	0 / 20,952
A PARTİ	Key Party; Anahtar Parti	Yavuz Ağıralioğlu	Right-wing to far-right	National conservatism Turkish nationalism	0 / 600	0 / 30	0 / 51	0 / 973	0 / 1,282	0 / 20,952

General information on other political parties registered in the Ministry of Interior:

Abbr.	Party Name	Turkish name	Leader(s)	Position	Ideology	Date of foundation
TSİP	Socialist Workers' Party of Turkey	Türkiye Sosyalist İşçi Partisi	Turgut Koçak	Far-left	Communism, Anti-revisionism	1993
LDP	Liberal Democratic Party	Liberal Demokrat Parti	Gültekin Tırpancı	Centre	Classical liberalism	1994
DSİP	Revolutionary Socialist Workers' Party	Devrimci Sosyalist İşçi Partisi	Tuna Emren, Şenol Karakaş	Far-left	Trotskyism	1997
YURT-P	Homeland Party	Yurt Partisi	Sadettin Tantan	Centre-right	Conservatism	2002
DYP	True Path Party	Doğru Yol Partisi	Cenk Küpeli	Centre-right	Liberal conservatism	2007
DİP	Revolutionary Workers' Party	Devrimci İşçi Partisi	Ömer Sungur Savran	Far-left	Trotskyism	2007
ULUSAL	National Party	Ulusal Parti	Gökçe Fırat Çulhaoğlu	Far-left	Nationalism	2010
1920 TKP	Socialist Liberation Party	Toplumcu Kurtuluş Partisi	İsmail Kaplan	Far-left	Communism, Marxism–Leninism	2012
YSP	Green Left Party	Yeşil Sol Parti	Eylem Tuncaelli, Naci Sönmez	Left-wing	Green politics	2012
TURAN	Turan Movement Party	Turan Hareketi Partisi	Varol Esen	Far-right	Nationalism, Turanism	2014
MMP	National Struggle Party	Milli Mücadele Partisi	Ahmet Kaya		Nationalism; Kemalism	2014
KP	Women's Party	Kadın Partisi	Fatma Benal Yazgan		Feminism	2014
MEP	Centre Party	Merkez Parti	Pelin Gündeş Bakır	Centre to centre-right	Liberal	2014
DEZA-PAR	Democracy Time Party	Demokrasi Zamanı Partisi	İlhami Çağrıtekin		Zaza nationalism	2016
OSMANLI	Ottoman Party	Osmanlı Partisi	Habip Geleş	Far-right	Neo-Ottomanism; Turkish nationalism	2016
ÖTÜKEN	Otuken Union Party	Ötüken Birliği Partisi	Çağatay Korkut Körüklü	Far-right	Nationalism, Pan-Turkism	2017
HÜRRİYET	Liberty Party	Hürriyet Partisi	Ali Gül	Centre	Liberalism, Egalitarianism, Anti-corruption	2025

== Former ==
=== Inactive parties ===
The following parties are inactive, and they are not listed in the active political parties list by the Supreme Court of Appeal.

Party Name	Turkish name	Abbr.	Ideology	Position
Democracy Party of Turkey & Kurdistan	Türkiye Kürdistan Demokrasi Partisi	T-KDP	Kurdish nationalism	Big tent
Alternative and Change Party	Alternatif ve Değişim Partisi	AL PARTİ	Conservative	Right-wing
Nation and Justice Party	Millet ve Adalet Partisi	MİLAD		
People's Ascent Party	Halkın Yükselişi Partisi	HYP	Social democracy	Centre-left
Turkey's Change Movement	Türkiye Değişim Hareketi	TDH	Social democracy	Centre-left
Social Reconciliation Reform and Development Party	Toplumsal Uzlaşma Reform ve Kalkınma Partisi	TURK-P	Nationalism	
Independent Republican Party	Bağımsız Cumhuriyet Partisi	BCP	Nationalism	
Electronic Democracy Party	Elektronik Demokrasi Partisi	e-Parti	Liberal	Single-issue

=== Defunct and historical parties ===
These are some of the parties that were dismantled because of their internal dynamics, mergers, inability to find electoral base or through governmental intervention, for instance following the Turkish coups d'état.

Defunct and historical parties
Party Name	Position	Notes
Alternative Party (Alternatif Parti)	Right-wing	Conservative
Peoples' Democratic Party (Halkların Demokratik Partisi)	Centre-left to left-wing	dissolved in 2023
Participatory Democracy Party (Katılımcı Demokrasi Partisi)	Centre-left	dissolved in 2019
Anatolia Party (Anadolu Partisi)	Centre-left	dissolved in 2015
Democratic Left People's Party (Demokratik Sol Halk Partisi)	Centre-left	dissolved in 2010
New Turkey Party (2002) (Yeni Türkiye Partisi)	Centre-left	joined CHP in 2004
Social Democracy Party (SODEP) (Sosyal Demokrat Parti)	Centre-left	merged with People's Party to form Social Democratic Populist Party (SHP) in 1985
People's Party (Halkçı Parti)		merged with SODEP to form Social Democratic Populist Party (SHP) in 1985
Social Democratic Populist Party (Sosyaldemokrat Halkçı Parti)	Centre-left	merged with CHP in 1995
Socialist Democracy Party (Sosyalist Demokrasi Partisi)	Left-wing	merged to Peoples' Democratic Party in 2015
People's Communist Party of Turkey (Halkın Türkiye Komünist Partisi)	Far-left	dissolved in 2017
Republican Villagers Nation Party (Cumhuriyetçi Köylü Millet Partisi)	Nationalist	merger of two parties, replaced by MHP in 1969
Nationalist Task Party (Milliyetçi Çalışma Partisi)	Nationalist	replaced by MHP in 1992
Nationalist Democracy Party (Milliyetçi Demokrasi Partisi)	Nationalist	dissolved 1986
Rights and Equality Party (Hak ve Eşitlik Partisi)	Nationalist, Populist	dissolved 2019
Greens of Turkey (Yeşiller Partisi)	Green politics	merged with EDP to form Greens and the Left Party of the Future (Yeşiller ve Sol Gelecek Partisi) in 2012.
Equality and Democracy Party (Eşitlik ve Demokrasi Partisi)	Green politics	merged with the Greens to form Greens and the Left Party of the Future (Yeşiller ve Sol Gelecek Partisi) in 2012.
Justice Party (Adalet Partisi)	Conservative, right-wing	closed on 12 September 1980
Communist Party (Komünist Parti)	Far-left	Member of United June Movement, Initiative of Communist and Workers' Parties and International Meeting of Communist and Workers' Parties. Founded in 2014, Dissolved in 2017
Democrat Party (Demokrat Parti)	Centre-right	1946-1961
Nation Party (Millet Partisi)	Right-wing	1948–1953 and 1962–1977
New Party (Yeni Parti)		dissolved 2012
Democratic Party (Demokrat Parti)	Centre-right	1970-1980
Democratic Center Party (Demokratik Merkez Partisi)	Right-wing	merged into DYP on September 14, 1991
True Path Party (Doğru Yol Partisi)	Centre-right	merged with Motherland Party into Democrat Party (Turkey, 2007) in 2007
New Turkey Party (1961) (Yeni Türkiye Partisi)	Right-wing	joined to Justice Party in 1973
People's Voice Party (Halkın Sesi Partisi)	Right-wing	dissolved in 2012
Turkey Party (Türkiye Partisi)	Centre-right	dissolved in 2012
Liberal Republican Party (Serbest Cumhuriyet Fırkası)	Centre-right, Liberal	dissolved itself in 1930
Liberty Party (Hürriyet Partisi)	Liberal	joined CHP in 1958
National Salvation Party (Milli Selâmet Partisi)	Sunni Islamist	closed on 12 September 1980
National Development Party (Milli Kalkınma Partisi)	Sunni Islamist	

=== Banned parties ===
These are some of the parties that were banned through extraordinary courts or the Constitutional Court of Turkey.

Banned parties
Party Name	Position	Notes
Fatherland Party (Vatan Partisi)	Left-wing	banned in 1954
Workers Party of Turkey (Türkiye İşçi Partisi)	Far-left	banned in 1971, represented in the national senate in early 1960s. (1961–1987) eventually merged with the Communist Party of Turkey in 1987.
United Communist Party of Turkey (Türkiye Birleşik Komünist Partisi)	Far-left	banned in 1991; ban found contrary to Article 11 (freedom of association) of the European Convention on Human Rights, 1998 (1987–1991)
Labour Party (Emek Partisi)	Far-left	ban found contrary to Article 11 (freedom of association) of the European Convention on Human Rights, 2005, and re-established
Progressive Republican Party (Terakkiperver Cumhuriyet Fırkası)	Conservative	banned on 3 June 1925 (1924–1925)
National Order Party (Milli Nizam Partisi)	Sunni Islamist	banned on 20 May 1971 (1970–1971)
Welfare Party (Refah Partisi)	Sunni Islamist	banned on 16 January 1998; (1983-1998) ban upheld by European Convention on Human Rights 2003
Virtue Party (Fazilet Partisi)	Sunni Islamist	banned on 22 June 2001; (1998-2001) ECHR case withdrawn by applicant 2005
People's Labor Party (Halkın Emek Partisi)	Kurdish nationalist	banned in July 1993 (1990-1993)
Democracy Party (Demokrasi Partisi)	Kurdish nationalist	banned on 16 June 1994; found contrary to Article 11 (freedom of association) of the European Convention on Human Rights, 2002 (1993-1994)
People’s Democracy Party (Halkın Demokrasi Partisi)	Kurdish nationalist	banned on 13 March 2003; found contrary to Article 11 (freedom of association) of the European Convention on Human Rights, 2010 (1994-2003)
Democratic Society Party (Demokratik Toplum Partisi)	Kurdish nationalist	banned on 11 December 2009; ECHR case ongoing (2005-2009)
Great Turkey Party (Büyük Türkiye Partisi)	Turkish nationalist	banned in 1983

=== Political traditions ===
Tradition	Main parties	Refs
Republican People's Party (1922–1981) tradition	Populist Party (1983–1985); Social Democracy Party (1983–1985); Social Democratic Populist Party (1985–1992); Democratic Left Party (1985–present); Republican People's Party (1992–present); New Party (2026–present)	
Democrat Party (1946–1960) tradition	New Turkey Party (1961–1973); Justice Party (1961–1981); Democratic Party (1970–1980); True Path Party (1983–2007); Motherland Party (1983–2009); Democrat Party (2007–present)	
Nation Party (1948–1954)	Turkish Villagers' Party (1952–1958); Republican Nation Party (1954–1958); Republican Villagers Nation Party (1958–1969); Nation Party (1962–1981); Nationalist Movement Party (1969–1981); Conservative Party (1983–1985); Nationalist Task Party (1983–1993); Nationalist Movement Party (1993–present)	
National Order Party (1970–1971) tradition	National Salvation Party (1972–1981); Welfare Party (1983–1998); Virtue Party (1997–2001); Justice and Development Party (2001–present); Felicity Party (2001–present); New Welfare Party (2018–present)	
People's Labour Party (1990–1993) tradition	Freedom and Equality Party (1992); Freedom and Democracy Party (1992–1993); Democracy Party (1993–1994); People's Democracy Party (1994–2003); Democratic People's Party (1997–2005); Democratic Society Party (2005–2009); Peace and Democracy Party (2008–2014); Peoples' Democratic Party (2012–2023); Democratic Regions Party (2014–present); People's Equality and Democracy Party (2023–present)	

== See also ==
- Politics of Turkey
- List of political parties in the Ottoman Empire
- Communist Party of Turkey (disambiguation)
