= 2023 Turkish parliamentary election =

- 14 May 2023

All 600 seats in the Grand National Assembly 301 seats needed for a majority
- Turnout: 87.05% (▲0.83 pp)
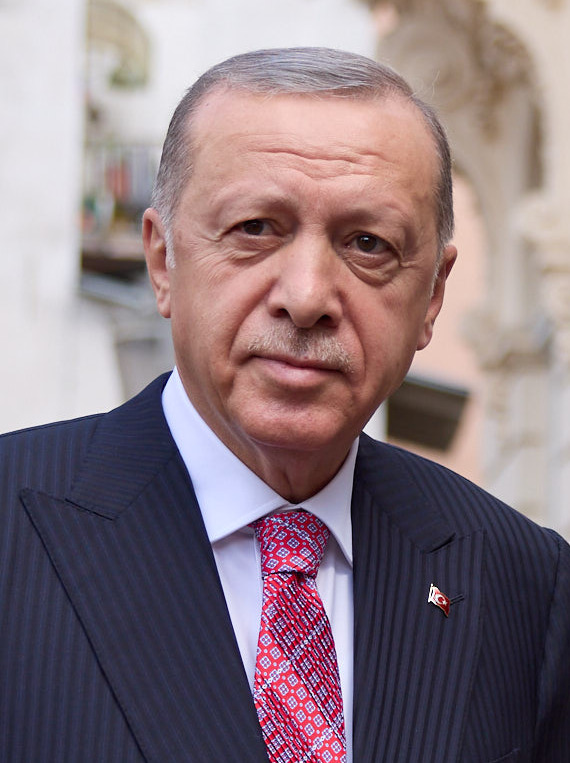

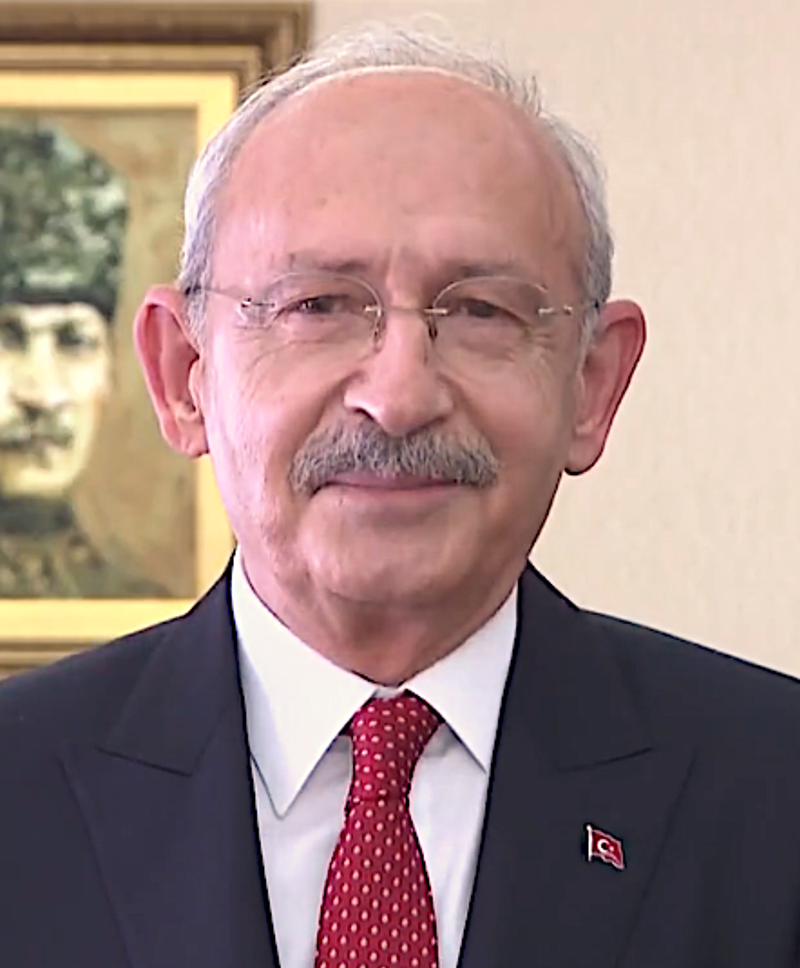

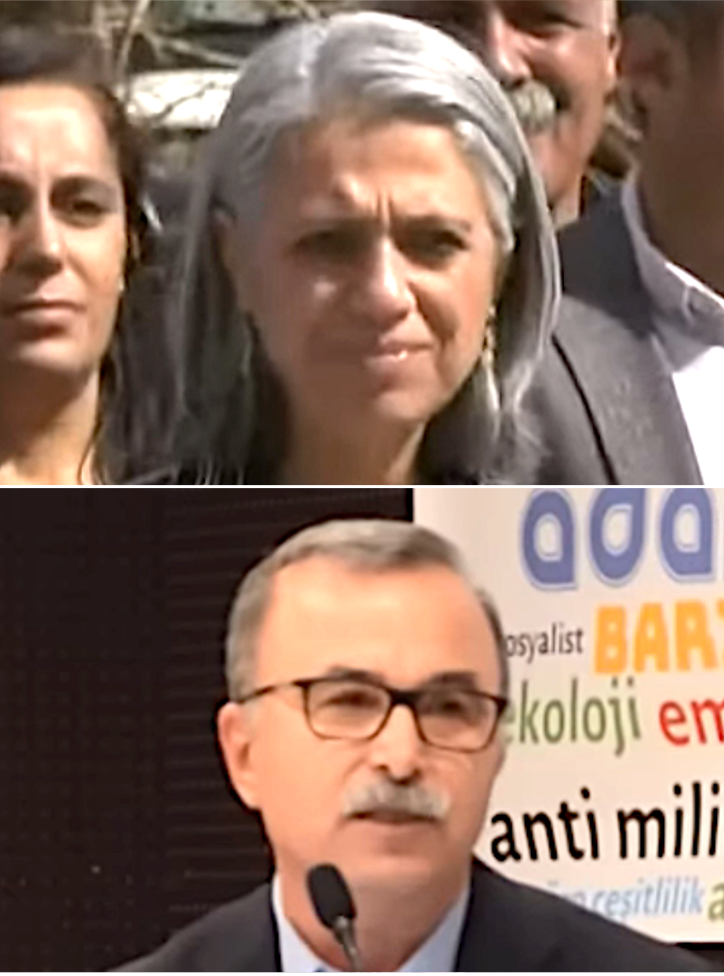

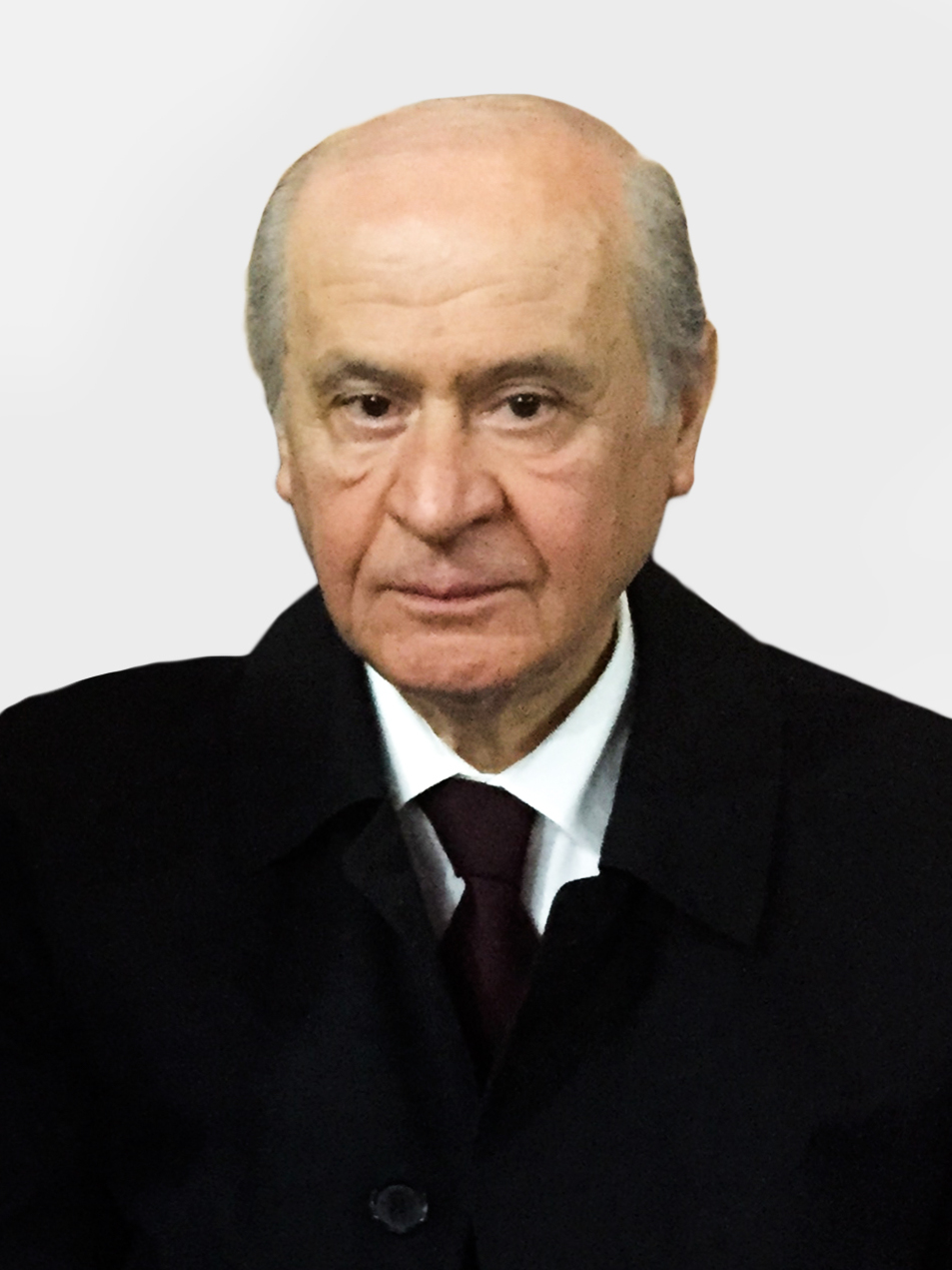

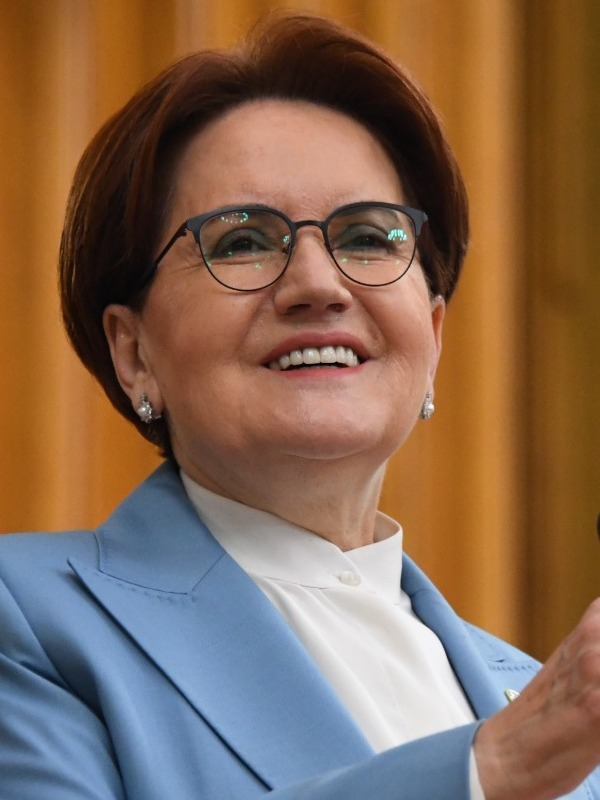

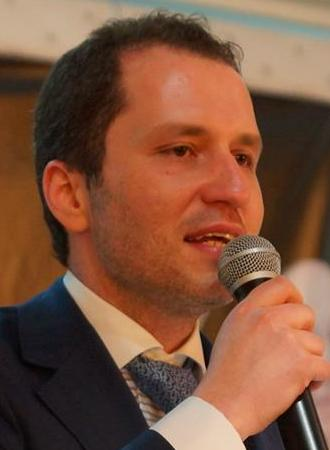

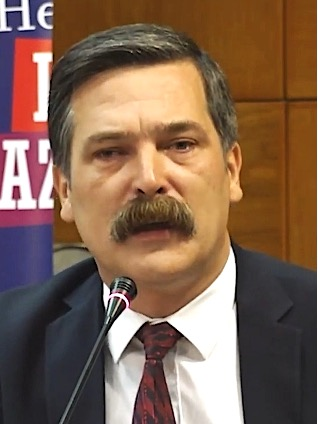
	First party	Second party	Third party
Leader	Recep Tayyip Erdoğan	Kemal Kılıçdaroğlu	Çiğdem Kılıçgün Uçar; İbrahim Akın
Party	AK Party	CHP	YSGP
Alliance	People	Nation	Labour & Freedom
Last election	42.56%, 295 seats	22.65%, 146 seats	11.70%, 65 seats (Note: As Peoples' Democratic Party (HDP). The full HDP list won 67 seats, of which two were taken by the Workers' Party of Turkey which contested the 2023 elections separately). Anticipating a ban from the closure case result, the HDP announced on 23 March that it would contest the vote under the allied Green Left party's ticket.)
Seats won	268	169	61
Seat change	▼27	▲23	▼4
Popular vote	19,387,412	13,791,299	4,803,774
Percentage	35.61%	25.33%	8.82%
Swing	▼6.95pp	▲2.68pp	▼2.88pp
	Fourth party	Fifth party	Sixth party
Leader	Devlet Bahçeli	Meral Akşener	Fatih Erbakan
Party	MHP	İYİ	YRP
Alliance	People	Nation	People
Last election	11.10%, 49 seats	9.96%, 43 seats	–
Seats won	50	43	5
Seat change	▲1	Steady	New
Popular vote	5,484,515	5,272,482	1,529,119
Percentage	10.07%	9.69%	2.81%
Swing	▼1.03pp	▼0.27pp	New
	Seventh party
Leader	Erkan Baş
Party	TİP
Alliance	Labour & Freedom
Last election	–
Seats won	4
Seat change	New
Popular vote	940,230
Percentage	1.73%
Swing	New
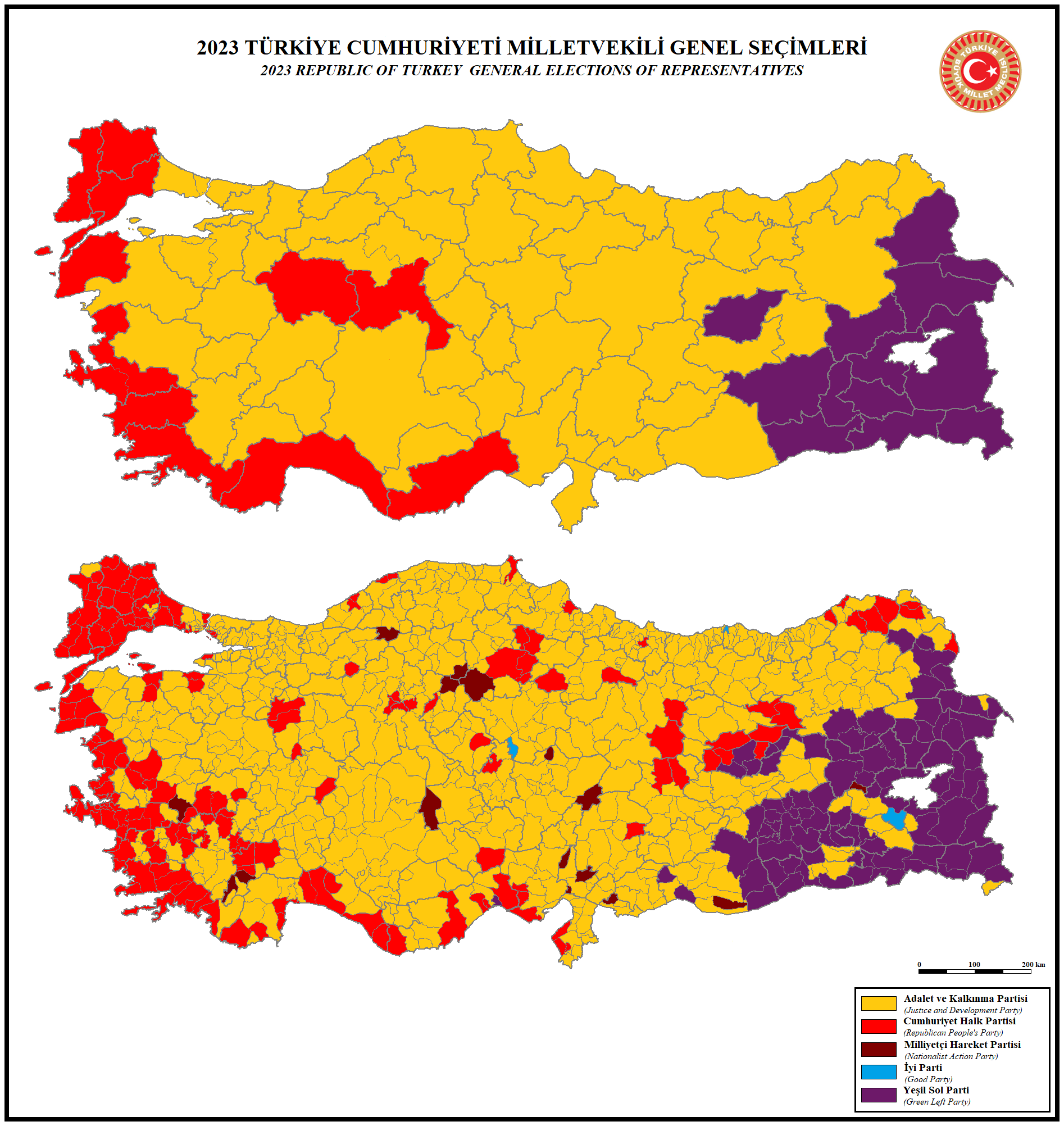
Speaker of the Assembly before election
Mustafa Şentop
AKP
Elected Speaker of the Assembly
Numan Kurtulmuş
AKP

Parliamentary elections were held in Turkey on 14 May 2023, alongside presidential elections, to elect all 600 members of the Grand National Assembly. The incoming members formed the 28th Parliament of Turkey. The elections had originally been scheduled to take place on June 18, but the government moved them forward by a month to avoid coinciding with the university exams, the Hajj pilgrimage and the start of the summer holidays. Prior to the election, the electoral threshold for a party to enter parliament was lowered from 10% to 7% by the ruling party.

The elections were contested by a total of 24 political parties. Some parties decided to participate in the elections as part of an electoral alliance, many of which were formed for the previous 2018 election and had been expanded since. The governing Justice and Development Party (AKP) of incumbent President Recep Tayyip Erdoğan lead the People's Alliance, which also included the Nationalist Movement Party (MHP), the Great Union Party (BBP) and the New Welfare Party (YRP). The largest opposition alliance was headed by the main opposition Republican People's Party (CHP) and included five other parties. These included the Good Party (İYİ), the Felicity Party (SP), the Democrat Party (DP) and two other parties headed by former senior AKP politicians, namely the Democracy and Progress Party (DEVA) of former economy minister Ali Babacan and the Future Party (GP) of former Prime Minister Ahmet Davutoğlu. The pro-Kurdish Peoples' Democratic Party (HDP) opted to run on the lists of the Party of Greens and the Left Future (YSGP) in light of a potential closure case. The YSGP itself headed the left-wing Labour and Freedom Alliance along with the Workers' Party of Turkey (TİP). Two smaller alliances, the Ancestral Alliance of presidential candidate Sinan Oğan and the Union of Socialist Forces, also participated in the elections for the first time.

The People's Alliance retained its majority in the parliament with 323 MPs. The AKP, led by incumbent president Erdoğan, won the highest percentage of the vote with 36%, though it suffered its worst result since 2002. MHP, the second largest party of the People's Alliance, outperformed expectations and won 10.1% of the votes. The alliance overall won just under 50% of the vote. The Nation Alliance only marginally improved on its 2018 vote, winning a combined 34% and 212 MPs. The Labour and Freedom Alliance suffered a decline in their vote, winning just over 10% and 66 seats. No other electoral alliance won seats. The election resulted in seven parties entering the parliament, which is a record in Turkish politics.

Many smaller parties ran on the lists of larger ones to avoid splitting the vote. Prior to the election, the CHP caused controversy by fielding 77 DEVA, Felicity Party, Future Party, and Democrat Party candidates on its own lists, of which 39 (14 DEVA, 10 Felicity, 10 Future, 3 Democrats, 1 IYI, and 1 Party for Change in Turkey) were elected — a significantly higher proportion than these parties' national share of support. These included former AKP ministers such as Sadullah Ergin (running as a DEVA candidate), who was widely criticised for his role as Justice Minister in the Ergenekon conspiracy against the Turkish Armed Forces. The AKP, meanwhile, was criticised for fielding members of the Free Cause Party (HÜDA PAR), a party known for its ties to the Kurdish Hezbollah, as candidates.

== Electoral system ==
The 600 members of the Grand National Assembly of Turkey will be elected by party-list proportional representation in 87 electoral districts, by the D'Hondt method. For the purpose of legislative elections, 77 of Turkey's 81 provinces serve as single districts. Due to their large populations, the provinces of Bursa and İzmir are divided into two districts, while the provinces of Ankara and Istanbul are each divided into three.

According to the Constitution of Turkey, any amendment to the election law can only apply a year after it comes into effect.

=== Lowering of the electoral threshold ===
At the initiative of the ruling AKP and its main political ally MHP, the national electoral threshold for a party to enter parliament was lowered from 10% to 7%. This was the first lowering of the threshold since it was introduced by the military junta following the 1980 Turkish coup d'état.

There is no threshold for independent candidates. Political parties can also opt to contest the election in a political alliance with other parties, removing the 7% requirement as long as the alliance as a whole wins more than 7% of the vote in total.

Other amendments to the election law includes the distribution of seats. Previously, parliamentary seats were distributed based on the vote share of each election alliance in any given district. Now, the seats are distributed based solely on the vote share of each political party in that district. If applied to the previous elections, the results would have been slightly more in line with the preferences of the voters on local level. For example, one Erzurum seat from IYI (4th largest party in Erzurum) would have gone to HDP (3rd largest party in Erzurum) and one Elazığ seat from CHP (3rd largest party in Elazığ) to MHP (2nd largest party in Elazığ).

=== Electoral districts ===
Turkey is split into 87 electoral districts, which elect a certain number of members to the Grand National Assembly of Turkey. The Assembly has a total of 600 seats, with each electoral district allocated a certain number of MPs in proportion to their population. The Supreme Electoral Council of Turkey conducts population reviews of each district before the election and can increase or decrease a district's number of seats according to their electorate.

In all but four cases, electoral districts share the same name and borders as the 81 provinces, with the exceptions being Ankara, Bursa, İzmir and Istanbul. Provinces electing between 19 and 36 MPs are split into two electoral districts, while any province electing above 36 MPs is divided into three. As the country's most populous provinces, Bursa and İzmir are divided into two subdistricts while Ankara and Istanbul are divided into three. The distribution of elected MPs per electoral district is shown below.

District	MPs
Adana	15
Adıyaman	5
Afyonkarahisar	6
Ağrı	4
Aksaray	4
Amasya	3
Ankara	36
Ankara (I)	13
Ankara (II)	11
Ankara (III)	12
Antalya	17
Ardahan	2
Artvin	2
Aydın	8
Balıkesir	9
Bartın	2
Batman	5
Bayburt	1
Bilecik	2
Bingöl	3
Bitlis	3

District	MPs
Bolu	3
Burdur	3
Bursa	20
Bursa (I)	10
Bursa (II)	10
Çanakkale	4
Çankırı	2
Çorum	4
Denizli	7
Diyarbakır	12
Düzce	3
Edirne	4
Elazığ	5
Erzincan	2
Erzurum	6
Eskişehir	6
Gaziantep	14
Giresun	4
Gümüşhane	2
Hakkâri	3
Hatay	11

District	MPs
Iğdır	2
Isparta	4
Istanbul	98
Istanbul (I)	35
Istanbul (II)	27
Istanbul (III)	36
İzmir	28
İzmir (I)	14
İzmir (II)	14
Kahramanmaraş	8
Kars	3
Kastamonu	3
Karabük	3
Karaman	3
Kayseri	10
Kilis	2
Kırklareli	3
Kırıkkale	3
Kırşehir	2
Kocaeli	14
Konya	15

District	MPs
Kütahya	5
Malatya	6
Manisa	10
Mardin	6
Mersin	13
Muğla	7
Muş	3
Nevşehir	3
Niğde	3
Ordu	6
Osmaniye	4
Rize	3
Sakarya	8
Samsun	9
Siirt	3
Sinop	2
Sivas	5
Şanlıurfa	14
Şırnak	4
Tekirdağ	8
Tokat	5

District	MPs
Trabzon	6
Tunceli	1
Uşak	3
Van	8
Yalova	3
Yozgat	4
Zonguldak	5
Total	600

== Parties ==
For political parties to achieve (nationwide) ballot access, they must be eligible to meet the requirements set by Law no. 298 on "Basic Provisions on Elections and Electoral Registers".

The Green Party, founded in September 2020, has been barred from the election by the Interior Ministry despite a court ruling against the ministry. As of 2022 the establishment of the Humanity and Freedom Party had been awaiting the Constitutional Court for four years after the completion of the legal process.

On 11 March 2023, the Supreme Election Council confirmed that 36 parties were eligible to run in the elections.

=== Contesting parties ===
The table below shows the places of alliances, parties, and independent candidates in the order they appear on the ballot paper. However, the ballot paper is not the same in every electoral district as some parties do not participate in every electoral district or are on another party's list.

List	Party		Chairperson(s)	Main ideology	Alliance
1	Nation Party	MİLLET	Cuma Nacar	Conservatism	—N/a
2	Rights and Freedoms Party	HAK-PAR	Düzgün Kaplan	Kurdish nationalism	—N/a
3	Communist Party of Turkey	TKP	Kemal İbrahim Okuyan	Communism	Union of Socialist Forces
4	Communist Movement of Turkey	TKH	Aysel Tekerek	Communism	Union of Socialist Forces
5	Left Party	SOL PARTİ	Önder İşleyen	Socialism	Union of Socialist Forces
6	Young Party	GENÇPARTİ	Murat Hakan Uzan	Kemalism	—N/a
7	Homeland Party	MEMLEKET	Muharrem İnce	Kemalism	—N/a
8	Great Unity Party	BÜYÜK BİRLİK	Mustafa Destici	Idealism	People's Alliance
9	Justice and Development Party	AK PARTİ	Recep Tayyip Erdoğan	Conservative democracy	People's Alliance
10	New Welfare Party	YENİDEN REFAH	Muhammed Ali Fatih Erbakan	Millî Görüş	People's Alliance
11	Nationalist Movement Party	MHP	Devlet Bahçeli	Idealism	People's Alliance
12	Party of the Greens and the Left Future	YEŞİL SOL PARTİ	İbrahim Akın, Çiğdem Kılıçgün Uçar	Kurdish nationalism	Labour and Freedom Alliance
13	Workers' Party of Turkey	TİP	Erkan Baş	Communism	Labour and Freedom Alliance
14	Justice Unity Party	AB PARTİ	İrfan Uzun	Nationalism	—N/a
15	Motherland Party	ANAP	İbrahim Çelebi	Liberal conservatism	—N/a
16	Innovation Party	YP	Öztürk Yılmaz	Kemalism	—N/a
17	People's Liberation Party	HKP	Nurullah Efe	Marxism–Leninism	—N/a
18	National Path Party	MİLLİ YOL	Remzi Çayır	Idealism	—N/a
19	Patriotic Party	VATAN PARTİSİ	Doğu Perinçek	Kemalism	—N/a
20	Power Union Party	GBP	Ali Karnap	Conservatism	—N/a
21	Republican People's Party	CHP	Kemal Kılıçdaroğlu	Kemalism	Nation Alliance
22	Good Party	İYİ PARTİ	Meral Akşener	Kemalism	Nation Alliance
23	Justice Party	AP	Vecdet Öz	Kemalism	Ancestral Alliance
24	Victory Party	—N/a	Ümit Özdağ	Anti-immigration	Ancestral Alliance
25	Independent candidate(s)				

=== Other eligible parties ===
The below table shows the remaining parties that were eligible to contest the election but decided run on the lists of other parties or decided not to field candidates.

Party		Chairperson	Main ideology	Supporting alliance	Course of action
DEVA	Democracy and Progress Party	Ali Babacan	Liberal conservatism	Nation Alliance	✓ Contesting from list of Republican People's Party
DSP	Democratic Left Party	Önder Aksakal	Ecevitism	People's Alliance	✓ Contesting from list of Justice and Development Party
DP	Democrat Party	Gültekin Uysal	Liberal conservatism	Nation Alliance	✓ Contesting from list of Republican People's Party
SAADET	Felicity Party	Temel Karamollaoğlu	Millî Görüş	Nation Alliance	✓ Contesting from list of Republican People's Party
HÜDA PAR	Free Cause Party	Zekeriya Yapıcıoğlu	Kurdish-Islamic synthesis	People's Alliance	✓ Contesting from list of Justice and Development Party
GELECEK PARTİSİ	Future Party	Ahmet Davutoğlu	Conservatism	Nation Alliance	✓ Contesting from list of Republican People's Party
BÜYÜK TÜRKİYE	Great Turkey Party	Hüseyin Durmaz	Turkish nationalism	People's Alliance	✗ The party withdrew to support People's Alliance
BTP	Independent Turkey Party	Hüseyin Baş	Kemalism	Nation Alliance	✗ The party withdrew to support Nation Alliance
EMEK	Labour Party	Ercüment Akdeniz	Marxism–Leninism	Labour and Freedom Alliance	✓ Contesting from list of Party of Greens and the Left Future
YTP	New Turkey Party	Engin Yılmaz	Social conservatism	—N/a	—N/a
TDP	Party for Change in Turkey	Mustafa Sarıgül	Social democracy	Nation Alliance	✓ Contesting from list of Republican People's Party
HDP	Peoples' Democratic Party	Mithat Sancar & Pervin Buldan	Minority rights	Labour and Freedom Alliance	✓ Contesting from list of Party of Greens and the Left Future

== List of alliances ==
Alliance		Members	Seats before	Seats after
1	People's Alliance	Justice and Development Party (AK PARTİ)	336 / 600	323 / 600
1	People's Alliance	Nationalist Movement Party (MHP)	336 / 600	323 / 600
1	People's Alliance	Great Unity Party (BÜYÜK BİRLİK)	336 / 600	323 / 600
1	People's Alliance	New Welfare Party (YENİDEN REFAH)	336 / 600	323 / 600
2	Nation Alliance	Republican People's Party (CHP) (Note: Republican People's Party will run under Good Party list in 7 provinces)	175 / 600	212 / 600
2	Nation Alliance	Good Party (İYİ PARTİ) (Note: Good Party will run under Republican People's Party list in 9 provinces)	175 / 600	212 / 600
2	Nation Alliance	Democracy and Progress Party (DEVA PARTİSİ) (Note: Participates in elections within the Republican People's Party)	175 / 600	212 / 600
2	Nation Alliance	Future Party (GELECEK PARTİSİ)	175 / 600	212 / 600
2	Nation Alliance	Felicity Party (SAADET)	175 / 600	212 / 600
2	Nation Alliance	Democrat Party (DP)	175 / 600	212 / 600
3	Labour and Freedom Alliance	Party of Greens and the Left Future (YEŞİL SOL PARTİ)	60 / 600	65 / 600
3	Labour and Freedom Alliance	Peoples' Democratic Party (HDP) (Note: Participates in elections within the Party of Greens and the Left Future)	60 / 600	65 / 600
3	Labour and Freedom Alliance	Workers' Party of Turkey (TİP)	60 / 600	65 / 600
3	Labour and Freedom Alliance	Labour Party (EMEP)	60 / 600	65 / 600
3	Labour and Freedom Alliance	Labourist Movement Party (EHP)	60 / 600	65 / 600
3	Labour and Freedom Alliance	Social Freedom Party (TÖP)	60 / 600	65 / 600
3	Labour and Freedom Alliance	Labor Democracy Party (İDP) (Note: Participates in elections within the Workers' Party of Turkey)	60 / 600	65 / 600
4	Ancestral Alliance	Victory Party (—)	1 / 600	0 / 600
4	Ancestral Alliance	Justice Party (AP)	1 / 600	0 / 600
4	Ancestral Alliance	My Country Party (ÜLKEM)	1 / 600	0 / 600
4	Ancestral Alliance	Turkey Alliance Party (—)	1 / 600	0 / 600
5	Union of Socialist Forces	Left Party (SOL PARTİ)	0 / 600	0 / 600
5	Union of Socialist Forces	Communist Party of Turkey (TKP)	0 / 600	0 / 600
5	Union of Socialist Forces	Communist Movement of Turkey (TKH)	0 / 600	0 / 600
5	Union of Socialist Forces	Revolution Movement (—)	0 / 600	0 / 600

== Opinion polls ==
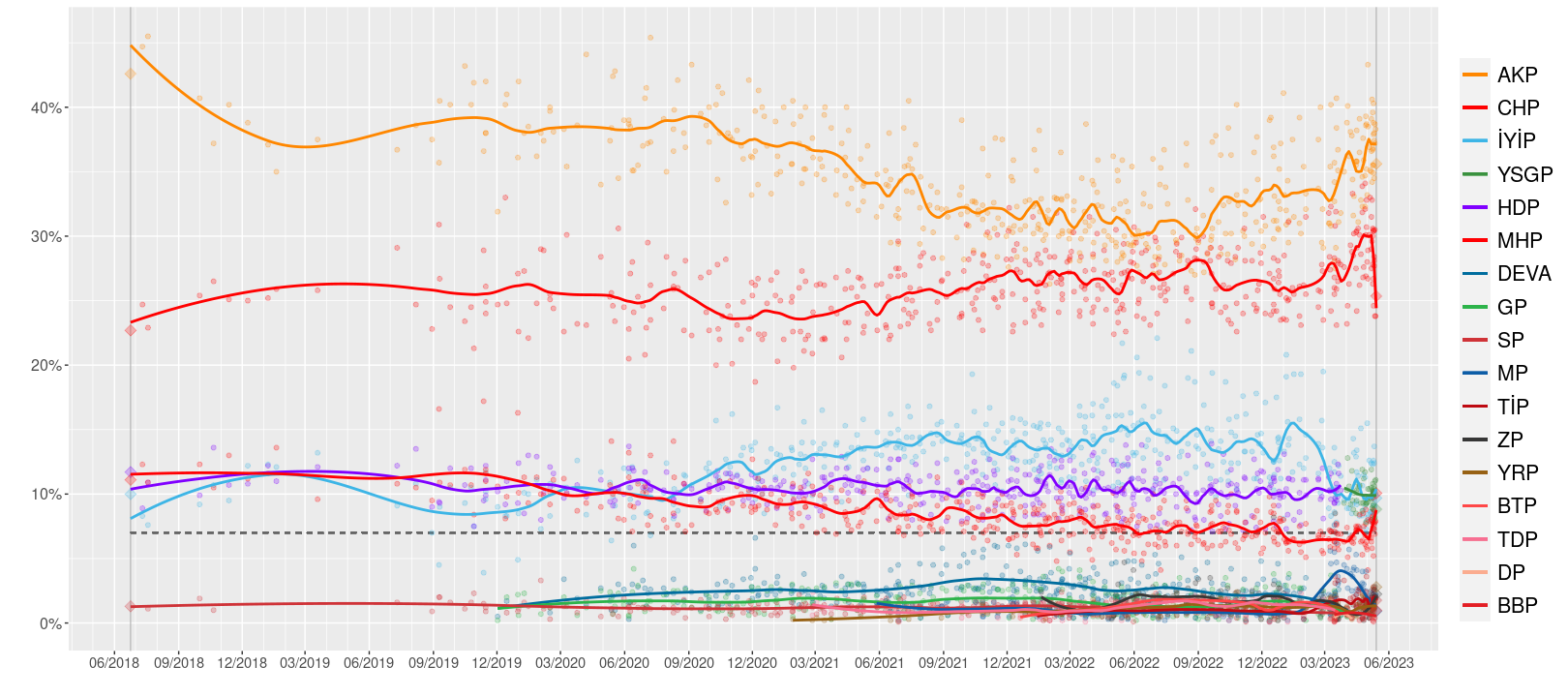

== Conduct ==
=== Political violence ===
During the election campaign, several occurrences that took place have been labelled as political violence. On 31 March 2023, the Istanbul headquarters of the Good Party was targeted in a shooting attack. No one was harmed in the shooting. Akşener criticised Erdoğan after the attack by saying "A political party cannot be intimidated one and a half months before an election. We are not afraid. I fear nothing but God. Mr. Recep (Erdoğan), I am not afraid of you. But you are the president and you are responsible for every citizen in this country." The attackers were emboldened by the president's harsh words against the opposition, Akşener said. Upon investigation, it became clear that a nighttime security guard had fired his gun at burglars – only to hit the building by mistake with two stray bullets. President Erdoğan said in response to Akşener "The truth has come out, are you now going to apologize to me?"

Recent attacks on other parties have raised issues of political polarisation and security in the country. On 1 May, a group of unidentified individuals armed with guns and sticks assaulted HUDAPAR youth members in Mersin. HUDAPAR was hosting an election campaign stand to help their electoral ally the AK Party. The HDP denied links to the attack, and urged its supporters to refrain against provocations.

== Results ==
Party or alliance		Votes	%	Seats	+/–
People's Alliance	Justice and Development Party	19,187,170	35.56	268	–27
People's Alliance	Nationalist Movement Party	5,421,800	10.05	50	+1
People's Alliance	New Welfare Party	1,510,745	2.80	5	New
People's Alliance	Great Unity Party	524,881	0.97	0	–1
People's Alliance	Total	26,935,107	49.91	323	–21
Nation Alliance	Republican People's Party	13,675,902	25.34	169	+23
Nation Alliance	Good Party	5,225,196	9.68	43	0
Nation Alliance	Total	19,078,164	35.35	212	+23
Labour and Freedom Alliance	Party of Greens and the Left Future	4,800,607	8.90	61	–4
Labour and Freedom Alliance	Workers' Party of Turkey	954,547	1.77	4	+2
Labour and Freedom Alliance	Total	5,759,958	10.67	65	–2
Ancestral Alliance	Victory Party	1,211,917	2.25	0	New
Ancestral Alliance	Justice Party	108,713	0.20	0	0
Ancestral Alliance	Total	1,325,635	2.46	0	New
Homeland Party		502,669	0.93	0	New
Union of Socialist Forces	Left Party	76,801	0.14	0	0
Union of Socialist Forces	Communist Party of Turkey	62,826	0.12	0	0
Union of Socialist Forces	Communist Movement of Turkey	17,222	0.03	0	0
Union of Socialist Forces	Total	159,277	0.30	0	New
Young Party		112,972	0.21	0	0
Motherland Party		66,102	0.12	0	0
Patriotic Party		52,720	0.10	0	0
Nation Party		52,314	0.10	0	0
Rights and Freedoms Party		42,509	0.08	0	0
Justice Unity Party		41,207	0.08	0	New
People's Liberation Party		31,831	0.06	0	0
Power Union Party		26,359	0.05	0	New
National Path Party		17,758	0.03	0	New
Innovation Party		11,171	0.02	0	New
Independents		226,831	0.42	0	0
Total		53,962,770	100.00	600	0
Valid votes		53,962,770	97.48		
Invalid/blank votes		1,393,311	2.52		
Total votes		55,356,081	100.00		
Registered voters/turnout		64,145,504	87.05		
Source: YSK
