= Union of Socialist Forces =

Turkish electoral alliance

Union of Socialist Forces Sosyalist Güç Birliği
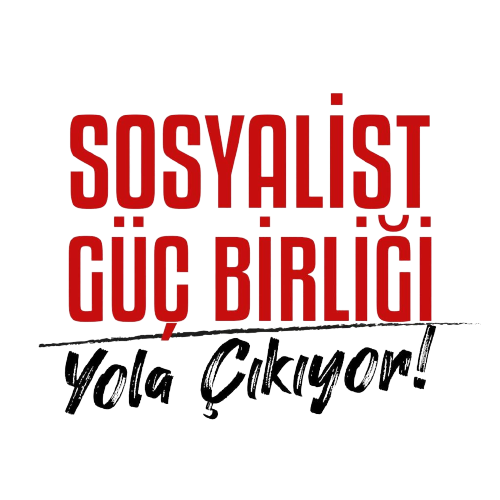
- Founded: 21 August 2022
- Dissolved: 28 May 2023
- Political position: Far-left
- Colors: Red

The Union of Socialist Forces (Turkish: Sosyalist Güç Birliği) was an electoral alliance in Turkey, formed by Left Party (SOL), Communist Party of Turkey (TKP), Communist Movement of Turkey (TKH) and Revolution Movement (DH) to contest the Turkish general elections in 2023. The alliance was made public on the 21 August 2022. The alliance was announced alongside a supporting declaration, signed by 226 Turkish public figures, including intellectuals, authors, trade unionists, artists, lawyers and journalists.

It had been stated by members of constituent parties that the Union of Socialist Forces was not merely an electoral alliance. The founding mission of the alliance was to create an independent, non-establishment line for the socialist left in Turkey outside of intra-system politics. But according to statements released after the election, the alliance has ended.

== Ideology ==
In their declaration document, the alliance offered five points as their ideological ground. These points were focused on forced nationalisation and anti-capitalism, societal equality and public ownership, anti-NATO and anti-American international policies, secularism and anti-clericalism, especially against Islamic sects in Turkey, and anti-discrimination in the Turkish society. The USF denoted that the Nation Alliance has "a right-wing, pro-business character" and "will not be able to solve the (real) problems of the country". The Alliance expressed that it was in favor of all peoples living in Turkey living their identities and cultures freely, and that the Kurdish people can express themselves as a people and live their culture and identities freely, but that they must continue their struggle to change Turkey together.

== Composition ==
Party	Abbr.	Leader	Ideology	Seats in parliament
Left Party; SOL Parti	SOL	Önder İşleyen	Revolutionary socialism Left-wing populism Secularism	0 / 600
Communist Party of Turkey; Türkiye Komünist Partisi	TKP	Kemal Okuyan	Communism; Marxism–Leninism; Hard Euroscepticism; Secularism; Anti-clericalism	0 / 600
Communist Movement of Turkey; Türkiye Komünist Hareketi	TKH	Aysel Tekerek	Communism; Marxism–Leninism; Hard Euroscepticism; Secularism	0 / 600
Revolution Movement; Devrim Hareketi	DH	Erçin Fırat	Communism; Marxism–Leninism; Republicanism	0 / 600
Socialist Workers' Party of Turkey Türkiye Sosyalist İşçi Partisi	TSİP	Turgut Koçak	Communism; Marxism–Leninism; Anti-Revisionism	0 / 600

== Supporting parties ==
Party	Abbr.	Leader	Ideology	Seats in parliament
Socialist Republican Party Sosyalist Cumhuriyet Partisi	SCP	Yılmaz Ersezer	National Democratic Revolution; Left-wing Kemalism; Scientific socialism Hard Euroscepticism; Secularism; Eurasianism	0 / 600
Revolutionary Workers' Party^α Devrimci İşçi Partisi	DİP	Ömer Sungur Savran	Trotskyism; Revolutionary socialism Hard Euroscepticism	0 / 600

== Notes ==
^α Exclusively supports the Communist Movement of Turkey.

== See also ==
- Labour and Freedom Alliance
- United June Movement
