= Erkan Baş =

Turkish politician (born 1979)

Erkan Baş MP
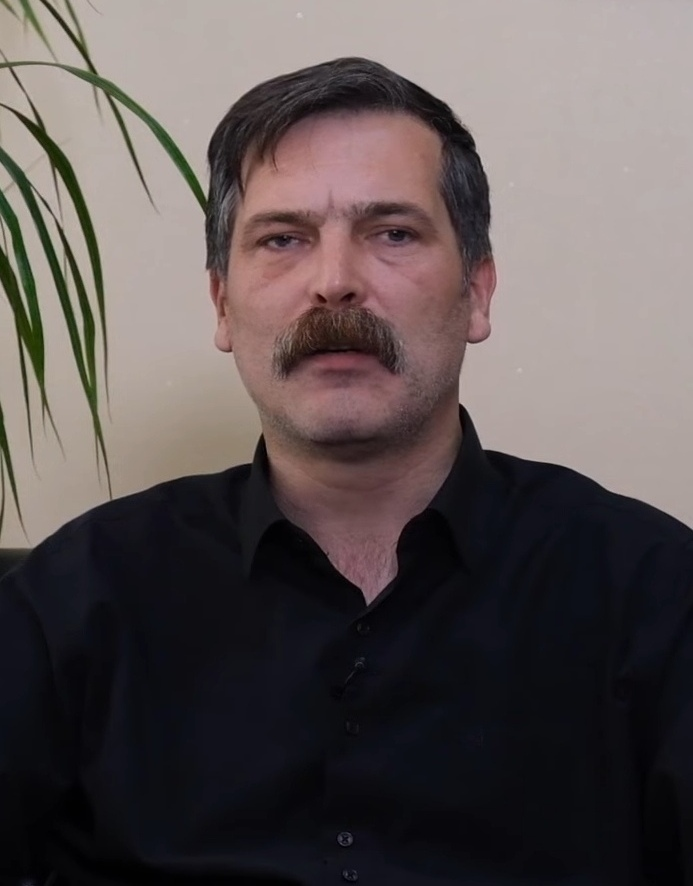
- Erkan Baş in 2023

Member of the Grand National Assembly
- Incumbent
- Assumed office 7 July 2018
- Constituency: İstanbul (I) (2018); İstanbul (III) (2023)

Leader of the Workers' Party of Turkey
- Incumbent
- Assumed office 7 November 2017
- Preceded by: Position established

Leader of the Communist Party of Turkey
- In office 1 February 2009 – August 2009
- Preceded by: Aydemir Güler
- Succeeded by: Position abolished

Personal details
- Born: 14 July 1979 (age 47) Berlin, Germany
- Party: Workers' Party of Turkey
- Education: Istanbul University
- Occupation: Politician

Erkan Baş (born 14 July 1979) is a Turkish socialist politician and academic who currently serves as the leader of the Workers Party of Turkey (TİP) and an MP for Istanbul.

== Early life and education ==
Erkan Baş was born on 14 July 1979 in Berlin to a Bosniak immigrant family from Sandžak. His family name was Jusović in former Yugoslavia. His father was a worker who went to Germany for work and his mother was a housewife, who also has been a textile worker for a while.

Erkan Baş completed his primary, secondary and high school education in Istanbul and graduated from Istanbul University, Faculty of Literature, Department of History of Science. He has completed his undergraduate studies in the History of Science Department affiliated to the Istanbul University Faculty of Literature. He worked as guest lecturer at Istanbul Technical University Department of Humanities and Social Sciences for a while. He was removed from office by the school administration, as the administration did not concur with giving the demanded rights of cafeteria workers, something Baş supported strongly and fought for.

== Early political career ==
Erkan Baş was a member of the Socialist Power Party (SİP) at a young age, and also has been a co-founder of the Communist Party of Turkey and has assumed various responsibilities within the party. He was mostly active in the Istanbul organization, as he became the secretary of the province of Istanbul, and was a part of the Bureau of the Organization and the Central Committee. During his tenure, the party carried out the press statement in Taksim Square in the 1 May 2008 demonstrations. He also participated in a student rally in Ankara against legal regulations that would make Hijabs possible to be worn at universities.

== General Presidency and Collective Leadership in TKP ==
At the TKP 9th Congress, Aydemir Güler left his post as president, and instead, Erkan Baş was elected to the post of president of the party. The TKP General Assembly entered into force with the congressional decision taken to facilitate party representation. The Party Central Committee abolished the "general presidency" office after about 6 months, as this move did not bring about the desired success. The TKP is ruled by the Party Central Committee as a collective leader. However, TKP split in 2014 into two: KP and HTKP, the latter founded by the faction led by Erkan Baş. In 2017, HTKP members, joining forces with different sections of the Turkish left-wing, founded the Workers' Party of Turkey (TİP).

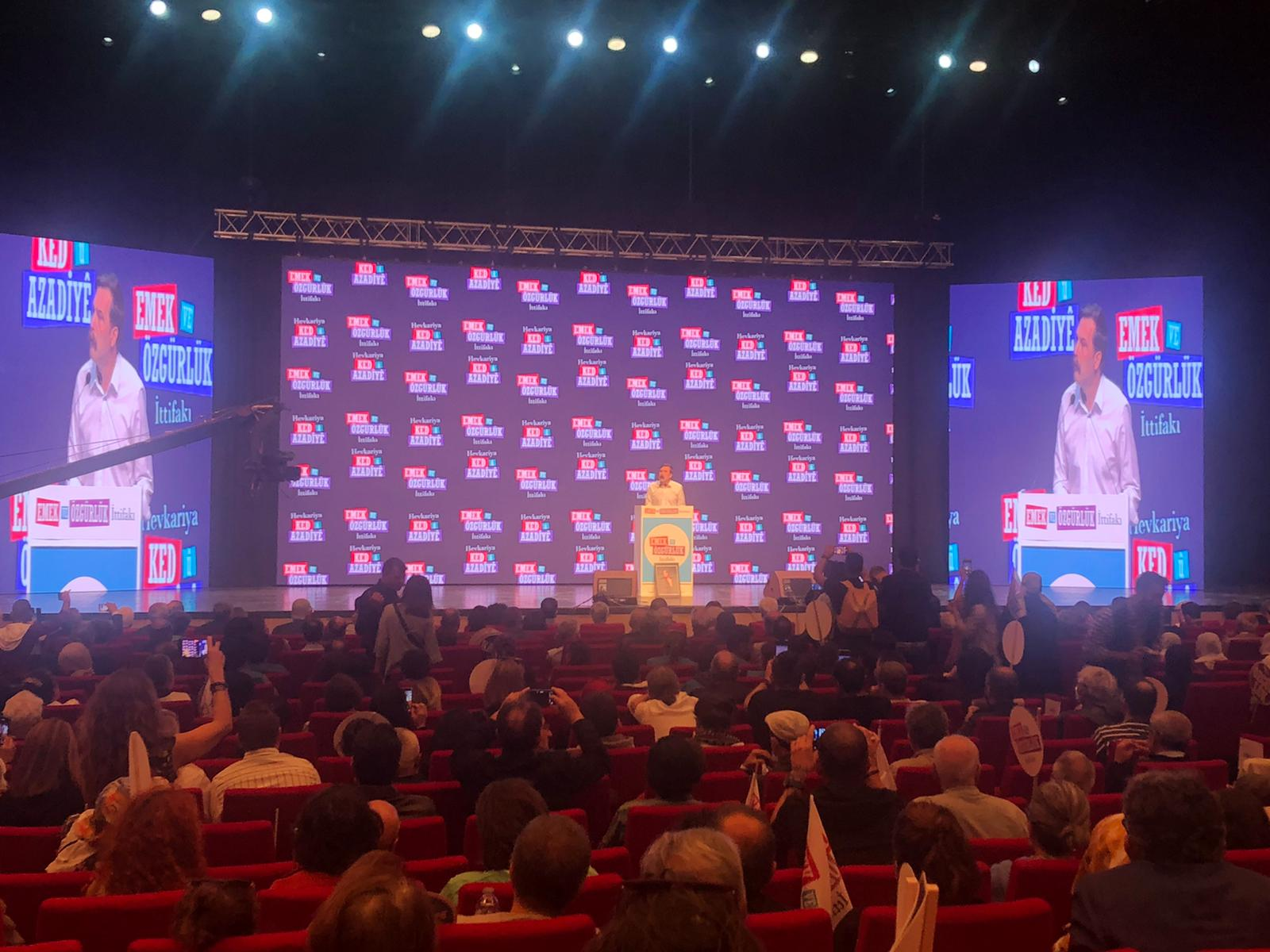
Erkan Baş giving a speech in the public announcement for Labour and Freedom Alliance as the leader of TİP in 2022.

== Workers' Party of Turkey (2017–present) ==
Baş became a parliamentary candidate of the Peoples' Democratic Party for the 2018 Turkish general election, in which he was elected as a member of the parliament for Istanbul. In November 2018, it was announced that he and Barış Atay would both resign from the HDP, and continue their political work under the Workers' Party of Turkey (TİP) instead. Although members of parliament from TİP got elected through HDP and later resigned from HDP, the two parties maintain close ties and act together on many issues. The possibility of an electoral alliance in the upcoming elections was given as a possibility. On 25 August 2022, HDP, TİP, other left-wing parties put the groundwork for their electoral alliance, known as the Labour and Freedom Alliance. Under the leadership of Baş, the party was able to increase its seats to four in the parliament, and TİP has become one of the most fierce opponents against Erdoğan and AKP.
