= Communist Movement of Turkey =

Communist Movement of Turkey Türkiye Komünist Hareketi
- Abbreviation: TKH
- Chairperson: Aysel Tekerek
- Founded: 21 August 2015
- Split from: People's Communist Party of Turkey
- Headquarters: Ankara, Turkey
- Membership (2026): ▼853
- Ideology: Communism; Marxism–Leninism; Socialist republicanism Anti-imperialism; Anti-capitalism; Hard Euroscepticism; Laicism
- Political position: Far-left
- National affiliation: United June Movement (2015-2022); Union of Socialist Forces (2022–2023)
- Colours: Red, yellow
- Slogan: Boyun Eğme! (Don't Bow Down!)

Website
- tkh.org.tr

The Communist Movement of Turkey (Turkish: Türkiye Komünist Hareketi, TKH) is a communist party in Turkey. The TKH was split from the People's Communist Party of Turkey in 2015, which was split from the Communist Party of Turkey in 2014.

The TKH is one of the components in the United June Movement, a political coalition initiative which was founded after Gezi Park revolt.

In a press conference held in Ankara in August 2022, it was announced that the party along with the Communist Party of Turkey, the Revolutionary Movement and the Left Party would form a coalition for the 2023 national election; this coalition was entitled the Union of Socialist Forces.

Other Logo of the Communist Movement of Turkey (TKH)

== See also ==
- List of political parties in Turkey
