= Düzce (electoral district) =

Electoral district for the Grand National Assembly of Turkey

Coordinates: 37°50′N 34°45′E

- electoral district for the Grand National Assembly of Turkey
- Düzce shown within Turkey
- Province: Düzce
- Electorate: 239,422

Current electoral district
- Created: 2002
- Seats: 3
- MPs: List: Fevai Arslan AKP Osman Çakır AKP İbrahim Korkmaz AKP
- Turnout at last election: 90.67%
- Representation
- AK Party: 2 / 3
- CHP: 1 / 3

Düzce is an electoral district of the Grand National Assembly of Turkey. It elects three members of parliament (deputies) to represent the province of the same name for a four-year term by the D'Hondt method, a party-list proportional representation system.

== Members ==
Population reviews of each electoral district are conducted before each general election, which can lead to certain districts being granted a smaller or greater number of parliamentary seats.

Düzce is the newest electoral district in Turkey, with the province being formed in November 1999 and electing its first Members of Parliament in the 2002 general election. Previously, it was part of the Bolu electoral district. It has only returned AK Party MPs since its creation.

MPs for Düzce, 2002 onwards
Election	2002 (22nd Parliament)	2007 (23rd Parliament)	2011 (24th Parliament)	June 2015 (25th Parliament)	November 2015 (26th Parliament)	2018 (27th Parliament)
MP	Fahri Çakır; AK Party	Celal Erbay; AK Party	Fevai Arslan; AK Party			Fahri Çakır; AK Party
MP	Metin Kaşıkoğlu; AK Party		Osman Çakır; AK Party	Faruk Özlü; AK Party		Ümit Yılmaz; MHP
MP	Yaşar Yakış; AK Party		İbrahim Korkmaz; AK Party	Ayşe Keşir; AK Party		

== General elections ==
=== June 2015 ===
June 2015 general election: Düzce
Party	Candidate	Votes	%	±%
AK Party				
CHP				
MHP				
HDP				
DYP				
AnaParti				
HAK-PAR				
HAP				
Communist				
MP				
Centre				
TURK Party				
HKP				
LDP				
SAADET				
DSP				
YP				
DP				
Patriotic				
BTP				
Total votes				
Rejected ballots				
Turnout				

=== 2011 ===
2011 general election: Düzce
Party	Candidate	Votes	%	±%
AK Party	3 elected 0: 1. İbrahim Korkmaz ✓; 2. Fevai Arslan ✓; 3. Osman Çakır ✓	141,181	65.94	▲5.33
MHP	None elected: 1. Ömer Küçük ✗; 2. İsa Yıldırım ✗; 3. Aydın Koç ✗	34,776	16.24	▼5.47
CHP	none elected: 1. Selçuk Yanmaz ✗; 2. Basri Karslıoğlu ✗; 3. İlknur Başak Tütüncü ✗	26,578	12.41	▲1.78
SAADET	None elected: 1. Aptullah Yalman ✗; 2. Selim Gökdemir ✗; 3. Murat Aşık ✗	3,832	1.78	▼2.62
HAS Party	None elected: 1. Selahattin Aydın ✗; 2. Atilla Sağlam ✗; 3. Dilek Yılmaz Kocabıyık ✗	2,006	1.40	▲1.40
DP	None elected: 1. Yüksel Binici ✗; 2. Gül Ali Deleşoğlu ✗; 3. İsmail Baklacı ✗	1,344	0.62	▼6.10
Büyük Birlik	None elected: 1. Bayram Bilgin ✗; 2. Kürşad Kalay ✗; 3. Hakan Oktay ✗	1,174	0.54	▲0.54
DSP	None elected: 1. Zeyneti Bayri Ünal ✗; 2. Çelik Mustafa Durdu ✗; 3. Mehmet Han ✗	479	0.22	N/A
DYP	None elected: 1. Sinan Çakmakcı ✗; 2. Sabahattin Duman ✗; 3. Mustafa İmam ✗	429	0.20	▲0.20
Labour	None elected: 1. Sebahattşn Dursun ✗; 2. Sultan Açık ✗; 3. Sibel Aysever ✗	353	0.16	▼0.06
HEPAR	None elected: 1. Şenol Efe ✗; 2. Nurhan Doğan ✗; 3. Davut Maden ✗	291	0.13	▲0.13
TKP	None elected: 1. Kemal Kaan Arslanoğlu ✗; 2. Barbaros Reis ✗; 3. Belgin İnam ✗	208	0.09	▼0.03
Nationalist Conservative	None elected: 1. Mehmet Albayrak ✗; 2. Cihat Hartlı ✗; 3. Ömer Özel ✗	173	0.08	▲0.08
MP	None elected: 1. Hasan Alçelik ✗; 2. Osman Söğüt ✗; 3. Abdulkadir Çakıroğlu ✗	141	0.06	▲0.05
Liberal Democrat	None elected: 1. İsmail Çelebi ✗; 2. Şinasi Dikmen ✗; 3. Yakup Keleş ✗	112	0.05	▼0.11
Total votes		214,077	100.00	
Rejected ballots		3,693	1.70	▲0.68
Turnout		217,075	90.67	▲0.41

== Presidential elections ==
=== 2014 ===
2014 presidential election: Düzce
Party	Candidate	Votes	%
AK Party	Recep Tayyip Erdoğan	147,476	73.57
Independent	Ekmeleddin İhsanoğlu	49,316	24.60
HDP	Selahattin Demirtaş	3,671	1.83
Total votes		200,463	100.00
Rejected ballots		4,110	2.01
Turnout		204,573	81.69
Recep Tayyip Erdoğan win			
