= Motherland Party (Turkey, 2011) =

Motherland Party Anavatan Partisi
- Abbreviation: ANAP
- Chairperson: İbrahim Çelebi
- Secretary-General: Okan Niğdeli
- Deputy Chairman: Fatih Güllüoğlu
- Founder: İbrahim Çelebi
- Founded: 11 September 2011; 15 years ago
- Split from: Democrat Party
- Headquarters: Ankara, Turkey
- Membership (2026): ▼22,251
- Ideology: Turkish nationalism; Conservatism; Ordoliberalism; Libertarianism; Minarchism; Irredentism; Özalism
- Political position: Centre-right
- Colours: Gold
- Municipal Assemblies: 6 / 20,498

Website
- www.anavatan.org.tr

The Motherland Party (Turkish: Anavatan Partisi, abbreviated as ANAP) is a political party in Turkey founded in 2011. It claims to be the successor of the original Motherland Party founded in 1983 by Turgut Özal, which dissolved in 2009. Its current president is İbrahim Çelebi.

== History ==
On 11 September 2011, the party was re-established, with the same ideology as the first organization. Its current president is İbrahim Çelebi.

On 9 March 2023, a pro-Erdoğan journalist, Mahmut Övür claimed that ANAP will join the People's Alliance. Eventually, ANAP decided to support Sinan Oğan instead.

== Election results ==
=== General elections ===
Grand National Assembly of Turkey
Election date	Party leader	Number of votes	% of votes	Seats won	Government
2023	İbrahim Çelebi	65,496	0.12%	0 / 600	
