= Young Party =

Young Party Genç Parti
- Abbreviation: GENÇPARTİ (official); GP (unofficial)
- Chairperson: Burçin Şahindur
- General Secretary: Melek Dingaz
- Founder: Cem Uzan
- Founded: 26 November 1992 (as YDP); 10 July 2002 (as GP); 23 August 2002 (merged)
- Headquarters: Ankara, Turkey
- Membership (2026): ▼23,759
- Ideology: Kemalism; Economic liberalism; Populism; Pro-Europeanism
- Colours: Red (official); Salmon; Grey (customary)
- Slogan: Ezilenler iktidar olacak ("The oppressed will come to power")
- Anthem: Gençlik Marşı (Youth Anthem)

The Young Party (Turkish: Genç Parti, GP) is a populist political party in Turkey. The chairperson of GENÇPARTİ is Burçin Şahindur.

== History ==
=== 2002 elections ===
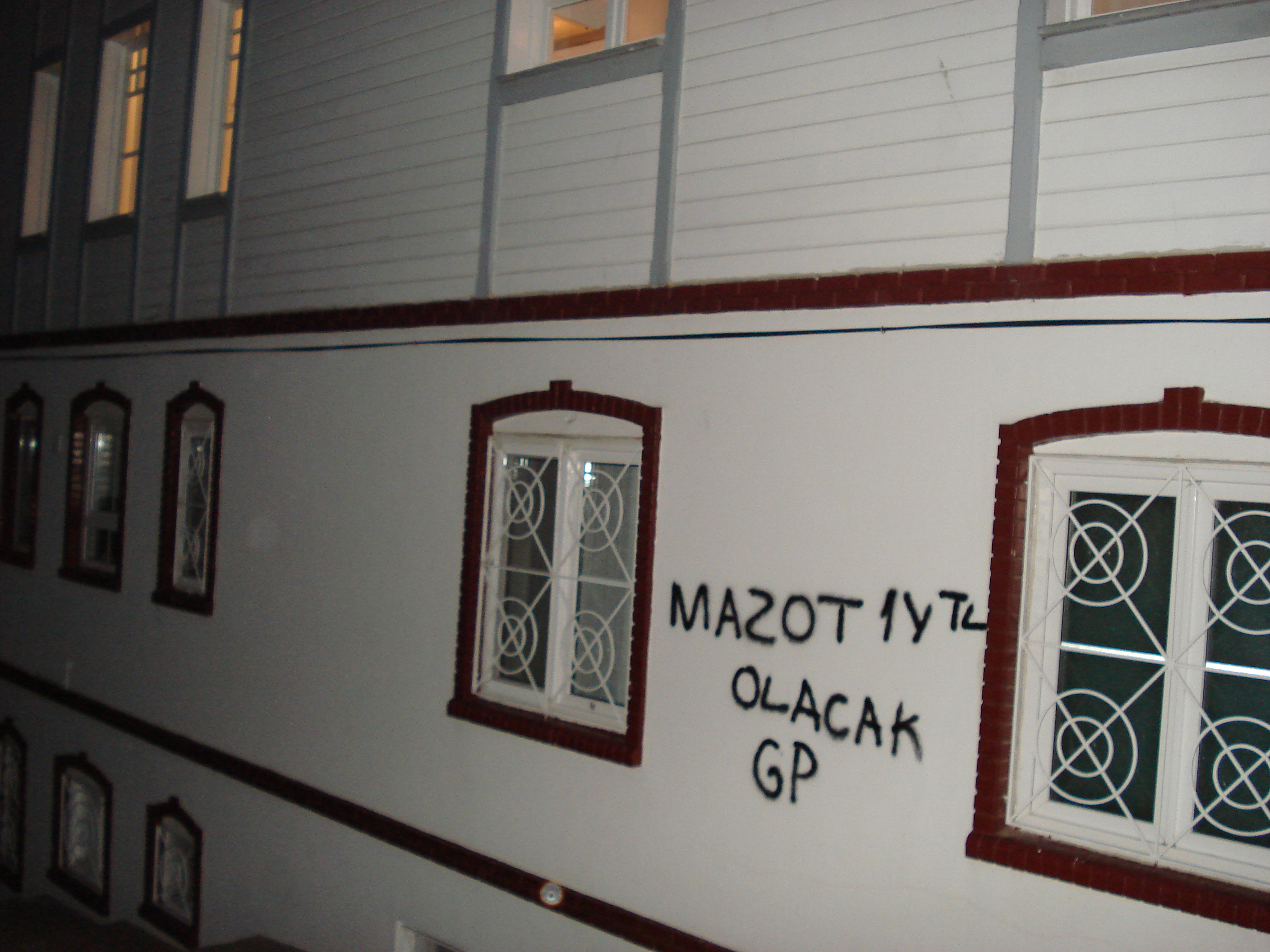
"Diesel oil will be 1 lira!" — was one of the promises of Genç Party

Cem Uzan entered politics 90 days before the 2002 elections. Young Party was not eligible to enter the elections and Yeniden Doğuş Partisi (YDP) was a small party which was eligible to enter elections. So, money was poured by Uzan to take over YDP by delegate elections. In the legislative elections on 3 November 2002, the party got 7.5% of the popular vote and no seats. It was considered as success for a political party to get 7.5% of the vote at the first election entered.

=== 2007 elections ===
After the 2002 elections, TMSF assumed ownership of Uzan's companies and later sold them. Some saw this as an attempt of the current parliament to stop Cem Uzan and his Young Party. Young Party only won 3.3% of the vote in 2007 Turkish general election and its candidates were not elected as members of the Grand National Assembly of Turkey. Compared with the 2002 elections, this result means a loss of 4.22% of the public vote.

== Media power of the party ==
Cem Uzan was the owner of Star TV and Star newspaper and used his newspaper and TV station to the best of his ability to promote his party, which is why he has been labelled a Turkish version of Silvio Berlusconi. When he was under investigation, he used advertising space between the first and second halves of Champions League football games to launch political assaults upon his opponents. After his tough speech about current Prime Minister (Recep Tayyip Erdoğan), TMSF assumed ownership of his companies; the companies were later sold.

== Some party members ==
Other than Cem Uzan, Kurdish arabesque star İbrahim Tatlıses, parliament member Emin Şirin, former parliament member Adil Asirimand and some new politicians like Kaan Aytuğ, Cenk Aktan are some of the recognisable members of the Young Party.

== Election results ==
=== General elections ===
General election record of Youth Party (YP)
Election	Leader	Vote	Result	Map
3 November 2002	Cem Uzan	2,284,644	%7,25	
22 July 2007	Cem Uzan	1,064,871	%3,04	
14 May 2023	Hakan Uzan	112,972	%0.21	

== See also ==
- List of political parties in Turkey
