= Aydemir Güler =

Turkish politician (born 1961)

General Secretary Aydemir Güler

General Secretary of Communist Party of Turkey
- In office 1993–2001
- Preceded by: Office established
- Succeeded by: Kemal Okuyan

Member of Communist Party of Turkey General Committee

Personal details
- Born: 1961 (age 64–65) Istanbul, Turkey
- Party: TKP
- Education: Boğaziçi University; Istanbul University
- Occupation: politician

Aydemir Güler (pronounced [ajdemiɾ ɡyɫeɾ]; born 1961) is a Turkish communist politician and a former leader of Communist Party of Turkey (TKP).

== Biography ==
Güler was born in 1961 in Istanbul, Turkey. He graduated from St. Joseph High School and Department of Economics, Boğaziçi University. He worked as an assistant in Faculty of Economics, Istanbul University. He received a M.Sc. degree here.

== Political career ==
He became a founder member of Party for Socialist Turkey in 1992. After the party was banned, he was elected as the new chairman of Party for Socialist Power, founded in 1993. In 2001, Party for Socialist Power changed its name to Communist Party of Turkey (Türkiye Komünist Partisi, TKP) and Güler was elected as the chairman of TKP. In the 9th Congress, he quit this post in accordance with the congress decisions for rejuvenation and a political leap forward. 29-year-old Central Committee member Erkan Baş replaced him.

As a member of the Political Bureau of TKP, Güler still contributes left-aligned journals, mainly related with TKP, with his articles.
