= Left Party (Turkey) =

Left Party Sol Parti
- Abbreviation: SOL Parti
- Leader: Önder İşleyen
- Founded: 21 January 1996 (as Freedom and Solidarity Party); December 22, 2019 (rebranding)
- Headquarters: Ankara, Turkey
- Membership (2026): ▲6,053
- Ideology: Socialism; Left-wing populism Anti-capitalism; Secularism
- Political position: Left-wing
- National affiliation: United June Movement (2015–2022); Union of Socialist Forces (2022–2023)
- European affiliation: Party of the European Left (associated member)
- Colors: Red and blue
- District municipalities: 1 / 973
- Belde Municipalities: 1 / 388
- Municipal Assemblies: 5 / 20,952

Party flag

Website
- http://solparti.org

The Left Party (Turkish: Sol Parti, often written as SOL Parti) is a secular, socialist political party in Turkey. The party was founded in 1996 as the "Freedom and Solidarity Party" (Turkish: Özgürlük ve Dayanışma Partisi – ÖDP) but changed its name to "Left Party" at the 8th Extraordinary Congress held in Ankara on December 22, 2019.

Although the leadership of the renamed Left Party did not reject the legacy of its predecessor (ÖDP), which was more inclined to libertarian socialism and political pluralism ideologically, the party tends to differentiate itself from the past. It now adheres to the guiding principles of socialist politics (including public ownership, social justice, and equality), embraces the ideas and historical achievements of the Marxist and left-wing revolutionary tradition in Turkey (more specifically, the party cadres consist of former militants and sympathizers of radical-left Devrimci Yol movement in the 1970s), and included the elements of left-wing populism in its manifesto.

In retrospect, neither the Left Party nor its predecessor ÖDP demonstrated significant electoral success in Turkey. The party has never been able to achieve a vote share of 1%, remaining far below Turkey's 10 percent national election threshold. Thus, it did not have any opportunity to be represented in the parliament as a party. However, the party launched and carried out several political campaigns to build extra-parliamentary opposition in Turkey, often together with other left-wing groups and parties, civil society organizations and trade unions. Also, in different local elections, it had minor achievements in places like Hopa. Today, the Left Party has no single leader. Instead, it is ruled by the Board of Presidents consisting of four members (including Önder İşleyen [official leader], Pelin Bektaş, Çiçek Çatalkaya and İlknur Başer).

The party is a associated member of the Party of the European Left and, up until July 2022, was nationally affiliated with the United June Movement when it was announced, in a press conference in Ankara, that the party along with the Communist Party of Turkey, the Revolutionary Movement and the Communist Movement of Turkey would form a coalition for the 2023 national election, called the Union of Socialist Forces.

== History ==
It was founded in 1996 as a merger of several left-wing groupings. In the 1999 general election, its first major electoral outing, the party polled 0.8% of the vote, falling far behind the 10% threshold required for parliamentary representation. A deep internal crisis followed and by 2001, several of the initial groupings left. In 2002 elections, the party's share of the national vote fell further to 0.3%.

In the 2004 local elections, the ÖDP gained control of two town halls in Artvin and Yozgat provinces. In these elections, the ÖDP had joined an electoral coalition with the pro-Kurdish left-wing Democratic People's Party (Turkey) (DEHAP) and the center-left Social Democratic People's Party (SHP). At the next 2009 local elections, Mithat Nehir was the sole victorious ÖDP candidate in the entire republic (17,723 votes for the whole country, i.e. 0.04%), and became mayor of the Samandağ district.

Ufuk Uras, who was then the president of the party was elected to the parliament from the independents' ticket, during the 2007 general election. The party's formal lists, which hadn't fielded candidates in several key constituencies in support of the left-wing candidates standing on the independents' ticket, polled 0.15% in that poll.

In the 6th congress held on June 20, 2009, the delegates elected Alper Taş as the new leader, solely nominated as the chairmanship. Apart from the discussions on some political headlines, Party Assembly consisting of sixty people was also assigned. In this congress, the signals that the party will have a more anti-capitalist and anti-imperialist route were given.

Former chairman Ufuk Uras resigned from ÖDP on June 19, 2009, one day before the congress. During a press conference at Parliament, Uras said, “We are resigning together with the Freedom Left, who have worked in the founding of the party and held various positions at different times in the ÖDP – from provincial and district branch administration to membership in the party council, central steering and discipline committees – where we have been struggling since its founding for a historic meeting that overrides the existing structures.”

In the 8th extraordinary congress on 22 December 2019, the party changed its name to Left Party.

== Tendencies ==
The Libertarian Socialist Platform within the Freedom and Solidarity Party is a successor to the Dev Yol radical left-wing movement. Other minor groups are New Way (USFI member), Liberation Movement (joined Socialist Democracy Party in 2002), Odak that links to Direniş Hareketi (founded as THKP-C/Third Way and joined Socialist Democracy Party in 2002), Socialist Labor Movement. Libertarian Left Platform, the tendency that was supportive of Ufuk Uras left the party with Uras in June 2009 and was one of the groups that eventually established the Peoples' Democratic Party.

== Election results ==
=== General elections ===
Election	Votes	Share	Seats	Leader
1999	248,553	0.80%	0 / 600	Ufuk Uras
2002	105,862	0.47%	0 / 600	Ufuk Uras
2007	52,055	0.15%	0 / 600	Bekir Kemal Ulusaler
2023	76,801	0.14%	0 / 600	Önder İşleyen

=== Local elections ===
Election	Votes	Share	Number of Municipalities	Leader
1999	264,136	0.84%	2	Ufuk Uras
2004	12,379	0.04%	2	Hayri Kozanoğlu
2009	67,984	0.17%	4	Hayri Kozanoğlu
2014	59,842	0.13%	1	Alper Taş-Bilge Seçkin Çetinkaya
2019	Did not contest			
2024	72,124	0.16%	2	Önder İşleyen

== Gallery ==
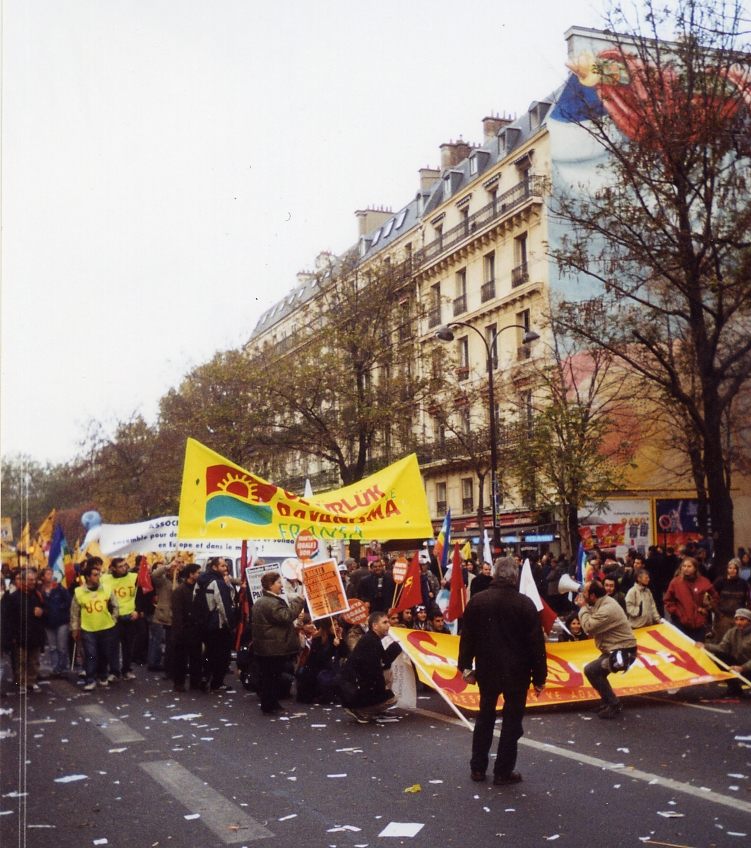
ÖDP France branch rallyists at the 2003 European Social Forum in Paris

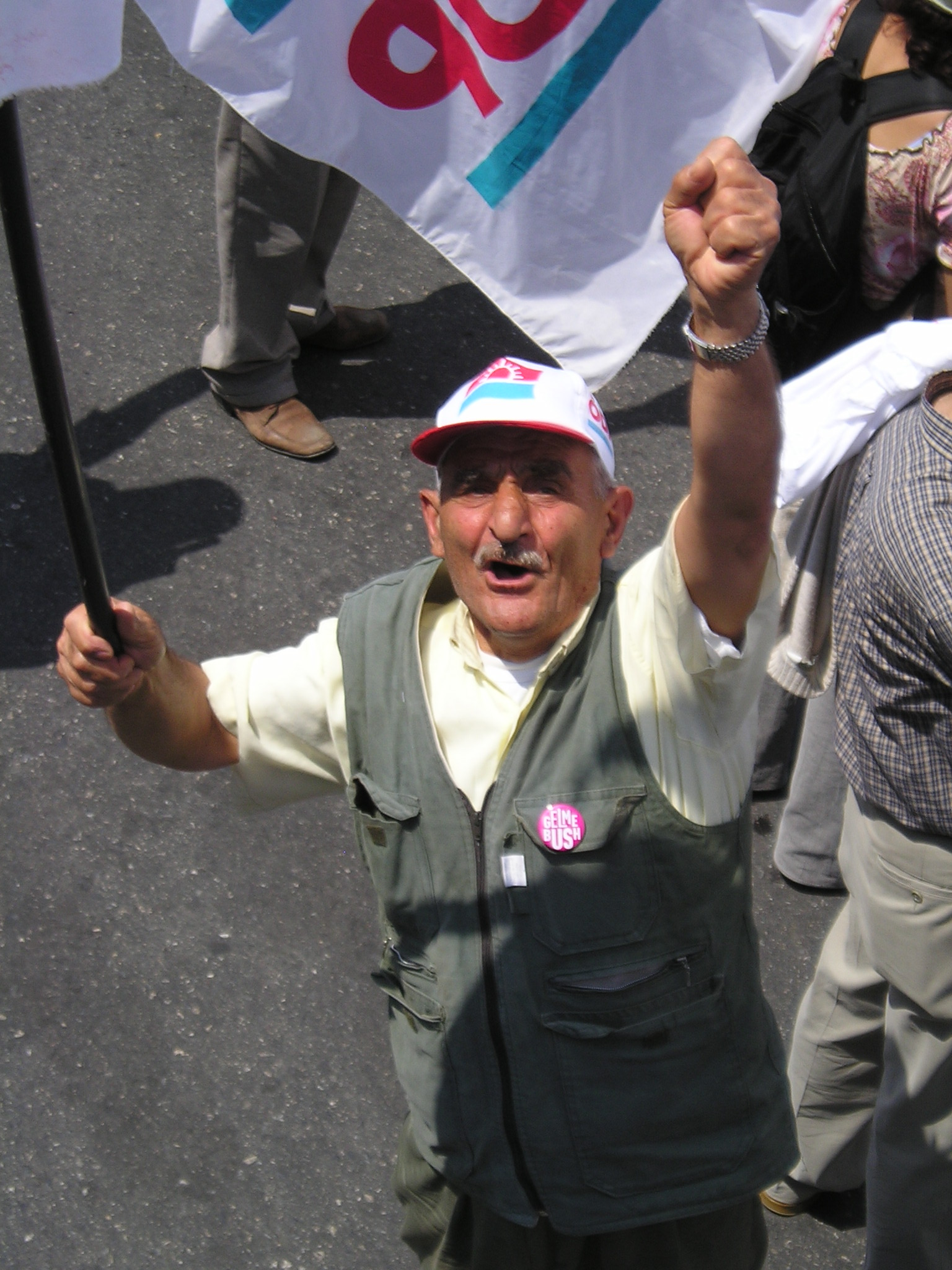
ÖDP supporter in demonstration against the 2004 NATO summit in Istanbul
