= Ottoman Party =

Ottoman Party Osmanlı Partisi
- Leader: Habip Geleş
- General Secretary: Ömer Geleş
- Founder: İbrahim Ünye
- Founded: August 31, 2016
- Split from: Great Unity Party
- Headquarters: Çankaya, Ankara
- Membership (2026): ▼2,265
- Ideology: Neo-Ottomanism; Islamism; Neo-fascism; Islamic nationalism
- Political position: Far-right
- National affiliation: Turkey Alliance
- Colors: Red, green, white
- Slogan: Lider Türkiye

Website
- http://osmanlipartisi.org.tr/

The Ottoman Party (Turkish: Osmanlı Partisi) is a neo-Ottomanist political party founded by İbrahim Ünye operating in Turkey. Its emblem is the Arabic letters Aleph and Waw on a crescent. Its chairman is Habip Geleş. The founder of the party, İbrahim Ünye, is a former Great Unity Party member and the former head of the Alperen Hearths Düzce provincial organization.

The Ottoman Party supported the Justice and Development Party and its leader Recep Tayyip Erdoğan in the 2018 Turkish presidential election. It joined the Turkey Alliance in 2023 and supported Ahmet Özal in the 2023 Turkish presidential election.
