= Communist Party of Turkey (modern) =

Marxist–Leninist communist party in Turkey

Communist Party of Turkey Türkiye Komünist Partisi
- Abbreviation: TKP
- Leader: Central committee
- General Secretary: Kemal Okuyan
- Founded: 16 August 1993 (founded); 11 November 2001 (renamed); 22 January 2017 (reinitiated)
- Headquarters: Ankara
- Newspaper: soL
- Student wing: Leftist High Schoolers
- Youth wing: Communist Youth of Turkey (Türkiye Komünist Gençliği)
- Membership (2026): ▼6,861
- Ideology: Communism; Marxism–Leninism; Laicism
- Political position: Far-left
- National affiliation: Union of Socialist Forces (2022–2023)
- European affiliation: INITIATIVE (until 2023); ECA (2023–)
- International affiliation: IMCWP
- Colors: Red, yellow, white
- Slogan: Boyun Eğme! ("Do not submit!")
- Grand National Assembly: 0 / 600
- Metropolitan municipalities: 0 / 30
- District municipalities: 0 / 1,351
- Provincial councillors: 0 / 1,282
- Municipal Assemblies: 9 / 20,952

Website
- www.TKP.org.tr

The Communist Party of Turkey (Turkish: Türkiye Komünist Partisi, TKP) is a Marxist-Leninist party in Turkey. Tracing its political lineage and historical continuity to the foundational tradition of the 1920 Communist Party of Turkey established by Mustafa Suphi, the modern organization was founded as the Socialist Power Party (Turkish: Sosyalist İktidar Partisi, SİP) on 16 August 1993. In 2001, the party changed its name to the Communist Party of Turkey (TKP).

== History ==
The lineage of the modern TKP is rooted in the political and theoretical splits within the Turkish socialist movement during the late 1970s. In 1978, a Leninist fraction operating within the Workers' Party of Turkey (TİP)—referring to itself as Sosyalist İktidar ("Socialist Power") and led by figures such as Metin Çulhaoğlu & Yalçın Küçük—severed its ties with the party leadership. This separation was driven by a rejection of growing reformist deviations, cross-class adaptation, and a dilution of revolutionary working-class perspectives within the official structure, claiming that the TİP should be defending socialist revolution beyond the limits of bourgeois parliamentary politics within the official structure. They argued that due to the oppressive atmosphere in the country, the party gave in to a unification policy within the left wing, thus losing the perspective of coming to power. The fraction published the Sosyalist İktidar magazine between 1978 and 1980.

=== Post-1980 Coup and the Gelenek Movement ===
In the political reaction following the 1980 military coup, the activities of the group faced heavy suppression, as nearly all other parties and political groups, leading to a period of underground regroupment and intensive theoretical consolidation. The cadres who gathered around the Sosyalist İktidar magazine took the form of an organization in 1982. During this process, ideological divergences emerged within the cadre; while Yalçın Küçük and his supporters pursued a separate path publishing "Toplumsal Kurtuluş," the core group led by Metin Çulhaoğlu launched the theoretical and political journal Gelenek ("Tradition") in 1986, with the claim of continuing the Marxist-Leninist tradition.

Amidst the ideological retreat accompanying the later dissolution of the Soviet Union, the Gelenek current carried out a rigorous process of theoretical reconstruction—resisting all forms of class collaboration and laying the direct political foundations for the establishment of the modern party. Gelenek defined the left in three categories as; orthodox, Revolutionary Democratic and new. From this perspective, it defended the orthodox left view and openly criticized trends such as Mikhail Gorbachev's Glasnost and Perestroika processes in the USSR.

During this period, the Gelenek movement announced that it would not support any system-internal political party in the 1987 General Elections, instead cooperating with other left-wing groups to campaign for independent parliamentary candidates. The group entered into negotiations for building a left-wing party where all revolutionary factions may be brought together, but this process failed. After the collapse of these talks, the Gelenek circle founded the Socialist Turkey Party ("Sosyalist Türkiye Partisi") in Ankara on November 6, 1992, structured around a collective political bureau. The Political Bureau of the party was made up of seven people: Ali Önder Öndeş, Kemal Okuyan, Metin Çulhaoğlu, Süleyman Baba, Uğur Özdemir, Işıtan Gündüz, Aydemir Güler. However, citing provisions within its party program, the STP was closed down on November 30, 1993 by the order of the Constitutional Court. 'The Gelenek journal continued its monthly theoretical publication uninterrupted.

=== SİP era (1993–2001) ===
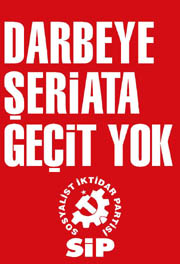
"No way out for coup or sharia"

Anticipating these suppression and liquidation attempts and securing the continuity of the struggle on the legal front, the Socialist Power Party ("Sosyalist İktidar Partisi") had already been established shortly before, on August 16, 1993. That same year, the party underwent an internal ideological debate that resulted in the departure of Metin Çulhaoğlu and a group of cadres. Following this restructuring, the party leadership was assumed by Aydemir Güler.

During the December 1995 general elections, the party had no right to enter the elections. SİP entered the Labour, Peace and Freedom Bloc headed by HADEP. After the election, the party had urged the participants to proceed with the bloc; however, the components refused to further collaborate with Kurdish nationalists. SİP had led the 1996 Istanbul University occupation and sit-in acts protesting the fees. The party had also made its name heads by holding an unannounced meeting in the banned Taksim Square on May Day 1996. After the exposure of the Susurluk scandal, the party encouraged the masses to take to the streets for protesting the regime that had connections with politicians-mobs-drug dealers etc. In the same year the party started a campaign that demanded the closure of the McDonald's in the Middle East Technical University Campus, Ankara.

In 1999, SİP entered the general elections for the first time under the leadership of Aydemir Güler and received 37,680 votes (0.12%). During the campaign process for the general elections party member Hüseyin Duman was shot dead by a rightist politician İhsan Bal.

In 2000, SİP emphasized on the ban on founding a party with "communist" adjective on its name. Thus party member Yalçın Cerit had applied to the authorities and found a new party called Communist Party (Komünist Parti). In spite of the law forbidding to form a party with the word "communist" in the name no legal steps were taken by the officials while SİP party members organised activities with both party names.

=== Founding of TKP and onwards (starting with 2001) ===
During the 6th Extraordinary Congress of SİP which was held on 11 November 2001, the party decided to make a new breakthrough. It was announced that Communist Party merged with the Party for Socialist Power and that the name of the party had been changed to the Communist Party of Turkey (Türkiye Komünist Partisi). Despite the fact that it was still forbidden to establish a party with the communist name, the party managed to successfully push back against legal attacks. With this congress, the TKP incorporated cadres from different organizational backgrounds, including the followers of Metin Çulhaoğlu, thus ending the disconnect in the history of the communist movement. The Central Committee was formed with the following: Aydemir Güler, Kemal Okuyan, Süleyman Baba, Uğur İşlek, Erkin Özalp, Hüseyin Karabulut, Kurtuluş Kılçer, Oğuz Kavala, Hüsnü Atlıkan, Yalçın Cerit, Mesut Odman, Gülay Dinçel, Alper Dizdar, Gamze Erbil, Mehmet Kuzulugil, Yaşar Çelik, Nihal İmeryüz, Tunç Tatoğlu, Sedat Cengiz, Haluk İmeryüz, Arif Basa, Atilla Gökçek. Aydemir Güler was selected as President and Kemal Okuyan as General Secretary. The foundation date of the party was declared as 10 September 1920 Baku Congress.

TKP broke the censorship against communists and participated in elections under its own name for the first time in 2002.

During this period some of the main campaigns and achievements of the party were:

- Rallying against the Iraq War when possible Turkish involvement was voted against on 1 March 2003. The resolution would have paved the way for relocation of US troops in Turkish soil and possible involvement of Turkish troops in Iraqi operations.
- Founding of Committees against invasion and Peace Foundation.
- Campaigning against the 2004 NATO Summit in İstanbul
- Founding of Patriotic Front (Yurtsever Cephe) against growing influence of imperialism
- Holding a mass rally against the AKP Government in 2008 in Kadıköy, İstanbul
- The Party entered 2011 General Elections and received 61,236 votes (0.14%).
- The Party played a pivotal role in the 2009–2010 Tekel workers' industrial action and 2013 Gezi Park protests

=== 2014 local elections ===
In the 2014 local elections, TKP had 51,155 votes and 0.11% of the votes across Turkey. Fatih Mehmet Maçoğlu was elected the mayor in Ovacık district of Tunceli province.

=== Dissolution and reconstruction ===
After a period of internal strife, two rival factions of TKP reached a consensus on 15 July 2014 to freeze the activities of the party and that neither faction shall use the name and emblem of TKP. The faction led by Erkan Baş and Metin Çulhaoğlu adopted the name People's Communist Party of Turkey and the faction led by Kemal Okuyan and Aydemir Güler founded the Communist Party.

On 22 January 2017, a congress was held by the initiative of seven well-known figures in the left-wing politics. The congress was embraced by independent communists and also by the Communist Party. The congress announced that the TKP name will not be left unguarded and declared that TKP is back in the political scene.

=== 2019 local elections ===
In the municipal election of 31 March 2019, TKP's candidate Fatih Mehmet Maçoğlu won in the mainly Zaza Kurdish Tunceli Province, with 32% of the votes cast. The Kurdish opposition party, the People's Democratic Party, came second with 28%, followed by the social democratic and Kemalist Republican People's Party at 20%.

=== 2023 general elections ===
In the general election of 2023, TKP ran independently, within the alliance of the Union of Socialist Forces.

=== 2024 local elections ===
In the local election of 2024, TKP ran candidates in many precincts, most notably Fatih Mehmet Maçoğlu in the precinct of Kadıköy, Istanbul, who had been the mayor of Tunceli prior.

== Organisational structure ==
The structure of the party is based on democratic centralism, as are conventional Marxist–Leninist Communist Parties. The basic unit is called cell, and the party has various cells in workshops, plants, neighbourhoods. These cells form the basis of district committees and eventually city committees. The deciding organ of the party is Party conference where delegates from every organisation determine the Central Committee which has the authority between congresses. The Central Committee determines within itself a General Secretary whose responsibilities are; making sure that the Central Committee works are coordinated, the political and organisational activities of the party are guided closely and representing the party in national and international platforms.

== Relations with other parties and internationalism ==
The party sees AKP, CHP, MHP and DEM Party as bourgeois parties and classifies them as opposing class parties. The party has warm relations with the Federation of Socialist Assemblies (Sosyalist Meclisler Federasyonu), and the two organisations formed an electoral alliance in several provinces in the 2019 Turkish local elections, which emerged victorious in the provincial centre of Tunceli.

In August 2022, it was announced in a press conference in Ankara, that the party along with the Left Party, the Communist Movement of Turkey and the Movement of Revolution (tr) would form a coalition for the 2023 national election, called the Union of Socialist Forces.

The party defends an orthodox view in communist movement and urges the movement to define its borders clearly. The party is quite close to the Communist Party of Greece (KKE) and the Communist Party of the Workers of Spain (PCTE) in international level, which are both founding members of the European Communist Action (ECA), of which TKP is also a founding member. TKP had relations with the parties of the ECA before its founding, in the framework of the European Communist Initiative which dissolved in 2023. It has ties with many communist and worker's parties in the Middle East, Caucasus and Balkans. It has close relations with the Communist Party of Cuba (PCC), leading a pioneer role in the solidarity for Cuba. The party joins the efforts to build an international focal point by issuing a magazine about communist theory called International Communist Review (ICR). TKP's youth wing, Communist Youth of Turkey and Leftist High Schoolers, are members of the World Federation of Democratic Youth.

TKP participates in the International Meetings of Communist and Workers' Parties (IMCWPs) and hosted the 21st and 23rd IMCWPs in 2019 and 2023 respectively, in İzmir, Turkey, the former alongside the KKE.

== Electoral performance ==
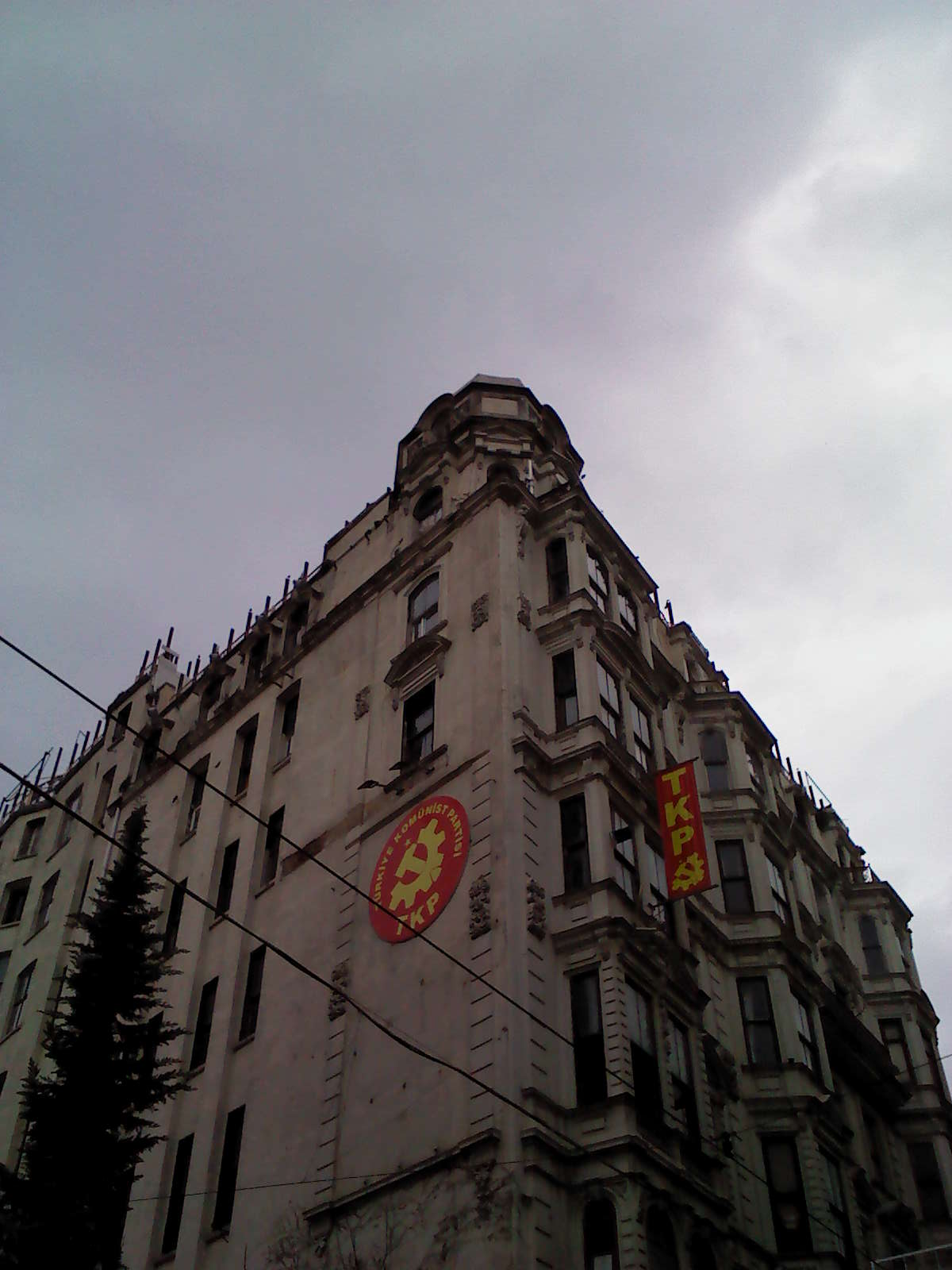
Party office in Istanbul

Election	Number of votes for TKP	Share of votes	Seats
1999 General Election	37,671	0,12%	0 / 550
2002 General Election	50,496	0,19%	0 / 550
2007 General Election	80,092	0,22%	0 / 550
2011 General Election	64,006	0,15%	0 / 550
2023 General Election	63,509	0,12%	0 / 600

== See also ==
- Communist Party of Turkey (disambiguation)
