= Communist Party (Turkey, 2014) =

Communist Party Komünist Parti
- Leader: Erkan Yıldız
- Presidium: Central Committee
- Founded: 17 July 2014
- Split from: Communist Party of Turkey
- Membership (2024): ▼46
- Ideology: Communism; Marxism–Leninism
- Political position: Far-left
- National affiliation: United June Movement
- European affiliation: INITIATIVE (2014-2017)
- International affiliation: IMCWP (2014-2017)
- Colours: Red, yellow, white
- Anthem: The Internationale

Website
- www.kp.org.tr

Communist Party (Turkish: Komünist Parti, or KP) is a Marxist-Leninist party in Turkey founded in 2014.

== Development ==
Following a period of internal strife within the then-defunct Communist Party of Turkey (TKP), the party decided to split in two. On 15 July 2014, the two rival factions reached a consensus to freeze the activities of the former party and that neither faction shall use the name and emblem of TKP. The faction led by Kemal Okuyan and Aydemir Güler founded the Communist Party on 17 July 2014, with the other faction forming the People's Communist Party of Turkey (HTKP).

== Electoral performance ==
Election	Number of votes for KP	Share of votes	Seats
General election, June 2015	13,780	0.03%	0 / 550
General election, November 2015	52,527	0.11%	0 / 550
