= People's Communist Party of Turkey =

People's Communist Party of Turkey Halkın Türkiye Komünist Partisi
- Abbreviation: HTKP
- Leader: Umut Kuruç
- Presidium: Central Committee
- Spokesperson: Erkan Baş
- Founded: July 13, 2014
- Dissolved: November 7, 2017
- Split from: Communist Party of Turkey
- Succeeded by: Workers' Party of Turkey
- Headquarters: Istanbul, Turkey
- Newspaper: İleri!
- Ideology: Communism; Marxism–Leninism
- Political position: Far-left
- National affiliation: United June Movement

People's Communist Party of Turkey (Turkish: Halkın Türkiye Komünist Partisi, HTKP) was a communist party in Turkey founded in 2014.

== Formation ==
Following a period of internal strife within the Communist Party of Turkey (TKP), the party decided to split in two. The faction led by Erkan Baş and Metin Çulhaoğlu founded the People's Communist Party of Turkey on 13 July 2014, with the other faction forming the Communist Party (KP). On 15 July 2014, the two rival factions reached a consensus to freeze the activities of the former party and that neither faction shall use the name and emblem of TKP. The TKP has since been re-established.
