= United June Movement =

- Founded: 19 October 2014
- Ideology: Communism; Marxism-Leninism; Anti-capitalism; Minority; Trotskyism; Libertarian socialism
- Political position: Left-wing to far-left

Website
- http://birlesikhaziranhareketi.org/

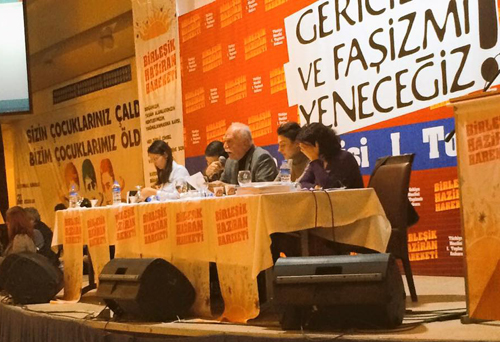
First meeting of Assembly of Turkey, 27–28 December 2014, Ankara.

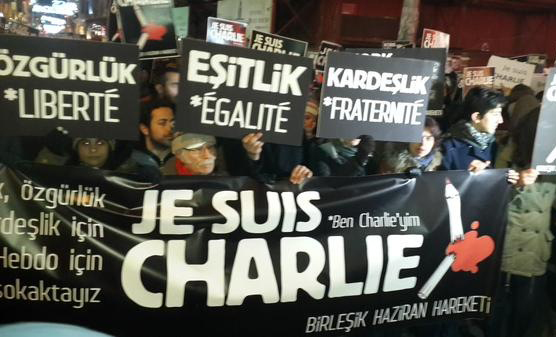
The United June Movement protesting the Charlie Hebdo shootings in Istanbul, 2015.

The United June Movement (Turkish: Birleşik Haziran Hareketi, BHH) was a political coalition bringing together left-wing, communist and socialist parties, Marxist–Leninist political organizations, independent individuals and various left-wing non-governmental organizations in Turkey.

BHH was defined as anti-capitalist, anti-imperialist, anti-fascist and anti-reactionary political alliance by the founders of the movement. The June Movement comprised a broad array of groups and political parties including the Freedom and Solidarity Party, the Communist Party, the People's Communist Party of Turkey, the Labourist Movement Party, the Socialist Liberation Party (formerly known as the Communist Party of Turkey 1920) and the Revolutionary Movement.

The United June Movement emerged in the wake of Turkey's 2013 Gezi Park Protest as a left- wing activist and political coalition.

In February 2015, HDP honorary president and HDK co-spokesperson Ertuğrul Kürkçü approached the United June Movement with a proposal to contest the June 2015 general election as a joint list.

== See also ==
- Peoples' Democratic Congress
- Peoples' United Revolutionary Movement
