= Kemal Okuyan =

Turkish communist politician

General Secretary Kemal Okuyan
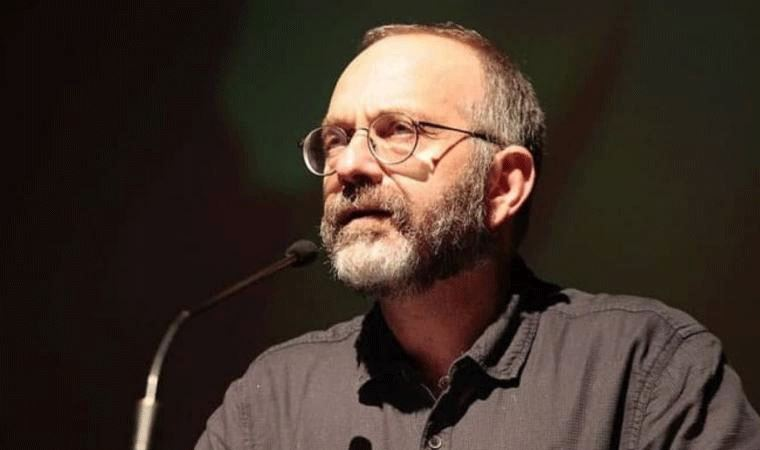

General Secretary of Communist Party of Turkey
- Incumbent
- Assumed office 2001-present
- Preceded by: Aydemir Güler

Member of Communist Party of Turkey Central Committee

Personal details
- Born: 1962 (age 63–64) United States
- Party: TKP
- Occupation: Politician

Kemal Okuyan (born 18 May 1962) is the General Secretary of the Communist Party of Turkey (TKP).

== Youth ==
On May 18, 1962, he was born in the United States, where his mother, Prof. Dr. Melahat Okuyan, was working in the healthcare field. Later, Melahat Okuyan and her husband, Muhsin Akça Okuyan, who would make significant contributions to microbiology and the fight against AIDS in Turkey decided to return to Turkey, and their child moved to Ankara before turning one.

== Political life ==
He started his political activities in the Workers' Party of Turkey. After criticising the party's politics based on national democratic revolution, he took part in a splinter group formed around the journal Socialist Power (Sosyalist İktidar) and he was among the first writers of the journal. After the 1980 Turkish coup d'état this group ceased to work. In 1986 he and his comrades founded the Gelenek journal around which they formed the nucleus of a traditional communist party.

In the early 1990s, Okuyan and his comrades founded the Socialist Turkey Party. This party was banned by the Constitutional Court of Turkey in 1993. That year, they founded the Socialist Power Party. This party changed its name to the Communist Party of Turkey (TKP) following the 2001 Congress. After the TKP split in 2014, he resigned as general secretary and founded the Communist Party with Aydemir Güler. Okuyan was elected general secretary of the Central Committee after the Communist Party of Turkey was rebuilt in 2017.

== Works ==
He is a columnist in the soL Portal, a leftist newspaper portal. He also wrote many books about political events in Turkey and former Marxist–Leninist states. His works have been influential on the Turkish left.

=== Books ===
- Texts Against Democracy (Demokrasiye Aykırı Yazılar)
- What Does The Soldiers' Party Want? (Asker Partisi Ne İstiyor?)
- Civic Society: Development of the State (Sivil Toplum: Devletin Büyümesi)
- Understanding Stalin (Stalin'i Anlamak)
- Socialism's Search for Power in Turkey (Türkiye'de Sosyalizmin İktidar Arayışı)
- The Book of What Is To Be Done-ists (Ne Yapmalı'cılar Kitabı)
- Theory of Socialist Revolution (Sosyalist Devrim Teorisi)
- Anti-Theses on the Dissolution of the Soviet Union (Sovyetler Birliği'nin Çözülüşü Üzerine Anti-Tezler)
- The Left Stuck Between Ergenekon and AKP (Ergenekon ve AKP Arasında Sıkışan Sol)
- The Patriotism Exam of The Left in Turkey (Türkiye Solunun Yurtseverlik Sınavı)
- In The Shadow of Revolution: Berlin-Warsaw-Ankara 1920 (Devrimin Gölgesinde: Berlin-Varşova-Ankara 1920)

=== Articles ===
- Thinking aloud on the "World Communist Movement"
- Development of Anti-communism in Turkey during the “Foundation” period
- October Revolution and the Vanguard Party – Some historical and theoretical conclusions
- The 100th year of a party pursuing revolution
- The Speech of Khrushchev at the 20th Congress of the CPSU: Socialism rendered defenceless
