= Socialist Workers' Party of Turkey =

Socialist Workers' Party of Turkey Türkiye Sosyalist İşçi Partisi
- Abbreviation: TSİP
- President: Turgut Koçak
- Founded: 16 June 1974 (historical); 3 January 1993 (legal)
- Preceded by: Workers Party of Turkey
- Headquarters: Ankara
- Membership (2026): ▲166
- Ideology: Communism; Marxism–Leninism; Stalinism; Anti-revisionism
- Political position: Far-left
- Slogan: Faşizme Karşı Demokrasi. Sömürüye ve Kapitalizme Karşı Sosyalizm. (Democracy against fascism. Socialism against exploitation and capitalism.)
- Anthem: The Internationale

The Socialist Workers' Party of Turkey (Turkish: Türkiye Sosyalist İşçi Partisi, TSİP) is an anti-revisionist Marxist–Leninist communist party in Turkey.

The Socialist Workers' Party of Turkey was founded on 16 June 1974, but the party was closed following the 1980 coup. The TSİP was reestablished on 3 January 1993 by old members of the party.

== See also ==
- List of anti-revisionist groups
