= Bolu (electoral district) =

Electoral district for the Grand National Assembly of Turkey

Coordinates: 37°50′N 34°45′E

- electoral district for the Grand National Assembly of Turkey
- Bolu shown within Turkey
- Province: Bolu
- Electorate: 200,401

Current electoral district
- Created: 1923
- Seats: 3 Historical: 5 (1999)
- MPs: List: Ali Ercoşkun AKP Fehmi Küpçü AKP Tanju Özcan CHP
- Turnout at last election: 89.90%
- Representation
- AK Party: 2 / 3
- CHP: 1 / 3

Bolu is an electoral district of the Grand National Assembly of Turkey. It elects three members of parliament (deputies) to represent the province of the same name for a four-year term by the D'Hondt method, a party-list proportional representation system.

== Members ==
Population reviews of each electoral district are conducted before each general election, which can lead to certain districts being granted a smaller or greater number of parliamentary seats. With one of the smallest electorates of any province, Gümüşhane has consistently returned two MPs since the 1999 general election.

In 1999, Düzce in northern Bolu became a province in its own right, thereby receiving its own electoral district for the 2002 general election and electing its Members of Parliament in its own right. The number of MPs elected in Bolu therefore fell from five to three in 2002, while the newly created Düzce electoral district elects three MPs. Both Düzce and Bolu combined therefore gained one extra seat in 2002.

MPs for Bolu, 1999 onwards
Election	2002 (22nd Parliament)	2007 (23rd Parliament)	2011 (24th Parliament)	June 2015 (25th Parliament)	November 2015 (26th Parliament)
MP	Yüksel Coşkunyürek; AK Party		Ali Ercoşkun; AK Party		
MP	Mehmet Güner; AK Party	Fatih Metin; AK Party	Fehmi Küpçü; AK Party		
MP	Metin Yılmaz; AK Party		Tanju Özcan; CHP		

== General elections ==
=== 2011 ===
2011 general election: Bolu
Party	Candidate	Votes	%	±%
AK Party	2 elected ▼1: 1. Ali Ercoşkun ✓; 2. Fehmi Küpçü ✓; 3. Fatih Metin ✗	103,908	58.50	▲3.61
CHP	1 elected ▲1: 1. Tanju Özcan ✓; 2. Mehtap Özcan Mısıroğlu ✗; 3. Hakkı Fidan ✗	35,611	20.05	▲5.37
MHP	None elected: 1. Murat Yapıcı ✗; 2. Şerafettin Doğan ✗; 3. Mehmet Faruk Yazgan ✗	28,591	16.10	▼3.92
SAADET	None elected: 1. Hayrettin Aytar ✗; 2. İsmail Yıldırım ✗; 3. Muhammed Yekerek ✗	2,704	1.52	▼2.09
DP	None elected: 1. İsmail Özpek ✗; 2. Sebihe Kılıç ✗; 3. Filiz Koç ✗	1,848	1.04	▼5.58
HAS Party	None elected: 1. Erol Gülen ✗; 2. Fatma Çakır ✗; 3. Hüseyin Aydın ✗	1,323	0.74	▲0.74
Büyük Birlik	None elected: 1. Hasan Yağın ✗; 2. Şerafettin Doğan ✗; 3. Mehmet Faruk Yazgan ✗	929	0.52	▲0.52
HEPAR	None elected: 1. Habib Arslan ✗; 2. Meşküre Kaya ✗; 3. Hülya Özdemir ✗	726	0.41	▲0.41
DYP	None elected: 1. Şinasi Kurt ✗; 2. Tekin Ezercan ✗; 3. Mehmet Tevfiz Kaymaz ✗	497	0.28	▲0.28
DSP	None elected: 1. İsmail Özpek ✗; 2. Sebihe Kılıç ✗; 3. Mehmet Narin ✗	403	0.23	N/A
Labour	None elected: 1. Ahmet Özkan ✗; 2. Faruk Güneş ✗; 3. Musa Nuri Gündoğdu ✗	402	0.23	▼0.04
Nationalist Conservative	None elected: 1. Cevdet Satır ✗; 2. Orhan Ağsakallı ✗; 3. Ferhat Aydemir ✗	201	0.11	▲0.11
MP	None elected: 1. Latif Ural ✗; 2. Muammer İpek ✗; 3. Kadriye Ural ✗	171	0.10	▲0.10
TKP	None elected: 1. Güner Yavuz ✗; 2. Nevzat Evrim Önal ✗; 3. Mehmet Yaşar ✗	167	0.09	▼0.23
Liberal Democrat	None elected: 1. Ahmet Yılmaz ✗; 2. Erol Başkurt ✗; 3. Adnan Özyurt ✗	132	0.07	▼0.17
Total votes		177,613	100.00	
Rejected ballots		2,540	1.41	▲0.56
Turnout		180,153	89.90	▲0.14

=== June 2015 ===
Abbr.	Party	Votes	%
AK Party	Justice and Development Party	95,752	52%
CHP	Republican People's Party	45,313	24.6%
MHP	Nationalist Movement Party	29,635	16.1%
SP	Felicity Party	6,560	3.6%
HDP	Peoples' Democratic Party	3,069	1.7%
	Other	3,823	2.1%
Total		184,152	
Turnout		88.28	
source: YSK

=== November 2015 ===
Abbr.	Party	Votes	%
AK Party	Justice and Development Party	117,527	62.8%
CHP	Republican People's Party	40,307	21.5%
MHP	Nationalist Movement Party	20,352	10.9%
SP	Felicity Party	2,125	1.1%
HDP	Peoples' Democratic Party	2,044	1.1%
	Other	4,734	2.5%
Total		187,089	
Turnout		89.26	
source: YSK

=== 2018 ===
Abbr.	Party	Votes	%
AK Party	Justice and Development Party	100,154	51.2%
CHP	Republican People's Party	39,527	20.2%
MHP	Nationalist Movement Party	29,100	14.9%
IYI	Good Party	16,842	8.6%
HDP	Peoples' Democratic Party	3,140	1.6%
SP	Felicity Party	2,998	1.5%
	Other	3,814	2%
Total		195,575	
Turnout		89.79	
source: YSK

== Presidential elections ==
=== 2014 ===
2014 presidential election: Bolu
Party	Candidate	Votes	%
AK Party	Recep Tayyip Erdoğan	112,055	66.13
Independent	Ekmeleddin İhsanoğlu	54,659	32.26
HDP	Selahattin Demirtaş	2,721	1.61
Total votes		169,435	100.00
Rejected ballots		3,713	2.14
Turnout		173,148	83.17
Recep Tayyip Erdoğan win			
