= Bilecik (electoral district) =

Electoral district for the Grand National Assembly of Turkey

Coordinates: 37°50′N 34°45′E

- electoral district for the Grand National Assembly of Turkey
- Bilecik shown within Turkey
- Province: Bilecik
- Electorate: 142,789

Current electoral district
- Created: 1923
- Seats: 2
- Turnout at last election: 92.00%
- Representation
- AK Party: 1 / 2
- CHP: 1 / 2

Bilecik is an electoral district of the Grand National Assembly of Turkey. It elects two members of parliament (deputies) to represent the province of the same name for a four-year term by the D'Hondt method, a party-list proportional representation system.

== Members ==
Population reviews of each electoral district are conducted before each general election, which can lead to certain districts being granted a smaller or greater number of parliamentary seats. As one of the smallest electoral districts, Bilecik has consistently elected two MPs since 1999.

MPs for Bilecik, 1999 onwards
Election	2002 (22nd Parliament)	2007 (23rd Parliament)	2011 (24th Parliament)	June 2015 (25th Parliament)	November 2015 (26th Parliament)
MP	Fahrettin Poyraz; AK Party			Halil Eldemir; AK Party	
MP	Yaşar Tüzün; CHP		Bahattin Şeker; MHP	Yaşar Tüzün; CHP	

== General elections ==
=== 2011 ===
2011 general election: Bilecik
Party	Candidate	Votes	%	±%
AK Party	1 elected 0: 1. Fahrettin Poyraz ✓; 2. Halil Eldemir ✗	54,936	42.59	▲2.62
MHP	1 elected ▲1: 1. Bahattin Şeker ✓; 2. Bahaettin Bulut ✗	35,117	27.23	▲9.34
CHP	None elected ▼1: 1. Yaşar Tüzün ✗; 2. Ali Olcay ✗	32,741	25.38	▲2.14
SAADET	None elected: 1. İbrahim Meral ✗; 2. Turgay Ordu ✗	1,773	1.37	▼2.63
HAS Party	None elected: 1. Muharrem Tüfekçioğlu ✗; 2. Recep Fidan ✗	1,348	1.05	▲1.05
DP	None elected: 1. Nurhan Güner ✗; 2. Neccar Katırancı ✗	966	0.75	▼6.94
Büyük Birlik	None elected: 1. Hasan Uslu ✗; 2. Hüseyin Hüsnü Avcı ✗	387	0.30	▲0.30
DYP	None elected: 1. Ömer Çoban ✗; 2. Murat Akbal ✗	362	0.28	▲0.28
HEPAR	None elected: 1. Filiz Özbırakmaz ✗; 2. Sevtap Yetiş ✗	339	0.26	▲0.26
Labour	None elected: 1. Çağdaş Yıldız ✗; 2. Sevcan Tekin ✗	302	0.23	▲0.07
DSP	None elected: 1. Rifat Yılmaz ✗; 2. Devrim Serin ✗	251	0.19	N/A
Nationalist Conservative	None elected: 1. Ali İpek ✗; 2. Hasan Emrah Turan ✗	146	0.11	▲0.11
MP	None elected: 1. Uğur Özdemir ✗; 2. Fevziye Şakar ✗	127	0.10	▲0.10
TKP	None elected: 1. Erdem Tuç ✗; 2. Onur Terzi ✗	127	0.10	▼0.02
Liberal Democrat	None elected: 1. Gültekin Sirkeci ✗; 2. Rıdvan Sirkeci ✗	63	0.05	▼0.11
Total votes		128,985	100.00	
Rejected ballots		2,388	1.82	▲0.83
Turnout		131,373	92.00	▲0.76

=== June 2015 ===
Abbr.	Party	Votes	%
AKP	Justice and Development Party	49,172	37.3%
CHP	Republican People's Party	38,833	29.5%
MHP	Nationalist Movement Party	34,006	25.8%
HDP	Peoples' Democratic Party	4,349	3.3%
SP	Felicity Party	2,886	2.2%
	Other	2,589	2%
Total		131,835	
Turnout		90.48	
source: YSK

=== November 2015 ===
Abbr.	Party	Votes	%
AKP	Justice and Development Party	61,338	46.3%
CHP	Republican People's Party	44,792	33.8%
MHP	Nationalist Movement Party	18,596	14%
HDP	Peoples' Democratic Party	3,219	2.4%
SP	Felicity Party	1,216	0.9%
	Other	3,283	2.5%
Total		132,444	
Turnout		90.39	
source: YSK

=== 2018 ===
Abbr.	Party	Votes	%
AKP	Justice and Development Party	58,110	42.3%
CHP	Republican People's Party	38,807	28.3%
IYI	Good Party	19,656	14.3%
MHP	Nationalist Movement Party	12,666	9.2%
HDP	Peoples' Democratic Party	4,040	2.9%
SP	Felicity Party	1,539	1.1%
	Other	2,396	2%
Total		137,214	
Turnout		90.85	
source: YSK

== Presidential elections ==
=== 2014 ===
2014 presidential election: Bilecik
Party	Candidate	Votes	%
AK Party	Recep Tayyip Erdoğan	62,087	50.90
Independent	Ekmeleddin İhsanoğlu	56,170	46.05
HDP	Selahattin Demirtaş	3,710	3.04
Total votes		121,967	100.00
Rejected ballots		2,531	2.03
Turnout		124,498	84.15
Recep Tayyip Erdoğan win			
