= Çanakkale (electoral district) =

Electoral district for the Grand National Assembly of Turkey

Coordinates: 37°50′N 34°45′E

- electoral district for the Grand National Assembly of Turkey
- Çanakkale shown within Turkey
- Province: Çanakkale
- Electorate: 366,267

Current electoral district
- Created: 1923
- Seats: 4
- Turnout at last election: 91.00%
- Representation
- AK Party: 2 / 4
- CHP: 2 / 4

Çanakkale is an electoral district of the Grand National Assembly of Turkey. It elects four members of parliament (deputies) to represent the province of the same name for a four-year term by the D'Hondt method, a party-list proportional representation system.

== Members ==
Population reviews of each electoral district are conducted before each general election, which can lead to certain districts being granted a smaller or greater number of parliamentary seats. Çanakkale has consistently elected four MPs since 1999.

MPs for Çanakkale, 2002 onwards
Election	2002 (22nd Parliament)	2007 (23rd Parliament)	2011 (24th Parliament)	June 2015 (25th Parliament)	November 2015 (26th Parliament)
MP	Mehmet Daniş; AK Party			Bülent Turan; AK Party	
MP	İbrahim Köşdere; AK Party	Müjdat Kuşku; AK Party	İsmail Kaşdemir; AK Party	İbrahim Kürşat Tuna; MHP	Ayhan Gider; AK Party
MP	Ahmet Küçük; CHP		Ali Sarıbaş; CHP	Bülent Öz; CHP	
MP	İsmail Özay; CHP	Mustafa Kemal Cengiz; MHP	Mustafa Serder Soydan; CHP	Muharrem Erkek; CHP	

== General elections ==
=== 2011 ===
2011 general election: Çanakkale
Party	Candidate	Votes	%	±%
AK Party	2 elected 0: 1. Mehmet Daniş ✓; 2. İsmail Kaşdemir ✓; 3. Sebahattin Güner ✗; 4. Yeşim Karadağ ✗	136,367	41.57	▲6.22
CHP	2 elected ▲1: 1. Ali Sarıbaş ✓; 2. Mustafa Serdar Soydan ✓; 3. Bülent Öz ✗; 4. Ahmet Küçük ✗	129,445	39.46	▲13.78
MHP	None elected ▼1: 1. Füsun Koroğlu Çorapçıoğlu ✗; 2. Enver Koç ✗; 3. Mehmet Doğan ✗; 4. İbrahim Kürşat Tuna ✗	47,897	14.60	▼6.07
DP	None elected: 1. Bekir Duman ✗; 2. Selami Münir Duru ✗; 3. Levent Karesioğlu ✗; 4. Beytullah Yavaş ✗	3,936	1.20	▼6.29
Labour	None elected: 1. Mehmet Mustafa Yalçıner ✗; 2. Fatih Polat ✗; 3. Refret Hayriye Arı ✗; 4. Eylem Göl ✗	1,711	0.52	▲0.11
SAADET	None elected: 1. Şaban Sarı ✗; 2. Muharrem Hoşgör ✗; 3. Yusuf Hürşitoğlulları ✗; 4. Mustafa Algül ✗	1,586	0.48	▼0.45
HAS Party	None elected: 1. İbrahim Akkoyun ✗; 2. Mehmet Polar Küçükçelik ✗; 3. Mesude Kaya ✗; 4. Seçkin Gümüş ✗	1,527	0.47	▲0.47
HEPAR	None elected: 1. Niyazi Özer ✗; 2. İlhami Bartıcı ✗; 3. Kenan Tas ✗; 4. Bedri Şen ✗	1,261	0.38	▲0.38
DYP	None elected: 1. Mukadder Çetinel Gökgiray ✗; 2. Mahmut Nedim Aydın ✗; 3. Fırat Tireli ✗; 4. Hilmi Kılıç ✗	1,079	0.33	▲0.33
DSP	None elected: 1. Filiz Sanay ✗; 2. Ufuk Cankaya ✗; 3. Hüseyin Kavas ✗; 4. Remziye Vatansever ✗	1,015	0.31	N/A
Büyük Birlik	None elected: 1. Ethem Hırçın ✗; 2. Yaşar Çınar ✗; 3. Mustafa Melih Namıoğlu ✗; 4. Hüseyin Bilici ✗	740	0.23	▲0.23
TKP	None elected: 1. Mehmet Tezel ✗; 2. Berna Ersoy ✗; 3. Fikret Sezen ✗; 4. Tuluğ Ünlütürk ✗	439	0.13	▼0.07
Nationalist Conservative	None elected: 1. Yusuf Sarıbulut ✗; 2. Muharrem Öztürk ✗; 3. Gökhan Cenkiz ✗; 4. Nurten Aytemur ✗	331	0.10	▲0.10
MP	None elected: 1. Cahit Yılmaz ✗; 2. Alaattin Taras ✗; 3. Zakir Erdinç ✗; 4. Ayşen Özdemir ✗	323	0.10	▲0.10
Independent	None elected: Harun Özcan ✗	207	0.06	▼0.08
Liberal Democrat	None elected: 1. Mustafa Çetin Güçüşoğlu ✗; 2. Erdoğan Türesel ✗; 3. Bülent Kudal ✗; 4. Nalan Yar ✗	192	0.06	▲0.06
Total votes		328,056	100.00	
Rejected ballots		5,261	1.58	▲0.50
Turnout		333,317	91.00	▲0.06

=== June 2015 ===
Abbr.	Party	Votes	%
CHP	Republican People's Party	134,508	39.5%
AKP	Justice and Development Party	116,367	34.2%
MHP	Nationalist Movement Party	68,089	20%
HDP	Peoples' Democratic Party	9,106	2.7%
	Other	12,098	3.6%
Total		340,168	
Turnout		89.47%	
source: YSK

=== November 2015 ===
Abbr.	Party	Votes	%
AKP	Justice and Development Party	135,609	39.8%
CHP	Republican People's Party	134,957	39.6%
MHP	Nationalist Movement Party	53,207	15.6%
HDP	Peoples' Democratic Party	7,090	2.1%
	Other	10,275	3%
Total		341,138	
Turnout		89.07%	
source: YSK

=== 2018 ===
Abbr.	Party	Votes	%
AKP	Justice and Development Party	131,900	36.4%
CHP	Republican People's Party	123,725	34.1%
IYI	Good Party	61,873	17.1%
MHP	Nationalist Movement Party	24,648	6.8%
HDP	Peoples' Democratic Party	12,069	3.3%
	Other	8,623	2.4%
Total		362,838	
Turnout		91.21%	
source: YSK

== Presidential elections ==
=== 2014 ===
2014 presidential election: Çanakkale
Party	Candidate	Votes	%
Independent	Ekmeleddin İhsanoğlu	176,707	55.37
AK Party	Recep Tayyip Erdoğan	133,708	41.90
HDP	Selahattin Demirtaş	8,718	2.73
Total votes		319,133	100.00
Rejected ballots		5,634	1.73
Turnout		324,767	83.88
Ekmeleddin İhsanoğlu win			
