= Bartın (electoral district) =

Electoral district for the Grand National Assembly of Turkey

Coordinates: 37°50′N 34°45′E

- electoral district for the Grand National Assembly of Turkey
- Bartın shown within Turkey
- Province: Bartın
- Electorate: 140,076

Current electoral district
- Created: 1991
- Seats: 2
- Turnout at last election: 88.31%
- Representation
- AK Party: 1 / 2
- CHP: 1 / 2

Bartın is an electoral district of the Grand National Assembly of Turkey. It elects two members of parliament (deputies) to represent the province of the same name for a four-year term by the D'Hondt method, a party-list proportional representation system.

== Members ==
Population reviews of each electoral district are conducted before each general election, which can lead to certain districts being granted a smaller or greater number of parliamentary seats. Bartın became an electoral district for the 1991 general election and has continuously elected two MPs.

MPs for Bartın, 1999 onwards
| Election | 2002 (22nd Parliament) | 2007 (23rd Parliament) | 2011 (24th Parliament) | June 2015 (25th Parliament) | November 2015 (26th Parliament) |
| MP | Hacı İbrahim Kabarık; AK Party | Yılmaz Tunç; AK Party | | | |
| MP | Mehmet Asım Kulak; AK Party | Muhammet Rıza Yalçınkaya; CHP | | | |

== General elections ==
=== 2011 ===
2011 general election: Bartın
| Party | Candidate | Votes | % | ±% |
|---|---|---|---|---|
| AK Party | 1 elected 0: 1. Yılmaz Tunç ✓; 2. Seyfettin Kalay ✗ | 57,783 | 48.16 | ▲9.59 |
| CHP | 1 elected 0: 1. Muhammet Rıza Yalçınkaya ✓; 2. Meliha Okutay ✗ | 34,499 | 28.75 | ▲6.06 |
| MHP | None elected: 1. Sezai Bilgin ✗; 2. Avni Kabasakal ✗ | 19,189 | 15.99 | ▼5.69 |
| SAADET | None elected: 1. Mücahit Abdullah Mekeç ✗; 2. Ömer Keles ✗ | 2,951 | 2.45 | ▼0.02 |
| HAS Party | None elected: 1. Harun Gündoğan ✗; 2. Haydar Kenan Parlatır ✗ | 1,201 | 1.00 | ▲1.00 |
| DP | None elected: 1. Siyami Saraç ✗; 2. Hasan Ergin ✗ | 1,158 | 0.96 | ▼6.75 |
| DSP | None elected: 1. Fahri Güler ✗; 2. Yılmaz Gemici ✗ | 701 | 0.58 | N/A |
| DYP | None elected: 1. Ceyhun Aydın ✗; 2. Onur An ✗ | 423 | 0.35 | ▲0.35 |
| Labour | None elected: 1. Selvi Kılınçaslan ✗; 2. Zeynep Özkan ✗ | 417 | 0.34 | ▲0.02 |
| Büyük Birlik | None elected: 1. Ahmet Yalçın ✗; 2. Murat Gülmez ✗ | 393 | 0.32 | ▲0.32 |
| HEPAR | None elected: 1. Ertan Çolakoğlu ✗; 2. Yılmaz Öztürk ✗ | 384 | 0.32 | ▲0.32 |
| MP | None elected: 1. Mehmet Gümüşkaynak ✗; 2. Tülin Emrullah ✗ | 251 | 0.20 | ▲0.20 |
| Nationalist Conservative | None elected: 1. Cevdet Aldağ ✗; 2. Murat Karataş ✗ | 212 | 0.17 | ▲0.17 |
| TKP | None elected: 1. Hande Polat ✗; 2. Leyla Ezel Demirci ✗ | 206 | 0.17 | ▼0.08 |
| Liberal Democrat | None elected: 1. Hüseyin Yelki ✗; 2. Remzi Kanbur ✗ | 195 | 0.16 | ▼0.29 |
| Total votes | | 119,963 | 100.00 | |
| Rejected ballots | | 4,121 | 3.33 | ▲1.30 |
| Turnout | | 123,704 | 88.31 | ▲1.84 |

=== June 2015 ===
| Abbr. | Party | Votes | % |
|---|---|---|---|
| AK Party | Justice and Development Party | 49,600 | 41.5% |
| CHP | Republican People's Party | 36,526 | 30.5% |
| MHP | Nationalist Movement Party | 21,782 | 18.2% |
| SP | Felicity Party | 5,678 | 4.7% |
| HDP | Peoples' Democratic Party | 1,484 | 1.2% |
| | Other | 4,583 | 3.8% |
| Total | | 119,653 | |
| Turnout | | 86.71 | |
source: YSK

=== November 2015 ===
| Abbr. | Party | Votes | % |
|---|---|---|---|
| AK Party | Justice and Development Party | 63,965 | 53.3% |
| CHP | Republican People's Party | 36,208 | 30.2% |
| MHP | Nationalist Movement Party | 12,518 | 10.4% |
| SP | Felicity Party | 2,390 | 2% |
| HDP | Peoples' Democratic Party | 999 | 0.8% |
| | Other | 3,902 | 3.3% |
| Total | | 119,982 | |
| Turnout | | 86.17 | |
source: YSK

=== 2018 ===
| Abbr. | Party | Votes | % |
|---|---|---|---|
| AK Party | Justice and Development Party | 56,620 | 46% |
| CHP | Republican People's Party | 31,404 | 25.5% |
| MHP | Nationalist Movement Party | 20,894 | 17% |
| IYI | Good Party | 7,199 | 5.8% |
| SP | Felicity Party | 2,639 | 2.1% |
| HDP | Peoples' Democratic Party | 1,502 | 1.2% |
| | Other | 2,837 | 2.3% |
| Total | | 123,095 | |
| Turnout | | 87.59 | |
source: YSK

== Presidential elections ==
=== 2014 ===
2014 presidential election: Bartın
| Party | Candidate | Votes | % |
|---|---|---|---|
| AK Party | Recep Tayyip Erdoğan | 63,612 | 57.71 |
| Independent | Ekmeleddin İhsanoğlu | 44,035 | 39.95 |
| HDP | Selahattin Demirtaş | 2,586 | 2.35 |
| Total votes | | 110,233 | 100.00 |
| Rejected ballots | | 4,056 | 3.55 |
| Turnout | | 114,289 | 80.08 |
| Recep Tayyip Erdoğan win | | | |
