= Çankırı (electoral district) =

Electoral district for the Grand National Assembly of Turkey

Coordinates: 37°50′N 34°45′E

- electoral district for the Grand National Assembly of Turkey
- Çankırı shown within Turkey
- Province: Çankırı
- Electorate: 129,013

Current electoral district
- Created: 1923
- Seats: 2 Historical: 3 (1999–2007)
- Turnout at last election: 87.35%
- Representation
- AK Party: 2 / 2

Çankırı is an electoral district of the Grand National Assembly of Turkey. It elects two members of parliament (deputies) to represent the province of the same name for a four-year term by the D'Hondt method, a party-list proportional representation system.

== Members ==
Population reviews of each electoral district are conducted before each general election, which can lead to certain districts being granted a smaller or greater number of parliamentary seats. Çankırı elected three MPs from 1999 up until the 2011 general election, after which the number of seats was reduced to two.

MPs for Çankırı, 2002 onwards
Election	2002 (22nd Parliament)	2007 (23rd Parliament)	2011 (24th Parliament)	June 2015 (25th Parliament)	November 2015 (26th Parliament)
MP	Tevfik Akbak; AK Party	Nurettin Akman; AK Party	Hüseyin Filiz; AK Party		
MP	İsmail Ericekli; AK Party	Suat Kınıklıoğlu; AK Party	İdris Şahin; AK Party	Muhammet Emin Akbaşoğlu; AK Party	
MP	Hikmet Özdemir; AK Party	Ahmet Bukan; MHP	No seat		

== General elections ==
=== 2011 ===
2011 general election: Çankırı
Party	Candidate	Votes	%	±%
AK Party	2 elected 0: 1. İdris Şahin ✓; 2. Hüseyin Filiz ✓	72,749	65.59	▲4.86
MHP	None elected ▼1: 1. Şahin Erarslan ✗; 2. Hüseyin Yakar ✗	25,607	23.09	▲1.51
CHP	None elected: 1. Muzaffer Cellat ✗; 2. Hasan Çelen ✗	6,738	6.08	▲0.71
SAADET	None elected: 1. Mehmet Ünver ✗; 2. Vehbi Aydoğan ✗	1,583	1.43	▼0.93
Büyük Birlik	None elected: 1. Murat Çitfçi ✗; 2. Durhan Pınarcı ✗	1,120	1.01	▲1.01
DP	None elected: 1. Ömer Sarıalioğlu ✗; 2. Ahmet Demirel ✗	970	0.87	▼4.29
HAS Party	None elected: 1. Fatih Hacıoğlu ✗; 2. Yaşar Er ✗	960	0.87	▲0.87
DYP	None elected: 1. Yunus Erşen ✗; 2. Ali Emre Yalçınkaya ✗	363	0.33	▲0.33
HEPAR	None elected: 1. Fatih Karaşahin ✗; 2. Erdem Çağlar ✗	197	0.18	▲0.18
Nationalist Conservative	None elected: 1. Şaban Yılmaz ✗; 2. Dursun Kaygaz ✗	190	0.17	▲0.17
DSP	None elected: 1. Namık Kaya ✗; 2. Bani Çağlar ✗	125	0.11	N/A
Labour	None elected: 1. Kemal Sunar ✗; 2. Güneş Kılıç ✗	117	0.11	▼0.12
TKP	None elected: 1. Mehmet Keskin ✗; 2. Emel Kanbur ✗	93	0.08	▼0.07
MP	None elected: 1. Yusuf Zaim ✗; 2. Edibali Erdem ✗	58	0.05	▲0.05
Liberal Democrat	None elected: 1. İbrahim Ulutaş ✗; 2. İlhan Gaygusuz ✗	40	0.04	▼0.17
Total votes		110,910	100.00	
Rejected ballots		2,130	1.82	▲0.76
Turnout		112,691	87.35	▲3.14

=== June 2015 ===
Abbr.	Party	Votes	%
AKP	Justice and Development Party	64,313	59.4%
MHP	Nationalist Movement Party	30,965	28.6%
CHP	Republican People's Party	7,213	6.7%
SP	Felicity Party	2,610	2.4%
HDP	Peoples' Democratic Party	914	0.8%
	Other	2,233	2.1%
Total		108,248	
Turnout		84.31	
source: YSK

=== November 2015 ===
Abbr.	Party	Votes	%
AKP	Justice and Development Party	75,808	69.1%
MHP	Nationalist Movement Party	23,781	21.7%
CHP	Republican People's Party	6,469	5.9%
SP	Felicity Party	822	0.7%
HDP	Peoples' Democratic Party	459	0.4%
	Other	2,384	2.2%
Total		109,723	
Turnout		85.89	
source: YSK

=== 2018 ===
Abbr.	Party	Votes	%
AKP	Justice and Development Party	67,305	58.3%
MHP	Nationalist Movement Party	22,626	19.6%
IYI	Good Party	13,856	12%
CHP	Republican People's Party	7,277	6.3%
SP	Felicity Party	1,270	1.1%
HDP	Peoples' Democratic Party	702	0.6%
	Other	2,508	2.2%
Total		115,544	
Turnout		88.17	
source: YSK

== Presidential elections ==
=== 2014 ===
2014 presidential election: Çankırı
Party	Candidate	Votes	%
AK Party	Recep Tayyip Erdoğan	76,299	73.69
Independent	Ekmeleddin İhsanoğlu	26,200	25.30
HDP	Selahattin Demirtaş	1.040	1.00
Total votes		103,539	100.00
Rejected ballots		2,168	2.05
Turnout		105,707	78.08
Recep Tayyip Erdoğan win			
