= 2015 Turkish general election =

Two general elections were held in Turkey in 2015. The first on June 7 2015 and the second on November 1 2015, since the previous produced a hung parliament.

- June 2015 Turkish general election
- November 2015 Turkish general election
