= Burdur (electoral district) =

Electoral district for the Grand National Assembly of Turkey

Coordinates: 37°50′N 34°45′E

- electoral district for the Grand National Assembly of Turkey
- Burdur shown within Turkey
- Province: Burdur
- Electorate: 186,470

Current electoral district
- Created: 1923
- Seats: 3
- Turnout at last election: 91.52%
- Representation
- AK Party: 2 / 3
- CHP: 1 / 3

Burdur is an electoral district of the Grand National Assembly of Turkey. It elects three members of parliament (deputies) to represent the province of the same name for a four-year term by the D'Hondt method, a party-list proportional representation system.

== Members ==
Population reviews of each electoral district are conducted before each general election, which can lead to certain districts being granted a smaller or greater number of parliamentary seats. Burdur has continuously elected three MPs since 1999.

MPs for Burdur, 2002 onwards
Election	2002 (22nd Parliament)	2007 (23rd Parliament)	2011 (24th Parliament)	June 2015 (25th Parliament)	November 2015 (26th Parliament)
MP	Mehmet Alp; AK Party		Hasan Hami Yıldırım; AK Party	Reşat Petek; AK Party	
MP	Bayram Özçelik; AK Party			Alparslan Ahmet Dursun; MHP	Bayram Özçelik; AK Party
MP	Ramazan Kerim Özkan; CHP			Mehmet Göker; CHP	

== General elections ==
=== 2011 ===
2011 general election: Burdur
Party	Candidate	Votes	%	±%
AK Party	2 elected 0: 1. Bayram Özçilek ✓; 2. Hasan Hami Yıldırım ✓; 3. Mehmet Tuğrul ✗	81,582	48.99	▲7.55
CHP	1 elected 0: 1. Ramazan Kerim Özkan ✓; 2. Yakup Yıldız ✗; 3. Bayram Tekin ✗	42,314	25.41	▲4.10
MHP	None elected: 1. Nazif Aktürk ✗; 2. Alparslan Ahmet Dursun ✗; 3. Hikmet Ökte ✗	31,033	18.63	0.00
SAADET	None elected: 1. Mustafa Düzgün ✗; 2. Ramazan Kayabaş ✗; 3. Hatice Kaya ✗	2,917	1.75	▲0.76
HAS Party	None elected: 1. Muzzafer Bağcı ✗; 2. Zeynep Bekar ✗; 3. Mehmet Küley ✗	2,018	1.21	▲1.21
DP	None elected: 1. Gülsüm Özcan ✗; 2. Arif Serdar Doğankılıç ✗; 3. Ahmet Fener ✗	1,486	0.89	▼8.80
Büyük Birlik	None elected: 1. Durmuş Demir ✗; 2. Abdurrahman Sarı ✗; 3. Murat Dinler ✗	1,385	0.83	▲0.83
HEPAR	None elected: 1.vRecep Bakırcı ✗; 2. Şekip Yılmaz ✗; 3. İsmet Uluer ✗	1,048	0.63	▲0.63
DSP	None elected: 1. Teoman Toyman ✗; 2. İbrahim Ak ✗; 3. Erol Sancar ✗	711	0.43	N/A
DYP	None elected: 1. Berna Öztürk ✗; 2. Melik Kaba ✗; 3. Sedat Onat ✗	603	0.36	▲0.36
Labour	None elected: 1. İsmail Muzaffer Özkurt ✗; 2. Hatice Kaya ✗; 3. Aysun Cerek ✗	427	0.26	▲0.03
Nationalist Conservative	None elected: 1. Ayhan Özyurt ✗; 2. Gğrhan Şahin ✗; 3. Halil Kaya ✗	287	0.17	▲0.17
MP	None elected: 1. Muhammet Soydal ✗; 2. Emre Karaardıç ✗; 3. Hüseyin Kiriş ✗	280	0.17	▲0.17
TKP	None elected: 1. Müge Azizoğlu ✗; 2. Ogün Eratalay ✗; 3. Özge Ergün ✗	189	0.11	▼0.07
Liberal Democrat	None elected: 1. Feyza Geçmen ✗; 2. Kadir Çelik ✗; 3. Devrim Güleç ✗	144	0.09	▼0.19
Independent	None elected: Halil Ölmez ✗	115	0.07	▼0.01
Total votes		166,539	100.00	
Rejected ballots		4,115	2.41	▼0.77
Turnout		170,654	91.52	▼0.65

=== June 2015 ===
Abbr.	Party	Votes	%
AKP	Justice and Development Party	71,464	42.9%
CHP	Republican People's Party	45,467	27.3%
MHP	Nationalist Movement Party	38,655	23.2%
SP	Felicity Party	4,388	2.6%
HDP	Peoples' Democratic Party	2,457	1.5%
	Other	3,985	2.4%
Total		166,416	
Turnout		89.26	
source: YSK

=== June 2015 ===
Abbr.	Party	Votes	%
AKP	Justice and Development Party	84,716	50.6%
CHP	Republican People's Party	41,876	25%
MHP	Nationalist Movement Party	33,022	19.7%
SP	Felicity Party	1,906	1.1%
HDP	Peoples' Democratic Party	1,239	0.7%
	Other	4,685	2.8%
Total		167,444	
Turnout		89.52	
source: YSK

=== 2018 ===
Abbr.	Party	Votes	%
AKP	Justice and Development Party	72,191	42.2%
IYI	Good Party	34,726	20.3%
CHP	Republican People's Party	34,553	20.2%
MHP	Nationalist Movement Party	21,284	12.4%
SP	Felicity Party	2,643	1.5%
HDP	Peoples' Democratic Party	2,468	1.4%
	Other	3,288	1.9%
Total		171,133	
Turnout		90.19	
source: YSK

== Presidential elections ==
=== 2014 ===
2014 presidential election: Burdur
Party	Candidate	Votes	%
AK Party	Recep Tayyip Erdoğan	84,242	54.00
Independent	Ekmeleddin İhsanoğlu	68,510	43.91
HDP	Selahattin Demirtaş	3,257	2.09
Total votes		156,009	100.00
Rejected ballots		4,984	3.10
Turnout		160,993	84.12
Recep Tayyip Erdoğan win			
