= Amasya (electoral district) =

Electoral district for the Grand National Assembly of Turkey

Coordinates: 37°50′N 34°45′E

- electoral district for the Grand National Assembly of Turkey
- Amasya shown within Turkey
- Province: Amasya
- Electorate: 234,347

Current electoral district
- Created: 1923
- Seats: 3 Historical: 4 (1999)
- Turnout at last election: 91.66%
- Representation
- AK Party: 2 / 3
- CHP: 1 / 3

Amasya is an electoral district of the Grand National Assembly of Turkey. It elects three members of parliament (deputies) to represent the province of the same name for a four-year term by the D'Hondt method, a party-list proportional representation system.

== Members ==
Population reviews of each electoral district are conducted before each general election, which can lead to certain districts being granted a smaller or greater number of parliamentary seats. As one of the smallest electoral districts, Amasya elected four MPs in 1999, but the number of seats fell to three in 2002 and has remained as such ever since.

MPs for Amasya, 2002 onwards
Election	2002 (22nd Parliament)	2007 (23rd Parliament)	2011 (24th Parliament)	June 2015 (25th Parliament)	November 2015 (26th Parliament)
MP	Hamza Albayrak; AK Party	Avni Erdemir; AK Party		Sait Yüce; AK Party	Haluk İpek; AK Party
MP	Akif Gülle; AK Party		Mehmet Naci Bostancı; AK Party		
MP	Mustafa Sayar; CHP	Hüseyin Ünsal; CHP	Ramis Topal; CHP	Mustafa Tuncer; CHP	

== General elections ==
=== 2011 ===
2011 general election: Amasya
Party	Candidate	Votes	%	±%
AK Party	2 elected 0: 1. Mehmet Naci Bostancı ✓; 2. Avni Erdemir ✓; 3. Hasan Ali cesur ✗	110,459	52.36	▲5.26
CHP	1 elected 0: 1. Ramis Topal ✓; 2. Ali Özdemiroğlu ✗; 3. Devrim Ersoy ✗	59,066	28.00	▲2.38
MHP	None elected: 1. Kadir Ekercan ✗; 2. Kenan Erzurumlu ✗; 3. İsmet Saka ✗	31,801	15.07	▼0.19
SAADET	None elected: 1. Mahmut Yücel ✗; 2. Mustafa Damlar ✗; 3. Beyza Muhtaroğlu ✗	2,933	1.39	▼1.00
Büyük Birlik	None elected: 1. Ali Kurt ✗; 2. Nurhan Çolak ✗; 3. Salim Arifoğlu ✗	2,330	1.10	▲1.10
HAS Party	None elected: 1. Oğuzhan Çetinkaya ✗; 2. Alaattin Yüce ✗; 3. Şükrü Erdoğan ✗	1,740	0.82	▲0.82
DP	None elected: 1. Miraç Demirbaş ✗; 2. Harun Uysal ✗; 3. Ömer Akın ✗	1,422	0.67	▼4.85
Labour	None elected: 1. Hulusi Şimşek ✗; 2. Sadık Turan ✗; 3. Erhan Öztürk ✗	433	0.21	▼0.04
DYP	None elected: 1. Gani Danacı ✗; 2. Gülser Taşcı ✗; 3. Hasan Ünal ✗	399	0.19	▲0.19
DSP	None elected: 1. Alaattin Bayram ✗; 2. Hamdi Yıldırım ✗; 3. Dursun Duran ✗	272	0.13	N/A
Nationalist Conservative	None elected: 1. Tarkan Güncel ✗; 2. Metin Pelit ✗; 3. Naci Türkgözü ✗	245	0.12	▲0.12
HEPAR	None elected: 1. Yakup Saruhan ✗; 2. Uğur Karaçuka ✗; 3. Mehmet Eker ✗	221	0.10	▲0.10
TKP	None elected: 1. Mehmet Bozkurt ✗; 2. Ebru Baltakıran ✗; 3. Galib Demirtaş ✗	136	0.06	▼0.05
MP	None elected: 1. Mehmet Küçüköner ✗; 2. Bilal Helvacı ✗; 3. Abdullah Köroğlu ✗	116	0.05	▲0.05
Liberal Democrat	None elected: 1. Emine Çetin ✗; 2. Mustafa Damlar ✗; 3. Beyza Muhtaroğlu ✗	62	0.03	▼0.09
Total votes		210,961	100.00	
Rejected ballots		3,850	1.79	▲0.84
Turnout		214,811	91.66	▲6.96

=== June 2015 ===
Abbr.	Party	Votes	%
AKP	Justice and Development Party	95,918	45.8%
CHP	Republican People's Party	54,934	26.2%
MHP	Nationalist Movement Party	48,037	22.9%
SP	Felicity Party	4,692	2.2%
HDP	Peoples' Democratic Party	2,465	1.2%
	Other	3,503	1.7%
Total		209,549	
Turnout		89.68	
source: YSK

=== November 2015 ===
Abbr.	Party	Votes	%
AKP	Justice and Development Party	109,491	51.5%
CHP	Republican People's Party	52,129	24.5%
MHP	Nationalist Movement Party	43,679	20.6%
HDP	Peoples' Democratic Party	1,666	0.8%
SP	Felicity Party	1,311	0.6%
	Other	4,192	1.9%
Total		212,468	
Turnout		90.28	
source: YSK

=== 2018 ===
Abbr.	Party	Votes	%
AKP	Justice and Development Party	101,546	46%
CHP	Republican People's Party	54,804	24.8%
MHP	Nationalist Movement Party	27,198	12.3%
IYI	Good Party	27,122	12.3%
HDP	Peoples' Democratic Party	3,982	1.8%
SP	Felicity Party	2,469	1.1%
	Other	3,622	1.6%
Total		220,743	
Turnout		91.51	
source: YSK

== Presidential elections ==
=== 2014 ===
2014 presidential election: Amasya
Party	Candidate	Votes	%
AK Party	Recep Tayyip Erdoğan	111,044	56.66
Independent	Ekmeleddin İhsanoğlu	82,646	42.17
HDP	Selahattin Demirtaş	2,279	1.16
Total votes		195,969	100.00
Rejected ballots		2,974	1.99
Turnout		199,943	83.82
Recep Tayyip Erdoğan win			
