= Kırklareli (electoral district) =

Electoral district for the Grand National Assembly of Turkey

Coordinates: 41°40′N 27°30′E

- electoral district for the Grand National Assembly of Turkey
- Kırklareli shown within Turkey
- Province: Kırklareli
- Electorate: 254,455

Current electoral district
- Created: 1920
- Seats: 3 Historical: 4 (1995-1999) 3 (1973-1995) 4 (1961-1973) 6 (1957-1961) 5 (1954-1957)
- MPs: List: Mehmet Siyam Kesimoğlu CHP Turgut Dibek CHP Şenol Gürşan AK Party
- Turnout at last election: 90.78%
- Representation
- CHP: 2 / 3
- AK Party: 1 / 3

Kırklareli is an electoral district of the Grand National Assembly of Turkey. It elects three members of parliament (deputies) to represent the province of the same name for a four-year term by the D'Hondt method, a party-list proportional representation system.

== Members ==
Population reviews of each electoral district are conducted before each general election, which can lead to certain districts being granted a smaller or greater number of parliamentary seats. Kırklareli's seat allocation has been three seats since 1999.

MPs for Kırklareli, 1999 onwards
Seat	1999 (21st parliament)	2002 (22nd parliament)	2007 (23rd parliament)	2011 (24th parliament)	June 2015 (25th parliament)
1	Necdet Tekin; DSP	Mehmet Siyam Kesimoğlu; CHP	Tansel Barış; CHP	Mehmet Siyam Kesimoğlu; CHP	Türabi Kayan; CHP
2	Nural Karagöz; DSP	Yavuz Altınorak; CHP	Turgut Dibek; CHP		Vecdi Gündoğdu; CHP
3	Cemal Özbilen; Motherland	Ahmet Gökhan Sarıçam; AK Party		Şenol Gürşan; AK Party	Hamdi Irmak; AK Party

== General elections ==
=== 2011 ===
General Election 2011: Kırklareli
Party	Candidate	Votes	%	±%
CHP	2 elected 0: 1. Mehmet Siyam Kesimoğlu ✓; 2. Turgut Dibek ✓; 3. Türabi Kayan ✗	119,598	52.53	▲12.41
AK Party	1 elected 0: 1. Şenol Gürşan ✓; 2. Şaban Erden ✗; 3. Volkan Göç ✗	62,445	27.43	▲7.26
MHP	None elected: 1. Cemal Özbilen ✗; 2. Armağan Ayyıldız ✗; 3. Cemal Terzi ✗	37,638	16.53	▲0.66
DP	None elected: 1. Sinan Katnaş ✗; 2. İsmet Karadöl ✗; 3. Arif Deniz ✗	1,708	0.75	▼8.25
DSP	None elected: 1. Kemal İnebolu ✗; 2. İlhan Özaltan ✗; 3. Özkan Yar ✗	928	0.41	N/A'"`UNIQ−−ref−0000000E−QINU`"'
SAADET	None elected: 1. Özay Dilber ✗; 2. Dilek Gündüz ✗; 3. Feridun Mercan ✗	880	0.39	▼0.39
Labour	None elected: 1. Özlem Boyraz Özel ✗; 2. Aynur Toso ✗; 3. Erdal Tektaş ✗	854	0.38	▲0.23
HEPAR	None elected: 1. Erdem Esmer ✗; 2. Alİ Uşar ✗; 3. Erdem Özdemir ✗	839	0.37	▲0.38
HAS Party	None elected: 1. Nihat Karaçam ✗; 2. Müjdat Süpürgeci ✗; 3. Yakup Küçüker ✗	835	0.37	▲0.37
DYP	None elected: 1. Zekayi Algur ✗; 2. İbrahim Ethem Hekimoğlu ✗; 3. Ferhan İnoğlu ✗	511	0.22	▲0.22
Independent	None elected: Halil İbrahim Nebiler ✗	368	0.16	▼0.03
Büyük Birlik	None elected: 1. Ahmet Ali Kaplan ✗; 2. Hayati Örencik ✗; 3. Necati Çetin ✗	293	0.13	▲0.13
TKP	None elected: 1. Ekim Orhan İsmi ✗; 2. Nevin Erbil ✗; 3. Yeter Özkan ✗	263	0.12	▼0.01
Nationalist Conservative	None elected: 1. Sedat Tosun ✗; 2. Mehmet Göç ✗; 3. Adem Köse ✗	205	0.09	▲0.09
MP	None elected: 1. Hikmet Sofu ✗; 2. Rahime Edibali ✗; 3. Şevket Kara ✗	202	0.09	▲0.09
Liberal Democrat	None elected: 1. Ahmet Özen ✗; 2. Şuayip Demirci ✗; 3. Gül Denge Düzelt ✗	106	0.05	▼0.11
Total votes		227,673	100.00	
Rejected ballots		4,006	1.76	▲0.88
Turnout		230,993	90.78	▲0.29
CHP hold Majority		57,153	25.10	▲5.32

=== June 2015 ===
Abbr.	Party	Votes	%
CHP	Republican People's Party	115,951	50.1%
AK Party	Justice and Development Party	53,399	23.1%
MHP	Nationalist Movement Party	49,487	21.4%
HDP	Peoples' Democratic Party	5,342	2.3%
	Other	7,075	3.1%
Total		231,254	
Turnout		88.99%	
source: YSK

=== November 2015 ===
Abbr.	Party	Votes	%
CHP	Republican People's Party	129,440	55.7%
AK Party	Justice and Development Party	64,270	27.7%
MHP	Nationalist Movement Party	28,776	12.4%
HDP	Peoples' Democratic Party	4,212	1.8%
	Other	5,593	2.4%
Total		232,291	
Turnout		88.81%	
source: YSK

=== 2018 ===
Abbr.	Party	Votes	%
CHP	Republican People's Party	116,179	48.1%
AK Party	Justice and Development Party	62,148	25.8%
IYI	Good Party	40,069	16.6%
MHP	Nationalist Movement Party	11,367	4.7%
HDP	Peoples' Democratic Party	7,123	3%
	Other	4,461	1.8%
Total		241,347	
Turnout		90.37%	
source: YSK

== Presidential elections ==
=== 2014 ===
Presidential Election 2014: Kırklareli
Party	Candidate	Votes	%
Independent	Ekmeleddin İhsanoğlu	144,558	67.95
AK Party	Recep Tayyip Erdoğan	63,328	29.77
HDP	Selahattin Demirtaş	4,861	2.28
Total votes		212,747	100.00
Rejected ballots		3,226	1.49
Turnout		215,973	82.54
Ekmeleddin İhsanoğlu win			
