= Kastamonu (electoral district) =

Electoral district for the Grand National Assembly of Turkey

Coordinates: 41°30′N 33°40′E

- electoral district for the Grand National Assembly of Turkey
- Kastamonu shown within Turkey
- Province: Kastamonu
- Electorate: 269,570

Current electoral district
- Created: 1920
- Seats: 3 Historical: 4 (1999-2011) 5 (1995-1999) 4 (1983-1995) 5 (1977-1983) 6 (1969-1977) 7 (1961-1969) 10 (1954-1961)
- MPs: List: Hakkı Köylü AK Party Mustafa Gökhan Gülşen AK Party Emin Çınar MHP
- Turnout at last election: 88.29%
- Representation
- AK Party: 2 / 3
- MHP: 1 / 3

Kastamonu is an electoral district of the Grand National Assembly of Turkey. It elects three members of parliament (deputies) to represent the province of the same name for a four-year term by the D'Hondt method, a party-list proportional representation system.

== Members ==
Population reviews of each electoral district are conducted before each general election, which can lead to certain districts being granted a smaller or greater number of parliamentary seats. At the last election Kastamonu's seat allocation was reduced to three seats after the province was represented by four MPs for twelve years.

MPs for Kastamonu, 1999 onwards
Seat	1999 (21st parliament)	2002 (22nd parliament)	2007 (23rd parliament)	2011 (24th parliament)	June 2015 (25th parliament)
1	Muharrem Hadi Dilekçi; DSP	Hakkı Köylü; AK Party			Metin Çelik; AK Party
2	Nurhan Tekinel; DYP	Musa Sıvacıoğlu; AK Party		Mustafa Gökhan Gülşen; AK Party	
3	Mehmet Serdaroğlu; MHP	Mehmet Yıldırım; CHP	Mehmet Serdaroğlu; MHP	Emin Çınar; MHP	
4	Murat Başesgioğlu; Motherland	Sinan Özkan; AK Party	Hasan Altan; AK Party	No seat	

== General elections ==
=== 2011 ===
General Election 2011: Kastamonu
Party	Candidate	Votes	%	±%
AK Party	2 elected ▼1: 1. Hakkı Köylü ✓; 2. Mustafa Gökhan Gülşen ✓; 3. Zafer Nalbantoğlu ✗	130,136	55.83	▲6.39
MHP	1 elected 0: 1. Emin Çınar ✓; 2. Nurullah Kayıran ✗; 3. Murat Savaş Yücel ✗	53,747	23.06	▲5.63
CHP	None elected: 1. Bahri Gökçebay ✗; 2. Hasan Baltacı ✗; 3. Ayşenur Özden ✗	34,168	14.66	▲0.69
HAS Party	None elected: 1. Mücahit Dağdelenoğlu ✗; 2. Hasan Mete Dikişçi ✗; 3. İbrahim Tevfik Tiryaki ✗	4,014	1.72	▲1.72
DP	None elected: 1. Ahmet Rugancı ✗; 2. Ayfer Demir ✗; 3. Erhan Deler ✗	3,110	1.33	▼8.49
SAADET	None elected: 1. Halim Balcı ✗; 2. Hamit Serdar Yılmaz ✗; 3. Nihat Yazıcıoğlu ✗	1,918	0.82	▼0.88
Büyük Birlik	None elected: 1. Ahmet Yelis ✗; 2. Galip Yaman ✗; 3. Satılmış Külçe ✗	1,183	0.51	▲0.51
DSP	None elected: 1. Salih Çelebi ✗; 2. Şenol Çeli ✗; 3. Faik Kaya ✗	1,017	0.44	N/A
DYP	None elected: 1. Mustafa Türkistanlı ✗; 2. Hakan Çoban ✗; 3. Soner Demircan ✗	996	0.43	▲0.43
HEPAR	None elected: 1. İsmail Yüce ✗; 2. Birol Bal ✗; 3. Semra Vakit ✗	920	0.39	▲0.39
Labour	None elected: 1. Başak Sopacı ✗; 2. Derya Kaplan ✗; 3. Pınar Yavuz ✗	541	0.23	▼0.11
MP	None elected: 1. Mehmet Bilge ✗; 2. Sevim Gür ✗; 3. Sibel Öztürk ✗	395	0.17	▲0.17
Nationalist Conservative	None elected: 1. Faruk Kabakcı ✗; 2. Satılmış Çolak ✗; 3. Turan Kayacan ✗	385	0.17	▲0.17
TKP	None elected: 1. Niyazi Kebelioğlu ✗; 2. Erol Boduroğlu ✗; 3. Deniz Yılmazgil ✗	293	0.13	▼0.15
Liberal Democrat	None elected: 1. Mehmet İleri ✗; 2. Türkan Kuzucu ✗; 3. Ümmiye Tüzer ✗	281	0.12	▼0.35
Total votes		233,104	100.00	
Rejected ballots		5,610	2.36	▲0.89
Turnout		237,994	88.29	▲1.78
AK Party hold Majority		76,389	32.77	▲0.76

== Presidential elections ==
=== 2014 ===
Presidential Election 2014: Kastamonu
Party	Candidate	Votes	%
AK Party	Recep Tayyip Erdoğan	142,533	65.83
Independent	Ekmeleddin İhsanoğlu	70,957	32.77
HDP	Selahattin Demirtaş	3,035	1.40
Total votes		216,525	100.00
Rejected ballots		5,085	2.29
Turnout		221,610	79.37
Recep Tayyip Erdoğan win			
