= Vote and Beyond =

Vote and Beyond (Oy ve Ötesi)
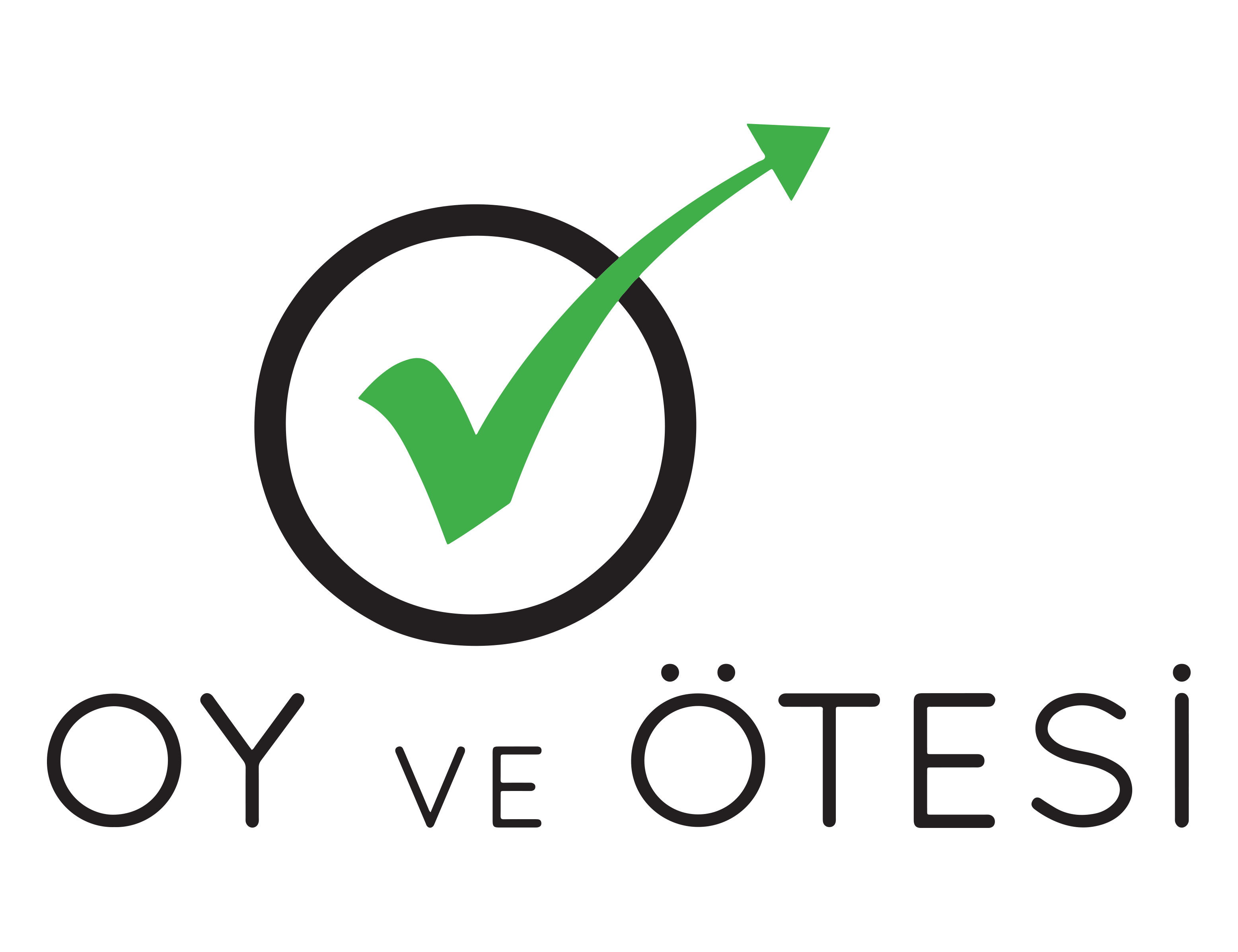
- Founded: 24 April 2014
- Founder: Sercan Çelebi
- Purpose: Democracy
- Location: Galatasaray-Beyoğlu, Istanbul, Turkey
- Method: Ballot count security
- Volunteers: 55,000 (2015)
- Website: oyveotesi.org

Vote and Beyond (Turkish: Oy ve Ötesi) is a civil movement of volunteer citizens mobilized to raise and promote participative democracy in Turkey. In 2013, Vote and Beyond triggered the idea of civil election monitoring for the first time in Turkey as the initial step towards participative democracy. The association gained legal entity as an NGO on 24 April 2014.

Vote and Beyond's principle mission is to develop civic consciousness for participatory democracy in Turkey. The association produces liberal, equitable, fair, sustainable and permanent solutions for environmental and social problems by using scientific and objective methods.

== Foundation ==
Start of the Vote and Beyond initiative dates back to Gezi Park protests in 2013. It was founded by 8 volunteers that aim to direct the efforts of the protesters to a solid and fast resulting movement, since a great majority of the protesters were not related to any political entity before the protests. Based on scientific research results done with Turkish voters 28% of the participants of a survey who stated that they don't believe that the election results will not be fair increased to 43% in 2015. The same research demonstrated that ratio of voters who believe that the results of the elections will be fair decreased to 43% in 2015 from 70% in 2007.

== Activities ==
Vote and Beyond's activities are divided into two parts: the election period (Vote) and the post-election period (Beyond).

The activities during the election period aims:

- To increase the voter turnout
- To promote transparency in the election campaigns
- To organize civil election monitoring.

Vote and Beyond has successfully observed and reported nine elections since 2014. Aside from these, the association has created a digital system known as T3 (Türkiye Tutanak Teyit) and a mobile application known as T3TG (T3 Tutanak Gönder). Using these digital tools, volunteers' photographs of ballot box results can be converted into electronic data and compared to the official results.

The Beyond activities held during the post-election period are:

- Conferences that include comparative analyses of international examples, and promote transparency and accountability.

- #HERYERANAYASA (2015): A cartoon campaign that aims to raise public awareness about the constitution.

- PODCAST-19 (2020): A podcast series in which volunteers and experts from various fields discuss the COVID-19 outbreak from various perspectives.

- Digital Democracy Platform (2021): A project aimed at promoting and encouraging the use of participatory digital democracy tools by local governments in Turkey. The project's pilot phase is being carried out in Istanbul's Avcılar district.
