= İhsan Özkes =

Turkish politician

Member of the Grand National Assembly
- In office 12 June 2011 – 1 November 2015
- Constituency: Istanbul (2011, June 2015)

Personal details
- Born: 1 August 1957 (age 69) Çorum, Turkey
- Party: Republican People's Party (2011–2015)
- Children: 5
- Education: Marmara University
- Occupation: Mufti, politician

İhsan Özkes (born 1 August 1957) is a Turkish politician, and cleric.

== Early life and education ==
Özkes was born on 1 August 1957 in Çorum, Turkey. He graduated from Ankara İmam Hatip Lisesi in 1976 and served as an imam in Alaca for some time. In 1981, he graduated from İstanbul Yüksek İslam Enstitüsü (Night section) Tafsir-Hadith in first place. During higher education, he served as a Qur'an teacher in Beyoğlu. He holds a master's degree in Hadith from Al-Azhar University.

== Career ==
In 1981, he was assigned as the mufti of Gerze. During 1983–1985, he served as the Mufti of Sorgun, Yozgat. He was sent to Egypt by Diyanet İşleri Başkanlığı for a period of two years during when he earned master's degree in Hadith from Al-Azhar University in Cairo. In 1987, he was appointed as the Mufti of Akçakoca, Bolu. After that, he got his MA degree at Marmara University's Divinity College, under Hadith section, whilst attending Diyanet's Haseki Education Center.

While he was the Central Preacher of Istanbul, he was assigned as the Mufti of Üsküdar in 1992. Before the municipal elections in 1999, he left office to run for Üsküdar District Mayor with Democratic Left Party. After the elections he became the Mufti of Şile. Finally, in October 1999, he assumed office as the Mufti of Beyoğlu.

In December 2010, he was elected as a member of the Party Assembly of Republican People's Party (CHP). And in 2011 general elections, Ozkes was elected as CHP Deputy for Istanbul's 1st region. He ran for mayor of Uskudar during the 2014 Municipal Elections. He narrowed a 15% deficit (from 2011 elections) to about 2% and his dispute of the election results is currently at the Constitutional Court.

Ozkes was elected to the party council on September 6, 2014, with the highest number of votes. He is reelected as an MP for Istanbul in 2015 general elections.

=== Current and recent positions ===
- CHP Deputy for Istanbul (1st Region)
- Member of CHP Party Assembly
- Member of Turkish PUIC Delegation

=== Stance on current debates in Turkey ===
He claimed, asked on the debate on new abortion law proposal which is expected to restrict abortions, that "Islam is more permissive than Christianity" and that the issue is rather political than religious, and that the ruling party is trying to distract attentions from a recent governmental failure that caused killing of 35 villagers in Southeastern Turkey.

== Duties as Mufti ==
- Gerze, Sinop
- Sorgun, Yozgat
- Akçakoca, Bolu
- Üsküdar, Istanbul
- Şile, Istanbul
- Beyoğlu, Istanbul
- Yüreğir, Adana

== Publications (Turkish) ==
- Riyaz'üs-Salihin Terceme ve Şerhi (Translation of Riyadh as-Saaliheen with Commentary)
- Peygamberimiz Döneminde Kadınlar (Women at the Time of Our Prophet)
- Oruç, Mübarek Geceler ve Bayramlar (Fasting, Religious Nights and Feasts)
- İnanç Sömürüsü İslam'a ve Uygarlığa Büyük Engeldir (Religious Exploitation is A Great Hindrance for Islam and Civilization)
- Siyasallaştırılan Din, Dinleştirilen Siyaset (Religion Politicized, Politics Religionized)
- Daraltılan Din, Tartılan İman (Religion Narrowed, Faith Weighed)
- Emevi Siyaseti - Dinin Saltanata Dönüşmesi (Umayyad Politics - From Religion to Empire)
