= True Path Party (2007) =

True Path Party Doğru Yol Partisi
- Leader: Cenk Küpeli
- Founded: 28 May 2007
- Split from: Democrat Party
- Headquarters: GMK Bulvarı No:83/19 Maltepe - Ankara, Turkey
- Membership (2026): ▼3,432
- Colors: Red; White; Purple (customary)

Website
- http://www.dyp.org.tr

The True Path Party (Turkish: Doğru Yol Partisi), abbreviated to DYP, is a centre-right, conservative Turkish political party, established by the lawyer Çetin Özaçıkgöz in 2007. It got 0.15% of the votes in the general elections of 2011.

It is not to be confused with the original True Path Party founded in 1983 by Ahmet Nusret Tuna, which was renamed to Democrat Party in 2007.

== See also ==
- Politics of Turkey
- List of political parties in Turkey
