= Electoral history of Recep Tayyip Erdoğan =

Elections featuring President of Turkey

Recep Tayyip Erdoğan was a Mayor of Istanbul and is the 1st leader of the Justice and Development Party and the 25th Prime Minister of the Republic of Turkey. He has been involved in many elections on local, leadership and nationwide stage since his first election to the Grand National Assembly in 1986.

== Local elections, 1994 ==
Candidate	Party	Percentage	Votes
Recep Tayyip Erdoğan	Welfare Party	25.19	973,704
İlhan Kesici	Motherland Party	22.14	855,897
Zülfü Livaneli	Social Democratic Populist Party	20.30	784,693
Bedrettin Dalan	True Path Party	15.46	597,461
Zekeriya Temizel	Democratic Left Party	12.38	478,612
Unknown	Nationalist Movement Party	1.87	72,121
Ertuğrul Günay	Republican People's Party	1.40	54,028
Unknown	Great Union Party	0.35	13,662
Unknown	Nation Party	0.31	12,294
Unknown	Rebirth Party	0.21	7,979
Unknown	Socialist Union Party	0.18	7,075
Unknown	Workers' Party	0.13	5,215

== General election, 2002 ==
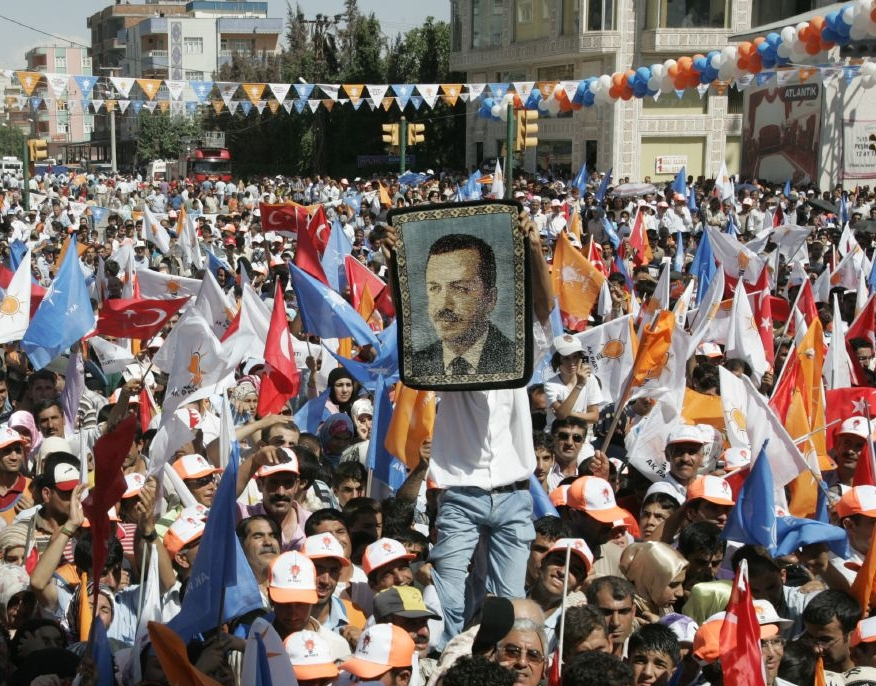
A wall rug of Erdoğan at a rally of the Justice and Development Party

Leader	Party		Votes	Percentage	Swing%	Seats	Change
Recep Tayyip Erdoğan	d	Justice and Development Party	10,808,229	34.28	▲34.28	363	+363
Deniz Baykal		Republican People's Party	6,113,352	19.38	▲10.69	178	+178
Tansu Çiller		True Path Party	3,008,942	9.54	▼2.45	0	−85
Devlet Bahçeli		Nationalist Movement Party	2,635,787	8.34	▼9.64	0	−129
Cem Uzan		Young Party	2,285,598	7.25	▲7.25	0	0
Mehmet Abbasoğlu		Democratic People's Party	1,955,298	6.23	▲1.48	0	0
Mesut Yılmaz		Motherland Party	1,609,736	5.13	▼8.09	0	−86
Recai Kutan		Felicity Party	785,489	2.49	▼12.93	0	−111
Bülent Ecevit		Democratic Left Party	384,009	1.22	▼20.97	0	−136
İsmail Cem İpekçi		New Turkey Party	361,284	1.15	▲1.15	0	0
Muhsin Yazıcıoğlu		Great Union Party	321,046	1.02	▼0.44	0	0
Sadettin Tantan		Homeland Party	294,560	0.94	▲0.94	0	0
Doğu Perinçek		Workers Party	161,563	0.51	▲0.33	0	0
Haydar Baş		Independent Turkey Party	150,385	0.48	▲0.48	0	0
Ufuk Uras		Freedom and Solidarity Party	106,023	0.34	▼0.46	0	0
Besim Tibuk		Liberal Democratic Party	89,331	0.28	▼0.13	0	0
Aykut Edibali		Nation Party	68,271	0.22	▼0.03	0	0
Aydemir Güler		Communist Party of Turkey	59,180	0.19	▲0.07	0	0
−		Independents	310,145	0.99	▲0.12	9	+6

== By-election, 2003 ==
Leader	Party	Votes	Percentage	Swing%	Seats	Change
Recep Tayyip Erdoğan	Justice and Development Party	55,203	84.82	▲67.26	3	+2
Deniz Baykal	Republican People's Party	8,972	13.79	▲4.87	0	−1
Doğu Perinçek	Workers' Party	500	0.77	▲0.63	0	0
Aydemir Güler	Communist Party of Turkey	404	0.62	▲0.52	0	0

== Local elections, 2004 ==
Leader	Party	Votes	Percentage	CC members
Recep Tayyip Erdoğan	Justice and Development Party	13,448,587	41.67	2.276
Deniz Baykal	Republican People's Party	5,883,696	18.23	392
Devlet Bahçeli	Nationalist Movement Party	3,372,732	10.45	178
Mehmet Ağar	True Path Party	3,216,737	9.97	156
Murat Karayalçın	Social Democratic People's Party	1,662,280	5.15	129
Recai Kutan	Felicity Party	1,297,736	4.02	19
Cem Uzan	Young Party	839,897	2.60	4
Nesrin Nas	Motherland Party	807,842	2.50	26
Bülent Ecevit	Democratic Left Party	683,782	2.12	9
Muhsin Yazıcıoğlu	Great Union Party	374,125	1.16	7
−	Independents	234,443	0.73	9
Haydar Baş	Independent Turkey Party	154,519	0.48	0
Aydemir Güler	Communist Party of Turkey	85,188	0.26	0
Doğu Perinçek	Workers' Party	79,774	0.25	0
İsmail Cem	New Turkey Party	79,584	0.25	0
Levent Tüzel	Labour Party	18.695	0.06	1
Ufuk Uras	Freedom and Solidarity Party	12.406	0.04	0
Aykut Edibali	Nation Party	8,711	0.03	0
Yaşar Aydın	Democratic Party	7,837	0.02	2
Tuğrul Türkeş	Bright Turkey Party	3,872	0.01	0
−	Liberal Democratic Party	0	0.00	0

== General election, 2007 ==
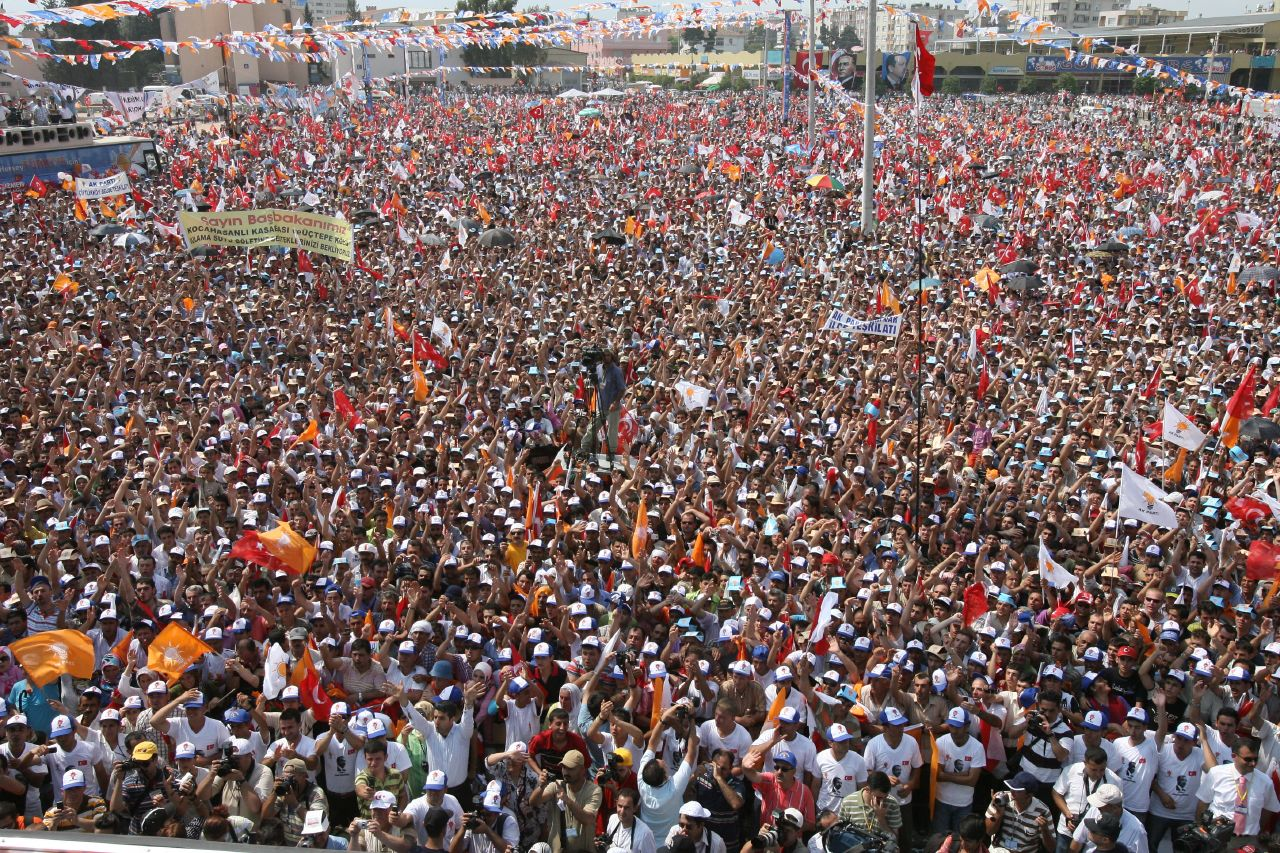
A rally of the Justice and Development Party in 2007

Leader	Party		Votes	Percentage	Swing%	Seats	Change
Recep Tayyip Erdoğan	d	Justice and Development Party	16,327,291	46.58	▲12.30	341	–23
Deniz Baykal		Republican People's Party	7,317,808	20.88	▲1.49	112	–66
Devlet Bahçeli		Nationalist Movement Party	5,001,869	14.27	▲5.91	71	+71
Mehmet Ağar		Democratic Party	1,898,873	5.42	▼4.12	0	0
–		Independents	1,835,486	5.24	▲4.24	26	+18
Cem Uzan		Young Party	1,064,871	3.04	▼4.21	0	0
Recai Kutan		Felicity Party	820,289	2.34	▼0.15	0	0
Haydar Baş		Independent Turkey Party	182,095	0.52	▲0.04	0	0
Yaşar Nuri Öztürk		People's Ascent Party	179,010	0.51	▲0.51	0	0
Doğu Perinçek		Workers' Party	128,148	0.37	▼0.14	0	0
Oktay Öztürk		Bright Turkey Party	100,982	0.29	▲0.29	0	0
Aydemir Güler		Communist Party of Turkey	79,258	0.23	▲0.04	0	0
Ufuk Uras		Freedom and Solidarity Party	52,055	0.15	▼0.19	0	0
Cem Toker		Liberal Democratic Party	35,364	0.10	▼0.18	0	0
Levent Tüzel		Labour Party	26,292	0.08	▲0.08	0	0

== Constitutional referendum, 2007 ==
Options	Votes	Percentage
✓ Yes (supported by Recep Tayyip Erdoğan)	19,422,714	68.95%
✗ No	8,744,94	31.05%

== Local elections, 2009 ==
Leader	Party	Votes	Percentage	CC members
Recep Tayyip Erdoğan	Justice and Development Party	15,353,553	38.39	1889
Deniz Baykal	Republican People's Party	9,229,936	23.08	612
Devlet Bahçeli	Nationalist Movement Party	6,386,279	15.97	414
Ahmet Türk	Democratic Society Party	2,277,777	5.70	235
Numan Kurtulmuş	Felicity Party	2,079,701	5.20	29
Süleyman Soylu	Democratic Party	1,536,847	3.84	45
Zeki Sezer	Democratic Left Party	1,139,878	2.85	26
Muhsin Yazıcıoğlu	Great Union Party	943,765	2.36	18
Salih Uzun	Motherland Party	304,361	0.76	4
–	Independent	172,279	0.43	7
Haydar Baş	Independent Turkey Party	167,986	0.42	1
Doğu Perinçek	Workers' Party	114,243	0.29	0
Erkan Baş	Communist Party of Turkey	85,507	0.21	0
Hayri Kozanoğlu	Özgürlük ve Dayanışma Partisi	67,984	0.17	0
Levent Tüzel	Labour Party	48,939	0.12	1
Aykut Edibali	Nation Party	41,818	0.10	0
Bayram Bozyel	Rights and Freedoms Party	29,392	0.07	0
Yaşar Nuri Öztürk	People's Ascent Party	6,197	0.02	0
Cem Toker	Liberal Democratic Party	2,285	0.01	0
Mustafa Ayzit	Peace and Democracy Party	36	0.00	0

== Constitutional referendum, 2010 ==
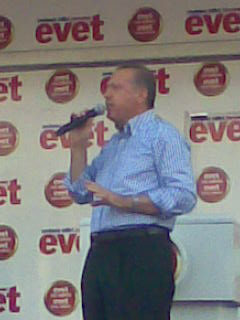
Erdoğan during a public appearance in Diyarbakir (September 3, 2010)

Options	Votes	Percentage
✓ Yes (supported by Recep Tayyip Erdoğan)	21,787,244	57.88%
✗ No	15,856,793	42.12%

== General election, 2011 ==
Leader	Party		Votes	Percentage	Swing%	Seats	Change
Recep Tayyip Erdoğan	d	Justice and Development Party	21,399,082	49.83	▲3.25	327	–14
Kemal Kılıçdaroğlu		Republican People's Party	11,155,972	25.98	▲5.10	135	+23
Devlet Bahçeli		Nationalist Movement Party	5,585,513	13.01	▼1.30	53	–18
–		Independent	2,819,917	6.57	▲1.33	35	+8
Mustafa Kamalak		Felicity Party	543,454	1.27	▼1.07	0	0
Numan Kurtulmuş		People's Voice Party	329,723	0.77	▲0.77	0	0
Yalçın Topçu		Great Union Party	323,251	0.75	▲0.75	0	0
Namık Kemal Zeybek		Democratic Party	279,480	0.65	▼4.77	0	0
Osman Pamukoğlu		Rights and Equality Party	124,415	0.29	▲0.29	0	0
Masum Türker		Democratic Left Party	108,089	0.25	▲0.25	0	0
Çetin Özaçıkgöz		True Path Party	64,607	0.15	▲0.15	0	0
Erkan Baş		Communist Party of Turkey	64,006	0.15	▼0.08	0	0
Aykut Edibali		Nation Party	60,716	0.14	▲0.14	0	0
Ahmet Reyiz Yılmaz		Nationalist and Conservative Party	36,188	0.08	▲0.08	0	0
Selma Gürkan		Labour Party	32,128	0.07	0.00	0	0
Cem Toker		Liberal Democratic Party	15,222	0.04	▼0.06	0	0

== Presidential election, 2014 ==
Candidate	Nationwide votes	% (of valid votes)	Overseas votes	%	Customs votes	%	Total votes	%
Recep Tayyip Erdoğan	20,670,826	51.65	143,873	62.30	185,444	62.73	21,000,143	51.79
Ekmeleddin Mehmet İhsanoğlu	15,434,167	38.57	64,483	27.92	89,070	30.13	15,587,720	38.44
Selahattin Demirtaş	3,914,359	9.78	22,582	9.78	21,107	7.14	3,958,048	9.76
Invalid/blank votes	734,140	-	1,857	-	1,719	-	737,716	–
Total	40,019,352	100	230,938	100	297,340	100	41,283,627	100
Registered voters/turnout	52,894,115	77.05	2,798,726	8.32	-	-	55,692,841	74.13
Source: YSK nationwide results, YSK overseas results, YSK customs results, YSK overall results

== Presidential election, 2018 ==
Candidate	Party	Votes	%
Recep Tayyip Erdoğan	Justice and Development Party	26,330,823	52.59
Muharrem İnce	Republican People's Party	15,340,321	30.64
Selahattin Demirtaş	Peoples' Democratic Party	4,205,794	8.40
Meral Akşener	Good Party	3,649,030	7.29
Temel Karamollaoğlu	Felicity Party	443,704	0.89
Doğu Perinçek	Patriotic Party	98,955	0.20
Total		50,068,627	100.00
Valid votes		50,068,627	97.79
Invalid/blank votes		1,129,332	2.21
Total votes		51,197,959	100.00
Registered voters/turnout		59,367,469	86.24
Source: YSK

== Local elections, 2019 ==
Party	Leader	Votes	Percentage
Justice and Development Party	Recep Tayyip Erdoğan	19,766,640	% 42.73
Republican People's Party	Kemal Kılıçdaroğlu	13,218,754	% 28.57
Nationalist Movement Party	Devlet Bahçeli	3,756,245	% 8.12
Good Party	Meral Akşener	3,376,292	% 7.30
Peoples' Democratic Party	Sezai Temelli, Pervin Buldan	2,703,595	% 5.84
Felicity Party	Temel Karamollaoğlu	1,312,780	% 2.84
Great Unity Party	Mustafa Destici	868,393	% 1.88
Democrat Party	Gültekin Uysal	411,190	% 0.89
Democratic Left Party	Önder Aksakal	378,706	% 0.82
Independents		139,989	% 0.30
Independent Turkey Party	Haydar Baş	126,836	% 0.27
Communist Party of Turkey	Aydemir Güler	111,775	% 0.24
Patriotic Party	Doğu Perinçek	92,580	% 0.20
Free Cause Party	İshak Sağlam	0	%0.00
Total		46,263,775	% 100.00

== Presidential election, 2023 ==
Candidate	Party	First round		Second round	
Candidate	Party	Votes	%	Votes	%
Recep Tayyip Erdoğan	Justice and Development Party	27,133,849	49.52	27,834,589	52.18
Kemal Kılıçdaroğlu	Republican People's Party	24,595,178	44.88	25,504,724	47.82
Sinan Oğan	Independent	2,831,239	5.17		
Muharrem İnce	Homeland Party	235,783	0.43		
Total		54,796,049	100.00	53,339,313	100.00
Valid votes		54,796,049	98.14	53,339,313	98.73
Invalid/blank votes		1,037,104	1.86	684,288	1.27
Total votes		55,833,153	100.00	54,023,601	100.00
Registered voters/turnout		64,145,504	87.04	64,197,454	84.15
Source: YSK, 1st round; 2nd round

== See also ==
- Elections in Turkey
- Prime Minister of Turkey
