= List of ministers of culture and tourism of Turkey =

The following is a list of ministers of culture and tourism of Turkey.

	Minister	Term start	Term end	Party
Ministers of Press, Broadcasting and Tourism (25 November 1957 – 19 July 1963)
1	Sıtkı Yırcalı	25 November 1957	10 July 1958	Democrat Party
2	Ali Server Somuncuoğlu	10 July 1958	17 February 1959	Democrat Party
3	Zühtü Tarhan	30 May 1960	27 August 1960	Independent
4	Selim Rauf Sarper	27 August 1960	5 January 1961	Independent
5	Mustafa Cihad Baban	5 January 1961	29 August 1961	Independent
6	Kemal Sahir Kurutluoğlu	2 September 1961	20 November 1961	Independent
7	Kamran Evliyaoğlu	20 November 1961	25 June 1962	Justice Party
8	Celal Tevfik Karasapan	25 June 1962	17 June 1963	Republican Villagers Nation Party
9	Nurettin Ardıçoğlu	17 June 1963	19 July 1963	Republican Villagers Nation Party
Ministers of Tourism and Publicity (19 July 1963 –10 December 1981)
1	Nurettin Ardıçoğlu	19 July 1963	25 December 1963	Republican Villagers Nation Party
2	Ali İhsan Göğüş	25 December 1963	20 February 1965	Republican People's Party
3	Ömer Zekai Dorman	20 February 1965	28 August 1965	Republican Villagers Nation Party
4	İsmail Hakkı Akdoğan	28 August 1965	27 October 1965	Republican Villagers Nation Party
5	Nihat Kürşat	27 October 1965	3 November 1969	Justice Party
6	Necmettin Cevheri	3 November 1969	26 March 1971	Justice Party
7	Erol Yılmaz Akçal	26 March 1971	15 April 1973	Justice Party
8	Ahmet İhsan Kırımlı	15 April 1973	26 January 1974	Justice Party
9	Orhan Birgit	26 January 1974	17 November 1974	Republican People's Party
10	İlhan Evliyaoğlu	17 November 1974	31 March 1975	Independent
11	Lütfi Tokoğlu	31 March 1975	11 April 1977	Justice Party
12	Nahit Menteşe	11 April 1977	21 June 1977	Justice Party
13	Altan Öymen	21 June 1977	21 July 1977	Republican People's Party
14	İskender Cenap Ege	21 July 1977	5 January 1978	Justice Party
15	Alev Coşkun	5 January 1978	12 November 1979	Republican People's Party
16	Barlas Küntay	12 November 1979	12 September 1980	Justice Party
17	İlhan Evliyaoğlu	20 September 1980	10 December 1981	Independent
Ministers of Culture (13 July 1971 – 10 December 1981)
1	Talat Sait Halman	13 July 1971	13 December 1971	Independent
2	Hayriye Ayşe Nermin Neftçi	17 November 1974	31 March 1975	Independent
3	Rıfkı Danışman	31 March 1975	21 June 1977	Justice Party
4	Avni Akyol	21 June 1977	5 January 1978	Justice Party
5	Ahmet Taner Kışlalı	5 January 1978	12 November 1979	Republican People's Party
6	Tevfik Koraltan	12 November 1979	12 September 1980	Justice Party
7	Mustafa Cihat Baban	20 September 1980	10 December 1981	Independent
Ministers of Culture and Tourism (10 December 1981 – 17 March 1989)
1	İlhan Evliyaoğlu	10 December 1981	13 December 1983	Motherland Party
2	Mükerrem Taşçıoğlu	13 December 1983	17 October 1986	Motherland Party
3	Ahmet Mesut Yılmaz	17 October 1986	21 December 1987	Motherland Party
4	Mustafa Tınaz Titiz	21 December 1987	17 March 1989	Motherland Party
Ministers of Tourism (17 March 1989 – 22 September 2003)
1	Mustafa Tınaz Titiz	17 March 1989	30 March 1989	Motherland Party
2	İlhan Aküzüm	30 March 1989	23 June 1991	Motherland Party
3	Bülent Akarcalı	23 June 1991	20 November 1991	Motherland Party
4	Abdülkadir Ateş	20 November 1991	27 July 1994	Social Democratic Populist Party
5	Halil Çulhaoğlu	27 July 1994	5 October 1994	Social Democratic Populist Party
6	Şahin Ulusoy	5 October 1994	27 March 1995	Republican People's Party
7	İrfan Gürpınar	27 March 1995	5 October 1995	Republican People's Party
8	Bilal Güngör	5 October 1995	30 October 1995	True Path Party
9	İrfan Gürpınar	30 October 1995	6 March 1996	Republican People's Party
10	Işılay Saygın	6 March 1996	28 June 1996	True Path Party
11	Bahattin Yücel	28 June 1996	13 June 1997	True Path Party
12	İbrahim Gürdal	30 June 1997	11 January 1999	Motherland Party
13	Ahmet Tan	11 January 1999	28 May 1999	Democratic Left Party
14	Erkan Mumcu	28 May 1999	8 August 2001	Motherland Party
15	Mustafa Rüştü Taşar	8 August 2001	18 November 2002	Motherland Party
16	Güldal Akşit	18 November 2002	29 September 2003	Justice and Development Party
Ministers of Culture (17 March 1989 – 29 April 2003)
1	Namık Kemal Zeybek	17 March 1989	23 June 1991	Motherland Party
2	Gökhan Maraş	23 June 1991	20 November 1991	Motherland Party
3	Fikri Sağlar	20 November 1991	27 July 1994	Social Democratic Populist Party
4	Timurçin Savaş	27 July 1994	27 March 1995	Social Democratic Populist Party
5	Ercan Karakaş	27 March 1995	24 June 1995	Republican People's Party
6	İsmail Cem	24 June 1995	5 October 1995	Republican People's Party
7	Köksal Toptan	5 October 1995	30 October 1995	True Path Party
8	Fikri Sağlar	30 October 1995	6 March 1996	Republican People's Party
9	Agah Oktay Güner	6 March 1996	28 June 1996	Motherland Party
10	İsmail Kahraman	28 June 1996	30 June 1997	Welfare Party
11	Mustafa İstemihan Talay	30 June 1997	9 July 2002	Democratic Left Party
12	Suat Çağlayan	9 July 2002	18 November 2002	Democratic Left Party
13	Hüseyin Çelik	18 November 2002	14 March 2003	Justice and Development Party
14	Erkan Mumcu	14 March 2003	29 April 2003	Justice and Development Party
Ministers of Culture and Tourism (29 April 2003 – present)
1	Erkan Mumcu	29 April 2003	15 February 2005	Justice and Development Party
2	Atilla Koç	21 February 2005	29 August 2007	Justice and Development Party
3	Ertuğrul Günay	29 August 2007	24 January 2013	Justice and Development Party
4	Ömer Çelik	24 January 2013	28 August 2015	Justice and Development Party
5	Yalçın Topçu	28 August 2015	17 November 2015	Independent
6	Mahir Ünal	24 November 2015	24 May 2016	Justice and Development Party
7	Nabi Avcı	24 May 2016	19 July 2017	Justice and Development Party
8	Numan Kurtulmuş	19 July 2017	10 July 2018	Justice and Development Party
9	Mehmet Nuri Ersoy	10 July 2018	Incumbent	Independent
