= 1997 Nationalist Movement Party Extraordinary Congress =

Nationalist Movement Party Extraordinary Congress, 1997
- 18 May and 6 July 1997
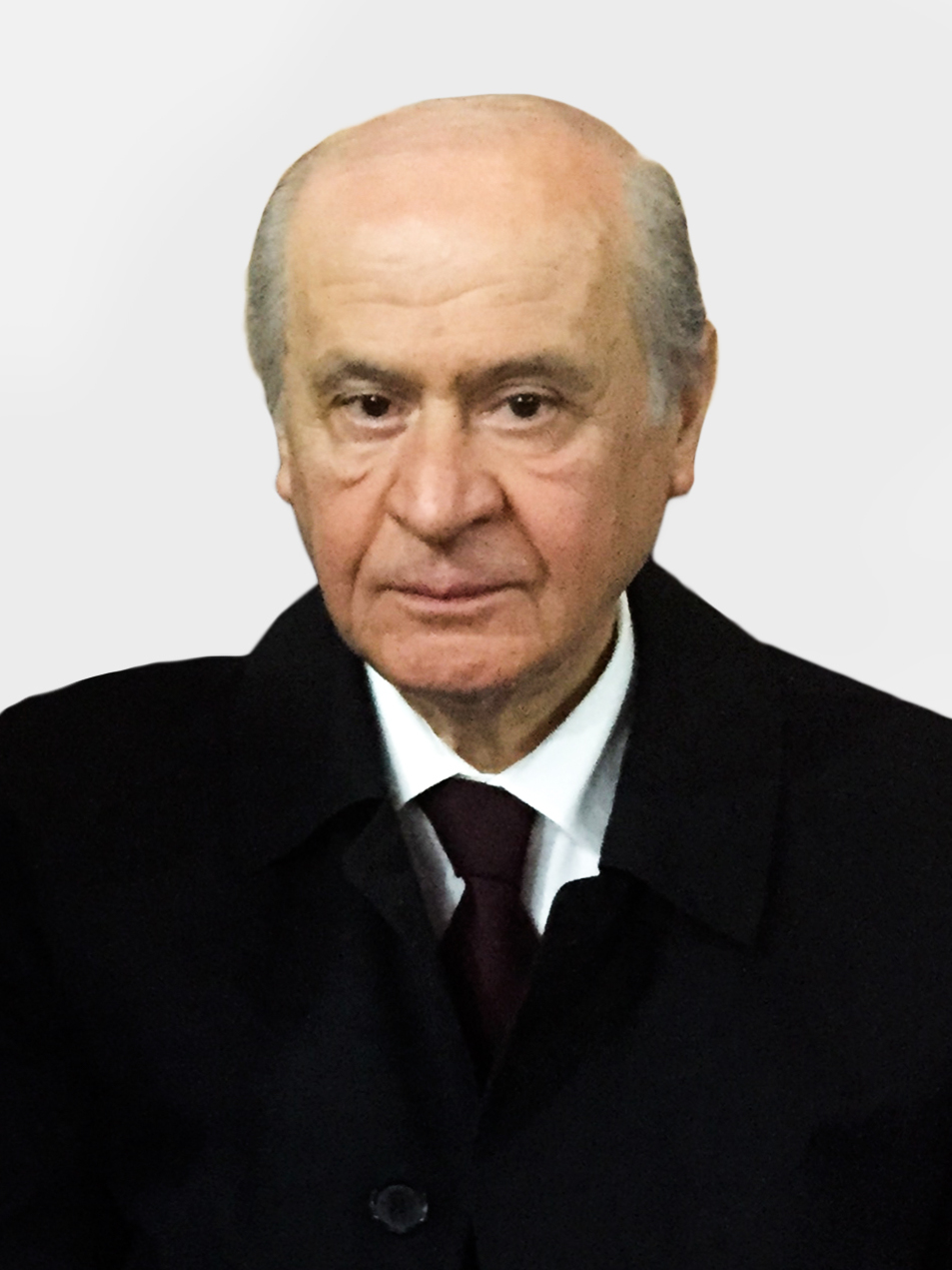
Candidate	Devlet Bahçeli	Yıldırım Tuğrul Türkeş
Party	MHP	MHP
Constituency	Osmaniye	Istanbul
Delegate vote	359 (4th congress); 697 (5th congress)	412 (4th congress); 483 (5th congress)
Percentage	29.9% (4th congress); 59.1 (5th congress)	34.4 (4th congress); 40.9% (5th congress)
Leader before election
Alparslan Türkeş
MHP
Elected Leader
Devlet Bahçeli
MHP

The 1997 Nationalist Movement Party Extraordinary Congress referred to two party conventions held by the Nationalist Movement Party (Turkish: Milliyetçi Hareket Partisi - MHP), a far-right ultranationalist political party in Turkey, following the death of their first leader Alparslan Türkeş. The first congress was held on 18 May 1997, where six candidates ran for the party leadership. Türkeş's eldest son, Tuğrul Türkeş emerged with a plurality of the vote while Devlet Bahçeli came second. The remaining candidates subsequently withdrew in support for Bahçeli, resulting in violence breaking out between party members supporting rival candidates. The second round was subsequently delayed until 6 July.

In their campaign speeches, Türkeş attacked Bahçeli for allegedly disrespecting the legacy of his father, whereas Bahçeli claimed that Türkeş's supporters did not have a place in the party. Devlet Bahçeli was elected in the second round with 697 delegates' votes as opposed to Türkeş's 483, prompting Türkeş to resign from the party and establish the Bright Turkey Party (ATP) in 1998. The ATP was dissolved in 2010 after Türkeş rejoined the MHP in 2007 and became a Member of Parliament for Istanbul in the 2007 general election.

== Results ==
=== 4th extraordinary congress, 18 May 1997 ===
Candidate	Votes	Percentage
Yıldırım Tuğrul Türkeş	412	34.4
Devlet Bahçeli	359	29.9
Ramiz Ongun	231	19.3
Enis Öksüz	104	8.7
Muharrem Şemsek	80	6.7
İbrahim Çiftçi	13	1.1
Total	1,199	100.0

=== 5th extraordinary congress, 6 July 1997 ===
Candidate	Votes	Percentage
Devlet Bahçeli	697	59.1
Yıldırım Tuğrul Türkeş	483	40.9
Total	1,180	100.0
