= Turkey in the UN Security Council =

Turkey has served as a non-permanent member of the UN Security Council (UNSC) on four occasions since its foundation in 1945. Its tenures were in 1951–52, 1954–55, 1961, and 2009–10. During these periods, Turkey actively participated in peacekeeping operations, crisis resolution, and global security discussions.

== Early Cold War period ==
Before the ascendancy of the Democrat Party in the 1950s, Turkey sought membership in the Council twice during the latter half of the 1940s; however, both attempts were unsuccessful. Although Turkey did not actively campaign for the seat, it was among the contenders during the elections held on 19 November 1946, in the General Assembly. During the elections, Turkey garnered a mere single vote, which, as reported by the Turkish media, originated from Syria. In the 1948 elections, Turkey faced competition from Egypt, which ultimately secured the required two-thirds majority of the UN members present and voting. Turkey also lost this second attempt.

During the early Cold War, international organizations became battlegrounds between the US and the Soviet Union, with smaller countries often acting as proxies. Turkey's involvement in UN Security Council elections in 1953 and 1959 was heavily influenced by US Cold War interests, resulting in a shift of its caucus from the Middle Eastern to Eastern European region. Turkey's voting record closely aligned with the US, marginalizing it among regional peers.

In the 1959 election, newly independent countries viewed Turkey's candidacy as a US tool to suppress alternative voices. This perception, combined with Turkey's voting behavior, led to increased support for Poland. Turkey's actions in the Security Council, such as during the Anglo-Iranian oil case, the Suez Crisis, and North African anti-colonial movements, prioritized Western allies' interests over regional concerns, further isolating the country. The Soviet Union capitalized on this, accusing Turkey of serving as a Western tool in the Middle East.

== 2009–2010 Membership ==
Turkey's membership in the UN Security Council during 2009–2010 led to a deterioration in relations between Ankara and Washington due to differences in their approach to various international issues. During this period, Turkey adopted a more independent and assertive foreign policy, diverging from the U.S. stance on key matters. This included Turkey's efforts to mediate the Iranian nuclear crisis, its opposition to U.S. and European-led sanctions against Iran, and its vote against additional sanctions in the Security Council. Furthermore, Turkey's increasing engagement with regional actors, such as Iran, Russia, and Syria, raised concerns in Washington over its geopolitical alignment. These developments fueled tensions between the two NATO allies and contributed to the decline in their bilateral relations during Turkey's term in the UN Security Council.

== 2014 Candidature ==
In contrast to the 2008 election, regional Muslim states presented the most significant challenge to Turkey's candidacy. Turkey's involvement in the Middle East following the Arab uprisings antagonized regional powers. Owing to Turkey's pro-Muslim Brotherhood stance, regional Muslim rivals, such as Saudi Arabia and Egypt, campaigned against Turkey's membership. Consequently, Turkey lost to Spain in the third round.
