= Cem Toker =

Turkish politician

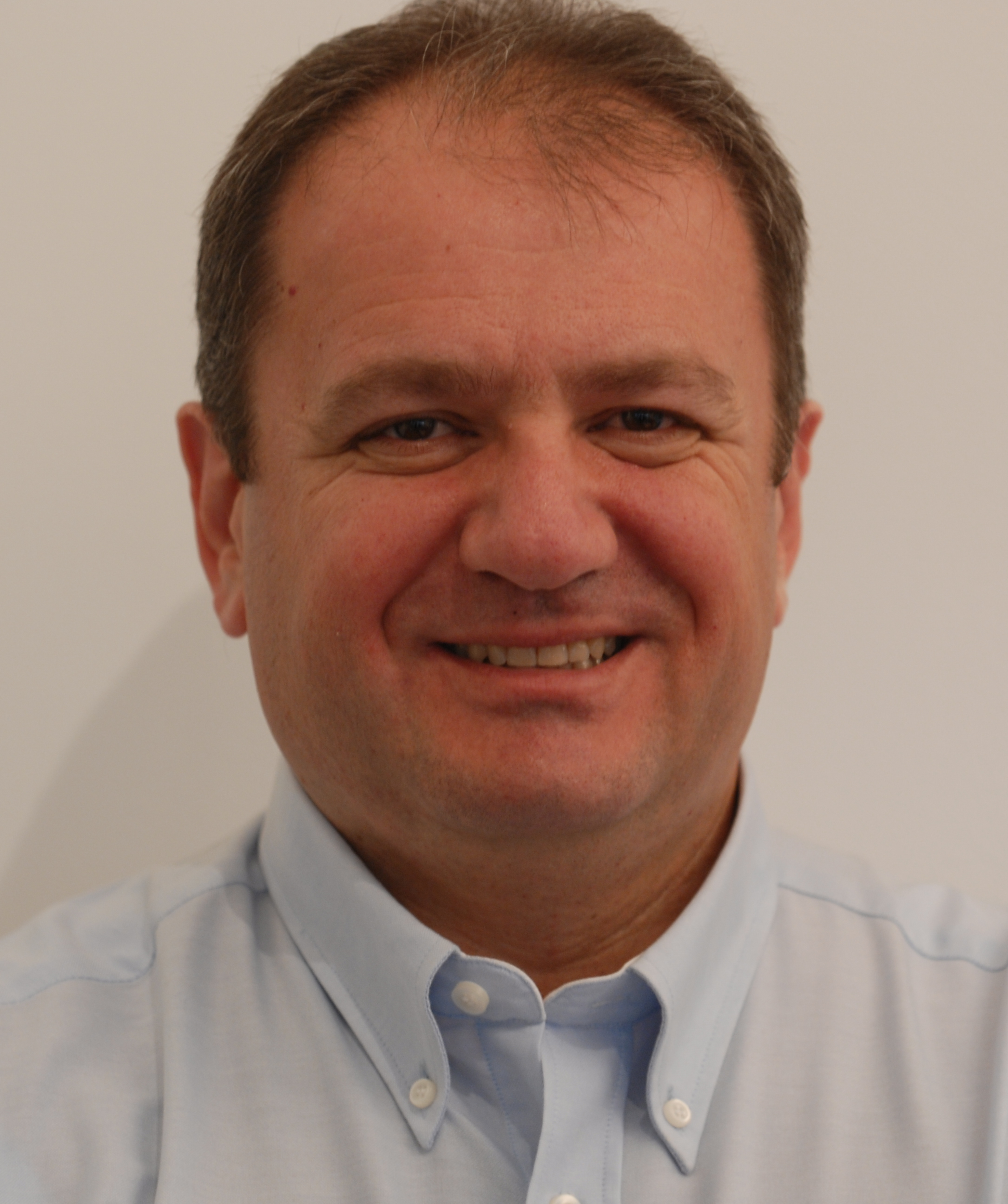

Leader of the Liberal Democratic Party
- In office 20 June 2005 – 29 January 2017
- Preceded by: Hakan Çizem
- Succeeded by: Gültekin Tırpancı

Personal details
- Born: July 5, 1957 (age 69) Istanbul
- Party: LDP
- Education: Arizona State University

Cem Toker (born July 5, 1957) is a Turkish politician, businessman, economist and the former leader of the Liberal Democratic Party of Turkey (Turkish: Liberal Demokrat Parti, LDP). He was elected in the fourth ordinary party congress on June 20, 2005.

== Early life and career ==
Toker was born in 1957 in Istanbul. He graduated from the British College, İstanbul and then earned his bachelor's degree in economics from Arizona State University.

He worked in the finance sector and formed a company offering international consultancy, guidance and language services.

Toker is married and has no children.

== Political career ==
His political career in the LDP started in 1996. Toker served as an executive and the chairman of the Istanbul branch of the LDP. He also served as the party's deputy secretary-general and secretary-general. From 2003 to 2005, he served as the deputy chairman of LDP. He was elected as the president of the party for the first time at the 4th ordinary congress of LDP in June 2005. He has been reelected twice in March 2008 and October 2010.

He was the architect of the LDP-led umbrella alliance offer in 2006. He offered an alliance to nine political parties from both left and right (including Anavatan and Demokratik Sol Parti) for the basic values of republicanism against the governing conservative party, AKP. The offer was still open in 2007 and in 2011 elections. In January 2017 he announced that he was stepping down as party leader and transferring the party leadership to Gültekin Tırpancı.

Party political offices
Preceded by Hakan Çizem	Leader of the Liberal Demokrat Parti (LDP); 2005–2017	Succeeded by Gültekin Tırpancı
