= Hüseyin Çelik =

Turkish politician (born 1959)

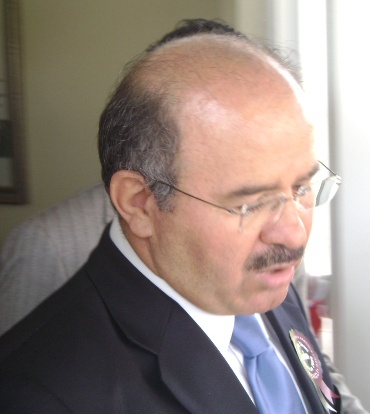

Minister of National Education
- In office 14 March 2003 – 1 May 2009
- Prime Minister: Recep Tayyip Erdoğan
- Preceded by: Erkan Mumcu
- Succeeded by: Nimet Çubukçu

Minister of Culture
- In office 19 November 2002 – 14 March 2003
- Prime Minister: Abdullah Gül
- Preceded by: Suat Çağlayan
- Succeeded by: Erkan Mumcu

Member of the Grand National Assembly
- In office 18 April 1999 – 7 June 2015
- Constituency: Van (1999, 2002, 2007); Gaziantep (2011)

Personal details
- Born: 5 March 1959 (age 67) Van, Turkey
- Party: Justice and Development Party (AKP) (2001–); True Path Party (DYP) (1999–2001)
- Spouse: Şahsenem Çelik
- Education: Istanbul University; University of London
- Website: HuseyinCelik.net

Hüseyin Çelik (born 5 March 1959 in Gürpınar, Van) is a Turkish former Minister of National Education of Turkey and member of parliament for Van for the Justice and Development Party (AKP).

== Background ==
Çelik was the first advisor of Recep Tayyip Erdogan and later became the minister of culture and tourism. After that, he became the Minister of National Education. He was the spokesperson of the Turkish Parliament and AKP. Also, in the past, Çelik graduated in Turkish language and literature from Istanbul University in 1983 and went on to a career as an academic at Van Yüzüncü Yıl Üniversitesi, eventually becoming assistant professor in 1997. From 1988-1991 he studied towards a master's degree in politics at the School of Oriental and African Studies in the University of London. His focus was on the late-Ottoman Empire writer and thinker Ali Suavi.

== Writer ==
During the 1990s he wrote a column on Ottoman era politics and other issues for the nationalist-leaning social and political science journal Türkiye Günlüğü. He has published 15 books on politics, culture, history etc. has also edited and annotated an edition of the work "Şinasi" by Ottoman writer Ziyad Ebuzziya.

== Political career ==
He was elected to parliament for Van as a member of Tansu Çiller's DYP in 1999, moving to the newly founded AK Party in 2001. He was elected parliamentary chief and then following the AK Party's election victory in 2002, he became Minister of Culture and then Minister of Education.

During his brief tenure as Minister of Culture he is remembered for immediately sacking the entire Board for the Protection of Culture and Nature (Turkish: Kültür ve Tabiat Varlıklarını Koruma Kurulu). Regional bodies set up to monitor archaeology and other research throughout the country, led by architect and champion of Anatolia's cultural heritage Oktay Ekinci, one of those dismissed. Çelik was then accused of taking this action under pressure from AK Party MP for Muğla Hasan Özyer in order to enable the Muğla coastline to be developed for mass-market tourism.

=== Minister of Education (2003 - 2009) ===
As Minister of Education as well as curriculum reform and all the day-to-day running of the school system, Çelik has had to deal with a number of issues including:

- pressure from the European Union to re-open the Greek Orthodox Halki seminary school in Istanbul.
- pressure from graduates and parents, the majority of them AK Party voters, to change the rules that currently limit graduates of the conservative Imam Hatip schools to studying only religious studies at university.
- a number of clashes with the Higher Education Board over issues ranging from the Imam Hatip issue to the appointment and dismissal of individual university rectors.

== Personal life ==
Çelik is of Arab descent on his father's side and of Kurdish descent on his mother's side. He claims to have descended from the Islamic prophet Muhammad through his father. He is married to Şahsenem Çelik and they have three children; Ali Ekrem, Enes, and Büşra Vuslat.

Political offices
Preceded by Erkan Mumcu	Minister of National Education of Turkey; 14 March 2003–1 May 2009	Succeeded by Nimet Çubukçu
Preceded by Suat Çağlayan	Minister of Culture of Turkey; November 19, 2002–March 14, 2003	Succeeded by Erkan Mumcu
