= Tuğrul Türkeş =

Turkish economist and politician

Tuğrul Türkeş MP

Deputy Prime Minister of Turkey
- In office 28 August 2015 – 19 July 2017
- Prime Minister: Ahmet Davutoğlu; Binali Yıldırım
- Serving with: Cevdet Yılmaz (2015); Yalçın Akdoğan (2015–16); Lütfi Elvan (2015–16); Veysi Kaynak; Nurettin Canikli; Numan Kurtulmuş; Mehmet Şimşek
- Preceded by: Bülent Arınç
- Succeeded by: Hakan Çavuşoğlu

Member of the Grand National Assembly
- Incumbent
- Assumed office 22 July 2007
- Constituency: Ankara (I) (2007, 2011, June 2015, Nov 2015, 2018, 2023)

Leader of the Bright Turkey Party
- In office 27 November 1998 – 15 December 2007
- Preceded by: Party established
- Succeeded by: Ahmet Bican Ercilasun

Personal details
- Born: Yıldırım Tuğrul Türkeş; 1 December 1954 (age 71) Ankara, Turkey
- Party: ATP (1998-2002); Independent (1997-1998, 2002-2007); MHP (1993-1997, 2007-2015); AK Party (2015–present)
- Relations: Alparslan Türkeş (father)
- Education: TED Ankara College; Hacettepe University
- Occupation: Politician
- Profession: Economist
- Cabinet: 63rd, 64th, 65th

Yıldırım Tuğrul Türkeş (born 1 December 1954) is a Turkish economist and politician, who served as Deputy Prime Minister of Turkey from 28 August 2015 to 19 July 2017. He first joined the interim election government formed by Prime Minister Ahmet Davutoğlu on 28 August 2015 as a Nationalist Movement Party (MHP) politician. He later defected to the Justice and Development Party (AKP) and was elected as an MP for the AKP in the November 2015 general election, continuing to serve as Deputy Prime Minister in the subsequent AKP majority government. He has been a Member of Parliament for Ankara's first electoral district since the 2007 general election and is the eldest son of the MHP's founder Alparslan Türkeş. He is the former leader of the Bright Turkey Party (ATP), which he led from 1997 to 2002.

Following unsuccessful coalition negotiations between political parties after the June 2015 general election resulted in a hung parliament, Türkeş was offered a ministerial position in the formation of an interim election cabinet. Although his party was entitled to three ministries in the interim cabinet, the MHP announced its intention to not take part. Despite his party's decision, Türkeş accepted the invitation, drawing strong criticism from his party. He was referred to the MHP Disciplinary Board on 27 August 2015 and was formally suspended from the MHP on 5 September 2015. With his suspension, the MHP was left with 79 seats in Parliament and fell behind the HDP to become the smallest parliamentary group.

== Early life and career ==
Yıldırım Tuğrul Türkeş was born on 1 December 1954 in Istanbul and is the eldest son of the MHP's founder Alparslan Türkeş. He graduated from the Department of Economics in the Hacettepe University Faculty of Economics and Administrative Sciences, after briefly studying architecture at the University of Ankara. He later became a press advisor to the Ministry of Trade and was a member of the executive board of the Ortadoğu newspaper. He was also a columnist for the newspapers Akşam, Son Havadis and the magazine Yeni Harman.

Active in trade fairs, Türkeş was also an executive board member of PETKİM AŞ and the Turkish Republic Development Bank. He served as deputy manager, manager and partner in numerous other companies.

== Early political career ==
=== MHP leadership bid and ATP leadership ===
He served in the Turkish Gendarmerie as a conscript between 1972 and 1974 and went on to become a senior Non-Commissioned officer in the Turkish Army Military Police or Askeri İnzibat, retiring in 1995 as a Astsubay Başçavuş or Battalion Second Sergeant-Major. During his military service he trained in Chile, Argentina, Sweden and with joint NATO forces in the UK. After the death of his father and MHP leader Alparslan Türkeş in 1997, Tuğrul Türkeş put forward his name for the party leadership in the subsequent extraordinary congress. He came first in the first round of voting, but failed to secure a sufficient number of votes to be elected outright. Before a second round of voting, many of his rivals abandoned their leadership bids to support Türkeş's rival Devlet Bahçeli. Bahçeli was subsequently elected, after which Türkeş resigned from the party.

Türkeş became a founding member of the new Bright Turkey Party (ATP) after resigning from the MHP, later becoming the party's leader. Before the 2002 general election, he opted to contest the election in an alliance with the True Path Party (DYP). However, when the DYP failed to surpass the 10% election threshold and lost all its parliamentary representation in the 2002 election, Türkeş resigned from the party and its leadership, announcing that he would leave active politics.

=== Political comeback, 2007 ===
Before the 2007 general election, Türkeş and his rival Bahçeli made amends and Türkeş was placed on the party's lists to contest Ankara's first electoral district. He was subsequently elected to parliament and was re-elected in 2011 and June 2015.

While in Parliament, he served in the Turkey-Northern Cyprus interparliamentary friendship group. He also served as a member of the MHP's central executive committee.

== Deputy Prime Minister ==
After the June 2015 general election resulted in a hung parliament, unsuccessful coalition negotiations raised speculation over whether President Recep Tayyip Erdoğan would call an early election in the event that AKP leader Ahmet Davutoğlu was unable to form a government within the given constitutional time of 45 days. As required by the 114th article of the Constitution of Turkey, the calling of a snap general election by the President necessitates the forming of an interim election government, in which all parties represented in Parliament are given a certain number of ministers according to how many MPs they have.

Erdoğan called a new general election for November 2015 in late August, with Davutoğlu being tasked with the formation of the interim government. Having sent invitations to three MHP politicians as required due to their 80 MPs, only Türkeş accepted the invitation. MHP leader Devlet Bahçeli was strongly against any participation in the government, resulting in heavy criticism of Türkeş by party colleagues. Davutoğlu, however, praised Türkeş for showing true statesmanship. Amid claims that Türkeş could be suspended from the MHP for disobeying the party executive, Davutoğlu appointed him Deputy Prime Minister of Turkey on 28 August 2015.

=== Suspension from the MHP ===
The MHP announced that it would not be taking part in the interim election government, in which the party was entitled to three ministerial positions (out of 26). This was attributed to the HDP pledging to take part, with the MHP actively pursuing a policy of distancing themselves from the HDP due to their widely varying ideologies of Turkish nationalism and Kurdish nationalism respectively.

Regardless, Ahmet Davutoğlu sent out invitations to MHP politicians Kenan Tanrıkulu and Meral Akşener along with Türkeş. Türkeş was the only politician to accept the invitation despite the party line being to decline. His decision caused uproar within the MHP with suspension proceedings beginning immediately after Türkeş accepted the invitation. Türkeş defended his decision saying that participating in the election government was a constitutional duty and that he had taken the MHP into government by virtue of doing so. On 5 September 2015, Türkeş was formally suspended from the MHP, with many media commentators noting how he had been suspended from a party that his father had founded. Before being suspended, the MHP had already removed his name from their list of MPs on their website and struck off his name from a lift floor guide in the party headquarters.

With his suspension, the MHP's seats in Parliament fell from 80 to 79, falling behind the HDP to become the smallest political group in Parliament. Nevertheless, Türkeş indicated that he might contest the decision to suspend him, stating that he could not be suspended from a party for fulfilling his constitutional duties.

=== Political misconduct allegations ===
Before being offered a position as a minister, it was revealed that a member of the MHP Leadership Council had attended a meeting with President Recep Tayyip Erdoğan after the temporary speaker Deniz Baykal had done so in July 2015. MHP leader Devlet Bahçeli claimed that he would suspend the MHP member who met with Erdoğan as soon as it became clear who it was. Despite publicly stating that it was not him, camera footage emerged of Türkeş entering and exiting the meeting with Erdoğan. However, since it was not clear at the time whether a coalition could be formed, it was alleged that Bahçeli did not suspend Türkeş so that the MHP could become the main opposition party in the event of an AKP-CHP grand coalition.

After accepting his role as a minister, rumours arose that Türkeş had over ₺1,000,000 in debt and had bought his son a luxury jeep worth ₺400,000. It was alleged that he had joined the government after being offered a large amount of money in return, with Türkeş denying all the rumours. It was also alleged that the AKP had camera recordings of Türkeş that they used as blackmail, to which Türkeş responded that he had never hidden the fact that he had a girlfriend and that if there was such a tape, then the individual who filmed it should be ashamed of themselves.

== See also ==
- Turkish nationalism
- Justice and Development Party
