= People's Ascent Party =

People's Ascent Party Halkın Yükselişi Partisi
- Leader: Ragıp Önder Günay
- Founded: 16 February 2005
- Dissolved: 26 February 2018
- Merged into: Association for Defence of National Rights Movement Party
- Ideology: Kemalism; Social democracy Centrism; Euroscepticism
- Political position: Centre-left
- Colours: White, Red, Green

The People's Ascent Party (Turkish: Halkın Yükselişi Partisi, abbreviated HYP) is a Turkish political party founded by the Istanbul MP and theologian Yaşar Nuri Öztürk on 16 February 2005, adopting the principles of a democratic state of law.

In its manifesto, the party claims to be an advocate of social democracy, seeking to benefit Turkey and the Turkish people on the basis of a participatory and pluralistic democratic platform.

On 22 November 2009, Ragıp Önder Günay was elected the new party leader in 4th convention of HYP.

On 26 February 2018, Party dissolved itself and joined the Association for Defence of National Rights Movement Party.
