= Erbakan =

Erbakan is a Turkish surname. Notable people with the surname include:

- Necmettin Erbakan (1926-2011), Prime Minister of Turkey (1996–1997), first Islamic prime minister
- Fatih Erbakan (born 1979), Turkish politician; son of Necmettin Erbakan
