= Ertuğrul Günay =

Turkish politician (born 1948)

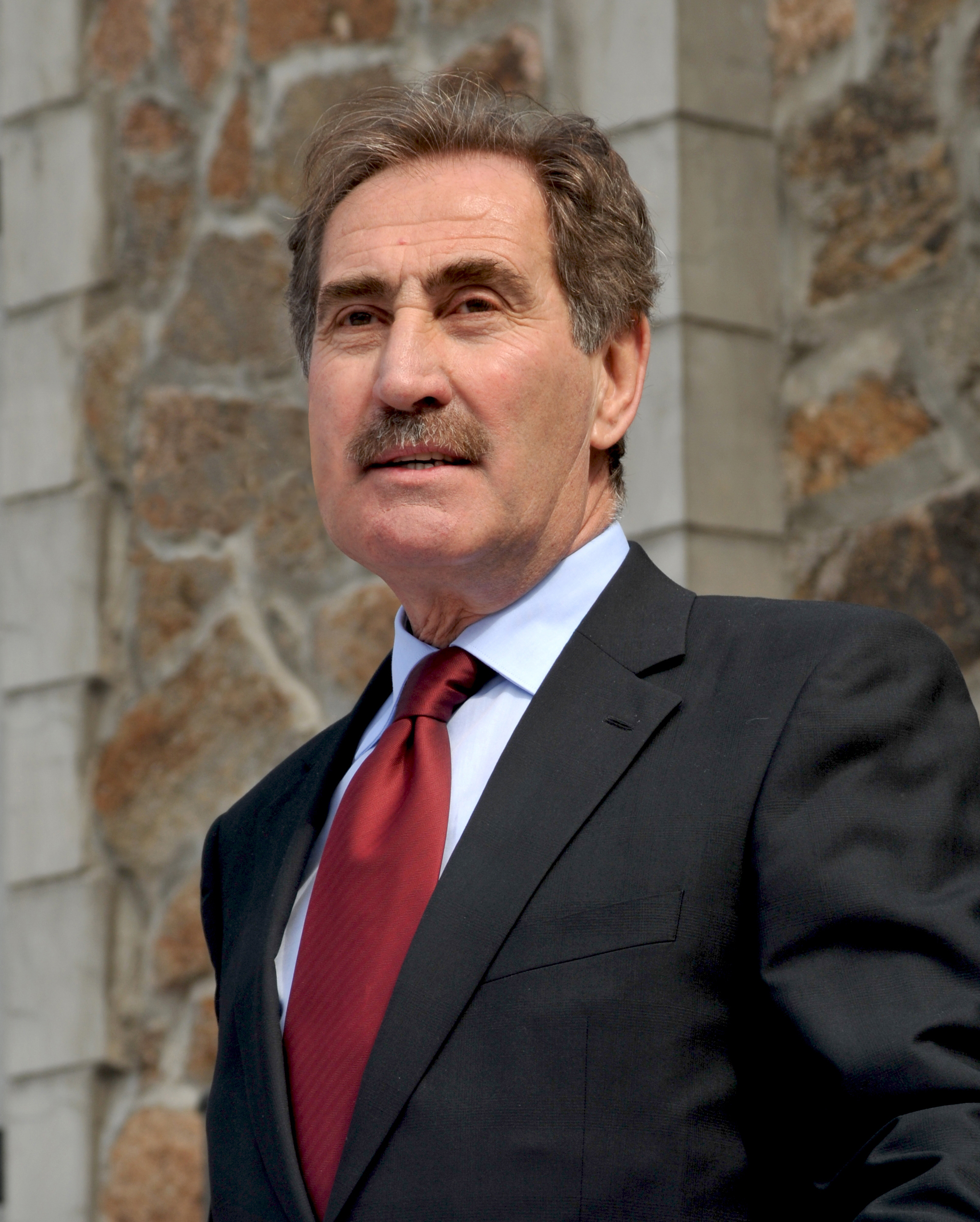

Minister of Culture and Tourism
- In office 29 August 2007 – 24 January 2013
- Prime Minister: Recep Tayyip Erdoğan
- Preceded by: Atilla Koç
- Succeeded by: Ömer Çelik

Member of the Grand National Assembly
- In office 22 July 2007 – 7 June 2015
- Constituency: Istanbul (I) (2007), Izmir (I) (2011)
- In office 5 June 1977 – 12 September 1980
- Constituency: Ordu (1977)

Personal details
- Born: 1 March 1948 (age 78) Ordu, Turkey
- Party: CHP (1977-2004); AKP (2007-2013)
- Spouse: Gülten Günay
- Children: İnanç, Pınar
- Education: Law
- Alma mater: Istanbul University
- Profession: Lawyer, politician

Ertuğrul Günay (born 1 March 1948) is a Turkish politician. He served as the Minister of Culture and Tourism of Turkey between 29 August 2007 and 24 January 2013.

== Biography ==
Günay graduated from Istanbul University Faculty of Law with a degree of bachelor of laws in 1969. In the election in 1977, he became the youngest member of parliament to be elected to the Turkish Grand National Assembly, as a member of the Republican People's Party (CHP). Within the CHP, he rose to the position of Secretary General in 1992, but was expelled in 2004, following clashes with CHP leader Deniz Baykal.

He joined the AKP (Justice and Development Party) upon his objection to anti-democratic tendencies emerging prior to the elections in 2007. He was elected as a member of parliament from Istanbul in 2007, then re-elected from İzmir in 2011. On 29 August 2007, Günay was appointed Minister of Culture and Tourism.

Günay led some civil initiatives particularly the "Humanitarian Initiative for Bosnia", the "Eastern Conference" and the "New Political Initiative". He is the author of Bosnian Writings and Counter Politics and has numerous published articles and interviews about law and politics as well.

On 24 January 2013, he was replaced by Ömer Çelik at his post in the cabinet.

== Recognitions ==
Günay received an honorary PhD degree from Adıyaman University in 2009 for his contributions to the peace and freedom of thought, and other honorary PhD degrees in 2011 from Pamukkale in Denizli, Mustafa Kemal in Antakya and Akdeniz University in Antalya for the protection of cultural heritage and support for studies in archeology.

Günay was awarded with Hungarian Order of Merit from the Hungarian Republic for improving bilateral cultural relations between the two countries, as well as the Grand Decoration of Honour In Gold With Sash by the Republic of Austria, the highest to be bestowed in Turkey.

== Family life ==
He is married and is the father of two children.

Political offices
Preceded by Atilla Koç	Minister of Culture and Tourism; 29 August 2007– 24 January 2013	Succeeded by Ömer Çelik
