= Atilla Koç =

Turkish politician (born 1946)

Minister of Culture and Tourism
- In office 21 February 2005 – 29 August 2007
- Prime Minister: Abdullah Gul
- Preceded by: Erkan Mumcu
- Succeeded by: Ertuğrul Günay

Personal details
- Born: March 1, 1946 (age 80) Aydın, Turkey
- Children: Zehra Zümrüt Selçuk

Atilla Koç (born March 1, 1946) is a Turkish politician of the Justice and Development Party. He was the Minister of Culture and Tourism in the first cabinet of Recep Tayyip Erdogan.

After graduating from Ankara University, he worked in the Ministry of Interior and Konya Police Department. He served as district governor in Ulubey, Nusaybin and Bayındır, then as provincial governor of Siirt and Giresun.

He is married and has three children.

Political offices
Preceded by Erkan Mumcu	Minister of Culture and Tourism; February 21, 2005– August 29, 2007	Succeeded by Ertuğrul Günay
