= Association for Defence of National Rights Movement Party =

Turkish political party

Association for Defence of National Rights Movement Party Müdafaa-i Hukuk Hareketi Partisi
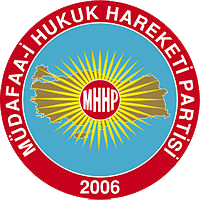
- Abbreviation: MNNP
- Chairman: Ufuk Erdüvenci
- Secretary-General: Ergun Güçdemir
- Founded: 24 April 2006
- Headquarters: Ankara, Turkey
- Membership (2026): ▼105
- Slogan: Anadolu'da Doğan Güneş (The Rising Sun in Anatolia)

The Association for Defence of National Rights Movement Party (Turkish: Müdafaa-i Hukuk Hareketi Partisi, abbreviated MHHP) is a political party in Turkey.

== See also ==
- List of political parties in Turkey
