= Besim Tibuk =

Turkish businessman and former politician

Chairman of the Liberal Democratic Party
- In office 26 July 1994 – 25 November 2002
- Preceded by: office founded
- Succeeded by: Nizam Kağıtçıbaşı (deputy)

Personal details
- Born: Besim Tibukoğlu; 14 April 1946 (age 80) Arılı, Fındıklı, Rize, Turkey
- Party: Liberal Democratic Party
- Profession: Tourism, businessman

Besim Tibuk (born 14 April 1946 in Fındıklı) is a Turkish businessman and former politician. He is the chairman of the board of directory of Net Holding, and the founder and the ex-chairman of the Liberal Democratic Party (LDP).

He was born in 1946 at Arılı village of Fındıklı district of Rize as the child of a family of Laz origin. He completed his primary education in Murgul and secondary education in Kars, Artvin, and İzmit. He went to the United States with 1962–1963 AFS scholarship. He finished his high school education in the US. In 1968, he graduated from Ankara University, Faculty of Political Sciences, Department of Diplomacy (now Ankara University, Faculty of Political Sciences, Department of International Relations). He worked at the State Institute of Statistics between 1964 and 1967. In 1971–1972, he completed his master's degree in the Business Administration Specialization Program at the Institute of Business Economics of Istanbul University.

== Business career ==
Besim Tibuk entered the tourism sector in 1964 as a translator guide. Later, he worked at management of travel agencies. He later founded Net Tourism, the core of Net Holding, by organizing translator guides in 1974. Net Tourism became one of the largest establishments in the tourism sector of Turkey in a short time.

After leaving active politics, Besim Tibuk moved to Northern Cyprus and now owns 6 hotels under Net Holding in there.

== Political career ==
Beginning to be actively involved in politics, Tibuk first established the DEM publishing house to serve democratic culture. He took part in the re-establishment of the Democrat Party and served as the party's provincial chairman of Istanbul for a while. On 26 July 1994, he left Democrat Party with his friends and founded the Liberal Democratic Party (LDP). Tibuk left active politics by resigning from the chairmanship on 25 November 2002 due to insufficient support for LDP in 1999 and 2002 elections. He left his office to Nizam Kağıtçıbaşı.

He was proposed as the candidate by the Liberal Democrat Party before the 2014 presidential elections, but failed to receive the support of 20 congressman required to be nominated.

Tibuk is a vocal critic of the republican regime established in Turkey in 1923 for a lack of democracy, stating that a republic without democracy is useless, and that republic is good only if it is a democracy. He also said that constitutional monarchy is often much more democratic.

== Personal life ==
Tibuk is a father of 4 children. His two marriages ended in divorce.
