= Salih Uzun =

Turkish politician (born 1970)

Salih Uzun MP
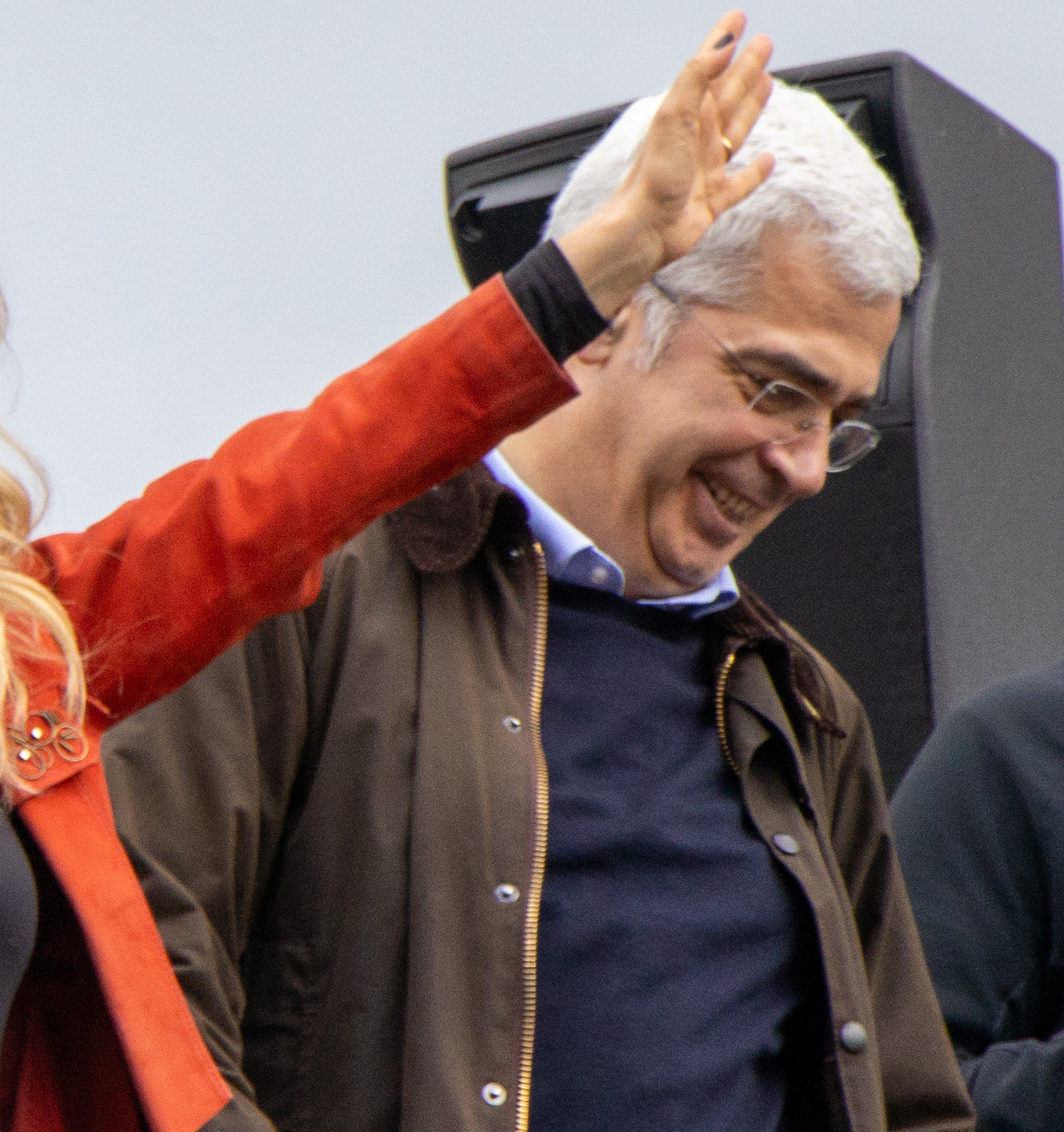

Member of the Grand National Assembly
- Incumbent
- Assumed office 2 June 2023
- Constituency: İzmir (II) (2023)

Deputy Chairman of the Democrat Party
- In office 31 October 2009 – 15 January 2011
- Preceded by: Position established
- Succeeded by: Position abolished

Leader of the Motherland Party
- In office 26 October 2008 – 31 October 2009
- Preceded by: Erkan Mumcu
- Succeeded by: Position abolished

Deputy Leader of the Motherland Party
- In office 2005–2008

President of the Motherland Party Youth wing
- In office 1993–1997

Personal details
- Born: Mehmet Salih Uzun; 1970 (age 55–56) Gölcük, Kocaeli, Turkey
- Party: Motherland Party (1993–2009); Democrat Party (2009–2024); Independent (2024–2025); Republican People's Party (2025–Present)

Mehmet Salih Uzun (born 1970) is a Turkish politician and former and final leader of the Motherland Party (Anavatan Partisi, ANAP).

== Biography ==
Uzun was born in the northwestern Anatolian town of Gölcük in Kocaeli Province. He graduated from the Ankara University's Faculty of Political Sciences. After receiving his Master's degree from the same university, Uzun completed his PhD at Selçuk University.

Salih Uzun was elected 7th president of ANAP at the party congress on October 26, 2008. He served as leader until October 2009 when Motherland Party was merged to Democratic Party. He is succeeded by Hüsamettin Cindoruk, who is the leader of Democrat Party. He left the leadership in 2011.

In 2023 Turkish parliamentary elections, he was elected as a member Grand National Assembly of Turkey for İzmir. Although he was a member of the Democrat Party, he was elected via CHP list. In 2024, he resigned from the party and became independent. At a TV programme on 2 February 2025, he announced he is going to join Republican People's Party on 4 February 2025. and he joined the CHP on 4 February 2025.

He is married and has a child.

Party political offices
Preceded by Erkan Mumcu	Leader of the Motherland Party (ANAP); 2008–2009	Succeeded by Hüsamettin Cindoruk (Democratic Party)
