= Gültekin Uysal =

Turkish politician

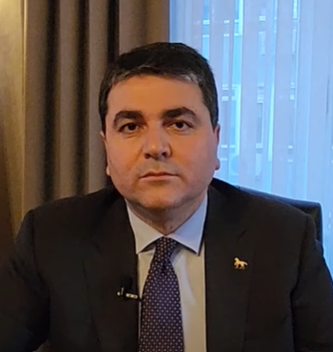

Member of the Grand National Assembly
- In office 7 July 2018 – 7 April 2023
- Constituency: Afyonkarahisar (2018)

Leader of the Democrat Party
- Incumbent
- Assumed office 6 May 2012
- Preceded by: Namik Kemal Zeybek

Personal details
- Born: 1976 (age 49–50) İscehisar, Afyon, Turkey
- Party: Democrat Party
- Spouse: Hatice Uysal
- Children: 2
- Education: Bilkent University
- Profession: Politician

Gultekin Uysal (born 1976) is a Turkish politician and businessman who has been the chairman of the Democrat Party (DP), since May 2012. In 2018 election he was elected on the İYİ Party list but then he rejoined his party.

== Biography ==
Gültekin Uysal was born in 1976 in İscehisar, Afyonkarahisar Province, Turkey. He graduated from Department of Political Science and Public Administration at Bilkent University.
