= Liberal Democratic Party (Turkey) =

Liberal Democratic Party Liberal Demokrat Parti
- Abbreviation: LDP
- Leader: Gültekin Tırpancı
- General Secretary: Meryem Aydın
- Spokesperson: Merve Karataş
- Founder: Besim Tibuk
- Founded: 26 July 1994; 32 years ago
- Headquarters: Yüzüncü Yıl Mahallesi No:35/1 Çankaya/Ankara
- Youth wing: Young Dolphins (unofficial)
- Membership (2026): ▼2,858
- Ideology: Classical liberalism; Liberal democracy; Economic liberalism; Pro-Europeanism
- Political position: Center to center-right
- Colours: Blue; White; Dark Blue (customary)
- Slogan: • Özgürlüğümü seviyorum! (I love my freedom!) • Sana güveniyor! (Believes in you!)

Website
- https://www.ldp.org.tr/

Liberal Democratic Party (Turkish: Liberal Demokrat Parti, LDP) is a classical liberal party in Turkey. LDP was founded in 1994 as “Liberal Parti” by Turkish entrepreneur Besim Tibuk. According to data published in January 2024, the party has 3,601 members.

Tibuk was the advisor of Turkish President Turgut Özal until Özal died on 17 April 1993. After the death of Turgut Özal, Besim Tibuk decided to found a new party to emphasize the liberal movement in Turkey. Tibuk first founded the party as "Liberal Party", but following the "1994 Liberal Democratic Party Ordinary Congress" the party's name then changed from the Liberal Party to "Liberal Democratic Party". After the failure of his party in the 2002 general elections, Tibuk resigned on 25 November 2002, leaving his office to Nizam Kağıtçıbaşı, who only remained 48 days in office and got voted out by Ercan Çalı. Çalı remained in office for 336 days, before eventually getting replaced by member of the Grand National Assembly Emin Şirin, who had resigned from AKP and joined the Liberal Democratic Party on 14 October 2003 in the party's 1st Extraordinary Congress. Later on, Emin Şirin announced his resignation from the chairmanship and party membership on 13 February 2004 due to differences of opinion with the party, and thus, between 14 December 2003 and 13 February 2004, the party was represented in the Turkish Grand National Assembly for the first and last time in its history. Hakan Çizem took over the vacant seat to remain chairman of the party until 20 June 2005. Çizem was later voted out by Cem Toker who remained the leader of LDP from 20 June 2005 to 29 January 2017. Since then, Gültekin Tırpancı has been the leader of the party. Some of LDP's current political views include reducing government spending and taxes, lowering tax rates, reducing government bureaucracy, abolishing the compulsory General Health Insurance and switching to a voluntary private health insurance system, ending compulsory military service and switching to professional military service.

LDP announced in the following years that there were no youth branches and women's branches in the party due to the principles of not making age and gender discrimination in the administration. However, the youth group called "Genç Yunuslar" (Young Dolphins) continues to exist even though it is not considered an official organization by LDP. Unlike other parties in Turkish politics, the party uses a humorous language on its official Twitter accounts.

LDP is the first party in Turkey to advocate for the legalization of marijuana.

== Policies ==
=== Presidential system ===
LDP advocates changing Turkey's parliamentary system, arguing that it brings political instability and believes that the U.S. style presidential system with two round system should be implemented. LDP also supported the "No!” vote in the 2017 Turkish constitutional referendum, arguing that proposed amendments have nothing related with presidential system.

=== SMB's ===
LDP supports low taxation. The party believes that only three types of taxes should be implemented; income tax, which it believes that it should be levied on businesses employing more than 5 people, consumption tax, which it believes that it should be levied only on the end consumer, and property tax, to finance municipal costs.

LDP supports the abolition of government agencies such as the SBB and supports the simplification of company establishment and closure procedures. LDP opposes all government agency enforced taxes. LDP supports the abolition of compulsory membership in chambers of industry and commerce.

=== LGBT rights ===
LDP believes that LGBT rights fall within the scope of individual freedoms, and advocates tax exemption for donations made to non-governmental organisations providing education on LGBT rights and supports increased penalties for violence against LGBT people. LDP has also stated that it supports pride parades in Turkey.

=== Women's rights ===
LDP supports increased penalties for violence against women and advocates tax exemption for donations to non-governmental organisations providing education on women's rights.

=== TRT ===
In his 1999 pre-election propaganda speech, which was going to be broadcast on TRT, LDP leader Tibuk stated he would sell everything as an election promise, including TRT. The quote later became an internet meme, mainly being used by liberals across Turkey.

== Party leaders ==
#	Leader	Portrait	Took office	Left office	Time in office
1	Besim Tibuk		26 July 1994	25 November 2002	8 years, 122 days
2	Nizam Kağıtçıbaşı		25 November 2002	12 January 2003	48 days
3	Ercan Çalı		12 January 2003	14 December 2003	336 days
4	Emin Şirin		14 December 2003	13 February 2004	61 days
5	Hakan Çizem		13 February 2004	20 June 2005	1 year, 127 days
6	Cem Toker		20 June 2005	29 January 2017	11 years, 223 days
7	Gültekin Tırpancı		29 January 2017	Incumbent	9 years, 297 days

== Elections ==
Election date	Party leader	Total votes	Percentage of the total votes	Deputies (number)
1999 Turkish general election	Besim Tibuk	127,174	0.4%	0/550
2002 Turkish general election	Besim Tibuk	89,177	0.3%	0/550
2007 Turkish general election	Cem Toker	36,717	0.1%	0/550
2011 Turkish general election	Cem Toker	15,599	0.04%	0/550
June 2015 Turkish general election	Cem Toker	27,167	0.06%	0/550
November 2015 Turkish general election	Cem Toker	26,816	0.1%	0/550
2018 Turkish general election	Gültekin Tırpancı	Not eligible to contest		0/600
2023 Turkish general election	Gültekin Tırpancı	Not eligible to contest		0/600

=== 2014 local elections ===
LDP won its first mayoralty in local elections in 2014 in the town of Konakkuran in the Malazgirt district of Muş. Bülent Ateş, who came first in the elections, stated that he did not believe in liberal ideology and that he ran as a candidate from the LDP only because its emblem was a memorable party, and later switched to the Democratic Regions Party along with his 5 council members. After 5 out of 12 council members switched to the Democratic Regions Party with Bülent Ateş, one council member in Ağrı, Patnos switched to the conservative Justice and Development Party.

=== 2023 general elections ===
For the 2023 elections, the LDP made the following statement: "Although our economic views do not match, within the framework of the current conditions and discourses, we declare to the public that our support is in favor of the Nation Alliance for respect for the law, modern secular democracy and a transparent parliament."

== See also ==
- Classical liberalism
- Libertarianism
- Contributions to liberal theory
- Liberalism worldwide
- List of liberal parties
- Liberal democracy
- Liberalism in Turkey
- List of political parties in Turkey
