= Bright Turkey Party =

Bright Turkey Party Aydınlık Türkiye Partisi
- Leader: Tuğrul Türkeş
- Founded: 27 October 1998
- Dissolved: 11 April 2010
- Split from: Nationalist Movement Party (MHP)
- Merged into: Nationalist Movement Party (MHP)
- Ideology: Turkish nationalism National conservatism Idealism
- Political position: Far-right
- Colors: Yellow and Blue

Bright Turkey Party (Turkish: Aydınlık Türkiye Partisi, ATP) was a right-wing populist party founded on 27 November 1998 by Tuğrul Türkeş. The party did not take part in the general elections of 1999. The party polled 0.29% of the vote in the 2007 Turkish general elections. The party dissolved on 11 April 2010.
