= Democrat Party (Turkey, 2007) =

Political party in Turkey, current

Democrat Party Demokrat Parti
- Abbreviation: DP
- President: Gültekin Uysal
- Founder: Mehmet Ağar
- Deputy Chairman: Salih Uzun; Office abolished
- Founded: 27 May 2007
- Preceded by: True Path Party
- Headquarters: Sadık Ahmet Cad. no:3, Balgat, Ankara
- Membership (2026): ▼302,852
- Ideology: Liberal conservatism; Turkish nationalism; Kemalism; Right-wing populism; Parliamentarism; Pro-Europeanism
- Political position: Centre-right
- National affiliation: Nation Alliance (2018-2023)
- Colours: Red (official); Purple (customary)
- Slogan: Başka Bir Türkiye Mümkün (Another Turkey is Possible)
- Grand National Assembly: 1 / 600
- District municipalities: 1 / 922
- Belde Municipalities: 2 / 388
- Municipal Assemblies: 55 / 20,952

Party flag

Website
- www.dp.org.tr

The Democrat Party (Turkish: Demokrat Parti), abbreviated to DP, is a liberal conservative Turkish political party, established by Ahmet Nusret Tuna in 1983 as the True Path Party (Turkish: Doğru Yol Partisi or DYP). It succeeded the historical Democrat Party and the Justice Party, two parties with similar ideologies. Their sister party is the Good Party.

The DYP is seen as a centre-right party. DYP's history spans back to the historical conservative Democrat Party, established in 1946 with the introduction of a multi-party system in Turkish politics. There have been four DYP governments since its foundation; one led by Süleyman Demirel, the other three by Turkey's first and only female Prime Minister, Tansu Çiller. The party now has two seats in the Grand National Assembly, elected in the lists of the Good Party during the 2018 general election.

On 5 May 2007, it was announced that DYP and the Motherland Party (ANAP) would merge to form the Democrat Party (Demokrat Parti). For that occasion, DYP renamed itself (based on the historical Democrat Party), and it was planned that ANAP would join the newly founded DP. Shortly before the election, however, the merging attempt failed. However, ANAP stated it would not contest the upcoming elections. After the DP only got about 6% of the votes in the 2007 general election, Ağar resigned as party leader. DYP and the Motherland Party eventually merged in November 2009.

The modern DP's logo, a horse upon a red background, derives from the popular mispronunciation of its name, Demokrat Parti. The word Demokrat did not readily roll off the tongue of rural voters, who found it easier to say Demir Kırat, the "iron white horse" of the Epic of Koroghlu. After the renaming in mid-2007, the logo became a white horse on a red map of Turkey in order to evoke this mondegreen.

== History ==
=== Background ===
The DYP's predecessor was the Democrat Party (Turkish: Demokrat Parti, DP), which was a conservative party responsible for relaxing Turkey's strict secularism laws. The party was suppressed in the 1960 military coup d'état and later reestablished as the Justice Party (Adalet Partisi, AP), which was disbanded in the coup of 1980.

Both parties staunchly rivaled the social democratic Republican People's Party (CHP). The military overthrew their governments on several occasions: In 1960, the Adnan Menderes government was deposed and Menderes himself was executed; on March 26, 1971, the government of party veteran Demirel was threatened with military intervention and forced to resign; and on September 12, 1980, the military carried out a full-scale coup, suppressing all political parties, including Demirel's AP.

=== Early history (1983–1991) ===
In 1983, Demirel created the True Path Party (Turkish: Doğru Yol Partisi, DYP), the successor of the AP – still conservative, but now with a secular-leaning policy instead of a religious-leaning one. Even so, the military and conservative governments banned the new party, and the DYP was declared illegal and its members were persecuted. Finally, in 1987, the party was legalized, and entered Turkish politics for the first time. It was hugely successful.

=== DYP in government (1991–1997) ===
In the 1991 general elections, the DYP defeated the Motherland Party (Turkish: Anavatan Partisi, ANAP) and the Social Democratic Populist Party (SHP), forming a coalition government with the SHP. Süleyman Demirel became Prime Minister once again. After Demirel was elected Turkey's 9th President, following the death of Turgut Özal, the party leadership was taken over by Tansu Çiller, who became the country's first woman Prime Minister.

In 1995, the coalition with the SHP, now merged with the Republican People's Party (CHP), collapsed. After the December 1995 elections, the weakened DYP formed first a coalition with ANAP, led by Mesut Yılmaz. Then, in June 1996, the DYP switched allegiances to form Turkey's first Islamist government with the Welfare Party's leader Necmettin Erbakan.

=== DYP in opposition (1999–2007) ===
In 1997, with the so-called "post-modern coup", the military effected the RP-DYP government's resignation. In the meantime, the DYP had been weakened by the effects of the Susurluk scandal. DYP and others expected to form a government under Çiller, but President Süleyman Demirel asked ANAP leader Mesut Yılmaz to form the new government instead, and the DYP was not included.

In 1998, the DYP took a turn for the worse. The DYP then had heavy recruitment among police intelligence.

The DYP secured 9.55% of the vote in the November 2002 general election, slightly under the 10% election threshold to enter parliament. However, a number of independents later joined the party, and, in November 2004, they had 4 seats in Turkey's 549-seat parliament. The figure hardly made the DYP a driving force in Turkish politics, but it remained Turkey's third largest party and particularly influential in rural areas.

Tansu Çiller resigned as party leader following the 2002 election defeat; she was eventually replaced by Mehmet Ağar.

=== Democrat Party (2007–present) ===
On 5 May 2007, it was announced that DYP and the Motherland Party (ANAP) would merge to form the Democrat Party (Turkish: Demokrat Parti). For that occasion, DYP renamed itself (based on the previous party of the same name), and it was planned that ANAP would join the newly founded DP. Shortly before the election, however, the merging attempt failed. Reasons included the re-entry of Mesut Yılmaz into the ANAP, which met with strong resistance from the ANAP leader Erkan Mumcu. However, ANAP stated it would not contest the upcoming elections.

After the DP only got about 6% of the votes in the 2007 election, Ağar resigned as party leader. At the 10th party congress held on January 15, 2011, in Ankara, Namık Kemal Zeybek was elected as the party leader. After Zeybek's resignation, Gültekin Uysal has become the party leader.

In the 2018 elections, the party participated in the Nation Alliance with the Republican People's Party, the Good Party, and the Felicity Party.

== Election results ==
=== Parliamentary elections ===
Grand National Assembly of Turkey
Year	Leader	Seats		Position
Year	Leader	Seats	+/-	Position
2007	Mehmet Ağar	0 / 550		Extra-parliamentary
2011	Süleyman Soylu	0 / 550		Extra-parliamentary
June 2015	Gültekin Uysal	0 / 550		Extra-parliamentary
November 2015	Gültekin Uysal	0 / 550		Extra-parliamentary
2018	Gültekin Uysal	1 / 600	▲1	Opposition
2023	Gültekin Uysal	3 / 600	▲2	Opposition

== See also ==
- Politics of Turkey
- List of political parties in Turkey
- True Path Party (2007)
- Justice Party (Turkey, 2015)
- Great Turkey Party
