= Erkan Mumcu =

Turkish politician (born 1963)

Leader of the Motherland Party
- In office 2 April 2005 – 26 October 2008
- Preceded by: Halil İbrahim Özsoy
- Succeeded by: Salih Uzun

Minister of Culture and Tourism of Turkey
- In office 14 March 2003 – 15 February 2005
- Prime Minister: Abdullah Gül
- Preceded by: Position established
- Succeeded by: Atilla Koç

Minister of National Education of Turkey
- In office 18 November 2002 – 14 March 2003
- Prime Minister: Abdullah Gül
- Preceded by: Necdet Tekin
- Succeeded by: Hüseyin Çelik

Minister of Tourism of Turkey
- In office 28 May 1999 – 8 August 2001
- Prime Minister: Bulent Ecevit
- Preceded by: Ahmet Tan
- Succeeded by: Mustafa Rüştü Taşar

Personal details
- Born: May 1, 1963 (age 63) Yalvaç, Isparta, Turkey
- Party: Motherland Party (1995-2002, 2005-2009); Justice and Development Party (2002-2005); Democrat Party (2009-present)

Erkan Mumcu (born May 1, 1963) is a Turkish politician and the sixth leader of the Motherland Party (Anavatan Partisi, ANAP).

== Biography ==
Mumcu was born in the western Anatolian town of Yalvaç in Isparta Province. His father was Süleyman and his mother was Cemile. He graduated from the Istanbul University's Faculty of Law.

He entered politics in 1995 as deputy of Isparta from the Motherland Party. In 1997–1998, Erkan Mumcu served as secretary general and in 1998–1999, he was vice president of the party. He became a member in the coalition government of Bülent Ecevit as Minister for Tourism serving from May 28, 1999 to August 8, 2001.

He joined the Justice and Development Party and was reelected from Isparta in the 2002 elections into the parliament. In the cabinet of Prime Minister Abdullah Gül, he was first the Minister of National Education and then the Minister of Culture and Tourism.

After a dispute with Recep Tayyip Erdoğan, he resigned on February 15, 2005, and joined the Motherland Party again. Erkan Mumcu was elected 6th president of ANAP at the extraordinary party congress on April 2, 2005. On October 25, 2008, Mumcu resigned the leadership of the Motherland Party.

He is married and father of two children.

Political offices
Preceded by Hüseyin Çelik; Güldal Akşit	Minister of Culture and Tourism of Turkey; March 14, 2003–February 15, 2005	Succeeded by Atilla Koç
Preceded by Necdet Tekin	Minister of Education of Turkey; November 19, 2002–March 17, 2003	Succeeded by Hüseyin Çelik
Preceded by Ahmet Tan	Minister of Tourism of Turkey; May 28, 1999–August 8, 2001	Succeeded by Mustafa Taşar
Party political offices
Preceded by Nesrin Nas	Leader of the Motherland Party (ANAP); April 2, 2005–October 26, 2008	Succeeded by Salih Uzun
