= Namık Kemal Zeybek =

Turkish politician

Chairman of the Democratic Party
- In office 2011–2012
- Preceded by: Hüsamettin Cindoruk
- Succeeded by: Gültekin Uysal

Personal details
- Born: 1944 (age 81–82) Bayburt, Turkey
- Party: Democratic Party
- Education: Ankara University
- Profession: Politician, jurist & former civil servant

Namık Kemal Zeybek (born 1944) is a Turkish politician and was leader of the Democratic Party (2011 - 2012). A former civil servant and district governor, he was government minister in different cabinets.

He was born 1944 in the village of Kitre in Bayburt Province, northeastern Turkey. He graduated in 1966 from the Law School of Ankara University. After serving ten years as a district governor in several places, he was promoted to the undersecretary post at the Ministry of Customs and Monopoly. Zeybek worked then four years long as a coordinator in the private sector.

In 1987, he entered politics and was elected Deputy of Istanbul into the parliament from the Motherland Party. Between 1989 and 1991, he served as the Minister of Culture in the cabinets of Turgut Özal and Yıldırım Akbulut. During his tenure, the festivities of Newroz were allowed in 1991. Later in 1996, Zeybek was appointed again minister in the coalition cabinet of Necmettin Erbakan.

In 2007, Namık Kemal Zeybek joined the Great Union Party, and became its secretary general for a short time. In 2010, he entered the Democratic Party. At the 10th party congress held on January 15, 2011 in Ankara, he was elected leader of its party.

Party political offices
Preceded by Hüsamettin Cindoruk	Democratic Party (DP); January 15, 2011 – 2012	Succeeded by Gültekin Uysal
