= 2007 Turkish general election =

- 22 July 2007

550 seats in the Grand National Assembly 276 seats needed for a majority
- Turnout: 84.25% (▲5.11pp)
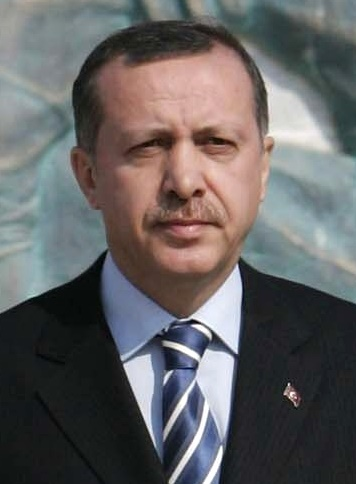

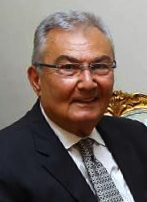

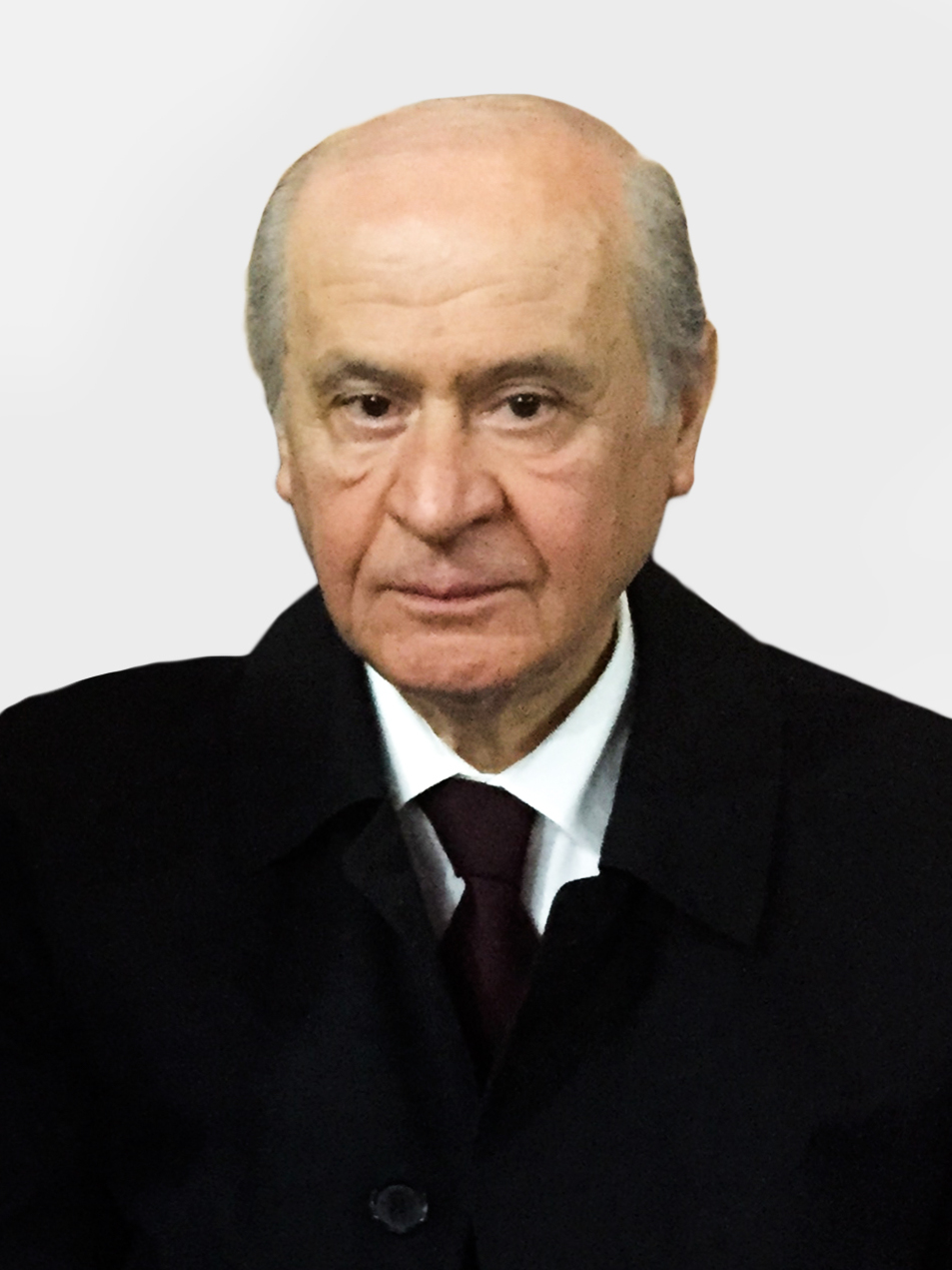
	First party	Second party	Third party
Leader	Recep Tayyip Erdoğan	Deniz Baykal	Devlet Bahçeli
Party	AK Party	CHP	MHP
Last election	34.28%, 363 seats	19.39%, 178 seats	8.36%, 0 seats
Seats won	341	112	71
Seat change	▼22	▼66	▲71
Popular vote	16,327,291	7,317,808	5,001,869
Percentage	46.58%	20.88%	14.27%
Swing	▲12.30pp	▲1.49pp	▲5.91pp
Prime Minister before election
Recep Tayyip Erdoğan
AK Party
Elected Prime Minister
Recep Tayyip Erdoğan
AK Party

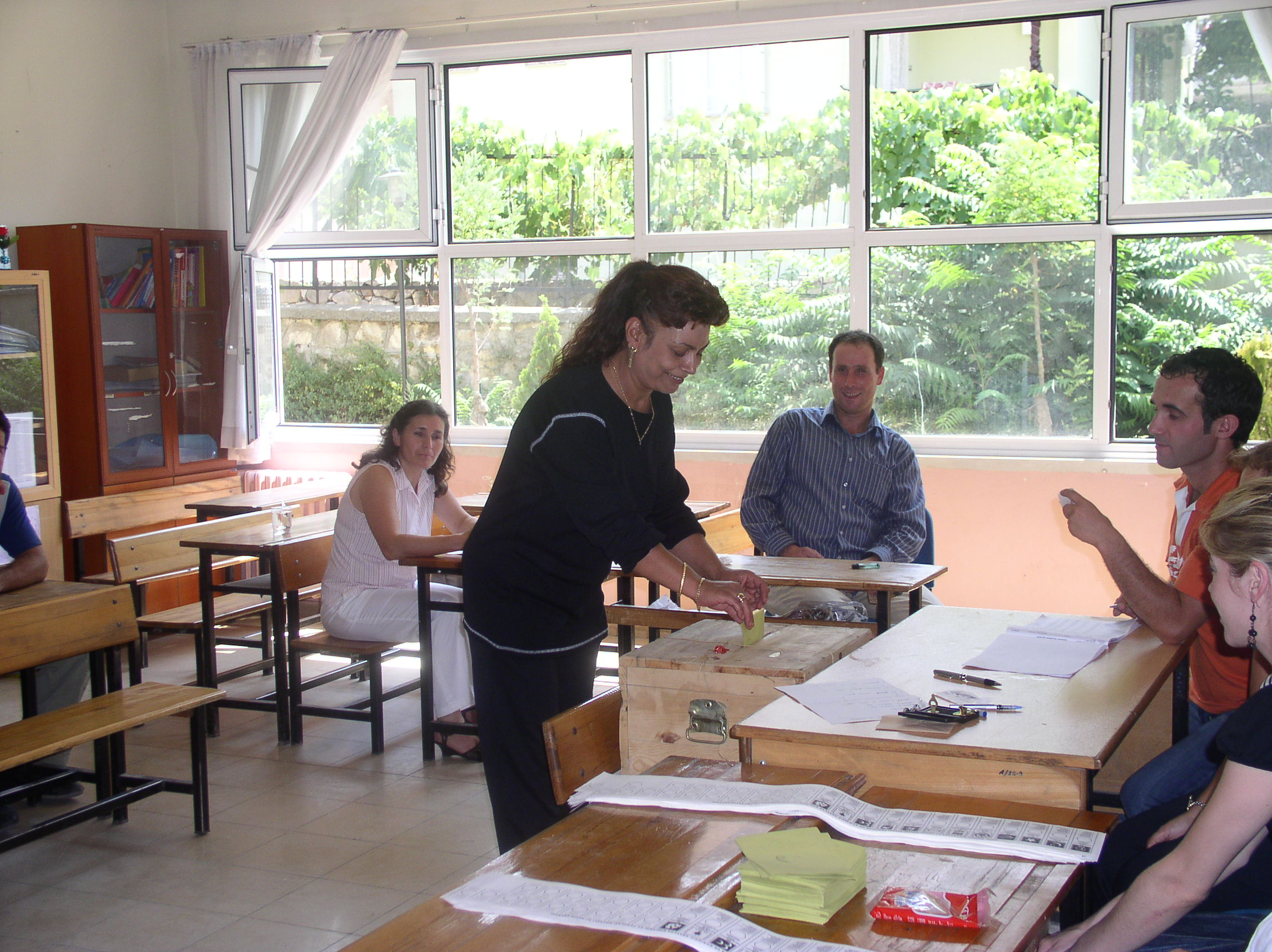
A woman casting her vote

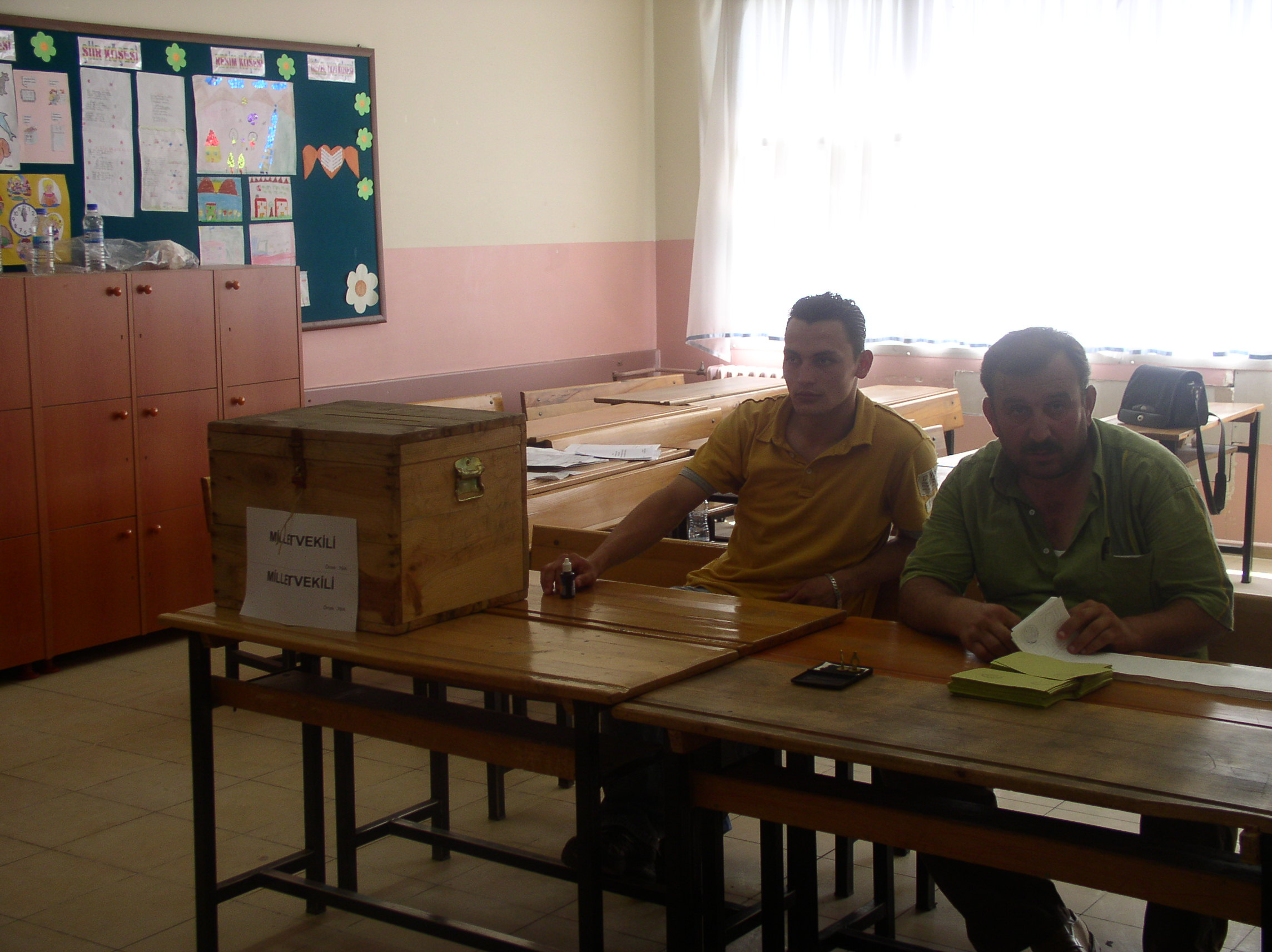
Votes were cast in ballot boxes such as this one

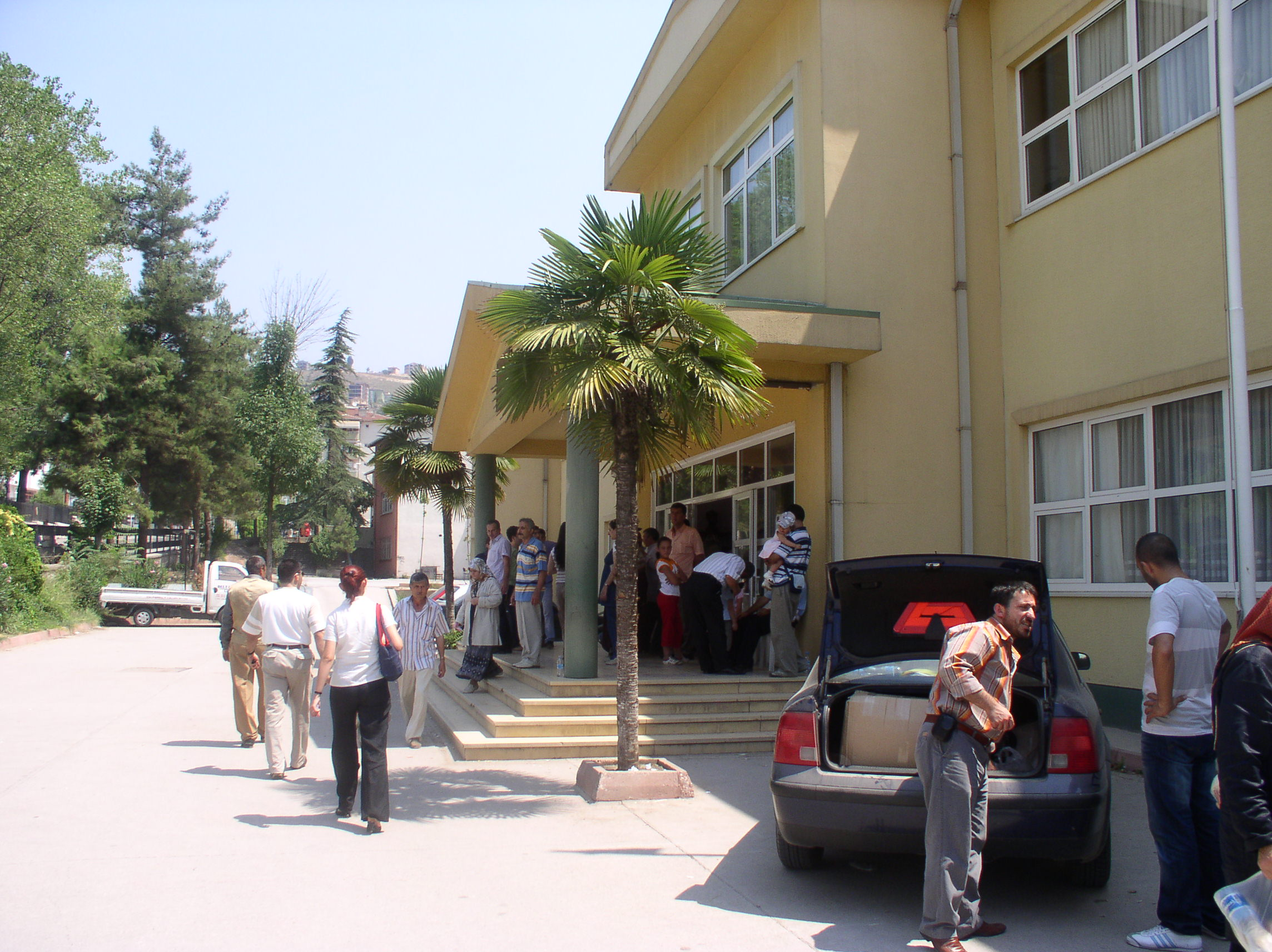
Votes were cast in schools such as this one

General elections were held in Turkey on 22 July 2007 to elect 550 members to the Grand National Assembly. Originally scheduled for November, the elections were brought forward after parliament failed to elect a new president to replace Ahmet Necdet Sezer. The result was a resounding victory for the incumbent Justice and Development Party (AKP), which won 46.6% of the vote and 341 seats. The party's leader Recep Tayyip Erdoğan was consequently re-elected as Prime Minister of Turkey. The opposition Republican People's Party (CHP) came second with 20.9% of the vote and took 112 seats. The Nationalist Movement Party (MHP), which had failed to surpass the 10% election threshold in the 2002 election, re-entered parliament with 14.3% of the vote and 71 MPs. The election was fought mostly on Turkey's debate over laïcité that had been perceived to be under threat from the AKP's nomination of Foreign Minister Abdullah Gül, an Islamist politician, for the Presidency. Developments in Iraq (explained under positions on terrorism and security), secular and religious concerns, the intervention of the military in political issues, European Union membership negotiations, the United States and the Muslim world were other main issues.

In addition to the AKP, CHP and MHP, several Kurdish nationalist and socialist parties formed an electoral alliance named the Thousand Hope Candidates (Bin Umut Adayları) and contested the election as independents in order to bypass the 10% threshold. The alliance, formed of the Democratic Society Party (DTP), Labour Party (EMEP), Freedom and Solidarity Party (ÖDP) and the Socialist Democracy Party (SDP), polled strongly in the south-east where there is a large Kurdish population, receiving 3.81% of the national vote and 22 seats in parliament.

== Background ==
Originally due to be held in November, the elections were called early after the 2007 presidential elections resulted in parliamentary deadlock. The governing Justice and Development Party (AKP) had nominated former Prime Minister and serving Foreign Minister Abdullah Gül as its presidential candidate, amid huge opposition and concern over his former Islamist political background. The controversy was largely caused due to the Turkish Presidency's symbolic role in safeguarding secularism. The opposition Republican People's Party (CHP) subsequently boycotted the parliamentary process of electing a president, denying the government the 67% quorum of MPs necessary for Gül's election to be validated. As required by the constitution, a snap early general election was called for 22 July 2007.

== Conduct ==
Over 42 million people were eligible to vote in the election.

=== Minimum age ===
According to a recent change in election law, the minimum age for candidates for parliament was reduced from 30 to 25. But due to the fact that laws do not take effect for one year after passage, only candidates above the age of 30 were able to be elected in this election.

=== Death threats ===
On 14 May a death threat was issued by the armed Kurdistan Workers Party (PKK) to the Republican People's Party (CHP), Nationalist Movement Party (MHP), True Path Party (DYP) and the Justice and Development Party (AKP) to withdraw their candidates in the cities of Van and Hakkâri allowing Democratic Society Party (DTP) dominance. Turkey, NATO, UN, United States and EU recognizes the Kurdistan Workers Party (PKK) as a terrorist organization.

With the exception of DTP all candidates in Van and Hakkari from CHP, MHP, DYP and AKP must annul[sic] themselves and offer their support to Kurdish people. Our people must demonstrate their kurdishness in the elections. If any different approach develops, our approach will also be different. [...] Whoever continues the activities we mentioned here will be punished. Who ever damages our movement or our party [DTP] will not be forgiven in any way. They should know that they are facing death

=== Parliamentary threshold ===
According to Turkish election laws, a party must gain at least 10% of national vote to be represented in the Grand Assembly. Ostensibly, this law is aimed at preventing a highly fragmented parliament, and yet it is also argued that this is used as a cloak to keep the Kurds from the parliament. Many parties that failed to cross this threshold in the last election will seek a return to Parliament. As the 10% threshold requirement only holds for political parties, to bypass this requirement, the Democratic Society Party decided to have its candidates run as independents. On 13 May DTP announced that if they wanted to, they could lock up the elections by putting in five to ten thousand independent candidates. The next day in a statement, the Supreme Election Committee (Turkish: Yüksek Seçim Kurulu (YSK)) responded to DTP's threat by stating that there is no issue and that they would simply use "larger envelopes".

=== Eligibility for election ===
Muammer Aydin, the President of the Supreme Electoral Council of Turkey, claimed that after the scrutiny of the candidates in terms of their eligibility, the election board decided that Erbakan and former DEP (Democratic Society Party) parliamentarians (Orhan Doğan, Selim Sadak and Hatip Dicle), who was jailed after being found guilty of supporting the PKK, would not be allowed to stand as candidates in the election. In a statement regarding some of the candidates in prison, DTP leader Türk said that hundreds of people support them, even though some are associated with murder cases. The Supreme Court of Appeals wrote a letter to DTP and demanded the cancellation of the candidacy of 74 founding members on the basis that they have criminal backgrounds which automatically disqualifies them from being the elected. DTP leader Türk said, "DTP took the decision to show these people as candidates because [the] Kurdish people see Ankara, the Parliament, as the place for a solution." DTP's move to promote candidates with criminal background was perceived as building a "politics of controversy" in the country as Türk also stated that they had taken the necessary measures to fill the positions of candidates who might be rejected by the Supreme Election Board.

== Issues ==
The stage of the elections were set for a fight for legitimacy in the eyes of voters between Erdoğan's government, which has been criticized as having Islamic leanings, and the country’s secular movement, supported by the Turkish military. Erdoğan, it is said, wants to divert the attention of the voters from local issues to theoretical and ideological ones by making the election a platform for the presidential election.

=== Positions on higher education ===
The capacity of Turkish higher educational institutions falls short compared to the number of high school graduates. The Council of Higher Education is responsible from the planning, implementation and accreditation of higher education in Turkey. The Council of Higher Education limits the number of the available educational institutions based on the available educators (PhD) in the public sector. The second branch, private universities (established by vakifs) are limited by the conditions of accreditation set by the Council of Higher Education.

Erdoğan announced that the problem lies with the Council of Higher Education. Erdoğan proposed that if his party is elected, they will change the constitution to solve this issue. Erdoğan did not give the details or the financial implications of his plan. During the same speech, Erdoğan also proposed to establish a higher educational institution in every province. Critics claim that there is at least one university in every province, and the problem is not construction of buildings but recruiting qualified professors. Erdoğan did not talk about his previous campaign issues, such as the use of the hijab (specially women's head covering) as a religious symbol in higher education which he had previously promoted based on the concept of Islamic jurisprudence.

=== Positions on the presidency ===
The 2007 presidential election was deadlocked in the failed negotiations on the issues surrounding the new president by the parties. The lack of this negotiation forced the Prime Minister Erdoğan and his party to declare early elections to establish a new parliament to tackle the issues of the Presidency.

Erdoğan claims that the position of President is political and it should be elected by the public not by the parties. "How can those who see the election of the Turkish president by popular vote as a problem for the regime ask votes from the people?" asked Erdoğan.

The Republican People’s Party accused Erdoğan of acting with "a sense of vengeance" for having failed first to secure his, then his chosen candidate, Gul's election. Now, at the expense of creating a "degenerated parliamentary system", he is trying to secure a new path to his goal. Baykal said it would mount a legal challenge to this ideology. Baykal claims that the position of president in Turkey is non-partisan, and should be above political concerns and is designed to play an oversight role. The President's job description and powers demand that the policies articulated from this office should reflect a balance within the country, and be an institution which all the parties can trust. Because of this balancing act, according to Baykal, it is very important to create [he says "protect"] the neutral point [through reaching an agreement at the parliament among the parties] as to the President, thus preventing domination of a single party [which might generate PM and President at the same time] and control every mechanism of the Turkish political system.

=== Foreign policy ===
Position of parties regarding Foreign issues.

Issue	CHP	AKP	MHP
EU membership	Support	Support	Oppose
Relations with US	Support	Support	Support
Cyprus	Confederation	Confederation	Two independent states

==== Positions on terrorism and security ====
The PKK is a Kurdish group listed as a terrorist organization by many international organisations, however, after the post-invasion Iraq, 2003–present PKK continued to have training/propaganda camps in northern Iraq and perform attacks using these secure locations into Turkey. The status of these bases have been debated in the Turkish political system for the last two decades. During the 1990s, with the political order, Turkish military destroyed PKK bases in northern-Iraq for the short term reliefs.

Nationalist Movement Party wants the military to destroy PKK camps, and it is willing to give this order to the army anytime as camps reestablish. Erdoğan did not give this order and claimed that he is expecting the request from the military. The military claims the political goal of the military activity should be established by the Erdoğan's ruling party, before any consideration. The Democratic Society Party is against the destruction of these camps, and Ibrahim Aydogdu, the Diyarbakir branch leader of the DTP, claimed on February 18, 2007 "Any attack on Kirkuk [northern Iraq] would be tantamount to an attack on Diyarbakir in Turkey".

== Campaign ==
=== Parties and regions ===
Fourteen parties contested the election:

Parties
Bright Turkey Party (Aydınlık Türkiye Partisi, ATP); Communist Party of Turkey (Türkiye Komünist Partisi, TKP); Democrat Party (Demokrat Parti, DP); Felicity Party (Saadet Partisi, SP); Freedom and Solidarity Party (Özgürlük ve Dayanışma Partisi, ÖDP); Independent Turkey Party (Bağımsız Türkiye Partisi, BTP); Justice and Development Party (Adalet ve Kalkınma Partisi, AKP)	Labour Party (Emek Partisi, EP); Liberal Democratic Party (Liberal Demokrat Parti, LDP); Nationalist Movement Party (Milliyetçi Hareket Partisi, MHP); People's Ascent Party (Halkın Yükselişi Partisi, HYP); Republican People's Party (Cumhuriyet Halk Partisi, CHP); Workers' Party (İşçi Partisi, İP); Young Party (Genç Parti, GP)

Additionally, members of the Democratic Society Party (Demokratik Toplum Partisi, DTP) stood as independents in mainly Kurdish-inhabited districts; over 600 independents contested the election in total.

There are 550 deputies distributed based on the count of electoral vote :

The regions and # of deputies
Adana 14; Adıyaman 5; Afyonkarahisar 7; Ağrı 5; Amasya 3; Ankara 1. Bölge 15; Ankara 2. Bölge 14; Antalya 13; Artvin 2; Aydın 8; Balıkesir 8; Bilecik 2	Bingöl 3; Bitlis 4; Bolu 3; Burdur 3; Bursa 16; Çanakkale 4; Çankırı 3; Çorum 5; Denizli 7; Diyarbakır 10; Edirne 4; Elazığ 5	Erzincan 3; Erzurum 7; Eskişehir 6; Gaziantep 10; Giresun 5; Gümüşhane 2; Hakkâri 3; Hatay 10; Isparta 5; Mersin 12; İstanbul 1. Region 24; İstanbul 2. Region 21	İstanbul 3. Region 25; İzmir 1. Bölge 12; İzmir 2. Bölge 12; Kars 3; Kastamonu 4; Kayseri 8; Kırklareli 3; Kırşehir 3; Kocaeli 9; Konya 16; Kütahya 6; Malatya 7	Manisa 10; Kahramanmaraş 8; Mardin 6; Muğla 6; Muş 4; Nevşehir 3; Niğde 3; Ordu 7; Rize 3; Sakarya 6; Samsun 9; Siirt 3	Sinop 3; Sivas 6; Tekirdağ 5; Tokat 7; Trabzon 8; Tunceli 2; Şanlıurfa 11; Uşak 3; Van 7; Yozgat 6; Zonguldak 5; Aksaray 4	Bayburt 2; Karaman 3; Kırıkkale 4; Batman 4; Şırnak 3; Bartın 2; Ardahan 2; Iğdır 2; Yalova 2; Karabük 3; Kilis 2; Osmaniye 4; Düzce 3

=== Campaign issues ===
The general election will see the governing Justice and Development Party (AKP) hoping to secure its position as the single government party. The Republican People's Party (CHP), a center-left party, will be looking forward to form a single party, or most likely a coalition government.

Prime Minister Recep Tayyip Erdoğan, speaking at a parliamentary group meeting of the Justice and Development Party (AKP) on Friday, stated that they are not engaging in restricted politics but that their party is a center party that is open to all segments of society.

==== Alliances ====
The threshold of 10% forces minor and medium-sized parties to form alliances. The first official offer came from Liberal Democratic Party who offered an alliance to nine political parties both from left and right wings, including the Motherland Party and Democratic Left Party.

Unification:

Liberal parties: On June 2, 2007, the True Path Party changed its name to Democrat Party (DP), and the Motherland Party was to merge into DP. However, the Motherland Party did not dissolve itself in a party congress. On 2 June 2007 Erkan Mumcu made a statement accusing DYP leader not having fulfilled the promises he made in the unification protocol.

Left parties: The Republican People's Party (as the largest centre-left political party) had expressed their wish to amalgamate with the Democratic Left Party and the Social Democratic People's Party. As of May 17, 2007, they made an election alliance with Democratic Left Party.

Groups and unions:

Armenians in Turkey: The Patriarch Mesrob II Mutafyan of Constantinople gave his support to Erdoğan's Justice and Development Party. Mesrob II claimed that Erdoğan has been good to his people, gave his support to Armenians' rights and was less nationalist than the Kemalist CHP. Mesrob II claimed that he represents a substantial number of Armenian votes [around 40,000] and has power to effect the results in his region.

Alevis in Turkey: This elections Alevi representation will not vote as a block to Republican People's Party as they were in the past.

==== Imports/exports ====
Justice and Development Party: Erdoğan, speaking at a parliamentary group meeting of JDP, stated that they are not engaging in restricted politics [only based on religion] but that their party is a "center party" that is open to all segments of society.

Imports: In alliance with his goal: Ankara Chamber of Industry Chairman Zafer Çağlayan, Ahmet İyimaya (from DYP), Mehmet Domaç, Associate Professor Zeynep Dağı, Professor Zafer Üskül (from SHP), Fazilet Dağcı Çığlı, Professor Yusuf Ziya İrbeç, Osman Yağmurdereli, Ertuğrul Günay (from CHP), Reha Çamuroğlu (Alevi) and Ülkü Gökalp Güney are imported to the party.

Exports: Before the party lists declared; the establishing member and the State Minister Abdüllatif Şener said he would not run for parliamentary elections. Bandırma deputy Turhan Çömez, declared that he will not run.

Motherland Party: After the failed unification (alliance) there are members that quit the party.

Exports: Nejat Arseven, Lütfullah Kayalar (to CHP), Edip Safder Gaydalı (to CHP) and Şerif Bedirhanoğlu among them.

==== Finance ====
Campaign finance has been an issue in Turkey, as religion-based parties were said to have taken foreign monetary support. The parties have respectively raised through membership charges:

- Justice and Development Party, 8,000,000 YTL
- Republican People's Party, 7,000,000 YTL
- True Path Party, 4,500,000 YTL
- Motherland Party, 4,000,000 YTL
- Nationalist Movement Party, 1,300,000 YTL

The "total expenses" for each party at the end of the election was; Justice and Development Party 141.216.258 YTL, Republican People's Party, 79.874.759 YTL, Nationalist Movement Party 26.547.814 YTL, Genç Parti 23.020.688 YTL, True Path Party 30.306.255 YTL. Some of the raised money was claimed to be used as a financial bargain as Justice and Development Party handed out presents in party meetings.

=== Debates ===
There were no face to face debates that brought leaders into a single medium during this campaign period. The limited argumentation between leaders were performed throughout the rallies and use of media as a communication tool.

== Opinion polls ==
Unified	Party	Leader	July 2006 TNS Piar^{1}		Nov 2006 SONAR²		Feb 2007 SONAR³		May 2007 SONAR³		May 2007 A&G²		June 2007 VERSO^{4}	
Unified	Party	Leader	Votes (%)	+/−	Votes (%)	+/−	Votes (%)	+/−	Votes (%)	+/−	Votes (%)	+/−	Votes (%)	+/−
	Justice and Development Party	Erdoğan	38.6	+4.32	27.61	-6.67	31.58		29.04		41.3	+7.02	38.1	-3.2
CHP	Republican People's Party	Baykal	11.9	-7.5	18.32	-1.08	14.76		14.08		13.6	-5.8	20.3	+6.6
CHP	Democratic Left Party	Sezer	2	+0.78	8.14	+6.92	6.7		8.3		1.2			
	True Path Party	Ağar	7.3	-2.25	13.26	+3.71	13.06		12.07		10.7	+1.15		
	Nationalist Movement Party	Bahçeli	5.8	-2.54	13.04	+4.7	13.67		12.18		6.9	-1.44	14.1	+7.2
	Democratic Society Party		5.7	-0.53	4.24	-1.99	4.37		2.6		3.6		3.1	-0.5
	Motherland Party	Mumcu	3.7	-1.43	5.01	-0.12	4.1		8.03					
	Young Party	Uzan	3.5	-3.75	5.23	-2.02	6.9		10.07		3.9		3.7	-0.2
	Social Democratic People's Party			2.09	2.09	1.37								
	Felicity Party		1.6	-0.88										
	Great Union Party		0.6	-0.34			1.5		2.43					
	Freedom and Solidarity Party		0.3	-0.04										
	Others			3.06		1.98								

^{1} Results do not include a 33.9% block of people polled who said they were undecided. Source: Sabah

² Source: SONAR Araştırma

³ Results are after distribution of undecided votes. Source: SONAR Araştırma

^{4} VERSO Center of Political Studies Source: Angus Reid Global Monitor

== Results ==
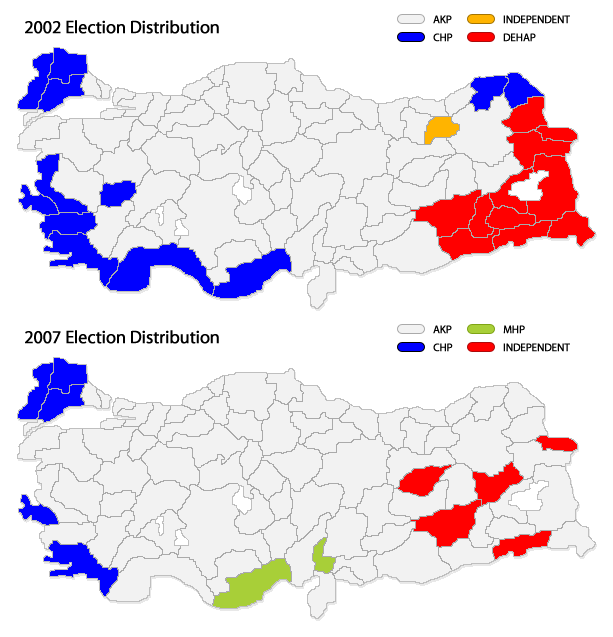
Winning party by province 2002 and 2007

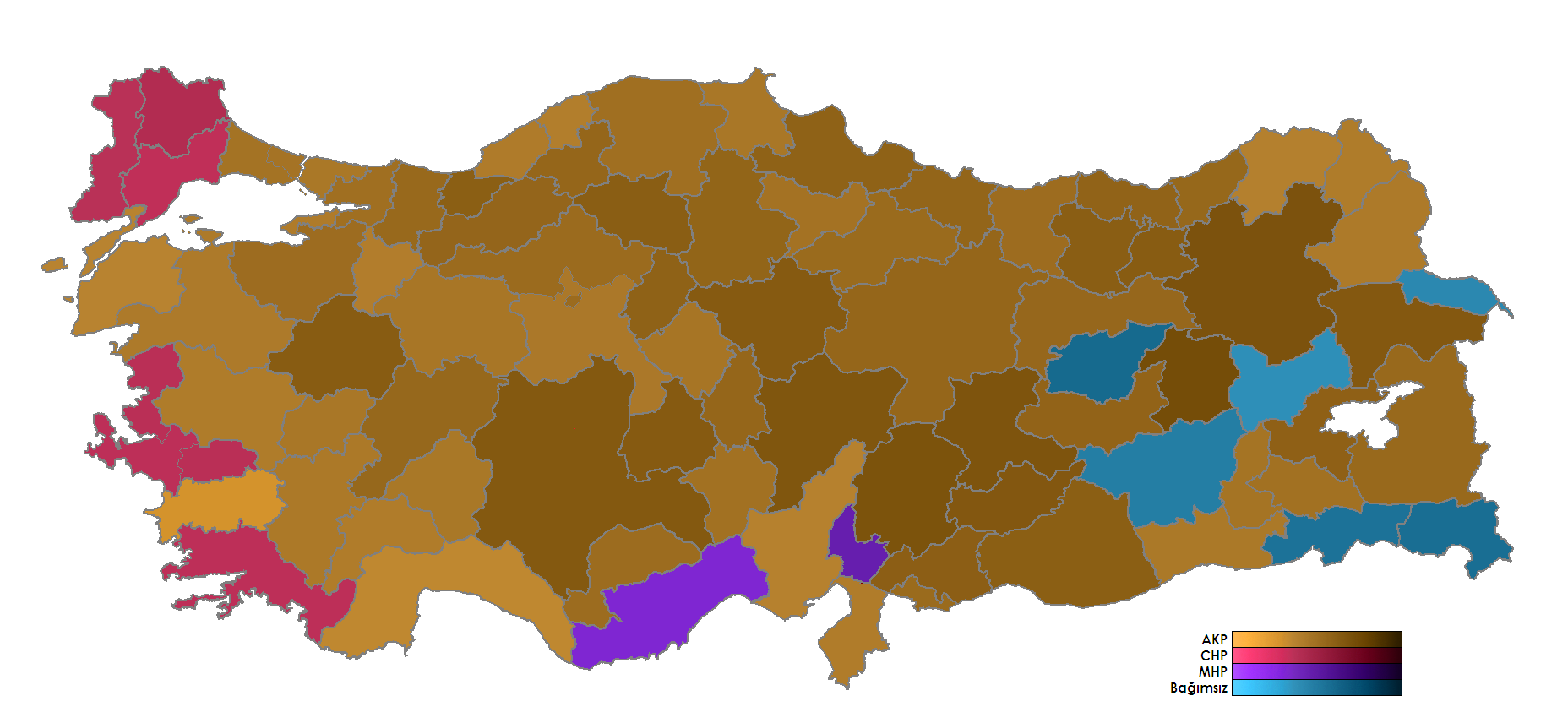
Winning party by province 2007 toned light (narrow win) to dark (large majority)

Party	Votes	%	Seats	+/–
Justice and Development Party	16,327,291	46.58	341	–22
Republican People's Party	7,317,808	20.88	112	–66
Nationalist Movement Party	5,001,869	14.27	71	+71
Democrat Party	1,898,873	5.42	0	0
Young Party	1,064,871	3.04	0	0
Felicity Party	820,289	2.34	0	0
Independent Turkey Party	182,095	0.52	0	0
People's Ascent Party	179,010	0.51	0	New
Workers' Party	128,148	0.37	0	0
Bright Turkey Party	100,982	0.29	0	New
Communist Party of Turkey	79,258	0.23	0	0
Freedom and Solidarity Party	52,055	0.15	0	0
Liberal Democrat Party	35,364	0.10	0	0
Labour Party	26,292	0.08	0	New
Independents	1,835,486	5.24	26	+17
Total	35,049,691	100.00	550	0
Valid votes	35,049,691	97.21		
Invalid/blank votes	1,006,602	2.79		
Total votes	36,056,293	100.00		
Registered voters/turnout	42,799,303	84.25		
Source: YSK

=== Composition of the Grand National Assembly ===
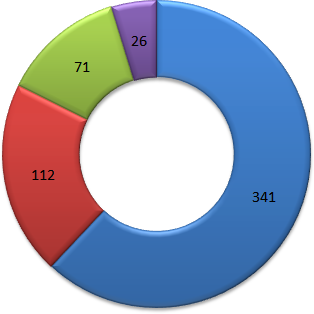
MP distribution:

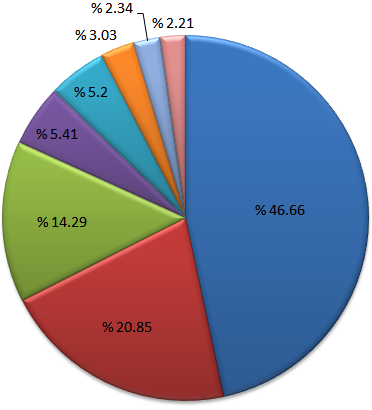
Vote Distribution:

Elected as	Party	Seats
Justice and Development Party		341
Republican People's Party	Republican People's Party	99
Republican People's Party	Democratic Left Party	13
Nationalist Movement Party		71
Independents	Democratic Society Party	20
Independents	Great Union Party	1
Independents	Freedom and Solidarity Party	1
Independents	Independents	3
Total		550

One of the parliamentarians elected for MHP in Istanbul 3, Mehmet Cihat Özönder, died in a traffic accident on 26 July 2007. Furthermore, the election of independent DTP member Sebahat Tuncel was criticised by opponents; she was elected from prison, having been arrested in November 2006 for alleged links to the PKK.

== Analysis ==
While the AKP gained votes over 2002, the resurgence of the nationalist MHP resulted in a slight net loss of 23 seats for AKP. AKP was therefore unable to obtain a two-thirds majority for the second time since the party first contested a general election in 2002. Still, with 61.8% of the seats, the AKP maintains a large outright majority in the 16th Parliament. The resurgence of the MHP gives them 71 seats to make them the third party for the 16th Parliament. Their resurgence proved far more costly for the CHP, who lost 66 seats but maintained their position as the second party in the 16th Parliament.

Independents fared far better in 2007 than in 2002, earning a 5.2% share of the popular vote, up from 1% in the previous election. As a result, the number of independent MPs in the 16th Parliament (60th government) will increase from 9 to 27.

== See also ==
- Politics of Turkey
- History of the Republic of Turkey#AKP government (2002–present)
