= 12th Nationalist Movement Party Ordinary Congress =

Nationalist Movement Party Ordinary Congress, 2018
- 18 March 2018
- Turnout: 96.9%
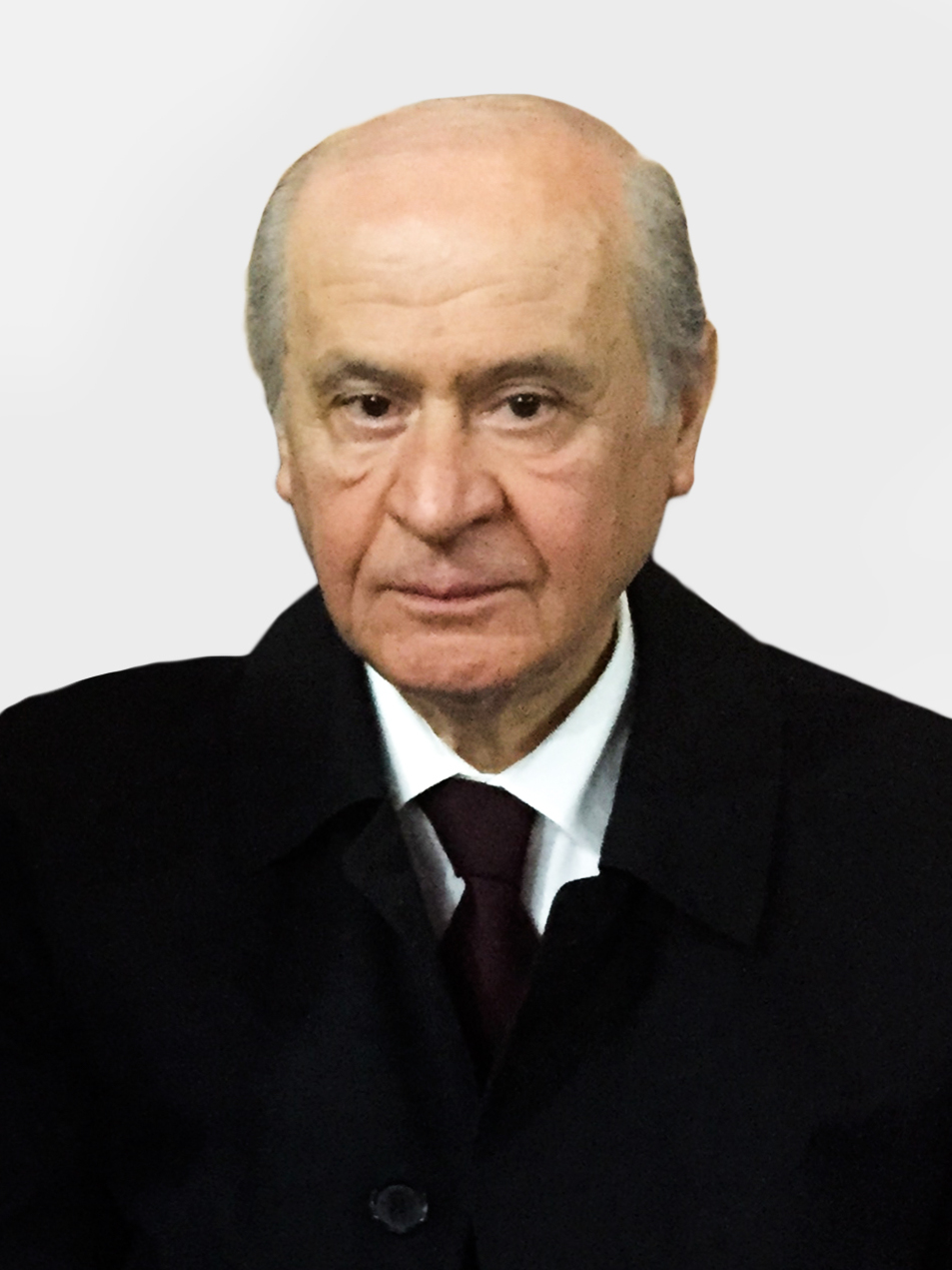
Candidate	Devlet Bahçeli
Party	MHP
Constituency	Osmaniye
Popular vote	1,167
Percentage	100%
Leader before election
Devlet Bahçeli
MHP
Elected Leader
Devlet Bahçeli
MHP

The 12th Nationalist Movement Party Ordinary Congress (Turkish: 12. Milliyetçi Hareket Partisi Olağan Kongresi) was a political party convention held by the Turkish right-wing Nationalist Movement Party (MHP) on 18 March 2018. The Congress resulted in the re-election of Devlet Bahçeli as party leader, having been the only candidate.

== Background ==
=== Inner-party split ===
Following the November 2015 general election, MHP leader Devlet Bahçeli had faced several calls for his resignation after his poor election results. The dissidents, consisting predominantly of Meral Akşener Ümit Özdağ, Yusuf Halaçoğlu and Koray Aydın, began collecting delegate signatures to change the MHP constitution and allow for leadership challenges. A constitutional congress was held by the dissidents on 19 June 2016, with the changes being approved by delegates, although the congress was not recognised by the MHP executive and was eventually annulled by the courts. The dissidents were later suspended from the MHP by the party disciplinary committee. The MHP lost further support following Bahçeli's declaration of support for a 'yes' vote in the 2017 constitutional referendum, with the dissidents openly campaigning for a 'No' vote and arguably carrying most of the Turkish nationalist vote with them.

=== People's Alliance with the AKP ===
With the dissidents forming a new, centrist party (namely the Good Party) under the leadership of Akşener, the MHP announced that it would support the re-election of Recep Tayyip Erdoğan in forthcoming presidential elections and seek to form an electoral alliance with Erdoğan's Justice and Development Party (AKP). The People's Alliance between the two parties was later launched in February 2018. On 18 April, Erdoğan called early parliamentary and presidential elections for 24 June 2018 after a call from Bahçeli to have them brought forward from their original date of 3 November 2019.

== Leadership election ==
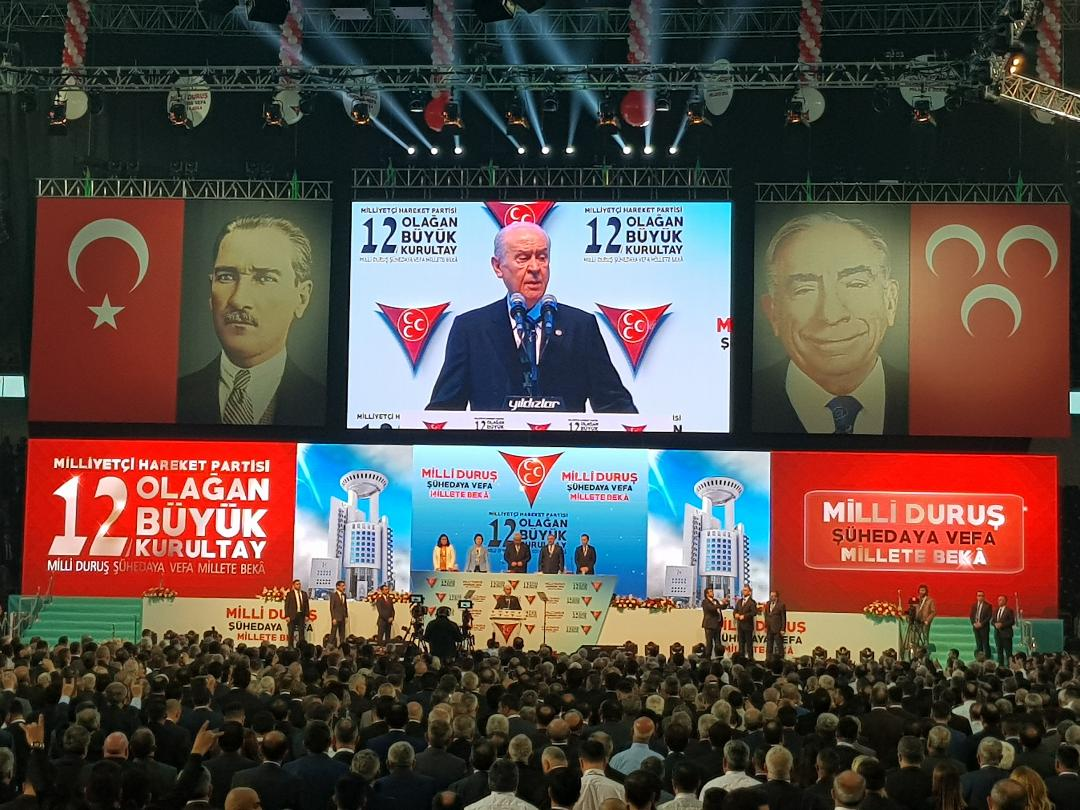
Party leader and only leadership candidate Devlet Bahçeli speaking at the party's 12th ordinary congress

=== Candidates ===
- Devlet Bahçeli, Member of Parliament for Osmaniye and leader of the MHP since 1997

Only Bahçeli put his name forward for the leadership, receiving 1,176 signatures from 1,207 delegates.

=== Results ===
Candidate	Votes	%
Devlet Bahçeli	1,167	100.0
Invalid/blank votes	2	–
Total	1,169	100.0
Number of delegates/turnout	1,207	96.9
Source: NTV

== See also ==
- 36th Republican People's Party Ordinary Convention
- 3rd Peoples' Democratic Party Ordinary Congress
