= 2018 Turkish parliamentary election =

- 24 June 2018

All 600 seats in the Grand National Assembly 301 seats needed for a majority
- Opinion polls
- Turnout: 86.22% (▲0.99pp)
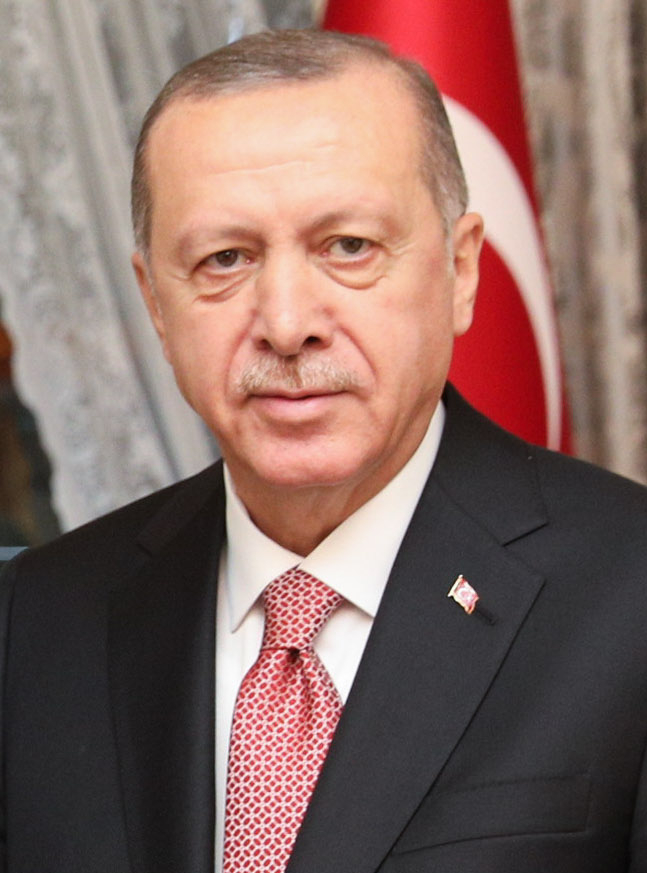

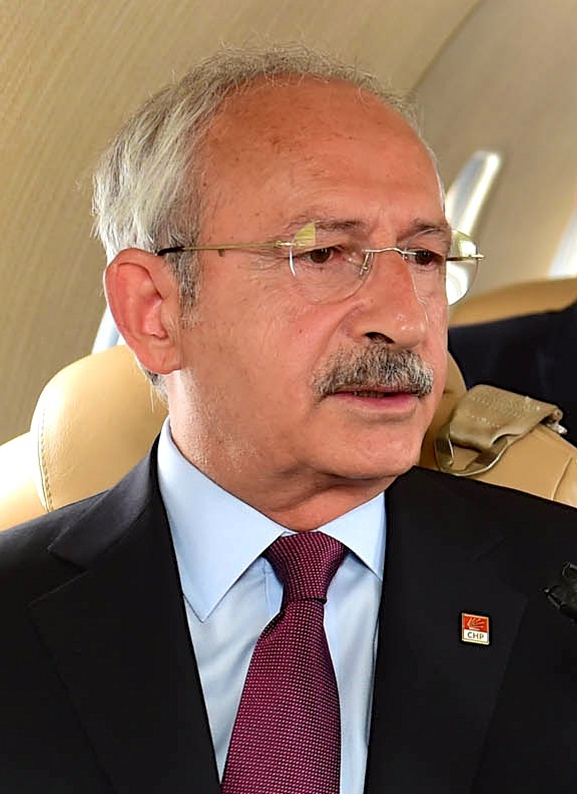

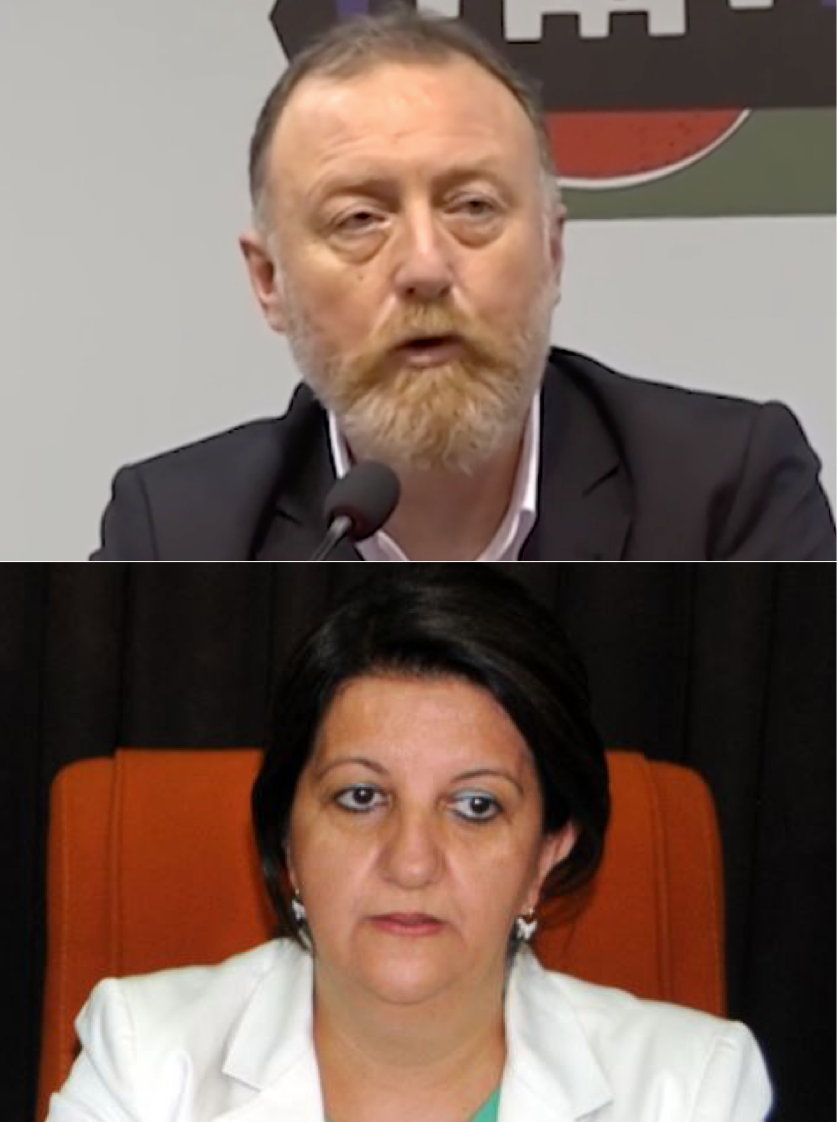

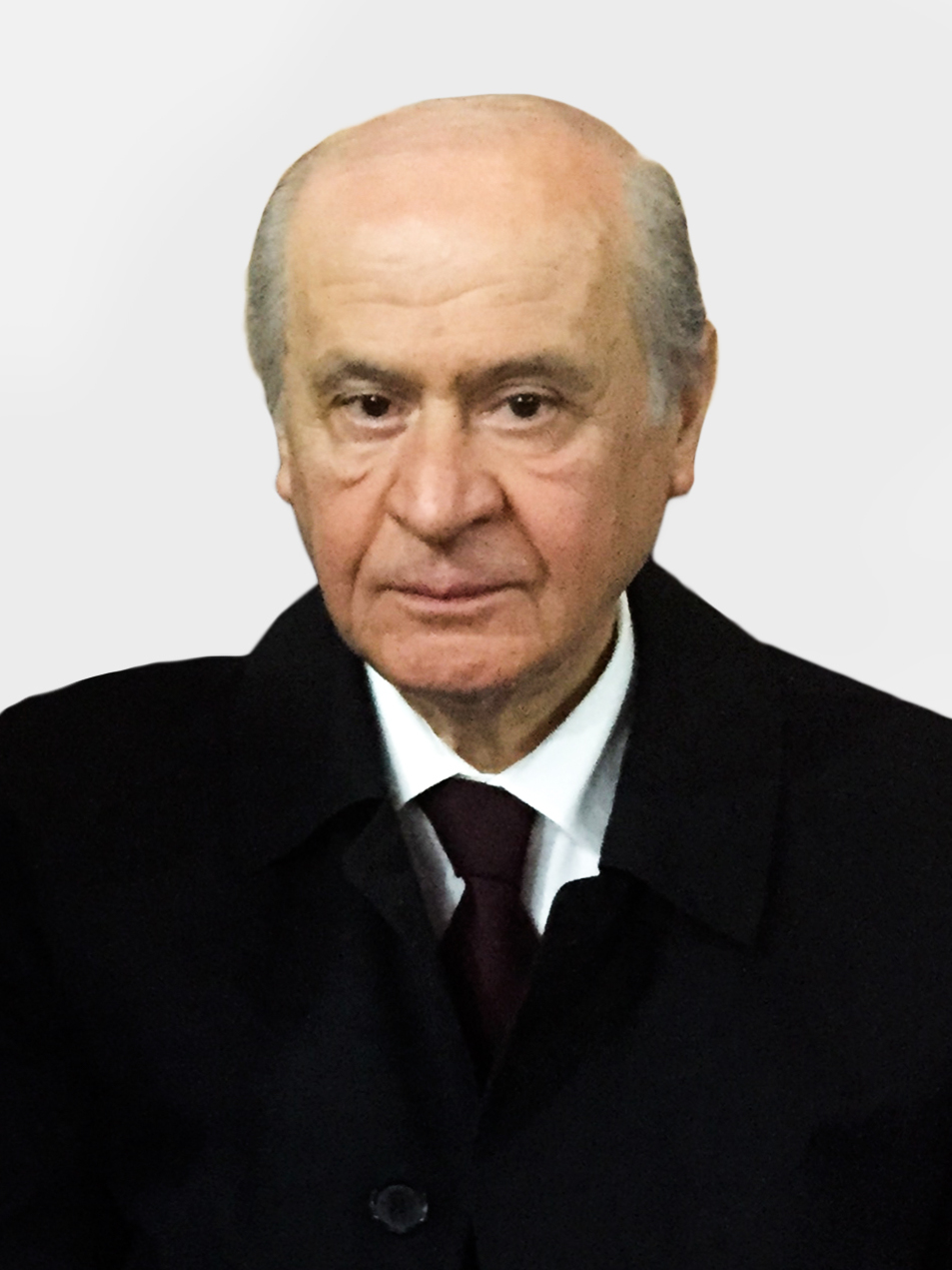

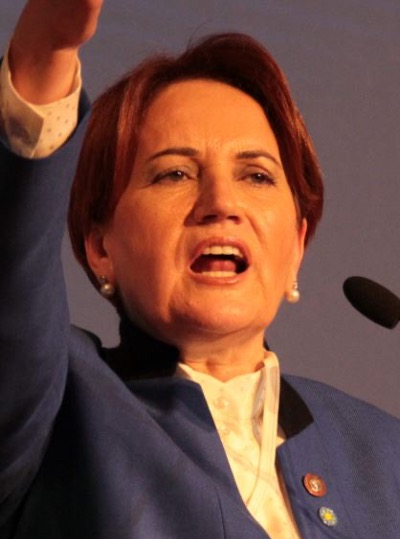
	First party	Second party	Third party
Leader	Recep Tayyip Erdoğan	Kemal Kılıçdaroğlu	Sezai Temelli; Pervin Buldan
Party	AK Party	CHP	HDP
Alliance	People	Nation	None (Note: Supported by the left-wing political parties and groups of the HDK)
Last election	49.50%, 317 seats	25.32%, 134 seats	10.76%, 59 seats
Seats won	295	146	67
Seat change	▼22	▲12	▲8
Popular vote	21,338,693	11,354,190	5,867,302
Percentage	42.56%	22.65%	11.70%
Swing	▼6.94pp	▼2.67pp	▲0.94pp
	Fourth party	Fifth party
Leader	Devlet Bahçeli	Meral Akşener
Party	MHP	İYİ
Alliance	People	Nation
Last election	11.90%, 40 seats	–
Seats won	49	43
Seat change	▲9	New
Popular vote	5,565,331	4,993,479
Percentage	11.10%	9.96%
Swing	▼0.80pp	New
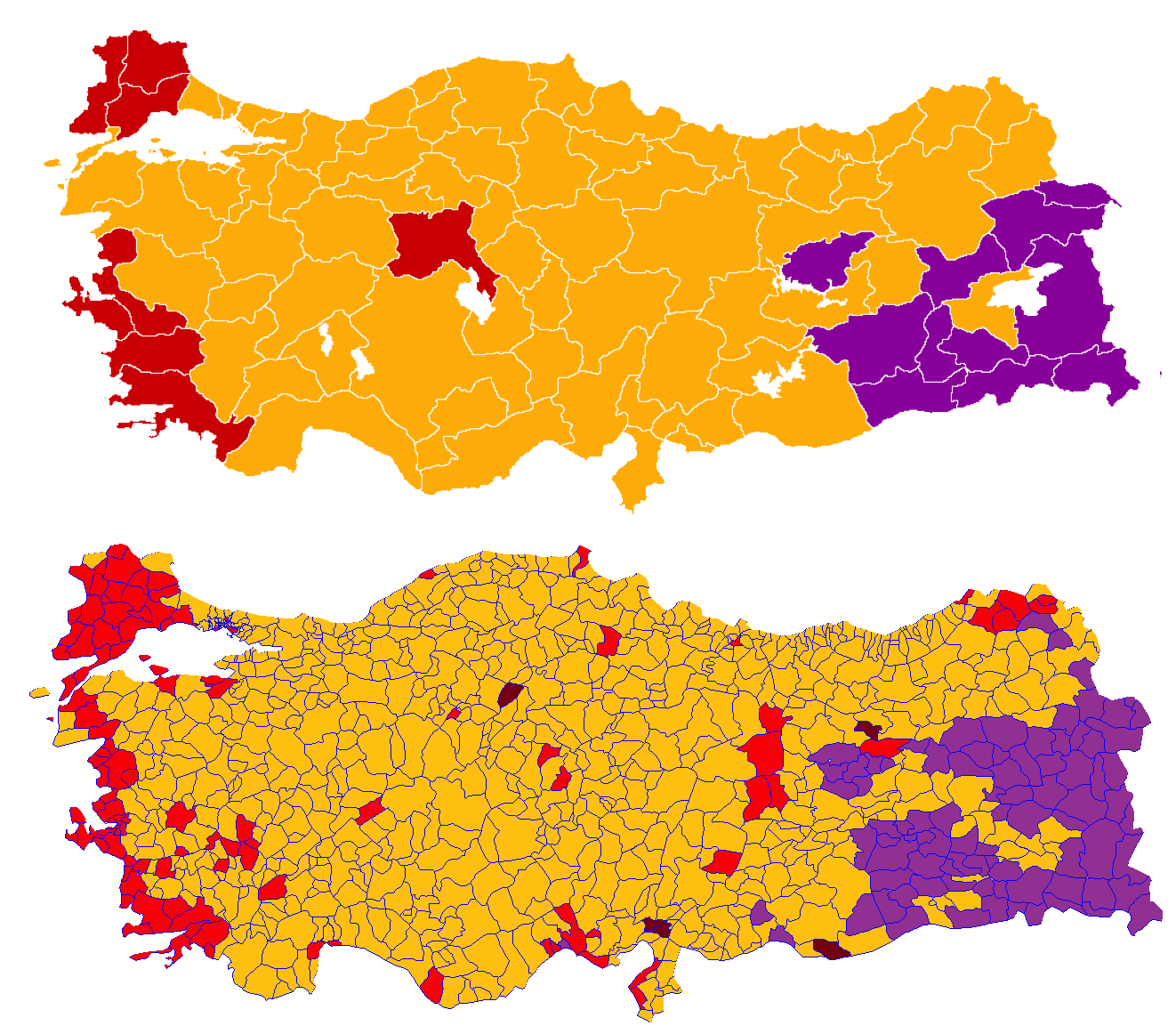
Prime Minister (office abolished after election) before election
Binali Yıldırım
AK Party
Elected Speaker of the Assembly
Binali Yıldırım
AK Party

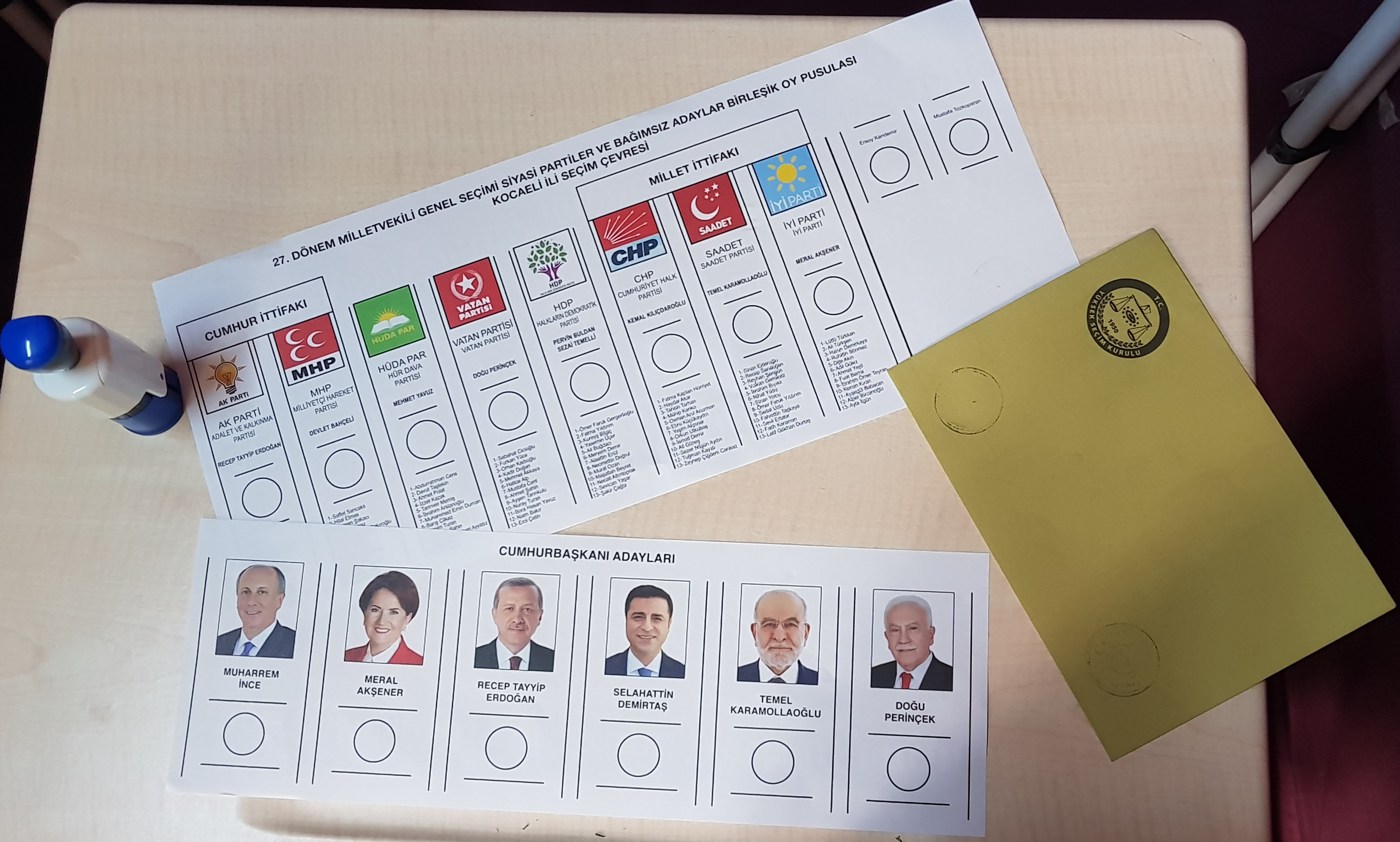
2018 Ballot paper in Kocaeli

Parliamentary elections were held in Turkey on 24 June 2018 as part of general elections, with presidential elections taking place on the same day. Originally scheduled for 27 October 2019, President Recep Tayyip Erdoğan called snap elections on 18 April after months of speculation. With the passage of a series of constitutional amendments in the 2017 referendum, the number of MPs will be increased from the previous 550 to 600. These representatives will be elected by the constituents of the 87 electoral districts of Turkey by party-list proportional representation.

The referendum in 2017 triggered a transition from a parliamentary system to an executive presidency. As such, the Grand National Assembly elected in 2018 was not entitled to appoint the prime minister and cabinet after the elections. While the office of prime minister was set to be abolished altogether, cabinet ministers will primarily serve at the pleasure of the president, who is to fill the role of both head of state and head of government.

== Background ==
=== Elections of 2015 ===
After the elections of June 2015 resulted in the ruling Justice and Development Party (AKP) losing its majority, the four parties in the Grand National Assembly were faced with the prospect of a coalition government. However, after government formation talks broke down, early elections were called for November 2015. The snap election saw the AKP regain its absolute parliamentary majority with 317 of 550 seats. The remainder went to the Republican People's Party (CHP) on 134 seats, the Peoples' Democratic Party (HDP) on 59, and the Nationalist Movement Party (MHP) on 40. The results of the November 2015 elections allowed the AKP to form a single-party government under its leader Ahmet Davutoğlu, but not to change the constitution or call a referendum, which would have required two-thirds or three-fifths majorities, respectively. As such, President Recep Tayyip Erdoğan was left nominally unable to trigger a switch from a parliamentary to a presidential system, as his AKP had campaigned for ahead of the elections. Additionally, he faced opposition on the matter from Prime Minister Davutoğlu, who allegedly held reservations over a change in form of government. In May 2016, Davutoğlu resigned from both the AKP leadership and the premiership, citing disagreements with Erdoğan as part of the reason. He was replaced in both capacities by Binali Yıldırım.

=== Coup attempt and state of emergency ===
On 15 July 2016, sections of the Turkish Armed Forces (TSK) launched a coup d'état against the Turkish government, including the ruling AKP government of Prime Minister Binali Yıldırım and President Recep Tayyip Erdoğan. Military jets were reportedly spotted flying over Ankara just before 23:00 EEST (UTC+3), while both the Fatih Sultan Mehmet and Bosphorus bridges in Istanbul were closed by the armed forces. In a televised address on the TRT station, the coup plotters, who referred to themselves as the Peace at Home Council (Turkish: Yurtta Sulh Konseyi), claimed that "The government ... [had] been dismissed from office". However, the coup attempt ultimately failed, after President Erdoğan addressed the Turkish people through the FaceTime mobile application, urging them to resist the coup plotters. By the morning of 16 July 2016, the situation had reportedly been brought under control, while the Turkish government accused the Gülen movement of having orchestrated the putsch, and vowed to purge state institutions of its members. On 15 July 2016, Erdoğan announced the introduction of a three-month state of emergency. Under Turkish law, states of emergency may only be upheld for three months at a time, though they may be renewed an unlimited number of times by parliamentary vote. The post-coup state of emergency in Turkey has been extended seven times, and were officially lifted on 19 July, although observers criticized the administration as "nothing much changed", with one in particular noting "Although the lifting of the state of emergency is symbolically positive, in that the clampdown we saw after the coup has come to an end... I'm not sure this is going to make a very big difference". The elections of June 2018 are likely to take place under the ongoing state of emergency.

== Electoral system ==
The 600 members of the Grand National Assembly of Turkey will be elected by party-list proportional representation in 87 electoral districts, by the D'Hondt method. For the purpose of legislative elections, 77 of Turkey's 81 provinces serves as a single district. Due to their large populations, the provinces of Bursa and İzmir are divided into two districts, while the provinces of Ankara and Istanbul are each divided into three.

Since the introduction of Turkey's Constitution of 1982, political parties are required to pass an electoral threshold of 10% of the nationwide popular vote in order to obtain seats in parliament, with all those falling below the threshold disregarded for seat distribution purposes. Furthermore, parties must be officially organised in at least half of provinces (41 or more) and in at least a third of districts in those provinces, and must nominate two candidates in 41 or more provinces, in order to be entitled to seats.

=== Electoral alliances law ===
In early 2018, the governing Justice and Development Party (AKP) and the far-right opposition Nationalist Movement Party (MHP) brought forward joint proposals for an electoral alliance law. This was widely speculated to be a result of the MHP's low poll ratings, which made it seemingly impossible to surpass the 10% threshold and win seats in future elections. The MHP had previously announced that it would support the re-election of AKP leader Recep Tayyip Erdoğan to the Presidency, and claimed it was open to contesting future parliamentary elections in an alliance with the AKP.

The new electoral alliances law allowed parties to form alliances and submit them to the YSK, meaning that they would be grouped together under their alliance name on the ballot paper. In addition, voters would be given the option to vote for the alliance as a whole if they did not prefer a specific party. Votes cast for alliances rather than parties would then be distributed to each member party of the alliance at electoral district-level depending on their vote shares. For example, if Party A and Party B were in an alliance and received 60 and 40 votes in an electoral district respectively, then 60% of votes cast for the alliance as a whole would be given to Party A while 40% would be given to Party B. Thus, if 10 votes were cast for the alliance, Party A would have a total of 66 (60+6) votes and Party B would have 44 (40+4) votes.

Parties contesting the election within an alliance would not be subject to the 10% threshold. As long as the Alliance in total won above 10% of the national vote, any party within it would be eligible to win seats regardless of how low their vote share.

The election alliance law also contained numerous controversial changes to election law, including the legalisation of unverified ballot papers to be incorporated in the count. The issue of counting unverified ballots caused a huge controversy during the 2017 constitutional referendum, causing the opposition to allege large-scale electoral fraud and reject the results. On 31 May, the Constitutional Court of Turkey rejected the opposition's bid to nullify the controversial changes.

=== Electoral districts ===
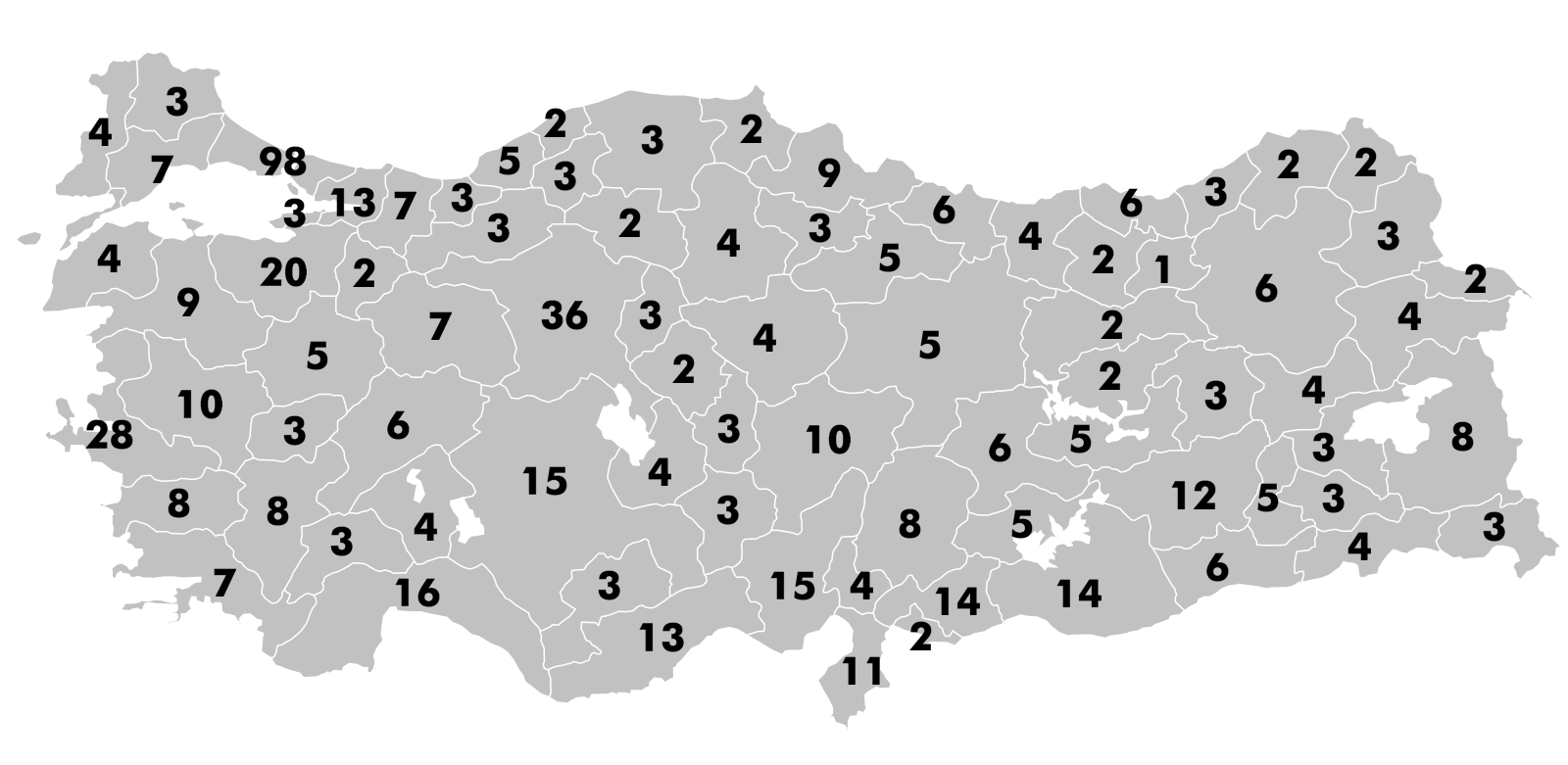
Number of seats in parliament per province as of 2018

District	MPs
Adana	15
Adıyaman	5
Afyonkarahisar	6
Ağrı	4
Aksaray	4
Amasya	3
Ankara	36
Ankara (I)	13
Ankara (II)	11
Ankara (III)	12
Antalya	16
Ardahan	2
Artvin	2
Aydın	8
Balıkesir	9
Bartın	2
Batman	5
Bayburt	1
Bilecik	2
Bingöl	3
Bitlis	3
Bolu	3

District	MPs
Burdur	3
Bursa	20
Bursa (I)	10
Bursa (II)	10
Çanakkale	4
Çankırı	2
Çorum	4
Denizli	8
Diyarbakır	12
Düzce	3
Edirne	4
Elazığ	5
Erzincan	2
Erzurum	6
Eskişehir	7
Gaziantep	14
Giresun	4
Gümüşhane	2
Hakkâri	3
Hatay	11
Iğdır	2
Isparta	4

District	MPs
Istanbul	98
Istanbul (I)	35
Istanbul (II)	28
Istanbul (III)	35
İzmir	28
İzmir (I)	14
İzmir (II)	14
Kahramanmaraş	8
Kars	3
Kastamonu	3
Karabük	3
Karaman	3
Kayseri	10
Kilis	2
Kırklareli	3
Kırıkkale	3
Kırşehir	2
Kocaeli	13
Konya	15
Kütahya	5
Malatya	6
Manisa	10

District	MPs
Mardin	6
Mersin	13
Muğla	7
Muş	4
Nevşehir	3
Niğde	3
Ordu	6
Osmaniye	4
Rize	3
Sakarya	7
Samsun	9
Siirt	3
Sinop	2

District	MPs
Sivas	5
Şanlıurfa	14
Şırnak	4
Tekirdağ	7
Tokat	5
Trabzon	6
Tunceli	2
Uşak	3
Van	8
Yalova	3
Yozgat	4
Zonguldak	5
Total	600

==== Changes since 2015 ====
Following the 2017 constitutional referendum, the number of parliamentary seats was increased from 550 to 600. As a result, most electoral districts saw an increase in their number of seats in comparison to distribution at the November 2015 general election. The following tables show the changes, as announced by the Supreme Electoral Council of Turkey (YSK).

The seat distribution revisions meant that there was one single-member constituency, namely that of Bayburt. This essentially meant that the election in Bayburt, the only province-wide electoral district to lose seats following the re-distribution, will be conducted by first-past-the-post.

District	±
Adana	▲1
Afyonkarahisar	▲1
Aksaray	▲1
Ankara	▲4
Ankara (I)	▼5
Ankara (II)	▼3
Ankara (III)	New
Antalya	▲2
Aydın	▲1
Balıkesir	▲1
Batman	▲1

District	±
Bayburt	▼1
Bursa	▲2
Bursa (I)	New
Bursa (II)	New
Denizli	▲1
Diyarbakır	▲1
Edirne	▲1
Elazığ	▲1
Eskişehir	▲1
Gaziantep	▲2
Hatay	▲1

District	±
Istanbul	▲10
Istanbul (I)	▲4
Istanbul (II)	▲2
Istanbul (III)	▲4
İzmir	▲2
İzmir (I)	▲1
İzmir (II)	▲1
Karabük	▲1
Karaman	▲1
Kayseri	▲1
Kocaeli	▲2

District	±
Konya	▲1
Kütahya	▲1
Manisa	▲1
Mersin	▲2
Muğla	▲1
Muş	▲1
Ordu	▲1
Şanlıurfa	▲2
Tekirdağ	▲1
Yalova	▲1

== Alliances ==
Following the approval of an election alliance law in early 2018, parties were given the ability to contest the election under formal alliances as a means of jointly surpassing the election threshold. A total of 5 parties decided to form two alliances by the 6 May deadline, with a further two parties contesting the election under the lists of these parties.

=== People's Alliance ===
People's Alliance

Last election:
61.93%
29,629,266 votes

351 / 550

On 20 February 2018, President Recep Tayyip Erdoğan formally announced the establishment of the People's Alliance (Turkish: Cumhur İttifakı) between his Justice and Development Party (AK Party) and the Nationalist Movement Party (MHP). The MHP had previously announced that it would support Erdoğan's re-election and was open to contest future elections under the AK Party banner, which was largely seen as the main reason for the electoral alliances law to be passed in the first place. On 3 May, the Great Unity Party (BBP) joined the People's Alliance and announced that it would contest the elections under the AK Party banner.

The People's Alliance is both a parliamentary and a presidential alliance, although one of its supporters, namely the Free Cause Party (HÜDA-PAR) only supports the Alliance in the presidential election while contesting the parliamentary election as a stand-alone party.

=== Nation Alliance ===
Nation Alliance

Last election:
26.14%
12,507,109 votes

137 / 550

The Nation Alliance is an opposition alliance launched on 1 May 2018 in rival to the People's Alliance. The alliance is formed of the main opposition Republican People's Party (CHP), the newly formed nationalist İyi Party, the Islamist Felicity Party and the centre-right Democrat Party. The formation of the alliance was criticised by the People's Alliance for being an alliance of 'non-conformists', citing the secular ideology of the CHP in rival to the Islamist-orientated Felicity Party. However, the Alliance crucially removed the 10% threshold condition for the Felicity Party, which had at the previous election won 0.68% of the vote. This meant that many Islamist leaning voters, which had previously voted for the AKP in order to not waste their vote, could now vote for the Felicity Party due to its presence in an alliance that is polling above 10% altogether. The four parties were unable to agree on a joint presidential candidate despite speculation over the joint nomination of former president Abdullah Gül. Thus, each party ended up nominating their own candidate for the presidential election.

The inclusion of the pro-Kurdish Peoples' Democratic Party (HDP) was a widely discussed possibility, with the HDP openly calling for its inclusion. Since the HDP is polling very close to the 10% threshold, its ultimate exclusion was criticised by many. The main reason for the HDP's exclusion was seen to be their unclear association with the Kurdistan Workers' Party (PKK) terrorist organisation.

=== Other speculated alliances ===
Following the HDP's exclusion from the Nation Alliance, it was speculated that the HDP and the Free Cause Party (HÜDA-PAR), an Islamist orientated far-right Kurdish party, could form a broad 'Kurdish alliance'. The alliance was ultimately rejected by the HDP, citing that their left-leaning voter base was not ready for an alliance with a far-right party.

It was speculated early on, before the formation of the Nation Alliance, that every party besides those within the People's Alliance could come together under a broad tactical alliance in order to effectively nullify the 10% threshold. The 'zero threshold alliance' would have consisted of as many parties as possible, despite their differences, purely for tactical reasons.

== Parties ==
=== Party leadership elections ===
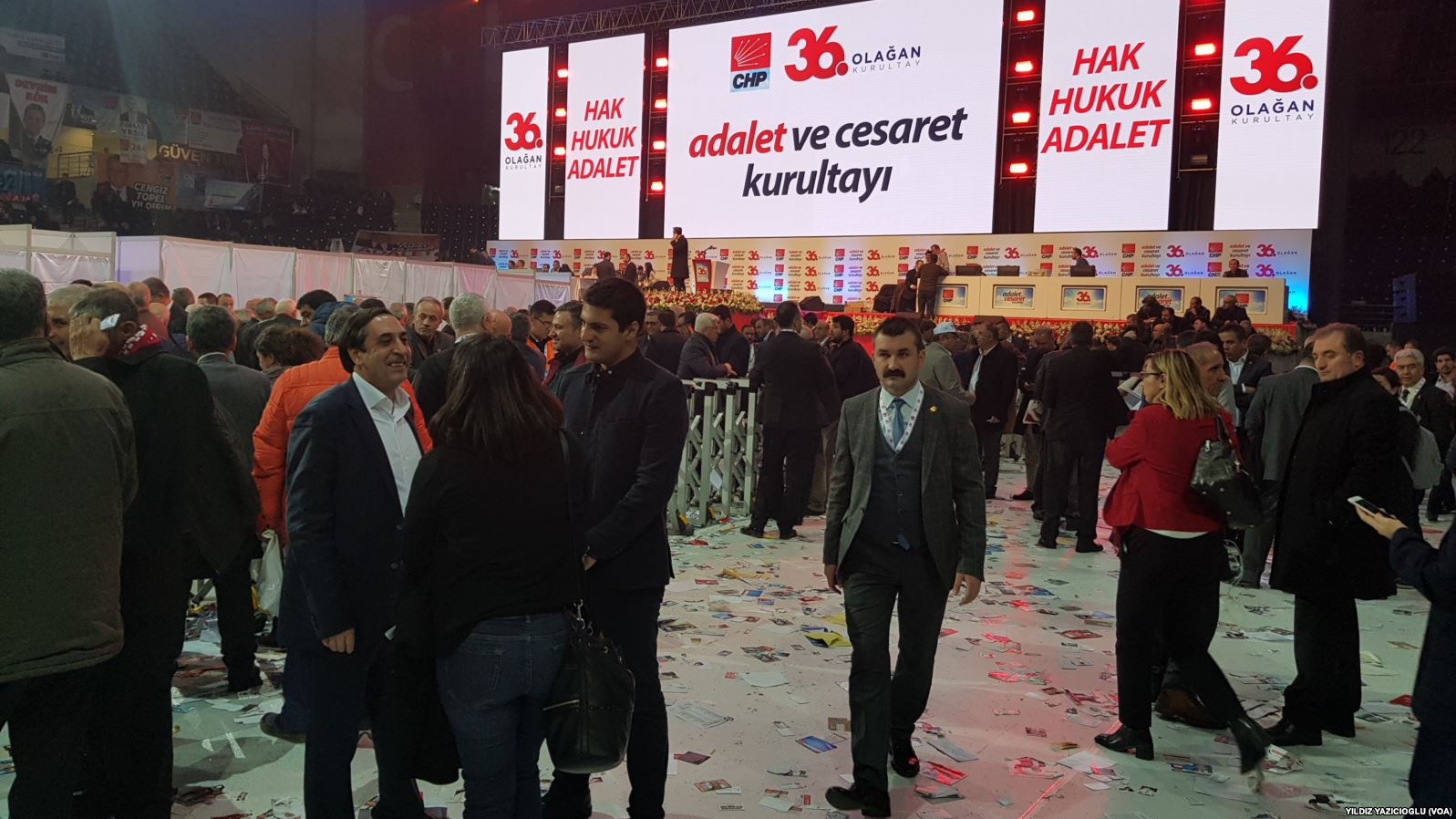
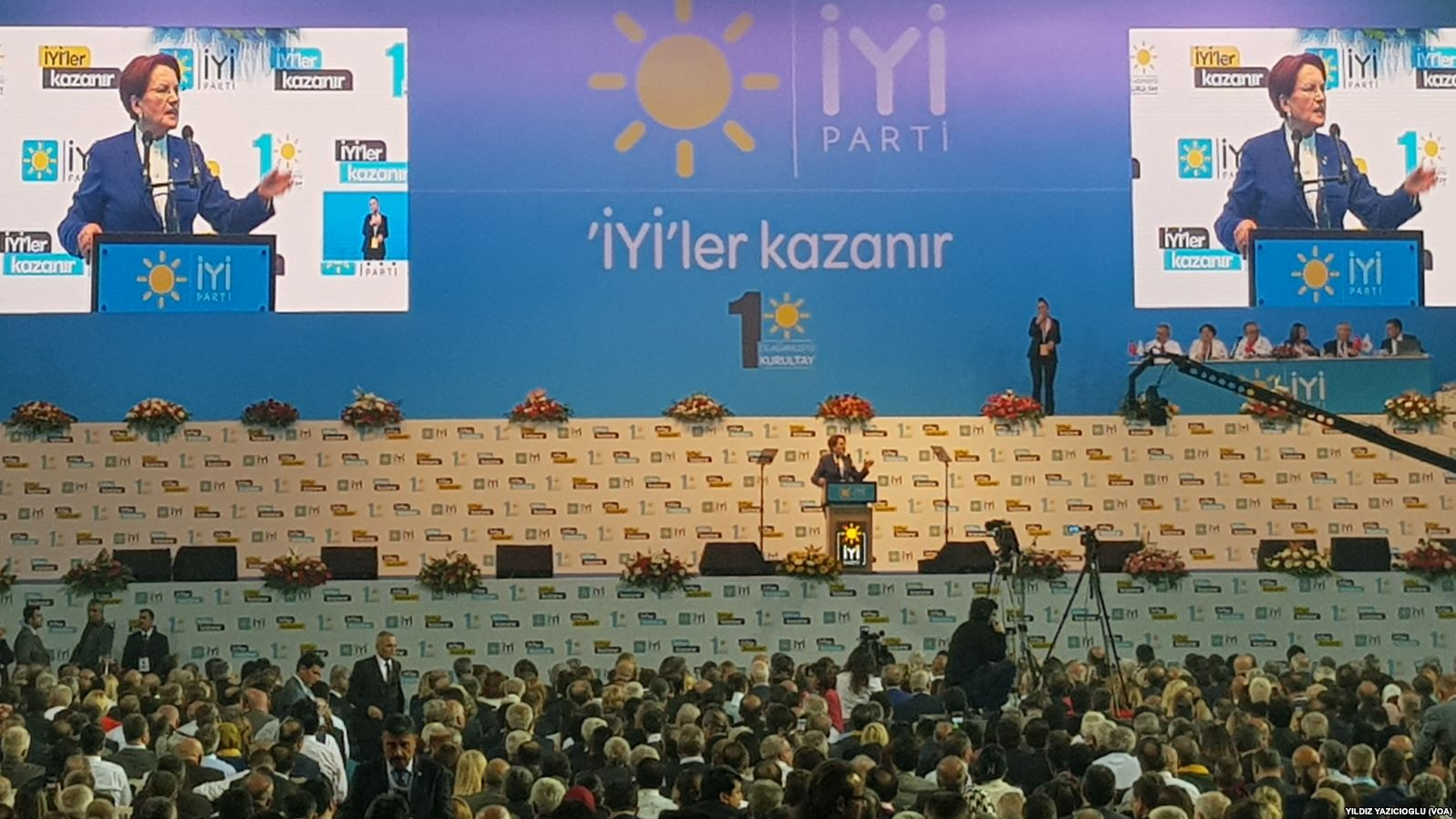
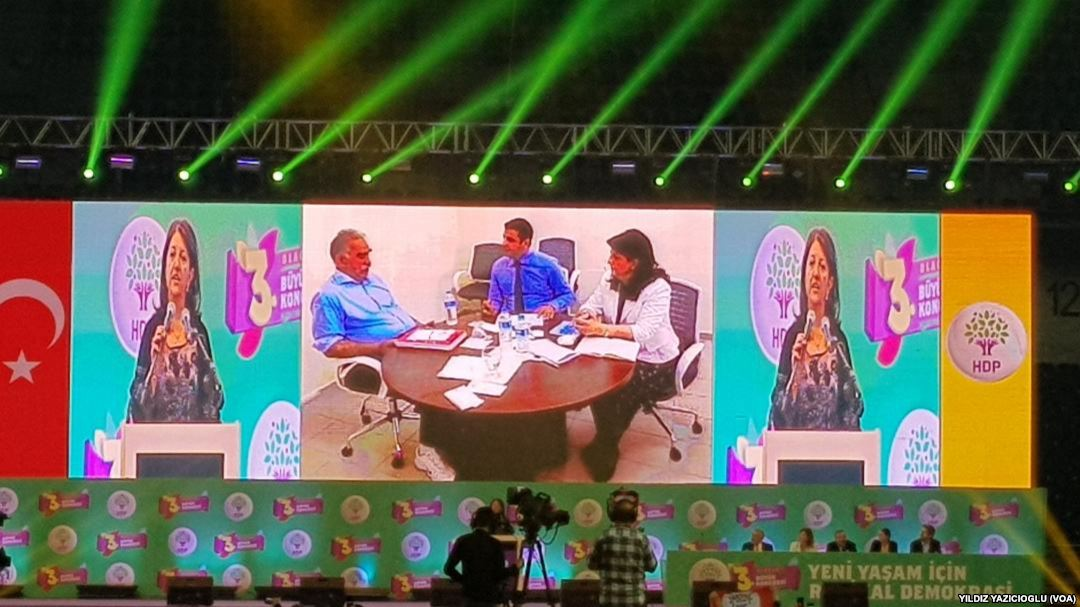

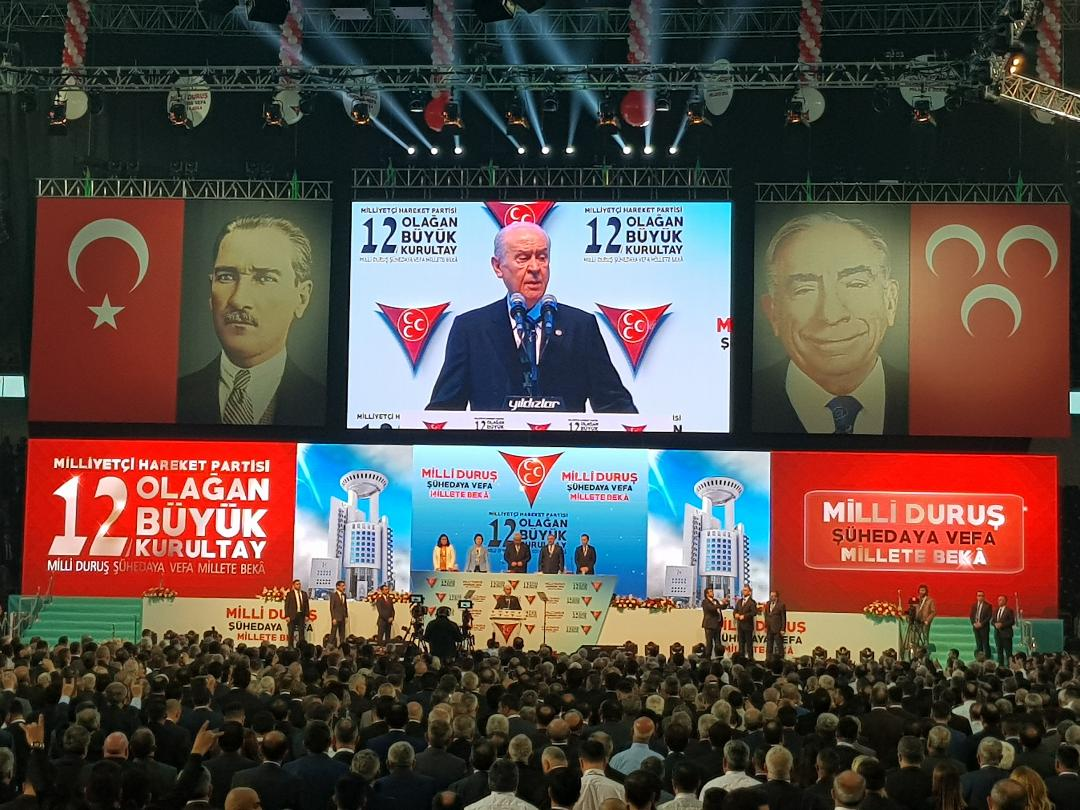
(From top to bottom): The CHP, İyi Party, HDP and MHP congresses respectively

Before the elections, a number of contesting parties held leadership elections to determine who would lead their party into the next elections. Although most of these leadership elections took place before the snap elections were called, they all determined the leaders that lead their respective parties through and beyond 3 November 2019, which was the original scheduled date of the election.

The Republican People's Party (CHP) held its 36th Ordinary Convention on 3 and 4 February 2018. Incumbent leader Kemal Kılıçdaroğlu was re-elected leader with 64% of the delegates' vote. He was challenged by Muharrem İnce, who received the remaining 36%. The convention became known for its poor organisation and irregularities during the candidate nomination process, with İnce subsequently alleging foul play in the ensuring election.

The İyi Party held its extraordinary congress on 1 April 2018 as part of its preparations for the then-scheduled 2019 elections. The congress was held as a result of negotiations with the Supreme Electoral Council of Turkey (YSK) over whether the party would be eligible to contest future elections, which had resulted in the YSK claiming that the party had not yet completed all its provincial congresses. The party's leader and presidential candidate Meral Akşener was re-elected unanimously with 1,060 votes.

The Peoples' Democratic Party (HDP) held its 3rd ordinary congress on 11 February 2018 to elect both a chairman and a chairwoman. The party's previous chairman, Selahattin Demirtaş, was imprisoned at the time and announced that he would not run again for the chairmanship. The party's serving chairwoman Serpil Kemalbay, elected in the 3rd Extraordinary Congress in 2017 to replace imprisoned chairwoman Figen Yüksekdağ, decided to not run again. As a result, Sezai Temelli and Pervin Buldan were elected chairman and chairwoman respectively, with 823 votes.

The Nationalist Movement Party (MHP) held its 12th ordinary congress on 18 March 2018. Incumbent leader Devlet Bahçeli, who had been leader since 1997, was re-elected unopposed with 1,167 votes. The MHP had undergone a turbulent congress dispute in 2016, with many dissidents unhappy with Bahçeli's leadership aiming to hold an extraordinary congress, resulting in a legal battle between the MHP executive and dissident leadership candidates. The dispute resulted in the MHP executive winning the legal battle, allegedly with the covert help of the Ministry of Justice, with most of the dissidents subsequently being expelled.

=== İyi Party controversy ===
The İyi Party, formed on 25 October 2017, was subject to wide speculation over whether it would be eligible to contest the elections. It was speculated that the AK Party and MHP purposefully chose the date of 24 June to prevent İyi from contesting the election, as it was previously announced by İyi General Secretary Aytun Çıray that the party would be eligible to contest any election as of 28 June. The claim was later revealed to be a deliberate lie, with Çıray later claiming that the correct date was 10 June (six months after their ordinary congress) and that he purposefully gave a misleading date to fool the AK Party. Conflicting rumours were then reported that the AK Party had proposed a change in the law that would guarantee that İyi would stand in order to prevent a loss of support for perceived undemocratic practices, although the proposal was blocked by the MHP. Both parties denied the reports, and blamed the İyi Party for incompetence in the event that it was found to be eligible to contest the election.

The Supreme Electoral Council (YSK) initially announced that it did not know whether İyi could participate, as the Court of Cassation was responsible for analysing the eligible parties. On 21 April, the Court announced that İyi was eligible. However, the YSK refused to ratify the announcement, causing accusations by the opposition that the government was trying to prevent İyi from running. On 22 April, 15 Republican People's Party (CHP) MPs resigned and joined the İyi Party at the request of CHP leader Kemal Kılıçdaroğlu, thereby allowing İyi to form a parliamentary group and guaranteeing them eligibility to run in the election. The YSK announced that İyi would be able to run in the elections on 23 April.

=== Contesting parties ===
The table below shows the 8 of the 11 eligible parties that submitted candidate lists to the Supreme Electoral Council (YSK) before the 21 May 17:00 deadline, thereby contesting the election. The table shows the parties and alliances in the order they will appear on the ballot paper.

Ballot #	Coalition	Party		Ideology	Leader
1	People's Alliance	AK PARTİ	Justice and Development Party; Adalet ve Kalkınma Partisi	Social conservatism	Recep Tayyip Erdoğan
2	People's Alliance	MHP	Nationalist Movement Party; Milliyetçi Hareket Partisi	Ultranationalism	Devlet Bahçeli
3	None	HÜDA PAR	Free Cause Party; Hür Dava Partisi	Pan-Islamism	Mehmet Yavuz
4	None	VATAN PARTİSİ	Patriotic Party; Vatan Partisi	Left-wing nationalism	Doğu Perinçek
5	None	HDP	Peoples' Democratic Party; Halkların Demokratik Partisi	Minority rights	Pervin Buldan; Sezai Temelli
6	Nation Alliance	CHP	Republican People's Party; Cumhuriyet Halk Partisi	Kemalism	Kemal Kılıçdaroğlu
7	Nation Alliance	SAADET	Felicity Party; Saadet Partisi	Millî Görüş	Temel Karamollaoğlu
8	Nation Alliance	İYİ PARTİ	Good Party; İYİ Parti	Kemalism	Meral Akşener

=== Eligible parties ===
The below table shows the remaining 3 of the 11 eligible parties that were eligible to contest the election but decided not to field candidates.

Party		Ideology	Leader	Supporting alliance	Course of action
DP	Democratic Party; Demokrat Parti	Liberal conservatism	Gültekin Uysal	Nation Alliance	✓ Contesting from İyi Party list
BÜYÜK BİRLİK	Great Unity Party; Büyük Birlik Partisi	Sunni Islamism	Mustafa Destici	People's Alliance	✓ Contesting from AK Party list
BTP	Independent Turkey Party; Bağımsız Türkiye Partisi	Economic nationalism	Haydar Baş	None (Sympathetic to the Nation Alliance)	✗ Boycotting

== Endorsements ==
Several non-governmental organisations and parties not eligible to contest the election announced their support for specific parties or alliances throughout the election campaign.

=== Other parties ===
Alliance	Endorsement	Ideology
People's Alliance	Motherland Party (ANAP)	Social conservatism
People's Alliance	AS Party (ASP)	Pro-military
Nation Alliance	Democratic Left Party (DSP)	Democratic socialism

=== NGOs and unions ===
Alliance	Endorsement	Type of organisation
People's Alliance	Menzil Order	Religious order
People's Alliance	All Industrialists and Businesspersons Association (TÜMSİAD)	Association
People's Alliance	World Virtuous Industrialists and Businesspersons Association (DERSİAD)	Association
People's Alliance	National Unity and Brotherhood Federation	NGO
People's Alliance	Ottoman Hearths	Political organisation
Nation Alliance	Nur movement	Religious order

== Opinion polls ==
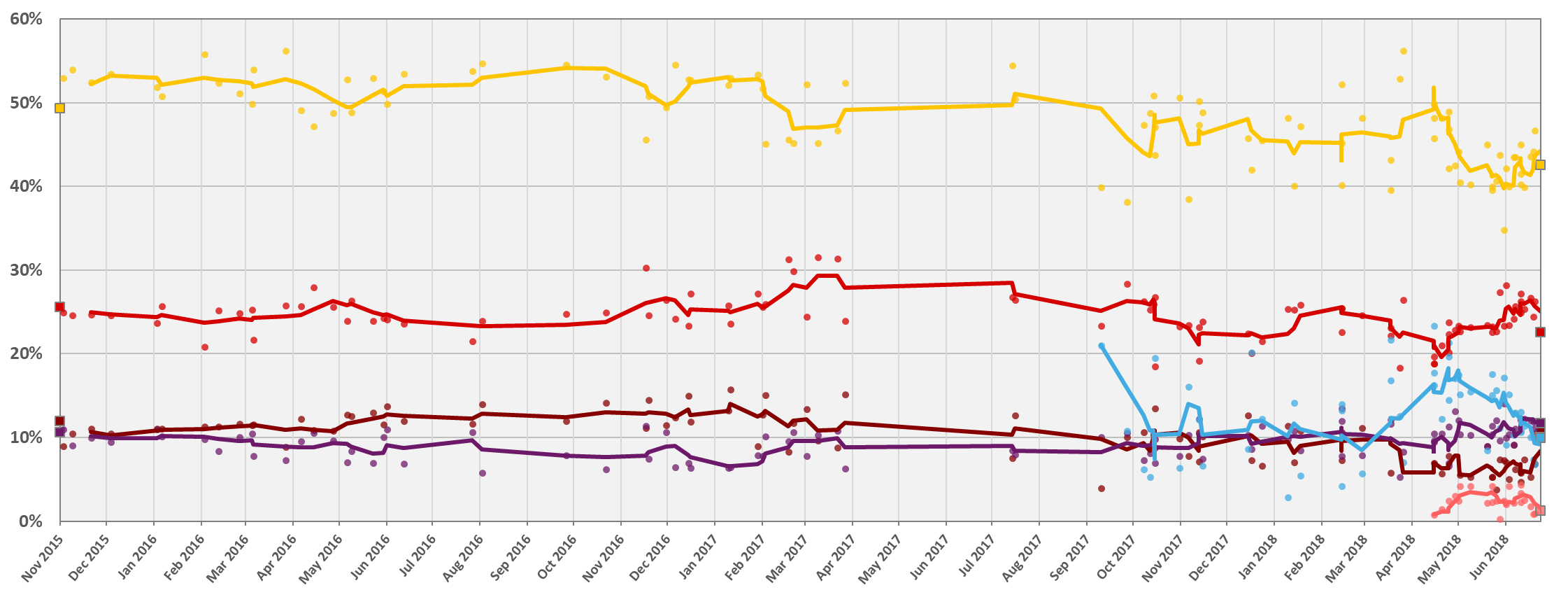

== MPs standing down ==
According to recent constitutional changes, presidential candidates cannot be MPs. As a result, Muharrem İnce and Selahattin Demirtaş stood down. In addition, MPs cannot be ministers in the new cabinet. Several current MPs from AK Party are rumoured to be reserved for ministerial positions, thus not nominated.

Justice and Development Party
- Ayşenur Bahçekapılı
- Recai Berber
- Öznur Çalık
- Canan Candemir Çelik
- Ahmet Davutoğlu
- Süreyya Sadi Bilgiç
- Lütfi Elvan
- Mehmet Erdem
- Mehmet Erdoğan
- Veysel Eroğlu
- Ahmet İyimaya
- Fikri Işık
- İsmail Kahraman
- Sabahattin Karakelle
- Orhan Karasayar
- Burhan Kayatürk
- Feyzullah Kıyıklık
- Mehmet Müezzinoğlu
- Mehmet Şimşek
- Yılmaz Tunç
- Necdet Ünüvar
- Cevdet Yılmaz
Republican People's Party
- Erdal Aksünger
- Aytuğ Atıcı
- Hüseyin Çamak
- Ceyhun Irgil
- Bihlun Tamaylıgil
- Aydın Uslupehlivan
Peoples' Democratic Party
- Selahattin Demirtaş
İyi Party
- Yusuf Halaçoğlu

== Results ==
Party or alliance		Votes	%	Seats	+/–
People's Alliance	Justice and Development Party	21,338,693	42.56	295	–22
People's Alliance	Nationalist Movement Party	5,565,331	11.10	49	+9
People's Alliance	Total	26,904,024	53.66	344	–13
Nation Alliance	Republican People's Party	11,354,190	22.65	146	+12
Nation Alliance	Good Party	4,993,479	9.96	43	New
Nation Alliance	Felicity Party	672,139	1.34	0	0
Nation Alliance	Total	17,019,808	33.95	189	+55
People's Democratic Party		5,867,302	11.70	67	+8
Free Cause Party		155,539	0.31	0	New
Patriotic Party		114,872	0.23	0	0
Independents		75,630	0.15	0	0
Total		50,137,175	100.00	600	+50
Valid votes		50,137,175	97.94		
Invalid/blank votes		1,052,269	2.06		
Total votes		51,189,444	100.00		
Registered voters/turnout		59,367,469	86.22		
Source: YSK

== Controversies ==
The election process was overshadowed by multiple allegations of violations of its integrity. Prominent among them was the allegation of widespread ballot stuffing for the benefit of AK Party and MHP parties in Turkey's east, in particular in Şanlıurfa province.

During a leaked speech of a private meeting with AK Party officials in early June, Erdogan ordered them to go in great number as official representatives in voting locations as to be the majority and seize control of the ballot boxes, ensuring that the "work there would be finished before it even started". He also ordered them to target HDP voters with the help of AK Party local officials who he assured them would be in possession of voters lists to help with their "special work". All this in order to ensure HDP would fail below the 10% quorum, which would greatly help AK Party and prevent a repeat of the "7 june experience". The video have been negatively commented by opposition candidates.

On 14 June, 4 to 5 people were killed in Suruc, a predominantly Turkish-Kurds town, following AK Party touring of the local market.
