= Opinion polling for the 2018 Turkish general election =

In the run up to the 2018 Turkish general election scheduled to take place on 24 June 2018, various organisations carry out opinion polling to gauge voting intention in Turkey. Results of such polls are displayed in this article. These polls only include Turkish voters nationwide and do not take into account Turkish expatriates voting abroad. The date range for these opinion polls are from the previous general election, held on 1 November 2015, to the present day.

== Presidential election ==
=== First round ===
==== Graphical summary ====
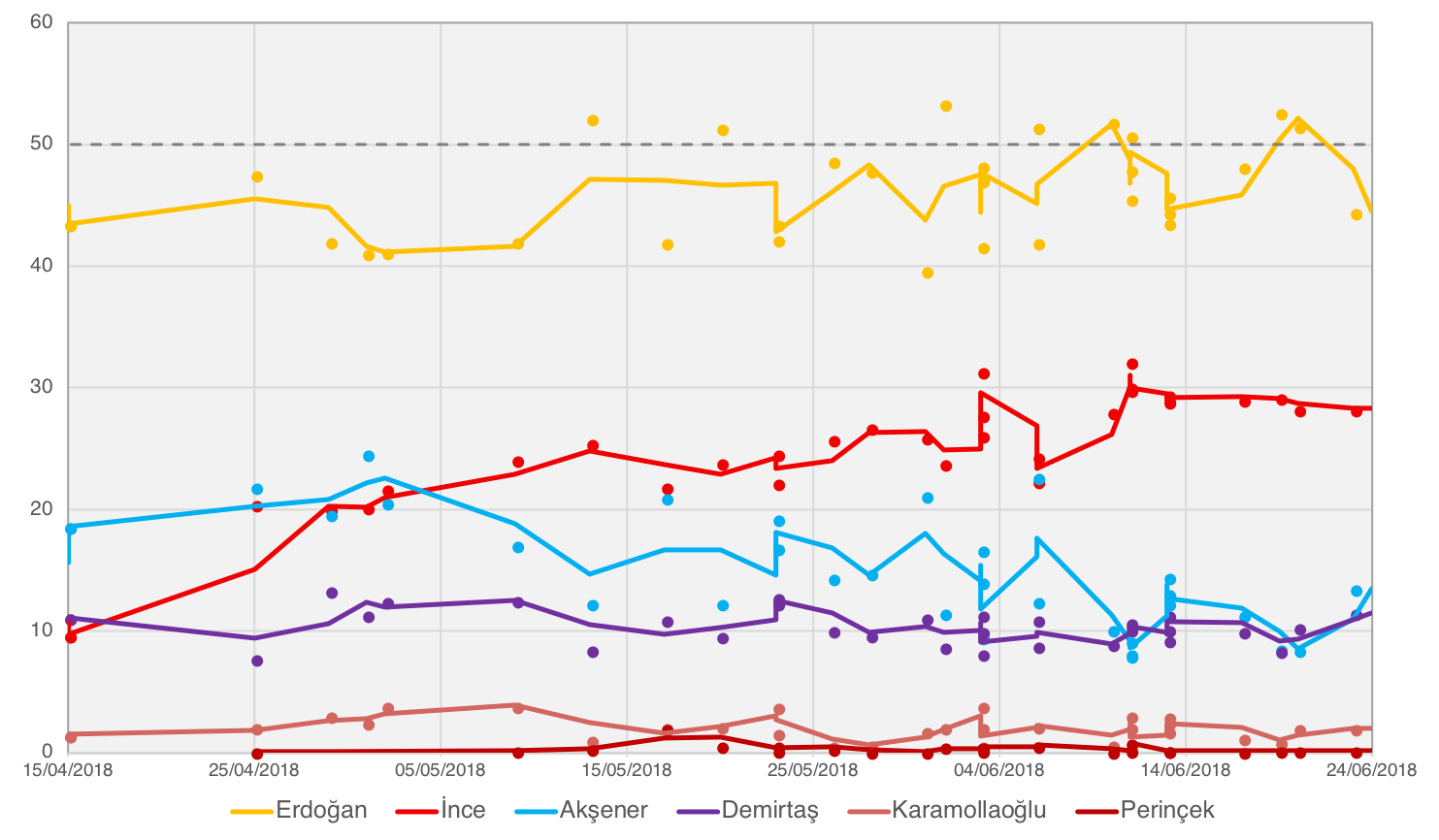

==== Following candidate selection ====
Light red denotes polls that were released after the polling ban came into effect, thereby violating Turkish electoral law.

Date	Pollster	Sample size	Erdoğan	İnce	Akşener	Demirtaş	Karamollaoğlu	Perinçek	Lead #1	Lead #2
24 June 2018	Election^{[a]}	–	52.3	30.8	7.4	8.3	0.9	0.2	21.5	22.5
23 Jun 2018	AKAM	–	44.5	28.3	13.5	11.5	2.0	0.2	16.2	14.8
14–20 Jun 2018		2,100	51.6	28.0	8.5	10.3	1.1	0.5	23.6	17.7
17–19 Jun 2018	ORC	4,250	52.7	29.2	8.6	8.4	0.9	0.2	23.5	17.7
16–17 Jun 2018	Gezici	1,812	48.2	29.1	11.4	10.0	1.2	0.1	19.1	17.7
14 Jun 2018	A pre-election ban on opinion polling comes into effect, ten days before polling day									
13 Jun 2018	Plus Mayak	–	45.8	28.9	13.1	10.2	1.8	0.2	16.9	15.8
13 Jun 2018	AKAM	2,460	44.5	29.0	14.5	9.3	2.5	0.2	15.5	15.5
6–13 Jun 2018	REMRES	5,674	43.6	29.5	12.3	11.4	3.0	0.2	14.1	17.2
11 Jun 2018	CHP	–	45.6	32.2	8.2	10.7	3.1	0.2	13.4	24.0
9-10 Jun 2018	Konda	2,721	51.9	28.0	10.2	9.0	0.7	0.1	23.9	17.8
8–11 Jun 2018	Mediar	2,410	48.0	29.9	9.2	10.2	2.1	0.8	18.1	19.7
7–11 Jun 2018	Foresight	500	50.8	30.1	8.0	10.5	0.4	N/A	20.7	19.6
6 Jun 2018	İYİ Party	–	42.0	22.4	22.7	11.0	1.9		19.3	0.3
1–6 Jun 2018	MAK	5,400	51.5	24.4	12.5	8.8	2.2	0.6	27.1	11.9
2–3 Jun 2018	Gezici	2,814	47.1	27.8	14.1	10.0	0.6	0.4	19.3	13.7
29 May–3 Jun 2018	SONAR	3,000	48.3	31.4	9.5	8.2	2.1	0.5	16.9	21.9
28 May–3 Jun 2018	REMRES	4,482	41.7	26.1	16.7	11.4	3.9	0.2	15.6	9.4
28 May–1 Jun 2018	ORC	3,410	53.4	23.8	11.5	8.7	2.1	0.5	29.6	12.3
26–31 May 2018	PİAR	2,620	39.7	26.0	21.2	11.1	1.8	0.1	13.7	5.2
25–26 May 2018	Gezici	6,811	48.7	25.8	14.4	10.1	0.6	0.4	22.9	11.4
1–28 May 2018	Konsensus	2,000	47.9	26.8	14.8	9.7	0.7	0.1	21.1	12.0
22–23 May 2018	Mediar	4,268	43.5	22.2	19.3	12.8	1.6	0.6	21.3	2.9
17–23 May 2018	REMRES	4,276	42.2	24.6	16.9	12.3	3.8	0.2	17.6	7.7
13–20 May 2018	MAK	5,000	51.4	23.9	12.3	9.6	2.2	0.6	27.5	11.6
7–17 May 2018	SONAR	3,000	42.0	21.9	21.0	11.0	2.1	2.0	20.1	0.9
25 Apr–13 May 2018	Politic's	2,650	52.2	25.5	12.3	8.5	1.1	0.4	26.7	13.2
6–9 May 2018	REMRES	3,653	42.1	24.1	17.1	12.6	3.9	0.2	18.0	7.0
10 Aug 2014	Election^{[a]}	–	51.8 (Erdoğan)	38.4 (İhsanoğlu)	—	9.8 (Demirtaş)	—	—	13.4	28.6

==== Prior to candidate selection ====
Date	Pollster	Sample size	AKP	CHP	MHP	HDP	İYİ	SP	Others	Lead
2 May 2018	REMRES	2,586	41.2 (Erdoğan)	21.7 (generic)	—	12.5 (Demirtaş)	20.6 (Akşener)	3.9 (Karamollaoğlu)	0.1	19.5
1 May 2018	PİAR	–	41.1 (Erdoğan)	20.2 (generic)	—	11.4 (Demirtaş)	24.6 (Akşener)	2.5 (Karamollaoğlu)	0.2	16.5
26–29 Apr 2018	Mediar	2,660	42.1 (Erdoğan)	20.1 (generic)	—	13.4 (Demirtaş)	19.7 (Akşener)	3.1 (Karamollaoğlu)	1.6	22.0
24–25 Apr 2018	Konsensus	1,000	47.6 (Erdoğan)	20.5 (İnce)	—	7.8 (Demirtaş)	21.9 (Akşener)	2.1 (Karamollaoğlu)	0.1 (Perinçek)	25.7
14–15 Apr 2018		3,864	43.5 (Erdoğan)	9.7 (Kılıçdaroğlu)	—	11.1 (Türk)	18.6 (Akşener)	1.5 (Karamollaoğlu)	9.5 (Başbuğ); 5.3 (Gül); 0.9 (Others)	24.9
4–14 Feb 2018	Ankara Analitik	1,619	46.4 (Erdoğan)	12.7 (Kılıçdaroğlu)	—	—	12.7 (Akşener)	—	15.2 (Gül); 7.0 (Şener)	33.7
4–14 Feb 2018	PİAR	2,440	43.2 (Erdoğan)	24.0 (generic)	—	13.1 (generic)	18.2 (Akşener)	—	1.5	19.2
14 Jan 2018	SONAR	3,000	46.4 (Erdoğan)	22.5 (generic)	—	9.5 (generic)	18.2 (Akşener)	—	3.4	23.9
10 Jan 2018	Konsensus	–	48.1 (generic)	25.1 (generic)	11.9 (generic)	9.6 (generic)	2.9 (generic)	—	2.4	23.0
10–15 Oct 2017	Gezici	4,638	47.8 (Erdoğan)	14.0 (Kılıçdaroğlu)	—	—	38.0 (Akşener)	—	—	9.8
27 Sep 2017	SONAR	–	48.2 (Erdoğan)	30.1 (generic)	—	8.8 (generic)	12.9 (Akşener)	—	—	18.1
10 Aug 2014	Election^{[a]}	–	51.8 (Erdoğan)	38.4 (İhsanoğlu)		9.8 (Demirtaş)	—	—	—	13.4

==== Abroad ====
Date	Pollster	Country	Sample size	Erdoğan	İnce	Akşener	Demirtaş	Karamollaoğlu	Perinçek	Lead #1	Lead #2
1-5 Jun 2018	TAVAK	Germany	1,184	48.2	28.7	9.2	10.2	2.8	0.9	19.5	18.5

=== Second round ===
==== Official candidates ====
===== Erdoğan vs. Akşener =====
Date	Pollster	Sample size	Erdoğan	Akşener	Lead
17–23 May 2018	REMRES	4,276	51.2	48.8	2.4
6–9 May 2018	REMRES	3,653	50.8	49.2	1.6
2 May 2018	REMRES	2,586	50.1	49.9	0.2
1 May 2018	PİAR	–	49.5	50.5	1.0
24–25 Apr 2018	Konsensus	1,000	52.4	47.6	4.8
14–15 Apr 2018		3,864	52.2	47.8	4.4
22–26 Mar 2018	ORC	5,620	59.6	40.4	19.2
6–18 Mar 2018	PİAR	5,620	50.5	49.5	1.0
2–17 Dec 2017	Gezici	4,238	51.4	48.6	2.8

===== Erdoğan vs. İnce =====
Date	Pollster	Sample size	Erdoğan	İnce	Lead
29 May–3 Jun 2018	SONAR	3,000	53.7	46.3	7.4
17–23 May 2018	REMRES	4,276	50.2	49.8	0.4
6–9 May 2018	REMRES	3,653	50.3	49.7	0.6
24–25 Apr 2018	Konsensus	1,000	55.1	44.9	10.2

==== Hypothetical candidates ====
Hypothetical candidates

===== Erdoğan vs. Gül =====
Date	Pollster	Sample size	Erdoğan	Gül	Lead
28 Apr 2018	Abdullah Gül declares he will not run for president				
14–15 Apr 2018		3,864	64.6	35.4	29.2
22–26 Mar 2018	ORC	5,620	67.7	32.3	35.4
8–14 Feb 2018	Optimar	1,500	62.2	37.8	24.4

===== Erdoğan vs. Kılıçdaroğlu =====
Date	Pollster	Sample size	Erdoğan	Kılıçdaroğlu	Lead
4 May 2018	Konsensus	1,000	57.7	42.3	15.4
1 May 2018	PİAR	–	53.0	47.0	6.0
29 Apr 2018	Kemal Kılıçdaroğlu declares he will not run for president				
22–26 Mar 2018	ORC	5,620	62.0	38.0	24.0
6–18 Mar 2018	PİAR	–	52.0	48.0	4.0

== Parliamentary election ==
Poll results are listed in the tables below in reverse chronological order, showing the most recent first, and using the date the survey's fieldwork was done, as opposed to the date of publication. If such date is unknown, the date of publication is given instead. The highest percentage figure in each polling survey is displayed in bold, and the background shaded in the leading party's colour. In the instance that there is a tie, then no figure is shaded. The lead column on the right shows the percentage-point difference between the two parties with the highest figures. When a specific poll does not show a data figure for a party, the party's cell corresponding to that poll is shown empty.

=== Graphical summary ===
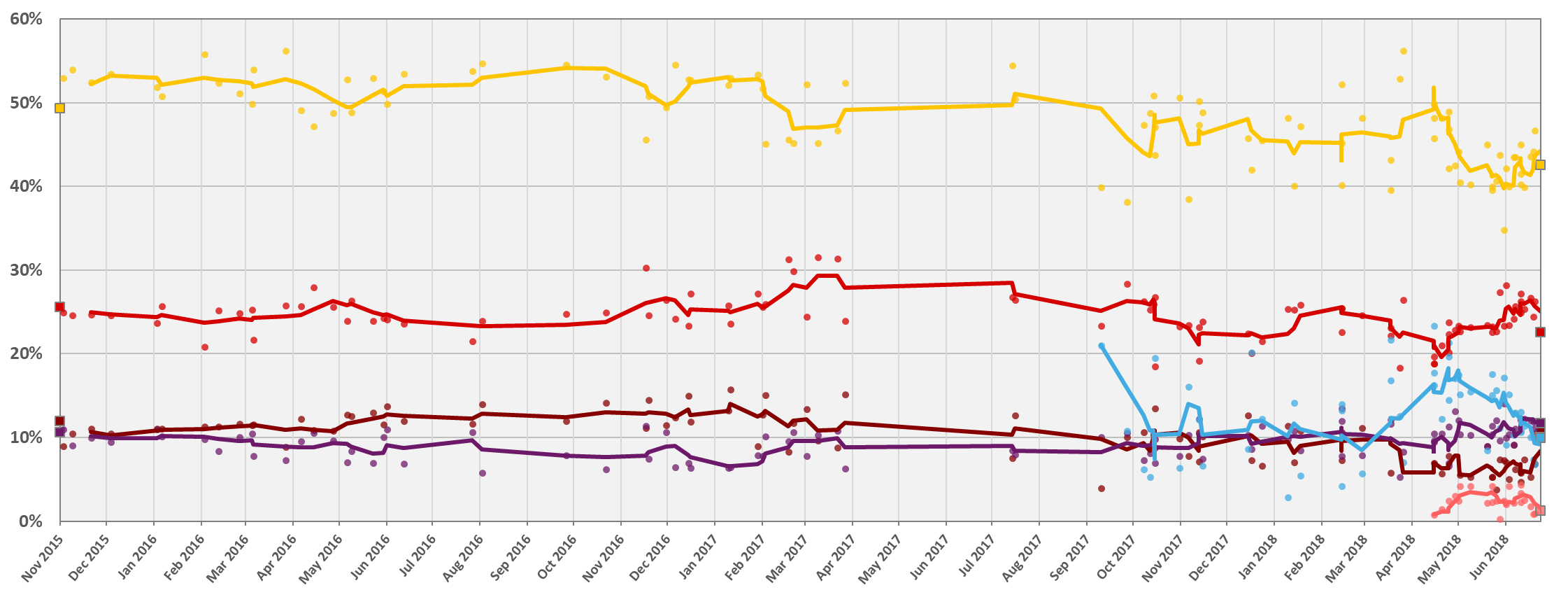

=== Party vote ===
Light red denotes polls that were released after the polling ban came into effect, thereby violating Turkish electoral law.

Date	Pollster	Sample size	AKP	CHP	MHP	HDP	İYİ	SP	Others	Lead
24 June 2018	Election^{[a]}	–	42.8	22.8	11.2	11.5	10.1	1.3	0.7	20
14–20 Jun 2018		2,100	46.7	26.3	6.9	11.2	6.8	1.0	1.2	20.4
17–19 Jun 2018	ORC	4,250	44.2	24.5	10.5	11.9	7.4	0.9	0.6	19.7
16–17 Jun 2018	Gezici	1,812	43.6	26.7	5.3	12.1	10.1	1.8	0.4	16.9
14 Jun 2018	**A pre-election ban on opinion polling comes into effect, ten days before polling day**									
13 Jun 2018	Plus Mayak	–	39.9	25.4	7.4	12.3	11.4	2.6	1.0	14.5
11 Jun 2018	CHP	–	40.3	27.2	4.7	12.3	10.8	4.4	0.3	13.1
8–11 Jun 2018	Mediar	2,410	41.5	26.3	5.8	12.1	10.7	2.3	1.3	15.2
8–11 Jun 2018	Metropoll	2,888	45.0	25.0	6.0	12.3	13.1	3.4	0.2	20
9–10 Jun 2018	Konda	2,721	45.5	26.1	7.3	11.6	8.5	1.0		19.4
7 Jun 2018	Gezici	–	43.5	25.7	6.2	11.1	13.0	—	0.5	17.8
1–6 Jun 2018	MAK	5,400	43.5	24.2	9.2	9.2	10.3	2.2	1.5	19.3
28 May–3 Jun 2018	REMRES	4,482	40.0	23.5	5.1	10.4	15.2	4.2	1.6	16.5
29 May–1 Jun 2018	Sonar	3,000	42.2	28.2	7.1	10.0	9.2	2.1	1.2	14.0
26–31 May 2018	PİAR	2,620	34.8	23.4	7.3	14.1	17.2	2.5	0.7	11.4
1–28 May 2018	Konsensus	2,000	43.8	27.4	7.4	9.7	11.2	0.3	0.2	16.4
23–26 May 2018	İEA	1,500	40.7	22.7	3.8	12.1	15.7	2.5	2.5	18.0
22–23 May 2018	Mediar	4,268	39.6	22.6	5.3	11.4	17.6	2.3	1.2	17.0
17–23 May 2018	REMRES	4,276	40.0	23.3	5.3	10.4	15.1	4.2	1.7	16.7
13–20 May 2018	MAK	5,000	45.0	23.5	9.0	9.0	8.5	2.2	2.8	21.5
6–9 May 2018	REMRES	3,653	40.3	23.2	5.3	10.3	15.5	4.2	1.2	17.1
2 May 2018	REMRES	2,586	40.5	22.7	5.6	10.4	15.2	4.2	1.3	17.8
1 May 2018		–	44.2	23.4	with AKP	12.1	17.5	2.5	0.3	20.8
1 May 2018		–	44.0	32.2	with AKP	with CHP	23.3	with İYİ	0.5	11.8
1 May 2018		–	44.7	40.2	with AKP	14.9	with CHP	with CHP	0.2	4.5
1 May 2018		–	41.6	23.9	with AKP	11.4	22.8	with İYİ	0.3	17.7
1 May 2018		–	46.8	53.0	with AKP	with CHP	with CHP	with CHP	0.2	6.2
26–29 Apr 2018	Mediar	2,660	42.5	22.9	with AKP	13.2	17.1	3.1	1.2	19.6
25 Apr 2018	SONAR	–	46.9	23.8	with AKP	11.3	14.5	with İYİ	—	23.1
24–25 Apr 2018	Konsensus	1,000	49.0	22.4	with AKP	6.7	21.4	with İYİ	0.5	26.6
24–25 Apr 2018	Konsensus	1,000	42.2	20.2	7.8	7.0	19.7	2.5	0.4	22.0
18 Apr 2018	Early elections are called for 24 June 2018									
13–20 Apr 2018	MetroPOLL	2,063	48.2	21.0	5.7	10.5	12.3	1.5	0.8	27.2
14–15 Apr 2018		3,864	45.8	19.7	7.0	9.7	16.3	0.8	0.7	26.1
14–15 Apr 2018		3,864	48.2	18.9	with AKP	9.5	23.4	with İYİ	0.0	24.8
14–15 Apr 2018		3,864	49.9	18.9	with AKP	10.5	17.8	—	2.9	31.0
22–26 Mar 2018	ORC	5,620	56.2	26.5	with AKP	8.3	7.1	—	1.9	29.7
14–24 Mar 2018	Ankara Analitik	1,619	52.9	18.4	with AKP	5.3	12.6	—	—	34.5
6–18 Mar 2018	PİAR	5,620	39.6	22.2	5.8	12.2	16.9	—	0.8	17.4
6–18 Mar 2018	PİAR	5,620	44.2	31.1	with AKP	—	24.3	—	0.4	13.1
6–18 Mar 2018	PİAR	5,620	53.1	35.4	with AKP	11.1	—	—	0.4	17.7
6–18 Mar 2018	PİAR	5,620	43.2	23.1	with AKP	11.7	21.7	—	0.3	20.1
23–27 Feb 2018	ORC	3,420	48.2	24.6	11.2	7.9	5.7	—	2.4	23.6
8–14 Feb 2018	Optimar	1,500	52.2	22.6	10.7	7.8	4.2	—	2.5	29.6
4–14 Feb 2018	PİAR	2,440	40.2	25.5	7.3	12.0	13.3	—	1.7	14.7
4–14 Feb 2018	PİAR	2,440	45.2	25.5	with AKP	13.5	14.0	—	1.9	19.7
18 Jan 2018	ORC	–	47.2	25.9	10.8	8.5	5.5	—	2.1	21.3
14 Jan 2018	SONAR	3,000	40.1	25.3	7.1	10.8	14.2	—	2.5	14.8
10 Jan 2018	Konsensus	–	48.2	25.4	11.4	9.8	2.9	—	2.4	22.8
24 Dec 2017	İEA	1,537	45.5	21.5	6.7	11.4	12.3	—	2.3	24.0
2–17 Dec 2017	Gezici	4,238	42.0	20.1	7.3	8.7	20.2	—	1.7	21.9
1–15 Dec 2017	AAA	40,800	45.8	22.5	12.7	10.3	8.7	—	0.0	23.3
9–15 Nov 2017	ORC	2,674	48.9	23.9	10.2	7.5	6.7	—	2.8	25.0
13 Nov 2017	AKP	–	50.2	23.2	10.7	10.5	—	—	5.5	27.0
1–13 Nov 2017	İEA	1,537	47.4	19.2	7.2	12.3	12.2	—	1.6	28.2
1–6 Nov 2017	Sonar	3,000	38.5	23.5	7.8	10.3	16.1	—	3.8	15.0
31 Oct 2017	Optimar	1,547	50.6	23.3	9.9	7.8	6.4	—	2.0	27.3
10–15 Oct 2017		4,638	43.8	18.5	8.8	7.0	19.5	—	2.4	24.3
10–15 Oct 2017		4,638	47.1	26.8	13.5	9.8	—	—	2.8	20.3
14 Oct 2017	Konda	2,646	50.9	26.0	10.3	10.5	—	—	2.3	24.9
5–12 Oct 2017	MAK	–	48.8	25.3	8.9	8.2	5.3	—	3.6	23.5
6–8 Oct 2017	ORC	2,580	47.4	26.3	10.7	7.3	6.2	—	2.1	21.1
27 Sep 2017	Sonar	–	38.2	28.4	10.1	10.6	10.8	—	1.9	9.8
2–10 Sep 2017		4,322	39.9	23.4	4.0	10.1	21.0	—	1.6	16.5
10–16 Jul 2017	MAK	5,400	50.5	26.5	12.7	8.0	—	—	2.3	24.0
5–14 Jul 2017	Konensus	1,500	54.5	26.8	7.6	8.5	—	—	2.6	27.7
16 Apr 2017	2017 Turkish constitutional referendum									
24–27 Mar 2017	ORC	2,740	52.4	24.0	15.2	6.3	—	—	2.1	28.4
18–22 Mar 2017	AKAM	2,032	46.7	31.4	8.8	10.8	—	—	2.2	15.3
3–9 Mar 2017	AKAM	8,120	45.2	31.6	9.7	10.3	—	—	3.2	13.6
25 Feb–2 Mar 2017	MAK	5,400	52.2	24.5	13.4	7.8	—	—	2.2	27.7
16–21 Feb 2017	AKAM	4,060	45.2	29.9	11.8	10.7	—	—	2.4	15.3
10–18 Feb 2017	THEMİS	1,985	45.6	31.3	8.3	9.6	—	—	5.2	14.3
3 Feb 2017		–	45.1	26.0	15.1	10.2	—	—	3.6	19.1
26 Jan-1 Feb 2017	MAK	5,400	51.7	25.6	12.8	7.8	—	—	2.3	26.1
24–29 Jan 2017	Konsensus	1,117	53.4	27.2	9.0	7.9	—	—	2.5	26.2
10–11 Jan 2017	ORC	2,340	53.0	23.6	15.8	6.5	—	—	1.1	29.4
3–10 Jan 2017	Optimar	2,043	52.1	25.8	13.3	6.4	—	—	2.4	26.3
7–16 Dec 2016	KHAS	1,000	52.7	27.2	11.9	6.4	—	—	1.9	25.5
15 Dec 2016	ORC	2,450	52.8	23.4	15.0	7.0	—	—	1.8	29.4
21 Nov–6 Dec 2016	İVEM	3,650	54.6	24.2	12.4	6.5	—	—	2.3	30.4
30 Nov 2016	MetroPOLL	–	49.5	26.5	11.5	10.7	—	—	1.8	23.0
15–19 Nov 2016	MAK	5,400	50.8	24.6	14.5	7.5	—	—	2.6	26.2
9–17 Nov 2016	AKAM	4,240	45.6	30.3	11.2	11.4	—	—	1.5	15.3
22 Oct 2016	ORC	–	53.1	25.0	14.2	6.2	—	—	1.5	28.1
24–26 Sep 2016	A&G	3,018	54.6	24.8	12.0	7.9	—	—	0.7	29.8
2 Aug 2016	ORC	–	54.7	24.0	14.0	5.8	—	—	1.5	30.7
27 Jul 2016	Optimar	1,273	53.8	21.5	11.7	10.7	—	—	2.3	32.3
5–12 Jun 2016	ORC	2,240	53.5	23.6	12.0	6.9	—	—	4.0	29.9
1 Jun 2016	MetroPOLL	3,000	49.9	24.1	13.8	11.0	—	—	1.2	25.8
30 May 2016	Optimar	1,508	51.4	24.3	11.6	10.1	—	—	2.7	27.1
23 May 2016	ORC	–	53.0	24.0	13.0	7.0	—	—	3.0	29.0
22–24 May 2016	Binali Yıldırım becomes Prime Minister of Turkey following the resignation of Ahmet Davutoğlu									
9 May 2016	KamuAR	2,493	48.9	26.4	12.6	8.4	—	—	3.7	22.5
5–6 May 2016	ORC	1,265	52.8	24.0	12.8	7.1	—	—	3.3	28.8
27 Apr 2016	Sonar	–	48.8	25.6	10.8	9.7	—	—	5.1	23.2
10–14 Apr 2016	AKAM	1,214	47.2	28.0	10.9	10.6	—	—	3.3	19.2
6 Apr 2016	KamuAR	3,917	49.1	25.7	12.3	9.6	—	—	3.3	23.4
26–27 Mar 2016	Gezici	–	56.2	25.8	8.9	7.3	—	—	1.8	30.4
2–6 Mar 2016	ORC	4,176	54.0	21.7	11.6	7.8	—	—	4.9	32.3
5 Mar 2016	MetroPOLL	–	49.9	25.3	11.5	10.5	—	—	2.8	24.6
26 Feb 2016	KONDA	2,150	51.1	24.9	11.7	10.1	—	—	2.2	25.9
12 Feb 2016	İVEM	–	52.4	25.2	11.3	8.4	—	—	2.7	27.2
27 Jan–3 Feb 2016	ORC	8,320	55.8	20.9	11.3	9.8	—	—	2.2	34.9
6 Jan 2016	GENAR	4,500	50.8	25.7	11.1	10.2	—	—	2.2	25.1
1–3 Jan 2016	Varyans	–	51.9	23.7	11.1	11.0	—	—	2.4	28.2
1–4 Dec 2015	MAK	5,500	53.5	24.6	10.5	9.5	—	—	1.9	28.9
16–21 Nov 2015	MAK	5,670	52.5	24.7	11.1	10.0	—	—	1.7	27.8
4–9 Nov 2015	ORC	3,230	54.0	24.6	10.5	9.1	—	—	1.8	29.4
2–3 Nov 2015	IPSOS	1,614	53.0	25.0	9.0	11.0	—	—	2.0	28.0
1 Nov 2015	Snap election^{[a]}	–	49.3	25.6	12.0	10.6	—	0.7	1.8	23.7
7 Jun 2015	Election^{[a]}	–	40.7	25.1	16.5	13.0	—	2.1	2.6	15.9
Date	Pollster	Sample size								Lead
Date	Pollster	Sample size	AKP	CHP	MHP	HDP	İYİ	SP	Others	Lead

^{a} Domestic vote only

==== Abroad ====
Date	Pollster	Country	Sample size	AKP	CHP	MHP	HDP	İYİ	SP	Others	Lead
1-5 Jun 2018	TAVAK	Germany	1,184	47.1	15.5	with AKP	17.9	8.3	1.9	0.2	**29.2**

=== Alliance vote ===
==== Following formation of alliances ====
Light red denotes polls that were released after the polling ban came into effect, thereby violating Turkish electoral law.

Date	Pollster	Sample size	Cumhur	Millet	HDP + others	Lead
24 June 2018	Election^{[a]}	–	53.7	33.9	11.7 + 0.7	19.8
23 Jun 2018	AKAM	–	45.9	40.4	13.4 + 0.3	5.4
17–19 Jun 2018	ORC	–	54.7	32.8	11.9 + 0.6	21.9
18 Jun 2018	Konsensus	10,000	52	41	7 + 0	11
16–17 Jun 2018	Gezici	1,812	48.9	38.6	12.1 + 0.4	10.3
14 Jun 2018	**A pre-election ban on opinion polling comes into effect, ten days before polling day**					
13 Jun 2018	Plus Mayak	–	47.3	39.4	12.3 + 1.0	7.9
13 Jun 2018	AKAM	2,460	45.6	39.9	13.6 + 0.9	5.7
6–13 Jun 2018	REMRES	5,674	45.1	42.5	12.1 + 0.3	2.6
8–11 Jun 2018	MetroPOLL	2,888	49.4	38.1	12.3 + 0.2	11.3
8–11 Jun 2018	Mediar	2,410	47.7	39.4	12.1 + 0.8	8.3
11 Jun 2018	CHP	–	45.0	42.4	12.3 + 0.3	2.6
1–6 Jun 2018	MAK	5,400	52.7	36.7	9.2 + 1.5	16.0
28 May–3 Jun 2018	REMRES	4,482	44.2	44.0	11.5 + 0.3	0.2
29 May–1 Jun 2018	Sonar	3,000	49.3	39.5	10.0 + 1.2	9.8
28 May–1 Jun 2018	ORC	3,410	52.8	35.6	10.9 + 0.7	17.2
26–31 May 2018	PİAR	2,620	42.1	43.1	14.1 + 0.7	1.0
1–28 May 2018	Konsensus	2,000	50.4	39.7	9.6 + 0.3	10.4
25–26 May 2018	Gezici	6,811	48.7	38.9	11.5 + 0.9	9.8
23–26 May 2018	İEA	1,500	44.5	40.5	13.5 + 1.5	4.0
22–23 May 2018	Mediar	4,268	45.6	42.5	11.4 + 0.5	2.4
17–23 May 2018	REMRES	4,276	43.9	43.7	12.1 + 0.3	0.2
13–20 May 2018	MAK	5,000	54.0	34.2	9.0 + 2.8	19.8
6–9 May 2018	REMRES	3,653	43.9	43.5	12.2 + 0.4	0.4
2 May 2018	REMRES	2,586	44.2	43.4	12.1 + 0.3	0.8

==== Prior to formation of alliances ====
Date	Pollster	Sample size	Cumhur	Millet	Others	Lead
1–3 May 2018	CHP, İYİ, SP and DP launch the Millet alliance					
1 May 2018		–	44.2	—	55.8	11.6
1 May 2018		–	44.0	—	56.0	11.5
1 May 2018		–	44.7	40.2	15.1	4.5
1 May 2018		–	41.6	—	58.4	16.8
1 May 2018		–	46.8	—	53.2	6.4
26–29 Apr 2018	Mediar	2,660	42.5	—	57.5	15.0
25 Apr 2018	SONAR	–	46.9	—	53.1	6.2
24–25 Apr 2018	Konsensus	1,000	49.0	—	51.0	2.0
14–15 Apr 2018		3,864	52.8	—	47.2	5.6
14–15 Apr 2018		3,864	49.9	—	50.1	0.2
14–15 Apr 2018		3,864	48.2	—	51.8	3.6
22–26 Mar 2018	ORC	5,620	56.2	—	43.8	12.4
14–24 Mar 2018	Ankara Analitik	1,619	52.9	—	47.1	5.8
6–18 Mar 2018	PİAR	5,620	45.4	—	54.6	9.2
6–18 Mar 2018	PİAR	5,620	44.2	—	55.8	11.6
6–18 Mar 2018	PİAR	5,620	53.1	—	46.9	6.2
6–18 Mar 2018	PİAR	5,620	43.2	—	56.8	13.6
20 Feb 2018	AKP and MHP launch the Cumhur alliance					

=== Seat projections ===
==== Parties ====
Date	Pollster	Sample size	AKP	CHP	MHP	HDP	İYİ	Others	Majority
24 June 2018	Result	–	295 / 600	146 / 600	49 / 600	67 / 600	43 / 600	0 / 600	Hung
26–29 Apr 2018	Mediar	2,660	280 / 600	150 / 600	with AKP	80 / 600	90 / 600	0 / 600	**Hung**
4–14 Feb 2018	PİAR	2,440	275 / 600	145 / 600	0 / 600	95 / 600	85 / 600	0 / 600	**Hung**
2–10 Sep 2017	Objektif	4,322	280 / 600	140 / 600	0 / 600	50 / 600	130 / 600	0 / 600	**Hung**
1 Nov 2015	Snap election	–	317 / 550	134 / 550	40 / 550	59 / 550	—	0 / 550	**84**
7 Jun 2015	Election	–	258 / 550	132 / 550	80 / 550	80 / 550	—	0 / 550	Hung

==== Alliances ====
Date	Pollster	Sample size	Cumhur	Millet	HDP and others	Majority
24 June 2018	Result	–	344 / 600	189 / 600	67 / 600	**88**
14 Jun 2018	Plus Mayak	–	289 / 600	216 / 600	95 / 600	**Hung**
1 May 2018	PİAR	–	270 / 600	230 / 600	100 / 600	**Hung**
