= 36th Republican People's Party Ordinary Convention =

Party election in Turkey

2018 Republican People's Party leadership election
- 3–4 February 2018
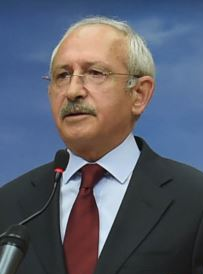

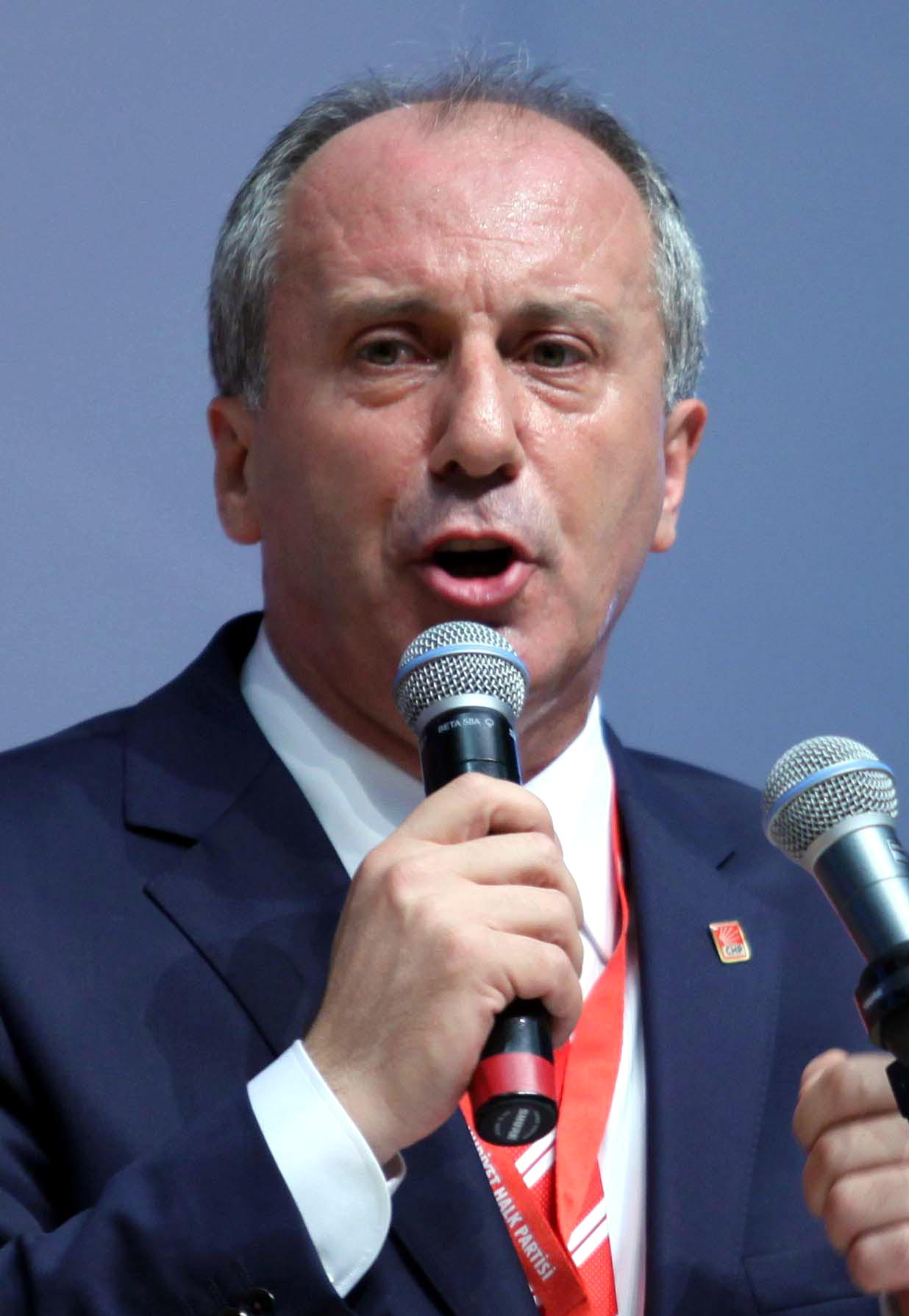
Candidate	Kemal Kılıçdaroğlu	Muharrem İnce
Party	CHP	CHP
Constituency	İzmir (II)	Yalova
Delegate vote	790	447
Percentage	63.9%	36.1%
Leader before election
Kemal Kılıçdaroğlu
CHP
Elected Leader
Kemal Kılıçdaroğlu
CHP

The 36th Republican People's Party Ordinary Convention (Turkish: 36. CHP Olağan Kurultayı) was an election scheduled to take place on 3 and 4 February 2018. During the convention, several high-ranking positions in the Republican People's Party (CHP), the centre-left main opposition party in Turkey, were up for election. The party leadership of Kemal Kılıçdaroğlu, who first won the position in 2010, was challenged by several other party members, notably including former CHP parliamentary group leader Muharrem İnce, and former president of the Istanbul Bar Association, Ümit Kocasakal.

Of the five contenders announcing their candidacy for the leadership, only two, namely Kemal Kılıçdaroğlu and Muharrem İnce, obtained the required 127 signatures from delegates to formally nominate themselves. The run up to the convention saw fierce infighting between the nationalist and left-wing factions of the party, with particular criticism being directed at Kılıçdaroğlu for seeking another term as leader despite losing every national election and referendum since 2010.

The convention was precluded by district and provincial party conventions that elected local party chairmen and delegates for the national convention. Particular criticism was directed at the party leadership for allegedly skewing electoral processes in their favour. 77 provincial leaders later announced their support for Kılıçdaroğlu, with rival contender Muharrem İnce alleging that delegates had either been forced or 'bought off' into supporting the incumbent.

== Leadership election ==
=== Candidates ===
==== Nominated ====
Candidate	Position	Signatures	Percentage
Kemal Kılıçdaroğlu	Incumbent party leader, first elected in 2010	1,085 / 1,266	86.7
Muharrem İnce	Deputy parliamentary group leader of the CHP 2010–2014	166 / 1,266	13.3
Total		1,246	100.0
Number of delegates/turnout		1,266	97.7

==== Declared ====
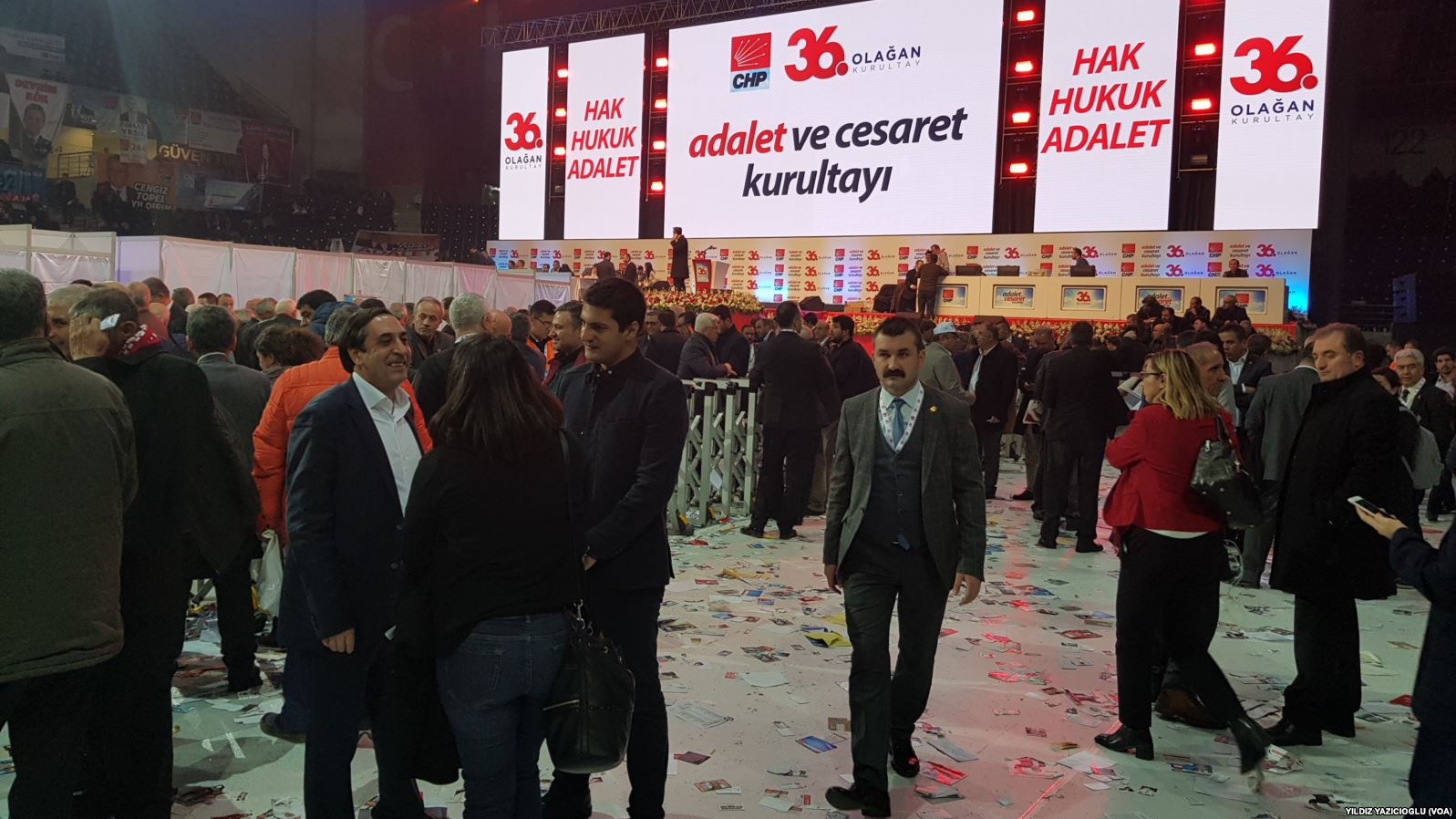
The 36th CHP Ordinary Convention taking place in Ankara

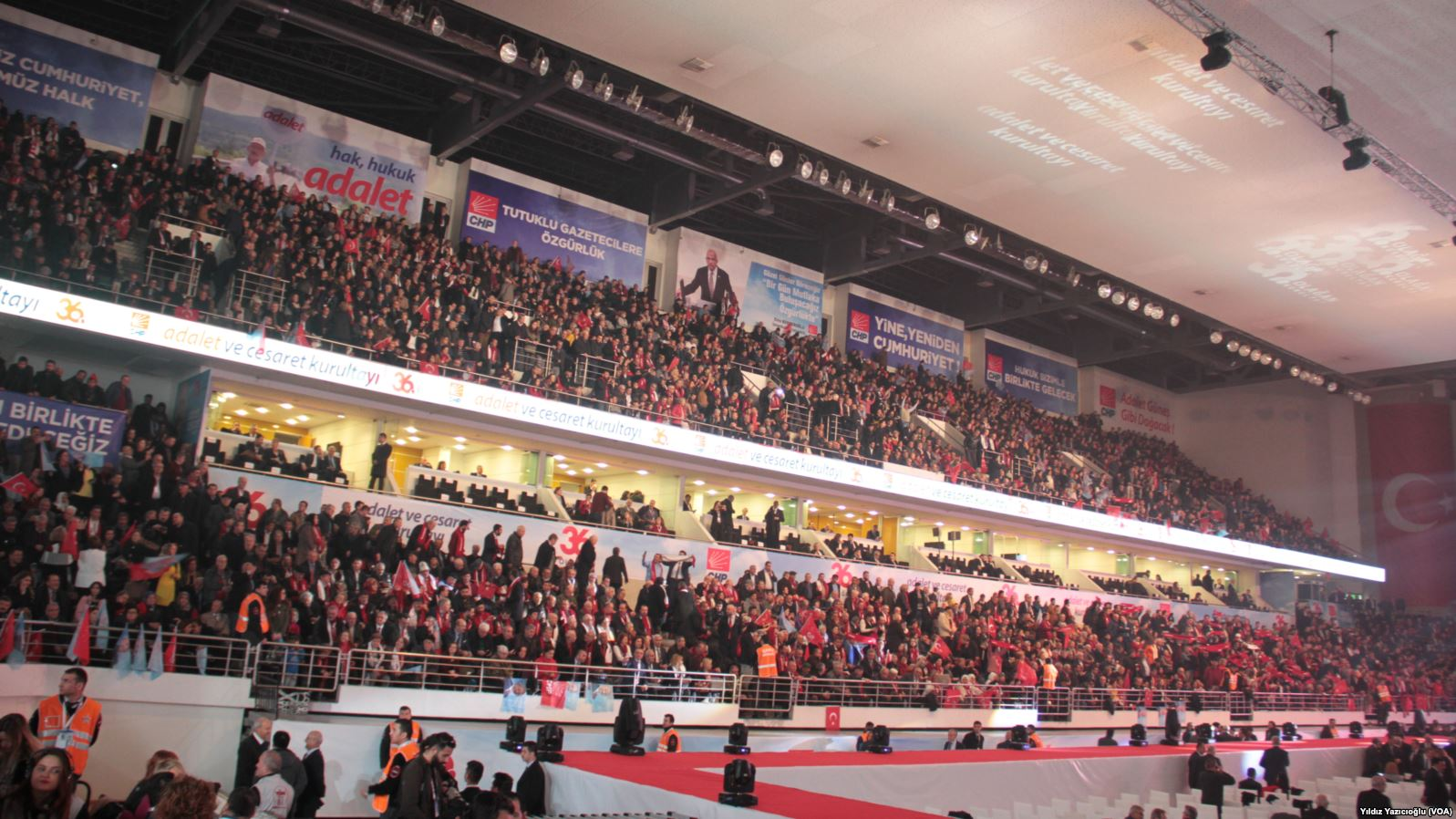
Party members at the convention

The following people announced their candidate for the leadership but failed to collect enough signatures to formally nominate themselves:

- Alparslan Çabuk – former leader of the CHP's Ümraniye local chapter,
- Ömer Faruk Eminağaoğlu – President of the Union of Judges and Prosecutors 2006–2009,
- Ümit Kocasakal – President of the İstanbul Bar Association 2010–2016.

=== Results ===
Candidate	Votes	Percentage
Kemal Kılıçdaroğlu	790	63.9
Muharrem İnce	447	36.1
Valid votes	1,237	98.8
Invalid/blank votes	16	1.2
Total	1,253	100.0
