= Ümit Kocasakal =

Turkish lawyer and academic

Av. Prof. Dr. Ümit Kocasakal
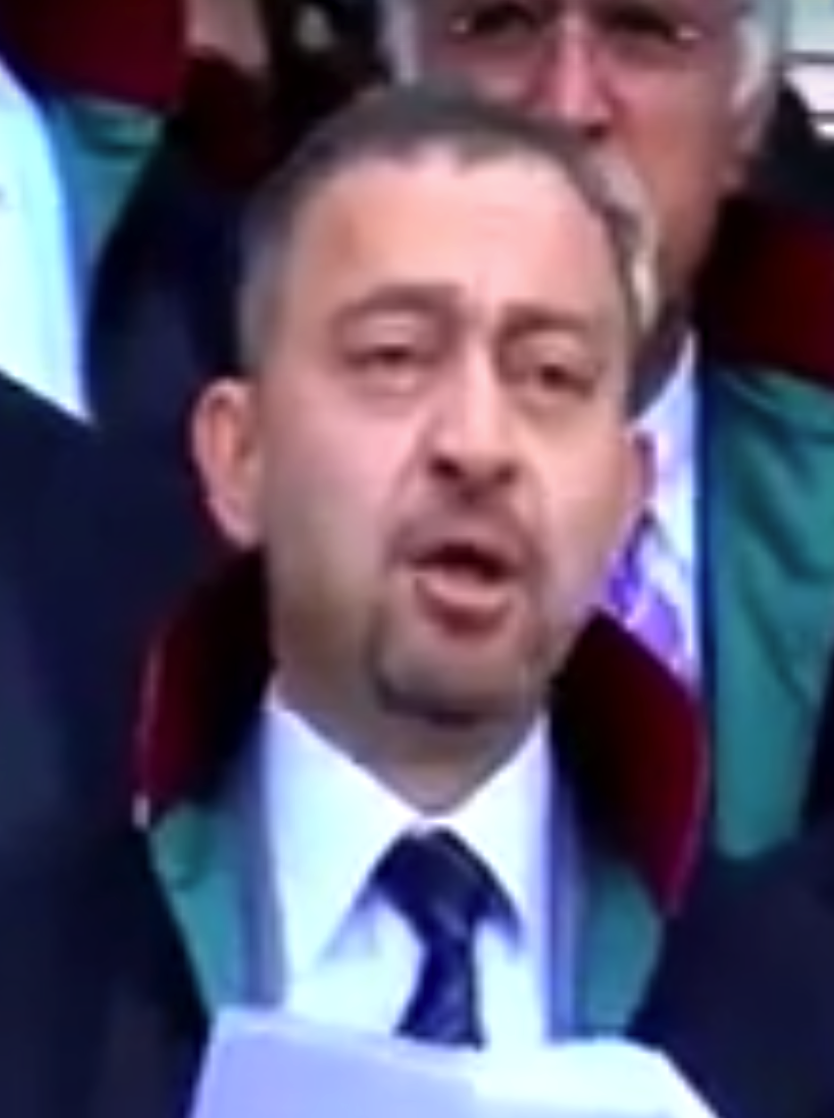

President of the Istanbul Bar Association
- In office 7 November 2010 – 23 October 2016
- Preceded by: Muammer Aydın
- Succeeded by: Mehmet Durakoğlu

Personal details
- Born: 11 May 1966 (age 60) Cologne, Germany
- Education: Law
- Alma mater: Istanbul University
- Occupation: Lawyer

Ümit Kocasakal (born 11 May 1966) is a Turkish lawyer and academic who served as the president of the Istanbul Bar Association between 7 November 2010 and 23 October 2016. He is a Professor, Doctor of law and has been a political commentator critical of the governing Justice and Development Party (AKP) and their alleged encroachments on judicial independence in Turkey.

Having been elected as President of the Bars Association three consecutive times, Kocasakal did not seek a fourth term in 2016, resulting in speculation that he may enter politics from the main opposition Republican People's Party (CHP). He was succeeded by Mehmet Durakoğlu.

== Early life and career ==
Ümit Kocasakal was born on 11 May 1966 in Cologne, Germany. He completed his secondary education at Galatasaray High School in 1986 before graduating from the Istanbul University Faculty of Law in 1990. After a brief career as a freelance lawyer, he joined Galatasaray University in 1995 as a Criminal and Criminal Procedural Law assistant.

In 2000, he obtained a doctorate after completing a thesis on money laundering charges. In 2005, he completed academic work on Principles of Criminal Law in the European Union and became a docent. After working as a lecturer at numerous universities, he became the dean of the Criminal and Criminal Procedure Law Department at the Galatasaray University Law Faculty, a position in which he still serves today. Having authored several articles and papers on legal issues, he also became a lecturer in criminal law at Yeditepe University.

== President of the Istanbul Bar Association ==
On 7 November 2010, Kocasakal was elected as the President of the Istanbul Bar Association. He was elected for a second term on 14 October 2012 and for a third term on 19 October 2014. He did not stand as a candidate in the 23 October 2016 elections, which was won by his endorsement as his successor, Mehmet Durakoğlu. His departure from the presidency raised speculation that he may enter politics, having been seen as a potential CHP leadership candidate on numerous occasions. He continues to serve as a delegate to the Turkish Bars Association.

He was re-elected as the president of the Istanbul Bar Association on 25 October 2026.

== See also ==
- Metin Feyzioğlu
- Kemal Kılıçdaroğlu
