= Sezai Temelli =

Turkish politician (born 1963)

Sezai Temelli MP
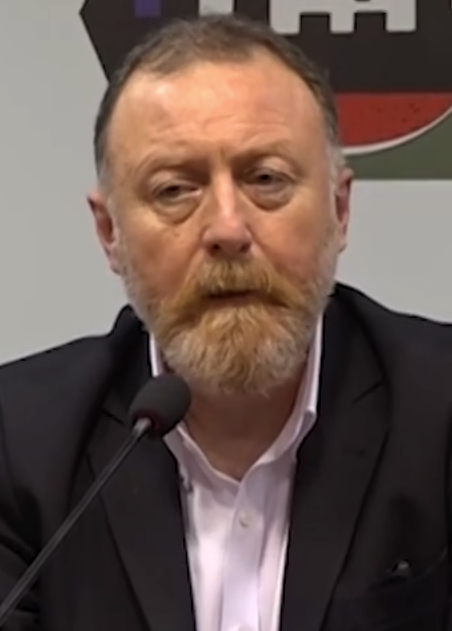

Chairman of the Peoples' Democratic Party
- In office 11 February 2018 – 23 February 2020 Serving with Pervin Buldan
- Preceded by: Selahattin Demirtaş
- Succeeded by: Mithat Sancar

Member of the Grand National Assembly
- Incumbent
- Assumed office 8 July 2018
- Constituency: Van (2018); Muş (2023)
- In office 7 June 2015 – 1 November 2015
- Constituency: Istanbul (II) (June 2015)

Personal details
- Born: 1963 (age 62–63) Istanbul, Turkey
- Party: Peoples' Democratic Party
- Children: 1
- Education: Istanbul University

Sezai Temelli (born 1963) is a Turkish politician, and former chairman of the Peoples' Democratic Party (HDP) in Turkey. He was a Member of Parliament representing Van for the HDP.

== Early life and career ==
Temelli was born in Istanbul and graduated from the branch of finance at the Istanbul University Faculty of Economics. He later completed his PhD there. He later became a lecturer in political science and public policy, specialising in finance. He was dismissed from the university during the purges of 2016.

== Political career ==
Temelli is a founding member of the Peoples' Democratic Party (HDP). Before becoming its chairman, he served as the party's vice chairman responsible for economic policy. During the HDP 3rd ordinary congress held on 11 February 2018, he was elected chairman of the HDP alongside Pervin Buldan, who was elected chairwoman. Both candidates were elected unopposed. In February 2020, he was succeeded by Mithat Sancar.

Temelli was elected as a HDP Member of Parliament for Istanbul's second electoral district in the June 2015 general election. He lost his seat in the snap November 2015 general election. In the 2018 Turkish parliamentary election he was elected again elected to the parliament.

In the 2023 Turkish parliamentary election he was elected in Muş for the Party of Greens and the Left Future.
