= 3rd Peoples' Democratic Party Ordinary Congress =

2018 HDP leadership election
← 2017	11 February 2018
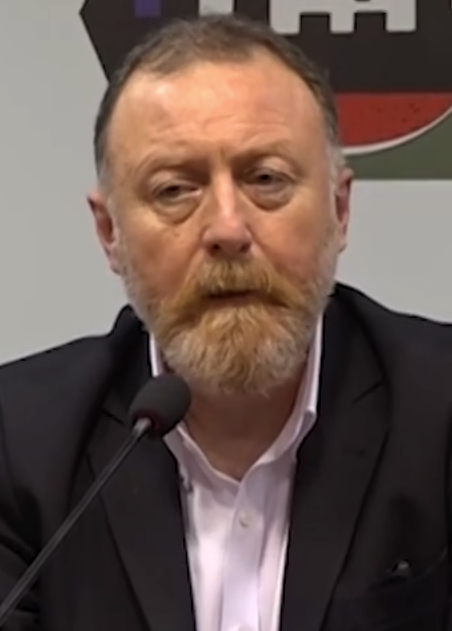

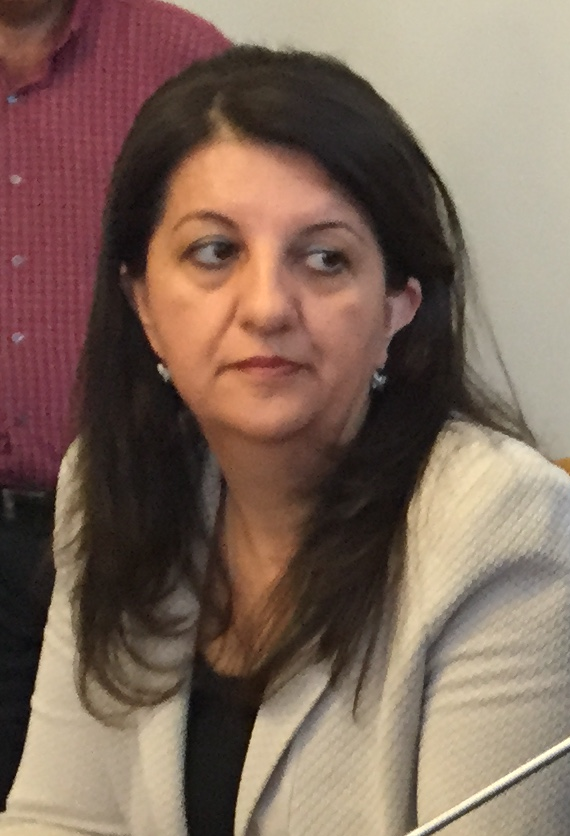
Candidate	Sezai Temelli	Pervin Buldan
Constituency	İstanbul (II)	İstanbul (III)
Position	Chairman	Chairwoman
Popular vote	823	823
Percentage	100.0%	100.0%
Leaders before election
Selahattin Demirtaş (chairman)
Serpil Kemalbay (chairwoman)
Elected Leaders
Sezai Temelli (chairman)
Pervin Buldan (chairwoman)

The 3rd Ordinary Convention of the Peoples' Democratic Party (HDP) was held to elect the leaders and chief party officials of the HDP, a left-wing and pro-Kurdish political party in Turkey. The party employs gender quotas for internal elections, requiring the election of one male co-leader and one female co-leader. Ankara Member of Parliament Sırrı Süreyya Önder was elected as the convention's presiding officer.

Former Member of Parliament Sezai Temelli was nominated for the position of chairman, while serving MP Pervin Buldan, who currently serves as a Deputy Speaker of the Grand National Assembly, was nominated for the position of chairwoman. Both were elected unopposed, taking over from Selahattin Demirtaş and Serpil Kemalbay respectively.

== Leadership election ==
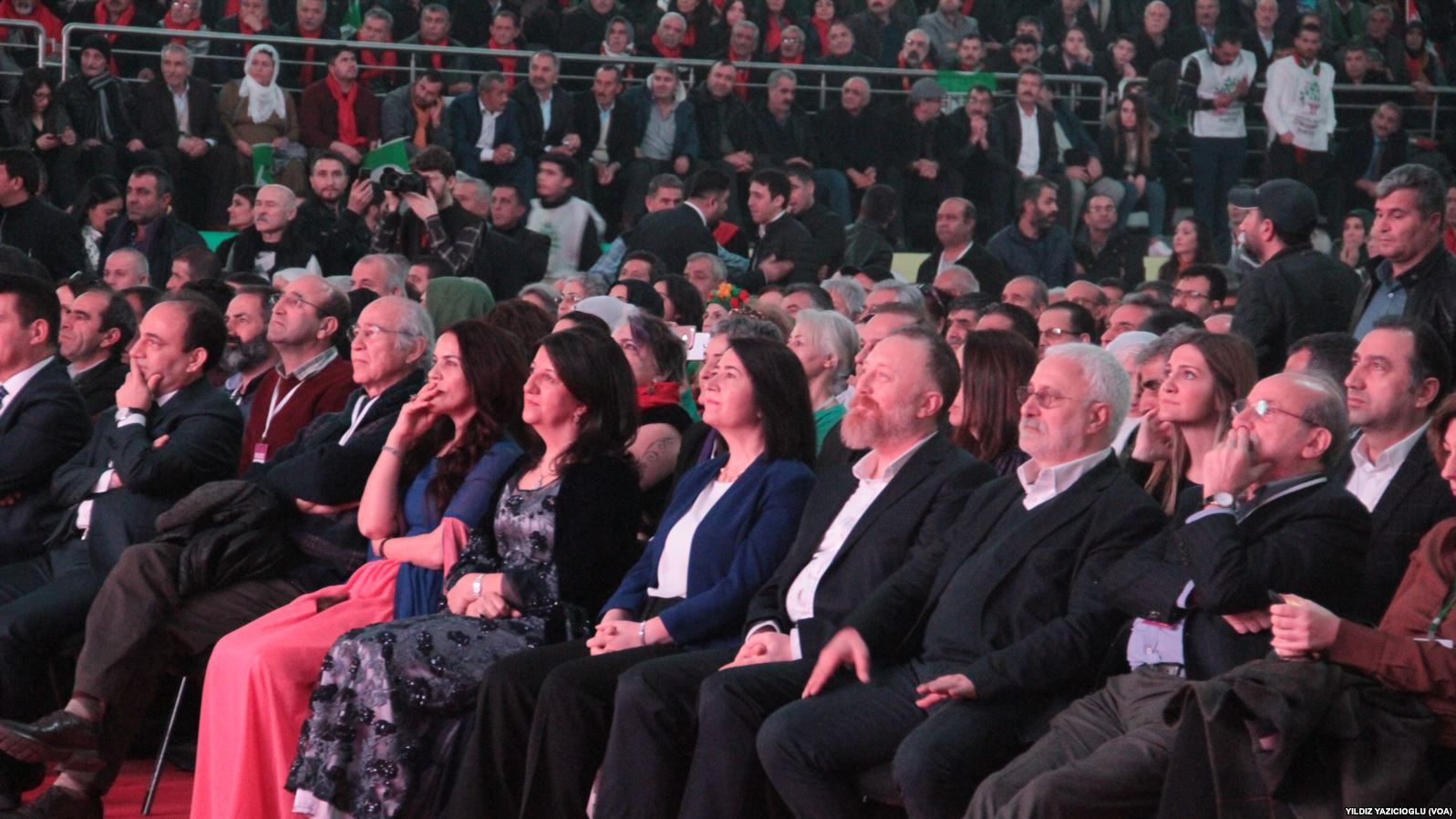
The Congress taking place in Ankara on 11 February 2018

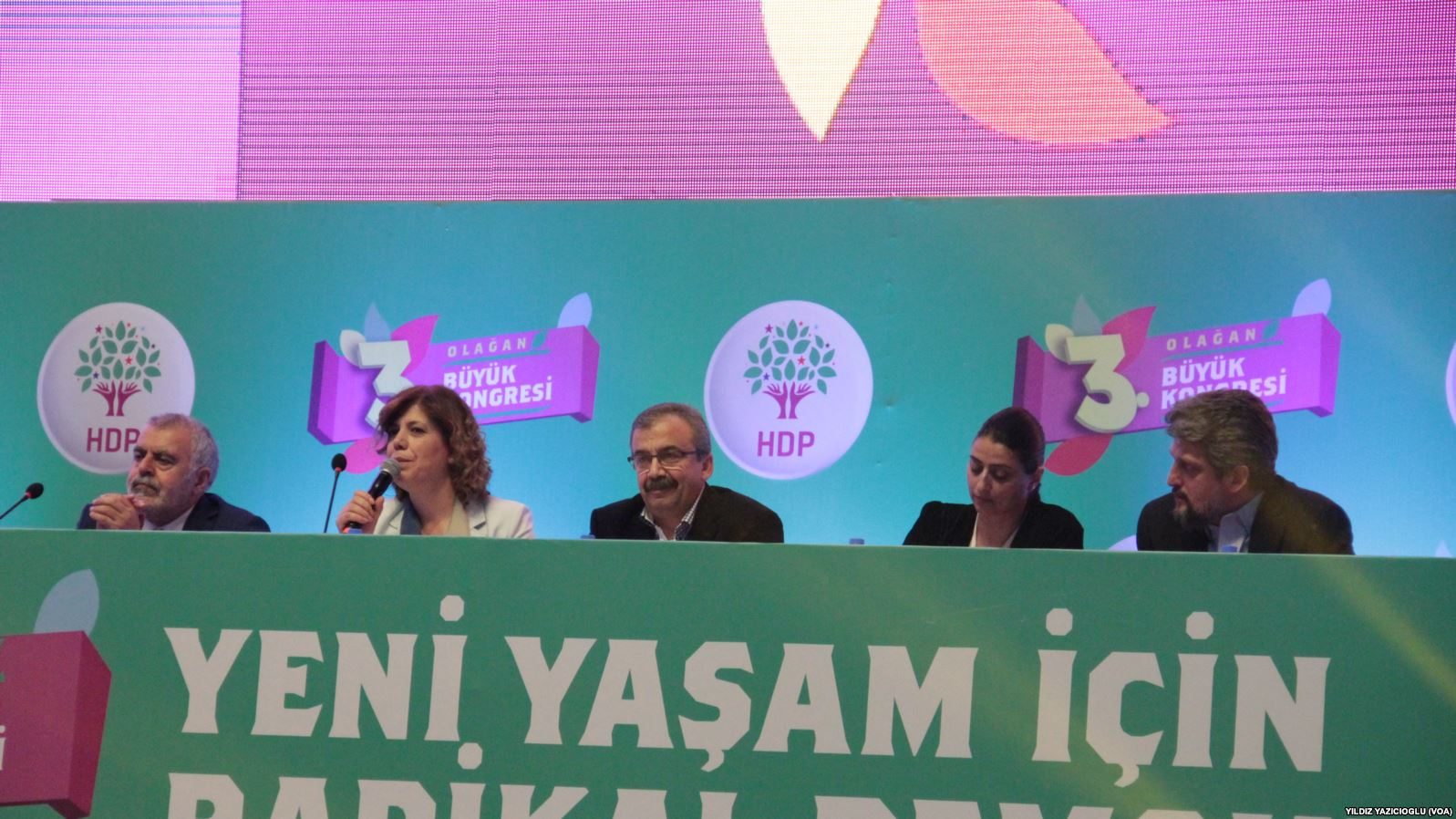
Sırrı Süreyya Önder presiding over the congress

=== Nominated candidates ===
The following candidates were nominated by the party's convention committee and were elected unopposed.

- Sezai Temelli (chairman), former Member of Parliament for İstanbul's second electoral district between June and November 2015.
- Pervin Buldan (chairwoman), serving Member of Parliament for İstanbul's third electoral district and current Deputy Speaker of the Grand National Assembly.

=== Speculated candidates ===
- Selahattin Demirtaş (chairman), serving leader of the HDP imprisoned on terrorism charges, did not stand as a candidate.
- Ahmet Türk (chairman), former leader of the Democratic Society Party (DTP) and former Mayor of Mardin. Declined due to health problems and advanced age.
- Mithat Sancar (chairman), serving Member of Parliament for Mardin.
- Saruhan Oluç (chairman), former Member of Parliament for Antalya and former leader of the Freedom and Solidarity Party, not nominated.
- Ayhan Bilgen (chairman), serving Member of Parliament for Kars, not nominated.
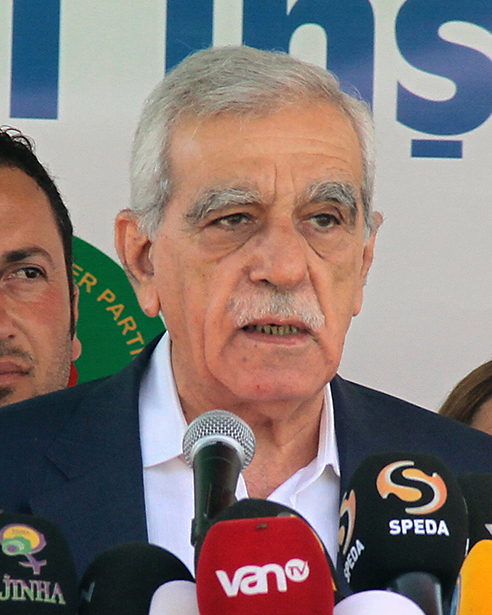
Ahmet Türk (chairman, declined)

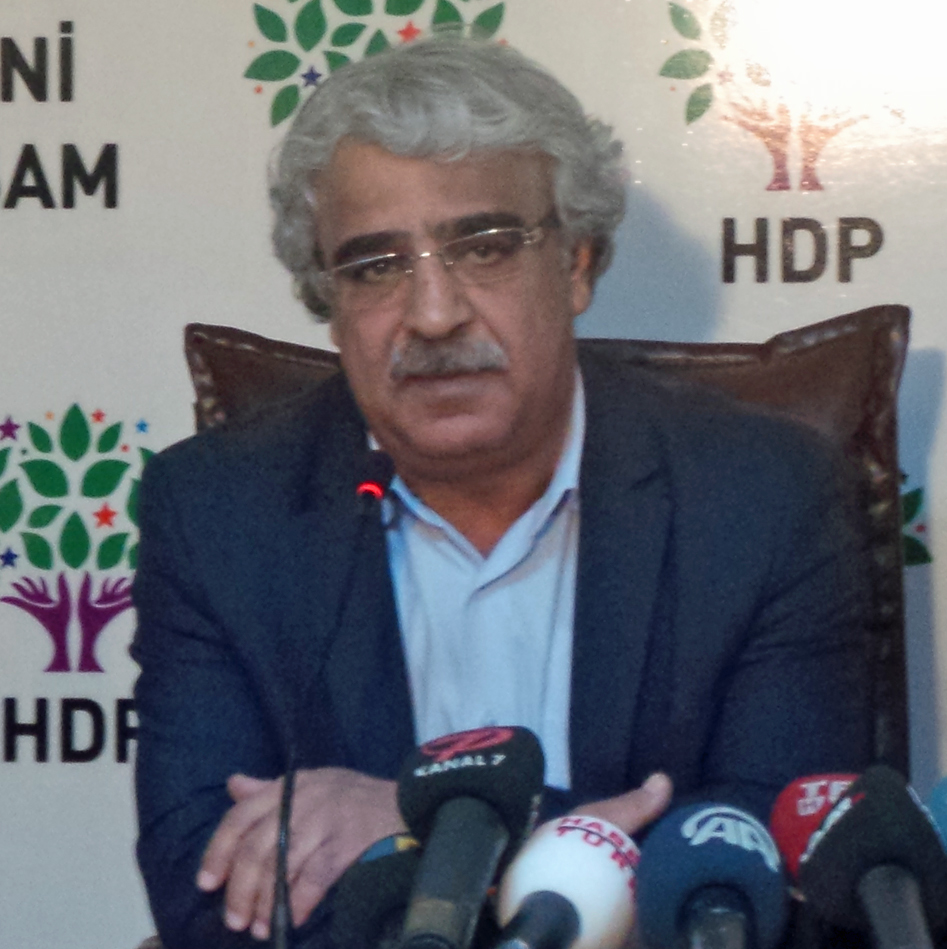
Mithat Sancar (chairman, not nominated)

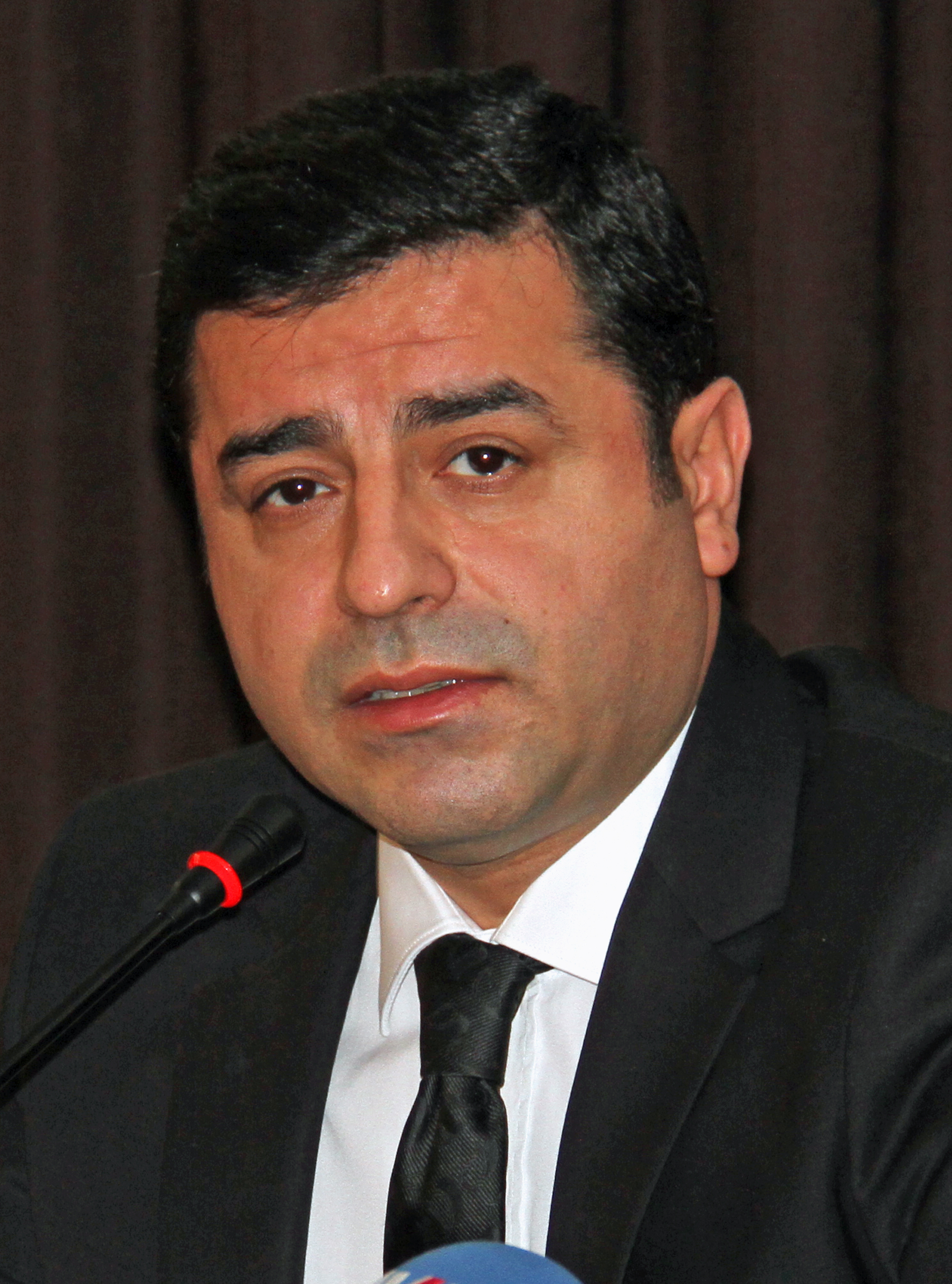
Selahattin Demirtaş (chairman, did not stand)

== See also ==
- Serpil Kemalbay
- Labour Party (Turkey)
