= 3rd Peoples' Democratic Party Extraordinary Congress =

Peoples' Democratic Party leadership election, 2017
← 2016	20 May 2017	2018 →
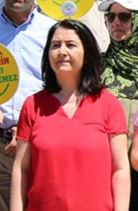
Candidate	Serpil Kemalbay
Party	HDP
Delegate vote	Unopposed
Percentage	100%
Chairwoman before election
Serpil Kemalbay (acting)
Elected Chairwoman
Serpil Kemalbay

The 3rd Peoples' Democratic Party Extraordinary Congress was held on 20 May 2017 to elect a new female co-leader for the Turkish Peoples' Democratic Party (HDP). The party's previous chairwoman, Figen Yüksekdağ, had been imprisoned in November 2016 for inciting violence and distributing terrorist propaganda and had her party membership revoked on 9 March 2017.

On 6 May 2017, the HDP Central Executive Committee met to appoint a new acting leader. Serpil Kemalbay, a serving deputy leader responsible for relations with labour and trade unions, was appointed as acting leader with the support of the HDP Women's Council. She was officially elected unopposed during the congress, and serves as co-leader of the party alongside its male leader, Selahattin Demirtaş.

Only the party's executive and delegates were allowed to enter the congress.

== See also ==
- Kurdish–Turkish conflict (1978–present)
