= Serpil Kemalbay =

Turkish politician

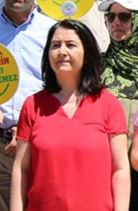

Chairwoman of the Peoples' Democratic Party
- In office 20 May 2017 – 11 February 2018 Serving with Selahattin Demirtaş
- Preceded by: Figen Yüksekdağ
- Succeeded by: Pervin Buldan

Member of the Grand National Assembly
- In office 7 July 2018 – 14 May 2023
- Constituency: İzmir (I) (2018)

Personal details
- Born: Serpil Kemalbay Pekgözegü Ardahan, Turkey
- Party: Peoples' Democratic Party

Serpil Kemalbay Pekgözegü is a Turkish politician and former co-leader of the Peoples' Democratic Party (HDP).

== Early life and education ==
Serpil Kemalbay, whose full name is Serpil Kemalbay Pekgözegü, was born in Ardahan and completed her primary and secondary education there. She first participated in left-wing politics during her first year at secondary school, where she took part in a boycott staged by 'revolutionary struggle' ("devrimci mücadele"). In 1978, she migrated with her family to Istanbul and graduated from Istanbul Technical University Department of Chemical Engineering. After staying in the United Kingdom for a number of years, she returned to Turkey in the early 1990s.

== Political activism ==
Kemalbay was active in the Socialist Solidarity Platform. In 1997, she participated as a founding member of the Solidarity Homes as well as the İMECE Women's Solidarity Association, which later went on to become a trade union. In 2007, she worked to increase the influence of BATİS, the independent textile workers union seeking to unify uninsured workers, in places such as Thrace and Istanbul. She worked as an advisor on workers rights, women workers and safety standards for numerous trade unions. She worked in the medical manufacturing, textile and workers safety sectors before entering active politics.

== Political career ==
Kemalbay joined the Peoples' Democratic Party, a left-wing pro-Kurdish political party in Turkey, and became a parliamentary candidate for Istanbul's first electoral district in the June 2015 general election. Although the party won 80 seats and came joint third in the election, Kemalbay was not elected. She went on to become a member of the HDP Central Executive Committee with responsibilities for labour and trade union relations.

=== Co-leader of the Peoples' Democratic Party ===
In February 2017, the HDP's chairwoman Figen Yüksekdağ was stripped of her membership of the Grand National Assembly and had her party membership legally revoked by the courts. She had been imprisoned alongside the HDP's chairman Selahattin Demirtaş in November 2016 on charges of inciting violence and supporting terrorism, charges that they both deny. Although the HDP declared the decision void and unconstitutional, the revocation of Yüksekdağ's party membership resulted in the chairwomanship falling vacant.

On 6 May, the HDP Central Executive Committee decided to nominate Kemalbay, who had the support of the HDP Women's Council, for the chairwomanship, thereby appointing her acting chairwoman until her position was confirmed by the party's congress. The 3rd extraordinary congress was held on 20 May, where Kemalbay was formally elected unopposed as the party's co-leader.

In the general elections of June 2018, Kemalbay was re-elected as an MP to the Grand National Assembly.

=== Legal prosecution ===
Kemalbay was arrested on February 13, 2018 following the HDP party congress in Ankara on charges of 'spreading terrorist propaganda' during the conference, during which banners of jailed Kurdistan Workers' Party (PKK) leader Abdullah Öcalan were unveiled. Displaying PKK banners is illegal in Turkey. She was released a week later, but still faces charges and is prohibited to leave the country. On the 17 March 2021, the state prosecutor Bekir Şahin demanded for Kemalbay and 686 other HDP politicians a five-year ban to engage in politics together with a closure of the HDP due to the parties alleged organizational unity with the PKK.

== See also ==
- Kurdish–Turkish conflict (1978–present)
