= Istanbul Bar Association =

Turkish Bar Association

- Founded: 1878; 148 years ago
- Type: Bar association
- Headquarters: Istanbul, Turkey
- President: Filiz Saraç
- Website: www.istanbulbarosu.org.tr

The Istanbul Bar Association (Turkish: İstanbul Barosu) is a voluntary bar association based in Istanbul, Turkey. At 60,000 members it is one of the most crowded bar associations in the world. It is a member of the Union of Turkish Bar Associations.

The association has published journals since 1911, and since 1925 publishes the İstanbul Barosu Dergisi ("Journal of İstanbul Bar Association").

In 2013 the president and board of the association were charged with attempting to influence members of the judiciary in the "Sledgehammer" trial, after they had intervened in a 2012 hearing to demand a fair trial. The European Association of Lawyers for Democracy & World Human Rights said their intervention was legal and approved by the presiding judge at the time.

In 2022 Filiz Saraç became the first woman to be elected president of the association.
