= 2018 Turkish general election =

- 24 June 2018
- Presidential election
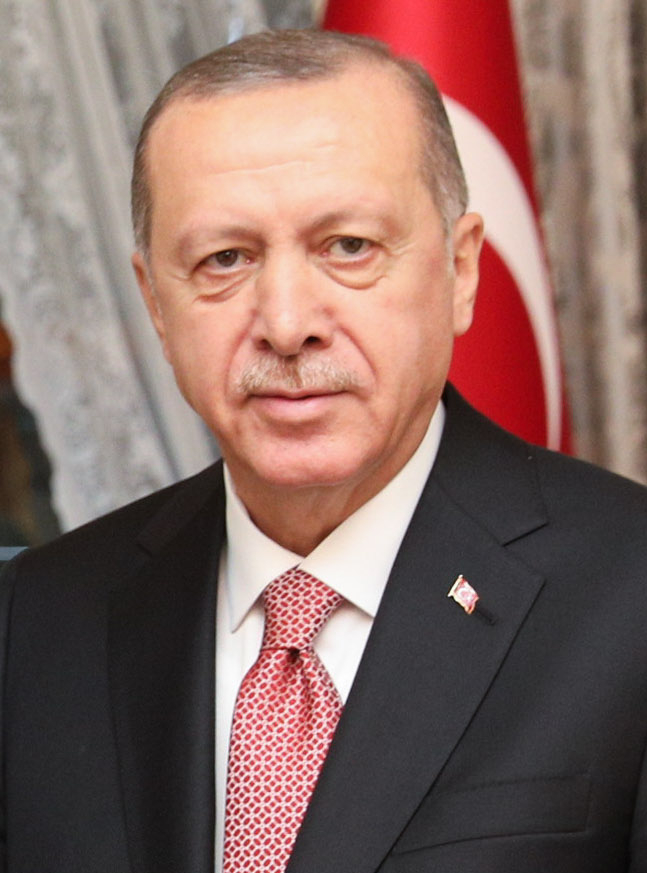

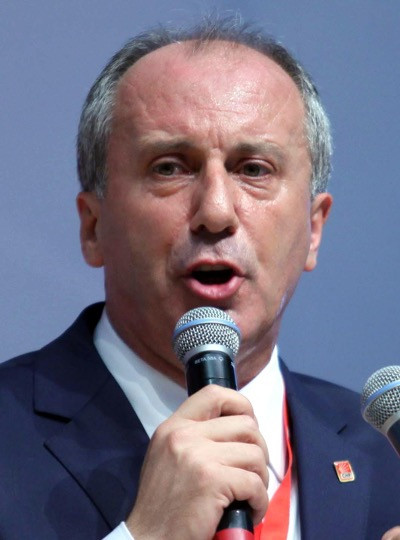

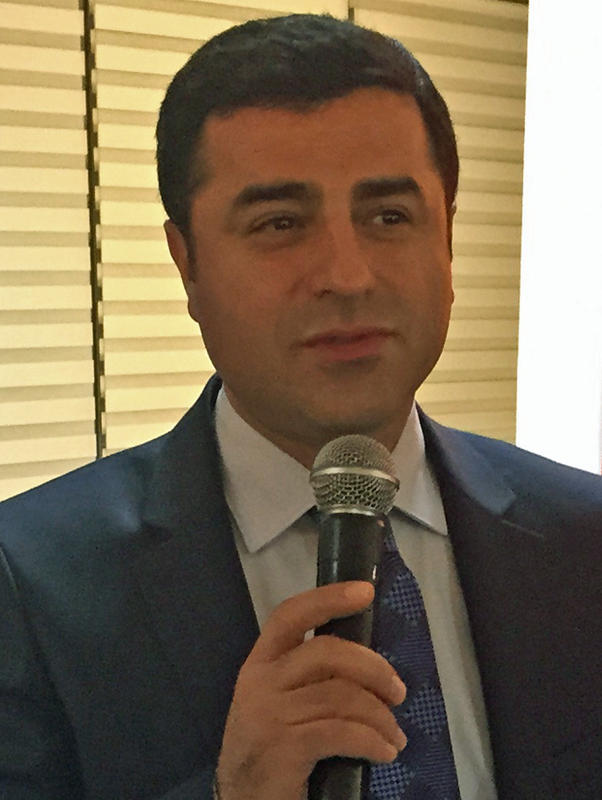

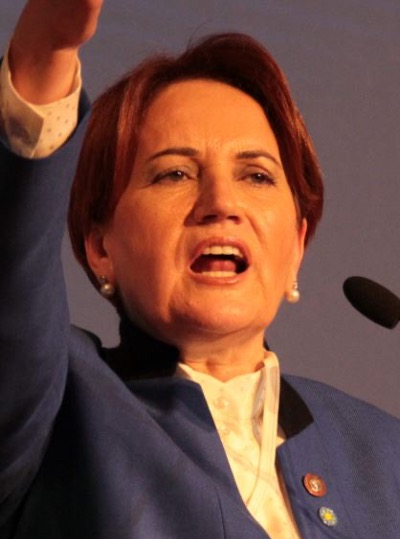
Nominee	Recep Tayyip Erdoğan	Muharrem İnce
Party	AK Party	CHP
Alliance	People	Nation
Popular vote	26,330,823	15,340,321
Percentage	52.59%	30.64%
Nominee	Selahattin Demirtaş	Meral Akşener
Party	HDP	İYİ
Alliance	HDK	Nation
Popular vote	4,205,794	3,649,030
Percentage	8.40%	7.29%
President before election
Recep Tayyip Erdoğan
AK Party
Elected President
Recep Tayyip Erdoğan
AK Party
- Parliamentary election
Party	Leader	Vote %	Seats	+/–
AK Party	Recep Tayyip Erdoğan	42.56	295	−22
CHP	Kemal Kılıçdaroğlu	22.65	146	+12
HDP	Pervin Buldan	10.76	67	+8
MHP	Devlet Bahçeli	11.10	49	+9
İYİ	Meral Akşener	9.96	43	+43
This lists parties that won seats. See the complete results below.

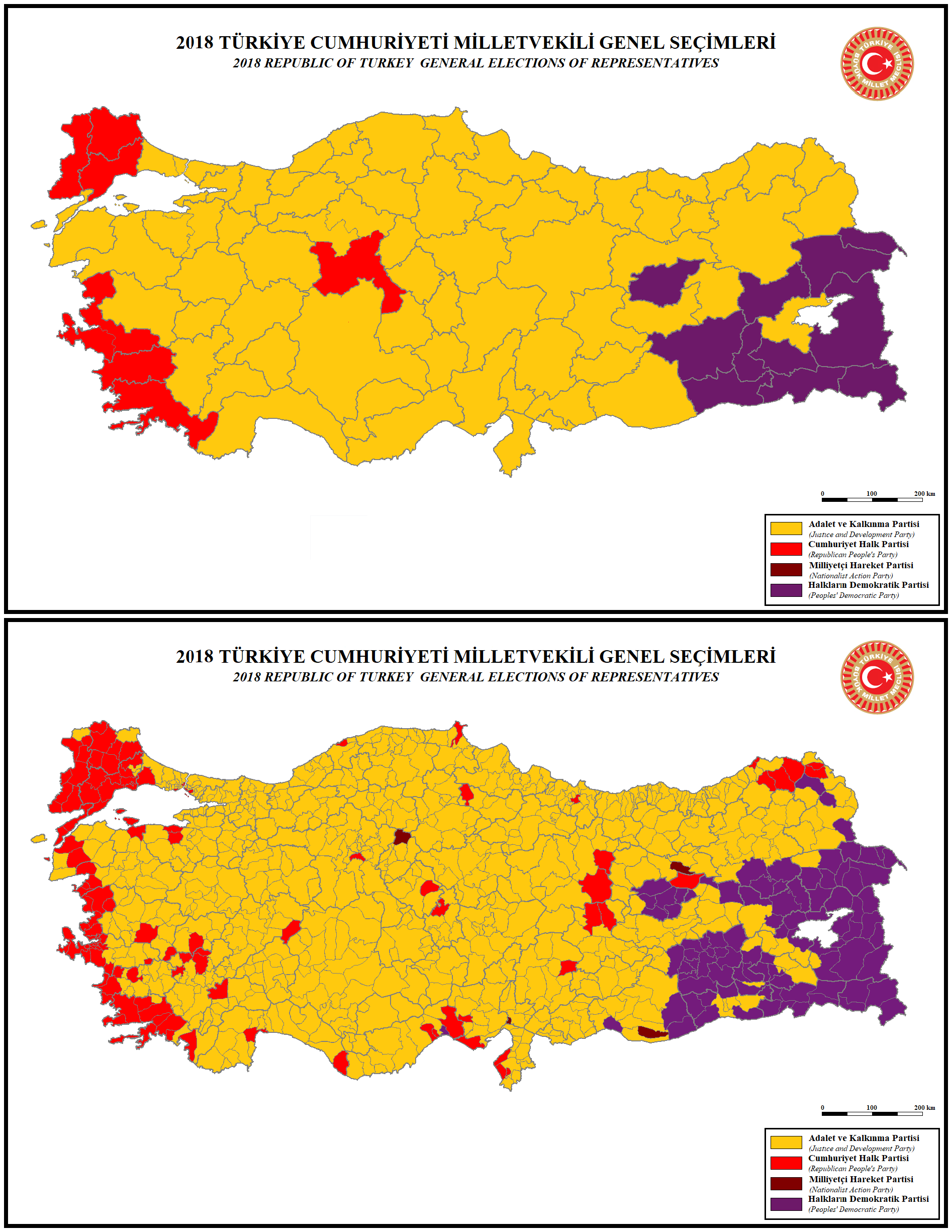

General elections were held in Turkey on 24 June 2018. Presidential elections were held to elect the President of Turkey using a two-round system. Parliamentary elections took place to elect 600 Members of Parliament to the Grand National Assembly of Turkey.

The elections had originally been scheduled for 3 November 2019, until the Erdoğan government called for early elections on 18 April 2018.

== Background ==
=== 2017 constitutional referendum ===
The ruling Justice and Development Party (AK Party) and Erdoğan had long supported a policy of turning Turkey into an executive presidency, replacing the existing parliamentary system of government. With the support of the Nationalist Movement Party (MHP), the government was able to enact a referendum in Parliament, with the vote being set for 16 April 2017.

The proposed constitutional changes would see parliamentary and presidential elections taking place on the same day every five years, with the initial vote being set for 3 November 2019. The number of seats in the Grand National Assembly was to be increased from 550 to 600, although the legislative powers of Parliament would be greatly reduced. Crucially, the office of the President of Turkey would be given powers to rule by decree, becoming both the country's head of state and head of government. Supporters of the changes claimed that the new system would make the system of government more efficient, while critics claimed that it would place too much power in the hands of the president and effectively render parliament powerless.

The constitutional changes were approved by a 51-49% margin, according to official results. However, a last-minute change in the election rules by the Supreme Electoral Council (YSK) during the vote allowed unverified ballots to be accommodated into the count, which the opposition alleges added 1.5 million extra ballot papers. The political opposition decried the move to be illegal and were backed by several overseas observer organisations, which claimed that the vote did not meet international standards. However, subsequent legal challenges were all unsuccessful. Thus, the government began enacting 'compliance laws' to prepare for the new executive presidential system of government, which would be fully implemented following the general election scheduled for 3 November 2019.

=== Early election ===
Despite over two years to go before the next presidential and parliamentary elections, many observers alleged that the government was preparing for an early vote soon after the 2017 referendum. This was, observers claimed, to speed up the implementation of the executive presidential system and also to prevent the popularity of new opposition movements from reducing support for the government. In October 2017, opposition leader Kemal Kılıçdaroğlu called for early elections, although there was no official response to this. Meral Akşener, the leader of the newly formed Good Party, alleged that the government were planning an early vote for Sunday 15 July 2018, the second anniversary of the failed 2016 coup d'état attempt. The party held its first ordinary congress on 10 December 2017 and first extraordinary congress on 1 April 2018 in order to be eligible to contest a possible snap election. Despite months of speculation, the government repeatedly claimed that it was in favour of holding elections when they were due, denying that an early vote would take place.

On 17 April 2018, Devlet Bahçeli, the leader of the Nationalist Movement Party, called for early elections for the 26th of August. Bahçeli had previously announced that they would support a re-election bid of the incumbent president, Recep Tayyip Erdoğan. The Justice and Development Party (AK Party), led by Erdoğan, had recently announced an electoral alliance with the MHP called the People's Alliance. Following his call for early elections, Bahçeli met Erdoğan a day later on 18 April. Erdoğan subsequently announced that his party agreed with Bahçeli that an early election was needed to solve the ongoing 'political and economic uncertainty'. He therefore announced that early elections would take place on 24 June 2018.

== Presidential election ==
=== Candidates ===
Official list of presidential candidates in order of appearance on the ballot paper
1	2	3	4	5	6
Muharrem İnce	Meral Akşener	Recep Tayyip Erdoğan (incumbent)	Selahattin Demirtaş	Temel Karamollaoğlu	Doğu Perinçek
CHP (Nation Alliance)	İYİ (Nation Alliance)	AK Party (People's Alliance)	HDP (No alliance)	Felicity (Nation Alliance)	Patriotic (No alliance)
Campaign	Campaign	Campaign	Campaign	Campaign	Campaign

=== Results ===
Candidate	Party	Votes	%
Recep Tayyip Erdoğan	Justice and Development Party	26,330,823	52.59
Muharrem İnce	Republican People's Party	15,340,321	30.64
Selahattin Demirtaş	Peoples' Democratic Party	4,205,794	8.40
Meral Akşener	Good Party	3,649,030	7.29
Temel Karamollaoğlu	Felicity Party	443,704	0.89
Doğu Perinçek	Patriotic Party	98,955	0.20
Total		50,068,627	100.00
Valid votes		50,068,627	97.79
Invalid/blank votes		1,129,332	2.21
Total votes		51,197,959	100.00
Registered voters/turnout		59,367,469	86.24
Source: YSK

== Parliamentary election ==
=== Parties contesting the election ===
Ballot #	Coalition	Party		Ideology	Leader
1	People's Alliance	AK Parti	Justice and Development Party; Adalet ve Kalkınma Partisi	Conservatism	Recep Tayyip Erdoğan
2	People's Alliance	MHP	Nationalist Movement Party; Milliyetçi Hareket Partisi	Ultranationalism	Devlet Bahçeli
3	None	HÜDAPAR	Free Cause Party; Hür Dava Partisi	Pan-Islamism	Mehmet Yavuz
4	None	VP	Patriotic Party; Vatan Partisi	Scientific socialism	Doğu Perinçek
5	None	HDP	Peoples' Democratic Party; Halkların Demokratik Partisi	Kurdish minority rights	Pervin Buldan; Sezai Temelli
6	Nation Alliance	CHP	Republican People's Party; Cumhuriyet Halk Partisi	Kemalism	Kemal Kılıçdaroğlu
7	Nation Alliance	SP	Felicity Party; Saadet Partisi	Millî Görüş	Temel Karamollaoğlu
8	Nation Alliance	İYİ Parti	Good Party; İyi Parti	Liberal conservatism	Meral Akşener

=== Results ===
Party or alliance		Votes	%	Seats	+/–
People's Alliance	Justice and Development Party	21,338,693	42.56	295	–22
People's Alliance	Nationalist Movement Party	5,565,331	11.10	49	+9
People's Alliance	Total	26,904,024	53.66	344	–13
Nation Alliance	Republican People's Party	11,354,190	22.65	146	+12
Nation Alliance	Good Party	4,993,479	9.96	43	New
Nation Alliance	Felicity Party	672,139	1.34	0	0
Nation Alliance	Total	17,019,808	33.95	189	+55
People's Democratic Party		5,867,302	11.70	67	+8
Free Cause Party		155,539	0.31	0	New
Patriotic Party		114,872	0.23	0	0
Independents		75,630	0.15	0	0
Total		50,137,175	100.00	600	+50
Valid votes		50,137,175	97.94		
Invalid/blank votes		1,052,269	2.06		
Total votes		51,189,444	100.00		
Registered voters/turnout		59,367,469	86.22		
Source: YSK

↓
295	49	146	43	67
AK Party	MHP	CHP	İYİ	HDP

== Controversies ==
The election process was overshadowed many multiple allegations of violations of its integrity. Prominent among them was the allegation of widespread ballot stuffing for the benefit of AK Party and MHP parties in Turkey's east, in particular in Şanlıurfa province.

== See also ==
- 2018 Turkish parliamentary election
- 2018 Turkish presidential election
- Turkish currency and debt crisis, 2018
- Opinion polling for the Turkish general election, 2018
