= 2018 Turkish presidential election =

First re-election of Recep Tayyip Erdoğan

- 24 June 2018
- Opinion polls
- Turnout: 86.24% (▲12.11pp)
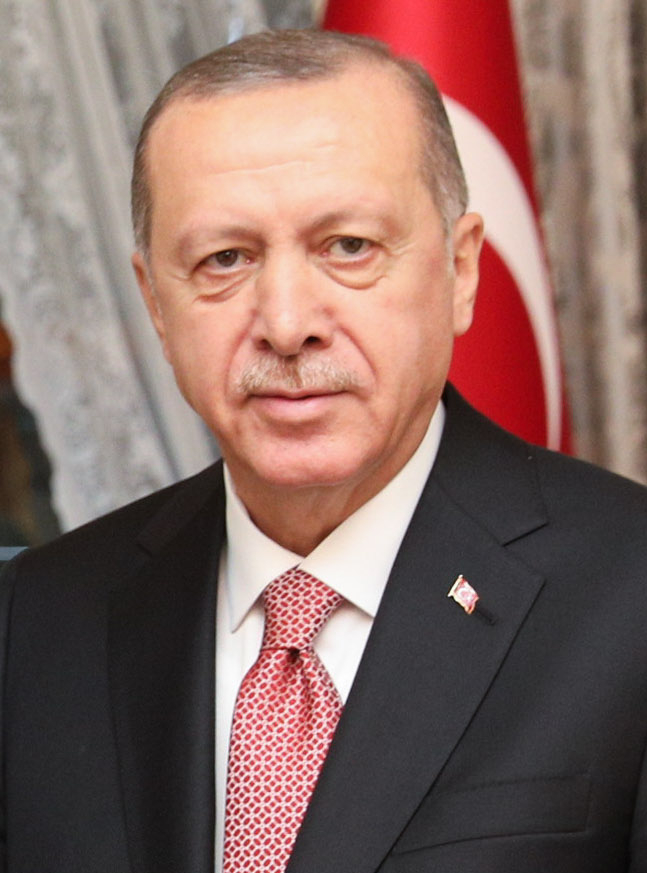

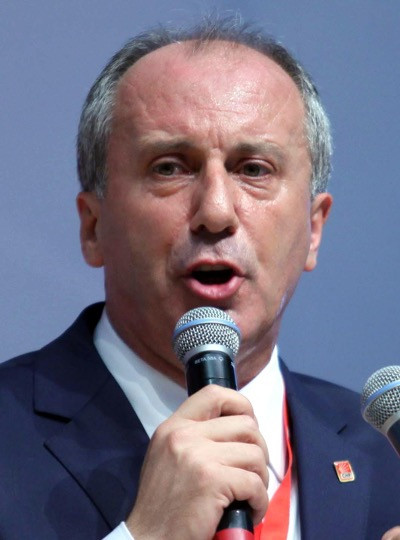

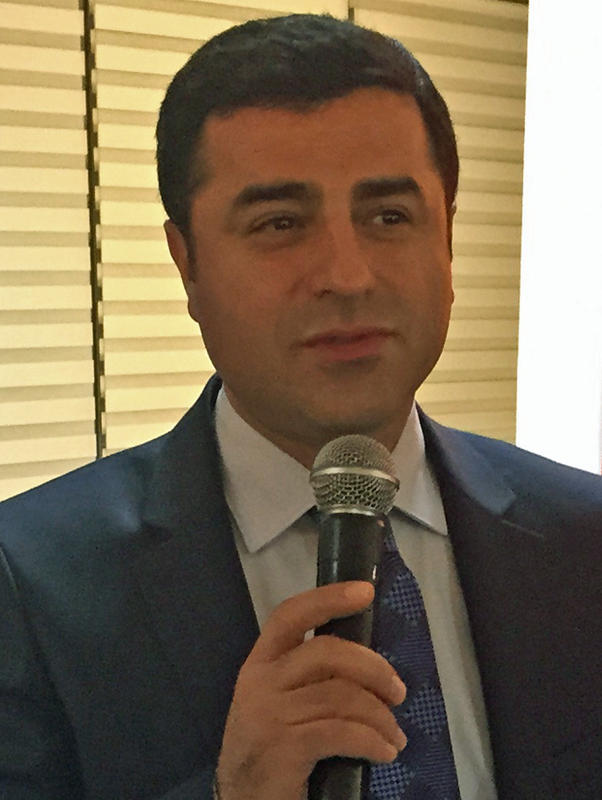

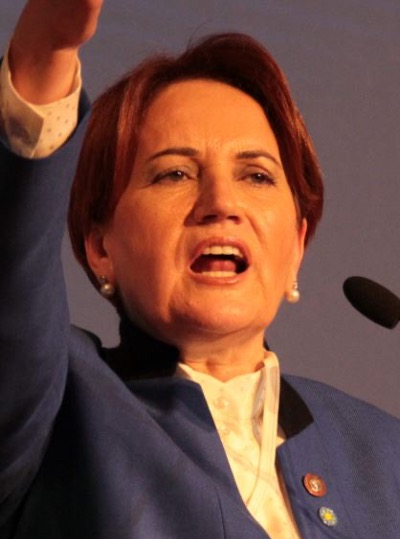
Candidate	Recep Tayyip Erdoğan	Muharrem İnce
Party	AK Party	CHP
Alliance	People	Nation
Popular vote	26,330,823	15,340,321
Percentage	52.59%	30.64%
Candidate	Selahattin Demirtaş (Note: In preventive detention in Edirne since 2016)	Meral Akşener
Party	HDP	İYİ
Alliance	HDK (Note: Supported by the left-wing political parties and groups of the HDK)	Nation
Popular vote	4,205,794	3,649,030
Percentage	8.40%	7.29%
- Results by province
President before election
Recep Tayyip Erdoğan
AK Party
Elected President
Recep Tayyip Erdoğan
AK Party

Presidential elections were held in Turkey on 24 June 2018 as part of the 2018 general election, alongside parliamentary elections on the same day. They were the first presidential elections held after constitutional amendments were approved in a 2017 referendum.

The elections were originally scheduled for November 2019. President Erdoğan and MHP Chairman Bahçeli called for early elections, giving as reason to "not wait any longer" for the entry into force of the 2017 constitutional amendments. Following this, with the 2018 elections, the office of prime minister was abolished and the first government under the presidential system took office.

Incumbent President Erdoğan declared his candidacy for the People's Alliance on 27 April 2018. The main opposition, the Republican People's Party, nominated Muharrem İnce, a member of parliament known for his combative opposition and spirited speeches against Erdoğan. The Peoples' Democratic Party nominated Selahattin Demirtaş, its imprisoned former chairman. Besides these candidates, Meral Akşener, the founder and leader of the İyi Party, Temel Karamollaoğlu, the leader of the Felicity Party, and Doğu Perinçek, the leader of the Patriotic Party, announced their candidacies and collected the 100,000 signatures required to stand.

Campaigning centred mainly on the faltering economy and the currency and debt crisis, with both government and opposition commentators warning of a more serious economic crisis following the elections. The 2018 Gaza border protests, following the United States recognition of Jerusalem as capital of Israel, along with the Turkish military operation in Afrin, also featured in the campaign.

== Electoral system ==
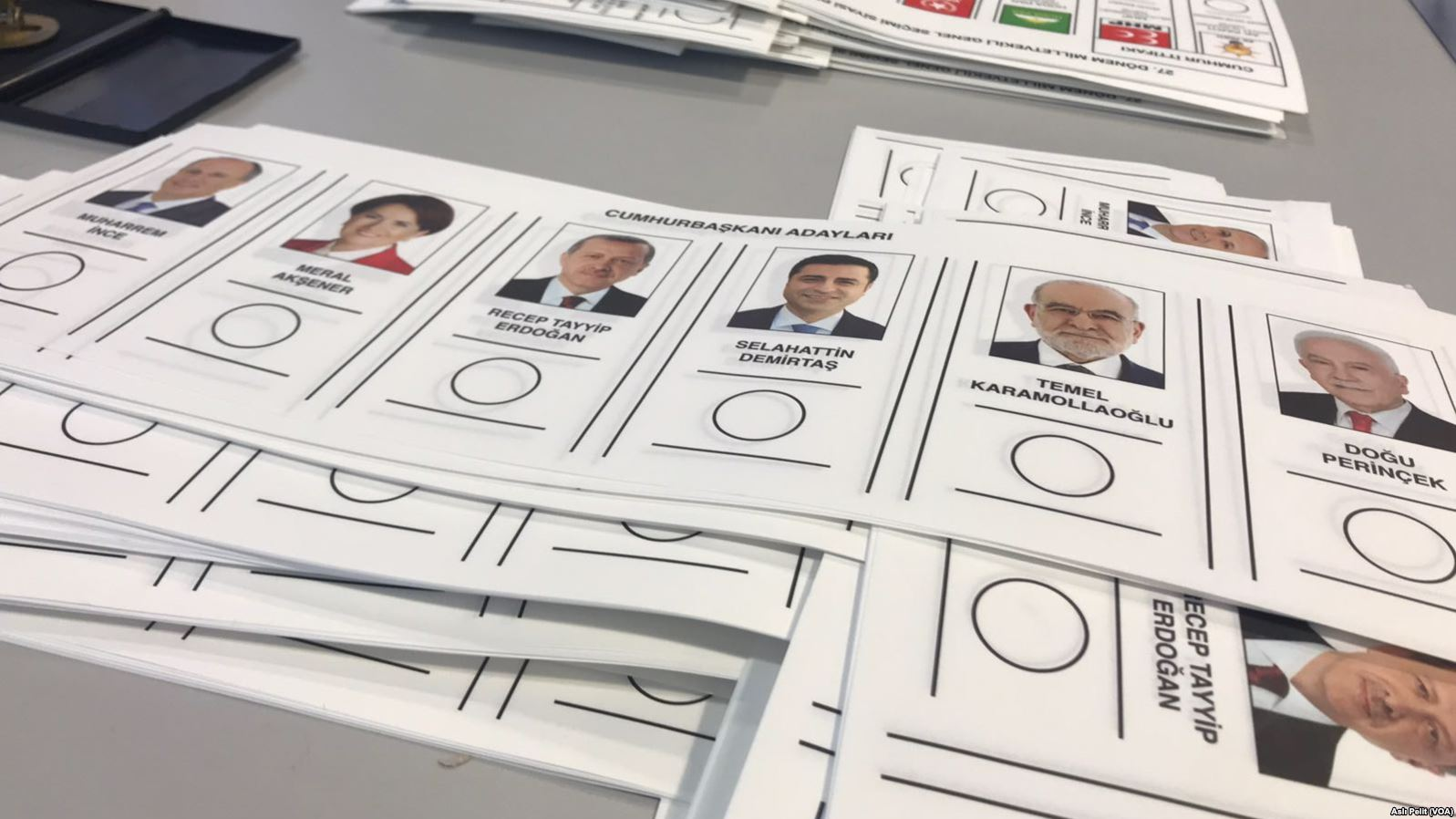
Ballot paper used for the 2018 presidential election

The President of Turkey is directly elected through the two-round system, under which a candidate must obtain at least 50%+1 of the popular vote in order to be elected. If no candidate secures an overall majority outright, then a runoff is held between the two most voted-for candidates from the first round, the winner of which is then declared elected. The first direct election to the Turkish presidency was held in 2014, after a referendum in 2007 abolished the previous system under which the head of state was elected by the legislature, the Grand National Assembly of Turkey. The President of Turkey is subject to term limits, and may serve at most two consecutive five-year terms.

Prospective presidential candidates must be at least 40 years old and must have completed higher education. Any political party that has won 5% of the vote in the previous parliamentary election can put forward a candidate, although parties that have not met this threshold can form alliances and field joint candidates as long as their total vote share exceeds 5%. Independents can run if they collect 100,000 signatures from the electorate. An estimate released in July 2017 predicted that collecting 100,000 signatures to stand for election could exceed ₺15 million (US$4.2 million) in costs, if each individual signature would require certification by a notary. However, the Supreme Electoral Council of Turkey (YSK) announced that signature collection would occur between 4 and 9 May, with voters having to submit their nominations at their local electoral council branch.

Based on the results of the previous general election in November 2015, only the Justice and Development Party (AK Party), Republican People's Party (CHP), Nationalist Movement Party (MHP) and Peoples' Democratic Party (HDP) are eligible to field candidates for the presidential election. The remaining parties combined received under 3% of the vote and are thus unable to field either a joint candidate or a candidate in their own right. In addition to past election results, parties which have a parliamentary group can nominate a candidate. Thus, the newly formed İyi Party was also eligible to nominate their candidate, as 15 CHP members of parliament had defected to them with the intention of allowing the party to form a parliamentary group. However, İyi Party leader and presidential candidate Meral Akşener insisted on being nominated by collecting signatures rather than through parliament.

== Candidates ==
=== Official candidates ===
The Supreme Electoral Council (YSK) formally announced the candidates on 13 May.

Official list of presidential candidates in order they appear on the ballot paper
1	2	3	4	5	6
Muharrem İnce	Meral Akşener	Recep Tayyip Erdoğan	Selahattin Demirtaş	Temel Karamollaoğlu	Doğu Perinçek
CHP (Nation Alliance)	İYİ (Nation Alliance)	AK Party (People's Alliance)	HDP (No alliance)	Felicity (Nation Alliance)	Patriotic (No alliance)
View campaign	View campaign	View campaign	View campaign	View campaign	View campaign

=== Selection process ===
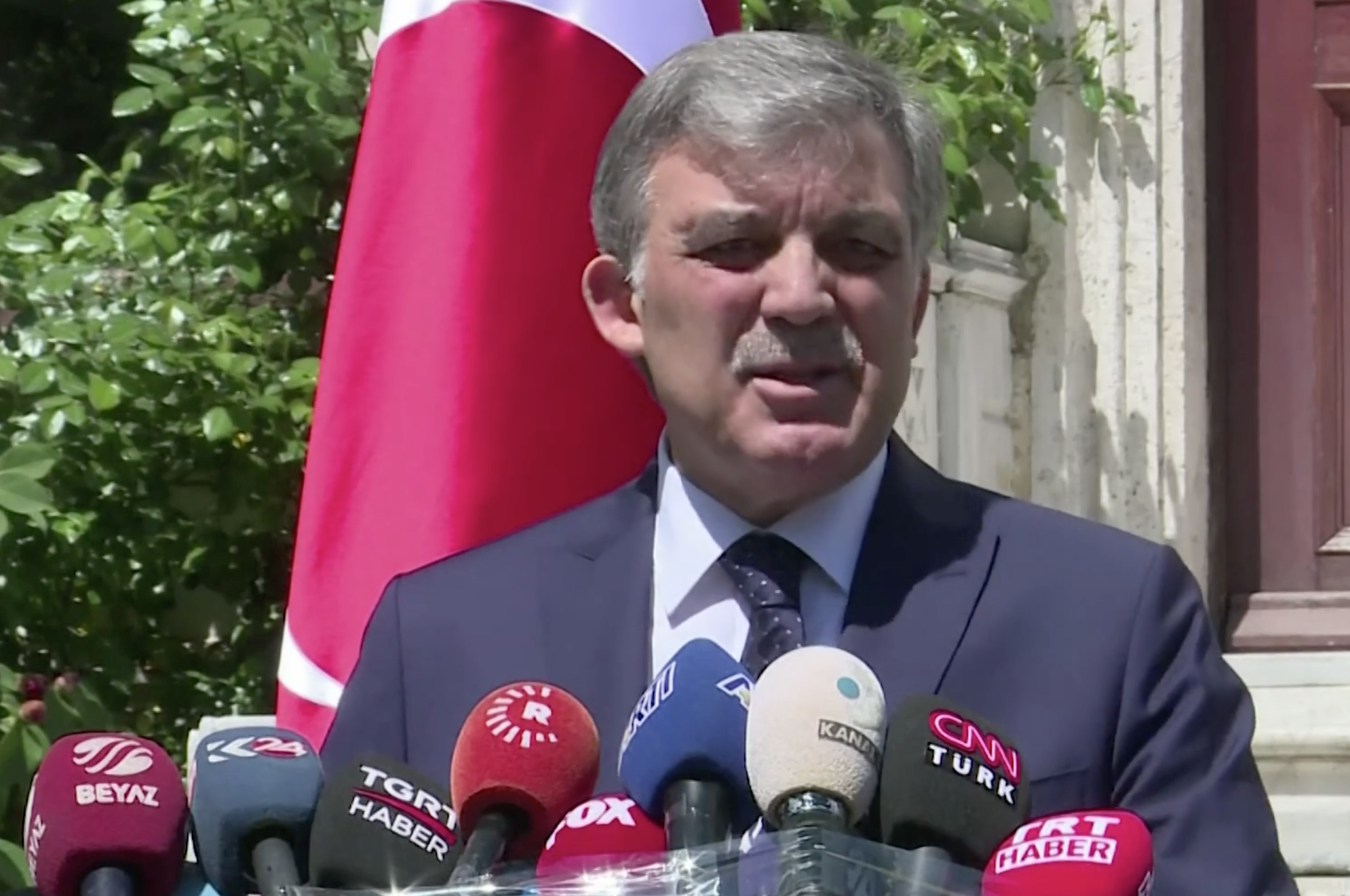
Former President Abdullah Gül announces that he will not stand as a presidential candidate on 28 April

In the run-up to the election, various parties underwent a candidate selection process to nominate presidential candidates.

==== People's Alliance (AK Party and MHP) ====
Serving president Recep Tayyip Erdoğan was widely seen as the undisputed candidate of the People's Alliance, an alliance set up by the governing Justice and Development Party (AK Party) and the far-right Nationalist Movement Party (MHP). This was confirmed by MHP leader Devlet Bahçeli on 21 April 2018. The AK Party parliamentary group voted unanimously to nominate Erdoğan on 3 May.

==== Republican People's Party (CHP) ====
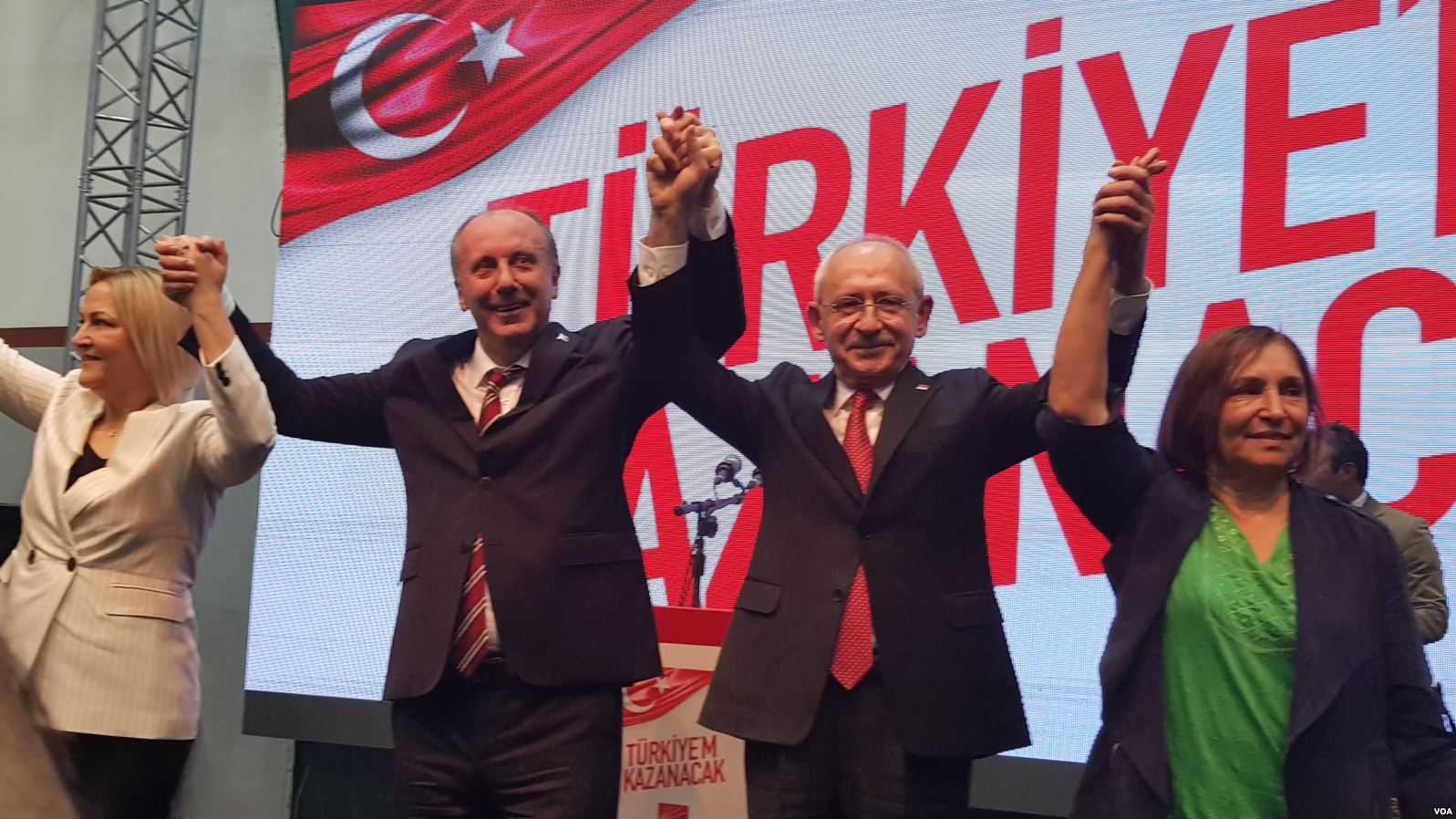
Muharrem İnce being announced as the CHP's presidential candidate on 4 May

The main opposition Republican People's Party (CHP) began a wide search for a candidate, with several rumours that the party was content with supporting a cross-party candidate that was not necessarily in line with the party's values as part of an election alliance. CHP leader Kemal Kılıçdaroğlu subsequently conducted several meetings with the leaders of the Felicity Party and the İyi Party. Former President Abdullah Gül was mentioned as a cross-party option, allegedly receiving the support of senior officials, but was disbanded following heavy opposition from the lower ranks and voters. Gül eventually announced that he would not stand, citing the lack of cross-party consensus. Despite ruling it out several times, party leader Kemal Kılıçdaroğlu was frequently mentioned as a potential candidate, along with Yılmaz Büyükerşen, İlhan Kesici, Muharrem İnce and Mehmet Haberal. Certain MPs, such as Öztürk Yılmaz and Didem Engin also publicly declared their interest. On 26 April, CHP MP Özgür Özel, himself seen as a potential candidate, announced that their nominee would be one who would make the AK Party 'crazy' the most. On 4 May, Yalova MP Muharrem İnce was declared the party's candidate.

==== Peoples' Democratic Party (HDP) ====
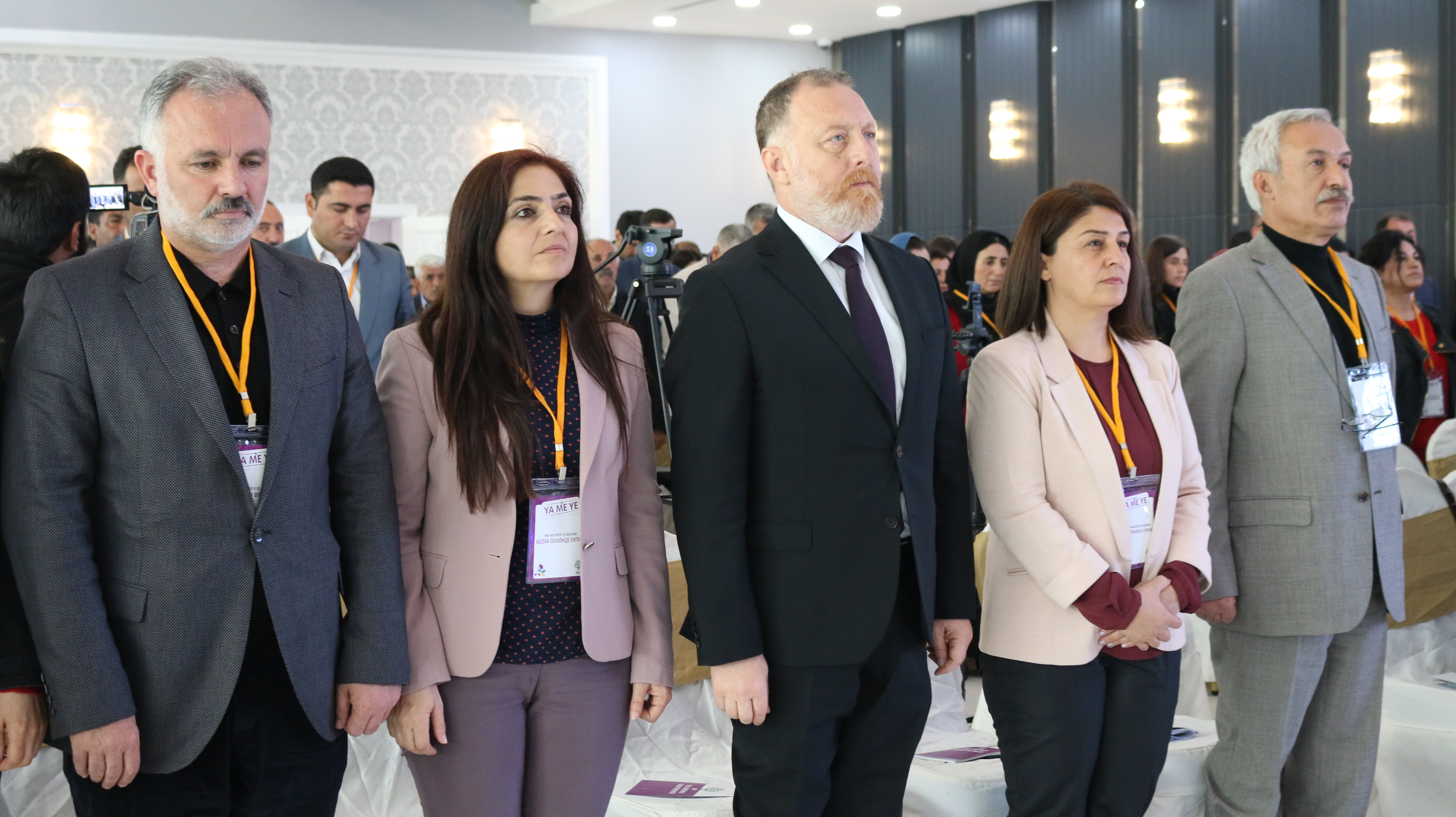
HDP co-leader Sezai Temelli

The HDP nominated Selahattin Demirtaş, their former leader who was also the HDP's candidate in 2014, on 4 May. It was reported that the party executive had broadly agreed on Demirtaş earlier, raising concern that his preventative detention since 2016 could potentially bar him from running. Originally due in court on 11 April, Demirtaş's trial for charges of 'spreading terrorist propaganda' was delayed to 30 April, and then again to 8 June. His candidacy was announced as a part of a 'broad coalition of Kurdish and left-wing parties'. His lawyers and HDP officials claimed that his detention wouldn't affect his candidacy. In his first message after announcing his candidacy, he called on his supporters to be his 'hands and arms' during the campaign.

==== İyi Party ====
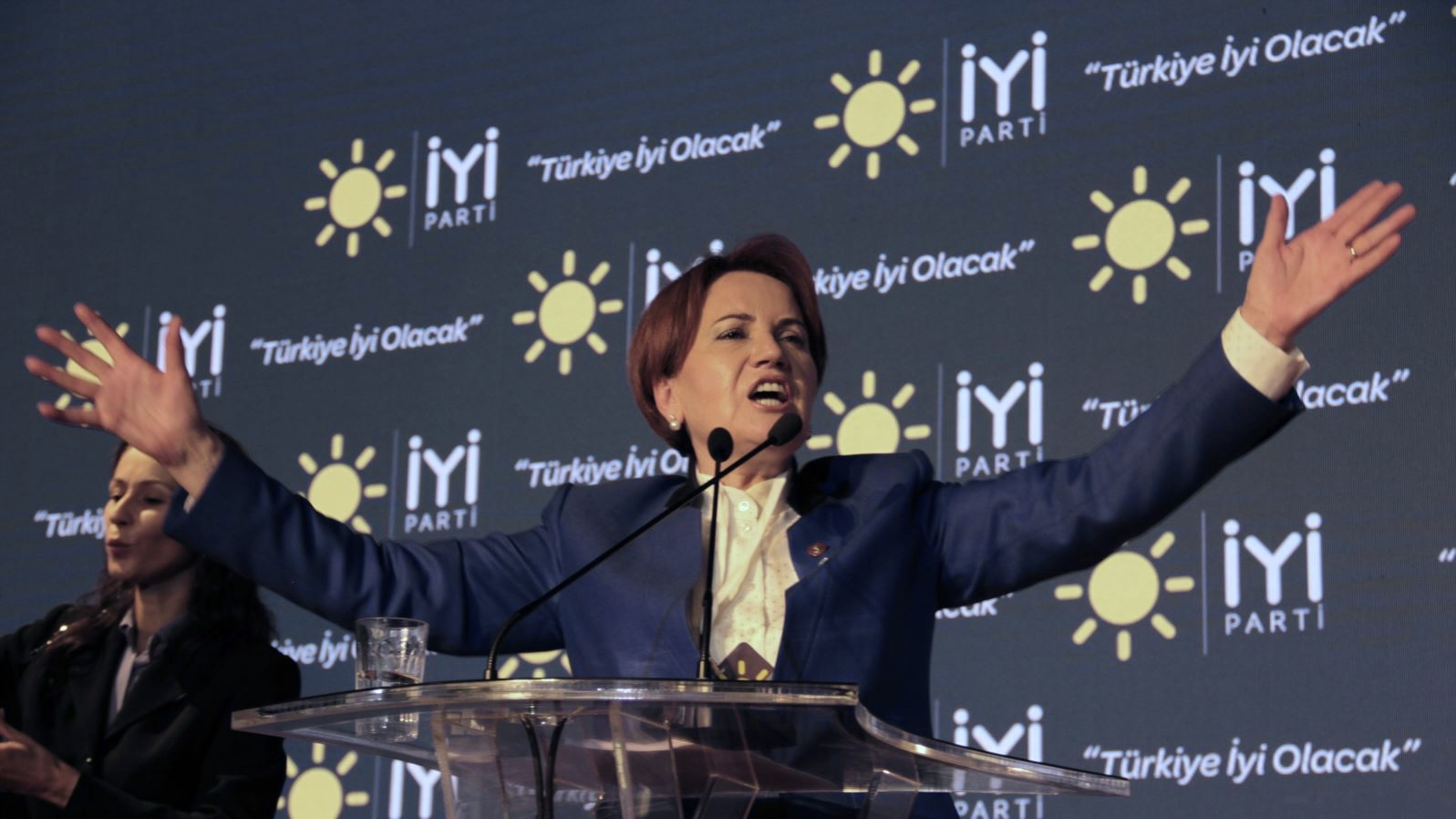
Meral Akşener announcing her presidential ambitions during the establishment of the İyi Party on 25 October 2017

Upon announcing the İyi Party's establishment on 25 October 2017, party leader Meral Akşener announced that she would be a candidate in the presidential election. She reaffirmed her candidacy on 18 April 2018, shortly after the election was called. The party subsequently received pressure from the CHP and the Felicity Party (SP) to enter a joint alliance and support a cross-party candidate, with the SP supporting Abdullah Gül. Akşener refused to withdraw her candidacy, with the party's General Administration Council voting unanimously to nominate her as their party candidate on 24 April 2018.

==== Felicity Party (SP) ====
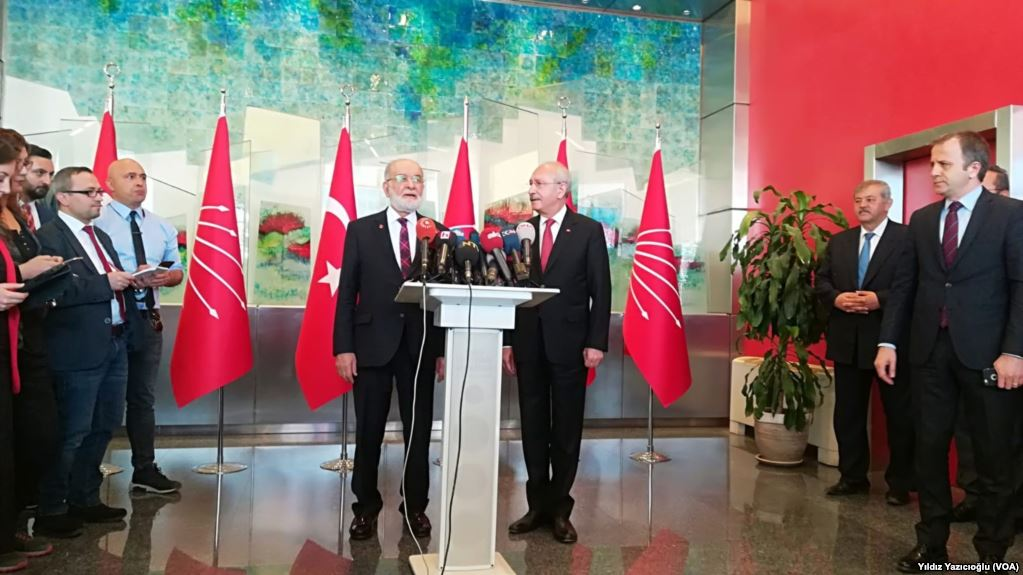
SP leader Temel Karamollaoğlu and CHP leader Kemal Kılıçdaroğlu meet to discuss a joint candidate on 23 April 2018

In the run-up to the election, SP leader Temel Karamollaoğlu managed to carry his party to the mainstream media following a number of speeches where he heavily criticised the government. This led to the SP being regarded as a potential kingmaker in future alliances, causing several larger parties to approach Karamollaoğlu in a bid to field a joint candidate. Although this led to the Nation Alliance being established between the SP, CHP and the İyi Party, no consensus was reached on a joint presidential candidate and each party decided to nominate their own. The SP polled their members on four potential candidates, namely Karamollaoğlu, Abdullah Gül, Haşim Kılıç and Abdüllatif Şener. Karamollaoğlu was announced as the party's candidate on 1 May.

==== Others ====
The left-wing Patriotic Party declared their leader Doğu Perinçek as their candidate. As part of a triple alliance of small centre-right parties consisting of the Motherland Party (ANAP), the True Path Party (DYP) and the Justice Party (AP), the AP's leader Vecdet Öz was nominated as a joint candidate. As independents, journalist Levent Gültekin and Tuna Bekleviç declared their intentions to run.

=== Nominations ===
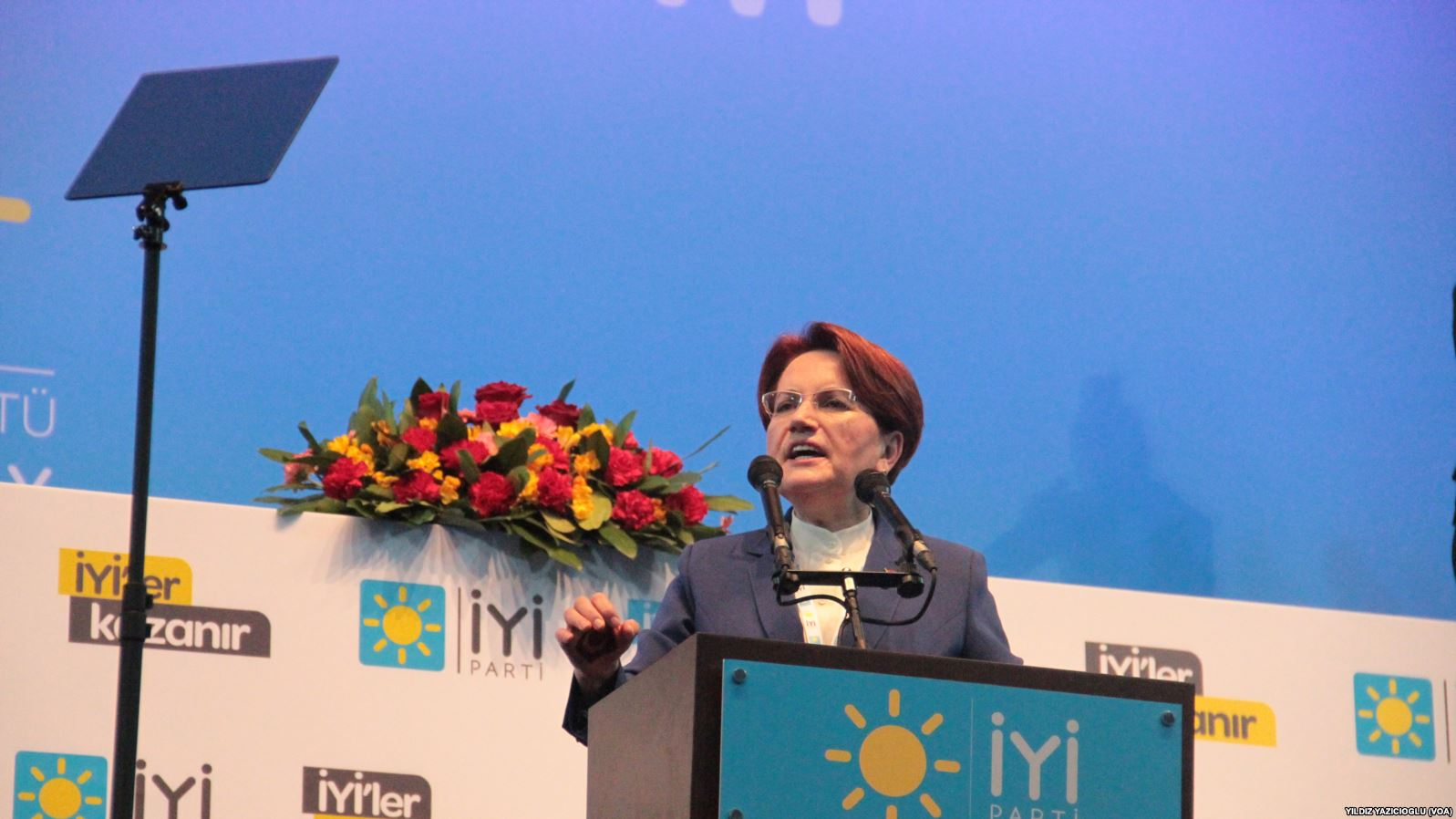
İyi Party candidate Meral Akşener on campaign

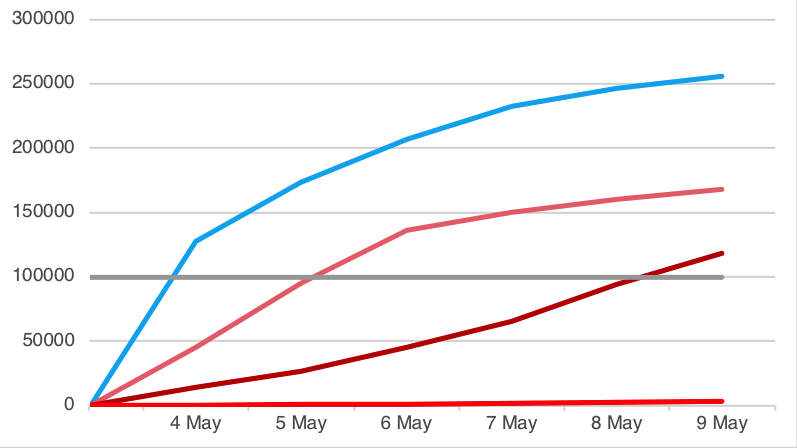
Signatures received by each candidate between 4 and 9 May 2018

The Constitution of Turkey, amended following the 2017 constitutional referendum, allows any party with a parliamentary group (at least 20 MPs) to nominate a presidential candidate. This meant that the AK Party, CHP, HDP, MHP and technically the İyi Party were eligible to automatically nominate candidates through parliament. Meral Akşener, the İyi Party's leader and presidential candidate, opted to be nominated through signatures instead. The MHP, as part of the People's Alliance, did not field a candidate and announced support for the AK Party candidate Recep Tayyip Erdoğan. The CHP formally nominated Muharrem İnce and the HDP nominated Selahattin Demirtaş. The remaining candidates were required to collect at least 100,000 signatures.

Voters were able to give signatures to their preferred presidential candidate between 4 May and 9 May at their local electoral council branch. They were only permitted to nominate one candidate. Seven candidates applied to the YSK to seek nomination by signatures, with three applications being rejected due to insufficient paperwork. As a result, the remaining four successful applicants were as follows.

- Meral Akşener, Leader of the İyi Party
- Temel Karamollaoğlu, Leader of the Felicity Party
- Doğu Perinçek, Leader of the Patriotic Party
- Vecdet Öz, Leader of the Justice Party

Voters abroad were not eligible to give signatures, prompting Perinçek to appeal to the Constitutional Court, arguing that the YSK had violated the rights of Turkish citizens abroad. Overseas citizens were, however, allowed to send a signed declaration by post to their local electoral council in Turkey. Only 72 overseas citizens did so, with 17 signing for Akşener, 18 signing for Karamollaoğlu, 35 signing for Perinçek and no signatures for Öz.

Party	Candidate	Daily signatures						Result
Party	Candidate	4 May	5 May	6 May	7 May	8 May	9 May	Result
İYİ	Meral Akşener	✓ 127,850	173,569	207,142	232,744	246,684	255,582	✓ Nominated
SP	Temel Karamollaoğlu	44,959	95,168	✓ 135,945	150,134	160,680	167,967	✓ Nominated
VATAN	Doğu Perinçek	14,555	26,845	45,026	65,433	93,919	✓ 118,575	✓ Nominated
AP	Vecdet Öz	231	706	1,256	2,015	2,505	3,030	✗ Not nominated
Totals		187,595	296,288	389,369	450,426	503,788	545,154	

== Campaign ==
=== Erdoğan campaign ===
Recep Tayyip Erdoğan, incumbent President of Turkey since 2014, was officially nominated as the presidential candidate of the Justice and Development Party (AK Party) on 3 May 2018. Shortly thereafter, the nominally oppositional Nationalist Movement Party (MHP) reiterated that it would endorse Erdoğan's candidacy, and would jointly apply to the electoral commission for its formal registration. In early May, it was confirmed by Erdoğan that he would be visiting the Bosnian capital of Sarajevo in the early stages of the campaign, most likely on 20 May 2018, and hold campaign rallies with the Bosnian Turks to drum up support for his re-election bid.

=== İnce campaign ===
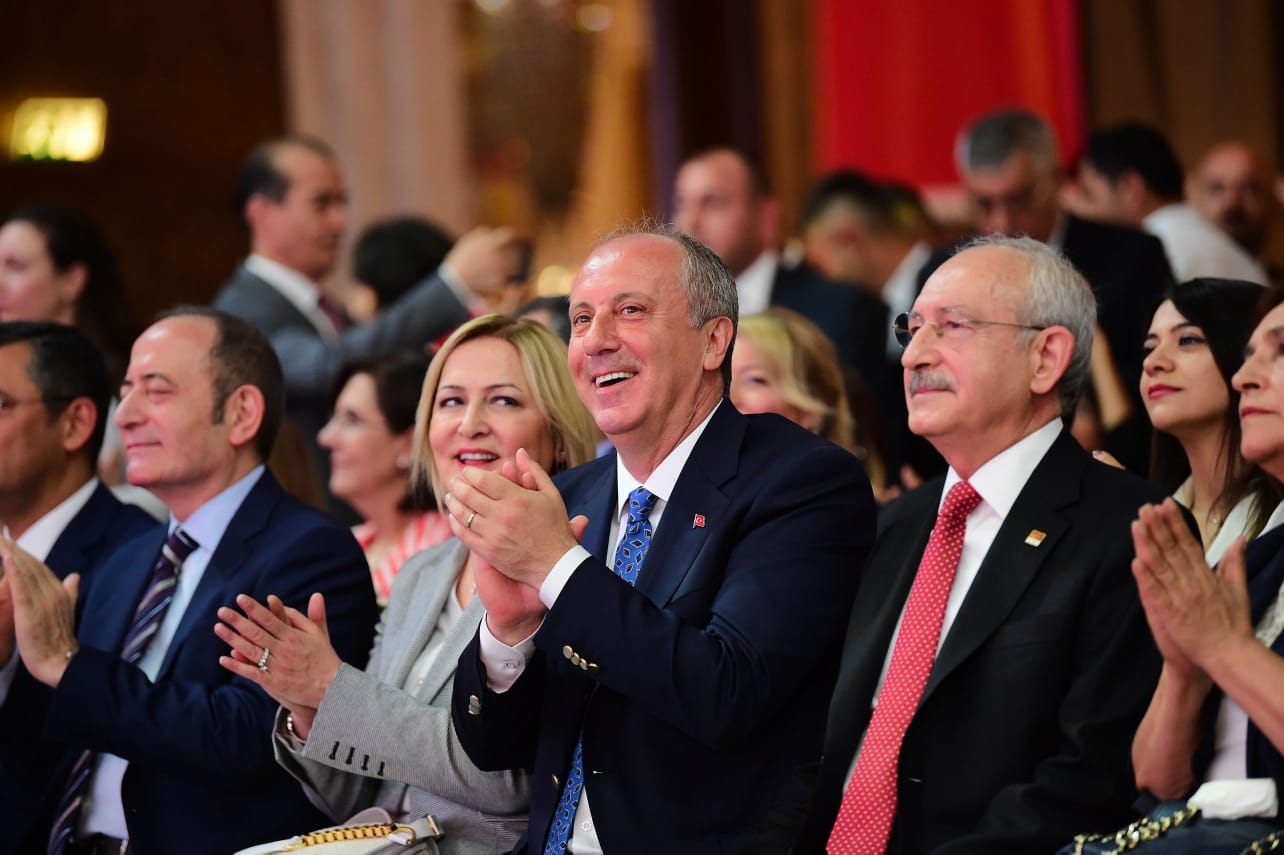
Muharrem İnce at the CHP manifesto launch, 26 May

Muharrem İnce, a member of parliament for Yalova, was announced as the presidential candidate of the Republican People's Party (CHP) on 3 May 2018. On the following day, 4 May, party leader Kemal Kilicdaroglu formally proclaimed the CHP's support for İnce. Shortly thereafter, the CHP began preparations for the campaign season, launching the production of campaign material and merchandise. It was revealed in early May that İnce's campaign would adopt the slogan "Türkiye'ye güvence Muharrem İnce", roughly translating to "Muharrem İnce, an assurance to Turkey", and that it would be kicked off with an election rally in his home city of Yalova on 5 May.

=== Demirtaş campaign ===
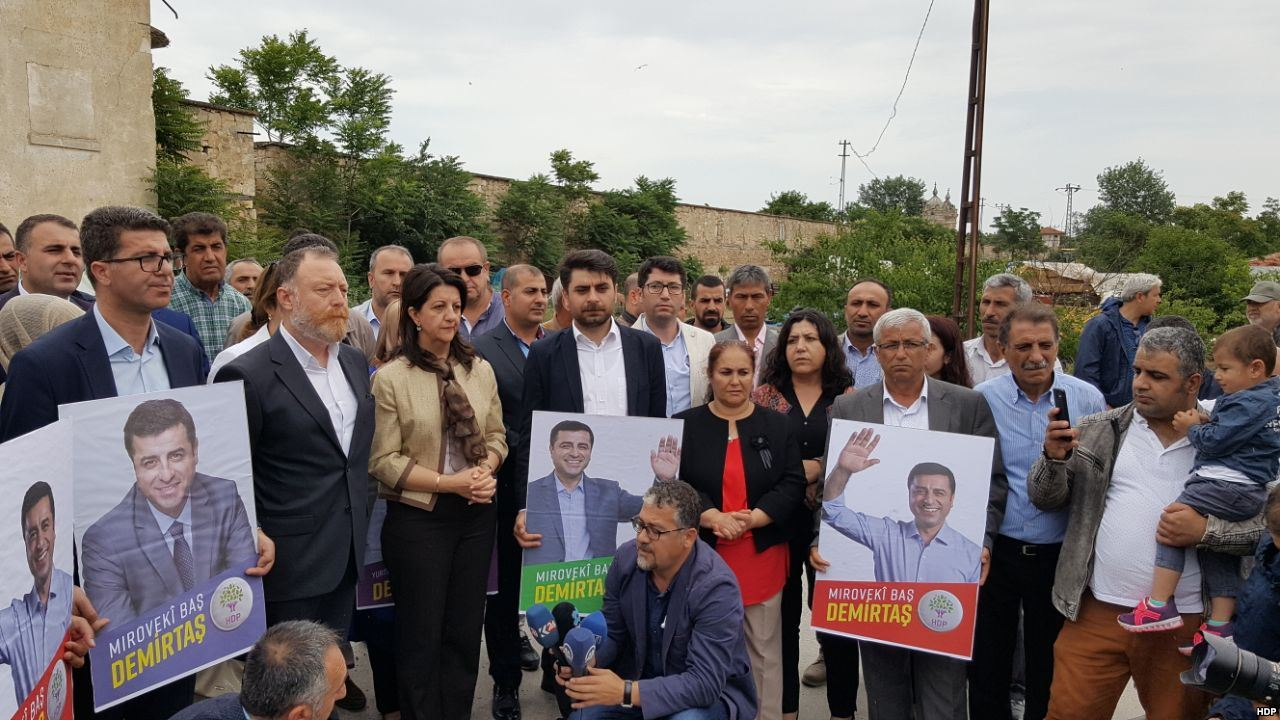
Selahattin Demirtaş's campaign being launched outside Edirne prison where he is incarcerated, 25 May

Selahattin Demirtaş was officially announced as the candidate of the People's Democratic Party (HDP) on 4 May 2018, after members of the party had hinted at his candidacy weeks in advance. Party leader Pervin Buldan declared that Demirtaş, a jailed former co-chair of the HDP, would be leading a five-party "Kurdish alliance" into the general election.

=== Akşener campaign ===
Meral Akşener was nominated as the candidate of the İyi Party on 4 May 2018, after she had successfully collected the 100,000 signatures required for minor party candidates to gain ballot access. Reportedly, she passed this threshold less than four hours after having launched her signature collection campaign.

=== Karamollaoğlu campaign ===
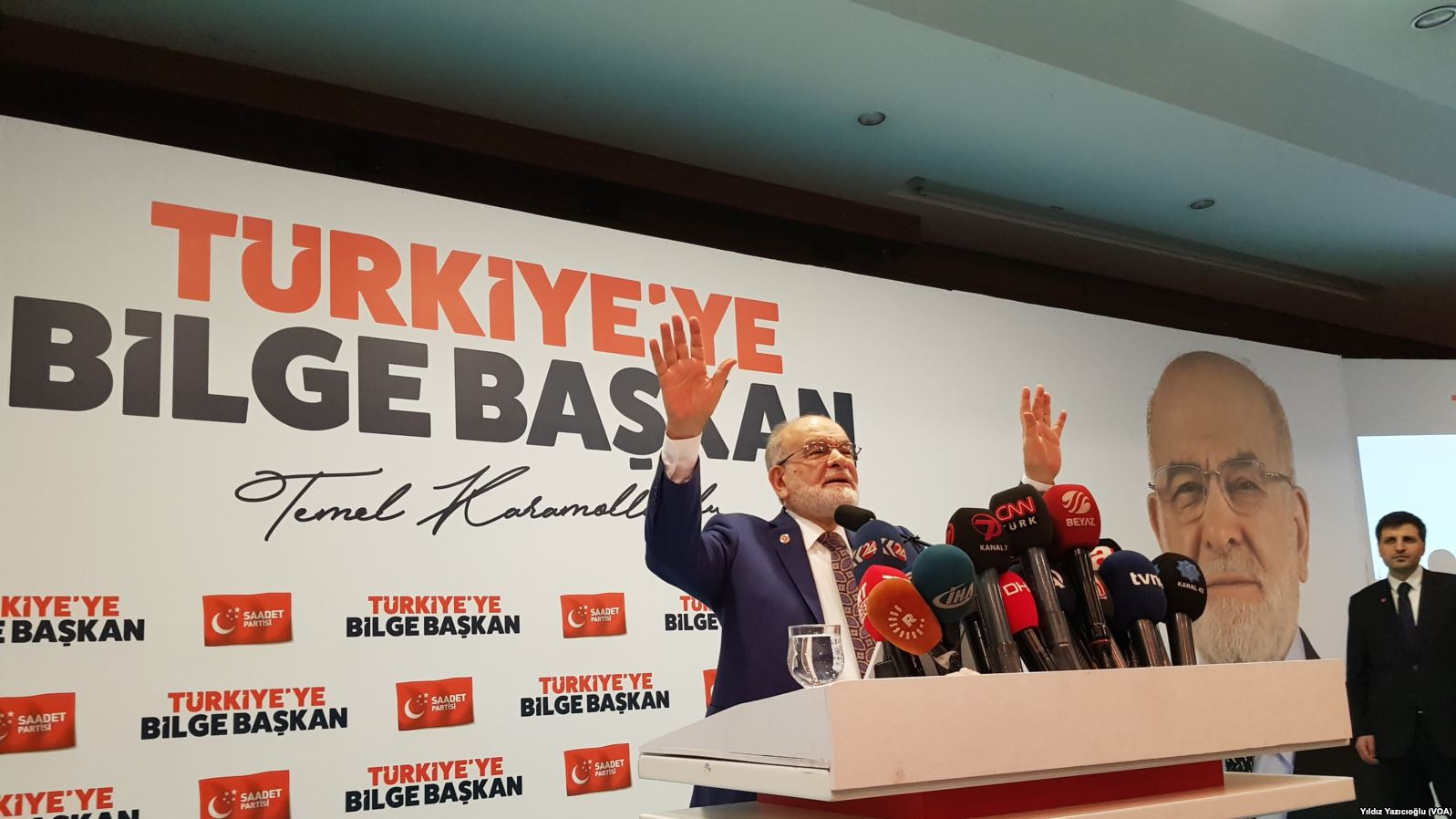
Temel Karamollaoğlu beginning his campaign on 1 May

Temel Karamollaoğlu was nominated as the candidate of the Felicity Party (SP) on 6 May 2018, after he had successfully collected the 100,000 signatures required for minor party candidates to gain ballot access. Karamollaoğlu's campaign adopted the slogan "Türkiye'ye bilge başkan" ("A wise leader for Turkey").

=== Perinçek campaign ===
Doğu Perinçek was nominated as the candidate of the VATAN Party on 9 May 2018, after he had successfully collected the 100,000 signatures required for minor party candidates to gain ballot access.

== Endorsements ==
=== Parties ===
Candidate	Endorsement		Ideology
Erdoğan; AK Party			
Erdoğan; AK Party	MHP	Nationalist Movement Party	Ultranationalism
Erdoğan; AK Party	BBP	Great Unity Party	Sunni Islamism
Erdoğan; AK Party	HÜDAPAR	Free Cause Party	Pan-Islamism
Erdoğan; AK Party	ANAP	Motherland Party	Social conservatism
Erdoğan; AK Party	ASP	AS Party	Militarism
İnce; CHP	YURT-P	Homeland Party	Turkish nationalism
İnce; CHP	TİYAP	Underemployed and Pensioners' Party of Turkey	Social democracy
İnce; CHP	KP	Women's Party	Feminism
İnce; CHP	EYP	Unhindered Life Party	Disability rights
İnce; CHP	BTP	Great Turkey Party	Liberal conservatism
İnce; CHP	MMP	National Struggle Party	Turkish nationalism
İnce; CHP	MHHP	Defense of Rights Movement Party	Kemalism
İnce; CHP	TBP	Unity Party of Turkey	Kemalism
İnce; CHP	TBP	United Turkey Party	Turkish nationalism
İnce; CHP	GAP	Young Anatolia Party	National conservatism
İnce; CHP	AVATAN	Motherland Party	Liberal conservatism
Demirtaş; HDP	DBP	Democratic Regions Party	Democratic confederalism
Demirtaş; HDP	ÖDP	Freedom and Solidarity Party	Socialism
Demirtaş; HDP	TİP	Workers' Party of Turkey	Communism
Demirtaş; HDP	ÖSP	Freedom and Socialism Party	Democratic socialism
Demirtaş; HDP	EMEP	Labour Party	Hoxhaism
Demirtaş; HDP	PSK	Kurdistan Socialist Party	Left-wing nationalism
Demirtaş; HDP	PAK	Kurdistan Freedom Party	Conservative liberalism
Demirtaş; HDP	KDP-T	Kurdistan Democratic Party/North	Kurdish nationalism
Demirtaş; HDP	ESP	Socialist Party of the Oppressed	Anti-revisionism
Demirtaş; HDP	EHP	Labourist Movement Party	Marxism–Leninism
Akşener; İYİ	DP	Democratic Party	Liberal conservatism
Akşener; İYİ	DYP	True Path Party (Muğla branch)	Liberal conservatism
Perinçek; Patriotic	HEPAR	Rights and Equality Party	Turkish nationalism

== Controversies ==
=== State of emergency ===
On 20 July 2016, five days after an attempted coup, the government declared a state of emergency (Turkish: Olağanüstü Hal, OHAL), allowing ministers to rule the country by decree, bypassing parliament and limiting certain civil freedoms. The government have frequently been criticised for violating the constitutional limits of a state of emergency, using it as an excuse for governing without any political opposition. Since 2016, the state of emergency has been extended for the sixth time, with parliament voting to extend it by a further three months on 18 January 2018. The extension led to speculation that the election would occur under state of emergency conditions, similar to the 2017 constitutional referendum.

Heather Nauert, the Spokesperson for the United States Department of State and acting Under Secretary of State for Public Diplomacy and Public Affairs, issued a statement on 20 April citing 'concern' for whether free and fair elections would be possible under a state of emergency. On 24 April, the Parliamentary Assembly of the Council of Europe (PACE) issued a statement calling for the elections to be delayed, declaring that they would not meet European standards or be held in a democratic manner. Prince Zeid bin Ra'ad, the United Nations High Commissioner for Human Rights, also issued a statement calling for the state of emergency to end in order to guarantee credible elections.

The calls to end the state of emergency were criticised by the Turkish government and loyal members of parliament, who called the PACE declaration 'politicised, unfair, unjust and beyond the limits'. Prime minister Binali Yıldırım criticised PACE for being 'non-credible' due to it having invited Democratic Union Party (PYD) chairman Salih Muslim, who is regarded as a terrorist leader by Turkey, to give a speech. The Ministry of Foreign Affairs declared Nauert's statements about a forthcoming election 'unacceptable'.

=== Media censorship ===
Following his nomination as the CHP's presidential candidate on 4 May, Muharrem İnce began his campaign with a rally in his hometown of Yalova. It was noted that only pro-opposition TV channels such as Halk TV were covering the event, with the state broadcaster TRT notably absent. In his next rally at Balıkesir, İnce declared that if TRT were to continue not broadcasting opposition campaigns, he would march to the TRT headquarters with the CHP's 130 MPs and conduct his next rally in front of them.

A similar situation was observed during the İyi Party's first extraordinary congress on 1 April, which was only covered by Halk TV. In response, party leader Meral Akşener claimed that she had not embarked on her campaign with any expectations from 'the government's media'. The party subsequently sent the TRT photos from the congress, an abacus and a calculator as a 'present', so that they could count how many people attended the event.

=== Election violence ===
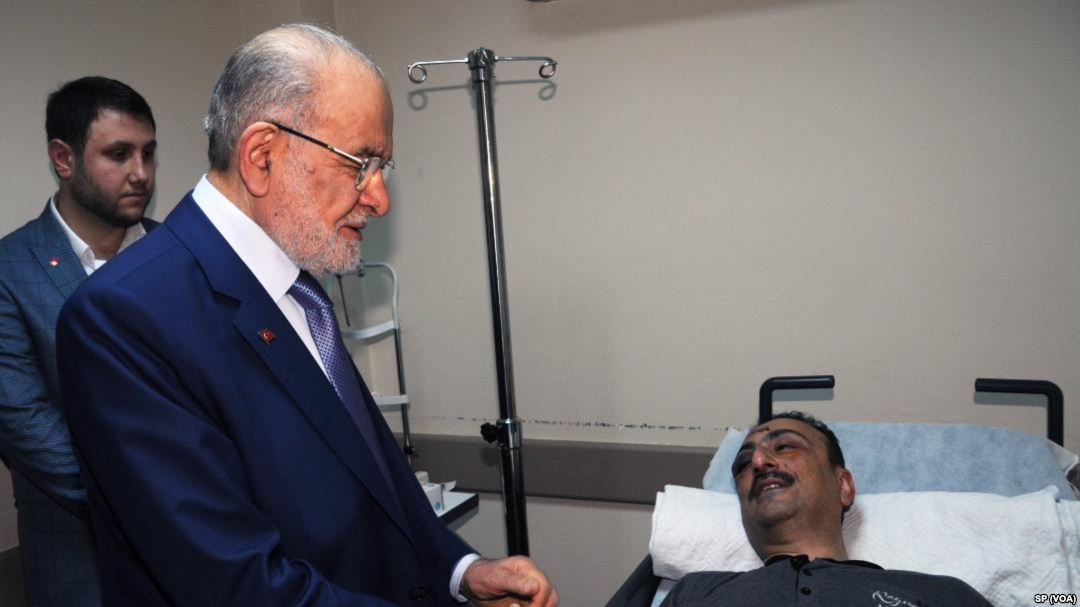
Felicity Party leader and candidate Temel Karamollaoğlu visits injured MP candidate Mehmet Fethi Öztürk in hospital, 26 May 2018

On 7 May, a group armed with knives and clubs consisting of allegedly 50 to 60 people approached an İyi Party election stand in Bağcılar, Istanbul, wounding 8 people with one in critical condition. The group allegedly consisted of rival Nationalist Movement Party (MHP) campaigners, many of which had reportedly been suspended from the party for past violent activity. A total of 8 people were arrested following the attack, with six being released and two being charged afterwards.

On 8 May, the house of İyi Party founding member Mehmet Aslan in Beykoz, Istanbul was shot at by unknown assailants. Aslan was not in the building at the time.

On 26 May, a group of Felicity Party and Nationalist Movement Party (MHP) activists engaged in a brawl in Ankara following a dispute over hanging up party flags. Clubs were used by MHP activists, injuring 7 Felicity Party activists with two in serious condition. Felicity Party MP candidate for Ankara, Mehmet Fethi Öztürk, was among the two seriously injured. Gunshots were also reported, which were blamed on Öztürk and led to his arrest while in hospital.

=== Nomination irregularities ===
The Supreme Electoral Council of Turkey (YSK) had devised a system to collect signatures for voters to nominate candidates, with the process taking place between 4 and 9 May. On 8 May, Patriotic Party leader Doğu Perinçek, who by that time was close to reaching the 100,000 signatures needed for nomination, criticised the system for irregularities. Perinçek claimed that the system has crashed throughout 8 May, affecting people who wanted to give signatures, criticising the government for incompetence. The crashes in the system caused doubt about whether Perinçek would reach the required 100,000 signatures by the 9 May deadline. Regardless, Perinçek managed to surpass 100,000 signatures by noon on 9 May.

=== Leaked speech ===
During a leaked speech of a private meeting with AK Party officials, Erdoğan ordered them to go in a great number as official representatives in voting locations to seize control of the ballot boxes, ensuring that the "work there would be finished before it even started". He also ordered them to target HDP voters with the help of AK Party local officials who he assured them would be in possession of voters lists to help with their "special work". This would be done in order to prevent HDP crossing the 10% electoral threshold, which would greatly help the AK Party and prevent a repeat of the "7 June experience", when the AK Party lost its parliamentary majority in an upset defeat.

== Opinion polls ==
Opinion polls have been conducted to gauge voter intentions for the presidential election. Polls have generally shown a clear lead for Recep Tayyip Erdoğan, though with vote totals below his 2014 election victory where he was elected with 51.8% of the vote outright. Indicating that a second round will most likely take place, the polls indicate that there is competition between Muharrem İnce and Meral Akşener over who will proceed to the run-off and face Erdoğan. Emboldened vote shares indicate percentages above 50%, indicating outright first round victory.

=== Graphical summary ===
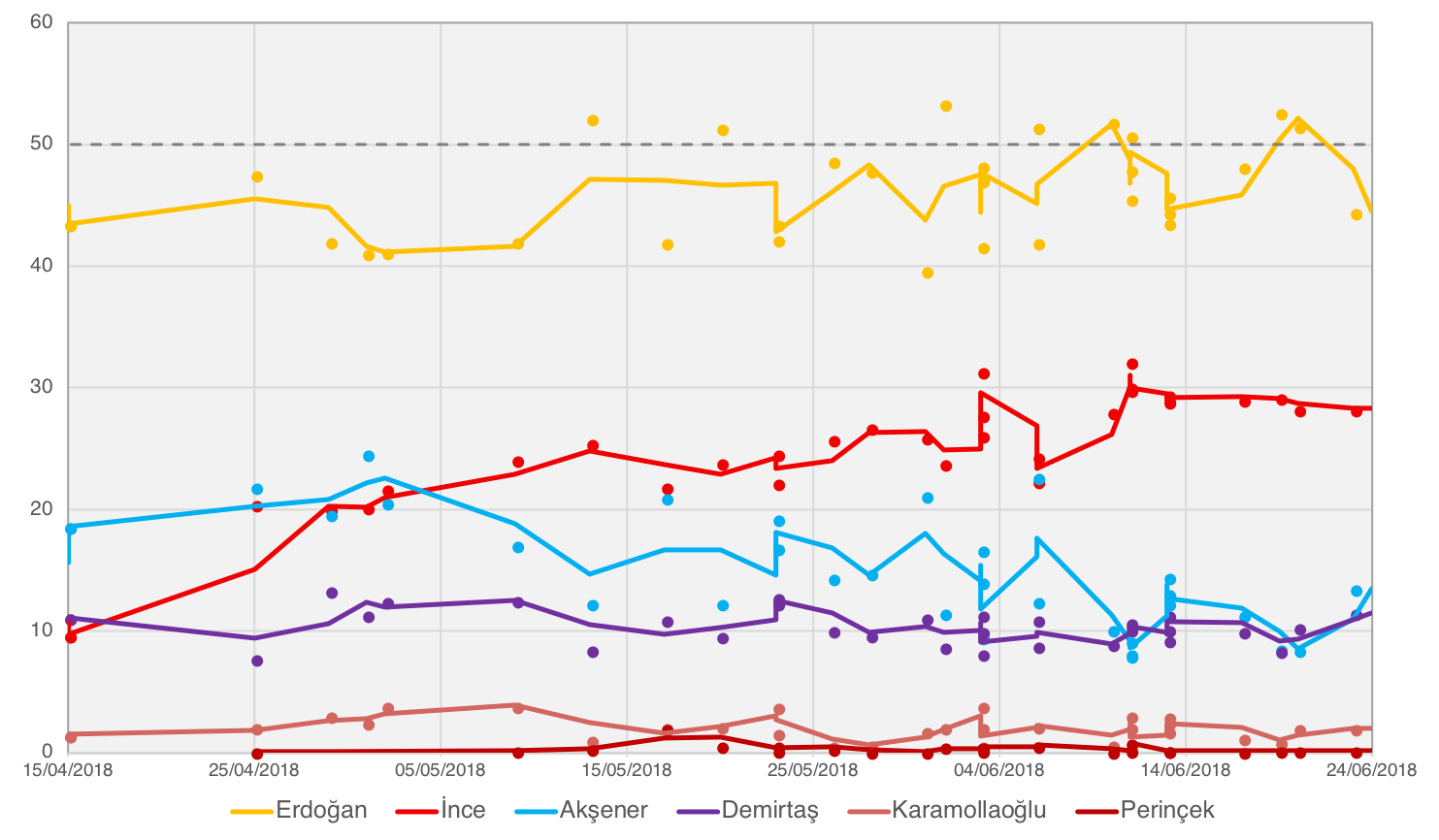

=== Voting intention ===
Date	Pollster	Sample size	Erdoğan	İnce	Akşener	Demirtaş	Karamollaoğlu	Perinçek	Lead 1	Lead 2
16–17 Jun 2018	Gezici	1,812	48.2	29.1	11.4	10.0	1.2	0.1	19.1	17.7
13 June 2018	Plus Mayak	–	45.8	28.9	13.1	10.2	1.8	0.2	16.9	15.8
13 June 2018	AKAM	2,460	44.5	29.0	14.5	9.3	2.5	0.2	15.5	15.5
6–13 Jun 2018	REMRES	5,674	43.6	29.5	12.3	11.4	3.0	0.2	14.1	17.2
11 June 2018	CHP	–	45.6	32.2	8.2	10.7	3.1	0.2	13.4	24.0
8–11 Jun 2018	Mediar	2,410	48.0	29.9	9.2	10.2	2.1	0.8	18.1	19.7
6 June 2018	İyi Party	–	42.0	22.4	22.7	11.0	1.9		19.3	0.3
1–6 Jun 2018	MAK	5,400	51.5	24.4	12.5	8.8	2.2	0.6	29.6	11.9
29 May–1 June 2018	Sonar	3,000	48.3	31.4	9.5	8.2	2.1	0.5	16.9	21.9
28 May–1 June 2018	ORC	3,410	53.4	23.8	11.5	8.7	2.1	0.5	29.6	12.3
1–28 May 2018	Konsensus	2,000	47.9	26.8	14.8	9.7	0.7	0.1	21.1	12.0
22–23 May 2018	Mediar	4,268	43.5	22.2	19.3	12.8	1.6	0.6	21.3	2.9
17–23 May 2018	REMRES	4,276	42.2	24.6	16.9	12.3	3.8	0.2	17.6	7.7
13–20 May 2018	MAK	5,000	51.4	23.9	12.3	9.6	2.2	0.6	27.5	11.6
7–17 May 2018	Sonar	3,000	42.0	21.9	21.0	11.0	2.1	2.0	20.1	0.9
25 Apr–13 May 2018	Politic's	2,650	52.2	25.5	12.3	8.5	1.1	0.4	26.7	13.2
6–9 May 2018	REMRES	3,653	42.1	24.1	17.1	12.6	3.9	0.2	18.0	7.0
10 Aug 2014	Election^{[a]}	–	51.7 (Erdoğan)	38.6 (İhsanoğlu)	—N/a	9.8 (Demirtaş)	—N/a	—N/a	13.1	26.8

== Results ==
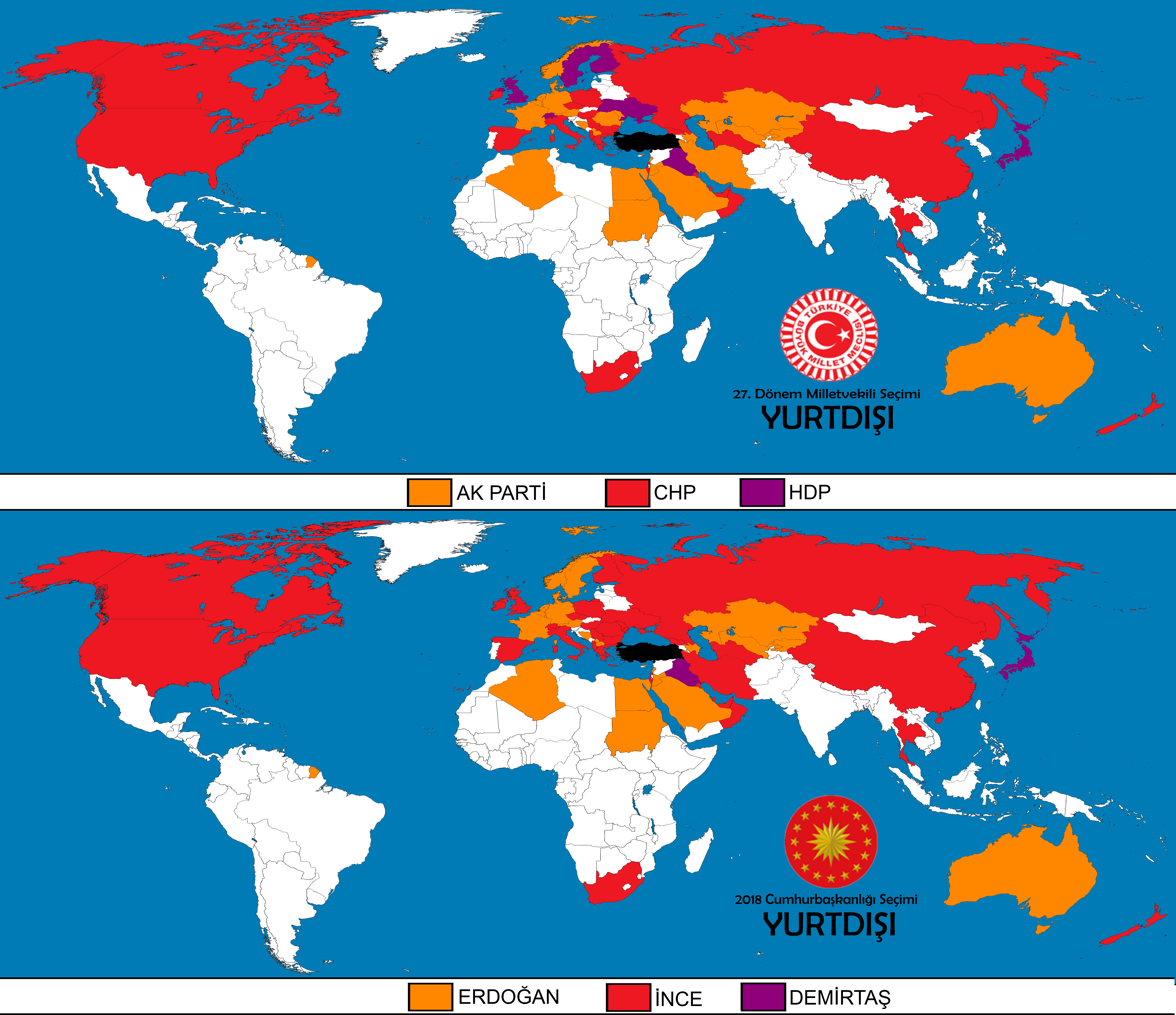
Winners according to countries

Candidate	Party	Votes	%
Recep Tayyip Erdoğan	Justice and Development Party	26,330,823	52.59
Muharrem İnce	Republican People's Party	15,340,321	30.64
Selahattin Demirtaş	Peoples' Democratic Party	4,205,794	8.40
Meral Akşener	Good Party	3,649,030	7.29
Temel Karamollaoğlu	Felicity Party	443,704	0.89
Doğu Perinçek	Patriotic Party	98,955	0.20
Total		50,068,627	100.00
Valid votes		50,068,627	97.79
Invalid/blank votes		1,129,332	2.21
Total votes		51,197,959	100.00
Registered voters/turnout		59,367,469	86.24
Source: YSK

=== By demographic groups ===
Sociology of the electorate
Demographic	Erdoğan	İnce	Demirtaş	Akşener	Karamollaoğlu
Total Vote	52.59%	30.64%	8.40%	7.29%	0.89%
Parliamentary election vote
AK PARTY	78%	1%	1%	5%	-
CHP	1%	71%	4%	9%	-
HDP	1%	10%	94%	0%	-
IYI	1%	13%	0%	72%	-
MHP	17%	4%	0%	13%	-
Nation+People (Alliance vote)	2%	1%	0%	1%	-
1 November 2015 vote
AK PARTY	89%	6%	1%	4%	0%
CHP	6%	89%	1%	4%	0%
HDP	10%	19%	71%	0%	0%
MHP	45%	25%	0%	25%	1%
2017 Constitutional Referendum vote
Yes	91%	4%	1%	3%	1%
No	9%	65%	15%	14%	1%
When decided
Voting Day	4%	4%	2%	3%	-
Final week	3%	3%	1%	9%	-
Between last 1–4 weeks	1%	10%	2%	8%	-
Between last 1–2 months	3%	13%	6%	9%	-
Before 2 months	89%	72%	87%	69%	-
No answer	0%	0%	1%	2%	-
Age
18–29 years old	50%	30%	11%	8%	1%
30–44 years old	53%	27%	12%	7%	1%
45+ years old	54%	33%	4%	8%	1%
Sex
Women	54%	35%	5%	6%	0,2%
Men	51%	26%	11%	10%	2%
Education
Elementary or less	60%	23%	10%	6%	1%
High school	52%	32%	6%	9%	1%
Bachelor's degree	32%	50%	7%	10%	1%
Employment status
Employee	51%	32%	8%	8%	1%
Unemployed	49%	27%	17%	6%	1%
Housewife	60%	28%	7%	5%	0%
Student/Non-working	59%	30%	7%	4%	0%
Retired	43%	31%	3%	21%	2%
Was the campaign process fair?
Fair	83%	19%	25%	26%	-
Not fair	14%	76%	75%	69%	-
No comment	4%	5%	10%	5%	-
Future expectance
Better	88%	12%	20%	13%	-
Same	6%	14%	18%	25%	-
Worse	3%	69%	55%	53%	-
Primary agenda of government should be
Economy	38%	44%	25%	52%	
Fight against terrorism	11%	4%	5%	9%	-
Education reform	4%	8%	2%	6%	-
Start of solution process	3%	3%	21%	9%	-
Cancellation of OHAL	1%	8%	11%	5%	-
Law reform	4%	5%	6%	2%	-
Foreign policy	3%	5%	1%	2%	-
Human rights and democracy	2%	5%	5%	3%	-
Source:Ipsos Turkey

== Reactions ==
=== Countries ===
- Azerbaijan – Azerbaijani President Ilham Aliyev congratulated Erdoğan on his election victory.
- France – French President Emmanuel Macron congratulated Erdoğan on his election victory.
- Germany – German Chancellor Angela Merkel congratulated Erdoğan on his election victory.
- Iran – Iranian President Hassan Rouhani congratulated Erdoğan on his election victory.
- Russia – Russian President Vladimir Putin congratulated Erdoğan on his election victory.
- United Kingdom – U.K. Prime Minister Theresa May congratulated Erdoğan on his election victory.
- United States – U.S. President Donald Trump called Erdoğan and congratulated him on his election victory.

=== International organizations ===
- European Union President of the European Council Donald Tusk and President of the European Commission Jean-Claude Juncker congratulated Erdoğan on his election victory.
