= 18th Republican People's Party Extraordinary Convention =

Party election in Turkey

2014 Republican People's Party leadership election
- 5–6 September 2014
- Turnout: 94.83%
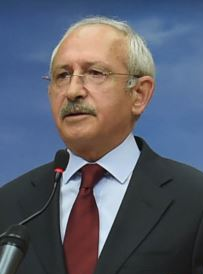

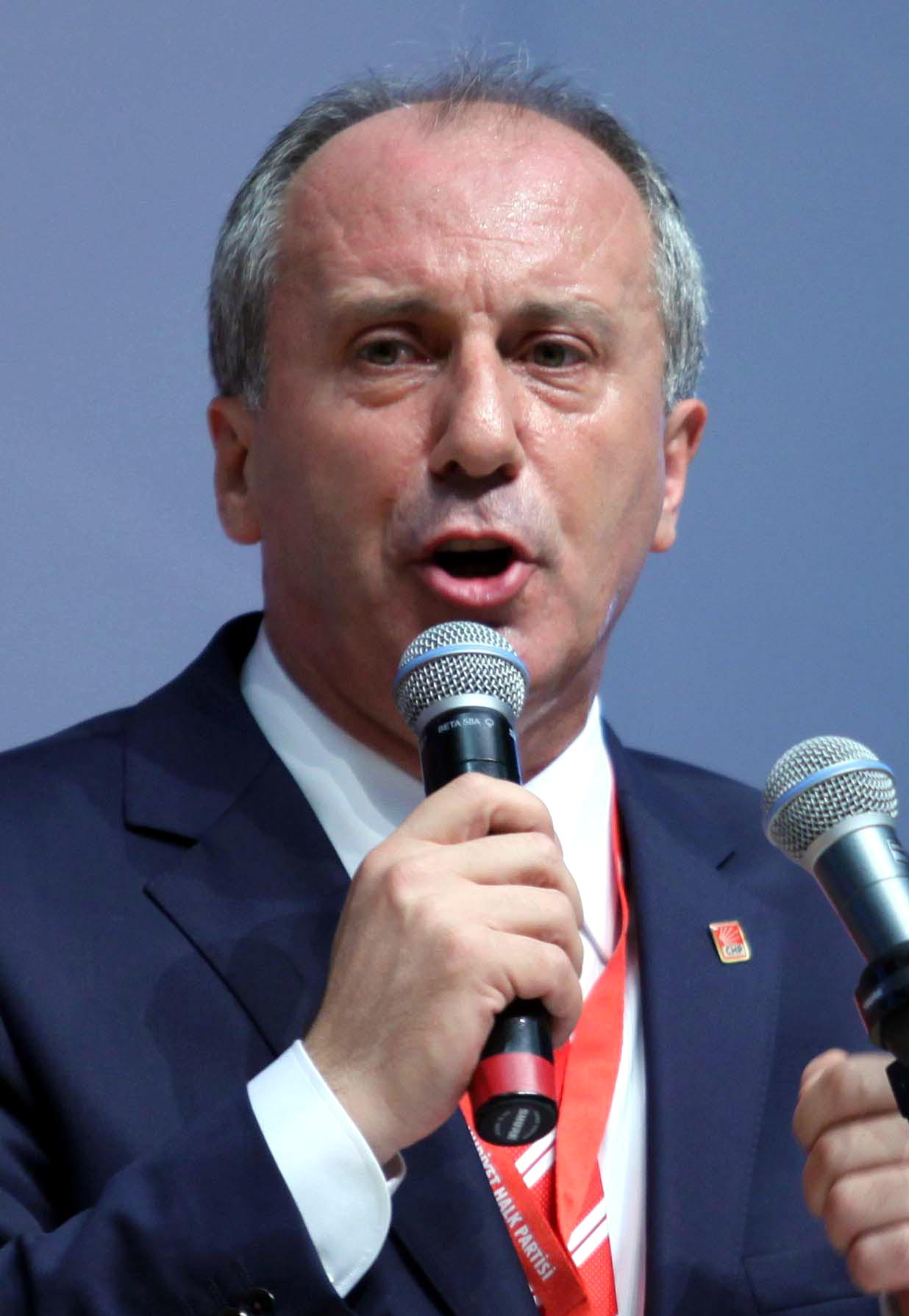
Candidate	Kemal Kılıçdaroğlu	Muharrem İnce
Party	CHP	CHP
Constituency	Istanbul	Yalova
Delegate vote	740	415
Percentage	64.07%	35.93%
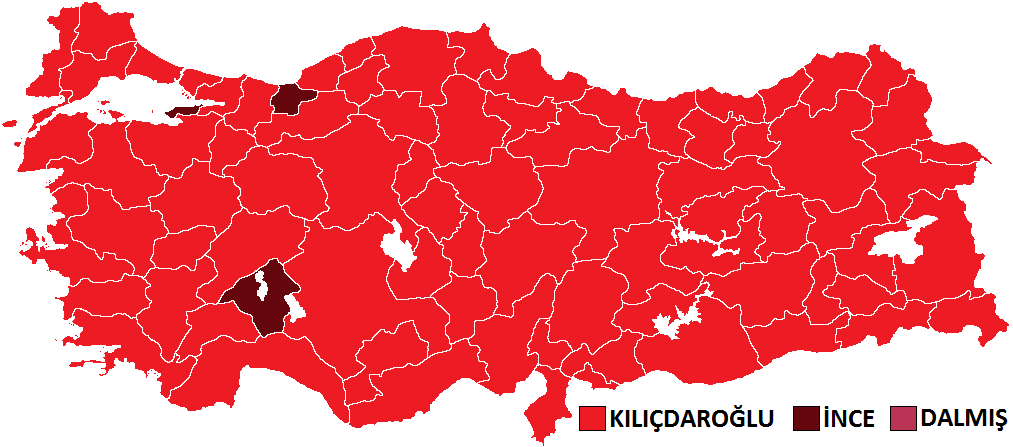
- Colours denote the supported candidate of the 81 provincial leaders of the CHP, by province Şahmar Dalmış was a third candidate for the leadership from Kars. He failed to gain sufficient nominations from delegates in order to register himself for the election.
Leader before election
Kemal Kılıçdaroğlu
CHP
Elected Leader
Kemal Kılıçdaroğlu
CHP

The 18th Republican People's Party Extraordinary Convention (Turkish: 18. CHP Olağanüstü Kurultayı) took place on 5 and 6 September 2014 in order to elect a leader of the Republican People's Party (Cumhuriyet Halk Partisi - CHP), a Turkish centre-left political party. Initially, an ordinary convention was due to be held in 2014, two years after the previous one in 2012. However, the party's incumbent leader Kemal Kılıçdaroğlu accepted calls for an extraordinary convention to be held following the loss of the CHP's presidential candidate Ekmeleddin İhsanoğlu in the presidential election held in August. The ordinary convention will thus be held in 2015 instead.

The result was a victory for incumbent leader Kemal Kılıçdaroğlu, who was re-elected with 64.1% of the delegates' votes. He had initially been nominated for the leadership with the signatures of 944 delegates (84.2%). His rival Muharrem İnce congratulated Kılıçdaroğlu and conceded defeat.

== Background ==
CHP leader Kemal Kılıçdaroğlu announced that his party would support Ekmeleddin İhsanoğlu's candidacy for the presidency, claiming further that he himself had thought of İhsanoğlu as an adequate candidate. Besides the controversy over İhsanoğlu's alleged lack of secular credentials, Kılıçdaroğlu drew criticism for not consulting MPs on his choice of candidate. When İhsanoğlu came a distant second with 38.44% of the vote in the presidential election, several MPs within the CHP voiced opposition to Kılıçdaroğlu's choice of candidate and called for an extraordinary convention to be held before the June 2015 general election. Such MPs included Emine Ülker Tarhan, Muharrem İnce and Süheyl Batum, with İnce claiming that former CHP leader Deniz Baykal also supported his opposition to Kılıçdaroğlu. Initially, Kılıçdaroğlu expressed regret for bringing the rebellious MPs into the party, accusing them of not helping in the presidential campaign and thus contributing to rival candidate Recep Tayyip Erdoğan's victory in the first round. Regardless, Kılıçdaroğlu and the CHP Youth Wing both accepted the notion to hold an extraordinary convention with a leadership election in September 2014, nullifying the need to obtain signatures before any convention can be proposed.

The convention is expected to take 3 days, either between 9–11 September or 14–17 September.

78 of 81 province heads of CHP except Yalova, Düzce and Isparta expressed their support to Kılıçdaroğlu.

== Candidates ==
=== Confirmed candidates ===
- Kemal Kılıçdaroğlu - incumbent leader of the CHP, supported by former Istanbul mayoral candidate Mustafa Sarıgül.
- Muharrem İnce - Former CHP parliamentary group leader
- Şahmar Dalmış - Member of Parliament candidate for Kars in the 2011, 1991 and 1987 general elections. Former engineer and campaign activist.

Candidate	Signatures	Percentage	Result
Kemal Kılıçdaroğlu	944	84.21	Nominated
Muharrem İnce	177	15.79	Nominated
Şahmar Dalmış	0	0.00	Eliminated
Total	1,121	100.0	2 candidates
Source: Sabah

=== Possible candidates ===
- Emine Ülker Tarhan - A CHP MP seen as a potential presidential candidate who decided not to run against Ekmeleddin İhsanoğlu.

=== Declined candidates ===
Metin Feyzioğlu, who currently serves as the President of the Turkish Bars Association, stated that he would not be a candidate for the CHP leadership on 16 August. Feyizoğlu had become famous for his opposition to Recep Tayyip Erdoğan when the two publicly quarrelled at the State Council's 146th anniversary ceremony. In late August 2014, Feyizoğlu stated that he did not regard the convention as democratic due to being held at such short notice and claimed that he would have been a candidate had the convention met "democratic standards".

== Opinion polls ==
Although normal CHP members or supporters could not vote, opinion polls were conducted to gauge voter's preferences before the convention.

Date	Pollster	Sample	Kılıçdaroğlu	İnce	Others	Lead
Sep 2014	Konsensus	10,500	31	59	10	28
Aug 2014	ORC	1,250	38.8	40.0	9.5	1.2
Date	Pollster	Sample				Lead
Date	Pollster	Sample	Kılıçdaroğlu	İnce	Others	Lead

== Results ==
Party	Candidate	Votes	%
CHP	Kemal Kılıçdaroğlu	740	64.1
CHP	Muharrem İnce	415	35.9
Invalid/blank votes		26	–
Total		1,181	100.0
Number of delegates/turnout		1,218	94.8
