= 2018 Muharrem İnce presidential campaign =

Muharrem İnce for President
- Campaigned for: 2018 Turkish presidential election
- Candidate: Muharrem İnce; Member of the Grand National Assembly (2012-present); Parliamentary group leader of the CHP (2010-2014)
- Affiliation: CHP
- Status: Announced; 3 May 2018; Official nominee 4 May 2018; Lost Election; 24 June 2018
- Slogan: Türkiye’ye güvence Muharrem İnce”, "Muharrem İnce, an assurance to Turkey".

Muharrem İnce, a member of parliament for Yalova, was announced as the presidential candidate of the Republican People's Party (CHP) on 3 May 2018. The following day, on 4 May, party leader Kemal Kilicdaroglu formally proclaimed the CHP's support for İnce. Shortly thereafter, the CHP began preparations for the campaign season, launching the production of campaign material and merchandise. It was revealed in early May that İnce's campaign would adopt the slogan “Türkiye’ye güvence Muharrem İnce”, roughly translating to "Muharrem İnce, an assurance to Turkey." The campaign began with an election rally in his home city of Yalova on 5 May.

== Program ==
- Defending “No” for the 2017 Turkish constitutional referendum
  - 18 proposed amendments to the Constitution of Turkey
    (Full details)
- Turkey should use and protect Kemalist ideas
- The support of Turkish membership of the European Union

=== Economic policy ===
In a 26 May interview on his campaign trail, İnce, when asked about the ongoing Turkish currency and debt crisis, said on economic policy that "the central bank can only halt the lira’s slide temporarily by raising interest rates, because it’s not the case that depreciation fundamentally stems from interest rates being too high or too low. So, the central bank will intervene, but the things that really need to be done are in the political and legal areas. Turkey needs to immediately be extricated from a political situation that breeds economic uncertainty, and its economy must be handled by independent and autonomous institutions. My economic team is ready, and we have been working together for a long time."

=== Kurdish issue ===
In his campaign rallies, İnce pledged to allow education in the Kurdish language and to solve the Kurdish issue through dialogue rather than violence.

=== Foreign policy ===
On European Union–Turkey relations, İnce is committed to Turkey’s bid to join the EU, the roots of which he traces back to the 1830s, during the Ottoman Empire’s Tanzimat period. He cites broad support among Turkey’s youth for a future with better employment opportunities as the main reason for Turkey to embrace further European integration in higher education and promises to give back dignity to the Foreign Ministry’s professional diplomats who are ridiculed by Islamist government trolls.

On Syria Turkey relations, he has proposed to end Turkey’s longstanding opposition to Syria’s President Bashar al-Assad, saying cooperation with the regime would facilitate the return of some of the 3.5 million Syrian refugees living in Turkish camps.

“When I become president, we will have an ambassador to Syria,” Mr. Ince told supporters during a recent rally.

Turkey broke diplomatic relations with Syria in 2012.

== Campaigning ==
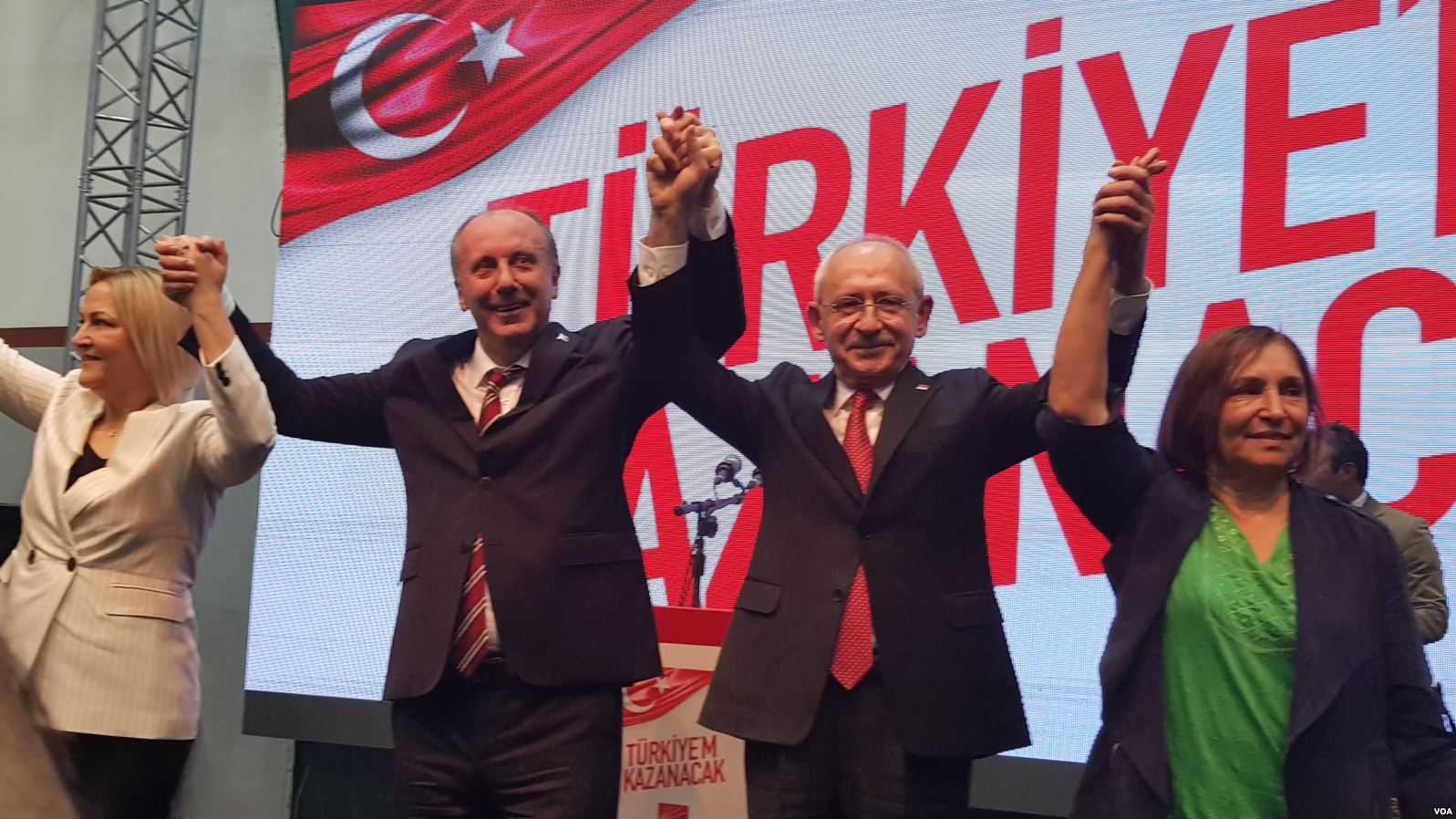
Muharrem İnce being announced as the CHP's presidential candidate on 4 May

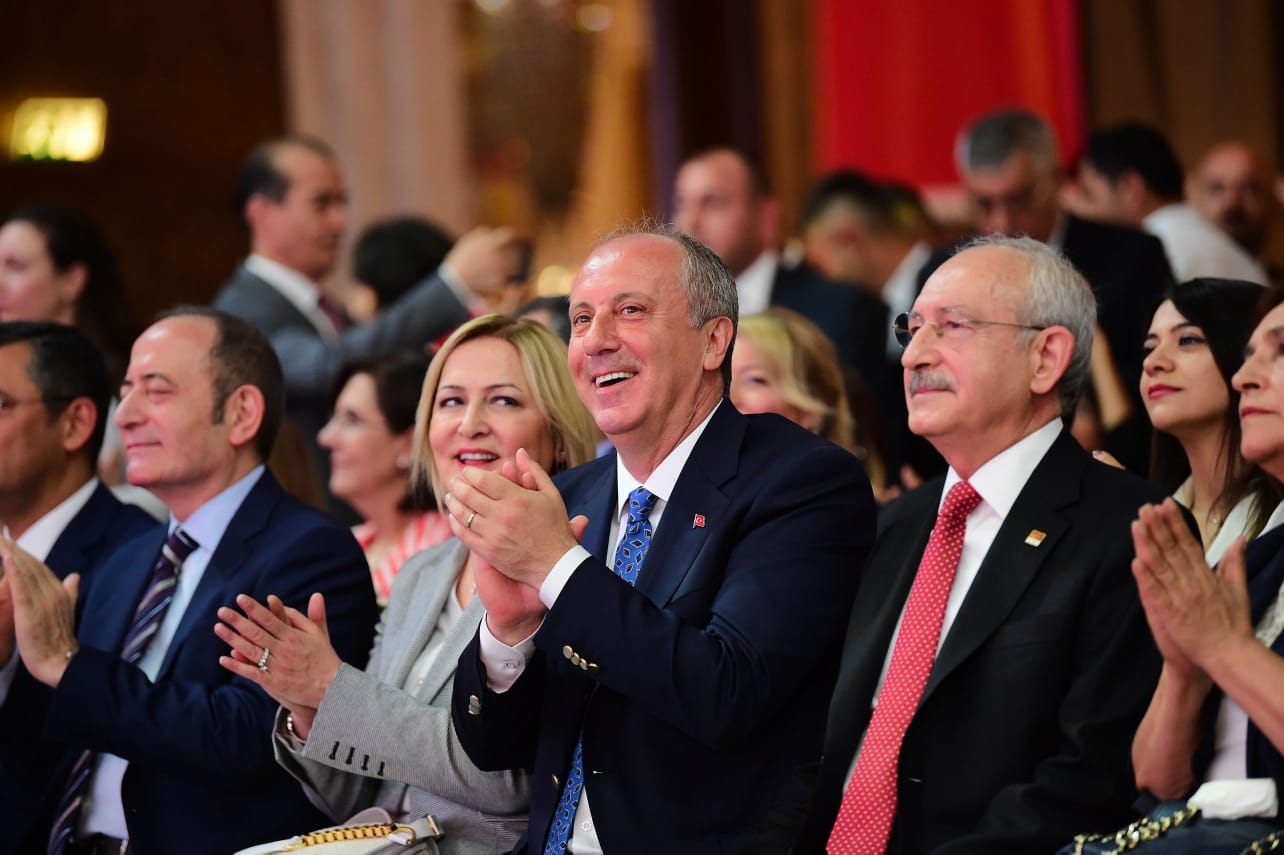
Muharrem İnce at the CHP manifesto launch, 26 May

As of 31 May, media suggested that "even die-hard CHP critics would concede" that İnce was "performing far better than expected", crisscrossing the country with a focus on promises to restore democracy and rule of law, and to offer better pay and education. With respect to president Recep Tayyip Erdoğan, he displayed a mix of contempt and near pity. Over the last week of May, İnce saw a 74 percent increase in social media popularity, bringing him close to Erdoğan who maintained the top spot on social media, with mentions and tags pertaining to him hitting the 1.3 million mark, with İnce at just over 1 million, while competitors Meral Akşener had 280,852, Selahattin Demirtaş 201,922 and Temel Karamollaoğlu 181,703.

== Election result ==
Candidate	Party	Votes	%
Recep Tayyip Erdoğan	Justice and Development Party	26,330,823	52.59
Muharrem İnce	Republican People's Party	15,340,321	30.64
Selahattin Demirtaş	Peoples' Democratic Party	4,205,794	8.40
Meral Akşener	Good Party	3,649,030	7.29
Temel Karamollaoğlu	Felicity Party	443,704	0.89
Doğu Perinçek	Patriotic Party	98,955	0.20
Total		50,068,627	100.00
Valid votes		50,068,627	97.79
Invalid/blank votes		1,129,332	2.21
Total votes		51,197,959	100.00
Registered voters/turnout		59,367,469	86.24
Source: YSK
