= Şahmar Dalmış =

Şahmar Dalmış (born in İncesu village, Susuz, Kars) is a Turkish politician from the Republican People's Party (CHP), which he joined in 1996.

== Career ==
Şahmar Dalmış is an engineer and a graduate from Istanbul Technical University (İTÜ). He was a candidate to become a Member of Parliament from Kars as an independent in the 1987 general election and from the Democratic Left Party in the 1991 general election. In the 2011 general election, he applied to become a candidate from the CHP but failed to make the Kars party list. Initially a staunch supporter of party leader Kemal Kılıçdaroğlu, Dalmış announced his candidacy for the CHP leadership for the 2014 CHP extraordinary convention, but failed to gain any nominations from party delegates. His speech afterwards which heavily criticised the CHP leadership, who he claimed had attempted to silence his bid for the leadership, received record views.

== See also ==
- Muharrem İnce
