= Justice and Development Party Youth =

Justice and Development Party Youth (also known as AK Youth) (Turkish: AK Parti Gençlik Kolları) is the youth organization of the Justice and Development Party in Turkey.

The current chairperson is Ahmet Büyükgümüş.

The youth wing publishes a magazine titled Türkiye Gençlik Bülteni (Türkiye Youth Bulletin).
