= Ahmet Büyükgümüş =

Turkish politician (born 1990)

Member of the Grand National Assembly
- Incumbent
- Assumed office 7 July 2018
- Constituency: Yalova

Personal details
- Born: 1990 (age 35–36)
- Party: Justice and Development Party

Ahmet Büyükgümüş (born 1990) is a Turkish politician serving as a member of the Grand National Assembly since 2018. From 2018 to 2021, he served as chairman of the Justice and Development Party Youth.
