= 2018 Recep Tayyip Erdoğan presidential campaign =

Recep Tayyip Erdoğan for President
- Campaigned for: 2018 Turkish presidential election
- Candidate: Recep Tayyip Erdoğan; Incumbent President of Turkey (2014–present); Prime Minister of Turkey (2003–2014); Mayor of Istanbul (1994–1998)
- Affiliation: People's Alliance
- Status: Announced; 28 April 2018; Official nominee 3 May 2018

Recep Tayyip Erdoğan, incumbent President of Turkey since 2014, was officially nominated as the presidential candidate of the Justice and Development Party (AKP) on 3 May 2018. Shortly thereafter, the nominally oppositional Nationalist Movement Party (MHP) reiterated that it would endorse Erdoğan's candidacy, and would jointly apply to the electoral commission for its formal registration. After the MHP announced that they will endorse Erdoğan’s campaign, the BBP announced the support for Erdoğan’s candidacy. In early May, it was confirmed by Erdoğan that he would be visiting the Bosnian capital of Sarajevo in the early stages of the campaign, most likely on 20 May 2018, and hold campaign rallies with the Bosnian Turks to drum up support for his re-election bid.

== Program ==
- Defending “Yes” for the 2017 Turkish constitutional referendum
  - 18 proposed amendments to the Constitution of Turkey
    (Full details)
- "Our youth are our strongest quality, in terms of economic growth we will make the best use of this quality," Erdogan said, before promising more female participation in the country's workforce.
- "When we [AK Party] came to government, we moved our country from low-wage level to mid-wage level, and now our aim is to move to higher levels on that scale," he said.
- Relations with EU
  - ”Erdogan's remarks came shortly after the country's central bank announced a sharp interest rate rise from 13.5 percent to 16.5 percent to halt the fall in the value of the lira.”
  - ”He also said he will attempt to repair strained relations with countries in Europe.”
  - "We will strengthen our economic and political ties with various regional structures, especially the EU. We want all brotherly nations in our region and the world to reach better welfare, together with our nation," Erdogan said.
- Women's participation
  - ”Improving women's work opportunities will also continue to be high on the political agenda, the president said.”
  - "We have come a long way in bringing our women to the positions they deserve. We will continue to increase women's participation in every area, from politics to bureaucracy, culture to art, and to non-governmental activities," he said.
- “Turkey will keep fighting with Kurdish separatists and Islamic State of Iraq and the Levant who cause terror attacks in the country.”

== Election result ==
Candidate	Party	Votes	%
Recep Tayyip Erdoğan	Justice and Development Party	26,330,823	52.59
Muharrem İnce	Republican People's Party	15,340,321	30.64
Selahattin Demirtaş	Peoples' Democratic Party	4,205,794	8.40
Meral Akşener	Good Party	3,649,030	7.29
Temel Karamollaoğlu	Felicity Party	443,704	0.89
Doğu Perinçek	Patriotic Party	98,955	0.20
Total		50,068,627	100.00
Valid votes		50,068,627	97.79
Invalid/blank votes		1,129,332	2.21
Total votes		51,197,959	100.00
Registered voters/turnout		59,367,469	86.24
Source: YSK

== Party representation ==
- Justice and Development Party
- Nationalist Movement Party
- Great Unity Party
- Free Cause Party
