= AS Party =

AS Party AS Parti
- Abbreviation: ASP
- Chairman: Cavit Kayıkçı
- Founded: February 3, 2015
- Dissolved: August 6, 2025
- Headquarters: Ankara, Turkey
- Membership (2024): 0
- Ideology: Pro-military
- Slogan: 'Civilian military'

The AS Party (Turkish: AS Parti, ASP) was a Turkish political party formed on 3 February 2015. Its leader is Cavit Kayıkcı and uses the slogan "civilian military" on its logo.

The ASP is largely composed of retired junior officers of the Turkish Armed Forces (TSK) and seeks to represent soldiers' interests in politics. The party aims to provide a platform for officers to have a larger say in Turkish politics while improving civil-military relations that have historically been strained.

== Activities ==
On 17 January 2018, the Constitutional Court of Turkey threw out a case involving the closure of the party, on the grounds that it had dissolved and had not undergone any congresses as required by law.

On 18 May 2018, the AS Party announced its support for the People's Alliance in the forthcoming 24 June 2018 general elections.
