= 2018 Temel Karamollaoğlu presidential campaign =

Turkish politician's presidential campaign

Temel Karamollaoğlu for President
- Campaign: 2018 Turkish presidential election
- Candidate: Temel Karamollaoğlu; Leader of Felicity Party (2016–present); Member of the Grand National Assembly (1996-2002); Mayor of Sivas (1989–1995)
- Affiliation: SP
- Status: Announced; 1 May 2018; Official nominee 6 May 2018
- Slogan: "Türkiye'ye Bilge Başkan" (A Wise Leader to Turkey).

Temel Karamollaoğlu was nominated as the candidate of the Felicity Party (SP) on 6 May 2018, after he had successfully collected the 100,000 signatures required for minor party candidates to gain ballot access. Karamollaoğlu's campaign adopted the slogan "Türkiye'ye Bilge Başkan" (A Wise Leader to Turkey).

== Program ==
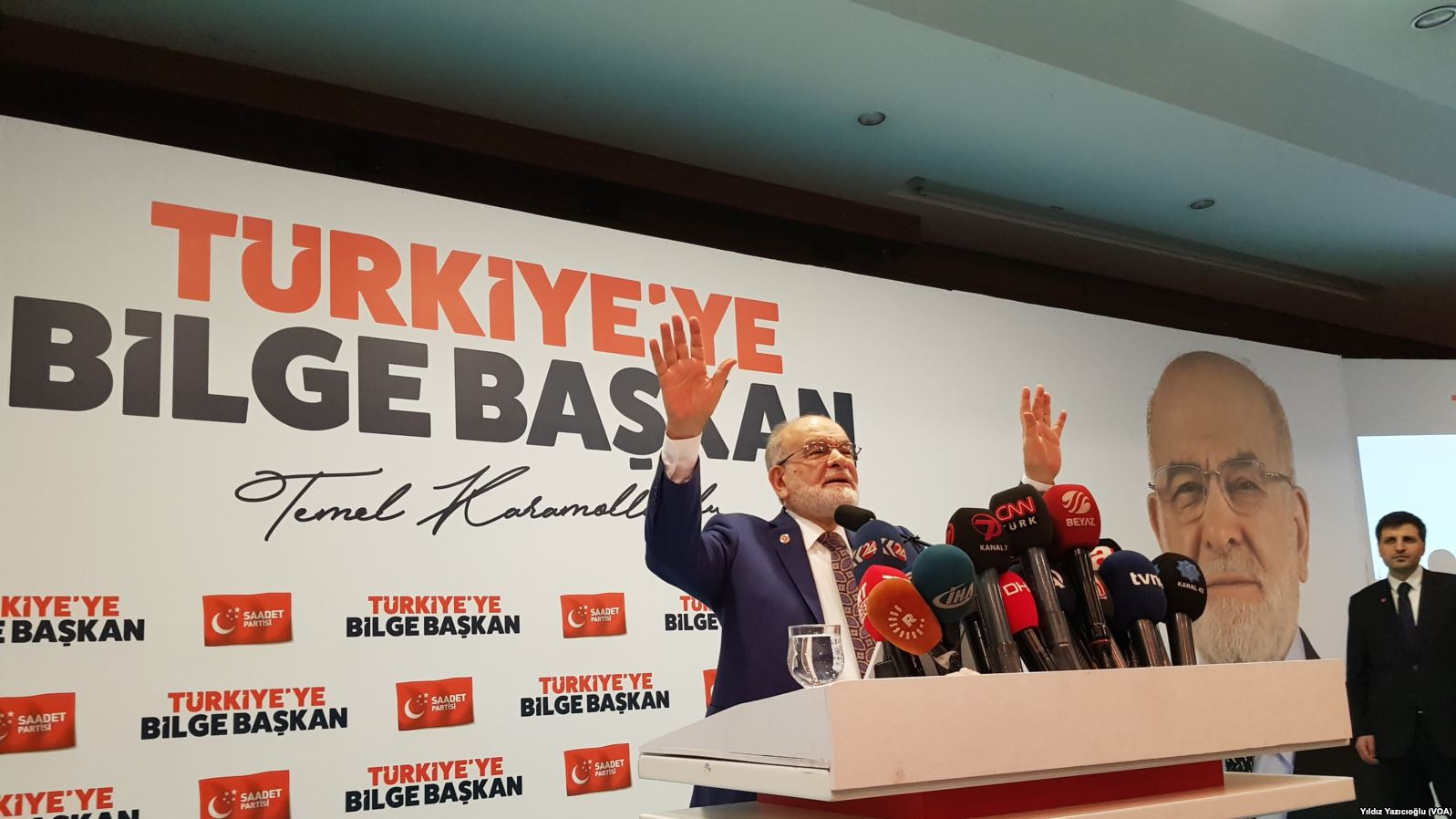
Temel Karamollaoğlu beginning his campaign on 1 May

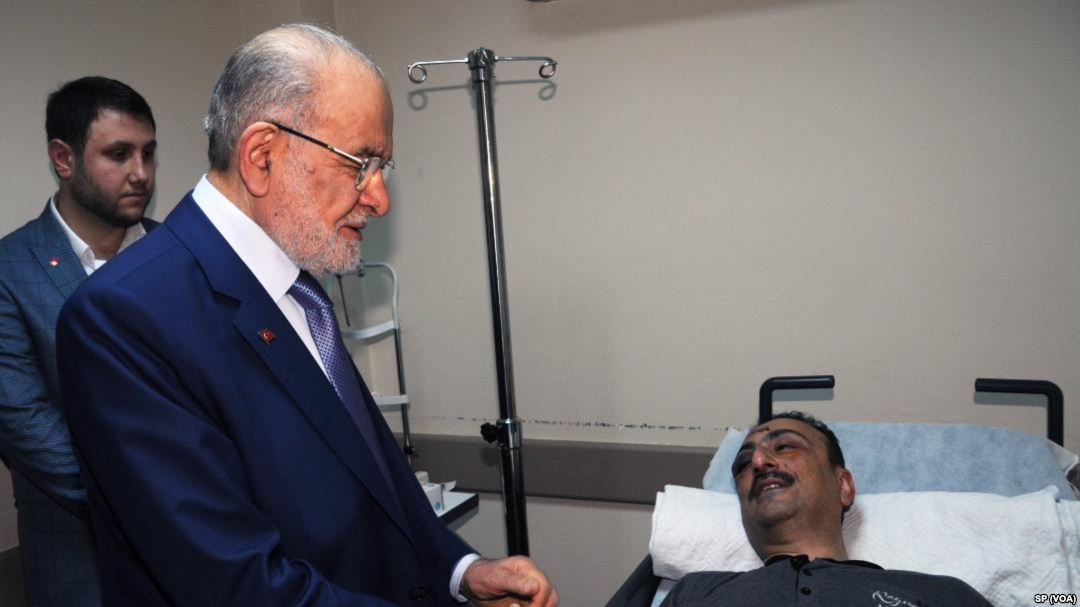
Felicity Party leader and candidate Temel Karamollaoğlu visits injured MP candidate Mehmet Fethi Öztürk in hospital, 26 May 2018

- Defending “No” for the 2017 Turkish constitutional referendum
  - 18 proposed amendments to the Constitution of Turkey
    (Full details)
- Rejection of joining the European Union
- End of military ties with Israel and the United States
- Turkey must adapt its military and foreign policy stance to meet what it argues are increasing threats coming from the West to all Muslim countries
- Turkey should use and protect Erbakan's ideas and philosophy.

=== Foreign policy ===
On European Union–Turkey relations, Karamollaoğlu argues that Turkey as a Muslim majority country would never be allowed membership in the EU. He suggests negotiating a privileged partnership with the EU on issues such as trade, investments, travel arrangements, foreign relations and on other political issues similar to that of Norway, or the status Britain is trying to secure.

== Election Result ==
Candidate	Party	Votes	%
Recep Tayyip Erdoğan	Justice and Development Party	26,330,823	52.59
Muharrem İnce	Republican People's Party	15,340,321	30.64
Selahattin Demirtaş	Peoples' Democratic Party	4,205,794	8.40
Meral Akşener	Good Party	3,649,030	7.29
Temel Karamollaoğlu	Felicity Party	443,704	0.89
Doğu Perinçek	Patriotic Party	98,955	0.20
Total		50,068,627	100.00
Valid votes		50,068,627	97.79
Invalid/blank votes		1,129,332	2.21
Total votes		51,197,959	100.00
Registered voters/turnout		59,367,469	86.24
Source: YSK
