= 2018 Selahattin Demirtaş presidential campaign =

Selahattin Demirtaş for President
- Campaigned for: 2018 Turkish presidential election
- Candidate: Selahattin Demirtaş; Former chairman of the HDP (2014-2018); Presidential candidate for the 2014 presidential election (2014); The former leader of the BDP (2010-2014)
- Affiliation: HDP (Note: Supported by the left-wing political parties and groups of the HDK)
- Status: Announced; 25 Apr 2018; Official nominee 4 May 2018

Selahattin Demirtaş was officially announced as the candidate of the People's Democratic Party (HDP) on 4 May 2018, after members of the party had hinted at his candidacy weeks in advance. Party leader Pervin Buldan declared that Demirtaş, a jailed former co-chair of the HDP, would be leading a five-party "Kurdish alliance" into the general election.

== Program ==
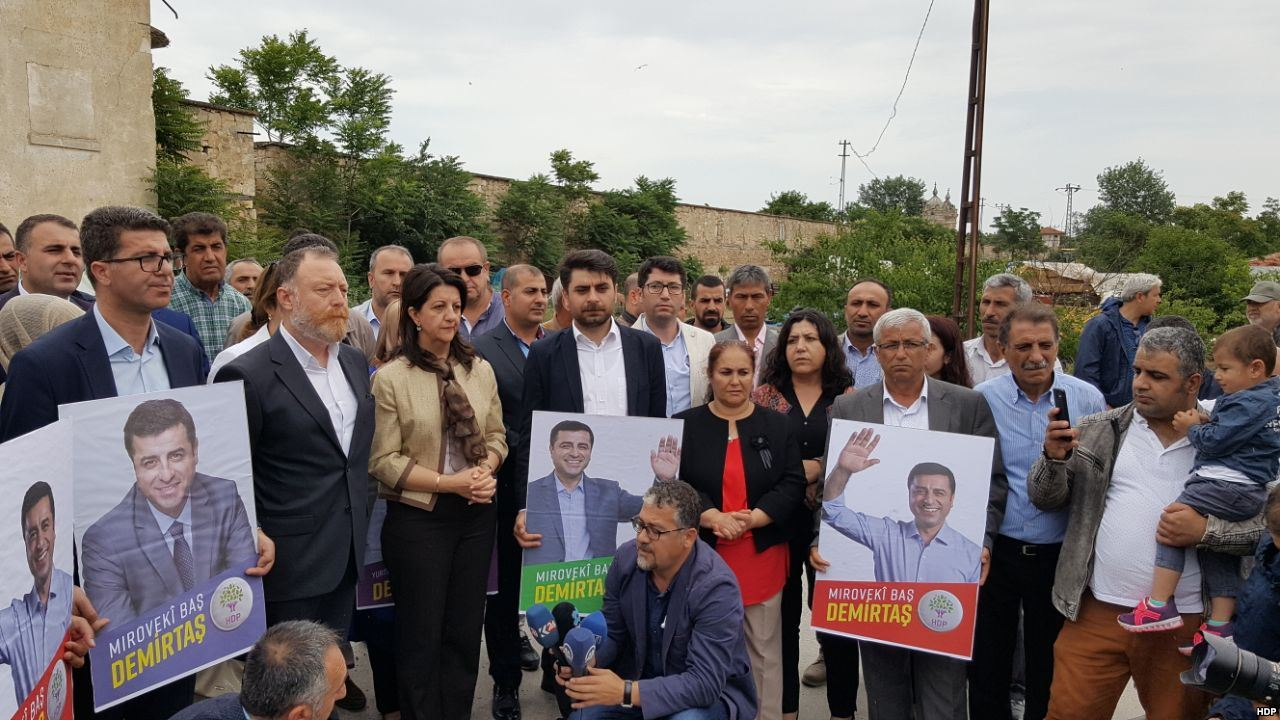
Selahattin Demirtaş's campaign being launched outside Edirne prison where he is incarcerated, 25 May

- Defending “No” for the 2017 Turkish constitutional referendum
  - 18 proposed amendments to the Constitution of Turkey
    (Full details)
- More Minority and Women’s rights
- Building a country without Capitalism
- The support of Turkish membership of the European Union

=== Foreign policy ===
On European Union–Turkey relations, Demirtaş is known for his long-time support for Turkey’s EU accession process, focusing on the pledge to uphold human rights, local democracy, separation of powers and the rule of law as the main tenets of his future presidency. He distinguishes himself from other candidates in his unwavering criticism of what he sees as Brussels's neo-liberal economic agenda.

== Election Result ==
Candidate	Party	Votes	%
Recep Tayyip Erdoğan	Justice and Development Party	26,330,823	52.59
Muharrem İnce	Republican People's Party	15,340,321	30.64
Selahattin Demirtaş	Peoples' Democratic Party	4,205,794	8.40
Meral Akşener	Good Party	3,649,030	7.29
Temel Karamollaoğlu	Felicity Party	443,704	0.89
Doğu Perinçek	Patriotic Party	98,955	0.20
Total		50,068,627	100.00
Valid votes		50,068,627	97.79
Invalid/blank votes		1,129,332	2.21
Total votes		51,197,959	100.00
Registered voters/turnout		59,367,469	86.24
Source: YSK
