= Yalova (electoral district) =

Electoral district for the Grand National Assembly of Turkey

Coordinates: 40°35′N 29°10′E

- electoral district for the Grand National Assembly of Turkey
- Yalova shown within Turkey
- Province: Yalova
- Electorate: 149,841

Current electoral district
- Created: 1995
- Seats: 3
- MPs: List: Ahmet Büyükgümüş AKP Meliha Akyol AKP Özcan Özel CHP
- Turnout at last election: 85.38%
- Representation
- AK Party: 2 / 3
- CHP: 1 / 3

Yalova is an electoral district of the Grand National Assembly of Turkey. It elects 3 members of parliament (deputies) to represent the province of the same name for a four-year term by the D'Hondt method, a party-list proportional representation system.

== Members ==
Population reviews of each electoral district are conducted before each general election, which can lead to certain districts being granted a smaller or greater number of parliamentary seats. Yalova has elected two MPs to parliament since becoming a province in 1995. Prior to that date, it was part of Istanbul for electoral purposes.

MPs for Yalova, 1999 onwards
Seat	1999 (21st parliament)	2002 (22nd parliament)	2007 (23rd parliament)	2011 (24th parliament)	June 2015 (25th parliament)
MP	Yaşar Okuyan; Motherland	Şükrü Önder; AK Party	İlhan Evcin; AK Party	Temel Coşkun; AK Party	Fikri Demirel; AK Party
MP	Hasan Suna; DSP	Muharrem İnce; CHP			

== General elections ==
=== 2011 ===
2011 Turkish general election: Yalova
List	Candidates	Votes	Of total (%)	± from prev.
AK Party	Temel Coşkun	59,175	47.23	
CHP	Muharrem İnce	40,975	32.70	
MHP	None elected	13,112	10.46	
Independent	İhsan Coşkun	5841	4.66	
SAADET	None elected	1942	1.55	
Büyük Birlik	None elected	938	0.75	
DP	None elected	882	0.7	
HAS Party	None elected	812	0.65	N/A
HEPAR	None elected	453	0.36	
DSP	None elected	350	0.28	'"`UNIQ−−ref−00000012−QINU`"'
DYP	None elected	1954	0.15	
Labour	None elected	233	0.19	
TKP	None elected	177	0.14	
Nationalist Conservative	None elected	98	0.08	
Liberal Democrat	None elected	71	0.06	
MP	None elected	50	0.04	
Turnout		125,303	85.38	

=== June 2015 ===
Abbr.	Party	Votes	%
AK Party	Justice and Development Party	54,366	39.5%
CHP	Republican People's Party	40,065	29.1%
MHP	Nationalist Movement Party	26,778	19.5%
HDP	Peoples' Democratic Party	11,422	8.3%
	Other	5,023	3.6%
Total		137,654	
Turnout		84.39	
source: YSK

=== June 2015 ===
Abbr.	Party	Votes	%
AK Party	Justice and Development Party	68,818	49.1%
CHP	Republican People's Party	44,405	31.7%
MHP	Nationalist Movement Party	13,866	9.9%
HDP	Peoples' Democratic Party	9,129	6.5%
	Other	3,938	2.8%
Total		140,156	
Turnout		84.50	
source: YSK

=== 2018 ===
Abbr.	Party	Votes	%
AK Party	Justice and Development Party	65,787	43.1%
CHP	Republican People's Party	43,843	28.8%
IYI	Good Party	15,089	9.9%
HDP	Peoples' Democratic Party	11,713	7.7%
MHP	Nationalist Movement Party	11,659	7.6%
SP	Felicity Party	1,995	1.3%
	Other	2,381	1.6%
Total		152,467	
Turnout		87.08	
source: YSK

== Presidential elections ==
=== 2014 ===
Presidential Election 2014: Yalova
Party	Candidate	Votes	%
AK Party	Recep Tayyip Erdoğan	61,343	50.20
Independent	Ekmeleddin İhsanoğlu	53,700	43.95
HDP	Selahattin Demirtaş	7,144	5.85
Total votes		122,187	100.00
Rejected ballots		1,985	1.60
Turnout		124,172	75.41
Recep Tayyip Erdoğan win			
