= Muharrem İnce =

Turkish politician

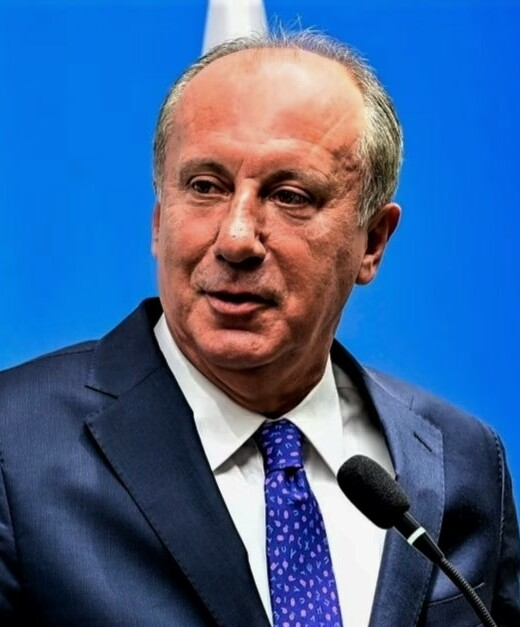
- İnce in 2023

Leader of the Memleket Party
- In office 17 May 2021 – 24 June 2025
- Preceded by: Position established
- Succeeded by: Asuman Ali Güven (acting)

Parliamentary deputy group leader of the Republican People's Party
- In office 1 June 2010 – 18 August 2014
- Leader: Kemal Kılıçdaroğlu
- Served with: Akif Hamzaçebi; Engin Altay; Emine Ülker Tarhan; Kemal Anadol
- Preceded by: Hakkı Suha Okay
- Succeeded by: Levent Gök

Member of the Grand National Assembly
- In office 14 November 2002 – 16 May 2018
- Constituency: Yalova (2002, 2007, 2011, June 2015, Nov. 2015)

Personal details
- Born: 4 May 1964 (age 62) Elmalık, Yalova, Turkey
- Party: CHP (1992–2021, 2025–present)
- Other political affiliations: SODEP (1983–1985); SHP (1985–1992); Homeland Party (2021–2025)
- Spouse: Ülkü İnce
- Children: 1
- Education: Balıkesir University
- Website: www.muharremince.com.tr

Muharrem İnce (Turkish: [inˈdʒe]; born 4 May 1964) is a Turkish physics teacher, school principal, sport executive, and politician. He is currently a member of CHP. He was the founder of the Homeland Party from May 2021 to July 2025. Formerly a four term Republican People's Party (Turkish: Cumhuriyet Halk Partisi, CHP) MP for Yalova, his hometown, he also served as the CHP's parliamentary group deputy chairman between June 2010 and August 2014.

İnce has stood for election as CHP chairman twice against former chairman Kemal Kılıçdaroğlu: first in September 2014 following the party's loss in the Turkish presidential election on 18 August 2014, and later in February 2018.

As the presidential candidate of the CHP in the 2018 Turkish presidential election, İnce received just over 30 percent of the votes, placing second behind outright first-round winner Recep Tayyip Erdoğan, with 53 percent. In 2023, İnce stood for president again, but as an independent candidate. However, before the election day, he suspended his campaign.

== Biography ==
İnce was born in the village of Elmalık in the province of Yalova as the son of Şerif and Zekiye İnce. His paternal grandparents originated from modern-day Drama in Greek Macedonia, his maternal grandparents originated from Rize on the Black Sea coast of Anatolia. He graduated from Balıkesir University, Necatibey Faculty of Education, Physics-Chemistry and later worked as a physics teacher and a school principal. Later, he worked as the Head of Press for football club Yalovaspor. He was elected as president of the Atatürkist Thought Association, a secular organization that espouses the ideas of Mustafa Kemal Atatürk, the founder of modern Turkey. He is married to Ülkü İnce, with whom he has a son named Salih Arda.

== Politics ==
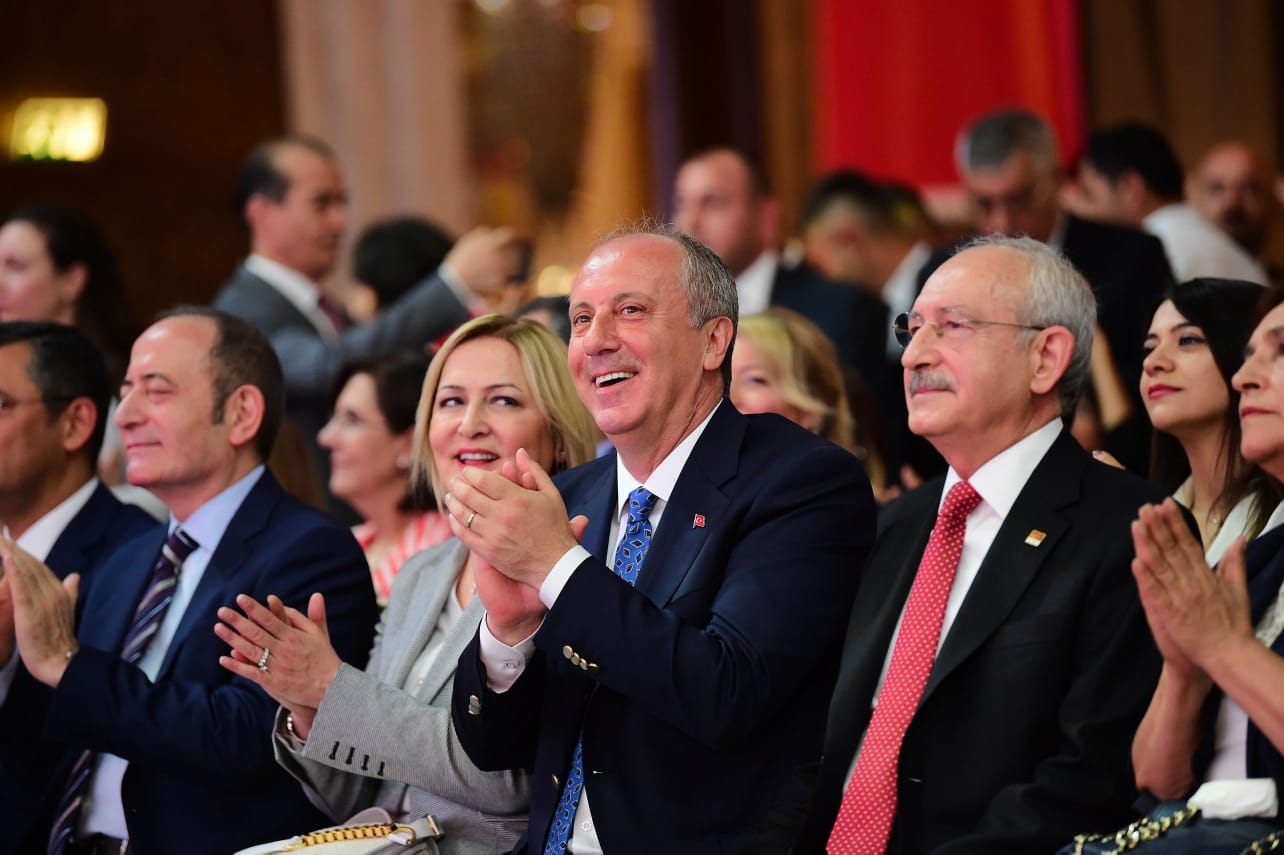
Muharrem İnce at the CHP manifesto launch, 26 May 2018.

İnce has been known in Turkish politics as one of the fiercest voices of the main opposition since 2002, against the ruling Justice and Development Party (Turkish: Adalet ve Kalkınma Partisi, abbreviated AKP) of Recep Tayyip Erdoğan. He became well known through his speeches which were widely shared on the internet .

Following the election of CHP parliamentary group leaders Kemal Kılıçdaroğlu and Hakkı Suha Okay as party leader and deputy leader respectively, İnce ran for group leadership and was elected with 58 votes. He was re-elected in 2011 and 2013 and before resigning in August 2014. He was replaced by Levent Gök. On 30 March 2014, Turkey held local elections, and the elections in Yalova were won narrowly by İnce's party, the CHP. However, the elections in Yalova were to be contested again. İnce played a crucial role in the process and the CHP's candidate, Vefa Salman, won the second election as well. On 18 August 2014, İnce declared his candidacy for CHP chairmanship but lost the scrutiny during the 18th Republican People's Party Extraordinary Convention in September 2014.

He once again stood against Kılıçdaroğlu for party leadership in the 36th CHP Ordinary Convention in February 2018, but his bid once again was unsuccessful. He received 447 votes from delegates, as opposed to Kılıçdaroğlu's 790 votes.

While he was a member of the CHP, he represented the nationalist wing.

İnce was revealed to be the presidential candidate of the Republican People's Party (CHP) on 3 May 2018. The following day, party leader Kemal Kılıçdaroğlu formally proclaimed the CHP's support for İnce and his candidacy was formally announced. Shortly thereafter, the CHP began preparations for the campaign season, launching the production of campaign materials and merchandise. It was revealed in early May that İnce's campaign would adopt the slogan “Türkiye’ye güvence Muharrem İnce”, roughly translating to "Muharrem İnce, an assurance to Turkey", and that it would be kicked off with an election rally in his home city of Yalova on 5 May.

President Erdoğan subsequently beat İnce in the first round of the presidential election, receiving 52.6% of votes. İnce received 30.64% of votes.

After the 37th CHP Ordinary Convention, it was claimed that İnce would be founding a new political party, called the National Party, in September. He founded his political platform named the Memleket Movement on September 4, 2020, while still being a member of the Republican People's Party. İnce announced his resignation from the Republican Peoples' Party on 31 January 2021, and formally resigned on 8 February of the same year.

In February 2023, İnce, announced that his party is discussing an electoral alliance with the Democratic Left Party, the Memleket Party, True Party and the Justice Party for the 2023 Turkish general election. On 6 March 2023, İnce left the 4-party alliance negotiations by sending a message to their WhatsApp group.

He withdrew from the presidential race on 11 May 2023.

== See also ==
- 2018 Muharrem İnce presidential campaign
