= Trials of Selahattin Demirtaş =

Selahattin Demirtaş is a politician of the Peoples Democratic Party (HDP) and faced several trials since he was arrested in November 2016. He was accused of having established and lead a terrorist organization, propagandizing for a terrorist organization, or being a leading member of the Kurdistan Workers Party (PKK). He was sentenced several times since, but two of them were overturned and the European Court of Human Rights (ECHR) ruled for his release. He faces trials for over a hundred charges and is threatened with a 142 years imprisonment.

== Trials in Turkey ==
=== Newroz speech trial ===
At the Newroz celebration of 2013 during the peace process between the PKK and Turkey, Selahattin Demirtaş and HDP MP Sırrı Süreyya Önder both held a speech. While Demirtaş was absent in the hearing of April 2018, Önder defended himself that the police has mistranslated his speech. For their speeches Demirtaş was sentenced to 4 years and 8 months for having praised the Abdullah Öcalan, the imprisoned leader of the PKK, while Önder was sentenced to 3 years and 6 months in the same trial in September 2018. In May 2020, the Court of Cassation overturned the verdict.

=== Main case ===
Demirtaş was arrested on the 4 November 2016 and held in pre-trial detention until his trial begun in December 2017 in the Sincan prison. In this trial, which comprises the 31 summaries of proceedings assembled during his tenure as a lawmaker in parliament, he is accused of various offenses like making terrorist propaganda, inciting hate and crime in public to being a leader of a terrorist organization. In the first hearing Demirtaş refused to take part over audiovisual communication and several international observers were not permitted into courtroom. In September 2019, a Turkish court ordered his release pending trial but the prosecution then demanded his re-arrest before he could be set free. He was then re-arrested for the Kobani trial.

=== The Kobanî trial ===
In the Kobanî trial he is prosecuted with other HDP politicians and accused for having caused the death of 37 people for him having supported the protests against the passive reaction of Turkey when the Islamic State (IS) besieged Kobani. In that case he argued in December 2022 that he can not be prosecuted for his speeches as they should be covered in the parliamentary immunity.

=== HDP closure case ===
On the 17 March 2021 the Turkish state prosecutor before the Court of Cassation Bekir Şahin filed a lawsuit before the Constitutional Court demanding the closure of the HDP and for him and 686 other HDP politicians a five-year ban to engage in politics.

=== Insulting the President ===
In March 2021, he was sentenced to 3 years and 6 months imprisonment for insulting the president for having said Recep Tayyip Erdogan “fluttered from corridor to corridor” attempting to get a picture with Vladimir Putin. The conviction came about a week after the HDP was indicted and threatened with a closure case.

=== Threatening an official ===
In May 2021, he was sentenced to 2 years and 6 months for threatening a counter terrorism official, Chief Prosecutor in Ankara Yüksel Kocaman. Demirtaş was accused of having said “I won’t let anyone get away with this, [we will] hold [him] to account.” The prosecution assumed he was alleging to a criminal organization but Demirtas answered that a court of law was meant. The next year on the 25 April, a court of appeals overturned the verdict.

=== Ahmet Davutoglu trial ===
In January 2022, Demirtas was sentenced to over 11 months imprisonment for having insulted the then prime minister Ahmet Davutoğlu during a rally in Mersin in 2016. In his defense he argued that his criticism of government officials should be seen within the freedom of thought.

=== Bîjî Serok Apo tweet ===
On the 1 April 2022, an investigation over a nine-year-old tweet containing Bîjî Serok Apo was initiated. The indictment says the expression is meant for the leader of the PKK, Abdullah Öcalan and demands a prison sentence of up to five years. The prosecutor in this case is the same as the one for the Kobanî trial.

== Trial before the European Court of Human Rights ==
In 2018 the European Court of Human Rights, in view of Demitas prolonged pre trial detention, saw it impertinent that he receives a speedy trial. In 2020 the ECHR ruled for his release, and deemed his prosecution as a violation of democratic rights.

In February 2022, Nacho Sánchez Amor criticized the Turkish judiciary for no their no-compliance with rulings of the ECHR in view of the continued imprisonment of Selahattin Demirtas but also Osman Kavala.

== Reactions ==
On 4 November 2016, the European Union expressed concern over Turkey's arrest of the co-chairs of the Peoples' Democratic Party (HDP), Selahattin Demirtaş and Figen Yüksekdağ, and other HDP politicians, and called on Turkey to immediately release Demirtaş, Yüksekdağ, and the other politicians. On 24 November 2016, the European Parliament unanimously adopted a resolution calling for the provisional suspension of accession negotiations between the EU and Turkey.
