= 2014 Kobanî protests =

Kurdish protests in Turkey

2014 Kobanî protests in Turkey
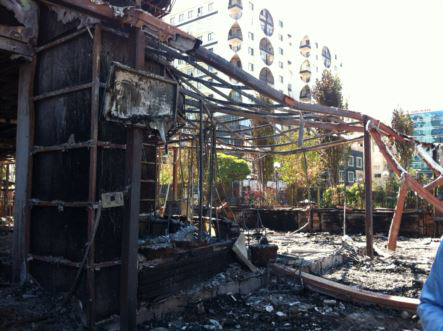
- Aftermath of the protests
- Date: October 6–8, 2014 (2 days)
- Location: Nationwide, mainly in southeastern Turkey
- Caused by: Siege of Kobanî, frustration with the Turkish government's response, regional tensions
- Goals: Protesting Turkey’s perceived inaction, solidarity with Kobanî defenders
- Methods: Demonstrations, protests, violent clashes with security forces
- Status: Quelled, protests ceased after a few days
- Result: Crackdown on protestors, several deaths, widespread damage

Parties
Protesters (pro-YPG and anti-isis supporters)	Government of Turkey, Turkish police, Gendarmerie, (Another groups HÜDA-PAR, Grey Wolves, Hizbullah), Political Parties (MHP, CHP)

Number
Thousands of protesters	

Casualties
- Deaths: 46
- Injuries: 682
- Arrested: 323
- Damage: Widespread destruction in multiple cities
- Buildings destroyed: Several burned or damaged, including government offices
- Detained: 1,974
- Charged: Over 200
- Tightened control on protests, further divisions between the Turkish government and Kurdish groups
- The protests were a response to the siege of Kobanî by ISIS and Turkey's perceived lack of support

The 2014 Kobanî protests in Turkey were large-scale rallies by pro-People's Defense Units (YPG) protestors in Turkey which occurred in autumn 2014 as a spillover of the crisis in Kobanî. Large demonstrations unfolded in Turkey, and quickly descended into violence between protesters and the Turkish police. Several military incidents between Turkish forces and militants of the Youth Wing of the Kurdistan Workers' Party (PKK) in south-eastern Turkey contributed to the escalation. Protests then spread to various cities in Turkey. Participants were met with tear gas and water cannons. 46 people were killed and 682 injured by the police and paramilitary groups over six days of protests between 7 and 12 October.

== Causes ==
As a result of the advance of the Islamic State (IS) on Kobanî that began 13 September 2014, more than 200,000 Syrians sought refuge in Turkey. On 30 September, errant shells landed on Turkish soil and the Turks shot back into Syrian territory, with Turkish armor being brought to the border to deter further incursions. Five civilians in Turkey were injured when a mortar hit their house. Turkey evacuated two villages as a precautionary measure. There were several causes for the protests. Turkish authorities forbidding Kurdish volunteers to cross the border into Kobanî was one, that Turkey refused to launch a military operation in defense of Kobani even though the Turkish parliament has passed a law authorizing one another.

However, Turkish security forces did not allow People's Protection Units (YPG) militants and other volunteers to go the other way, using tear gas and water cannons against them. While dispersing Kurdish crowds near the border, Turkish police fired tear gas directly into a BBC news crew van, breaking through the rear window and starting a small fire.

== Events ==
As a result of the crisis in Kobanî, massive pro-Kobanî demonstrations unfolded in Turkey and quickly turned into violence between protesters and the Turkish police. Several military incidents between Turkish forces and militants in south-eastern Turkey, contributed to the escalation. Protests then spread to various cities in Turkey, such as Mardin, Bingöl or Van in Eastern Anatolia but also to the western cities of Izmir and Istanbul.

=== October ===
On 7 October, Recep Tayyip Erdoğan said Kobanî would fall to ISIL, and the protests took up force. According to a witness' interview with Amnesty International the Justice and Development Party (AKP) led Municipality's bodyguards attacked protestors in Siirt on 7 October 2014. The same day, several members of the Hüda Par, including Yasin Börü, were killed in Bağlar, Diyarbakır. As a counter measure to the protests, the authorities in Mardin province imposed a curfew in several districts. On 8 October Mark Lowen from the BBC reported that 19 people had died and that the Turkish authorities imposed curfews in several cities with a majorly Kurdish population. Protesters across at least six cities of southeastern Turkey were met with tear gas and water cannons, and 13 people were killed on the first day of the protests. Over the six days from 7 to 12 October, 46 protesters (whose names were subsequently published by Turkey's Human Rights Association) died at the hands of the police, the Kurdish Hezbollah paramilitary group, and AKP-directed village guards, while 682 sustained injuries, 1,974 were detained and 323 among them arrested, with 38 reporting torture afterwards. The protests came to an end after Abdullah Öcalan called for their termination from his prison on Imrali island.

=== November ===
On 1 November 2014, multiple protests took place to support the Kurds of Kobanî. 5,000 people demonstrated in the Turkish town of Suruç, 10 kilometres (6.2 mi) from the border. At least 15,000 marched in Turkey's largest Kurdish-majority city of Diyarbakır and 1,000 protested in Istanbul, all peaceful. On 7 November, protests erupted over reports a 28-year-old Kurdish woman activist had been shot in the head by Turkish soldiers on the Turkish side of the border near Kobanî. She was reportedly part of a peaceful group of demonstrators who wanted the Turkish government to allow volunteers from Turkey to join the fight against ISIL in Kobanî.

=== Responses ===
President Recep Tayyip Erdoğan said that he was not ready to launch operations against ISIL in Syria unless it was also against the Syrian government.

== Legal prosecution of the protestors ==
Erdoğan has repeatedly blamed the Peoples Democratic Party (HDP) for the deaths during the Kobanî protests, whereas the HDP blamed Turkish police for the outbreak of violence.

Selahattin Demirtaş and Figen Yüksekdağ, Co-Chairs of the HDP in 2014, were arrested due to other charges in November 2016 but from September 2019 onwards, were also prosecuted for the Kobani protests. The prosecutors initiated the investigation against Demirtaş and Yüksekdağ the same day Demirtaş demanded his release due to a courts verdict, that he was to be released pending trial. In September 2020, the investigations were expanded onto the leading politicians of the HDP and the Democratic Regions Party (BDP) at the time of the protests. Sirri Süreyya Önder, and Ayhan Bilgen were detained on 25 September 2020. The prosecution of 82 supporters of the protests during September 2020, has led to other protests against the prosecution. During October, Sebahat Tuncel, Aysel Tuğluk and Gültan Kişanak, all imprisoned at the time, received new arrest warrants due to the protests. Gülser Yıldırım was also summoned to deliver a statement, following which she was released into house arrest. In the trial of Kişanak, secret witnesses had been used. The HDP has called several times for a parliamentary commission which would investigate the events causing the protests, but their demands were rejected by politicians of the AKP and their political ally the Nationalist Movement Party (MHP). Overall, 108 Kurdish politicians were put on trial in relation to the Kobanî protests.

In January 2021, the president of the MHP Devlet Bahçeli, called for the closure of the HDP due to its involvement in the Kobanî protests. On 2 March 2021, the Court of Cassation requested the case file regarding the Kobani protests and on 17 March the State Prosecutor of the Court of Cassation filed a lawsuit before the Constitutional Court demanding the closure of the HDP.

In May 2024, several HDP politicians were convicted, among them Demirtaş and Yüksekdağ who were sentenced to 42 and just over 30 years in prison, respectively.

== See also ==
- List of modern conflicts in the Middle East
- Kurds in Turkey
- Kurdish people
