= I Apologize campaign =

2008 online campaign in Turkey

"I Apologize" (Turkish: Özür Diliyorum) is an online campaign launched in December 2008 in Turkey by numerous journalists, politicians, and professors, calling for a collective apology for the Armenian genocide, which the campaign calls "the Great Catastrophe that Ottoman Armenians were subjected to in 1915." The campaign was launched by Prof. Ahmet İnsel, politician Baskın Oran, Dr. Cengiz Aktar, and journalist Ali Bayramoğlu. The campaign emphasizes regret on behalf of Turkey that Armenian requests for recognition of the 1915 genocide have been actively suppressed within Turkey. The campaign was signed by 5,000 people within the first 24 hours, and had collected over 30,000 signatories by January 2009. The campaign created widespread outrage in Turkish society.

== The campaign ==
The campaign is conducted online; the message that visitors are invited to sign states:

My conscience does not accept the insensitivity showed to and the denial of the Great Catastrophe that the Ottoman Armenians were subjected to in 1915. I reject this injustice and for my share, I empathize with the feelings and pain of my Armenian brothers. I apologize to them.

The campaigners emphasized that point that the initiative was not politically motivated but rather a personal and individual motivation.

The website has been translated into many different languages including Arabic, Armenian, English, Greek, and Russian. At last count, the campaign has over 32,000 signatures.

== Reactions ==
- Turkish Prime Minister Recep Tayyip Erdoğan has said: "I neither accept nor support this campaign. We did not commit a crime, therefore we do not need to apologise, it will not have any benefit other than stirring up trouble, disturbing our peace and undoing the steps which have been taken." "These Turkish intellectuals must have committed the genocide, since they are the ones who are apologizing."
- Nationalist Action Party (MHP), a Turkish ultranationalist party, issued a statement that stated: "There is no single page in the honorable history of the Turkish nation for which we should be embarrassed, and no crime for which we should apologize. No one has the right to smear our ancestors by deviating from history, declaring them guilty, and ask them to apologize."
  - Devlet Bahçeli, the leader of MHP, also stated: "No one has the right to insult our ancestors, to present them as criminals and to ask for an apology."
- Cemalettin Taşkıran was quoted as stating: "This is the biggest betrayal that could be shown to our forefathers.... The campaign was set up to hurt the unity of the Turkish nation and to prepare the way for Turkey's eventual recognition of Armenian claims of genocide."
- A group of sixty retired Turkish diplomats described the initiative as "unfair, wrong and unfavorable to national interests."
- Azerbaijani poet and National Assembly (Parliament) deputy Zelimhan Yakup, wrote a poem which was entitled "A Turk doesn't apologize to the enemy" (Turkish: Türk Yağıdan Özür Dilemez).

== Aftermath ==
The signatories received many death threats. Ece Temelkuran, one signer, claimed to have received 200 e-mails after signing, of which 150 were threats.

Turkey's Şişli 2nd Criminal Court Judge Hakkı Yalçınkaya ordered that the 'ozurdiliyoruz.com' site be shut down and the signatories punished under Article 301 of the Turkish Penal Code which makes it illegal to insult Turkey, the Turkish ethnicity, or Turkish government institutions.

== Notable signatories ==
Notable signatories of the campaign include:

- Adalet Ağaoğlu
- Akın Birdal
- Aslı Erdoğan
- Ayhan Bilgen
- Bengi Yıldız
- Cem Özdemir
- Coşkun Aral
- Enis Batur
- Eren Keskin
- Ertuğrul Kürkçü
- Esra Mungan
- Fatma Müge Gökçek
- Fethiye Çetin
- Ferhat Tunç
- Feridun Yazar
- Filiz Koçali
- Filiz Kerestecioğlu
- Halil Berktay
- Hasan Cemal
- Lale Akgün
- Leyla Zana
- Murat Belge
- Murathan Mungan
- Ömer Faruk Gergerlioğlu
- Orhan Kemal Cengiz
- Orhan Miroğlu
- Pınar Selek
- Selahattin Demirtaş
- Şerafettin Elçi
- Sezgin Tanrıkulu
- Sezai Temelli
- Sırri Sakık
- Tahir Elçi
- Ufuk Uras
- Yavuz Bingöl

== See also ==
- Armenian Genocide Remembrance Day
- Vergangenheitsbewältigung
- Insulting Turkishness
- National Sorry Day
