= Kars (electoral district) =

Electoral district for the Grand National Assembly of Turkey

Coordinates: 40°25′N 43°05′E

- electoral district for the Grand National Assembly of Turkey
- Kars shown within Turkey
- Province: Kars
- Electorate: 185.196

Current electoral district
- Created: 1920
- Seats: 3 Historical: 4 (1995-1999) 5 (1991-1995) 6 (1983-1991) 8 (1973-1983) 9 (1961-1973) 7 (1961-1969) 12 (1957-1961) 10 (1954-1957)
- MPs: List: Gülüstan Kılıç Koçyiğit DEM Party Adem Çalkin AK Party İnan Akgün Alp CHP
- Turnout at last election: 79.56%
- Representation
- DEM: 1 / 3
- AK Party: 1 / 3
- CHP: 1 / 3

Kars is an electoral district of the Grand National Assembly of Turkey. It elects three members of parliament (deputies) to represent the province of the same name for a four-year term by the D'Hondt method, a party-list proportional representation system.

== Members ==
Population reviews of each electoral district are conducted before each general election, which can lead to certain districts being granted a smaller or greater number of parliamentary seats. As a small electoral district, Kars's seat allocation has always been low. It was last reduced to three MPs in 1999.

MPs for Kars, 1999 onwards
Seat	1999 (21st parliament)	2002 (22nd parliament)	2007 (23rd parliament)	2011 (24th parliament)	June 2015 (25th parliament)	November 2015 (26th parliament)	2018 (27th parliament)
1	İlhan Aküzüm; Motherland	Zeki Karabayır; AK Party		Ahmet Arslan; AK Party	Mehmet Uçum; AK Party	Ahmet Arslan; AK Party	
2	Çetin Bilgir; DSP	Yusuf Selahattin Beyribey; AK Party	Mahmut Esat Güven; AK Party	Yunus Kılıç; AK Party	Ayhan Bilgen; HDP	Yusuf Selahattin Beyribey; AK Party	Yunus Kılıç; AK Party
3	Arslan Aydar; MHP	Selami Yiğit; CHP	Gürcan Dağdaş; MHP	Mülkiye Birtane; Independent (BDP)	Şafak Özanli; HDP	Ayhan Bilgen; HDP	

== General elections ==
=== 2011 ===
General Election 2011: Kars
Party	Candidate	Votes	%	±%
AK Party	2 elected 0: 1. Ahmet Arslan ✓; 2. Yunus Kılıç ✓; 3. Suat Doğan ✗	61,196	42.56	▲1.37
Independent	None elected ▲1: Mülkiye Birtane ✓	27,629	19.21	▲3.59
MHP	None elected ▼1: 1. 1. Umut Yılmazel ✗; 2. Harun Yenice ✗; 3. İrfan Topçu ✗	24,744	17.21	▼2.82
CHP	None elected: 1. Naif Alibeyoğlu ✗; 2. Cengiz Daşdemir ✗; 3. Saffet Özdemir ✗	24,009	16.70	▲3.32
Büyük Birlik	None elected: 1. Selaattin Yıldız ✗; 2. Muhittin Timur ✗; 3. Gürkan Işık ✗	1,647	1.15	▲1.15
DSP	None elected: 1. Serap Gençler ✗; 2. Müzeyyen Demirkaya ✗; 3. Erkan Tek ✗	1,027	0.71	N/A
HAS Party	None elected: 1. Mukayil Demir ✗; 2. Taner Çetin ✗; 3. Muhammet Ali Gökçek ✗	935	0.65	▲0.65
DP	None elected: 1. Erkan Güneş ✗; 2. Ekrem Polat ✗; 3. Gencay Aytaş ✗	683	0.47	▼3.60
SAADET	None elected: 1. Piyami Aksu ✗; 2. Mevlüt Ayçiçek ✗; 3. Süleyman Turan ✗	630	0.44	▼0.88
TKP	None elected: 1. İlhan Akalın ✗; 2. Emine Özmen ✗; 3. Banu Bedirman Soykan ✗	399	0.28	▼0.27
DYP	None elected: 1. Alaattin Yıldırım ✗; 2. Fatma Fidan ✗; 3. Hüseyin Ali Tıraş ✗	279	0.19	▲0.19
MP	None elected: 1. İsmail Can ✗; 2. Halit Şirin ✗; 3. İsmail Yiğit ✗	205	0.14	▲0.14
HEPAR	None elected: 1. Bora İzkübarlas ✗; 2. Cemal Gökce ✗; 3. Mahir Yeke ✗	178	0.12	▲0.12
Nationalist Conservative	None elected: 1. Serkan Ögel ✗; 2. İzzet Altun ✗; 3. Tuna Işık ✗	165	0.11	▲0.11
Liberal Democrat	None elected: 1. Harika Özovalı ✗; 2. Feride Dayanç ✗; 3. Zerin Şık ✗	107	0.07	▼0.18
Labour	No candidates	0	0.00	0.00
Total votes		143,791	100.00	
Rejected ballots		3,518	2.39	▲1.07
Turnout		146,953	79.28	▲5.95
AK Party hold Majority		33,567	23.34	▲2.19

=== June 2015 ===
Abbr.	Party	Votes	%
HDP	Peoples' Democratic Party	64,315	44%
AK Party	Justice and Development Party	38,950	26.6%
MHP	Nationalist Movement Party	20,507	14%
CHP	Republican People's Party	17,485	12%
	Other	4,930	3.4%
Total		146,187	
Turnout		81.25	
source: YSK

=== November 2015 ===
Abbr.	Party	Votes	%
AK Party	Justice and Development Party	50,267	35.6%
HDP	Peoples' Democratic Party	48,625	34.5%
CHP	Republican People's Party	21,315	15.1%
MHP	Nationalist Movement Party	17,579	12.5%
	Other	3,275	2.3%
Total		141,061	
Turnout		78.57	
source: YSK

=== 2018 ===
Abbr.	Party	Votes	%
AK Party	Justice and Development Party	52,791	36.9%
HDP	Peoples' Democratic Party	46,285	32.4%
CHP	Republican People's Party	20,207	14.1%
IYI	Good Party	10,597	7.4%
MHP	Nationalist Movement Party	10,145	7.1%
	Other	3,026	2.1%
Total		143,051	
Turnout		81.13	
source: YSK

=== 2023 ===
Abbr.	Party	Votes	%
YSGP	Party of Greens and the Left Future	40.710	27.6%
AK Party	Justice and Development Party	37.662	25.6%
CHP	Republican People's Party	24.090	16.3%
IYI	Good Party	21.728	14.7%
MHP	Nationalist Movement Party	14.211	9.6%
	Other	7.683	5.2%
Total		147.343	
Turnout		79.56%	
source: YSK

== Presidential elections ==
=== 2014 ===
Presidential Election 2014: Kars
Party	Candidate	Votes	%
AK Party	Recep Tayyip Erdoğan	53,350	42.52
HDP	Selahattin Demirtaş	41,266	32.89
Independent	Ekmeleddin İhsanoğlu	30,856	24.59
Total votes		125,472	100.00
Rejected ballots		1,775	1.39
Turnout		127,247	68.97
Recep Tayyip Erdoğan win			
