= Maxime Gauin =

French Armenian genocide denier

Maxime Gauin (born 9 April 1985 in Agen, France) is a French author and notable Armenian genocide denier who has written on the late Ottoman Empire, Turkish–Armenian relations and the Armenian genocide. He rejects the conclusion that the Ottoman mass deportations and killings of Armenians during the First World War constituted genocide, a position contrary to the scholarly consensus.

Gauin has worked for research organisations based in Turkey, including the Ankara-based Center for Eurasian Studies (AVİM). In 2019, Agence France-Presse described him as being funded by a Turkish think-tank. His writings have attracted strong criticism from historians, who have accused him of misrepresenting historical evidence, blaming Armenians for violence committed against them and attempting to discredit research on the genocide. Gauin was also cited in a 2021 French Senate report concerning foreign influence in academia, which identified him as known for his denial of the Armenian genocide.

== Education and career ==
Gauin studied history at the University of Bordeaux III and contemporary history at French higher-education institutions, including Paris 1 Panthéon-Sorbonne University and the École normale supérieure de Lyon. He later pursued graduate research at Middle East Technical University (METU) in Ankara. His doctoral dissertation, The Relations Between the French Republic and the Armenian Committees, from 1918 to 1923, was completed in February 2020 under the supervision of Ömer Turan.

Gauin worked at the Turkish International Strategic Research Organization (USAK) before joining the Ankara-based Center for Eurasian Studies where he became a scholar in residence in August 2012. His published work has appeared in academic journals and publications associated with Turkish research institutions. In March 2019, AFP described him as un chercheur français financé par un think tank turc ("a French researcher funded by a Turkish think tank").

== Views on the Armenian genocide ==
Gauin denies that the Ottoman government's deportations and mass killings of Armenians in 1915 amounted to genocide. During defamation proceedings in France in 2017, he acknowledged that he rejected the term genocide for the events of 1915. In an April 2020 interview, he attributed the deportations to security concerns, denied that the massacres were systematic and argued that Ottoman authorities had prosecuted some perpetrators. These arguments are at odds with the established scholarly understanding of the Armenian genocide.

Gauin has also challenged historian Taner Akçam over the interpretation of Ottoman documents, the role of Armenian armed resistance and the significance of postwar proceedings against Ottoman officials. His criticism of Akçam has itself been sharply criticised by other historians.

== Reception and criticism ==
=== Criticism by historians ===
Turkish political scientist Baskın Oran criticised Gauin's account of Turkish–Armenian relations in a December 2014 article for Agos. Oran challenged Gauin's portrayal of the Armenian government's ideology and accused him of disregarding the work of former Armenian presidential adviser Gerard Libaridian towards reconciliation with Turkey. After comparing Gauin's description of a conference exchange with a recording, Oran accused him of misrepresenting what had been said. He also argued that Gauin's opposition to reconciliation resembled that of Armenian nationalists opposed to rapprochement.

Turkish historian Edhem Eldem criticised Gauin's intervention in the dispute over the memoirs of Ottoman Armenian officer Sarkis Torossian. He condemned his attempt to use them to undermine Taner Akçam's wider research on the Armenian genocide. Eldem called this a "pseudo-scholarly shortcut" and argued that Gauin had helped turn a dispute over Torossian's memoirs into an attack on Akçam.

French historian Lionel Chanel criticised Gauin in February 2020 for his treatment of the Hamidian massacres, the Adana massacre and the defence of Van. Chanel accused him of blaming Armenian victims for the violence committed against them, distorting the significance of the The Memoirs of Naim Bey and misrepresenting the detention of Ottoman officials on Malta after the war. In particular, Chanel rejected Gauin's use of the abandonment of British prosecutions as evidence that the detainees were innocent.

German historian Volker Prott criticized the partisanship and selective interpretation of archival evidence among some "extreme" works over the Burning of Smyrna, specifically citing one of Gauin's articles as one of these works, and also stating that it advances the Turkish interpretation of the events which attributed the destruction of the city to alleged "Greek and Armenian arsonists". French historian Hervé Georgelin also cited Gauin as an example of a foreigner employed by Turkish institutions to support Turkish denialism.

In a 2025 study of Armenian-genocide denial on the internet, Armenian historian Bedross Der Matossian examined material published by the Turkish Coalition of America. He identified Gauin among the contributors to a collection of 89 articles on the Turkish–Armenian question that the organisation hosted.

=== Criticism by commentators and organisations ===
In April 2012, French journalist Guillaume Perrier discussed a forged report attributed to the French domestic intelligence agency DCRI in his Le Monde blog Au Fil du Bosphore, raising the possibility that Gauin had produced the document. Researcher Sam Hardy had also discussed the affair that month. A June 2013 post in Mediapart criticised Gauin's links with Turkish research organisations and questioned his correspondence with French counterterrorism judge Thierry Fragnoli. It also repeated speculation about Gauin's role in the forged DCRI report.

In 2015, Nouvelles d'Arménie Magazine published an article titled Le rôle et la méthode d'un négationniste (The role and methods of a denialist), accusing Gauin of promoting Armenian genocide denial, attempting to discredit historians who recognised the genocide and pursuing legal action against critics. The magazine compared his methods to those of Holocaust denier Robert Faurisson.

In November 2021, a statement published by Contretemps and signed by seven contributors, including Renaud Cornand and Philippe Huneman, described Gauin as "the most active of the denialist activists in Ankara's pay" ("le plus actif des militants négationnistes à la solde d'Ankara".

=== French Senate report ===
A September 2021 French Senate fact-finding mission investigating foreign influence in academia discussed think tanks that had promoted positions favourable to Turkey and circulated openly denialist arguments. The report cited Gauin, describing him as "known for his positions denying the Armenian genocide".

During the report's examination, Senator Nathalie Goulet called Gauin a pseudo-chercheur négationniste ("denialist pseudo-researcher"). Rapporteur André Gattolin agreed and proposed revising the passage to identify Gauin's denial of the Armenian genocide explicitly. The amendment was adopted, and the fact-finding mission unanimously approved the amended report.

=== Defamation proceedings ===
Gauin brought defamation and public-insult proceedings against Jean-Marc Toranian, director of Nouvelles d'Arménie and armenews.com, and Samuel Tilbian over statements published on the website. On 28 March 2019, the Court of Appeal of Paris rejected his civil claims, following the defendants' acquittal in the lower court.

== Bibliography ==
- Agence France-Presse (28 November 2017). "Pour la justice française, on peut dénoncer la négation du génocide arménien". Justice Info (in French). Agence France-Presse.
- Agence France-Presse (28 March 2019). "La négation du génocide arménien peut être dénoncée en France, confirme la justice". L'Orient-Le Jour (in French). Agence France-Presse.
- Azadi, Maxime (3 June 2013). "Dossier Kurde : un juge antiterroriste français mis en cause". Le Club de Mediapart (in French).
- Center for Eurasian Studies. "Maxime Gauin". Center for Eurasian Studies (AVİM).
- Chanel, Lionel (13 February 2020). "Génocide des Arméniens : l'historien turc Taner Akçam pulvérise les derniers arguments négationnistes". Conspiracy Watch (in French).
- Collectif (24 November 2021). "Contre Éric Zemmour en France comme en Arménie". Contretemps (in French). Signed by Renaud Cornand, Philippe Huneman, Razmig Keucheyan, Marie Sonnette-Manouguian, Sylvie Manouguian, Pierre Tevanian and Ani Tsovinar Vanetsyan.
- Cour d’appel de Paris (28 March 2019). "La cour d'appel de Paris déboute Maxime Gauin de ses demandes formées contre Jean-Marc Toranian et Samuel Tilbian, militants de la cause arménienne" (PDF) (Press release) (in French). Cour d'appel de Paris.
- Der Matossian, Bedross (2025). "Denial of the Armenian genocide in the Digital Age: Refashioning the "events of 1915" on the internet". Revue d'histoire de la Shoah (221): 273–310. doi:10.3917/rhsho.221.0273.
- Eldem, Edhem (2017). "A shameful debate? A critical reassessment of the 'Torossian debate'". Journal of Genocide Research. 19 (2): 258–273. doi:10.1080/14623528.2016.1262495.
- Erickson, Edward J., ed. (2019). A Global History of Relocation in Counterinsurgency Warfare. Bloomsbury Academic. ISBN 9781350062603.
- Gattolin, André (29 September 2021). Mieux protéger notre patrimoine scientifique et nos libertés académiques (Report) (in French). Sénat.
- Georgelin, Hervé (September 2022). The Kemalists’ Conquest of Smyrna September 1922: Targeting the Armenians First and Putting the Blame On Them (Conference presentation) (in English and Armenian). Yerevan: National and Kapodistrian University of Athens. slide 26.
- Hardy, Sam (5 April 2012). "Armenian nationalist forgery of French intelligence in order to discredit French denier of Armenian Genocide?". Conflict Antiquities.
- Nouvelles d’Arménie Magazine (2015). "Maxime Gauin: Le rôle et la méthode d'un négationniste" (PDF). Nouvelles d'Arménie Magazine (in French). No. 215. pp. 40–42.
- Oran, Baskın (26 December 2014). "Türk'ten fazla Türkçü olmak". Agos (in Turkish).
- Perrier, Guillaume (30 April 2012). "Retour sur l'affaire du faux rapport de la DCRI". Au Fil du Bosphore (in French). Le Monde.
- Prott, Volker (2025). "Destroying the Paris Order: The Fire of Smyrna as a Global Turning Point". In Giannakopoulos, Georgios; Maiolo, Joseph A.; Van Steen, Gonda (eds.). The War for Anatolia and the Remaking of International Order: Greece, Turkey and the End of the First World War. Bloomsbury Academic. pp. 11–30. ISBN 9781350420946.
