= Biji =

Bijî may refer to:

- Biji (soy pulp), a food
- Bijiguk (비지국), one of the historic small statelets that formed Silla
- Biji (Chinese literature)
- Biji - Punjabi word for Mom or grandmother
  - Biji, a character played by Kamlesh Gill in the 2012 Indian film Vicky Donor
- bijî - Kurdish word for "Long live" or "Viva" (Bijî Kurdistan meaning Long live Kurdistan)
