= Devran =

Devran is a Turkish given name. People named Devran include:

- Devran Ayhan (born 1978), Turkish footballer
- Devran Tanaçan (born 1986), Turkish basketball player

== See also ==
- Devran (book), a book by Selahattin Demirtaş
