= Devran (book) =

Book by Selahattin Demirtaş

Turkish edition

Devran is a book authored by the Kurdish politician Selahattin Demirtaş while he was in prison in Edirne, Turkey. In the book are included fourteen short stories, which focus on human rights of Kurds in Turkey. After Dawn, it is the second book of Demirtaş and was published in 2019 by İletişim Yayınları. It has a dedication to his parents who stood by their children for seventeen years while they were prosecuted or in prison.

== Impact ==
In January 2020, the book was included into a play by Jülide Kural during which artists read out stories included in the book. Opposition politicians like the mayor of Istanbul Ekrem Imamoğlu or the Party chair of the Republican Peoples Party (CHP), Kemal Kılıçdaroğlu also attended the play. In 2019, Turkish prosecutors classified the possession of the book as an evidence of being a member a terrorist organization claiming it was written to praise the Kurdistan Workers' Party (PKK). Despite the classification by the prosecution, the book is legally available in Turkey and can also be bought over Amazon. The book caused further turmoils in 2020, as Bülent Arınç, a prominent politician of the Justice and Development Party (AKP) advised the public society to read the book, which caused a condemning response by the Turkish president Recep Tayyip Erdogan calling Demirtaş a terrorist. From politicians of the far-right Nationalist Movement Party (MHP), Arınç was also criticized and asked if he receives a commission for his promotion of a PKK book. After a police investigation on HDP politicians in November 2021, Devran was displayed as a terrorism document together with other books of Demirtaş.
