= Socialist Party of the Oppressed =

Socialist Party of the Oppressed Ezilenlerin Sosyalist Partisi
- Kurdish name: Partiya Sosyalîst a Bindestan
- Leader: Hatice Deniz Aktaş; Murat Çepni
- Founder: Figen Yüksekdağ
- Founded: 29 January 2010
- Headquarters: Çankaya, Ankara
- Youth wing: Socialist Youth Associations Federation (SGDF)
- Membership (2026): ▼378
- Ideology: Communism; Marxism–Leninism; Hoxhaism; Anti-revisionism
- Political position: Far-left
- National affiliation: Peoples' Democratic Congress
- Colours: Red, White, Blue

Socialist Party of the Oppressed (Turkish: Ezilenlerin Sosyalist Partisi, ESP; Kurdish: Partiya Sosyalîst a Bindestan, PSB) is a Marxist-Leninist political party in the Republic of Turkey. It defines itself as "a militant revolutionary socialist party fighting for a workers'-labourers' federative republic in Turkey and Northern Kurdistan."

== Development ==
Some sources, including the public officials, hold the view that ESP is a legal front for the banned ICOR affiliate Marxist–Leninist Communist Party. Among its founders is Figen Yüksekdağ, the former co-president of the Peoples' Democratic Party.

The party is one of the participants in the Peoples' Democratic Congress, a political initiative instrumental in founding the Peoples' Democratic Party in 2012.

== Prosecution ==
In 2013 The Daily Telegraph called it "a small leftist group" after the homes of 90 ESP members were raided in connection with their involvement in the 2013 protests in Turkey. The Telegraph noted that "Police also searched the offices of the Atilim daily [Atılım] and the Etkin news agency, local media outlets linked to the ESP group, the NTV and CNN-Turk television stations reported."

== 2015 Bombing ==
The youth wing of the Socialist Party of the Oppressed, known as the Socialist Youth Associations Federation (SGDF), was the main target of the 2015 Suruç bombing. A group had travelled from Istanbul to Suruç on the Syrian border to assist in the reconstruction of the neighboring Syrian town of Kobanî after it was destroyed by warfare.

== See also ==
- List of anti-revisionist groups
