= Cengiz Aktar =

Turkish political scientist

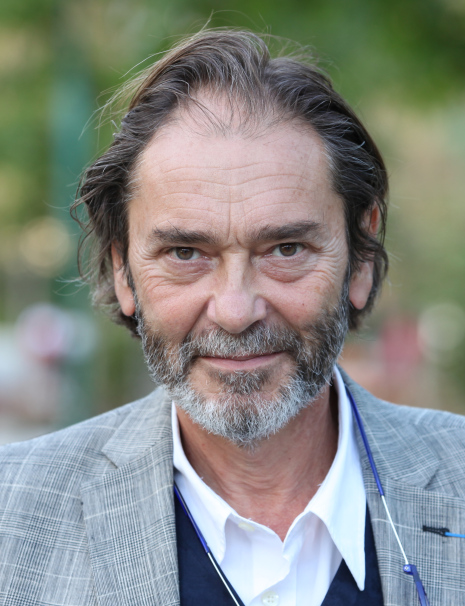
- Cengiz Aktar in 2015
- Born: June 2, 1955 (age 71); Istanbul, Turkey

Academic background
- Education: Sorbonne

Academic work
- Institutions: Université Galatasaray, Bahçeşehir University, University of Athens-EKPA
- Main interests: EU integration policies, Politics of memory regarding ethnic and religious minorities, History of political ideas 19th and 20th Centuries Ottoman Empire and Turkey, International refugee law

Cengiz Aktar (born 1955) is a Turkish political scientist, essayist and columnist. He has published numerous books on the European Union and its relations with Turkey. He was a director at the UNHCR and worked extensively with the European Commission. He initiated a campaign calling for an apology of the Turkish citizens towards the Armenians for the Armenian genocide.

== Biography ==
Born in Istanbul in 1955, Cengiz Aktar studied in the Lycée de Galatasaray then went on to study in the Sorbonne in Paris where he obtained a PhD in Economic Epistemology in 1982. He continued to collaborate with his PhD advisor, Alain Caillé within the framework of La Revue du MAUSS. Aktar has been nominated in 2010 Chevalier at the French Ordre du Mérite.

He is a professor of political science presently invited at the University of Athens [EKPA]. He is a former director at the United Nations, specializing in asylum policies. He is known to be one of the leading advocates of Turkey's integration into the EU. He was the Chair of European Studies at Bahçeşehir University. In 1999, he initiated a civil initiative for Istanbul's candidacy for the title of European Capital of Culture. Istanbul successfully held the title in 2010. He also headed the initiative called "European Movement 2002" which aimed at putting pressure on the lawmaker to speed up political reforms necessary to begin the negotiation phase with the EU. In December 2008, he developed the idea of an online apology campaign addressed to Armenians and supported by a number of Turkish intellectuals as well as over 32.454 citizens of Turkey. In February 2011 he coordinated the participation of Turkish visitors to Auschwitz-Birkenau within Aladdin Project. Upon return he developed the idea of Holocaust education for mid-level college students. The project run for three school years with ENKA schools in Istanbul.

Before Athens Aktar has been the Chair of European Union Studies in the Economic and Administrative Sciences Department of Bahçeşehir University. He also taught in the International Relations Department of Galatasaray University. He extensively wrote, taught and trained about the European Union and its relations with Turkey.

From 1989 to 1994, while working for the United Nations High Commissioner for Refugees he performed the duties of vice-director of the Informal Consultations consisting of Western countries, the IOM and the UNHCR. Later on the Informal Consultations went independent from the UN and became the International Center for Migration Policy Development, based in Vienna and headed by the late Jonas Widgren. From 1994 to 1999, he was the head of the United Nations's mission in Slovenia. His career within the United Nations spans 22 years.

Aktar collaborates with Açık Radyo, the longest-running community radio in Turkey since its inception in 1995, through his weekly "Nereye Doğru" (Where To) show, .

== The Apology campaign ==
Back in Turkey in 1999, he befriended the Turkish-Armenian journalist Hrant Dink who was running the Armenian-language periodical Agos. After Dink was assassinated on 19 January 2007, Cengiz Aktar, along with other Turkish scholars, decided to launch a petition calling for an apology of the Turks towards the Armenians. Aktar believes that Turkish public must take the responsibility of being further informed about the Armenian genocide. The petition read:

My conscience does not accept the insensitivity showed to and the denial of the Great Catastrophe that the Ottoman Armenians were subjected to in 1915. I reject this injustice and for my share, I empathize with the feelings and pain of my Armenian brothers and sisters. I apologize to them.

The campaign was named the I Apologize campaign and was signed by 32,454 people.

== Armenian Genocide and the Turkish malaise ==
For Aktar the unanswered, unaccounted crime of Armenian Genocide constitutes a fundamental syndrome for the Turkish malaise. As he elaborates in his latest book, ideologically speaking, the regime surfs on the predispositions of the social fabric that date back to the Armenian Genocide and other mass crimes. They grow in the webs of a social fabric poisoned by mass killings and plunders which were shielded by impunity and amnesia. Able to digest the horrors of the past, the social fabric can absorb much more. In a normal country, a regime which has violated countless times the laws and the Constitution, which has created an unprecedented institutional and social wreckage and continue to do so, should have been tried accordingly. Thanks to its culture of impunity, Turkey categorically lacks such modus operandi. Obviously, present day's unlawful political, economic and social practices appear trivial compared to past genocides, pogroms, mass killings and spoliations. Turkey looks like a museum of malicious acts, crimes that has never been questioned, whose perpetrators have always gotten away with what they had done.

Thus, irresponsibility, impunity, and amnesia over past crimes result in a ‘congenital’ contempt for the rule of law.

== Making sense of the Turkish regime ==
In his 2021 book The Turkish Malaise Aktar attempts to make sense of the present Turkish regime. For him authoritarianism is not sufficient to describe the regime which possesses historically unprecedented mass support. Downstream, at the level of its majoritarian base, the regime enjoys a degree of popular support unmatched in the history of the Republic. In truth, there are in parallels with authoritarian archetypes from the Ottoman Ittihadist era (1908-1918) and the time of the single-party system in the first decades of the Republic (1923-1946). However, for the first time, there is a massive support of the masses, one that the Ittihadists and Kemalists greatly lacked. Any in-depth analyses of this novelty, of its roots and sources of inspiration are still in their early days. They will certainly develop further as long as this regime exists.

The ‘masses’ aspect of Hannah Arendt's theory is, in fact, fundamental to the understanding of contemporary Turkish totalitarianism. To grasp the ‘Erdoğan phenomenon’ and the regime he has built brick by brick, one must consider the support of the masses alongside other factors such as his personality, his party, his wielding and dealing aficionados, the political history of Turkey, the fatal errors of the former elite as well as the current theoretical categorizations of authoritarian regimes.

Supporters of Erdoğan and his government are often described as a broad electoral constituency that he has referred to using terms such as the "national will" and the "blessed nation."Some commentators have characterised the relationship between this base, its leadership, and the governing ideology in critical terms. According to such commentary, much of the opposition, with the exception of left-wing Kurdish groups, aligns with the government on certain issues, including its military operations, its posture toward jihadist movements, its relationship with the Russian government, and its policies regarding Kurds.

== EU-Turkey relations: State of affairs ==
Regarding the future of the EU-Turkey relations, according to Aktar it is safe to say that in the history of the EU's enlargement, starting in 1973 with the accession of Denmark, Ireland, and the UK, the first spectacular failure is the candidacy of the Republic of Turkey. It is also safe to say that this missed opportunity is the making of a coalition of unwilling between the parties concerned. Finally, the consequences of the failure, although a tad early to conclude, could be likened to a lose–lose situation which goes well beyond the parties’ interests per se, to encompass Islam's synergy and coexistence with the rest of the world. As for Turkey, implications of the post-candidacy go beyond the simple consequences of a failed EU candidacy. By diverging from the EU path, the country consolidates and seals its de-Westernization drive to start sailing toward uncharted waters”. ±

As for the conceptual incompatibility between the EU and Turkey he underlines that from now on, it is inappropriate to bet on Turkey's EU (and eventually NATO) commitments to, for instance, ease tensions with neighbors as the failure of the EU membership bid cancels the achievements of last twenty years in terms of good neighborly relations with member states, particularly Greece. The actions of last years against a number of EU countries, politicians, and citizens are signals of this drive.

All things considered, Ankara's modus operandi contradicts EU's norms, standards, values and principles which simply constitute obstacles to the “smooth” functioning of the regime. Likewise this is why Ankara regime can never be reformed.

== Books ==
- Aktar, Cengiz (1986), L'occidentalisation de la turquie : essai critique, Paris: Éditions L'Harmattan, ISBN 9782858025701
- Aktar, Cengiz (2004), Lettres aux turco-sceptiques : La Turquie et l'Union européenne, Paris: Actes Sud, ISBN 978-2742752614
- Aktar, Cengiz (2010), L'Appel au Pardon, des Turcs s'adressent aux Arméniens, Paris: CNRS Éditions, ISBN 978-2271068484
- Aktar, Cengiz (2021), The Turkish Malaise, London: Transnational Press, ISBN 978-180135-0778
