= Başak Demirtaş =

Kurdish teacher in Turkey

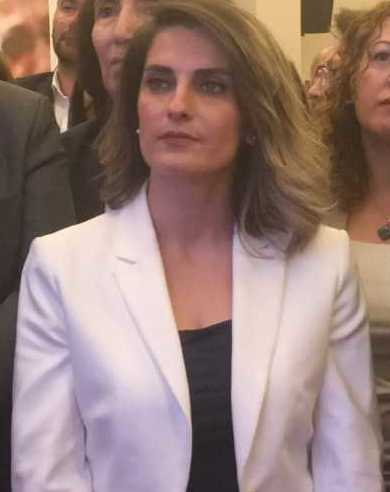
- Born: 1977 (age 48–49); Diyarbakır, Turkey
- Occupation: Teacher
- Spouse: Selahattin Demirtas (m. 2002)
- Children: 2

Başak Demirtaş (born 1977) is a Kurdish teacher from Turkey, author, and the wife of Selahattin Demirtaş, the former leader of the Peoples' Democratic Party (HDP), who she has been campaigning to get released from prison since 2016.

== Early life ==
Başak was born and raised in Diyarbakır to a Kurdish family.

She married Selahattin Demirtaş in 2002. Her husband is a leading democratic opposition leader in Turkey, active in social democratic, civil rights, and minorities rights parties. They have two daughters.

== Support of jailed husband ==
Talking about her husband's arrest by Turkish authorities on November 4, 2016. She told Cumhuriyet that it had reminded her of her own childhood: "They took my dad away in 1982. We were in Diyarbakır and the police also came in the middle of the night."

Başak Demirtaş travels regularly from Diyarbakır to Edirne in Turkey's North West to visit her husband. She told the BBC that she tried to be her husband's voice outside the prison during the 2018 Turkish Presidential election, in which he competed as the candidate for the HDP. On 6 June 2018, Selahattin Demirtaş made a campaign speech through his wife's phone from prison.

She met with the EU Rapporteur Kati Piri in 2018 to advocate for her husband's release. During the COVID-19 pandemic she campaigned for the inclusion of the political prisoners into a law which would release thousands of prisoners. She took part in the annual congress of the Progressive Alliance in 2019 in Stockholm, where she received an Award for Political Courage on behalf of her husband Selahattin Demirtaş. In June 2020, she was the target of a sexual threat from a Twitter account, which lead to a wave of solidarity from human rights activists and female politicians. In September 2020, she quit her job as a teacher due to the unpredictable nature of her visits to her husband due to the COVID-19 crisis.

== Trial ==
In November 2021, Demirtaş and her doctor were sentenced to two and half years in jail each, for an inaccurate health certificate. The defense claimed the relevant records, proving the medical examination occurred in the context of heavy medical complications following a pregnancy miscarriage, were not examined by the Turkish court and will appeal the judgment. The defense also claim this process is part of collective punishment and harassment of Turkish opposition.
