= Merve Büyüksaraç =

Miss Turkey of the year 2006

- Born: 13 June 1988 (age 36); Ankara, Turkey
- Education: TED Ankara College Foundation Schools; Yeditepe University
- Occupation: Model
- Years active: 2006–present

Merve Büyüksaraç (born 13 June 1988) is a model, TV personality and beauty pageant titleholder who won the Miss Turkey 2006. She is also an industrial designer by profession, a fine-arts artist and an entrepreneur. In 2016, Büyüksaraç has been put in trial in Turkey on the charge of insulting the president Recep Tayyip Erdoğan.

== Biography ==
Büyüksaraç was crowned Miss Turkey in 2006 and works as a model.

Büyüksaraç allegedly posted a satirical poem on Instagram in 2014 which was then shared thousands of times on social media, and prosecutors found the poem to be insulting. The trial in the city of Istanbul began in May 2016 and was decided at the end of the month. Her sentence was suspended on condition that she does not "reoffend" within the next five years. Her lawyers are appealing the verdict. Groups that support free speech have criticized the decision. According to a report in the BBC, 2000 people have been prosecuted for insulting Erdogan since 2014, and the list of persons charged includes children as well as celebrities. Büyüksarac reposted "The Master's Poem" in 2014 not for the purpose of insulting the president, she said, but because "it was funny". In June 2016, it was reported that she was delivered with a verdict of a suspended sentence of fourteen months imprisonment.
