= Mazlumder =

Turkish human rights association

The Association for Human Rights and Solidarity for the Oppressed (known as MAZLUMDER an abbreviation of its Turkish name: "İnsan Hakları ve Mazlumlar İçin Dayanışma Derneği") is a non-governmental human rights organization based in Turkey. It was established on 28 January 1991 by 54 lawyers, journalists, authors, publishers and businessmen.

== Background ==
While the Human Rights Foundation of Turkey (founded in 1990) was initiated by the Human Rights Association (founded in 1986), Mazlumder can be called a reaction to the main focus of these organizations on left-wing prisoners. Mazlumder is mostly known for its work on discrimination based on religious grounds. Problems arising from the wearing of headscarves by women in public positions or measures against officers in the army with alleged ties to religious sects are taken up by Mazlumder. The association counted 4,000 members in 1997. In 2008 the number of members was again given as 4,000.

Mazlumder carries out its activities with the help of membership subscriptions and donations made to the society. Its headquarters are in Istanbul. It has branches in Ankara, Istanbul, Adana, Adıyaman, Konya, Diyarbakır, Kayseri, Malatya, Ağrı and Mardin provinces. Mazlumder carries its activities through five administrative units, six commissions and various committees linked to the commissions. Chairpersons of the organization have been Yılmaz Ensaroğlu, Ayhan Bilgen, Halit Çelik and Ömer Faruk Gergerlioğlu, Ahmet Faruk Ünsal. The current chairperson is Ramazan Beyhan.

== Goals ==
As a civil society formation independent of any political or religious group or clique, Mazlumder primarily aims to generate a human rights perspective in Turkey, with the slogan "Against the oppressor whoever s/he is, on the side of the oppressed whoever s/he is".

The goals of Mazlumder are:

- Mazlumder considers all kinds of political, economic, social, legal, psychological, cultural and actual initiatives that limit human rights in a manner that is not in conformity with human dignity and the principles of justice as a human rights violation and "oppression".
- Mazlumder believes in the importance of the fight for human rights without discrimination as to who violates them and to fight against all kinds of ill-treatment, torture, denigration and rape.
- Malumder is against torture. It is an attack on the right to life and can by no means be legitimised.
- Mazlumder endorses the unlimited use of freedom of expression as long as it does not contain violence or insults.
- Mazlumder considers the right to belief as a basic right to be used parallel to the freedom of expression.

== Methods ==
Mazlumder addresses human rights issues in several ways:

- It investigates and reports on human rights issues to various authorities. Mazlumder perceives informing the public as the exercise of a right.
- Mazlumder produces various kinds of publications, including periodicals, books, bulletins and visual activities.
- Mazlumder organises seminars, conferences, panels, panel discussions, symposiums, competitions, exhibitions and other cultural activities such as films, video shows and plays.
- Mazlumder commissions experts and specialists to carry out research on social, cultural, economic and political areas, and surveys to reveal public opinion, and also to publish books including translation of books from foreign languages.
- Malzumder extends its financial, moral and legal supports without expecting anything in return to the people who were wronged or who are underprivileged through the violation of their human rights.

== Activities and persecution ==
Besides a large number of publications including annual reports as well as reports on specific incidents that members of Mazlumder (partly together with other organizations) researched Mazlumder and its branches have organized several campaigns. In many cities Mazlumder organized so called Platforms for the Freedom of Religion.

Like the Human Rights Association and the Human Rights Foundation of Turkey Mazlumder has also become a target for persecution. There have been trials against Mazlumder on allegation of "disseminating separatist propaganda" and in January 1999 the branch in Urfa (Kurdish area) and in June 1999 the branch in Malatya were closed down on governor's order. In June 1999 the Minister of the Interior asked all governor in 80 provinces of Turkey to search the headquarters and branches of Mazlumder. On 1 May 2003 a court in Turkey confirmed that Özkan Hoşhanlı, former chair of the local branch of Mazlumder in Malatya should be imprisoned for fifteen months for attempting to participate in demonstrations in April and May 1999 against the ban of headscarves. On 28 October 2003 he entered Yeşilyurt Prison.
