= Biji Kurdistan =

Kurdish slogan expressing patriotism

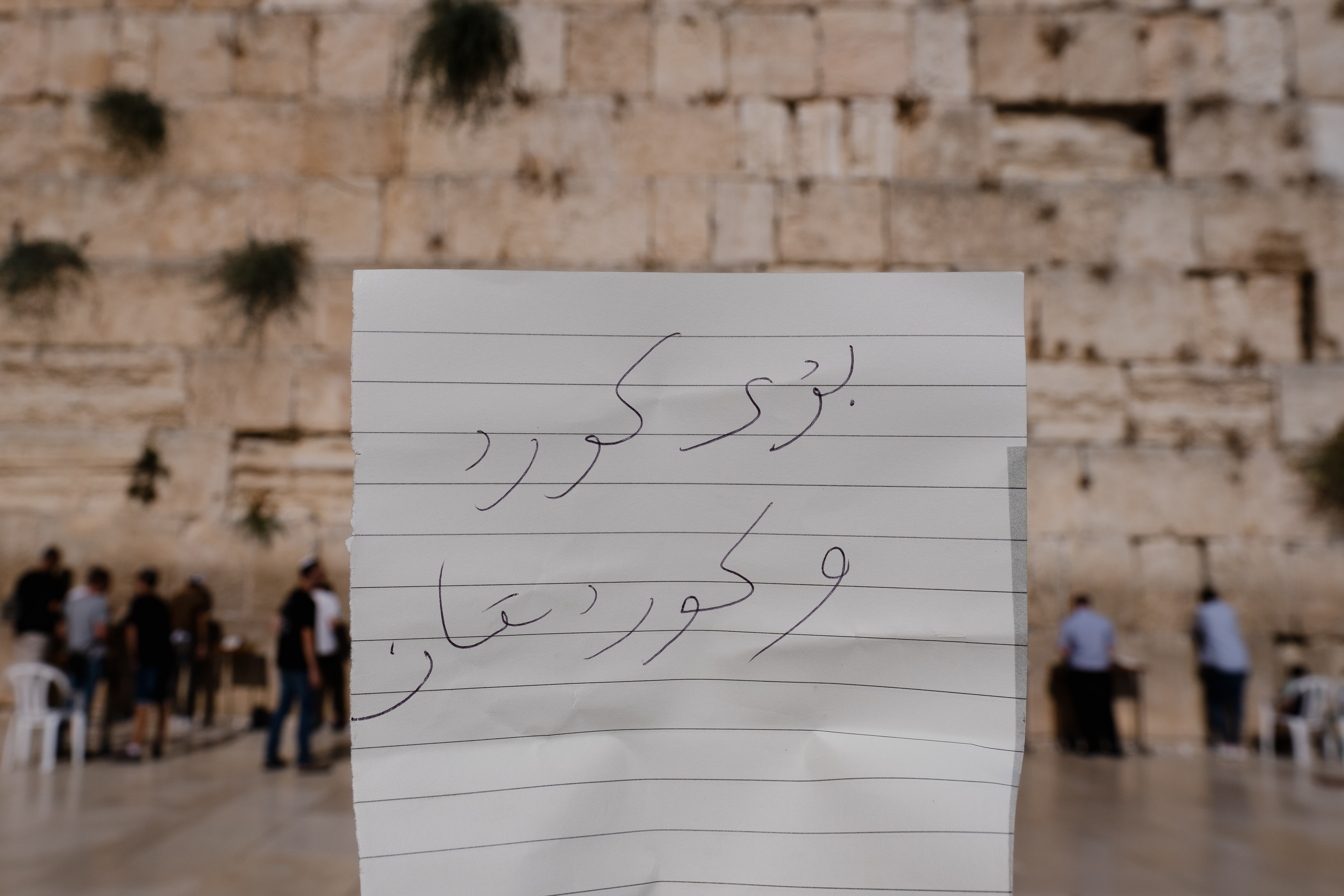
Biji Kurd u Kurdistan (Note: lit. 'Long live the Kurds and Kurdistan') on paper in front of the Western Wall, Jerusalem, Israel

Biji Kurdistan (Kurdish: بژی کوردستان, romanized: Bijî Kurdistan, Kurdish pronunciation: [ˈbɪʒɪ kuɾdɪsˈtɑn]; English: Long live Kurdistan) is a popular slogan expressing Kurdish patriotism and support for the independence of Kurdistan. The phrase is widely used in Kurdish nationalist and cultural movements.

Despite its Kurdish nationalist nature, the president of Iran, Ebrahim Raisi, shouted the phrase during his trip to Sanandaj in 2022. In Turkey, Its use has led to legal repercussions; in 2024, a Kurdish academic was detained for posting it online, and another was warned by a university for similar actions. Critics argue that criminalizing the slogan violates freedom of speech and stifles peaceful dialogue.

== Usage and significance ==
"Biji Kurdistan" is chanted during political rallies, festivals, and activism, symbolizing Kurdish unity and resistance. It is prominent in diaspora activism, such as weekly vigils in abroad demanding freedom for Abdullah Öcalan. The phrase gained additional significance during celebrations of Kurdish resistance against the Islamic State in 2014.

== Biji Serok Apo ==
Biji Serok Apo, is another form of 'Biji Kurdistan' that related to Abdullah Öcalan, the leader of the Kurdistan Workers' Party (PKK), which means "Long live leader Apo", and used by supporters of Abdullah Öcalan. Apo is an abbreviation for Abdullah, but it can also mean uncle. The slogan can lead to prosecution in Turkey and Germany. In 2024 the Turkish Constitutional Court ruled out that pro Kurdish nationalist slogans including Bijî Serok Apo are protected under freedom of speech laws.

=== History ===
Its origin can be traced back to a concert at the University of Cologne, Germany on 11 May 1984, when Koma Berxwedan gave a concert in support of the PKK. The party organ Serxwebûn reported that the crowd shouted Bijî Serok Apo at the end of the concert. Since then, it has become a common slogan for Kurdish political activists.

More recently, it was heard during a 2009 press conference in Batman, Turkey, where politicians of the Democratic Society Party (DTP) read a press statement on the 10th anniversary of the abduction of Abdullah Öcalan.

In 2014, it was shouted during a march against the terror designation of the PKK in Cologne, Germany. The phrase is also used by fighters of the Peoples' Defense Units (YPG). In 2016, the slogan was shouted at a Kurdish festival in Cologne, where 30,000 attendants and Die Linke politician Bernd Riexinger demanded Abdullah Öcalan's freedom, as well as peace negotiations. It has also been uttered during the annual Newroz celebrations in March, including in Diyarbakır and Istanbul.

=== Prosecution ===
==== Turkey ====
In Turkey, the slogan can lead to prison sentences and fines. The slogan is not prohibited per se, but is often viewed by the Turkish authorities as demonstrating support for the PKK. In 2009, two Kurds were sentenced to a fine of 500 and 600 Turkish lira after shouting the slogan during a press conference opposing the closure of the DTP. In December 2019, the European Court of Human Rights ruled that the slogan is protected by Article 10 of the European Convention on Human Rights, which concerns freedom of expression. In 2022, the former co-chair of the pro-Kurdish Peoples' Democratic Party (HDP), Selahattin Demirtas, was prosecuted for a tweet on 16 November 2013, in which he wrote Bijî Serok Apo. The slogan was also shouted during the July 2022 HDP congress in Ankara.

==== Germany ====
In Germany, the slogan is at times not protected by the freedom of expression. Depending on the police, use of the slogan is either investigated or permitted. Its shouting can lead to arrests and fines.

== See also ==
- Kurdish nationalism
- Woman, Life, Freedom
- Freedom of speech in Turkey
- Am Yisrael Chai
