= Ömer Faruk Gergerlioğlu =

Turkish doctor, politician, and human rights activist

Ömer Faruk Gergerlioğlu MP
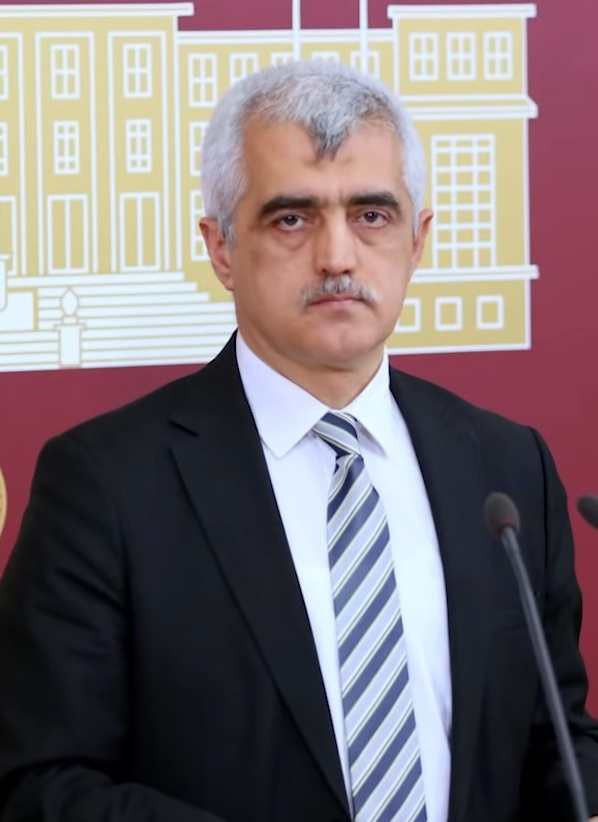
- Omer Faruk Gergerlioglu during an interview with Euronews

Member of the Grand National Assembly
- Incumbent
- Assumed office 16 July 2021
- In office 7 July 2018 – 17 March 2021
- Constituency: Kocaeli (2018, 2023)

Personal details
- Born: 2 November 1965 (age 60) Şarkikaraağaç, Isparta, Turkey
- Party: DEM Party (2023–present)
- Other political affiliations: HDP (2018–2023)
- Education: Anadolu University
- Occupation: Pulmonologist
- Website: Official Website

Ömer Faruk Gergerlioğlu (born 2 November 1965) is a Turkish medical doctor (pulmonologist), human rights activist and an MP (Member of the Turkish Grand National Assembly - TBMM) for the Peoples' Democratic Party (HDP). He has dedicated his political career to fighting against the human rights violations in Turkey.

== Early life and education ==
Of Turkish origin, Gergerlioğlu was born in Şarkikaraağaç. He completed his primary and schools education at the (Religious Vocational School) in Bursa, Turkey. In 1990, he graduated from the Medical School of the Anadolu University.

== Professional career ==
He began working at a Medical Center in Tecirli, Iğdır. His second stop was Orhaneli State Hospital, Bursa.

He was successful in the Expertise in Medical Science (TUS) in 1995. He completed his expertise training in pulmonology at Süreyyapaşa Pulmonology Hospital in 2000.

In 2005, he started working as a pulmonologist (with a focus on tuberculosis) at Seka State Hospital, Kocaeli.

He was suspended from public service due to one of the messages he shared on social media during the State of Emergency (OHAL), which was declared following the 15 July 2016, coup attempt in Turkey. He was purged from public service with a decree-law (KHK) no. 679, dated 6 January 2017. He is also banned from leaving country. Only after elected a being a Member of Parliament in the Parliamentary Elections in June 2018 he was able to travel abroad.

=== Other activities ===
He was active in the field of education between 2009 and 2015. He was the founding manager of a pre-school education institute. He was also the Kocaeli representative of an educational institution named Akil Oyunlari ('Mind Games' in English), which is focused on developing children's intelligence.

== Human Rights Career ==
Between 2003 and 2007, he assumed the presidency of the Kocaeli Branch of Association for Human Rights and Solidarity for the Oppressed (known as MAZLUMDER an abbreviation of its Turkish name: 'İnsan Hakları ve Mazlumlar İçin Dayanışma Derneği'). At the local level in Kocaeli, he led various activities from freedom of expression to women's rights. He pioneered drafting reports and organizing petitions. He initiated the 'Freedom to headscarf' campaign and oversaw it for years.

In 2007, the General Assembly of MAZLUMDER appointed him as the President at the national level. Despite the calls from the General Assembly to continue his function, Gergerlioglu decided to leave the presidency in 2009. He was one of the co-signatories of the I apologize campaign, in which several personalities of the Turkish-Kurdish society encouraged Turkey to take responsibility for their role regarding the massacres suffered by the Armenians.

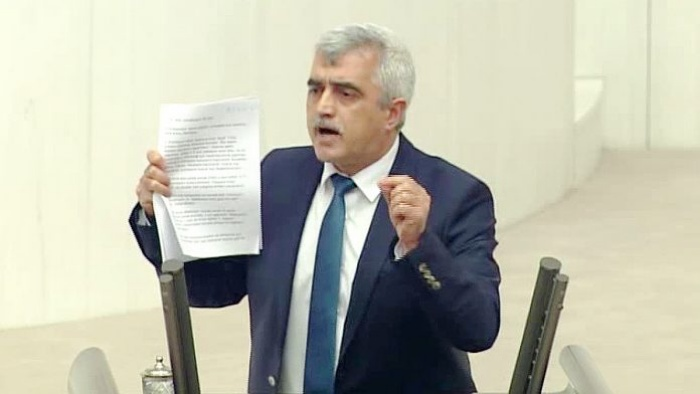
Gergerlioglu during a speech at the General Assembly of the Turkish Parliament

He became the spokesperson of Kocaeli Peace Platform (2013), which consisted of various NGOs that are active in Kocaeli, and the spokesperson of Rights and Justice Platform, which was founded in March 2017.

He attended countless human rights events both in Turkey and abroad, and organized various human rights campaigns, including drafting reports on specific issues. Since 2007, he has been writing about national and global political issues in local, national and international newspapers and websites. He has given countless interviews on websites and makes podcasts on human rights violations. He makes weekly broadcasts on Periscope named 'OFG TV'.

Gergerlioglu is a supporter of Kurdish rights. After Sur and Cizre operations, he and other human rights activists released a declaration criticizing excessive usage of force and human rights violations of security forces.

In the aftermath of the 15 July 2016, coup attempt in Turkey, he has been mainly focused on the legal and social effects of the State of Emergency (OHAL), particularly the decree-laws (KHK). He played the leading role in revealing torture cases (such as the case of tortured Turkish diplomats) and in bringing human rights tragedies to the public attention (such as the case of Ahmet Burhan Atac).

=== Examples of his activities ===
- He was the head researcher of the field study on 'Ethnic and Religious Discrimination in Turkey.

=== Examples of his articles and interviews ===
- 'Turkey's political prisoners at grave risk from COVID-19', Washington Examiner (11 May 2020).
- His interview about the bill on execution of sentences in Turkey, Al Arabiya (15 May 2020).

== Legal prosecution and controversies ==
On the 11 October 2016, an investigation against Gergerlioğlu was initiated for having shared an image on twitter in support of a Kurdish Turkish peace process, depicting mothers behind a symbolic coffin draped with a Turkish flag and another one with the flag of the Kurdistan Workers' Party. The image was taken during a manifestation of the Peace Mothers on the World Peace Day. On the 13 October, he was summoned by his superior at the state hospital in İzmit and suspended from his duties. Nacho Sánchez Amor, the current rapporteur for Turkey of the European Parliament, condemned the confirmation the sentence in February 2021. Gergerlioğlu is still able to appeal the verdict at the Constitutional Court.

In February 2018, Gergerlioğlu was sentenced to 2.5 years in prison after sharing an article on Twitter with the title "PKK: if the state takes the initiative, peace can be achieved within a month". The online newspaper who published the article, T24, was not prosecuted. Due to this conviction, Ömer Faruk Gergerlioğlu was stripped of his parliamentary membership on the 17 March 2021. Following he would not leave the building of the Turkish Parliament and initiated a so-called "Justice Watch" together with other Member of Parliaments from the HDP. The same day his Parliamentary immunity was revoked, the Turkish state prosecutor before the Court of Cassation Bekir Şahin filed a lawsuit before the Constitutional Court demanding for him and 686 other HDP politicians a five-year ban to engage in politics. The lawsuit was filed together with the request for a closure of the HDP due to the parties alleged organizational links with the PKK and its politicians role in terrorist activities. On 21 March 2021 in the morning he was detained by the Turkish police and dragged out of the Turkish Parliament. He was released shortly after he delivered testimony regarding him not leaving the Turkish Parliament while being expelled from it. On 2 April 2021 he was arrested. Hours later he was brought to hospital to get an emergency operation. After the operation he was brought out of intensive care and sent back to prison.

The Constitutional Court restored Gergerlioğlu's parliamentary membership on 1 July 2021, stating that his rights had been violated when he was convicted. He was released from jail on 6 July and the ruling of the court was read out in the Grand National Assembly on 16 July.

== Political career ==
At the parliamentary elections of 24 June 2018, he was elected to the Turkish Grand National Assembly (TBMM) representing Kocaeli for the People's Democratic Party (HDP). He is a member of the Parliamentary Commission of Human Rights Inquiry. He draws attention to human rights violations and campaigns to improve the rights of Kurds, prisoners and people who have been purged after July 15, 2016 coup attempt. In January 2018, he signed a petition against Turkey's Operation Olive Branch against Afrin, Syria.

=== 2021-present ===
After his2021 reinstatement, the HDP faced a closure before the Constitutional Court and contested the May 2023 general election under a different banner the Green Left Party (Yeşil Sol Parti/YSP), rather than losing it parliament seats to a ban - a pattern several other HDP aligned deputies followed too. The HDP faced closure by the Constitutional Court and decided to contest the 2023 election under the Green Left Party banner.

The ruling AKP challenged his eligibility to the Supreme Election Council (YSK), citing his 2018 prison sentence, but the YSK rejected the objection in May 2023. He subsequently became a founding member of the DEM Party (Peoples' Equality and Democracy Party), the party that absorbed most of the HDP/Green Left political network. Since 2023 he's remained active on human rights issues from DEM benches, he submitted a parliamentary proposal calling for a ban on Turkey's trade with Israel, over the Gaza war in April 2024; he warned in parliament in mid 2024 that rising anti-Syrian-refugee violence risked echoing the 1955 Istanbul pogrom; and he was expelled from a courtroom in early 2025 after criticizing a judges questioning of minors on terrorism charges.

== Honors and prizes ==
- The Intellectual of the Year Award by Feta Initiative and Sakarya Voluntary Educators Association (2013)
- Selected as the 'Person of the Year (2019)' by the Ahval News
