= Kobani trial =

Ongoing legal trial in Turkey

The Kobani trial (Turkish: Kobani Davası, Kurdish: Doza Kobanî) is a politically motivated trial against hundreds of pro-Kurdish politicians and human rights activists, especially against high-ranking members of the Peoples Democratic Party (HDP). The trial is related to the events from Kobanê in October 2014. Officially, the defendants are accused of being members of a terrorist organization and of endangering the “unity and territorial integrity of the state.” In fact, intellectuals and outsiders interpret this process as an act of revenge by the AKP government against its political, pro-Kurdish opponents.

== Background ==
A total of 108 HDP members are on trial in the Kobanî trial. This is about the protests in autumn 2014 that took place in many Kurdish cities in Turkey against the dramatic situation in the Syrian city of Kobanî. The city, which is located directly on the border with Turkey and is predominantly inhabited by Kurds, was besieged by the Islamic State (IS) from September 2014. This triggered large flows of refugees into Turkey. About 200'000 refugees entered Turkey from Syria. In a speech, the Turkish president Erdogan announced the fall of Kobanî while the Kurdish city remained heavily contested. Kurdish YPG militias were fighting against the invasion of IS troops there. Not satisfied with the approach to the siege by the Turkish Government, the HDP called for protests against an eventual massacre in Kobani. The protests were met with counter protests of the Free Cause Party. The HDP has demanded an investigation into the protests in the Grand National Assembly of Turkey, but their requests were denied.

== Investigation ==
The legal investigation began in 2014, but it was only in 2019 when the former Co-Chairs of the HDP Selahattin Demirtas and Figan Yüksekdag were questioned. In September 2021 against several HDP politicians like the mayor of Kars Ayhan Bilgen, or the MPs Sırri Süreyya Önder and Ayla Akat Ata was ordered pre-trial detention. In October the same year, the investigation was expanded to the imprisoned former MPs of the BDP Sebahat Tuncel, Aysel Tugluk and Gültan Kısanak. The indictment was presented on the 30 December 2021, after the European Court of Human Rights ordered the release of Demirtas on the 22 December 2021. In April 2022 the prosecution expanded the investigation into the financial aspects of the Kobani protests and issued arrest warrants for HDP politicians for providing financial support to people affected by the protests.

=== Indictment ===
On the 30 December 2020 the prosecution presented an indictment of more than 3500 pages to a court in Ankara in which they charged 108 politicians of the HDP. On the 7 January the court accepted the indictment. The same month and based on this indictment, Devlet Bahçeli of the Nationalist Movement Party (MHP) demanded the closure of the HDP. Other prominent defendants (beside the mentioned above) are Ahmet Türk, Emine Ayna, Ertugrul Kürkcü, Gülser Yildirim, Yurdusev Özsökmenler and Hatip Dicle.

== Trial ==
=== April – November 2021 ===
In the first day of the trial on the 26 April, the lawyers of the defense walked out of the court room and the defendants refused to answer questions because some lawyers were not permitted to be present at the hearing.

The second hearing took place on the 18 May. Demirtas questioned the fact that an indictment of over 3500 pages was able to be examined and accepted within less than ten days or how a politician of the Nationalist Movement Party (MHP) was able to tweet about the proceedings of the court before the HDP or the press knew about them. The HDP Co-chair during the protests Figen Yüksekdag assumed the prosecution had mixed up names, because a speech of Kamuran Yüksek was included into the case-file like one she gave herself.

In the third hearing on 15 June, the court ordered the release pending trial to four defendants including the former mayor of Kars, Ayhan Bilgen. The three others were members of the executive council of the HDP at the time of the protests. One of them had shared two social media posts on Facebook. One was about Selahattin Demirtas and the other one was about a man who lamented his son was killed in service of the Peoples' Defense Units (YPG).

In the fourth hearing, several HDP politicians questioned the evidence presented against them which were an incoming email from the Democratic Union Party (PYD) in Syria asking for help against the Islamic State, being present at an event of an election campaign ones coming from secret witnesses.

In the fifth hearing the court ruled there would be no release for any of the imprisoned defendants. The lawyers of the defense criticized that tweets already examined and approved as a lying within the human right of liberty of expression by the European Court of Human Rights where included in the case file and demanded longer intervals between the hearings.

In the sixth hearing on the 8 November a new presiding judge replaced Bahtiyar Çolak, who had been dismissed after having felt unwell due to COVID-19. The dismissal was criticized by the defendants' lawyers who following stated they would not attend further hearings of the trial as the process was unlawful and the seventh hearing took five minutes as the lawyers and defendants boycotted the trial.

=== February - April 2022 ===
On the ninth hearing twelve imprisoned plaintiffs against the HDP politicians withdrew their former declarations in which they pressed charges against them.

In the eleventh hearing of April 2022 a witness declared the statement he signed before a prosecutor in Antalya does not represent what he said at the time and that in Kobani people defended their democratic rights.
