= Torture of former Turkish diplomats, 2019 =

The Ankara Bar Association (ABA) reported that some former Turkish diplomats were tortured in custody in May 2019.

== History ==
On May 20, 2019, Ankara police launched an operation to arrest 249 former diplomats whose 78 of them were caught. According to police statement, the reason was an investigation about irregularities in the Turkish Ministry of Foreign Affairs’ entrance exams in 2010, 2011, 2012 and 2013.

On May 26, a Turkish MP, Ömer Faruk Gergerlioğlu, who focuses on human rights issues in Turkey, tweeted about the torture allegations. Upon this tweet and other reports of illegalities from lawyers, the Ankara Bar Association put the issue on its agenda. A group of lawyers from the Association visited Ankara police headquarter and made several interviews with 6 of detainees. All of them verified that when the security officers took them to make ‘interviews,’ they were forced to be repentant under psychological pressure, threatened and verbally insulted. On top of them, 5 of them said that they suffered torture and maltreatment.

According to detainees’ testimonies, they were brought to a dark room in the Financial Crimes Department of Ankara police. The police officers left them in the room with other officials, who introduced themselves as a ‘professional team’. The detainees were forced crawl on the floor blindfoldedly. “After one midnight, police officers took me and my colleagues from the cell. Dragging us by our arms, we entered a dark corridor. We were handcuffed behind our backs and blindfolded with pieces of fabric. They covered our faces with a plastic bag so we couldn’t see their faces,” Fox News quoted from a former diplomat. "All the while, they threatened and insulted us to force us into 'confessing'."

ABA's lawyers noted that they could see the bruises on the victims' knees.

During these sessions, the interrogators stripped four of detainees from their clothes, hit them with truncheons and touched truncheons on their body while threatening them with rape. “Some of them were raped with truncheons. Some others were threatened with oiled truncheon which was touched to their rectum area. After these tortures, one person said that he was going to sign whatever they want to benefit from repentance [law]. Rest of the detainees were told that ‘You have time until Friday. If you do not talk, we will do everything to you’,” said one of the lawyers of the detainees. The interviewees said that there were other detainees who suffered torture in Ankara police. According to lawyers, 20 detainees were tortured in similar ways, and 10-15 people accepted to sign the statement of repentance.

Ankara Bar Association’s report also stated that the judge, other police officers and the doctor, who examined detainees, ignored the complaints of torture.

The security officers asked them to give false statement, which was accepting the test irregularities, stated Gergerlioğlu.

On the other hand, the police rejected these allegations, saying that they were conducting the investigation lawfully. A Turkish official from the Ministry of Foreign Affairs reminded that "

== Accusations ==
According to the accusations, the suspects entered the Ministry of Foreign Affairs by obtaining exam questions beforehand in years 2010, 2011, 2012 and 2013. The expert report wrote that there were significant similarities between different test papers – which were thought as an proof of fraud. Some candidates used same phrases in their papers, the report highlighted.

In response, the former diplomat, who anonymously talked to Fox News, rejected these accusations, saying that since the papers were destroyed, it is not even possible to acquit themselves.

One of the defense lawyers argued that the investigation was empty. "This investigation consists of the similarities in the candidates’ answers," the lawyer said and added that "In 2010 test, it was asked a question like 'which are the countries that Turkey care about most?' It was the popular discussion in 2010, and therefore it was predictable question. As a source, people studied the articles in the Ministry's official website and Ahmet Davutoglu's speeches, all memorized these."

"Because of this reason, the investigation is empty. In order to get statement through repentance, they use torture."

A former ambassador who served as an examiner told to al-Monitor that “Our board of examiners determines the questions on the same day of the exam precisely to prevent any mischief.”

Another former diplomat, M. Bahadır Gülle, argued that it was almost impossible to cheat in those four-step tests without caught since in the last phase the candidates were interviewed by a group of ambassadors. “If this allegation were at all sincere, these ambassadors would have to be questioned first. They would have to be in on it. But the ambassadors continue to hold important posts — their role in this alleged scheme goes unmentioned,” wrote Gülle in his article.

== Aftermath ==
The report and torture allegations had a broad repercussion in the Turkish and International media. The MPs Ömer Faruk Gergerlioğlu from the Peoples Democratic Party (HDP) and Sezgin Tanrıkulu of the Republican People's Party (CHP) submitted parliamentary questions regarding the incident to be answered by Deputy President Fuat Oktay. Tanrıkulu asked the truthfulness of the allegations about the Turkish intelligence officers’ torture on former diplomats.

On the other hand, UN special rapporteurs asked more information about the allegations and the Turkish government's measures. The government rejected allegations in its response.
