= Ayhan Bilgen =

Turkish politician

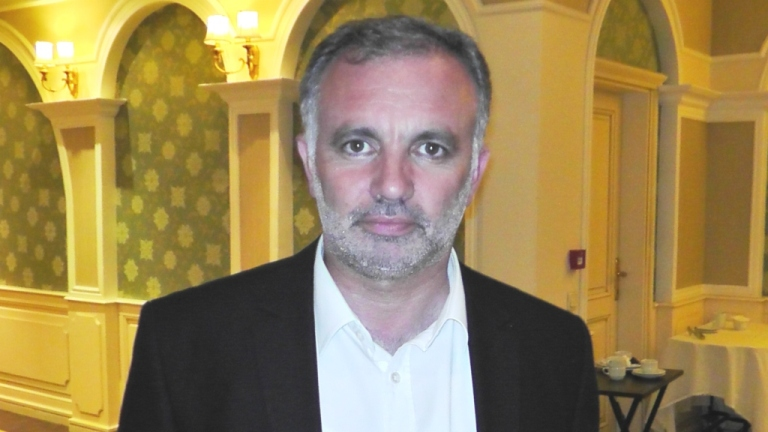
- Ayhan Bilgen (2017)

Mayor of Kars
- In office 8 April 2019 – 2 October 2020
- Preceded by: Murtaza Karaçanta
- Succeeded by: Türker Öksüz

Member of the Grand National Assembly
- In office 23 June 2015 – 8 April 2019
- Constituency: Kars (June 2015, Nov 2015, 2018)

Personal details
- Born: 28 January 1971 (age 55) Sarıkamış, Kars, Turkey
- Party: Peoples' Democratic Party (until 2021)
- Children: 2
- Education: Ankara University (BA); Hacettepe University (MA)
- Website: Personal website

Ayhan Bilgen (born 28 January 1971, Sarıkamış, Kars Province) is a journalist, politician and former mayor of Kars from the Peoples' Democratic Party.

== Early life and education ==
Bilgen studied political sciences at the Ankara University and sociology at the Hacettepe University, also in Ankara.

In 2006, Bilgen was engaged in the Turkish Human Rights association Mazlumder in which activity he opposed the new Anti-Terror bill by the Turkish Government as it limited the freedom of expression. In the same year he was elected as its chairman, and he kept the post for two years. In 2011 the newspaper he was the editor in chief of, Günlük, was closed by the Turkish authorities due to suspected support of the Kurdistan Workers' Party (PKK). He was also a columnist for the newspapers Özgür Gündem and Evrensel.

== Political career ==
He was elected to the Turkish parliament for Kars as a representative for the HDP in the general election of June 2015, and again the snap elections of November 2015. He supported the defense of Kobani against the Islamic State of Iraq and Levant (ISIL) in Kobani and was prosecuted for taking part in manifestations in October 2014 during the Siege of Kobani. He was arrested in spring 2017 and released in September of the same year. During his parliamentary career he advocated for Human Rights, Kurdish rights and the protection of the environment. In the local elections of March 2019 he was elected the Mayor of Kars. In May 2020, after several Municipalities won by the HDP were put under the authority of state appointed trustees, Bilgen received the support from dozens of human rights organization. On 2 October 2020, he was formally arrested and deposed as Mayor of Kars and replaced by a government-appointed trustee, the governor of Kars Province, Eyüp Tepe. He announced his resignation from his party, HDP, on 13 December 2021. He founded a new political party in 2022.

=== Legal prosecution ===
On 25 September 2020, he was detained together with several prominent HDP politicians like former deputies Sırrı Sureyya Önder and Ayla Akat Ata due to the Kobani protests which were held in support of the Kurdish population in the Syrian town of Kobani in 2014, which was then besieged by the Islamic State of Iraq and the Levant (ISIL). After he was arrested in October 2020, he was transferred to the Ankara Sincan prison. He was found not guilty of terrorism related charges in the Özgür Gündem trial on the 15 October 2020. On the 17 March 2021 the Turkish state prosecutor before the Court of Cassation Bekir Şahin filed a lawsuit before the Constitutional Court demanding for him and 686 other HDP politicians a five-year ban to engage in politics. In June 2021, he was released following the third hearing of the Kobani trial.
