= Dawn (Demirtaş book) =

2017 book by Selahattin Demirtaş

First edition (publ. Dipnot Yayınevi)

Dawn (Turkish: Seher) is a book authored by Selahattin Demirtaş, a Kurdish politician of the Peoples' Democratic Party (HDP) and written while he was in the F-Type prison in Edirne. The cover was designed by his sister Bahar Demirtaş and the book released in September 2017. The Turkish edition has reportedly sold more than 200,000 copies.

The book contains twelve short stories on 144 pages and is described to be directed to the working class and dedicated to the female victims of violence. Demirtas also included two drawings by himself in the volume. The stories were developed during months and written by night, before dawn.

The English rights for the book were bought by Sarah Jessica Parker, who published it under the title Dawn: Stories. It was released on April 23, 2019, under Parker's imprint SJP for Hogarth Press. It was translated by Amy Marie Spangler and Kate Ferguson. So far, it has been translated into 8 languages.

In Germany, the book was received with praise by the German public society. Parts of it were read out by the journalist Deniz Yücel, who previously was in imprisoned in Turkey and Cem Özdemir, a politician of The Greens.

== Awards ==
- PEN International "Translates Award" to the book in 2018.
- Montluc Resistance and Liberty Prize of the Emmanuelle Collas publishing house in 2017. As two people wanted to deliver the award in person and come to Turkey, the Turkish authorities didn't permit the entrance to Turkey to one of the two delegates. The authorities also prevented them of seeing their lawyers at the airport in Istanbul arguing that "The Airport is new"
