= Baskın Oran =

Turkish political scientist

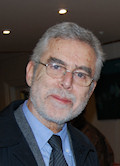
- Professor Baskin Oran, 2008

Human Rights Activist

Personal details
- Born: 26 July 1945 (age 80) İzmir, Turkey
- Profession: Academician

Baskın Oran (born 26 July 1945) is a Turkish academic, politician and human rights activist. Currently, he is a teacher in Faculty of Political Science, Ankara University.

== Biography ==
Baskın Oran was born on 26 July 1945 in İzmir. He finished the high school in Turkey. He attended high school Saint-Joseph, which explains his Francophonie then İzmir Atatürk High School. He then entered Ankara University and studied for Political Science. He graduated in 1968. Later in 1969, he started his academic career as a teaching assistant in the Department of International Relations.

In 1971, following the coup, he was suspended for the first time from his post and was reinstated by the Council of State (Danıştay) in 1972. He completed his doctorate in 1974. He continued his studies and by 1975 he finished his postdoctoral in Geneva on international minorities.

In 1982, when he was an assistant professor, he was again suspended from docent by 1980 Turkish coup d'état. He was not reinstated until 1990 by court order. In 1991, he was appointed Senior Lecturer in the Department of International Relations and, finally, in 1997, he received the title of professor.

At the university he taught and worked on subjects of minorities, nationalism, globalization, Turkish foreign policy and relations between State and religion. He was officially retired in 2007 but continued teaching at the Faculty of Political Science of Ankara University as well as giving lectures and courses at foreign universities.

Meanwhile, he started writing for Turkish newspapers, He was an editorialist in the daily Birgün from 2004 to 2006, Radikal 2. since February 2000 he has also been writing for the bilingual weekly – Turkish and Armenian – Agos, newspaper, founded byhis publisher friend, Hrant Dink. who was the founder and the director of publication He also worked for Büyük Meclis magazines and newspapers (La Grande Assemblée), (New Daily), Ikibin'e doğru (Around 2000), Tempo, Aydınlık (Clarity) from 1985 to the year 2000.

Since 2003, he has been Chair of the Subcommittee on Cultural rights and Minority rights of the Human Rights Advisory Council attached to the Ministry of Human Rights. A publication in 2004 of a controversial report earned him and Professor Ibrahim Kaboğlu judicial and death threats from ultra-nationalist groups.

On 1 June 2007, he participated in the parliamentary elections in the second Istanbul constituency in the platform list of the Collective of Independent Candidates (Ortak Bağımsız Aday Platformu).

== Journalism activity ==
Meanwhile, he started writing for Turkish newspapers, He was an editorial writer in the daily Birgün from 2004 to 2006, Radikal 2. since February 2000 he has also been writing for the bilingual weekly – Turkish and Armenian – Agos, newspaper, founded byhis publisher friend, Hrant Dink. Buskin also wrote for magazines and newspapers Büyük Meclis (The Grand Assembly) Yeni Gündem (New Daily), Ikibin'e doğru (Around 2000), Tempo, Aydınlık (Clarity) from 1985 to the year 2000.

== A committed personality ==
Baskın Oran is "National Liaison Officer" for Turkey to the Commission against Racism and intolerance of the Council of Europe. On 15 December 2008, Baskin Oran with Ahmet İnsel, Ali Bayramoğlu, Cengiz Aktar and more than a thousand Turkish intellectuals introduced the "I Apologize" campaign, thus opposing deliberately organized collective obliviousness in Turkey. This version of history understates the responsibility of the government in the era of deportations and massacres of Armenians.

Baskın Oran is an independent personality who continues to stimulate the conscience in Turkey despite the legal problems and threats. He is one of the representatives of this vanguard of the civil society fighting for Turkey to complete its democratic transformation. He does not hesitate to speak of the"second revolution" in progress, the first being that of the establishment of the republic by Mustafa Kemal Atatürk in 1923.

Baskın Oran was an assistant professor, but twice in 1971 and 1982 he was banned from teaching by the military junta.

== Identity Conflicts ==
Baskın Oran claims that most of the conflicts in Turkey are due to the Republic's choice to rely on Turkish identity (ethnic – blood based) instead of choosing the land, He feels sorry that the name of the people "Türk" is chosen instead of "Türkiyeli" (from Turkey). In the Ottoman era, the Turks were one of the "millet" (infra-identity) that made up the empire ruled by the Ottomans (supra-identity). The other "millets" were Greeks, Armenians, Kurds, Syriacs, Arabs, etc. The mistake of Atatürk's nationalism is to have replaced the supra-identity "neutral" by one of the infra-identities instead of building the nation on land, (the Ottomans were not Turkish in an ethnic sense, moreover they did not recognize themselves as such). He rejected the myth that kemalism was the source of an egalitarian society. He created an acronym to designate on which sociotype the ideology and the dominant class are based: -- Sunni Hanafi and secular Muslim Turkish ), they are, according to him, the equivalent in Turkey of what the WASP (White Anglo-Saxon Protestant) are in the United States.

== From Kemalism to Social Democracy ==
Baskın Oran, who comes from a family of the Kemalist and secular bourgeoisie always likes to mention that he grew up in favor of the nationalists of his country. He was a leftist activist while still a student feeling close to communists as were many other people at that time (in 1968, he was 23 years old). In 1986, he wrote about The question of the Turkish minority in Greece and about Turkish-Greek relations.

He was then contacted by a Kurdish personality, who points out to him that Kurds live a similar situation in Turkey, following this discussion, he focuses his work on the problem of minorities and nationalism inside Turkey. Later, in 2003, he was asked by the government that as an expert on this subject to co-write a report, which, despite the wrath of justice, will become the book "Türkiye'de Azınlıklar, Kevramlar – Teori – Lozan – İç mevzuat – İçtihat – Uygulama"(Minorities in Turkey: concepts, theory, Lausanne, domestic legislation, jurisprudence, practice). This book became a "bestseller" in Turkey.

Another meeting in 1993 was also decisive. Baskın Oran received a call from Hrant Dink, a journalist who said he was very moved by his writings, especially by the fact that he was a Turkish who wrote them. (it must be remembered here that the subject of what he wrote was taboo in Turkey, from the emergence of the Republic and in the name of the sacrosanct national unity). They met again and remained closely linked until the journalist's assassination on 19 January 2007 separated them.

Baskin now proclaims himself as a social democrat, without being affiliated with any political party.
