= Figen Yüksekdağ =

Turkish politician

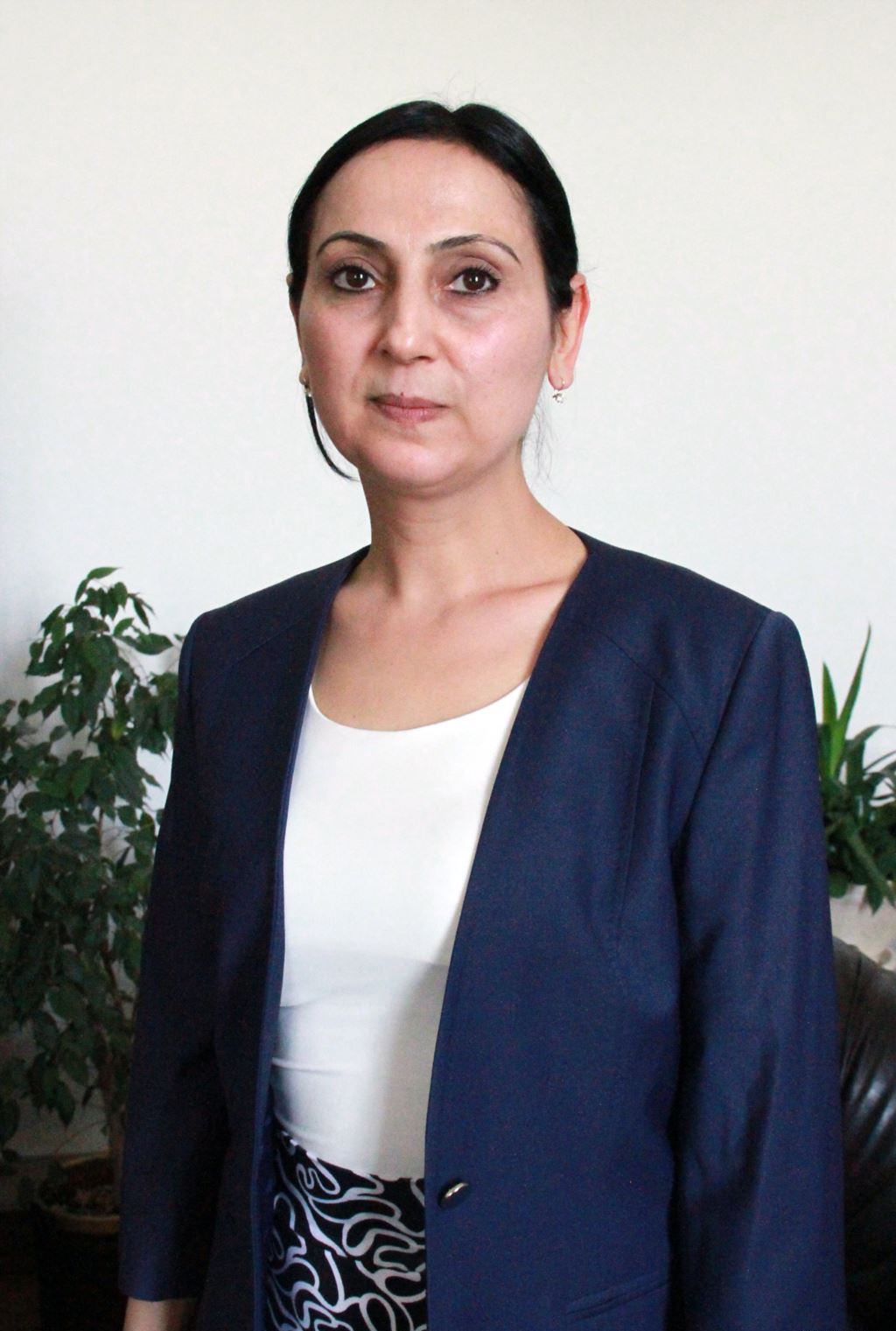

Chairwoman of the Peoples' Democratic Party
- In office 22 June 2014 – 9 March 2017 Serving with Selahattin Demirtaş
- Preceded by: Ertuğrul Kürkçü & Sebahat Tuncel
- Succeeded by: Serpil Kemalbay

Member of the Grand National Assembly
- In office 7 June 2015 – 21 February 2017
- Constituency: Van (June 2015, Nov 2015)

Leader of the Socialist Party of the Oppressed
- In office 29 January 2010 – 7 September 2014
- Preceded by: party established
- Succeeded by: Sultan Ulusoy

Personal details
- Born: Figen Yüksekdağ; 19 December 1971 (age 54) Adana, Turkey
- Party: Socialist Party of the Oppressed (2010–2014); Peoples' Democratic Party (2014–2017)

Figen Yüksekdağ Şenoğlu (born 19 December 1971) is a Turkish politician and journalist, who was a former co-leader of the left-wing Peoples' Democratic Party (HDP) of Turkey from 2014 to 2017, serving alongside Selahattin Demirtaş. She was a Member of Parliament for Van since the June 2015 general election until her parliamentary membership was revoked by the courts on 21 February 2017. Her party membership and therefore her co-leadership position were revoked by the courts on 9 March 2017 following a six-year prison sentence for distributing "terrorist propaganda".

In May 2024, she was sentenced to 30 years and three months in prison. HDP leader Selahattin Demirtaş was sentenced to over 40 years in prison.

== Life and work ==
Figen Yüksekdağ grew up as the ninth of ten children in a rural Turkmen family in the village Gölovası, Yumurtalık, in Adana Province. She described her family as devout, conservative and nationalistic. Her father nevertheless made a point that his daughters were studying and were successful. During her time in high school, she began to engage in political activities and joined the labor movement. When she was arrested on an International Workers' Day demonstration, this led to conflicts in the family. At the age of 18 she left home and went to Istanbul; later the relationship to her family normalized again.

== Political career ==
She was an independent parliamentary candidate for the Adana electoral district in the 2002 general election. She was involved in women's rights movements for several years before becoming the editor of the Socialist Woman magazine. While serving on the board of the Atılım newspaper, she was taken into custody in 2009 due to her political activity. She cofounded the Socialist Party of the Oppressed (ESP) shortly after in 2010 and resigned as leader in 2014 to join the HDP, with which the ESP merged later the same year. In June 2014 Yüksekdağ was elected the co-leader of the HDP together with Selahattin Demirtaş. She was elected as a Member of Parliament (MP) on the 7 June 2015, and re-elected on 1 November 2015.

== Legal prosecution ==
She was stripped of the parliamentary immunity in May 2016 and prohibited from leaving Turkey in October of the same year. She was arrested on the 3 November 2016 for allegedly not cooperating in "terror"-related investigations. On 21 February 2017 the parliament revoked her parliamentary membership and on the 9 March 2017 the Supreme Court of Appeal ruled she was no longer a member of the HDP. On 11 April 2017 she was sentenced to 1 year in prison for "terror propaganda." On 7 January 2019 she was sentenced to pay 1'740 Turkish Lira for insulting the Turkish president President Recep Tayyip Erdoğan. On the 17 March 2021, the Turkish state prosecutor before the Court of Cassation Bekir Şahin, filed a lawsuit before the Constitutional Court demanding for Yüksekdağ and 686 other HDP politicians a five-year ban to engage in politics. The lawsuit was filed jointly with a request of a closure of the HDP due to the parties alleged organizational links with the Kurdistan Workers' Party (PKK).

== See also ==
- Women in Turkish politics
