= Article 299 of the Turkish Penal Code =

Ban on insulting the Turkish President

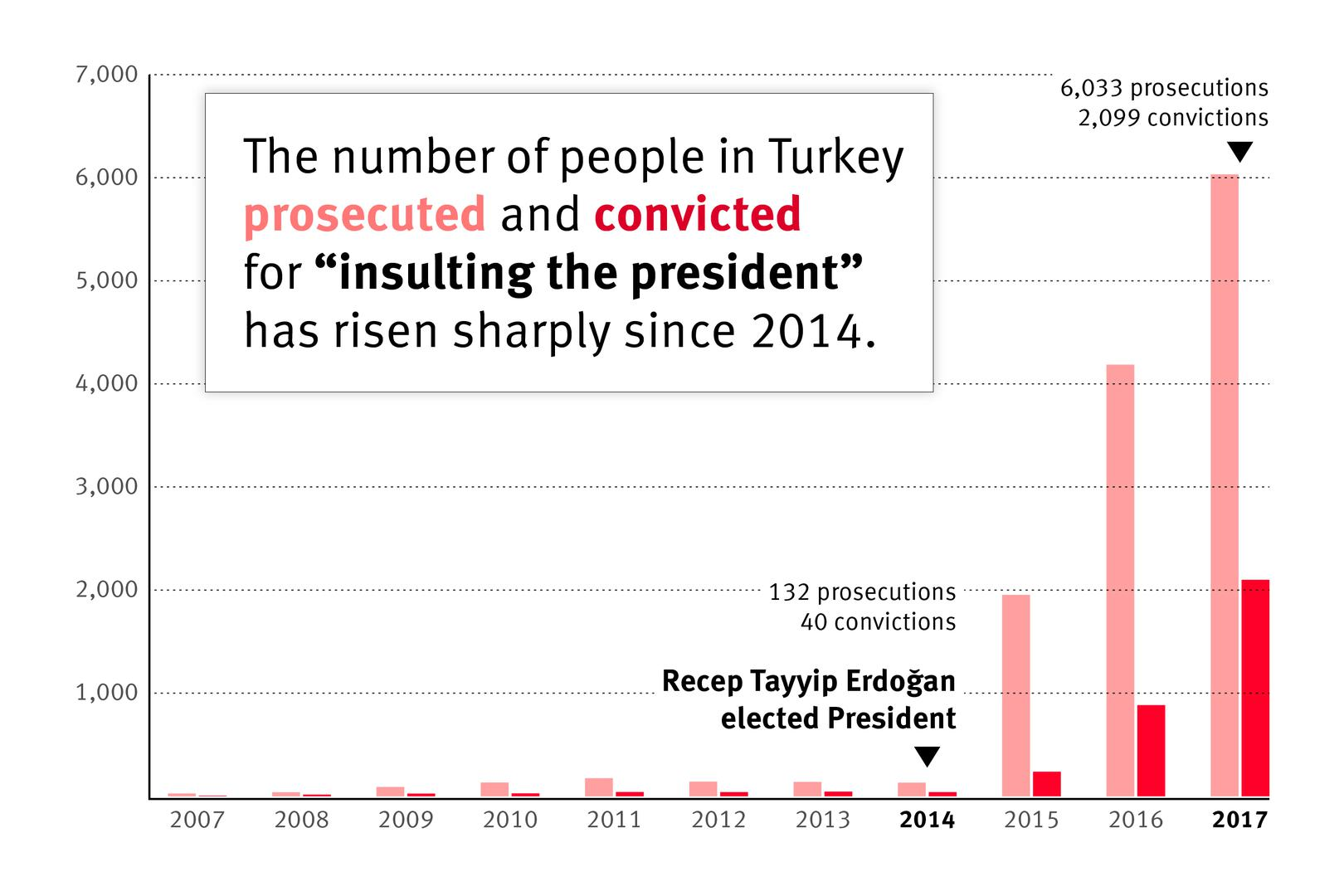
Article 299's prosecution have surged during Erdoğan's presidency.

Article 299 of the Turkish Penal Code is a lèse-majesté law that deems it illegal to "Insult the President of Turkey". A person who is sentenced for a violation of this article can be sentenced to a prison term between one and four years and if the violation was made in public the verdict can be elevated by a sixth. Prosecutions often target critics of the government, independent journalists, and political cartoonists. Between 2014 and 2019, 128,872 investigations were launched for this offense and prosecutors opened 27,717 criminal cases. Turkey's article 299 and article 125, which allows one party to sue for insult despite lack of sufficient evidence, are arguably used as part of SLAPPs.

== Origins ==
Insulting the President has been prohibited since the promulgation of the Turkish Penal Code in 1926, but initially under the article 158 and a difference was made between an aggressive and a disrespectful publication. The first was seen as a serious violation, while the latter was punished with prison terms between six months and three years. The article was valid until June 2005.

== History ==
In June 2005, article 158 was replaced with article 299, and the punishment was elevated to between one and four years. If the violation was made in public, the punishment shall be elevated by a sixth and in order a person can be prosecuted according to this article, the Ministry of Justice has to give its consent. During the presidency of Abdullah Gül, several hundred people were accused for having violated the article, more than five-hundred were prosecuted.

The prosecutions surged after Recep Tayyip Erdoğan took office as president in 2014 and since, thousands of people have been investigated and sentenced for insulting the president.

In 2016, it was attempted to abolish Article 299. In the appeal to the Constitutional Court of Turkey it was advocated that in the past, insulting the president had a different juridic value than insults to other state employees but, since the transition from a government led by a prime minister to a government led by a president, the office of the president became evidently an important and executive political office and all state employees should be treated equally before the law. Furthermore, the article is contrary to the European Convention of Human Rights. The appeal was not successful as the Constitutional Court ruled in December 2016 that the article shall remain in the Turkish Penal Code as the President represents not only a person but the whole Turkish nation. It also deemed the law to be in accordance to the legal benefit and even though the law grants the right to criticize, it shall not tolerate insults.

=== Criticism ===
The Venice Commission of the Council of Europe criticized the application of the article in 2016. The European Court of Human Rights has frequently ruled that convictions violate Article 10 of the European Convention on Human Rights.

Cartoonist Selçuk Erdem, prosecuted under the law for a caricature of Erdogan, stated "someone going to court due to a cartoon is a very sad thing" and that government officials "don't have a sense of humour" and "don't want - or like - freedom of speech or criticism". CHP chair Kemal Kılıçdaroğlu retweeted a cartoon deemed offensive, stating "You cannot stop criticism and humour by putting them in prison."

== Prominent examples ==
Canan Kaftancıoğlu, a leader of the Republican People's Party (CHP), was charged and sentenced for insulting the president in September 2019. She vowed to appeal the verdict. Kemal Kılıçdaroğlu, the president of the CHP, was also sentenced for a tweet including a cartoon depicting several animals resembling Recep Tayyip Erdoğan with the caption Land of Tayyip. Sebahat Tuncel of the Peoples' Democratic Party (HDP), while imprisoned for another case, was sentenced to almost one year imprisonment for saying the president is an enemy of Kurds and women which was deemed an insult of the president by the court. Merve Büyüksaraç, the Miss Turkey of 2006 was delivered with a suspended fourteen months prison sentence for an Instagram post with a satirical poem about Erdoğan. An investigation was also initiated against a group of women who chanted the slogan "Jump, jump, you're Tayyip if you don't" during the International Women's Day on 8 March. In March 2021, Selahattin Demirtaş was sentenced to 3 years and 6 months imprisonment for having said Erdoğan “fluttered from corridor to corridor” in chase of a picture together with the Russian president Vladimir Putin. In April 2021 a new law entered into force which deprived students of the right to sleep at University dorms if they were sentenced for insulting the Turkish president.

== Statistics ==
Year	Sued	Prison sentences	Comments
1982–2014	1,816	n.a.	
2014	132	40	
2015	1,953	238	
2016	4,187	884	
2017	6,033	2099	
2018	6,270	2,775	
2019	13,990	4,291	
2020	9,773	3,665	
Total	44,154	13,992	

== See also ==
- Insult of officials and the state
