= Selahattin Demirtaş =

Turkish politician

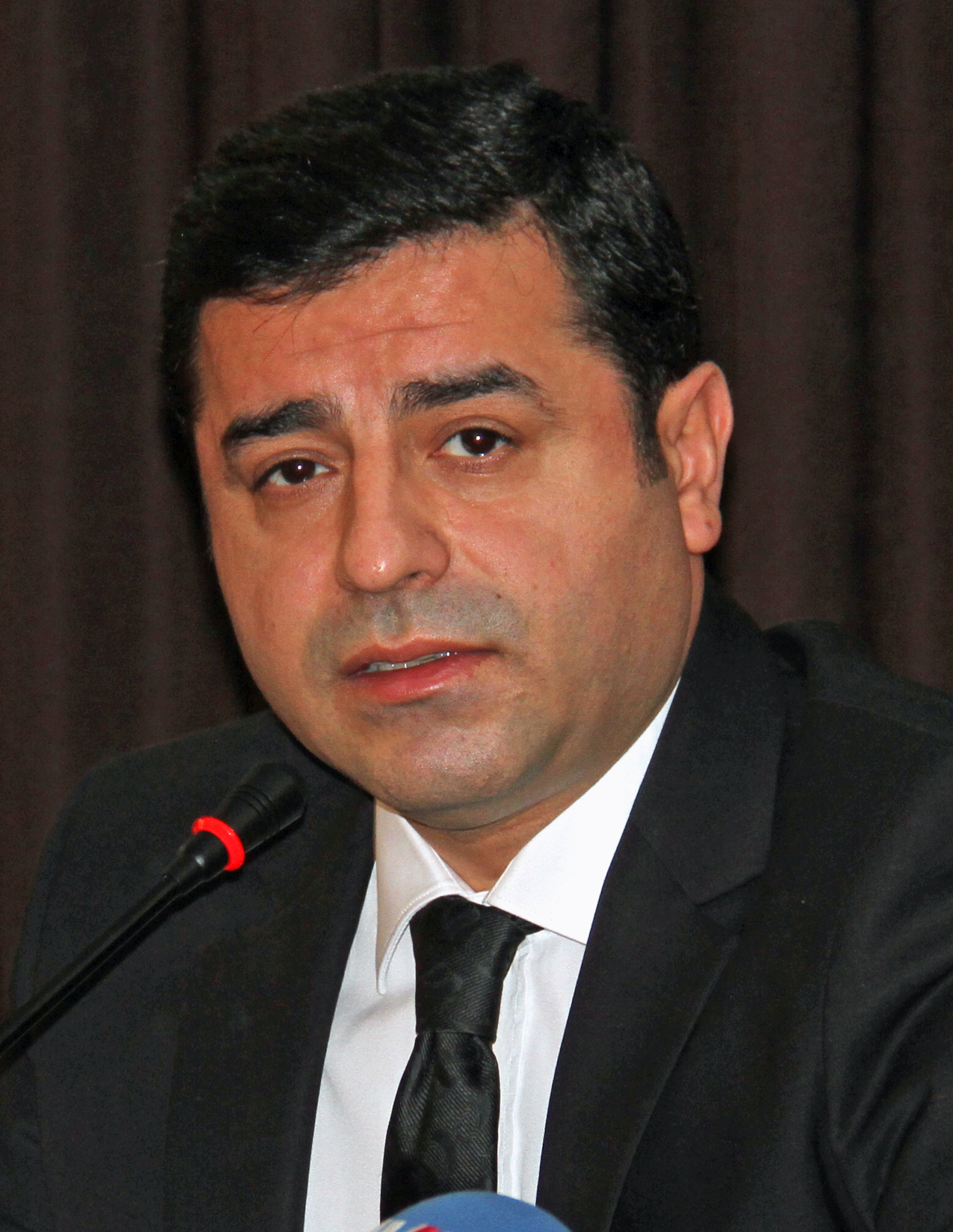
- Demirtaş, 2015

Chairman of the Peoples' Democratic Party
- In office 22 June 2014 – 11 February 2018 Serving with Serpil Kemalbay
- Preceded by: Ertuğrul Kürkçü
- Succeeded by: Sezai Temelli

Co-chair of the Peace and Democracy Party
- In office 1 February 2010 – 22 April 2014 Serving with Gültan Kışanak
- Preceded by: Mustafa Ayzit; Demir Çelik
- Succeeded by: Party abolished See Democratic Regions Party

Member of the Grand National Assembly
- In office 22 July 2007 – 7 July 2018
- Constituency: Diyarbakır (2007); Hakkari (2011); Istanbul (I) (Jun 2015, Nov 2015)

Personal details
- Born: 10 April 1973 (age 53) Palu, Elazığ, Turkey
- Citizenship: Turkey
- Party: Democratic Society Party (2007–2008); Peace and Democracy Party (2008–2014); Peoples' Democratic Party (2014–2020)
- Spouse: Başak Demirtaş (m. 2002)
- Children: 2
- Relatives: Nurettin Demirtaş (brother)
- Education: Ankara University Faculty of Law

Selahattin Demirtaş (born 10 April 1973) is a Kurdish politician, lawyer and author. He was the co-leader of the left-wing pro-Kurdish Peoples' Democratic Party (HDP), serving alongside Figen Yüksekdağ from 2014 to 2018. Selahattin Demirtaş announced that he left politics after the May 2023 elections.

Demirtaş was the presidential candidate of the HDP in the 2014 presidential election, coming in third place. He led the HDP to gather 13.1% at the June 2015 parliament elections and 10.7% in the snap elections in November 2015, coming 4th in each election. He has been imprisoned since 4 November 2016 and despite his imprisonment the HDP fielded Demirtaş as its candidate for the 2018 presidential election, running his campaign from prison.

In a judgement given in December 2020, the European Court of Human Rights judged that, given "the timing of Demirtaş continued detention (coinciding with an important constitutional referendum and the presidential election)" and Turkey's "systemic trend of “gagging” dissenting voices", Demirtaş's continued pre-trial detention's political purpose had been predominant". Demirtaş has been imprisoned in Edirne F-type prison since 4 November 2016.

== Early life and education ==
Selahattin Demirtaş was born on 10 April 1973 in Palu, Elazığ in a Zaza family. He identifies as a Zaza Kurd, stating that "Kurd" is the broader name and that Zazaki is one of the Kurdish dialects.

He completed his primary and secondary education there. From 1991 he studied maritime commerce and management at the Dokuz Eylül University, where he would face political problems that would force him to leave school without finishing his degree. He returned to Diyarbakır and retook the university entrance exam in 1993, after which he enrolled at the Ankara University Law Faculty.

== Professional career ==
After his graduation, Demirtaş worked as a freelance lawyer for a while. In 2000 he became a member of the executive committee at the Diyarbakır branch of the Human Rights Association (IHD). The IHD Chair at the time was Osman Baydemir who was elected as the mayor of Diyarbakır at the following local election. Demirtaş replaced him as the chair of the Diyarbakır IHD in 2004. During his term as chair, the association focused heavily on the increasing unsolved political murders in Turkey.

== Early political career ==
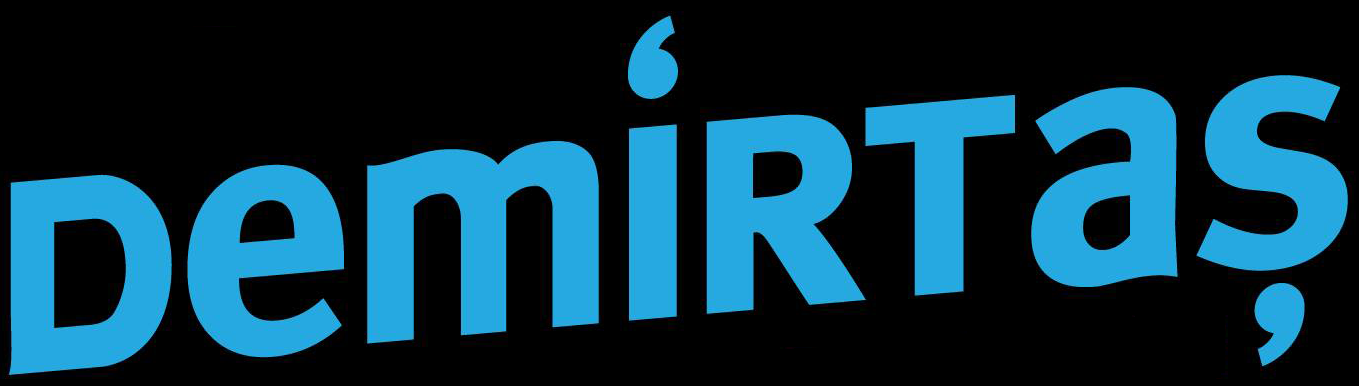
Selahattin Demirtaş's election campaign logo

He cites his experience at the funeral of politician and human right lawyer Vedat Aydın (1953–1991) as a political awakening:

I became a different person. My life's course changed … although I didn't fully understand the reason behind the events, now I knew: we were Kurds, and since this wasn't an identity I would toss away, this was also my problem."

From international observers often dubbed as a Kurdish Obama Demirtaş started his political career as a member of the Democratic Society Party (DTP) in 2007 at which time he stood as one of the 'Thousand Hope Candidates' for the DTP and several other democratic organizations in Turkey. He was elected to the 23rd Parliament and became the Parliamentary Chief Officer for the party at the age of 34. As such he supported the abolition of the restrictions against education in the Kurdish language and demanded equal rights for Turks and Kurds in the Turkish constitution. When in October 2007 an article published in the Bolu Ekspress demanded politicians of the DTP to be killed for deaths caused by the Kurdistan Workers' Party (PKK) he filed a complaint but the court decided it fell into the bounds of "freedom of thought" in 2008. Demirtaş then appealed to the ECHR for a violation of the 2 and 13 Articles of the European Convention on Human Rights, but in 2015 the ECHR ruled in favor Turkey.

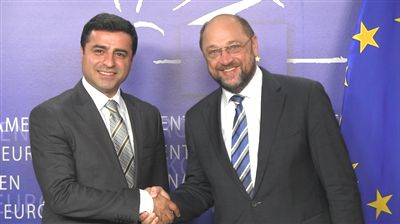
Demirtaş meeting with the President of the European Parliament, Martin Schulz in 2013

The DTP was closed down by a Supreme Court order in 2009 for the parties alleged connections to the PKK, and the DTP MPs moved to the Peace and Democracy Party (BDP). The BDP held its first congress in 2010 and elected Selahattin Demirtaş and Gültan Kışanak as its new co-chairs. Demirtaş contested the 2011 elections as part of the joint 'Labor, Democracy and Freedom' list endorsed by the BDP and 18 different democratic political organizations, this time for Hakkari. He was re-elected to parliament as an independent.

At a rally in the Kızıltepe district of Mardin in November 2012, Demirtaş criticized the Turkish police for intervening after marchers carried posters of Abdullah Öcalan, saying "I call on you, those who are not bothered about the Kurds’ killer Evren’s statue being erected [or by] schools named after Evren. If they [Kurds] cannot hang Öcalan’s poster in Kurdistan, then where would they hang it? We will go further and erect his statue." In 2019, Demirtaş defended his statement in court, arguing that he was responding to how posters were met with panzers and truncheons, and that he is opposed to erecting statues of Öcalan.

== Opposition leader ==
=== Peace process 2013 ===
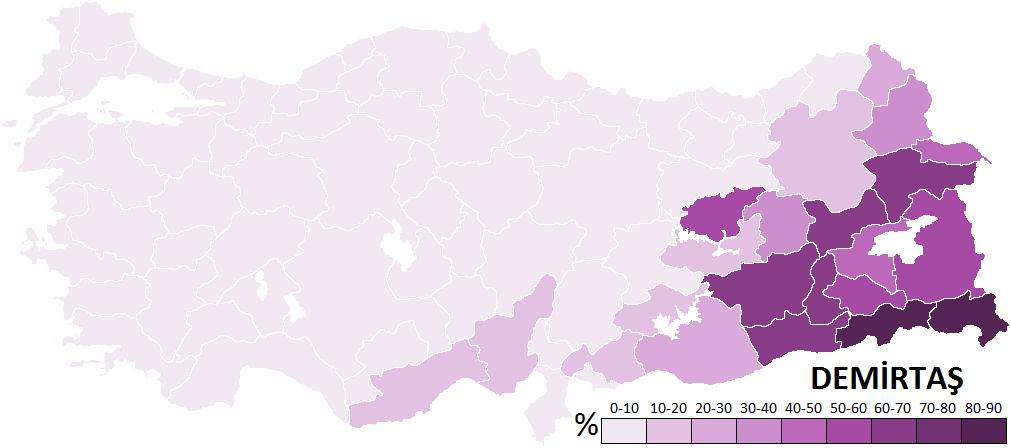
Votes obtained by Demirtaş throughout the 81 Provinces of Turkey in the 2014 presidential election

Demirtaş was the co-chair of BDP during the period when the peace process and negotiations kick-started in Turkey. He was one of the BDP politicians who met Öcalan on Imrali island during the peace negotiations.

=== 2014 Presidential campaign ===
In 2014 Demirtaş and Figen Yüksekdağ were elected as the co-chairs of the Peoples' Democratic Party (HDP) – a new initiative originating from a three-year-old coalition of the BDP and various different political parties and organization under the auspices of the Peoples' Democratic Congress (HDK) - for the 2014 presidential elections of Turkey, being one of three candidates and hoping to attract left-wing voters. He came third with 9.77% of the vote.

=== 2014 Municipal elections ===
He stressed that gender equality and a women's quota is preeminent in their party program for the elections and announced in October 2013, that for the Metropolis Diyarbakır a female mayor was planned. In the Municipal elections of 2014, Gültan Kisanak was elected the Mayor of Diyarbakir, and Februnye Akyol Co-Mayor of Mardin.

=== June 2015 general elections ===
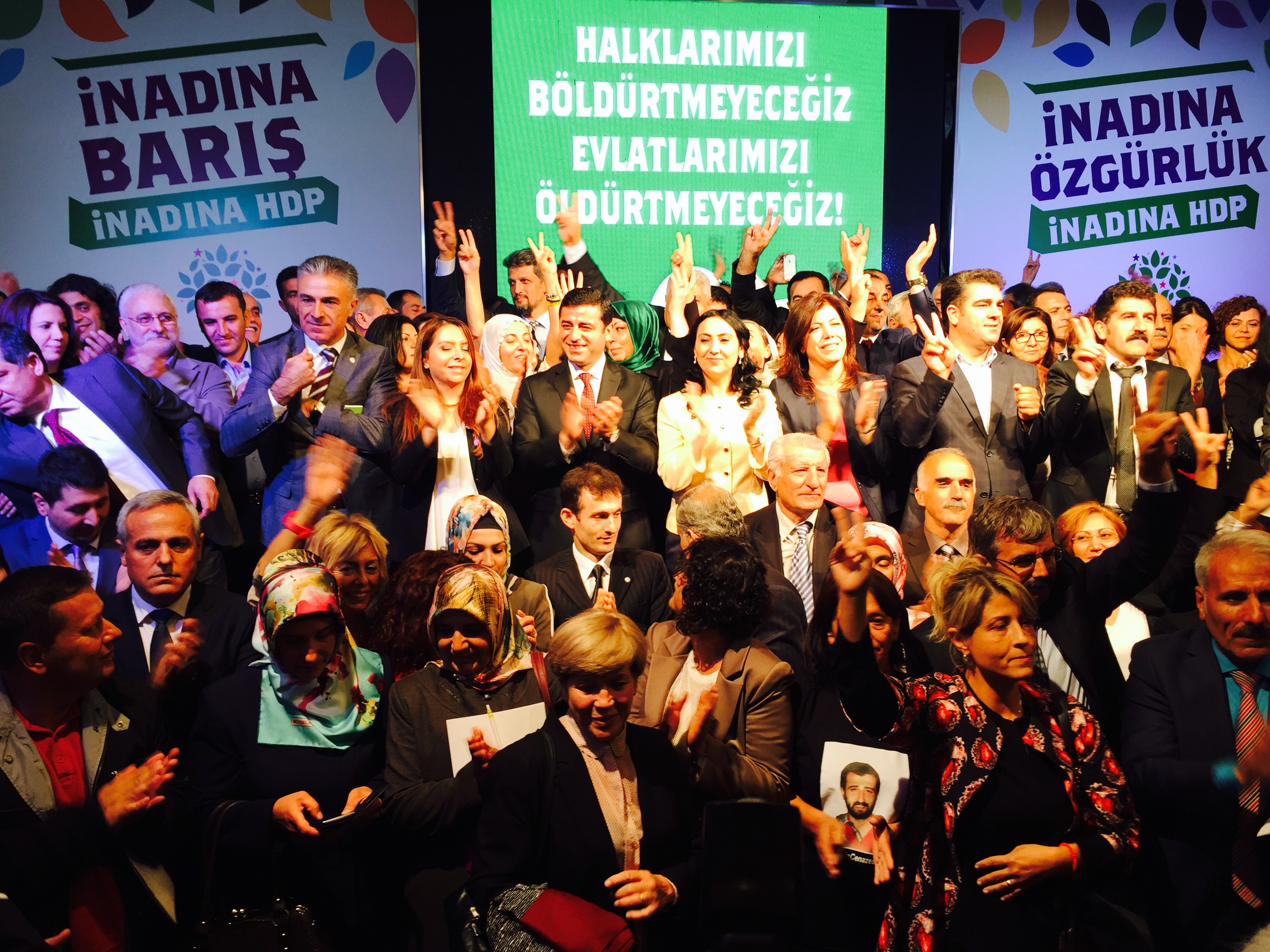
Figen Yüksekdağ and Selahattin Demirtaş, November 2015 Turkish general election

Demirtaş was co-leader along with Figen Yüksekdağ during the June 2015 Turkish general election, the party's first campaign in a general election. The HDP came in fourth place with 13.12% of the vote, breaking for the first time the 10% electoral threshold to enter the parliament, sending 80 HDP representative there out of 550 seats. The election results were largely perceived to be a surprise for the opposition, with the HDP having surpassed the election threshold by a healthy 3% of the vote despite many pollsters claiming that it was hovering at the 10% boundary.

HDP co-leader Demirtaş was widely seen as the victor of the election, in the sense that as well as exceeding many vote share projections, his party won the same amount of MPs (80 seats) as the Nationalist Movement Party. The international press characterized Demirtaş as the 'Kurdish Obama' and supporters of the HDP took to the street to celebrate their success on the evening of polling day. Celebrating the victory, Dermirtaş stated: "From now on, the HDP is Turkey's party. HDP is Turkey, Turkey is HDP."

Other commentators noted the rising difficulties ahead, Demirtaş risking to be undercut by Occalan's political influence, the mechanical rise of anti-Kurdish sentiment among Turkey nationalist forces, and the need to not alienate tactical voters.

=== Peace talks collapse ===
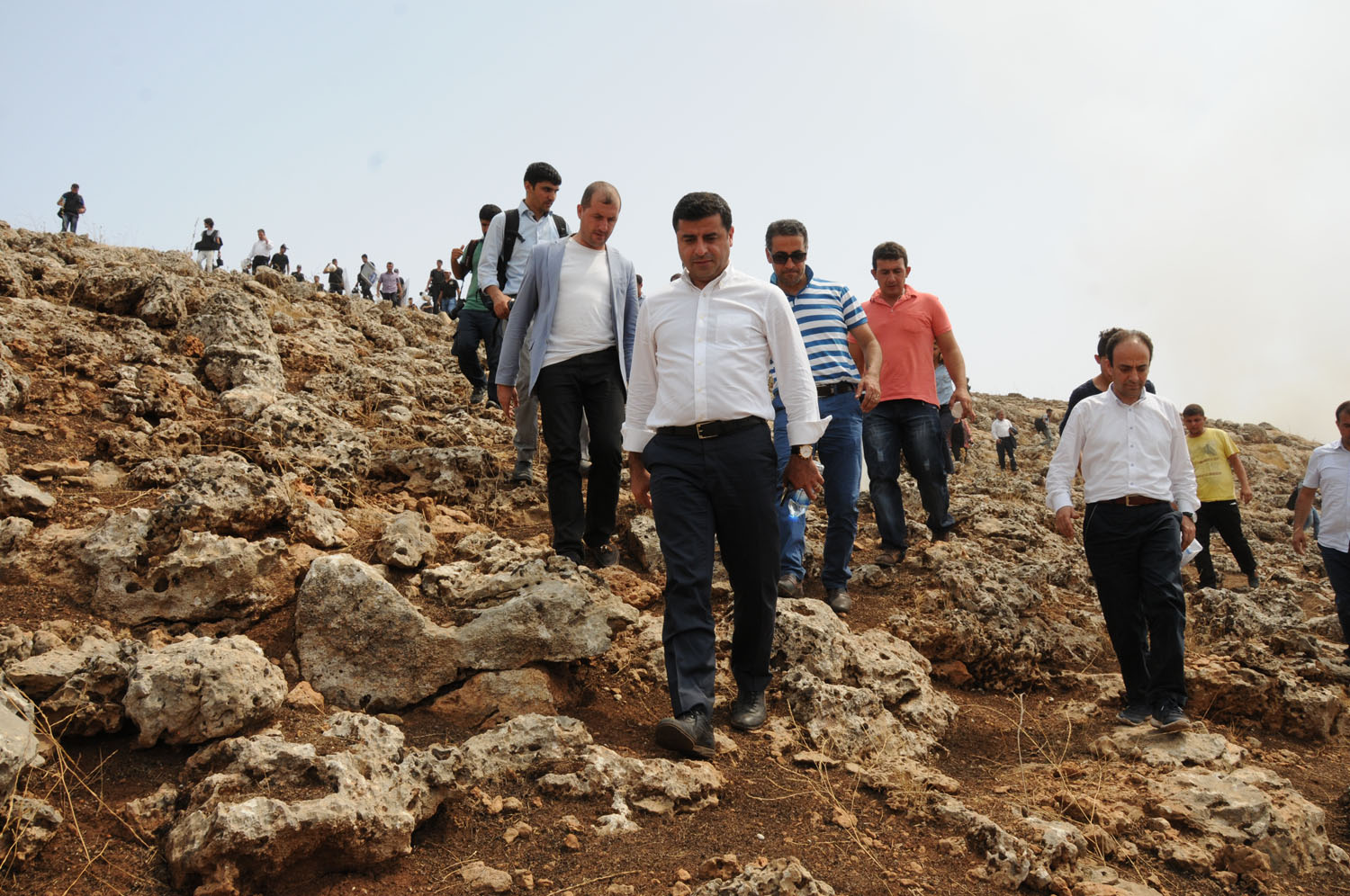
Demirtas in Cizre

In July 2015, the peace process initiated by AKP and PKK leadership and facilitated by HDP collapsed. Demirtaş attributes this collapse to AKP, responding to the June election's votes loss to following parties, loss of its governing majority, and relative electoral defeat. According to Demirtaş, AKP bleeding votes in polls lead this party to reignite the war against PKK. In July 2015, observing an increase in violence between PKK-affiliated parties and Turkish authorities, Demirtaş opposed violence from both parties and called for a higher political autonomy in South-East Turkey.

==== March on Cizre ====
When in early September 2015 the Turkish authorities imposed a curfew on the city of Cizre HDP parliamentarians around Demirtas went on a march on Cizre, but were prevented from entering the city by the Turkish authorities who alleged security concerns. He was allowed in the city only after the curfew was lifted on 12 September.

=== November 2015 general election ===
In August 2015, two months after the June 2015 general elections and one month after the return to military confrontation with PKK, early general election were announced for November 2015. HDP, led by Demirtaş, came third, securing 10,7% of the vote, barely passing the parliament's 10% threshold.

=== 2016 to 2018 Presidential campaign ===
In May 2016, the Turkish parliament revoked the parliamentary immunity for several HDP politicians including the HDP leadership.

Following the 2016 Turkish coup d'état attempt, Demirtaş stated in his statement on 16 July that he was against the coup and that the attempt was an indication that there was still no democracy in Turkey. On 25 July, Erdogan invite and met with major opposition leaders, except HDP leadership and Dermirtaş.

On 4 November 2016, few months after the 2016 Turkish coup d'état attempt and in the mist of large scale purges, Demirtaş was arrested along with Figen Yüksekdağ and other HDP MPs, accused of spreading propaganda for militants fighting the Turkish state. Demirtaş stated he is not a "manager, member, spokesperson, or sympathizer" of the armed PKK group.

Demirtaş was officially announced as the candidate of the People's Democratic Party (HDP) on 4 May 2018, for the presidential election, after members of the party had hinted at his candidacy weeks in advance. Party leader Pervin Buldan declared that Demirtaş, the jailed former co-chair of the HDP, would be leading a five-party "Kurdish alliance" into the general election. He received 8.4% of the votes.

== Legal prosecution and detention ==
=== Initial arrest and motive ===
Demirtaş was arrested on 4 November 2016. The criminal indictment against Demirtaş alleged that in a public statement on 6 October, the HDP raised support for protests against claimed approach of the Turkish Government shows towards the Islamic State (IS) attack on Kobane. The HDP was blamed for the Kobanî protests in 2014, which resulted in the death of over 50 people despite it having called for an investigation on the events leading to the deaths in parliament which was turned down by the Justice and Development Party (AKP) and the Nationalist Movement Party (MHP). President Recep Tayyip Erdogan blamed Demirtaş for provoking protests, and said that all Kurdish people are the citizens of Republic of Turkey, and no one can attempt to build a state for them. Demirtaş's repeatedly stated opposition to both PKK and TSK violences, calling killed Turkish soldiers "the children of this country, our children", and declaring "No one has anything to win from a civil war in Turkey. Just look at Syria and Iraq.” His prosecution also used wiretaps as evidence to show relation with the Democratic Society Congress (DTK), which the prosecution views as a part of the PKK.

=== Main prosecution and appeals ===
On 18 January 2017, Turkish prosecutors announced they were seeking a 142-year prison sentence for Demirtaş and according to The New York Times, more than hundred charges have been brought against Demirtaş.

On 7 September 2018 he was sentenced to 4 years and 8 months for a speech he had made at a Newroz celebration on 20 March 2013.

==== 2018 and 2020 ECHR's judgements ====
On 20 November 2018 the European Court of Human Rights (ECHR) ruled Demirtaş should be released from preliminary detention, and ordered Turkey to pay him 25'000 Euros. On 30 November 2018 a court in Turkey ruled he shall remain detained despite the ECHR ruling to release him. According to the verdict by the Turkish court, the ruling of the ECHR was not definitive and therefore not binding. The sentence he received 7 September 2018 was upheld on 4 December 2018 by an appeal court. On 31 December 2018 the lawyers of Demirtaş appealed the sentence at the Constitutional Court.

On 22 December 2020, the ECHR condemns Turkey and called again for the release of Selahattin Demirtaş. The Court deemed the lifting of the parliamentary immunity and the subsequent pre-trial detentions as politically motivated because this step came only after the governing Justice and Development Party (AKP) had lost its majority in parliament.

=== Other prosecutions ===
On 17 March 2021, the state prosecutor Bekir Şahin demanded for him and 686 other HDP politicians a five-year ban to engage in politics together with a closure of the HDP due to alleged organizational cooperation with the PKK.

A few days later on 22 March 2021, Demirtas was sentenced to three years and six months imprisonment for having insulted the Turkish President Recep Tayyip Erdoğan by mentioning he had "fluttered from corridor to corridor" trying to meet the Russian president Vladimir Putin during a summit in Paris. The remarks were made after Erdogan's return from Russia at the Atatürk Airport in Istanbul.

=== Detention ===
Since 4 November 2016 he is detained in the prison in the F-Type prison Edirne, a border town near Bulgaria and Greece, far away from Diyarbakır in South-Eastern Turkey, where his family lives at. His wife visits him once a week. ECHR called for releasing Demirtaş and stated that his arrest in 2016 violated his freedom of speech and the right of joining to the elections. According to HDP speaker Saruhan Oluç, he is not allowed to receive visits by parliamentarians of the HDP. Since the COVID-19 pandemic his visitors rights are restricted to non-contact visits. As his wife informed the public on in an interview with Ismail Küçükkaya on FOX TV about it, the Radio and Television Supreme Council (RTÜK) initiated an investigation on the program due to her remarks. In November 2022, he was flown to Diyarbakir where he was shortly allowed to visit his father in hospital. After the short visit, he was brought back to Edirne. His cellmate was for years the fellow HDP politician Abdullah Zeydan who was released in January 2022. In March the same year, the arrested mayor of Diyarbakir Adnan Selçuk Mizrakli became his new cellmate. After extending his mandate in 2023 elections, President Recep Tayyip Erdoğan said that releasing Demirtaş would not be possible under his governance.

However, in March 2025, it was reported that Turkey was engaged in discussions about the potential release of Selahattin Demirtaş, as part of the new PKK-Turkey peace process. Recent remarks by figures close to Erdoğan have fueled talks about Demirtaş's release, suggesting a move towards reconciliation and addressing long-standing grievances.

== Personal life ==
Demirtaş is of Zaza origin and he knows the Zaza language. Demirtaş was asked "Aren't you Zaza?" in a programme. In response to this question, he defined himself as "Kurdish Zaza".

Demirtaş is married to Başak Demirtaş and is the father of two girls, Delal and Dılda. His parents are Tahir and Sadiye Demirtaş and he has six siblings.

Demirtaş has faced threats due to his political activity and on 22 November 2015, he survived an assassination attempt.

== Electoral history ==
=== Presidential ===
Election date	Votes	Percentage of votes	Political party	Map
2014	3,958,048	9.76%	Peoples' Democratic Party	
2018	4,205,794	8.40%	Peoples' Democratic Party	—N/a

=== Parliamentary ===
Election date	Votes	Percentage of votes	Partner	Political party	Map
2015 June	6,058,489	13.12%	Figen Yüksekdağ	Peoples' Democratic Party	
2015 November	5,148,085	10.76%	Figen Yüksekdağ	Peoples' Democratic Party	

=== Local ===
Election date	Votes	Percentage of votes	Political party	Map
2014	2,611,127	6.29%	Peace and Democracy Party Peoples' Democratic Party	

== Publications ==
In detention, he wrote a book titled Seher containing short stories. The Turkish edition of Seher has reportedly sold more than 200,000 copies. He has also written the book Devran in prison. In 2020 the book Leylan was published and Demirtaş acknowledged he would prefer a career in literature than the one in politics. In 2023, a short story by Demirtaş titled My Handsome One appeared in Kurdistan +100: Stories from a Future State, an anthology of short stories by thirteen contemporary Kurdish writers.

== Awards ==
In November 2019, the Progressive Alliance awarded him their Political Courage Award. His wife Başak Demirtaş attended the award ceremony as he was still imprisoned at the time.

2022 Political courage Award by the Institute François Mitterrand. Hişyar Özsoy of the HDP attended the award ceremony on Demirtaş's behalf.
