= Mahir Ünal =

Turkish politician (born 1966)

Mahir Ünal MP
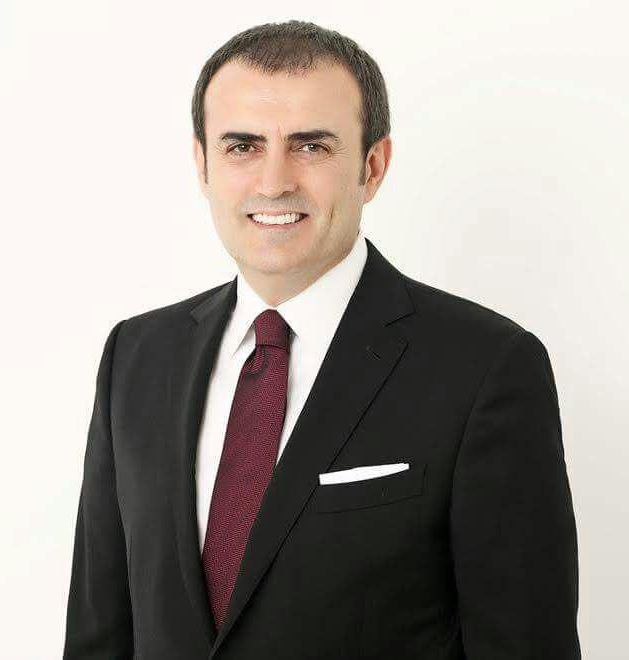

Spokesperson of the Justice and Development Party
- Incumbent
- Assumed office 29 May 2017
- Preceded by: Ömer Çelik

Minister of Culture and Tourism
- In office 24 November 2015 – 24 May 2016
- Prime Minister: Ahmet Davutoğlu
- Preceded by: Yalçın Topçu
- Succeeded by: Nabi Avcı

Member of the Grand National Assembly
- Incumbent
- Assumed office 12 June 2011
- Constituency: Kahramanmaraş (2011, June 2015, Nov 2015, 2018)

Personal details
- Born: 1 July 1966 (age 59) Elbistan, Kahramanmaraş, Turkey
- Citizenship: Turkish
- Party: Justice and Development Party
- Education: Theology
- Alma mater: Marmara University; Istanbul University
- Cabinet: 64th
- Website: mahirunal.com

Mahir Ünal (born 1 July 1966) is a Turkish politician and academic from the Justice and Development Party (AKP) who served as the Minister of Culture and Tourism from 24 November 2015 to 24 May 2016. He has been a Member of Parliament for the electoral district of Kahramanmaraş since being elected in the 2011 general election. He was re-elected in both the June and November 2015 general elections.

Prior to becoming an MP, Ünal was a campaign strategist for the AKP during the 2007 general and the 2004 and 2009 local elections. He has also worked as an election strategist for elections held in Iraq, Malaysia, Cyprus, Egypt and Lebanon, having served as an advisor to local administrations on the issues of political relations and local policies.

== Early life and career ==
=== Education ===
Mahir Ünal was born on 1 July 1966 in the Elbistan district of Kahramanmaraş Province. Having completed his primary and secondary education in Elbistan, he attended Bahçelievler Koca Sinan High School in Istanbul and graduated in 1984. In 1991, he graduated from Marmara University Faculty of Theology. He received his master's degree from Istanbul University Institute of Social Sciences in 1997, specialising in social structures and social change. He has continued pursuing a doctorate in the same university's Faculty of Sciences and Literature, in the field of sociology.

=== Early career ===
In 1992, Ünal became a teacher. He later became an advisor on the fields of urban policy, local government and political communication. In 2005, he became an advisor at the Istanbul Chamber of Commerce. Between 2007 and 2009, he became a member of the executive board of İstanbul Büyükşehir Belediyesi Spor Kulübü. He later became the director of the behavioural sciences department of a private university and also taught on the subject of organisational behaviour.

== Political career ==
=== Election strategist ===
Ünal joined the Justice and Development Party (AKP) in 2003 and began teaching at the AKP Political Academy. Since 2004, he has participated in the electoral strategy boards that organised the AKP's election campaigns since the 2004 local elections. Internationally, he has served as an election strategist for political parties in Malaysia, Lebanon, Cyprus, Egypt and Iraq during elections.

=== Justice and Development Party ===
In the 3rd Justice and Development Party Ordinary Congress held in 2009, Ünal was elected to the party Central Decision Executive Committee (MKYK) and became the party's Vice President on Research and Development policy. In the same year, he became the AKP's Political Academy co-ordinator. He was not fielded as a MKYK candidate in the 4th Justice and Development Party Ordinary Congress held in 2012.

=== Member of Parliament ===
Ünal was fielded as an AKP candidate in the electoral district of Kahramanmaraş for the 2011 general election. He was subsequently elected as Member of Parliament but did not participate in the AKP government formed by party leader Recep Tayyip Erdoğan. He was re-elected as an MP in the June 2015 general election and the November 2015 general election.

=== Minister of Culture and Tourism ===
With the AKP winning a parliamentary majority in the November 2015 general election, party leader Ahmet Davutoğlu formed the 64th government of Turkey in which Ünal was appointed Minister of Culture and Tourism on 24 November 2015. He succeeded Yalçın Topçu, who had temporarily served in the position during the interim election government since August 2015.

== Personal life ==
Ünal is married with one child, and can speak Turkish, English and Arabic.

== See also ==
- Kahramanmaraş (electoral district)
