= Alcohol laws of Turkey =

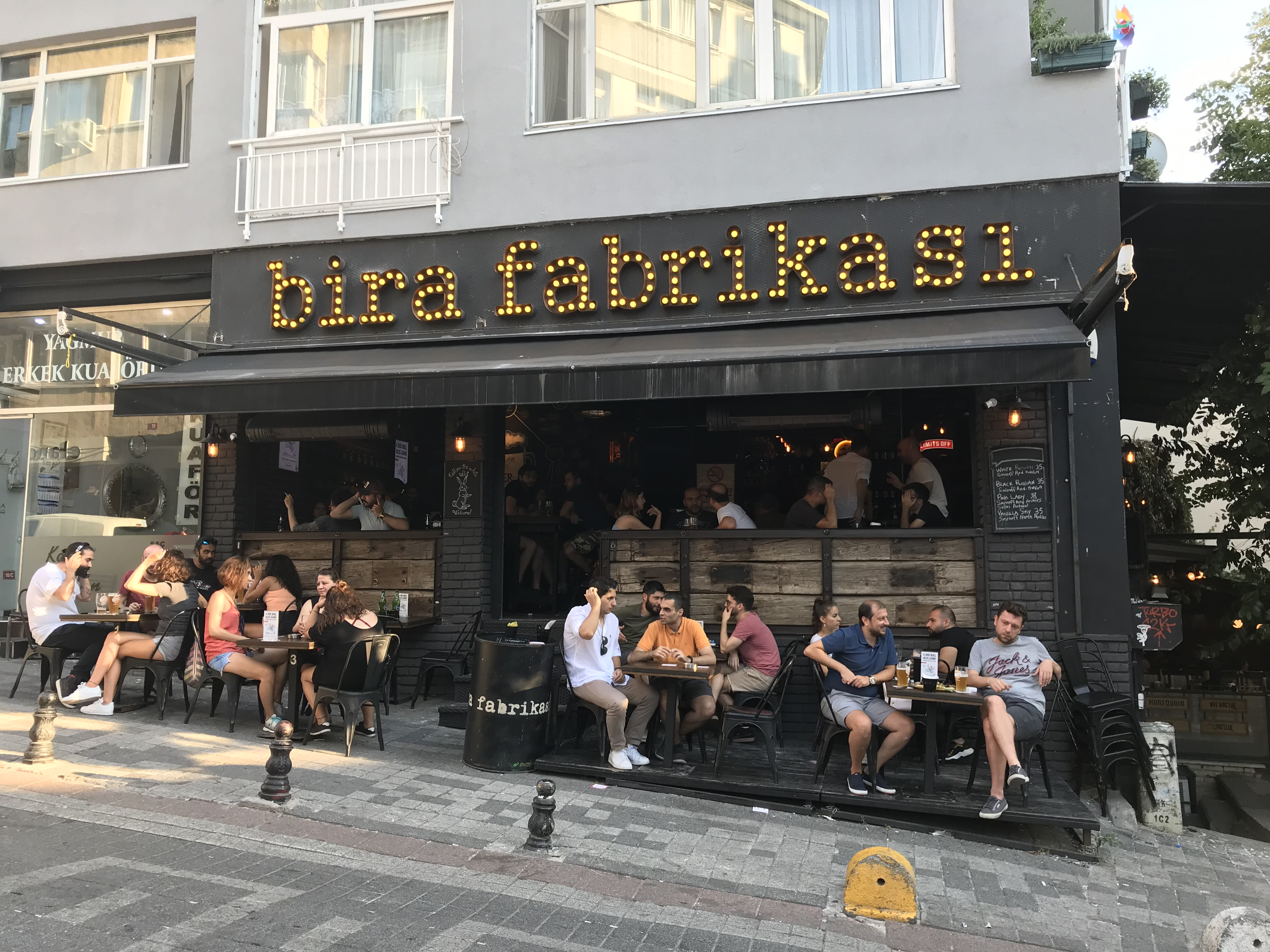
A pub in Kadıköy

Alcohol laws of Turkey regulate the sale and consumption of alcoholic beverages. Turkey is one of the few Muslim-majority countries in the world that allows alcohol consumption freely.

== Background ==
Rakı (Rakija) is a famous Balkan alcoholic beverage, and is a significant part of Turkey's food and drinking culture, a significant cultural-historical symbolic drink in many of its cities, and also the national drink of Turkey.

Alcohol consumption is just above 1.5 litres per person per year in Turkey, which is the lowest percentage in Europe by population, though there is a massive bootleg production and consumption caused by the high taxation.

Nearly 83% of Turks are teetotal but the overall usage including one-time-only experience percentage is 53%. Due to this fact, issues such as alcohol addiction (alcoholism), and other serious issues caused by this factor are a problem in the country.

== Consumption measures ==
=== Regulations ===
The laws were regulated by the Tobacco and Alcohol Market Regulatory Authority until 24 December 2017. Since then the laws are regulated by Ministry of Agriculture and Forestry of Turkey.

The sale and consumption of alcoholic beverages is age limited to persons 18 and over. A governmental act imposed in January 2011 proposed restricting the sale of alcohol at certain events to persons under 24 years of age rather than the official and legal age of 18 as it was previously established. However, the restriction was later overturned by the courts and deemed unconstitutional.

=== Drunk-driving ===
Turkey's driving under the influence law gives a blood alcohol content limit of 0.05 mg/ml and 0 for commercial drivers. Breaching the limit is punishable with a six-month driving ban.

== Sales measures ==
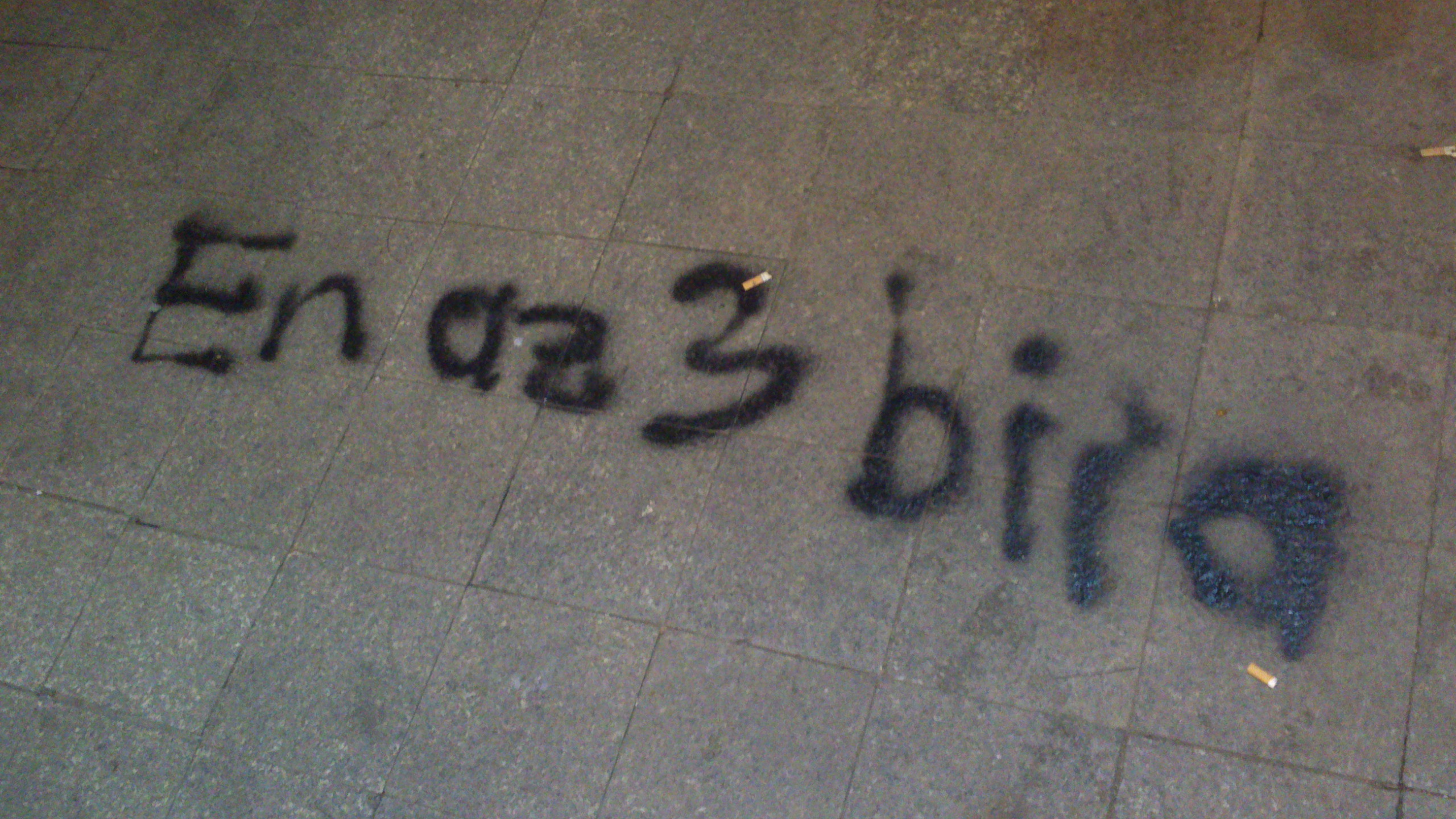
Graffiti seen during the 2013 protests in Turkey, showing the words "At least 3 beers" (Turkish: En az 3 bira), a reference to the new alcohol restrictions and Erdoğan's recommendation for families to have at least three children.

=== Licensing ===
Licenses are required in Turkey to sell or serve alcohol, including beer. Alcohol can be sold in markets only between 6 am and 10 pm, but there is no time limit in restaurants, bars, etc. Student dormitories, health institutions, sports clubs, education institutions and filling stations are prohibited from selling alcohol.

Licenses are given by the local municipalities and the Ministry of Culture and Tourism and Ministry of Health.

=== Tax ===
The high tax on the alcoholic beverages, called special consumption tax (Turkish: Özel Tüketim Vergisi or ÖTV), was established first in 2002 and dramatically increased in 2010 by the government of the Justice and Development Party, whose leadership is known for their aversion to alcohol. For instance, the increase in prices of an average rakı, a traditional Turkish alcoholic beverage, was only slightly higher than the regular inflation, 204% to 206%, from 2003 when Justice and Development Party came into the office until 2012. However, between 2013 and 2020, the average price of rakı has far more exceeded the inflation of commodity prices, 359% to 213%, due to the high tax rates.

The high taxes on alcohol is related to a significant rise in smuggling and fraud involving alcoholic beverages in the country. Bootlegging is blamed for the alcohol poisoning in Turkey, including the 2011 Turkish Riviera mass alcohol poisoning and causality of at least 67 people to methyl alcohol poisoning in October 2020.

== Advertising and promotion ==
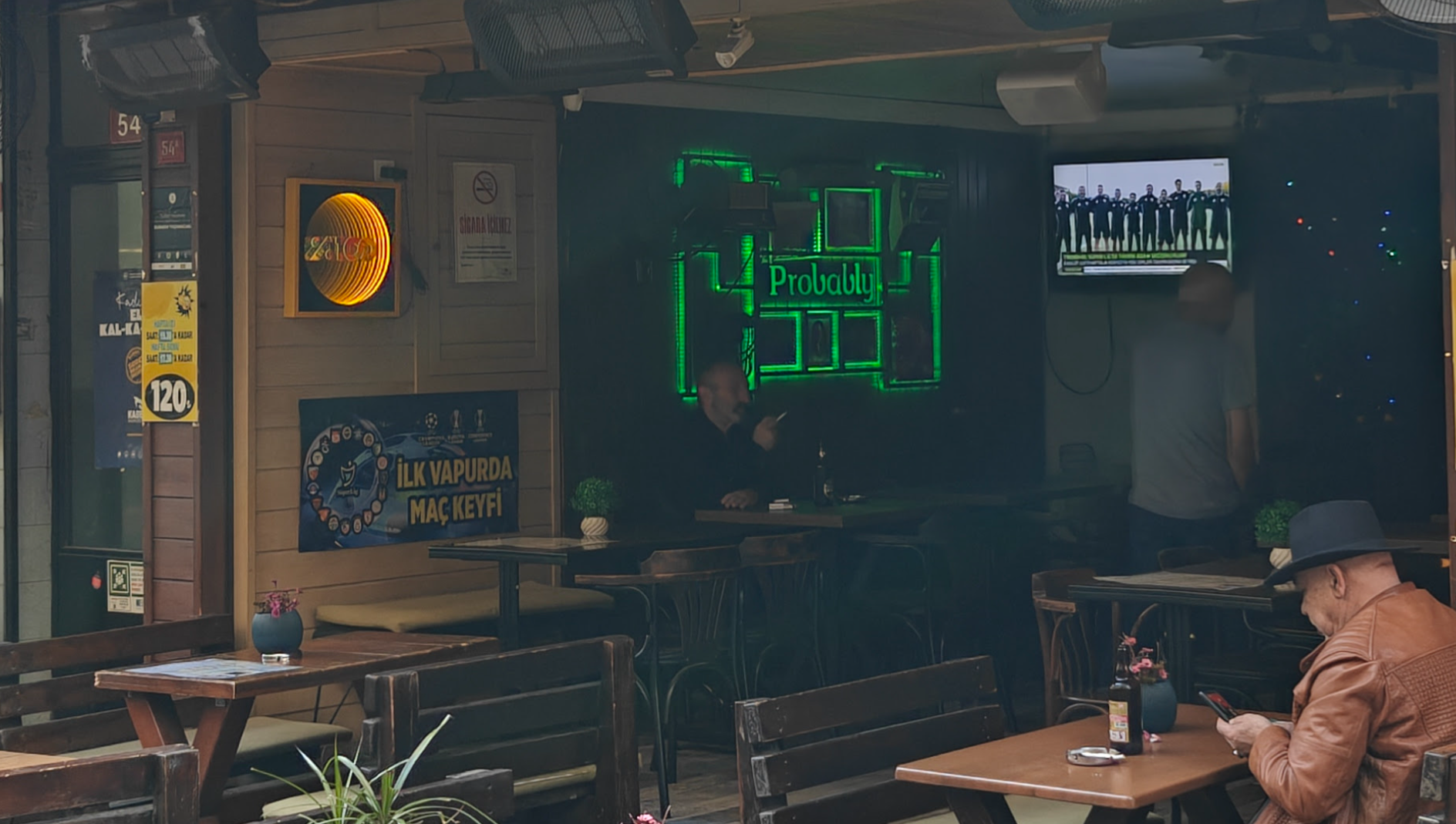
An ad in a bar in Istanbul advertising "Probably," in reference to Carlsberg's tagline "Probably the best lager in the world."

In 2013, new laws banned most forms of advertising and promotion for alcoholic beverages on radio and television, including promoting such related sponsored activities, festivals and giveaways. Beverage companies ran ads criticizing the ban.

The law also included a requirement to blur depictions of alcoholic beverages on television and in television films, as was already done for cigarettes, and for bottles to carry health warnings similar to tobacco packaging warning messages. These laws did not affect online media, and significant protest grew against the ban on platforms such as Twitter, Facebook, Ekşi Sözlük and YouTube.

A 2011 ban by the Tobacco and Alcohol Market Regulatory Authority on advertising in sports meant the basketball team Efes Pilsen S.K had to change its name and rebrand as Anadolu Efes S.K., as the name “Efes Pilsen” was a company-branch group who owned the club within the Efes company, that is a significant and popular beverage company in Turkey and around Europe, which is still the club’s owner and main sponsor as of today.

== See also ==
- Conservatism in Turkey
- Secularism in Turkey
- Smoking in Turkey
- Freedom of religion in Turkey
