= 2nd Justice and Development Party Ordinary Congress =

Party election in Turkey

2006 Justice and Development Party leadership election
- 11 November 2006
- Turnout: 1,332 delegates
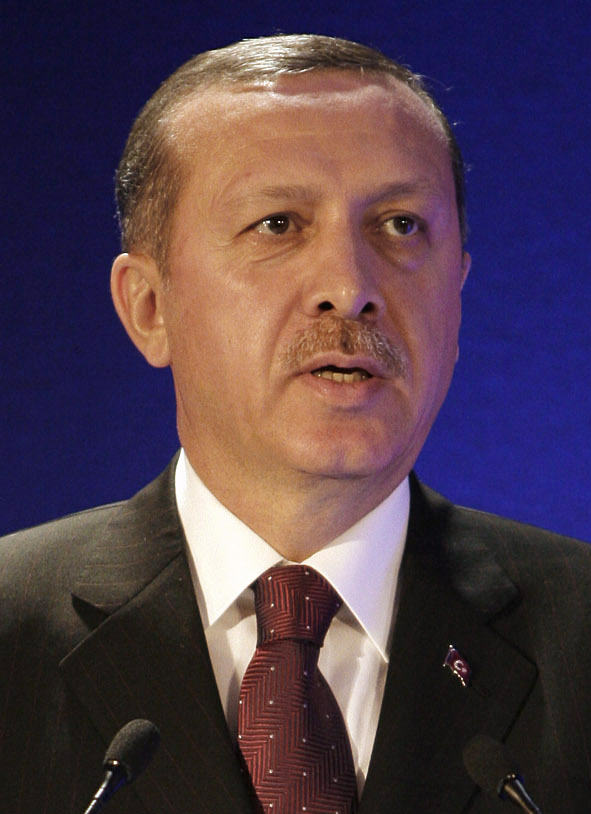
Candidate	Recep Tayyip Erdoğan
Party	AK Party
Constituency	Siirt
Delegate vote	1,330
Percentage	100%
Leader before election
Recep Tayyip Erdoğan
AK Party
Elected Leader
Recep Tayyip Erdoğan
AK Party

The 2nd Justice and Development Party Ordinary Congress was a party convention of the governing Turkish Justice and Development Party (AK Party) that took place on 11 November 2006. Elections were held for the party leader, the party Central Executive and Decision Committee (MKYK), the Central Disciplinary Committee (MDK) and the Headquarters Inner-Party Democracy Steering Committee (GMPDHK).

The AK Party's founding party leader Recep Tayyip Erdoğan stood as the only candidate for the party leadership and was re-elected as leader with 1,330 votes. Two votes were recorded as either invalid of blank. The congress was held a year before the 2007 general election, the controversial 2007 presidential election and a constitutional referendum.

== Results ==
=== Party leader ===
Candidate	Votes	Percentage
Recep Tayyip Erdoğan	1,330	100.0
Invalid/blank votes	2	–
Total	1,332	100.0
Source: AK Party

=== MKYK ===
Elected members were as follows: Dengir Mir Mehmet Fırat, Hayati Yazıcı, Necati Çetinkaya, Akif Gülle, Şaban Dişli, Nükhet Hotar Göksel, Nihat Ergün, Nazım Ekren, Şükrü Ayalan, Bülent Gedikli, Reha Denemeç, İdris Naim Şahin, Abdullah Gül, Cemal Yılmaz Demir, Abdülkadir Aksu, Abdüllatif Şener, Ahmet İnal, Murat Mercan, Ekrem Erdem, Lokman Ayva, Agah Kafkas, Ahmet Edip Uğur, Ali Babacan, Ayşe Böhürler, Beşir Atalay, Cemil Çiçek, Cüneyd Zapsu, Hüseyin Tanrıverdi, Altan Karapaşaoğlu, Muzaffer Gülyurt, Ömer Çelik, Öznur Çalık, Sabahattin Cevheri, Semiha Öyüş, Serap Yahşi Yaşar, Tevhit Karakaya, Egemen Bağış, Fatma Şahin, Güldal Akşit, Orhan Yegin, Çiğdem Özkal, Edibe Sözen, Haluk İpek, Hasan Angı, Lale Ersoy, Necdet Budak, Sait Yazıcıoğlu, Necla Hattapoğlu, Sema Özdemir, Zelkif Kazdal.

Elected reserve members were as follows: Avni Doğan, Bekir Bozdağ, Hüsnü Ordu, Pervim Turan, Zülfü Demirbağ, Ahmat Büyükakkaşlar, Tevfik Akbak, Nur Özkaya, Fikret Dönmez, Ali Sürücü, Saffet Benli, İ.Rıza Yazıcıoğlu, Recep Garip, Ali Osman Sali, Zülfikar İzol, Selahattin Dağ, Selami Uzun, Hasan Ali Çelik, Zeki Karabayır, Mehmet Ceylan, Ahmet Yaşar, Mehmet Güner, Murat Yılmazer, Durdu Mehmet Kastal, Murteza Tamyürek.

=== MDK ===
Elected members were as follows: Belma Sekmen Satır, Enver Yılmaz, Hakkı Köylü, İsmail Safi, Kemalettin Göktaş, Mehmet Ali Bulut, İhsan Arslan, Muammer Kakı, Mustafa Ünal, Ramazan Toprak, Remziye Öztoprak

Elected reserve members were as follows: Muzaffer Baştopçu, Rıdvan Köybaşı, Orhan Yıldız, Osman Kılıç, M.Faruk Bayrak.

=== GMPDHK ===
Elected members were as follows: Fehmi Uyanık, Mustafa Zeydan ve Nurdoğan Topaloğlu

Elected reserve members were as follows: Ziyaettin Yağcı, Mücahit Daloğlu
