= 6th Justice and Development Party Ordinary Congress =

Justice and Development Party leadership election, 2018
← 2017	18 August 2018	2021 →
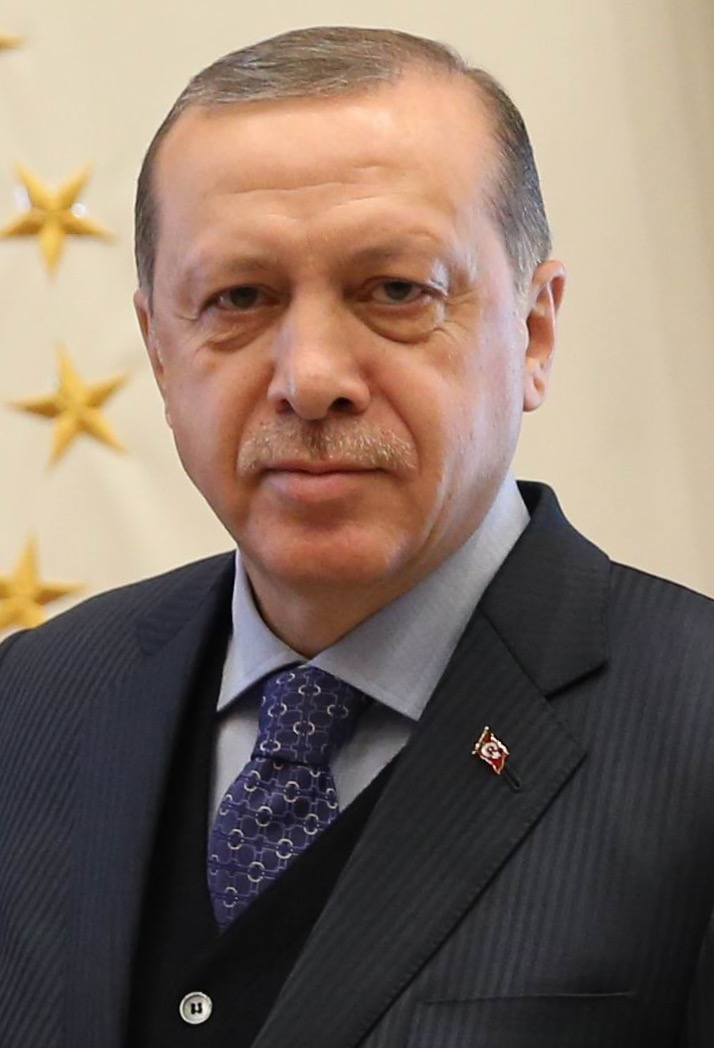
Candidate	Recep Tayyip Erdoğan
Party	AK Party
Delegate votes	1,380
Percentage	99.92%
Leader before election
Recep Tayyip Erdoğan
AK Party
Elected Leader
Recep Tayyip Erdoğan
AK Party

The 6th Justice and Development Party Ordinary Congress took place on 18 August 2018 in order to elect a party leader and members to the party congress of Turkey's ruling Justice and Development Party (AK Party).
