= 3rd Justice and Development Party Extraordinary Congress =

Election in Turkey

Justice and Development Party leadership election, 2017
← 2016	20–21 May 2017	2018 →
- Registered: 1,470 delegates
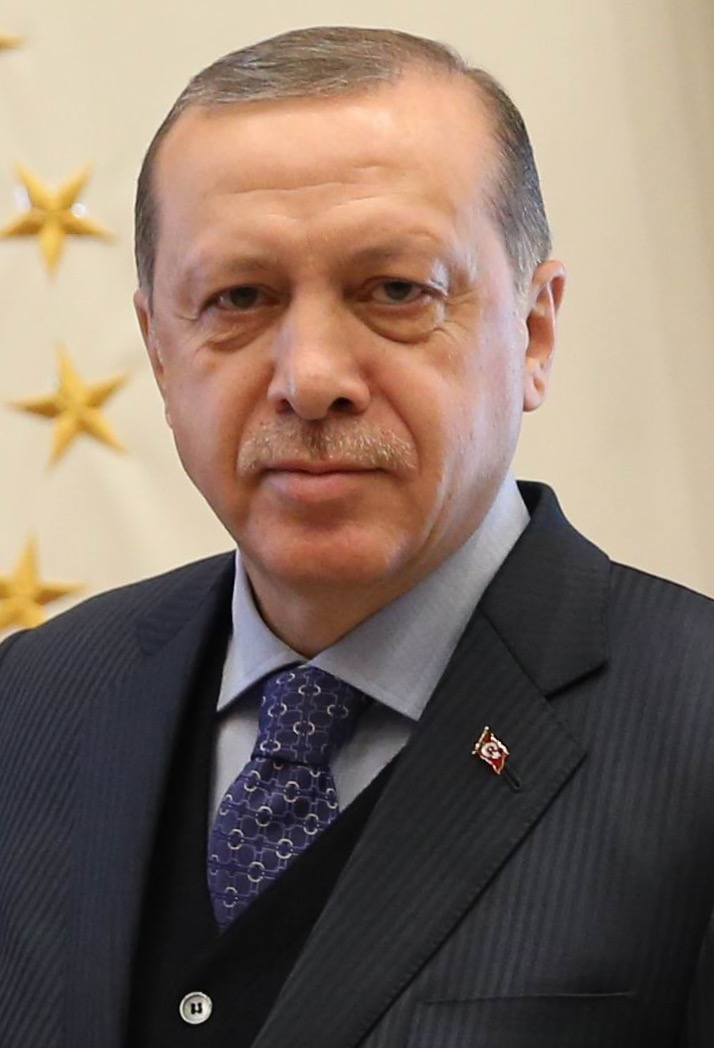
Candidate	Recep Tayyip Erdoğan
Party	AK Party
Delegate vote	1,414
Percentage	100%
Leader before election
Binali Yıldırım
AK Party
Elected Leader
Recep Tayyip Erdoğan
AK Party

The 3rd Justice and Development Party Extraordinary Congress took place on 20 and 21 May 2017 in order to elect a party leader and members to the party congress of Turkey's ruling Justice and Development Party (AK Party). The party's founder and first leader, Recep Tayyip Erdoğan, was the only candidate for the post, having left the leadership upon his election as President in 2014. Having been initially required to sever his political party relations on grounds of impartiality, a constitutional referendum in 2017 turned Turkey into an executive presidency, allowing Erdoğan to return to the AK Party and become its leader.

== Parliamentary group leader election ==
Three days after the congress concluded, the parliamentary group of the AKP met to elect a new parliamentary group leader in order to conform to the executive presidential system. The party's outgoing leader Binali Yıldırım, who vacated the leadership for Erdoğan, was elected unopposed with 300 votes out of 316 voting-elibile members of parliament.

== See also ==
- 2017 Turkish constitutional referendum
- 2019 Turkish presidential election
