= 4th Justice and Development Party Ordinary Congress =

Party election in Turkey

2012 Justice and Development Party leadership election
- 30 September 2012
- Registered: 1,489 delegates
- Turnout: 95.63%
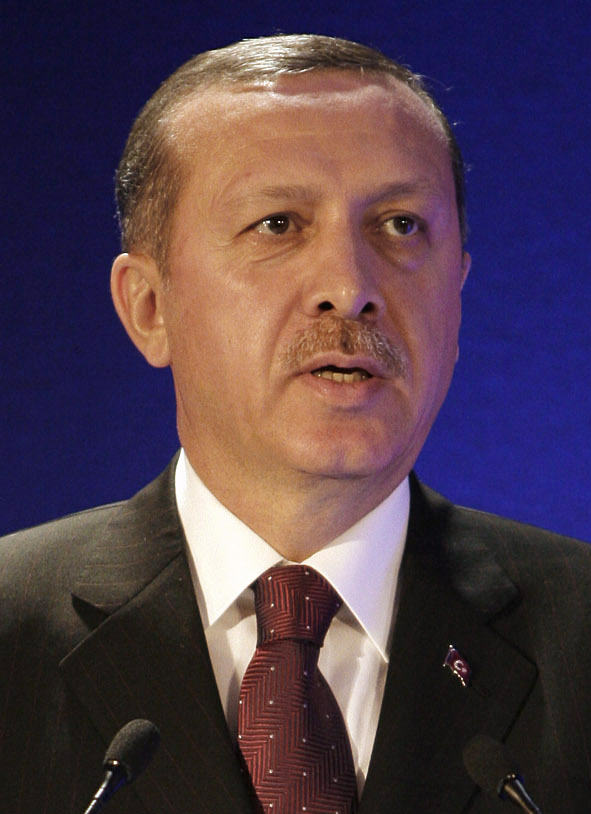
Candidate	Recep Tayyip Erdoğan
Party	AK Party
Constituency	İstanbul (I)
Delegate vote	1,421
Percentage	100%
Leader before election
Recep Tayyip Erdoğan
AK Party
Elected Leader
Recep Tayyip Erdoğan
AK Party

The 4th Justice and Development Party Ordinary Congress was a party convention of the governing Turkish Justice and Development Party (AK Party) that took place on 30 September 2012. The congress mainly centred on the Kurdish–Turkish conflict.

The AKP's founding party leader Recep Tayyip Erdoğan stood as the only candidate for the party leadership, with 1,489 registered delegates voting in the election. Erdoğan was re-elected as leader with 1,421 votes. The congress was held a year after the AK Party's third consecutive landslide victory in the 2011 general election.

== Date and venue ==
The congress was held in the Ankara Arena, which is widely used for political party conferences in Turkey. The date of 30 September 2012 was set due to the AKP's usual timetable of holding its conventions in the Autumn every three years. The previous ordinary congress took place in 2009.

== Agenda ==
The agenda was dominated by the AKP's anti-terrorism propaganda, with the Kurdish–Turkish conflict having claimed the lives of several Turkish soldiers in recent months. Erdoğan's speech contained numerous poems, which drew tears from attendants at the congress according to press reports. Erdoğan's speech also contained attacks against the main opposition Republican People's Party, which he accused of 'playing a role in every coup'.

== Leadership election ==
=== Candidates ===
- Recep Tayyip Erdoğan, Prime Minister of Turkey since 2003

=== Results ===
Candidate	Votes	Percentage
Recep Tayyip Erdoğan	1,421	100.0
Invalid/blank votes	3	–
Total	1,424	100.0
Number of delegates/turnout	1,489	95.6
Source: Milliyet

== See also ==
- 2014 Justice and Development Party Extraordinary Congress
