= Tobacco and Alcohol Market Regulatory Authority =

Turkish government organization (2002–2017)

- Abbreviation: TAPDK

Agency overview
- Formed: 9 January 2002
- Dissolved: 24 December 2017

Jurisdictional structure
- Operations jurisdiction: Turkey

The Tobacco and Alcohol Market Regulatory Authority (Turkish: Tütün ve Alkol Piyasası Düzenleme Kurumu, TAPDK) was a government organization in Turkey with responsibility for regulation of smoking in Turkey and enforcement of alcohol laws of Turkey.

TAPDK was dissolved on 24 December 2017 and its authority transferred to the Ministry of Agriculture and Forestry of Turkey.
