= 3rd Justice and Development Party Ordinary Congress =

Party election in Turkey

2009 Justice and Development Party leadership election
- 3 October 2009
- Registered: 1,463 delegates
- Turnout: 1,363 (93.16%)
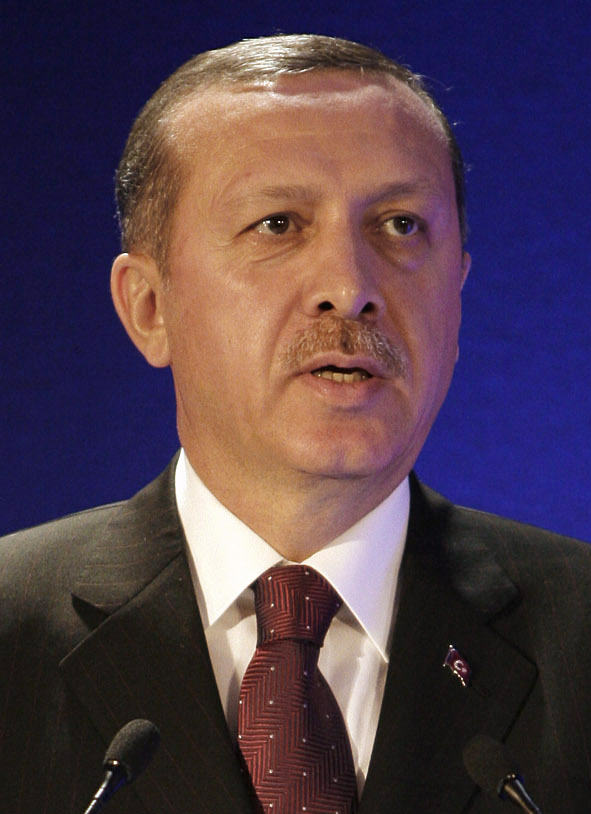
Candidate	Recep Tayyip Erdoğan
Party	AK Party
Constituency	İstanbul (I)
Delegate vote	1,362
Percentage	100%
Leader before election
Recep Tayyip Erdoğan
AK Party
Elected Leader
Recep Tayyip Erdoğan
AK Party

The 3rd Justice and Development Party Ordinary Congress was a party convention of the governing Turkish Justice and Development Party (AK Party) that took place on 3 October 2009.

The AK Party's founding party leader Recep Tayyip Erdoğan stood as the only candidate for the party leadership, with 1,463 registered delegates voting in the election. Erdoğan was re-elected as leader with 1,362 votes. The congress was held seven months after the AK Party emerged as the first party in the 29 March 2009 local elections.

== Date and venue ==
The congress was held in the ASKI Sport Hall in the capital city of Ankara. The date of 3 October 2009 was set due to the AKP's usual timetable of holding its conventions in the Autumn every three years. The previous ordinary congress took place in 2006.

== Agenda ==
The agenda widely centred on the AKP's policy of 'democratisation', which aimed to win over many Kurdish supporters in the south-east of Turkey through more inclusive policies that increase said citizen's rights as a minority. The main opposition Republican People's Party (CHP) did not send an observer, though other smaller parties were represented at the congress. During his speech, it was observed that Erdoğan did not read out a pre-written script containing criticism of the Kurdish nationalist Democratic Society Party (DTP).

In a propaganda film featuring Erdoğan's overseas trips as Prime Minister, the crowd only applauded footage that showed US President Barack Obama. Both German Chancellor Angela Merkel and the Ukrainian Prime Minister Yulia Tymoshenko sent messages of support to the congress.

== Leadership election ==
=== Candidates ===
- Recep Tayyip Erdoğan, Prime Minister of Turkey since 2003

=== Results ===
Candidate	Votes	Percentage
Recep Tayyip Erdoğan	1,362	100.0
Invalid/blank votes	1	–
Total	1,363	100.0
Number of delegates/turnout	1,463	93.2
Source: NTV

== Central Decision Executive Board election ==
The following members were elected to the Central Decision Executive Board (MKYK). The number of votes they received is shown in brackets.

- Abdulkadir Aksu (1216)
- Agah Kafkas (1196)
- Ahmet Davutoğlu (1243)
- Ahmet Edip Uğur (1238)
- Ali Babacan (1242)
- Asuman Erdoğan (1237)
- Ayşe Böhürler (1217)
- Ayşe Türkmenoğlu (1220)
- Beşir Atalay (1239)
- Bülent Arınç (1243)
- Bülent Gedikli (1241)
- Cemal Yılmazdemir (1223)
- Cemil Çiçek (1231)
- Çiğdem Özkal (1240)
- Edibe Sözen (1234)
- Ekrem Erdem (1241)
- Emine Çift (1240)
- Fatma Selma Kotan (1230)
- Haluk İpek (1181)
- Hasan Ali Çelik (1242)
- Hayati Yazıcı (1232)
- Hüseyin Çelik (1229)
- Hüseyin Tanrıverdi (1214)
- İdris Naim Şahin (1221)
- Kürşad Tüzmen (1234)
- Lale Ersoy (1242)
- Lokman Ayva (1242)
- Said Yazıcıoğlu (1241)
- Mahir Ünal (1242)
- Mazhar Bağlı (1234)
- Mehmet Müezzinoğlu (1231)
- Mehmet Oymak (1239)
- Mutlu Alkan Kütüklüoğlu (1231)
- Muzaffer Gülyurt (1241)
- Necati Çetinkaya (1216)
- Necdet Budak (1242)
- Necla Hattapoğlu (1241)
- Nükhet Hotar (1229)
- Orhan Yeğin (1240)
- Ömer Çelik (1232)
- Öznur Çalık (1233)
- Reha Denemeç (1240)
- Sadık Badak (1239)
- Salih Kapusuz (1235)
- Sema Özdemir (1240)
- Suat Kınıklıoğlu (1237)
- Şükrü Ayalan (1228)
- Tevhit Karakaya (1237)
- Zelkif Kazdal (1235)
- Zeynep Karahan Uslu (1237).

== See also ==
- 2014 Justice and Development Party Extraordinary Congress
