= Justice and Development Party =

Conservative political party in Turkey

Justice and Development Party Adalet ve Kalkınma Partisi
- Abbreviation: AK Party (English); AK PARTİ (Note: "AK PARTİ" (in all capital letters) is the self-declared abbreviation of the name of the party, as stated in Article 3 of the party charter, while "AKP" is mostly preferred by its opponents; the supporters prefer "AK PARTİ" since the word "ak" in Turkish means "white", "clean", or "unblemished", lending a positive impression. The Chief Public Prosecutor of the Supreme Court of Appeals initially used "AKP", but after an objection from the party, "AKP" was replaced with "Adalet ve Kalkınma Partisi" (without abbreviation) in documents.) (Turkish); AKP (unofficial)
- Leader: Recep Tayyip Erdoğan
- General Secretary: Eyyüp Kadir İnan
- Spokesperson: Ömer Çelik
- Parliamentary leader: Abdullah Güler
- Founders: Recep Tayyip Erdoğan; Abdullah Gül; Bülent Arınç
- Founded: 14 August 2001; 25 years ago
- Split from: Virtue Party
- Headquarters: Söğütözü Caddesi No 6 Çankaya, Ankara
- Youth wing: AK Youth
- Membership (2026): ▲11,709,913
- Ideology: Erdoğanism; National conservatism; Social conservatism; Right-wing populism; Neo-Ottomanism
- Political position: Right-wing
- National affiliation: People's Alliance
- European affiliation: EPP (observer, 2005–2013); AECR (2013–2018)
- Colours: Orange; Blue; White
- Grand National Assembly: 280 / 600
- Metropolitan municipalities: 13 / 30
- Provinces: 13 / 51
- District municipalities: 390 / 922
- Belde Municipalities: 198 / 390
- Provincial councilors: 592 / 1,282
- Municipal Assemblies: 8,178 / 20,953

Website
- www.akparti.org.tr

The Justice and Development Party (Turkish: Adalet ve Kalkınma Partisi [adaːˈlet ve kaɫkɯnˈma paɾtiˈsi], AK PARTİ), abbreviated officially as AK Party in English, is a political party in Turkey. It has been the ruling party of Turkey since 2002. Third-party sources often refer to the party as national conservative, social conservative, right-wing populist and as espousing neo-Ottomanism. The party is generally regarded as being right-wing on the political spectrum, although some sources have described it as far-right since 2011. It is currently the largest party in Grand National Assembly with 280 MPs, ahead of the main opposition social democratic New Party (YENİ Parti).

Recep Tayyip Erdoğan has been chairman of the AKP since the 2017 Party Congress. The AKP is the largest party in the Grand National Assembly, the Turkish national legislature, with 268 out of 600 seats, having won 35.6% of votes in the 2023 Turkish parliamentary election. It forms the People's Alliance with the far-right Nationalist Movement Party (MHP). The current parliamentary leader of the AKP is Abdullah Güler.

Founded in 2001 by members of a number of parties such as FP, MHP, ANAP and DYP, the party has a strong base of support among people from the right-wing tradition of Turkey. The party positioned itself as pro-liberal market economy, supporting Turkish membership in the European Union. Orange is the party's main colour. Other colours include white for the logo, blue for the flag, and orange-white-blue-red for the corporate design.

The AKP is the only party in Turkey with a significant presence in all provinces of Turkey. Since the beginning of Turkey's multiparty democracy in 1946, the AKP is the only party to win seven consecutive parliamentary elections. The AKP has headed the national government since 2002 under Abdullah Gül (2002–2003), Recep Tayyip Erdoğan (2003–2014), Ahmet Davutoğlu (2014–2016), Binali Yıldırım (2016–2018) and Recep Tayyip Erdoğan (2018–present). The AKP's rule has been marked with increasing authoritarianism, expansionism, censorship and banning of other political parties and dissent.

The party was an observer in the European People's Party between 2005 and 2013. After not being granted full membership in the EPP, the party became a member of the Alliance of Conservatives and Reformists in Europe (ACRE) from 2013 to 2018.

AKP has dominated Turkish politics since 2002. It is the tenth-largest political party in the world by membership.

== History ==
=== Formation ===
The AKP was established by a wide range of politicians of various political parties and a number of new politicians in 2001. The core of the party was formed from the reformist faction of the Islamist Virtue Party, including people such as Abdullah Gül and Bülent Arınç, while a second founding group consisted of members of the social conservative Motherland Party who had been close to Turgut Özal, such as Cemil Çiçek and Abdülkadir Aksu. Historically the party was described as liberal conservative, conservative liberal, economically liberal, pro-European, and center-right.

Some members of the True Path Party, such as Hüseyin Çelik and Köksal Toptan, joined the AKP. Some members, such as Kürşad Tüzmen or Ertuğrul Günay, had nationalist or center-left backgrounds respectively, while representatives of the nascent, more clearly anti-capitalist 'Muslim left' current were largely excluded. In addition, a large number of people joined a political party for the first time, such as Ali Babacan, Nimet Baş, Egemen Bağış and Mevlüt Çavuşoğlu.

=== Closure cases ===
Controversies over whether the party remains committed to secular principles enshrined in the Turkish constitution have dominated Turkish politics since 2002. Turkey's constitution established the country as a secular state and prohibits any political parties that promote Islamism or shariah law.

Since coming to power, the party has brought about tighter regulations on abortion and higher taxes on alcohol consumption, leading to allegations that it is covertly undermining Turkish secularism. Some activists, commentators, opponents and government officials have accused the party of Islamism. The Justice and Development Party has faced two "closure cases" (attempts to officially ban the party, usually for Islamist practices) in 2002 and 2008.

Just 10 days before the national elections of 2002, Turkey's chief prosecutor, Sabih Kanadoğlu, asked the Turkish constitutional court to close the Justice and Development Party, which was leading in the polls at that time. The chief prosecutor charged the Justice and Development Party with abusing the law and justice. He based his case on the fact that the party's leader had been banned from political life for reading an Islamist poem, and thus the party had no standing in elections. The European Commission had previously criticized Turkey for banning the party's leader from participating in elections.

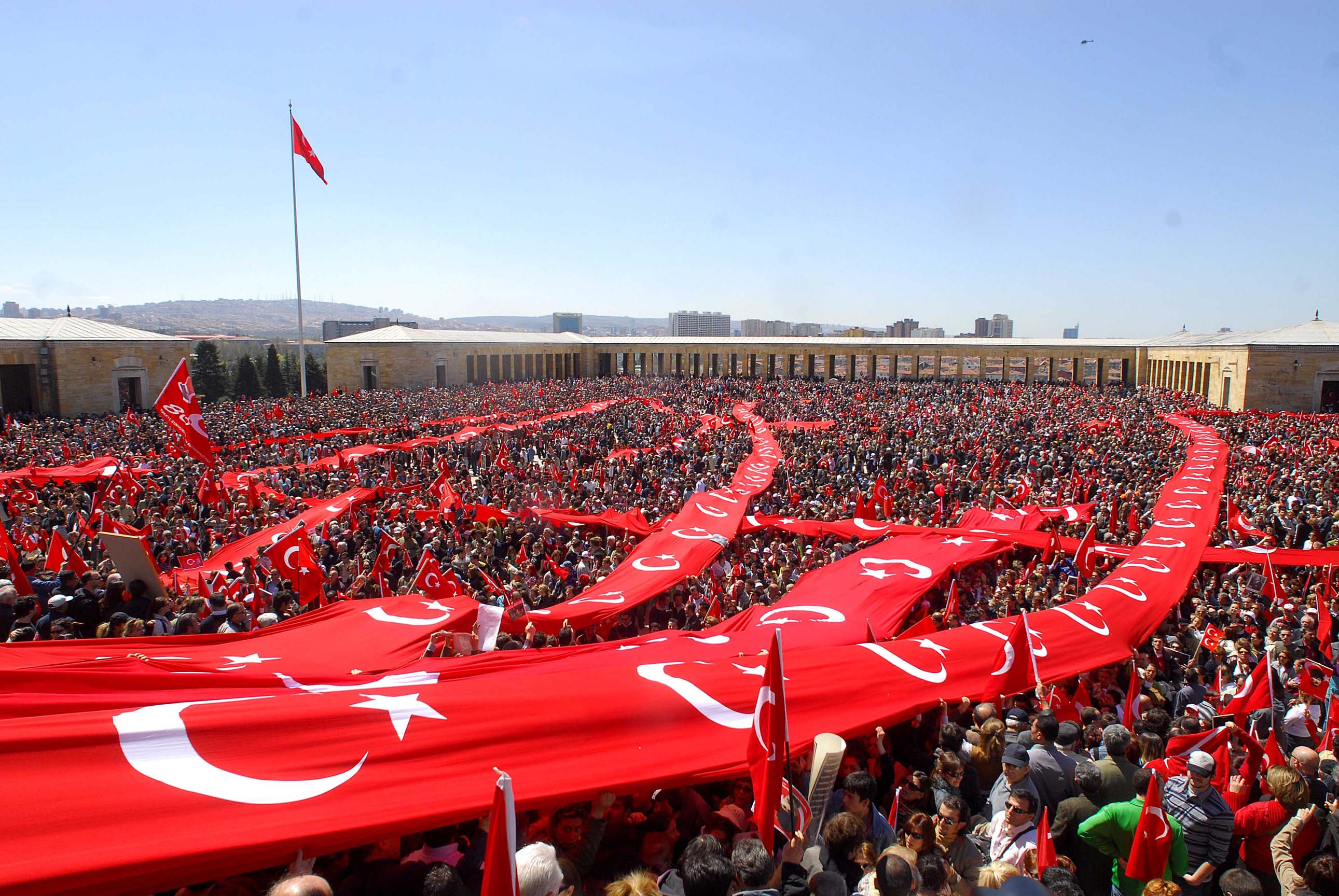
The Republic Protests took place in 2007 in support of the Kemalist reforms, particularly state secularism and democracy, against the perceived Islamization of Turkey under the ruling Justice and Development Party.

The party again faced a closure trial in 2008 brought about by the lifting of a long-standing university ban on headscarves. At an international press conference in Spain, Erdoğan answered a question of a journalist by saying, "What if the headscarf is a symbol? Even if it were a political symbol, does that give [one the] right to ban it? Could you bring prohibitions to symbols?" These statements led to a joint proposal of the Justice and Development Party and the far-right Nationalist Movement Party for changing the constitution and the law to lift a ban on women wearing headscarves at state universities.

Soon afterwards, Turkey's chief prosecutor, Abdurrahman Yalçınkaya, asked the Constitutional Court of Turkey to close down the party on charges of violating the separation of religion and state in Turkey. The closure request failed by only one vote, as only six of the 11 judges ruled in favor, with seven required; however, 10 out of 11 judges agreed that the Justice and Development Party had become "a center for anti-secular activities", leading to a loss of 50% of the state funding for the party.

=== Elections ===
The party has won pluralities in the seven most recent legislative elections, those of 2002, 2007, 2011, June 2015, November 2015, 2018 and 2023. The party held a majority of seats for 13 years, but lost it in June 2015, only to regain it in the snap election of November 2015 but then lose it again in 2018. Its past electoral success has been mirrored in the three local elections held since the party's establishment, coming first in 2004, 2009 and 2014 respectively. However, the party lost most of Turkey's biggest cities including Istanbul and Ankara in 2019 local elections, which has been attributed to the Turkish economic crisis, accusations of authoritarianism, as well as alleged government inaction on the Syrian refugee crisis.

==== 2002 general elections ====
The AKP won a sweeping victory in the 2002 elections, which saw every party previously represented in the Grand National Assembly ejected from the chamber. In the process, it won a two-thirds majority of seats, becoming the first Turkish party in 11 years to win an outright majority. Erdoğan, as the leader of the biggest party in parliament, would have been normally given the task to form a cabinet.

However, according to the Turkish Constitution Article 109 the prime ministers had to be also a representative of the Turkish Parliament. Erdoğan, who was banned from holding any political office after a 1994 incident in which he read a poem deemed pro-Islamist by judges, was therefore not. As a result, Gül became prime minister.

It survived the crisis over the 2003 invasion of Iraq despite a massive back bench rebellion where over a hundred AKP MPs joined those of the opposition Republican People's Party (CHP) in parliament to prevent the government from allowing the United States to launch a Northern offensive in Iraq from Turkish territory. Later, Erdoğan's ban was lifted with the help of the CHP and Erdoğan became prime minister by being elected to the parliament after a by-election in Siirt.

The AKP has undertaken structural reforms, and during its rule Turkey has seen rapid growth and an end to its three decade long period of high inflation rates. Inflation had fallen to 8.8% by 2004.

Influential business publications such as The Economist consider the AKP's government the most successful in Turkey in decades.

==== 2004 local elections ====
In the local elections of 2004, the AKP won 42% of the votes, making inroads against the secular Republican People's Party (CHP) on the South and West Coasts, and against the Social Democratic People's Party, which is supported by some Kurds in the South-East of Turkey.

In January 2005, the AKP was admitted as an observer member in the European People's Party (EPP). However, it left the EPP to join the Alliance of European Conservatives and Reformists (AECR) in 2013.

==== 2007 elections ====
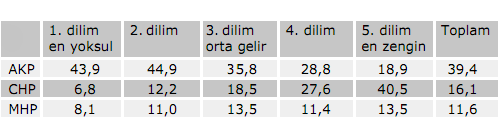
Voter base by monthly household income. AKP is the largest party in group 1, 2, 3 and 4, while CHP is the largest in group 5, the richest 20% of Turkey.

On 14 April 2007, an estimated 300,000 people marched in Ankara to protest the possible candidacy of Erdoğan in the 2007 presidential election, afraid that if elected as president, he would alter the secular nature of the Turkish state. Erdoğan announced on 24 April 2007 that the party had decided to nominate Abdullah Gül as the AKP candidate in the presidential election. The protests continued over the next several weeks, with over one million reported at an 29 April rally in Istanbul, tens of thousands reported at separate protests on 4 May in Manisa and Çanakkale, and one million in İzmir on 13 May.

Early parliamentary elections were called after the failure of the parties in parliament to agree on the next Turkish president. The opposition parties boycotted the parliamentary vote and deadlocked the election process. At the same time, Erdoğan claimed the failure to elect a president was a failure of the Turkish political system and proposed to modify the constitution.

The AKP achieved a significant victory in the rescheduled 22 July 2007 elections with 46.6% of the vote, translating into control of 341 of the 550 available parliamentary seats. Although the AKP received significantly more votes in 2007 than in 2002, the number of parliamentary seats they controlled decreased due to the rules of the Turkish electoral system. However, they retained a comfortable ruling majority.

Nationally, the elections of 2007 saw a major advance for the AKP, with the party outpolling the pro-Kurdish Democratic Society Party in traditional Kurdish strongholds such as Van and Mardin, as well as outpolling the secular-left CHP in traditionally secular areas such as Antalya and Artvin. Overall, the AKP secured a plurality of votes in 68 of Turkey's 81 provinces, with its strongest vote of 71% coming from Bingöl. Its weakest vote, a mere 12%, came from Tunceli, the only Turkish province where the Alevi form a majority. Abdullah Gül was elected as the president in late August with 339 votes in the third round – the first at which a simple majority is required – after deadlock in the first two rounds, in which a two-thirds majority was needed.

==== 2007 constitutional referendum ====
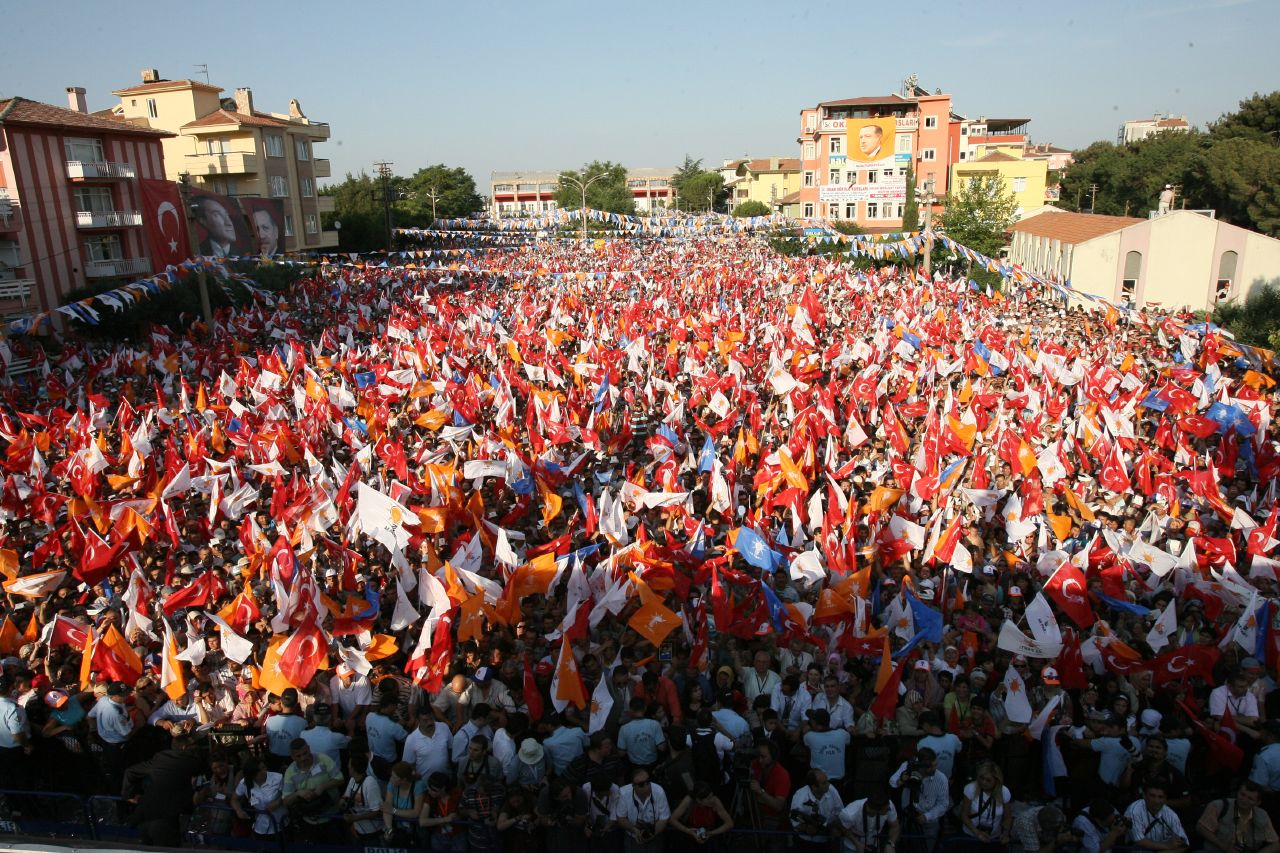
A rally of the Justice and Development Party in 2007

After the opposition parties deadlocked the 2007 presidential election by boycotting the parliament, the ruling AKP proposed a constitutional reform package. The reform package was first vetoed by President Sezer. Then he applied to the Turkish constitutional court about the reform package, because the president is unable to veto amendments for the second time. The court did not find any problems in the package and 69% of the voters supported the constitutional changes.

The reforms consisted of:

- electing the president by popular vote instead of by parliament;
- reducing the presidential term from seven years to five;
- allowing the president to stand for re-election for a second term;
- holding general elections every four years instead of five;
- reducing the quorum of lawmakers needed for parliamentary decisions from 367 to 184.

==== 2009 local elections ====
The 2009 Turkish local elections took place in March 2009, during the Great Recession. After the success of the AKP in the 2007 general elections, the party saw a decline in the 2009 Turkish local elections. In these elections the AKP received 39% of the vote, 3% less than in the local elections of 2004. Still, the AKP remained the dominating party in Turkey. The second party CHP received 23% of the vote and the third party MHP received 16% of the vote. The AKP won in Turkey's largest cities: Ankara and Istanbul.

==== 2010 constitutional referendum ====
Reforming the Constitution was one of the main pledges of the AKP during the 2007 election campaign. The main opposition party CHP was not interested in altering the Constitution on a big scale, making it impossible to form a Constitutional Commission (Anayasa Uzlaşma Komisyonu). The amendments lacked the two-thirds majority needed to instantly become law, but secured 336 votes in the 550 seat parliament – enough to put the proposals to a referendum.

The reform package included a number of issues: such as the right of individuals to appeal to the highest court, the creation of the ombudsman's office, the possibility to negotiate a nationwide labour contract, positive exceptions for female citizens, the ability of civilian courts to convict members of the military, the right of civil servants to go on strike, a privacy law, and the structure of the Constitutional Court. The referendum was agreed by a majority of 58%.

==== 2014 elections ====
In the presidential election of 2014, the AKP's long time leader Recep Tayyip Erdoğan was elected president. In the party's first extraordinary congress, former foreign minister Ahmet Davutoğlu was unanimously elected unopposed as party leader and took over as prime minister on 28 August 2014. Davutoğlu stepped down as prime minister on 4 May 2016 following policy disagreements with President Erdoğan. Presidential aide Cemil Ertem said to Turkish TV that the country and its economy would stabilize further "when a prime minister more closely aligned with President Erdoğan takes office".

==== June 2015 general election ====
In the general election held on 7 June, the AKP gained 40.87% of the vote and 258 seats in the Grand National Assembly of Turkey (Turkish: Türkiye Büyük Millet Meclisi, TBMM). Though it still remains the biggest party in Turkey, the AKP lost its status as the majority party and the power to form a single-party government. Until then it had held this majority without interruption for 13 years since it had come to power in 2002. In this election, the AKP was pushing to gain 330 seats in the Grand National Assembly so that it could put a series of constitutional changes to a referendum, one of them was to switch Turkey from the current parliamentary government to an American-style executive presidency government.

This pursuit met with a series of oppositions and criticism from the opposition parties and their supporters, fearing the measure would give more unchecked power to the current President of Turkey Recep Tayyip Erdoğan, who has drawn fierce criticisms both from home and abroad for his active role in the election, abandoning the traditional presidential role of maintaining a more neutral and impartial position in elections by his predecessors in the office. The result of the Kurdish issues-centered Peoples' Democratic Party, HDP, breaking through the 10% threshold to achieve 13.12% out of the total votes cast and gaining 80 seats in the Grand National Assembly in the election, which caused the AKP to lose its parliamentary majority.

==== 2019 local elections ====
In the 2019 local elections, the ruling party AKP lost control of Istanbul and Ankara for the first time in 15 years, as well as five of Turkey's six largest cities. The loss has been widely attributed to AKP's mismanagement of the Turkish economic crisis, rising authoritarianism as well as alleged government inaction on the Syrian refugee crisis. Soon after the elections, the Turkish government ordered a re-election in Istanbul. The decision led to a downfall on AKP's popularity and it lost the elections again in June with an even greater margin.

The result was seen as a huge blow to Erdoğan, who had once said that if his party 'lost Istanbul, we would lose Turkey.' The opposition's landslide was characterized as the 'beginning of the end' for Erdoğan, with international commentators calling the re-run a huge government miscalculation that can lead to a potential İmamoğlu candidacy in the next scheduled presidential election. It is suspected that the scale of the government's defeat could provoke a cabinet reshuffle and early general elections, currently scheduled for June 2023.

==== 2023 general election ====
In the 2023 Turkish parliamentary election the Justice and Development Party stood no female candidates in 30 provinces.

==== 2024 local elections ====
This was the first nationwide election since 1977 where the CHP came first in the popular vote, and the first election where the AKP did not come first since its foundation in 2001. Nevertheless, the AKP retained a narrow plurality in the number of district mayoralties won due to their alliance with the Nationalist Movement Party in the People's Alliance. The AKP achieved 16,339,771 votes or 35.49% of the vote and lost 15 district mayoralties. Some key mayoralties lost in this election include Bursa, Denizli and Giresun to the CHP and Ağrı and Muş to the DEM.

== Ideology and policies ==
Although the party is described as an Islamist party in some media, party officials reject those claims. According to former minister Hüseyin Çelik, "In the Western press, when the AKP administration – the ruling party of the Turkish Republic – is being named, most of the time 'Islamic', 'Islamist', 'mildly Islamist', 'Islamic-oriented,' 'Islamic-based' or 'with an Islamic agenda', and similar language is being used. These characterizations do not reflect the truth, and they sadden us". Çelik added, "The AKP is a conservative democratic party. The AKP's conservatism is limited to moral and social issues". Also in a separate speech made in 2005, Prime Minister Recep Tayyip Erdoğan stated, "We are not an Islamic party, and we also refuse labels such as Muslim-democrat." Erdogan went on to say that the AKP's agenda is limited to "conservative democracy".

On the other hand, according to at least one observer (Mustafa Akyol), under the AKP government of Recep Tayyip Erdoğan, starting in 2007, "hundreds of secularist officers and their civilian allies" were jailed, and by 2012 the "old secularist guard" in positions of authority was replaced by members/supporters of the AKP and the Islamic Gülen movement. On 25 April 2016, the Turkish Parliament Speaker İsmail Kahraman told a conference of Islamic scholars and writers in Istanbul that "secularism would not have a place in a new constitution", as Turkey is "a Muslim country and so we should have a religious constitution". (One of the duties of Parliament Speaker is to pen a new draft constitution for Turkey.) As of 2023, some sources define the party as being "rooted in political Islam" and an "Islamist-rooted party".

In recent years, the ideology of the party has shifted more towards Turkish nationalism, causing liberals such as Ali Babacan and some conservatives such as Ahmet Davutoğlu and Abdullah Gül to leave the party. Several writers have also labelled the party as being right-wing populist since 2007.

The party's foreign policy has also been widely described as Neo-Ottomanist, an ideology that promotes renewed Turkish political engagement in the former territories of its predecessor state, the Ottoman Empire. However, the party's leadership has also rejected this label. The party's relationship with the Muslim Brotherhood has drawn allegations of Islamism.

The AKP favors a strong centralized leadership, having long advocated for a presidential system of government and significantly reduced the number of elected local government positions in 2013.

The party was an observer in the centre-right European People's Party between 2005 and 2013 and a member of the Soft Euroscepticism Alliance of Conservatives and Reformists in Europe (ACRE) from 2013 to 2018.

In 2021, Erdoğan withdrew Turkey from the Council of Europe's Istanbul Convention on violence against women and has attacked groups that defend women. The party initially opposed Finland's and Sweden's applications to join NATO, but later agreed to support their bids. In May 2023, Erdoğan said at a rally in Istanbul, "AKP and other parties in our alliance would never be pro-LGBT, because family is sacred to us. We will bury those pro-LGBT in the ballot box".

=== European affiliation ===
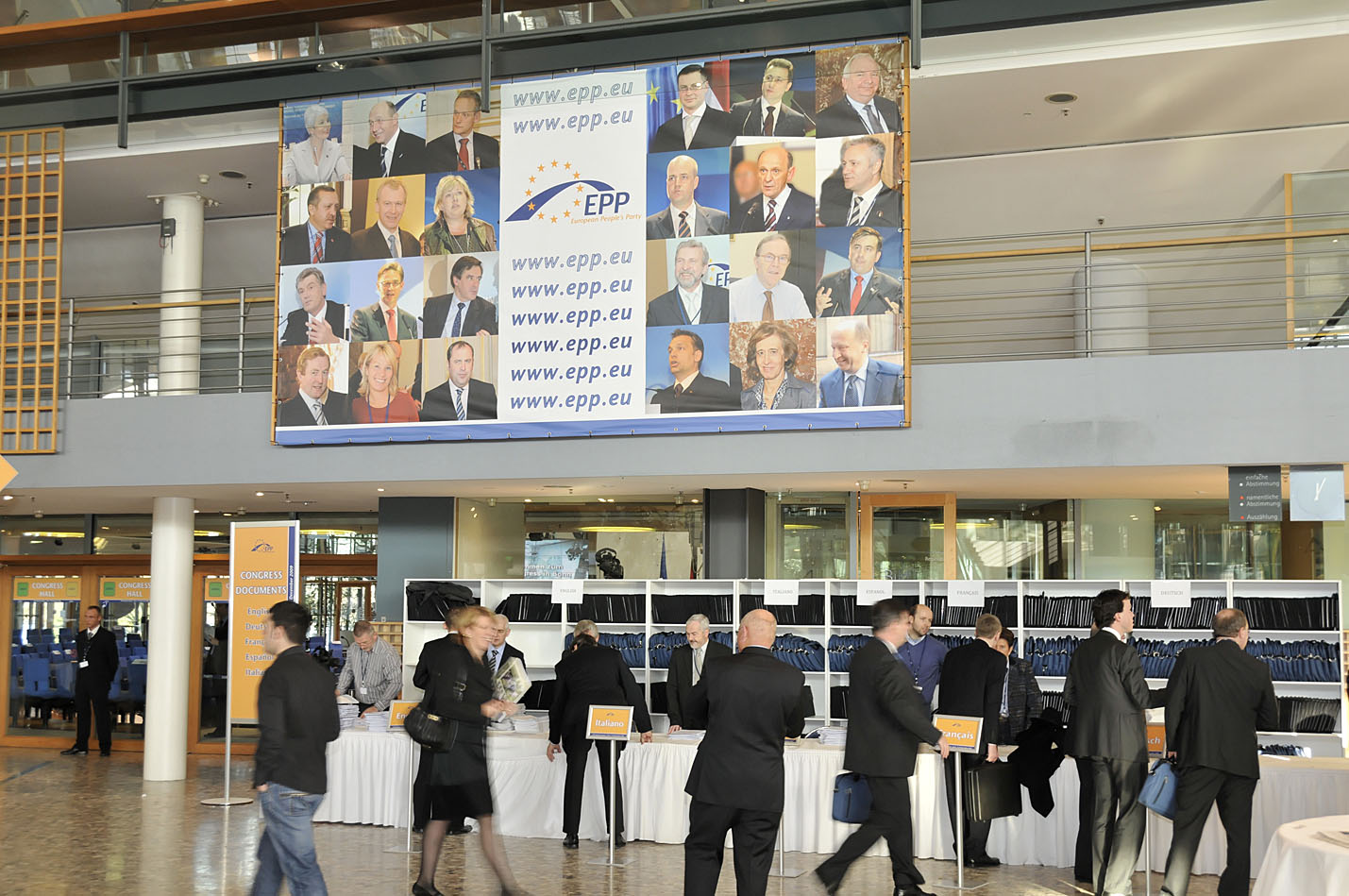
Picture of Erdogan among other leaders at the European People's Party Congress in 2009

In 2005, the party was granted observer membership in the European People's Party (EPP).

In November 2013, the party left the EPP to join the Alliance of European Conservatives and Reformists (now European Conservatives and Reformists Party) instead. This move was attributed to the AKP's disappointment not to be granted full membership in the EPP, while it was admitted as a full member of the AECR. It drew criticism in both national and European discourses, as the driving force of Turkey's aspirations to become a member of the European Union decided to join a largely Soft Euroscepticism alliance, abandoning the more influential pro-European EPP, feeding suspicions that AKP wants to join a watered down, not a closely integrated EU. The AKP withdrew from AECR in 2018. The AKP has been seen to be soft Eurosceptic.

=== Legislation and positions ===
From 2002 to 2011 the party passed series of reforms to increase accessibility to healthcare and housing, distribute food subsidies, increased funding for students, improved infrastructure in poorer districts, and improved rights for religious and ethnic minorities. AKP is also widely accredited for overcoming the 2001 Turkish economic crisis by following International Monetary Fund guidelines, as well as successfully weathering the 2008 financial crisis. From 2002 to 2011, the Turkish economy grew on average by 7.5 percent annually, thanks to lower inflation and interest rates. The government under AKP also backed extensive privatization programs. In fact, 88% of the privatizations in Turkey were carried out under AKP rule. The average income in Turkey rose from $2,800 U.S. in 2001 to around $10,000 U.S. in 2011, higher than income in some of the new EU member states. Other reforms included increasing civilian representation over military in areas of national security, education and media, and grant broadcasting and increased cultural rights to Kurds. On Cyprus, AKP supported unification of Cyprus, something deeply opposed by the Turkish military. Other AKP reforms included lifting bans on religious and conservative dress, such as headscarves, in universities and public institutions. AKP also ended discrimination against students from religious high schools, who previously had to meet additional criteria in areas of education and upon entry to universities. AKP is also accredited for bringing the Turkish military under civilian rule, a paradigm shift for a country that had experienced constant military meddling for almost a century.

More recently, nationwide protests broke out against the alleged authoritarianism of the AKP in 2013, with the party's perceived heavy-handed response receiving western condemnation and stalling the party's once championed EU accession negotiations. In addition to its alleged attempts to promote Islamism, the party is accused by some of restricting some civil liberties and internet use in Turkey, having temporarily blocked access to Twitter and YouTube in March 2014. Especially after the government corruption scandal involving several AKP ministers in 2013, the party has been increasingly accused of crony capitalism. The AKP favors a strong centralized leadership, having long advocated for a presidential system of government and significantly reduced the number of elected local government positions in 2013.

== Criticism ==
Critics have accused the AKP of having a 'hidden agenda' despite their public endorsement of secularism and the party maintains informal relations and support for the Muslim Brotherhood. Both the party's domestic and foreign policy has been perceived to be Pan-Islamist or Neo-Ottoman, advocating a revival of Ottoman culture often at the expense of secular republican principles, while increasing regional presence in former Ottoman territories.

The AKP has been criticized for supporting a large-scale purge of thousands of academics after the failed coup attempt in 2016. On the first day of school after the failed coup d’état, primary, lower-secondary, and secondary-school students were forced to watch videos about the “triumph of democracy” over the plotters and listen to speeches equating the civilian counter-coup that thwarted the takeover with historic Ottoman victories dating back 1,000 years. Campaigns have been organized to secure the release of higher-education personnel and to have the charges against them dropped for peacefully exercising their academic freedom.

Imprisonment of political activists continues, while the chair of Amnesty Turkey has been jailed for standing up to the AKP on trumped up "terrorism charges". These charges have drawn condemnation from many western countries, including from the US State Department, the EU, as well as from international and domestic human rights organisations.

The party has also been criticized by Turkish and international LGBT rights groups including KAOS GL for homophobic statements made by some AKP politicians and for what they argue has become a repressive climate for LGBT rights in Turkey under the AKP. In 2002 before his election, Erdoğan said that "homosexuals must be legally protected within the framework of their rights and freedoms." In 2011, AKP Minister for Families and Social Policy Fatma Şahin said the AKP government would be willing to work with LGBT rights groups to advance laws protecting Turkey's gay community. However, commentators have argued the AKP has taken an increasingly hardline stance on LGBT issues since coming to power, which has been characterized variously as part of a general trend towards authoritarianism under the AKP or as motivated by Islamic and militant nationalist sentiments within the party. In 2012, the AKP voted against a proposal by the BDP to include legalization of same-sex marriage in the redrafted Turkish constitution and in 2013 blocked a research motion in the parliament of Turkey on having a parliamentary debate regarding LGBT rights. During the latter debate, AKP MP Türkan Dağoğlu stated "Homosexuality is an abnormality. Same-sex marriages may not be allowed. It would cause social deterioration"; this prompted criticism from some opposition politicians. In 2017, Erdogan stated that the principle of LGBT rights was "against the values of our nation" and in 2020 endorsed controversial anti-gay statements made by Muslim scholar Ali Erbaş which had received condemnation from some Turkish lawyers and human rights groups. In 2021, AKP vice chairman and Interior Minister Suleyman Soylu declared LGBT people to be "perverts." Turkish constitutional law experts Sule Ozsoy Boyunsuz and Serkan Koybasi have described public statements on gay people made by AKP politicians as both constituting as hate speech and contradicting the principle of Turkey's policy of secularism. Political scientist Mine Eder has argued that Turkey has experienced a backslide on acceptance and government anti-discrimination support for homosexuals under Erdogan.

=== 2013 corruption scandal ===
The 2013 corruption scandal was a criminal investigation that involved several key people in the Turkish government. All of the 52 people detained on 17 December were connected in various ways with the ruling Justice and Development Party. Prosecutors accused 14 people – including Suleyman Aslan, the director of state-owned Halkbank, Iranian businessman Reza Zarrab, and several family members of cabinet ministers – of bribery, corruption, fraud, money laundering and gold smuggling.

At the heart of the scandal was an alleged "gas for gold" scheme with Iran involving Aslan, who had US$4.5 million in cash stored in shoeboxes in his home, and Zarrab, who was involved in about US$9.6 billion of gold trading in 2012. Both men were arrested. The scheme started after Turkish government officials found a loophole in the U.S. sanctions against Iran that allowed them to access Iranian oil and gas. The Turks exported some US$13 billion of gold to Iran directly, or through the UAE, between March 2012 and July 2013. In return, the Turks received Iranian natural gas and oil. The transactions were carried out through the Turkish state-owned bank, Halkbank. In January 2013, the Obama administration decided to close this loophole but instead of immediately charging Halkbank, the U.S. government allowed its gold trading activities to continue until July 2013, because Turkey was an important ally regarding the American-led intervention in the Syrian Civil War, and the U.S. had been working on a nuclear deal with Iran.

Then-Prime Minister Erdogan (now President of Turkey) was on a tour of Pakistan when the scandal broke, which analysts believe changed the response of the AKP, or influenced those with the tapes to leak them at a time when Erdoğan was visiting an ally (Pakistan).

=== 2025 Protests ===
Main articles: Arrest of Ekrem İmamoğlu and 2025 Turkish protests

Widespread protests began throughout Turkey on 19 March 2025 following the detention and arrest of Istanbul mayor Ekrem İmamoğlu and more than 100 other opposition members and protesters by Turkish authorities. The gatherings represented significant public opposition to what participants characterized as politically motivated legal actions against İmamoğlu, who was the primary opposition candidate for the 2028 Turkish presidential election and incumbent Turkish president Recep Tayyip Erdoğan's main political rival. The protests have been characterized as the nation's largest since the so-called Gezi Park protests in 2013.

== Party leaders ==
No.	Portrait	Leader (birth–death)	Constituency	Took office	Left office	Term length	Leadership elections
1	Recep Tayyip Erdoğan	Recep Tayyip Erdoğan (born 1954)	Siirt (2003); İstanbul (I) (2007, 2011)	14 August 2001	27 August 2014	13 years, 13 days	2003 Ordinary Congress; 2006 Ordinary Congress; 2009 Ordinary Congress; 2012 Ordinary Congress
2	Ahmet Davutoğlu	Ahmet Davutoğlu (born 1959)	Konya	27 August 2014	22 May 2016	1 year, 269 days	2014 Extraordinary Congress; 2015 Ordinary Congress
3	Binali Yıldırım	Binali Yıldırım (born 1955)	İstanbul (I) (2002); Erzincan (2007); İzmir (II) (2011); İzmir (I) (Nov 2015, 2018)	22 May 2016	21 May 2017	364 days	2016 Extraordinary Congress
(1)	Recep Tayyip Erdoğan	Recep Tayyip Erdoğan (born 1954)	Incumbent President	21 May 2017	Incumbent	9 years, 184 days	2017 Extraordinary Congress; 2018 Ordinary Congress; 2021 Ordinary Congress; 2025 Ordinary Congress

== Election results ==
=== Presidential elections ===
Presidential election record of the Justice and Development Party (AKP)
Election	Candidate	First round		Second round		Outcome	Map
Election	Candidate	Votes	%	Votes	%	Outcome	Map
10 August 2014	Recep Tayyip Erdoğan	21,000,143	51.79%	—N/a	—N/a	1st	
24 June 2018	Recep Tayyip Erdoğan	26,330,823	52.59%	—N/a	—N/a	1st	
14 May 2023	Recep Tayyip Erdoğan	27,133,849	49.52%	27,834,589	52.18%	1st	

=== General elections ===
General election record of the Justice and Development Party (AKP) 0–10% 10–20% 20–30% 30–40% 40–50% 50–60% 60–70% 70–80%
Election	Leader	Vote	Seats	Result	Position	Map
3 November 2002	Recep Tayyip Erdoğan	10,808,229	363 / 550 (▲363)	34.28% ▲34.28 pp	Majority government	
22 July 2007	Recep Tayyip Erdoğan	16,327,291	341 / 550 (▼22)	46.58% ▲12.30 pp	Majority government	
12 June 2011	Recep Tayyip Erdoğan	21,399,082	327 / 550 (▼14)	49.83% ▲3.25 pp	Majority government	
7 June 2015	Ahmet Davutoğlu	18,867,411	258 / 550 (▼69)	40.87% ▼8.96 pp	Coalition government	
1 November 2015	Ahmet Davutoğlu	23,681,926	317 / 550 (▲59)	49.50% ▲8.63 pp	Majority government	
24 June 2018	Recep Tayyip Erdoğan	21,338,693	295 / 600 (▼21)	42.56% ▼6.94 pp	Government (Note: Minority in the legislature. Due to the presidential system, the president does not need a majority to form a government.)	
14 May 2023	Recep Tayyip Erdoğan	19,392,462	268 / 600 (▼27)	35.62% ▼6.94 pp	Government	

==== By-elections ====
Election	Candidates	Votes	%	Seats	Map
9 March 2003	Recep Tayyip Erdoğan (1st); Öner Gülyeşil (2nd); Öner Ergenç (3rd)	55,203	84.82%	3 / 3	

=== Local elections ===
Local election record of the Justice and Development Party (AKP)
Election	Leader	Metropolitan		District		Municipal		Provincial		Map
Election	Leader	Vote	Mayors	Vote	Mayors	Vote	Councillors	Vote	Councillors	
28 March 2004	Recep Tayyip Erdoğan	46.07% 4,822,636	12 / 16	40.19% 9,674,306	1,750 / 3,193	40.33% 9,635,145	16,637 / 34,477	41.67% 13,447,287	2,276 / 3,208	
29 March 2009	Recep Tayyip Erdoğan	42.19% 7,672,280	10 / 16	38.64% 12,449,187	1,442 / 2,903	38.16% 12,237,325	14,732 / 32,393	38.39% 15,353,553	1,889 / 3,281	
30 March 2014	Recep Tayyip Erdoğan	45.54% 15,898,025	18 / 30	43.13% 17,952,504	800 / 1,351	42.87% 17,802,976	10,530 / 20,500	45.43% 4,622,484	779 / 1,251	
31 March 2019	Recep Tayyip Erdoğan	44.29% 16,000,992	15 / 30	42.55% 18,368,421	762 / 1,351	42.56% 18,299,576	10,175 / 20,500	41.61% 4,371,692	757 / 1,251	
31 March 2024	Recep Tayyip Erdoğan	36.44% 13,037,120	12 / 30	33.05% 14,224,559	526 / 1,356	32.38% 13,874,511	8,174 / 20,953	32.16% 3,304,092	592 / 1,282	

==== Re-runs ====
Election	Candidate	Votes	%	Outcome	Map
23 June 2019	Binali Yıldırım	3,936,068	45.00%	2nd	

=== Referendums ===
Election date	Party leader	Yes vote	Percentage	No vote	Percentage	AKP's support
21 October 2007	Recep Tayyip Erdoğan	19,422,714	68.95	8,744,947	31.05	Yes
12 September 2010	Recep Tayyip Erdoğan	21,789,180	57.88	15,854,113	42.12	Yes
16 April 2017	Binali Yıldırım	25,157,025	51.41	23,777,091	48.59	Yes

== See also ==
- Erdoğanism
- Grand National Assembly of Turkey
- List of political parties in Turkey
- Politics of Turkey
- Conservatism in Turkey
- Parliamentary terms of Turkey
