= 2011 Turkish Riviera mass alcohol poisoning =

The 2011 Turkish Riviera mass alcohol poisoning was an event that occurred on May 26–27, 2011, during a party on a yacht voyage of mostly female Russian tourists on the way from Bodrum to Antalya, southwestern Turkey. It led to the deaths of five people, and the hospitalisation of twenty others, some in critical condition, after consuming alcoholic drinks mixed with methanol, served at the yacht's bar. A consignment of fake whisky had been supplied by a distributor with a fictitious address.

== Incident ==
The Russian women were employed as managers and tour guides with Russian travel agencies, and came to Bodrum in the western Turkish Riviera for a promotion trip organized by Russian tourist company Mostravel.

Together with Russian employees of local Turkish travel companies, the women took a yacht voyage along the coast of Turkish Riviera in southwestern Turkey, a popular tour known locally as "Blue Cruise" (Turkish: Mavi Yolculuk). The yacht Orhan-5 was chartered for this purpose, and sailed from May 26–27, 2011, with some 60 Russian tourists aboard.

The mass poisoning occurred during a party on the night of May 27 aboard the yacht. Twenty passengers had alcohol poisoning after consuming drinks served from the yacht's bar. The Russian women enjoyed drinking whiskey with cola. Anastasia Lavrenko, one of the young women aboard, told a Russian newspaper that they all had 10-12 glasses of cocktails. She added that even though she felt the alcohol tasted unusually strong, she did not realise anything.

Arriving in Antalya the next morning, the tourists went to their hotel to rest for the next day's flight back home. Many of them experienced motion sickness, vomiting and loss of consciousness. The affected persons were hospitalised and diagnosed with alcohol poisoning.

== Deaths ==
Some twenty Russian citizens and a Turkish man were affected by alcohol poisoning. Three women died, others were hospitalized in Antalya and Denizli, with six placed in intensive care stations in critical condition.

On May 30, Marina Sheveleva (Russian: Марина Шевелева), born in 1989, was the first death at a hospital in her country, after her condition worsened during the flight to Moscow.

Two other Russian citizens, Maria Shalyapina (Russian: Мария Шаляпина), born in 1983, and Aigul Zalayeva (Russian: Айгуль Залаева), born in 1991, died in the following days at the hospital of Akdeniz University in Antalya.

On the night of June 5, 2011, 28-year-old Alexandr Zhuchkov (Russian: Алекса́ндр Жучков) died in the hospital of Pamukkale University in Denizli, where he had been in intense supportive care since May 28. He became the fourth Russian death. His body was transferred to Russia by the Russian Consulate.

Twenty-two-year-old Viktoria Nikolaeva (Russian: Виктория Николаева), who was being treated in the intensive station of Akdeniz University's hospital in Antalya, died due to brain damage in the evening hours of June 20, 2011. The fifth person died in the early morning hours of July 4, 2011.

== Investigation ==
Turkish police immediately launched an investigation into the mass poisoning. Samples of alcohol were taken from the yacht for analysis. The Investigation Committee of the Russian Federation also opened an investigation. It is believed that the whiskey served contained methanol, making the drink toxic.

The Turkish Minister of Agriculture, who is also responsible for carrying out food safety control in the country, stated that the alcoholic beverage served on the yacht was supplied by the company "Jasmine", based in Northern Cyprus, and was imported by the company "Birlik Gıda" in Ankara. About 12,000 bottles of fake whiskey labeled "Mister Burdon" were distributed in the provinces of Ankara, Mersin, Antalya and Muğla. Turkish police found out that the address of Birlik Gıda was fictitious. The ministry stated that the methyl alcohol in the whiskey consumed was three times higher than normal. Police made 22 arrests and seized thousands of bottles of bootleg liquor.
