= 1st Justice and Development Party Extraordinary Congress =

Party election in Turkey

2014 Justice and Development Party leadership election
- 27 August 2014
- Turnout: 97.7%
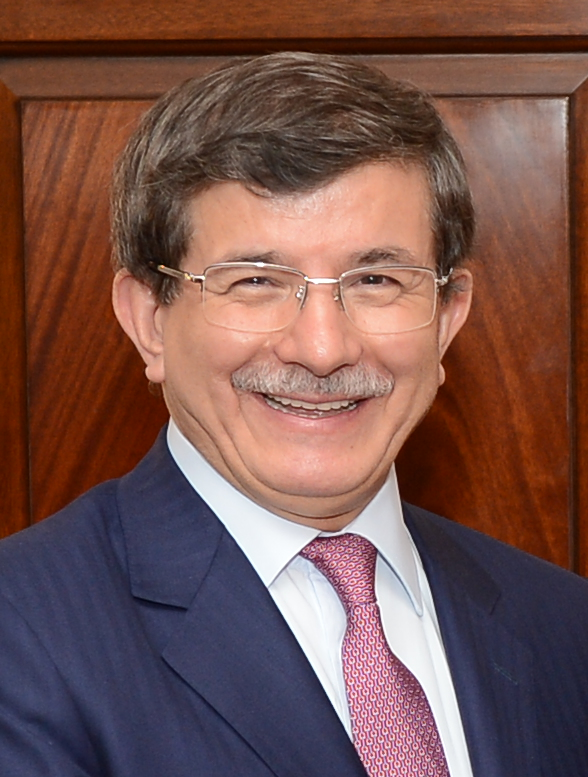
Candidate	Ahmet Davutoğlu
Party	AK Party
Constituency	Konya
Popular vote	1,382
Percentage	100%
Leader before election
Recep Tayyip Erdoğan
AK Party
Elected Leader
Ahmet Davutoğlu
AK Party

The 2014 Extraordinary Congress of the Justice and Development Party (Turkish: Adalet ve Kalkınma Partisi Olağanüstü Kongresi) was held on 27 August 2014 in order to elect a new leader of the Justice and Development Party (often abbreviated AK Party or AKP), the ruling political party of Turkey. It was the first extraordinary congress in the party's history, necessitated by the election of party leader Recep Tayyip Erdoğan as the 12th president of Turkey. Former Foreign Minister and Konya MP Ahmet Davutoğlu was unanimously elected unopposed as party leader. The congress marked the last public appearance of Recep Tayyip Erdoğan as prime minister, as he assumed the Presidency the day after. The congress took place at a time of significant change to Turkish politics, with the opposition Republican People's Party also holding an extraordinary convention on 5–6 September.

== Background ==
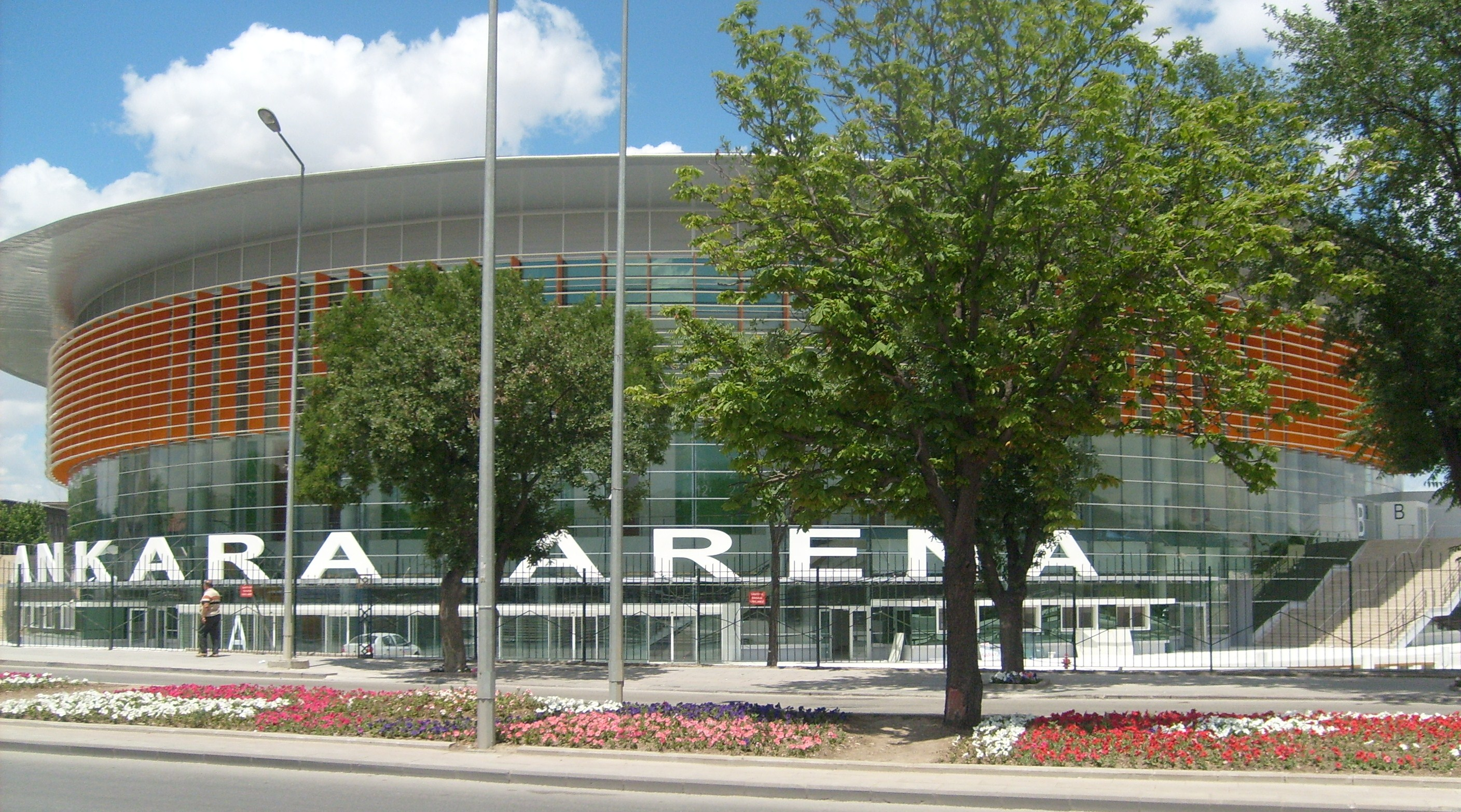
The Ankara Arena, venue for the 2014 AKP extraordinary congress

The AKP had initially made preparations for their first ever extraordinary congress before the presidential election on August 10, on the correct assumption that their party leader and presidential candidate Recep Tayyip Erdoğan would win. On 21 August, the AKP's Central Executive Board put forward Foreign Minister Ahmet Davutoğlu as a candidate for the leadership of the party, since Erdoğan must sever all relations with the AKP by the time he takes over as president on 28 August 2014. The decision by the AKP Central Executive Committee (MYK) to nominate Davutoğlu for the leadership was taken in a three-hour meeting chaired by Erdoğan. The election of Davutoğlu, a key Erdoğan loyalist, as party leader and Prime Minister has been viewed as a means by which Recep Tayyip Erdoğan will remain in indirect command of the government as well as the Presidency.

== Event ==
The congress took place in at the Ankara Arena. Two large screens relaying live footage of the congress, as well as pictures of Erdoğan and Davutoğlu, were placed outside the stadium for AK supporters. The lack of air conditioning caused notable discomfort, especially to Recep Tayyip Erdoğan and Ahmet Davutoğlu. Around 900 journalists, of which 100 were from international news agencies, as well as several foreign guests also attended the event.

=== Agenda ===
The agenda for the congress was as follows:

1. Opening and roll call
2. Election of the Council president
3. Independence March performance
4. Recital of the agenda
5. Party leader's speech
6. Leadership candidates to apply to the Council President
7. Leadership candidates' speeches
8. Wishes and vestments
9. Leadership election (congress would re-convene on 28 August should a simple majority not be reached)
10. Leader's thank-you speech
11. Closure

AKP deputy leader Süleyman Soylu announced that 1,245 delegates had initially arrived and had all nominated Davutoğlu for the leadership, which was enough for a leadership election to take place. A video of Recep Tayyip Erdoğan's history was played.

=== Erdoğan's speech ===
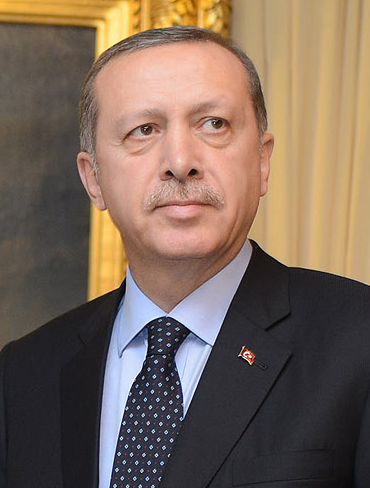
Recep Tayyip Erdoğan, leader of the Justice and Development Party from 2001 to 2014

In his speech lasting 110 minutes, Erdoğan vowed to keep fighting the "parallel state" which he claimed is formed by bureaucrats and judicial officials from Cemaat aligned with Fethullah Gülen. He claimed that the change of leadership would only be cosmetic, with the party's principles and missions remaining the same. He further stated that the nomination of Davutoğlu as leader was not for show or as a "trustee". Claiming that the AKP's "road to a new Turkey" was in the vision of both Mustafa Kemal Atatürk and Adnan Menderes, Erdoğan stated that his absence would by no means result in the party's downfall or loss of political vision. In his closing remarks, he criticised the opposition Republican People's Party (CHP) for its refusal to not attend his swearing in as a democratically elected president, the Nationalist Movement Party (MHP) for its opposition to the PKK peace process and the Peoples' Democratic Party (HDP) for supporting terrorism. Claiming that supporters of such opposition parties had also supported his presidential election bid, Erdoğan thanked his voters and hoped that the opposition would learn from their electoral losses.

=== Davutoğlu's speech ===
Davutoğlu's speech contained harsh criticism for the 2013-14 anti government protests as well as the 2013 corruption scandal, claiming that their main aim was to damage the confidence that the AKP had given the people of Turkey while in government. Arguing that the AKP has a dream for a new Turkey, he claimed that anyone who did not see such a dream should be embarrassed. He also promised to not marginalise or polarise the electorate, and vowed to safeguard the union of the nation. He stated that Erdoğan's election as President as well as the formation of a new government will mark the start of the road to a new Turkey.

=== Party Council election ===
The elected leaders of the party council (divan) are as follows:

- Haluk İpek – AKP general secretary and Ankara MP, elected as Council President
- Berna Satır – Istanbul MP and parliamentary group leader, elected as Council Vice President

The elected council members are as follows:

- Mehmet Doğan Kubat – Istanbul MP
- Gönül Bekin Şahkulubey – Mardin MP
- Güldal Akşit – President of the AKP Women's Wing
- Zafer Çubukcu – President of the AKP Youth Wing
- Aziz Babuşcu – leader of the AKP Istanbul branch

=== Leadership election ===
Ahmet Davutoğlu was the only registered candidate for election. A total of 1,388 delegates voted with 15 ballot boxes.

Candidate	Votes	Percentage
Ahmet Davutoğlu	1,382	100.0
Invalid/blank votes	6	–
Total	1,388	100.0
Number of delegates/turnout	1,420	97.7
Source: Akşam
